= 2020–21 Coupe de France preliminary rounds, Bourgogne-Franche-Comté =

The 2020–21 Coupe de France preliminary rounds, Bourgogne-Franche-Comté was the qualifying competition to decide which teams from the leagues of the Bourgogne-Franche-Comté region of France took part in the main competition from the seventh round.

A total of seven teams qualified from the Bourgogne-Franche-Comté Preliminary rounds. In 2019–20, ASM Belfort progressed furthest in the main competition, reaching the quarter-finals before losing to Rennes 0–3.

== Schedule ==
A total of 397 teams entered from the region. The draw therefore required a Preliminary round involving six clubs, before the first round, where the remaining 373 clubs from District and Regional leagues entered. The draw for the preliminary and first rounds was made on 13 July 2020.

The third round draw, which saw the entry of the teams from Championnat National 3, was made on 8 September 2020. The fourth round draw, which saw the entry of the teams from Championnat National 2, was made on 22 September 2020. The fifth round draw was made on 6 October 2020. The sixth round draw was made on 20 October 2020.

=== Preliminary round ===
These matches were played on 21 and 22 August 2020.

Preliminary round results: Bourgogne-Franche-Comté
Tie no	Home team (tier)	Score	Away team (tier)
1.	ES Branges (10)	1–2	FC La Roche-Vineuse (9)
2.	Drugeon Sports (11)	0–7	ES Saugette Entre-Roches (9)
3.	FREP Luthenay (10)	0–0 (3–4 p)	CS Corbigeois (9)

=== First round ===
These matches were played on 29 and 30 August 2020, with one replayed 13 September 2020.

First round results: Bourgogne-Franche-Comté
Tie no	Home team (tier)	Score	Away team (tier)
1.	SCM Valdoie (9)	2–4	FC Noidanais (7)
2.	ES Exincourt-Taillecourt (9)	1–3	AS Audincourt (6)
3.	AS Danjoutin-Andelnans-Méroux (8)	2–0	AS Nord Territoire (9)
4.	US Pusey (10)	1–5	ASL Autechaux-Roide (9)
5.	US Les Fontenelles (10)	1–2	AS Avoudrey (10)
6.	FC Villars-sous-Écot/Saint-Maurice/Blussans (10)	2–2 (3–5 p)	JS Lure (7)
7.	AS Présentevillers-Sainte-Marie (10)	0–1	Bessoncourt Roppe Club Larivière (7)
8.	FC Suarce (12)	1–12	US Les Écorces (7)
9.	FC L'Isle-sur-le-Doubs (8)	1–4	FC Vesoul (6)
10.	Vallée du Breuchin FC (10)	0–5	US Sochaux (7)
11.	AS Valentigney (11)	9–2	AS Offemont (11)
12.	AS Feule-Solemont (11)	0–7	FC Bart (7)
13.	FC Le Russey (11)	0–0 (4–5 p)	GLS Club 90 (11)
14.	FC Bourogne (12)	0–0 (4–2 p)	FC Pays Minier (10)
15.	FAC Lougres (11)	0–4	AS Orchamps-Val de Vennes (8)
16.	Olympique Courcelles-lès-Montbéliard (9)	0–4	US Pont-de-Roide (6)
17.	AS Sainte Suzanne (11)	0–4	ASFC Belfort (9)
18.	RC Voujeaucourt (10)	3–1	FC Pays de Luxeuil (11)
19.	UOP Mathay (12)	0–3 (Note: Tie won by means of forfeit.)	ES Pays Maîchois (8)
20.	USC Sermamagny (10)	0–8	AS Mélisey-Saint Barthélemy (8)
21.	SR Villars-sous-Dampjoux (11)	1–4	Longevelle SC (9)
22.	AS Méziré-Fesches-le-Châtel (8)	2–1	Haute-Lizaine Pays d'Héricourt (7)
23.	AS Courtefontaine-Les Plains (10)	0–2	US Sous-Roches (8)
24.	ES Trévillers-Thiébouhans (11)	5–6	FC Colombe (9)
25.	FC Seloncourt (10)	4–3	AS Essert (10)
26.	AS Rougegoutte (10)	1–3	AS Bavilliers (7)
27.	FC Giro-Lepuix (8)	5–1	AS Hérimoncourt (9)
28.	ASC Vesoul Nord (12)	0–6	US Franchevelle (9)
29.	FC Plaimbois-du-Miroir (10)	2–2 (3–4 p)	US Bavans (10)
30.	AS Guyans-Vennes (9)	4–0	AS Pierrefontaine et Laviron (10)
31.	CS Beaucourt (9)	1–14	AS Belfort Sud (6)
32.	US Les Fins (11)	0–1	Rougemont Concorde (9)
33.	US Châtenois-les-Forges (7)	1–1 (4–3 p)	US Larians-et-Munans (7)
34.	US Saint Hippolyte (12)	1–3	FC Forges Audincourt (10)
35.	SR Delle (8)	6–1	AS Fougerolles (9)
36.	US Arcey (10)	0–1	SC Saint Loup-Corbenay-Magnoncourt (8)
37.	ASC Montbéliard (10)	0–2	SG Héricourt (8)
38.	ES Les Fonges 91 (9)	3–0	FC Lac-Remoray-Vaux (10)
39.	US Les Quatre Monts (11)	3–1	US Laveron (11)
40.	US Foncine (11)	0–14	FC Champagnole (6)
41.	AS Ornans (6)	2–2 (2–3 p)	FCC La Joux (7)
42.	FC Massif Haut Doubs (11)	1–3	Travailleurs Turcs Pontarlier (9)
43.	ES Sirod (9)	0–2	Arcade Foot (8)
44.	ES Saugette Entre-Roches (9)	1–1 (5–4 p)	SC Villers-le-Lac (8)
45.	RC Chaux-du-Dombief (10)	1–1 (2–4 p)	FC Haut Jura (8)
46.	AS Château de Joux (9)	7–0	Entente Le Châteleu (10)
47.	Étoile Saugette La Chaux de Gilley (10)	1–2	ES Doubs (8)
48.	FC Liévremont-Arçon (9)	1–2	CS Frasne (9)
49.	AS Fort-du-Plasne (10)	0–4	AS Levier (6)
50.	US Crotenay Combe d'Ain (10)	2–2 (4–5 p)	ES Dannemarie (9)
51.	ASC Amathay-Longeville (12)	0–3	AS Mont d'Usiers (10)
52.	Amancey-Bolandoz-Chantrans Foot (10)	0–1	AS Baume-les-Dames (6)
53.	FC Mouchard-Arc-et-Senans (10)	1–3	Poligny-Grimont FC (7)
54.	FC Aiserey-Izeure (9)	0–3	Dijon ULFE (10)
55.	FC Jeunesse Mahoraise (11)	5–1 (Note: FC Jeunesse Mahoraise penalised for fielding ineligible players. FC Amagney Marchaux qualify.)	FC Amagney Marchaux (11)
56.	Jura Nord Foot (10)	0–0 (3–2 p)	FC Val de Loue (9)
57.	FC Brenne-Orain (10)	0–4	FC 4 Rivières 70 (6)
58.	ASFC Daix (10)	1–2	CS Auxonnais (8)
59.	CLL Échenon (10)	1–2 (Note: SC Clémenceau Besançon penalised for fielding an ineligible players. CLL Échenon qualify.)	SC Clémenceau Besançon (11)
60.	AS Saint Usage Saint-Jean-de-Losne (8)	4–1	FC Saulon-Corcelles (9)
61.	FC Émagny Pin (11)	1–1 (2–4 p)	FC Vingeanne (9)
62.	US Chanitoise (10)	2–1	AEP Pouilley-les-Vignes (7)
63.	FC Remilly (11)	0–2	AS Foucherans (9)
64.	Dinamo Dijon (11)	0–5	CCS Val d'Amour Mont-sous-Vaudrey (7)
65.	FC Grésilles (10)	5–0	FC Premier Plateau (9)
66.	FR Rahon (11)	3–0	FC Aigremont Montoille (12)
67.	AS Moissey (11)	0–4	FC Mirebellois-Pontailler-Lamarche (8)
68.	FEP Autrey-lès-Gray (11)	0–4	FC Montfaucon-Morre-Gennes-La Vèze (7)
69.	US Fontain (10)	0–5	ASD des DOM (11)
70.	FC La Gourgeonne (10)	0–4	EF Villages (8)
71.	US Brazey-en-Plaine (11)	0–6	ES Fauverney-Rouvres-Bretenière (7)
72.	FC Ouges-Fénay (9)	2–0	FC Rochefort-Amange (8)
73.	SC Jussey (9)	1–2	RC Saônois (9)
74.	ESJA Myon-Chay Intercommunal (11)	1–6	US Saint-Vit (6)
75.	FC Magny-sur-Tille (12)	3–4	FC Les 2 Vels (10)
76.	ISS Pleure (10)	3–2	US Rioz-Étuz-Cussey (7)
77.	US Avanne-Aveney (10)	3–4	ASC Velotte (10)
78.	FC Ahuy (11)	1–2	AS Plateau de La Barêche (11)
79.	FC Grand Besançon (8)	1–6	Fontaine-lès-Dijon FC (7)
80.	AS Genlis (8)	2–3 (Note: Tie reversed since original draw.)	Spartak Bressey (10)
81.	AS Beure (10)	0–4	AS Perrouse (7)
82.	AS Montbarrey (11)	0–3	Entente Roche-Novillars (6)
83.	Thise-Chalezeule FC (10)	3–1	AS Sâone-Mamirolle (9)
84.	ALC Longvic (8)	3–0	AS Dijon Toison d'Or (12)
85.	FC Aiglepierre (9)	2–3	ES Marnaysienne (9)
86.	US Grandmont (11)	2–0	US Marey-Cussey (11)
87.	Val de Norge FC (10)	1–4	US Cheminots Dijonnais (7)
88.	Tilles FC (9)	1–0	FC Plaine 39 (10)
89.	AS Poussots (11)	2–5	Espérance Arc-Gray (8)
90.	FC Neuilly-Crimolois Sennecey (10)	1–5	Jura Stad' FC (8)
91.	FC Aignay Baigneux (11)	0–0 (3–5 p)	US Doubs Sud (10)
92.	PS Dole-Crissey (9)	1–0	Triangle d'Or Jura Foot (7)
93.	AC Bouquet Soucy/Thorigny (12)	0–1	ES Héry (9)
94.	Saint-Fargeau SF (10)	0–3	Avallon FCO (6)
95.	FC Saint Rémy les Montbard (9)	3–2	Union Châtillonniase Colombine (7)
96.	SC Malay-le-Grand (11)	1–1 (3–4 p)	La Vaillante Prémery (9)
97.	AS Saint-Bris-le-Vineux (9)	0–2	AS Clamecy (7)
98.	ASC Pougues (9)	4–1	Cosnois FC (11)
99.	AS Pouilly-sur-Loire (11)	6–0	ES Charbuy (11)
100.	JS Saint-Révérien (11)	0–6	US Varennes (9)
101.	Jeunesse Sénonaise (10)	2–2 (5–6 p)	Entente Châtel-Gérard Nucerien (9)
102.	AS Varzy (11)	0–6	Stade Auxerrois (6)
103.	AJ Sautourienne (10)	2–0	Aillant SF (10)
104.	AS Gurgy (9)	1–1 (3–4 p)	RC Entrains (10)
105.	Amicale Franco-Portugais Sens (9)	0–1	AS Magny (7)
106.	US Joigny (10)	1–4	FC Sens (6)
107.	FC Gatinais en Bourgogne (10)	4–2	Auxerre Sports Citoyens (11)
108.	UF Tonnerrois (10)	0–1	SC Gron Véron (10)
109.	Montbard Venarey (9)	1–3	US Dionysienne (10)
110.	ES Val d'Ource (10)	4–0	AS Chablis (8)
111.	ESIV Saint-Sérotin (12)	1–7	US Semur-Époisses (9)
112.	FC Persévérante Pontoise (11)	0–5	CA Saint-Georges (8)
113.	ASUC Migennes (8)	2–0	US Toucycoise (9)
114.	AS Précy (12)	0–8	ES Appoigny (7)
115.	FC Champs-sur-Yonne (9)	1–8	Union Cosnoise Sportive (6)
116.	Monéteau FC (9)	1–2	US Cerisiers (8)
117.	ES Saint-Germain-du-Plaine-Baudrières (10)	1–2	Entente Sud Revermont (8)
118.	GC Beaufort (10)	2–6	Jura Lacs Foot (6)
119.	FC Macornay Val de Sorne (10)	1–2	Olympique Montmorot (9)
120.	US Lessard-en-Bresse (9)	0–3	AS Sagy (7)
121.	FC Courlaoux (12)	1–3	US Revermontaise (10)
122.	FC Charette (10)	1–3	FC Épervans (10)
123.	RC Bresse Sud (8)	1–1 (0–2 p)	US Coteaux de Seille (8)
124.	IS Saint-Usuge (10)	2–2 (1–4 p)	FR Saint-Maur (10)
125.	AS Aromas (11)	7–2	AS Arinthod (11)
126.	JS Simard (11)	1–1 (3–0 p)	US Les Bleuets Beaurepaire (11)
127.	AS Vaux-lès-Saint-Claude (9)	0–4	Bresse Jura Foot (7)
128.	AFC Cuiseaux-Champagnat (10)	0–8	RC Lons-le-Saunier (6)
129.	AS Tournus (12)	0–5	AS Saint-Julien-sur-Suran (10)
130.	AS Condal-Dommartin (11)	5–0	US San-Martinoise (11)
131.	IS Bresse Nord (10)	4–3 (Note: Match was abandoned with the scoreline 4–2. File was passed to the disciplinary committee, and is under investigation. Replayed 13 September.)	JS Abergement-Sainte-Colombe (10)
132.	ASPTT Grand Lons Jura (11)	1–1 (1–4 p)	CS Mervans (8)
133.	AS Sornay (8)	5–0	SC Châteaurenaud (9)
134.	ES Pays Charollais (10)	2–1	US Coulanges-lès-Nevers (9)
135.	AS Ciry-le-Noble (9)	0–3	AS Charrin (10)
136.	AS Chassy-Marly-Oudry (10)	0–4	US La Charité (6)
137.	AS Vendenesse-sur-Arroux (11)	2–4	Sud Foot 71 (8)
138.	ALSC Montigny-aux-Amognes (11)	2–4	FC Château-Chinon-Arleuf (10)
139.	Entente Antully Saint-Émiland Auxy (11)	2–5	Étoile Sud Nivernaise 58 (8)
140.	AS Saint-Agnan (10)	1–2	UF La Machine (8)
141.	Génelard Perrecy FC (9)	0–3	US Saint-Sernin-du-Bois (6)
142.	US Bourbon-Lancy FPT (10)	1–2	RC Nevers-Challuy Sermoise (8)
143.	FC Nevers Banlay (9)	9–0	CS Bazois (10)
144.	JF Palingeois (9)	2–2 (4–5 p)	US Saint-Pierre Foot 58 (10)
145.	AS Fourchambault (9)	0–1	Sud Nivernais Imphy Decize (6)
146.	AS Neuvyssois (10)	0–4	US Cheminots Paray (6)
147.	USC Franco-Portugais Garchizy (10)	1–1 (5–4 p)	ES Toulon-sur-Arroux (10)
148.	US Gillyssoise (10)	1–2	FC Nevers 58 (8)
149.	Grury Issy Foot (11)	0–8	ASA Vauzelles (7)
150.	US Varenne-Saint-Yan (11)	0–3	AS Saint-Benin (7)
151.	Digoin FCA (9)	2–1	US Luzy-Millay (10)
152.	AS Guerigny Urzy (8)	3–1	Chaulgnes FC (9)
153.	US Rigny-sur-Arroux (9)	1–1 (4–3 p)	AS Saint-Vincent-Bragny (9)
154.	CS Corbigeois (9)	0–0 (4–5 p)	FC Vitry-en-Charollais (10)
155.	Viré Lugny Haut Mâconnais (11)	0–6	US Cluny (8)
156.	AS Laizé (10)	0–1	CS Tramayes (11)
157.	US Saint-Bonnet/La Guiche (8)	0–2	AS Chapelloise (6)
158.	FC Dompierre-Matour (10)	0–2	Joncy Salornay Val de Guye (10)
159.	RC Flacé Mâcon (10)	3–1	Sancé FC (10)
160.	US Sennecey-le-Grand et son Canton (8)	0–0 (6–7 p)	Mâcon FC (8)
161.	JS Crechoise (10)	1–3	SR Clayettois (8)
162.	FC La Roche-Vineuse (9)	2–4	JS Mâconnaise (8)
163.	US Saint-Martin-Senozan (10)	0–2	FC Sennecé-lès-Mâcon (9)
164.	Dun Sornin (9)	0–2	UF Mâconnais (6)
165.	UFC de l'Ouche (11)	3–1	ASI Vougeot (11)
166.	AS Canton du Bligny-sur-Ouche (12)	1–4	AS Pouilly-en-Auxois (8)
167.	FC Verdunois (11)	0–2	CL Marsannay-la-Côte (7)
168.	AS Lacanche (10)	1–3	ASC Plombières-Lès-Dijon (9)
169.	AS Gevrey-Chambertin (9)	1–3	ASPTT Dijon (7)
170.	ASC Manlay (10)	0–4	AS Beaune (7)
171.	US Savigny-Chassagne (10)	0–7	FC Corgoloin-Ladoix (8)
172.	ES Pouilloux (10)	1–5	FC Saint-Rémy (9)
173.	FC Bois du Verne (11)	1–9	FC Chalon (6)
174.	ASJ Torcéenne (10)	1–4	JO Le Creusot (7)
175.	SC Etangois (10)	0–2	FLL Gergy-Verjux (9)
176.	FR Saint Marcel (7)	6–1	Chalon ACF (8)
177.	AS Châtenoy-le-Royal (8)	6–0	Saint-Vallier Sport (10)
178.	CS Orion (11)	0–5	CS Sanvignes (7)
179.	Montcenis FC (10)	0–2	Chevigny Saint-Sauveur (7)
180.	AS Cheminots Chagnotins (10)	5–3	US Buxynoise (9)
181.	US Blanzy (9)	3–1	Team Montceau Foot (9)
182.	US Givry-Saint-Désert (10)	1–3	JS Rully (9)
183.	AS Mellecey-Mercurey (10)	1–1 (5–6 p)	AS Quetigny (6)
184.	SLF Sevrey (11)	0–2	JS Montchanin ODRA (7)
185.	ASL Lux (9)	3–1	ESA Breuil (7)
186.	US Crissotine (9)	1–0	EJS Épinacoise (10)
187.	Olympique Mereuil (11)	1–3	FC Marmagne (10)
188.	JS Ouroux-sur-Saône (10)	1–2	Flamboyants Football Chalonnais (10)

=== Second round ===
These matches were played on 5 and 6 September 2020, with one postponed until 19 September 2020.

Second round results: Bourgogne-Franche-Comté
Tie no	Home team (tier)	Score	Away team (tier)
1.	Espérance Arc-Gray (8)	3–1	Tilles FC (9)
2.	Sud Nivernais Imphy Decize (6)	3–0	US Cheminots Paray (6)
3.	ES Saugette Entre-Roches (9)	0–2	AS Levier (6)
4.	US Coteaux de Seille (8)	0–0 (4–3 p)	AS Sornay (8)
5.	FC Nevers 58 (8)	4–1	US Rigny-sur-Arroux (9)
6.	AS Chapelloise (6)	2–0	CL Marsannay-la-Côte (7)
7.	US Franchevelle (9)	1–0	SR Delle (8)
8.	AS Orchamps-Val de Vennes (8)	0–1	FC Champagnole (6)
9.	ES Doubs (8)	0–0 (3–4 p)	AS Guyans-Vennes (9)
10.	CS Frasne (9)	1–1 (7–6 p)	FCC La Joux (7)
11.	RC Saônois (9)	1–1 (6–7 p)	ASC Velotte (10)
12.	AS Saint-Julien-sur-Suran (10)	0–1	Jura Stad' FC (8)
13.	ASFC Belfort (9)	6–1	FC Forges Audincourt (10)
14.	AS Mélisey-Saint Barthélemy (8)	1–1 (5–4 p)	JS Lure (7)
15.	FC Colombe (9)	0–1	US Châtenois-les-Forges (7)
16.	Rougemont Concorde (9)	1–6	AS Audincourt (6)
17.	US Bavans (10)	0–4	US Sochaux (7)
18.	FC Noidanais (7)	1–3	AS Belfort Sud (6)
19.	SC Saint Loup-Corbenay-Magnoncourt (8)	5–0	AS Méziré-Fesches-le-Châtel (8)
20.	Bessoncourt Roppe Club Larivière (7)	2–1	US Pont-de-Roide (6)
21.	ASL Autechaux-Roide (9)	0–6	AS Danjoutin-Andelnans-Méroux (8)
22.	AS Bavilliers (7)	4–0	US Sous-Roches (8)
23.	GLS Club 90 (11)	1–0	Longevelle SC (9)
24.	FC Seloncourt (10)	2–2 (5–4 p)	AS Valentigney (11)
25.	SG Héricourt (8)	7–1	FC Giro-Lepuix (8)
26.	FC Bourogne (12)	1–2	FC Bart (7)
27.	RC Voujeaucourt (10)	0–4	FC Vesoul (6)
28.	ES Pays Maîchois (8)	1–2	US Les Écorces (7)
29.	AS Avoudrey (10)	0–2	Arcade Foot (8)
30.	US Les Quatre Monts (11)	0–4	AS Baume-les-Dames (6)
31.	AS Mont d'Usiers (10)	2–3	FC Haut Jura (8)
32.	Travailleurs Turcs Pontarlier (9)	0–2	AS Château de Joux (9)
33.	ES Dannemarie (9)	2–0	ES Les Fonges 91 (9)
34.	US Grandmont (11)	0–2	ES Fauverney-Rouvres-Bretenière (7)
35.	Dijon ULFE (10)	1–5	FC 4 Rivières 70 (6)
36.	ES Marnaysienne (9)	0–1	Spartak Bressey (10)
37.	US Doubs Sud (10)	3–6	AS Perrouse (7)
38.	US Chanitoise (10)	0–0 (5–4 p)	Poligny-Grimont FC (7)
39.	Thise-Chalezeule FC (10)	0–0 (3–1 p)	US Cheminots Dijonnais (7)
40.	AS Plateau de La Barêche (11)	1–0	FC Grésilles (10)
41.	FC Vingeanne (9)	0–1	CLL Échenon (10)
42.	Entente Roche-Novillars (6)	1–2	US Saint-Vit (6)
43.	FC Les 2 Vels (10)	1–3	FC Mirebellois-Pontailler-Lamarche (8)
44.	PS Dole-Crissey (9)	2–3 (Note: Tie reversed from original draw.)	FC Amagney Marchaux (11)
45.	Jura Nord Foot (10)	1–1 (2–4 p)	FC Montfaucon-Morre-Gennes-La Vèze (7)
46.	ES Héry (9)	0–4	Union Cosnoise Sportive (6)
47.	FC Gatinais en Bourgogne (10)	2–1	ASC Pougues (9)
48.	Entente Châtel-Gérard Nucerien (9)	0–1	Avallon FCO (6)
49.	AS Pouilly-sur-Loire (11)	0–3	CA Saint-Georges (8)
50.	US Varennes (9)	1–0	Fontaine-lès-Dijon FC (7)
51.	La Vaillante Prémery (9)	1–2	Stade Auxerrois (6)
52.	US Semur-Époisses (9)	2–1	ES Val d'Ource (10)
53.	US Dionysienne (10)	2–1	FC Saint Rémy les Montbard (9)
54.	SC Gron Véron (10)	2–3	AJ Sautourienne (10)
55.	RC Entrains (10)	2–5	AS Magny (7)
56.	US Cerisiers (8)	1–3	FC Sens (6)
57.	ES Appoigny (7)	0–2	ASUC Migennes (8)
58.	Olympique Montmorot (9)	1–0	ISS Pleure (10)
59.	FC Épervans (10)	1–2	AS Sagy (7)
60.	US Revermontaise (10)	2–1	AS Condal-Dommartin (11)
61.	FR Rahon (11)	1–4	ALC Longvic (8)
62.	CS Mervans (8)	1–3	Entente Sud Revermont (8)
63.	FR Saint-Maur (10)	0–3	RC Lons-le-Saunier (6)
64.	CS Auxonnais (8)	0–1	AS Foucherans (9)
65.	ASD des DOM (11)	0–0 (2–4 p)	Bresse Jura Foot (7)
66.	EF Villages (8)	0–2	AS Saint Usage Saint-Jean-de-Losne (8)
67.	IS Bresse Nord (10)	5–1	JS Simard (11)
68.	FC Ouges-Fénay (9)	0–1	Jura Lacs Foot (6)
69.	AS Aromas (11)	0–5	CCS Val d'Amour Mont-sous-Vaudrey (7)
70.	ES Pays Charollais (10)	0–1	AS Clamecy (7)
71.	UF La Machine (8)	2–0	Digoin FCA (9)
72.	FC Vitry-en-Charollais (10)	0–4	Étoile Sud Nivernaise 58 (8)
73.	AS Charrin (10)	1–3	AS Guerigny Urzy (8)
74.	Sud Foot 71 (8)	0–3	US Saint-Sernin-du-Bois (6)
75.	FC Château-Chinon-Arleuf (10)	0–4	ASA Vauzelles (7)
76.	FC Nevers Banlay (9)	1–6	AS Saint-Benin (7)
77.	USC Franco-Portugais Garchizy (10)	0–6	US La Charité (6)
78.	US Saint-Pierre Foot 58 (10)	2–3	RC Nevers-Challuy Sermoise (8)
79.	FC Corgoloin-Ladoix (8)	1–9	UF Mâconnais (6)
80.	FC Sennecé-lès-Mâcon (9)	3–1	AS Châtenoy-le-Royal (8)
81.	US Blanzy (9)	0–2	ASPTT Dijon (7)
82.	US Cluny (8)	1–1 (3–4 p)	AS Beaune (7)
83.	JS Mâconnaise (8)	3–0	AS Pouilly-en-Auxois (8)
84.	UFC de l'Ouche (11)	1–4	ASC Plombières-Lès-Dijon (9)
85.	RC Flacé Mâcon (10)	2–1	US Crissotine (9)
86.	Joncy Salornay Val de Guye (10)	0–5	ASL Lux (9)
87.	SR Clayettois (8)	0–4	FC Chalon (6)
88.	Mâcon FC (8)	2–2 (2–4 p)	JO Le Creusot (7)
89.	JS Rully (9)	0–3	CS Sanvignes (7)
90.	FLL Gergy-Verjux (9)	0–4	Chevigny Saint-Sauveur (6)
91.	AS Quetigny (6)	6–1	FR Saint Marcel (7)
92.	CS Tramayes (11)	0–3	JS Montchanin ODRA (7)
93.	FC Marmagne (10)	3–3 (3–1 p)	AS Cheminots Chagnotins (10)
94.	FC Saint-Rémy (9)	2–0	Flamboyants Football Chalonnais (10)

=== Third round ===
These matches were played on 19 and 20 September 2020, with one match postponed until 27 September 2020.

Third round results: Bourgogne-Franche-Comté
Tie no	Home team (tier)	Score	Away team (tier)
1.	AS Saint-Benin (7)	1–3	ASC Saint-Apollinaire (5)
2.	AS Clamecy (7)	0–2	Union Cosnoise Sportive (6)
3.	US Semur-Époisses (9)	0–7	Is-Selongey Football (5)
4.	Étoile Sud Nivernaise 58 (8)	0–4	US La Charité (6)
5.	AJ Sautourienne (10)	1–2	UF La Machine (8)
6.	ASA Vauzelles (7)	9–1	AS Magny (7)
7.	RC Nevers-Challuy Sermoise (8)	2–1	ASUC Migennes (8)
8.	Stade Auxerrois (6)	2–2 (3–5 p)	Sud Nivernais Imphy Decize (6)
9.	JO Le Creusot (7)	2–2 (4–5 p)	FC Sens (6)
10.	FC Nevers 58 (8)	2–3	Paron FC (5)
11.	US Dionysienne (10)	0–1	US Varennes (9)
12.	AS Guerigny Urzy (8)	1–2	CA Saint-Georges (8)
13.	FC Gatinais en Bourgogne (10)	1–1 (2–3 p)	Avallon FCO (6)
14.	ASL Lux (9)	0–2	ASPTT Dijon (7)
15.	US Revermontaise (10)	1–2	AS Chapelloise (6)
16.	ASC Plombières-Lès-Dijon (9)	7–2	IS Bresse Nord (10)
17.	JS Mâconnaise (8)	3–4	UF Mâconnais (6)
18.	FC Chalon (6)	2–1	AS Quetigny (6)
19.	FC Marmagne (10)	2–5	RC Flacé Mâcon (10)
20.	FC Saint-Rémy (9)	0–6	Jura Lacs Foot (6)
21.	US Saint-Sernin-du-Bois (6)	1–1 (9–10 p)	Bresse Jura Foot (7)
22.	AS Beaune (7)	3–3 (2–4 p)	Jura Dolois Foot (5)
23.	CS Sanvignes (7)	1–2	FC Gueugnon (5)
24.	FC Sennecé-lès-Mâcon (9)	0–1	AS Sagy (7)
25.	JS Montchanin ODRA (7)	0–1	FC Montceau Bourgogne (5)
26.	Arcade Foot (8)	0–0 (3–4 p)	ES Dannemarie (9)
27.	AS Foucherans (9)	1–5	Racing Besançon (5)
28.	ALC Longvic (8)	1–0 (Note: Tie reversed from original draw.)	Spartak Bressey (10)
29.	FC Haut Jura (8)	0–4	US Coteaux de Seille (8)
30.	FC Champagnole (6)	1–1 (4–2 p)	CCS Val d'Amour Mont-sous-Vaudrey (7)
31.	FC Mirebellois-Pontailler-Lamarche (8)	0–4	Besançon Football (5)
32.	US Saint-Vit (6)	0–2	CA Pontarlier (5)
33.	US Chanitoise (10)	0–9	RC Lons-le-Saunier (6)
34.	Thise-Chalezeule FC (10)	0–1	Jura Stad' FC (8)
35.	FC Montfaucon-Morre-Gennes-La Vèze (7)	1–1 (3–5 p)	Entente Sud Revermont (8)
36.	Olympique Montmorot (9)	2–3	AS Perrouse (7)
37.	Espérance Arc-Gray (8)	1–1 (1–4 p)	Chevigny Saint-Sauveur (6)
38.	AS Plateau de La Barêche (11)	1–4	AS Saint Usage Saint-Jean-de-Losne (8)
39.	ASC Velotte (10)	1–3	FC 4 Rivières 70 (6)
40.	CLL Échenon (10)	0–0 (9–8 p)	ES Fauverney-Rouvres-Bretenière (7)
41.	FC Seloncourt (10)	1–4	FC Vesoul (6)
42.	US Châtenois-les-Forges (7)	2–1	AS Mélisey-Saint Barthélemy (8)
43.	CS Frasne (9)	1–1 (4–2 p)	AS Baume-les-Dames (6)
44.	US Sochaux (7)	2–2 (6–5 p)	Bessoncourt Roppe Club Larivière (7)
45.	SG Héricourt (8)	1–4	FC Morteau-Montlebon (5)
46.	FC Bart (7)	10–1	FC Amagney Marchaux (11)
47.	US Les Écorces (7)	2–1	AS Levier (6)
48.	AS Guyans-Vennes (9)	0–8	FC Grandvillars (5)
49.	ASFC Belfort (9)	1–5	AS Audincourt (6)
50.	US Franchevelle (9)	3–5	AS Bavilliers (7)
51.	GLS Club 90 (11)	0–6	AS Danjoutin-Andelnans-Méroux (8)
52.	SC Saint Loup-Corbenay-Magnoncourt (8)	0–6	AS Belfort Sud (6)
53.	AS Château de Joux (9)	0–4	FC Valdahon-Vercel (5)

=== Fourth round ===
These matches were played on 3 and 4 October 2020, with one postponed to 10 October and one postponed to 11 October.

Fourth round results: Bourgogne-Franche-Comté
Tie no	Home team (tier)	Score	Away team (tier)
1.	CA Saint-Georges (8)	0–4	Paron FC (5)
2.	FC Gueugnon (5)	1–0	Sud Nivernais Imphy Decize (6)
3.	FC Chalon (6)	0–3	Louhans-Cuiseaux FC (4)
4.	US La Charité (6)	0–2	FC Sens (6)
5.	Avallon FCO (6)	2–3	Union Cosnoise Sportive (6)
6.	US Varennes (9)	2–2 (4–5 p)	ASA Vauzelles (7)
7.	UF La Machine (8)	0–1	RC Nevers-Challuy Sermoise (8)
8.	Is-Selongey Football (5)	2–1	FC Montceau Bourgogne (5)
9.	Jura Stad' FC (8)	1–6	Racing Besançon (5)
10.	CLL Échenon (10)	0–6	AS Saint Usage Saint-Jean-de-Losne (8)
11.	ALC Longvic (8)	2–2 (4–3 p)	ASPTT Dijon (7)
12.	Chevigny Saint-Sauveur (6)	0–2	Jura Dolois Foot (5)
13.	FC Champagnole (6)	0–1	Jura Sud Foot (4)
14.	UF Mâconnais (6)	4–0	AS Chapelloise (6)
15.	US Coteaux de Seille (8)	2–3	Jura Lacs Foot (6)
16.	AS Sagy (7)	1–3	RC Lons-le-Saunier (6)
17.	ASC Saint-Apollinaire (5)	2–0	Besançon Football (5)
18.	Bresse Jura Foot (7)	6–2	Entente Sud Revermont (8)
19.	RC Flacé Mâcon (10)	2–2 (4–5 p)	ASC Plombières-Lès-Dijon (9)
20.	FC Morteau-Montlebon (5)	2–0	FC Vesoul (6)
21.	ES Dannemarie (9)	0–8	ASM Belfort (4)
22.	US Les Écorces (7)	0–3	CA Pontarlier (5)
23.	AS Danjoutin-Andelnans-Méroux (8)	0–1	US Châtenois-les-Forges (7)
24.	FC Bart (7)	0–1	FC Valdahon-Vercel (5)
25.	FC Grandvillars (5)	1–2	AS Audincourt (6)
26.	CS Frasne (9)	0–3	AS Bavilliers (7)
27.	AS Perrouse (7)	1–4	AS Belfort Sud (6)
28.	FC 4 Rivières 70 (6)	1–2	US Sochaux (7)

=== Fifth round ===
These matches were played on 17 and 18 October 2020, with two postponed to 21 and 25 October 2020.

Fifth round results: Bourgogne-Franche-Comté
Tie no	Home team (tier)	Score	Away team (tier)
1.	Is-Selongey Football (5)	1–0	FC Gueugnon (5)
2.	AS Saint Usage Saint-Jean-de-Losne (8)	2–2 (4–5 p)	UF Mâconnais (6)
3.	ALC Longvic (8)	1–7	Louhans-Cuiseaux FC (4)
4.	FC Sens (6)	0–2	Jura Dolois Foot (5)
5.	Union Cosnoise Sportive (6)	2–0	Paron FC (5)
6.	ASC Plombières-Lès-Dijon (9)	2–4	ASA Vauzelles (7)
7.	RC Nevers-Challuy Sermoise (8)	1–2	ASC Saint-Apollinaire (5)
8.	US Sochaux (7)	0–2 (Note: Tie reversed from original draw.)	AS Belfort Sud (6)
9.	RC Lons-le-Saunier (6)	0–0 (2–4 p)	Racing Besançon (5)
10.	AS Audincourt (6)	0–1	ASM Belfort (4)
11.	AS Bavilliers (7)	1–3	FC Morteau-Montlebon (5)
12.	Jura Lacs Foot (6)	0–2	Jura Sud Foot (4)
13.	US Châtenois-les-Forges (7)	0–3	CA Pontarlier (5)
14.	Bresse Jura Foot (7)	1–3	FC Valdahon-Vercel (5)

=== Sixth round ===
These matches were played on 31 January 2021.

Sixth round results: Bourgogne-Franche-Comté
Tie no	Home team (tier)	Score	Away team (tier)
1.	AS Belfort Sud (6)	0–5	Jura Sud Foot (4)
2.	Racing Besançon (5)	1–0	ASC Saint-Apollinaire (5)
3.	UF Mâconnais (6)	2–2 (4–3 p)	Is-Selongey Football (5)
4.	FC Morteau-Montlebon (5)	1–2	Union Cosnoise Sportive (6)
5.	ASA Vauzelles (7)	1–4	ASM Belfort (4)
6.	Jura Dolois Foot (5)	1–1 (8–9 p)	Louhans-Cuiseaux FC (4)
7.	FC Valdahon-Vercel (5)	0–2	CA Pontarlier (5)
