= 2025–26 Coupe de France preliminary rounds, Bourgogne-Franche-Comté =

The 2025–26 Coupe de France preliminary rounds, Bourgogne-Franche-Comté was the qualifying competition to decide which teams from the leagues of the Bourgogne-Franche-Comté region of France took part in the main competition from the seventh round.

A total of nine teams qualified from the Bourgogne-Franche-Comté preliminary rounds.

In 2024–25, FC Sochaux-Montbéliard progressed furthest in the main competition from the region. They reached the Round of 32 before losing a lengthy penalty shoot-out to Ligue 2 side En Avant Guingamp.

== Draws and fixtures ==
The first round draw for the competition took place on 11 July 2025, and was published by the league four days later. At the same time, the league confirmed that 381 clubs from the region would take part in the competition, and that the first round would consist of 117 ties. All the teams involved at this stage would come from the departmental divisions, with 17 teams from these divisions exempted to the second round. Amendments were made after the initial draw. On 17 July 2025, the league announced that two first round fixtures would be cancelled, and the four participating teams given byes to the second round, due to the confirmation of Jura Sud Foot being engaged in Championnat National 3. On 12 August 2025, the league announced that they would have to add back one of the cancelled fixtures, by drawing of lots, due to the confirmation that ASPTT Dijon would play in Championnat National 3.

The second round draw was published on 19 August 2025, prior to the first round being completed, with the entry into the competition of the departmental division teams exempted from the first round, and the teams from the regional divisions. The third round draw was published on 2 September 2025, with the teams from Championnat National 3 entering at this stage. The fourth round draw was published on 16 September 2025. The fifth round draw, featuring the two teams from Championnat National, was published on 30 September 2025. The sixth round draw was published on 14 October 2025.

=== First round ===
These matches were played on 23 and 24 August 2025.

First Round Results: Bourgogne-Franche-Comté
Tie no	Home team (Tier)	Score	Away team (Tier)
1.	Chaulgnes FC (10)	0–5	ASC Pougues (9)
2.	US Cercycoise (10)	0–1	AS Varzy (10)
3.	Étoile Sud Nivernaise 58 (9)	5–2	CIE Imphy (9)
4.	US Moulinoise (9)	0–1	AS Charrin (9)
5.	FC Alligny-Saint-Amand (10)	5–1	JS Tannay (11)
6.	AS Pouilly-sur-Loire (10)	1–0	CS Bazois (10)
7.	CS Corbigeois (9)	4–2	US Luzy-Millay (10)
8.	US La Charité (9)	0–3 (Note: Tie won by means of forfeit.)	FREP Luthenay-Uxeloup (10)
9.	AS Dijon Sud (11)	1–0	AFC Champigny-sur-Yonne (9)
10.	FC Champs-sur-Yonne (9)	1–0	FC Coulanges-la-Vineuse (10)
11.	SC Vitteaux (11)	0–7	FC Monéteau (9)
12.	Aillant SF (10)	1–1 (6–5 p)	FC Chevannes (11)
13.	Nouvelle Étoile Colombine (11)	3–2	AS Pouilly-en-Auxois (10)
14.	Auxerre Sports Citoyen (9)	3–3 (3–0 p)	SC Gron Véron (10)
15.	ES Vinneuf Courlon (10)	2–4	FC Sombernon-Gissey (10)
16.	US Semur-Époisses (10)	8–1	US Vermenton (9)
17.	UFC Ouche (12)	3–1	FC Quarré Saint-Germain (11)
18.	FC Gatinais en Bourgogne (11)	3–3 (6–7 p)	US Toucycoise (9)
19.	Entente Châtel-Gérard Nucerien (9)	2–2 (4–1 p)	AS Montoise (9)
20.	US Dionysienne (10)	7–0	ESIV Saint-Sérotin (10)
21.	FC Saint-Rémy-les-Montbard (9)	1–0	Montbard Venarey Football (9)
22.	EJS Épinacoise (11)	0–5	US Buxynoise (9)
23.	AS Cheminots Chagnotins (10)	0–5	US Rully Fontaines (9)
24.	AS Fontaine d'Ouche (10)	3–2	US Givry-Saint-Désert (10)
25.	AS Lacanche (10)	0–0 (4–3 p)	ASC Manlay (11)
26.	FC des 2 Côtes Corgoloin-Ladoix (9)	4–2	US Crissotine (9)
27.	SC Etangois (10)	1–1 (2–3 p)	FLL Gergy-Verjux (10)
28.	AS Canton du Bligny-sur-Ouche (11)	0–1	FC Saint-Rémy-les-Montbard (10)
29.	AS Varennes-le-Grand (10)	3–0	Champforgeuil FC (11)
30.	EFC Demigny (10)	0–2	Joncy Salornay Val de Guye (10)
31.	ASL Lux (10)	3–1	US Savigny-lès-Beaune (11)
32.	Entente Aiserey-Izeure FC / ES Tart-Varanges (10)	4–0	Dinamo Dijon (11)
33.	CS Auxonnais (10)	2–0	Gresilles FC (11)
34.	FC Jeunesse Mahoraise (11)	7–0 (Note: Tie reversed from original draw.)	AS Cessey-sur-Tille (11)
35.	Football Champdotre Longeault Association (11)	1–5	AS Poussots (11)
36.	Dijon ULFE (9)	8–1	ASFC Daix (10)
37.	ASD des DOM (11)	2–2 (2–3 p)	FC Remilly (11)
38.	PS Dole-Crissey (10)	1–3	ASC Plombières-Lès-Dijon (9)
39.	Jura Stad' FC (10)	1–4	CF Talant (9)
40.	AS Moissey (11)	0–3	AS Saint-Aubin (10)
41.	AS Villersexel Esprels (10)	0–0 (2–4 p)	US Val de Pesmes (9)
42.	AS Fougerolles (10)	1–1 (6–5 p)	US Marey-Cussey (10)
43.	FC Seveux-Motey (10)	4–3	Espérance Arc-Gray (9)
44.	FC Aignay Baigneux (11)	0–0 (1–3 p)	RC Saônois (9)
45.	FC Val de Saône (10)	3–4	FEP Autrey-lès-Gray (9)
46.	US Franchevelle (9)	4–2	FC Monts de Gy (10)
47.	Olympique Chaignay (10)	3–1	FC Saulon-Corcelles (10)
48.	Val de Norge FC (10)	7–0	FC Haute Vallée de l'Ognon (10)
49.	FC Colombe (10)	5–0	AS Magny-Vernois (10)
50.	FC Mirebellois-Pontailler-Lamarche (10)	1–4	FC Neuilly-Crimolois Sennecey (9)
51.	AJ Saint-Forgeot (12)	1–2	Grury Issy Foot (11)
52.	Génelard Perrecy FC (11)	1–1 (6–5 p)	JF Palingeois (10)
53.	US Blanzy (9)	1–0	HLS Football (9)
54.	Flamboyants Football Chalonnais (11)	6–0	ES Pouilloux (11)
55.	FC Bois du Verne (11)	2–2 (4–3 p)	FC La Roche-Vineuse (10)
56.	AS Ciry-le-Noble (11)	0–4	Gachères FC (10)
57.	FC Clessé (9)	1–1 (5–4 p)	US Saint-Bonnet/La Guiche (9)
58.	JS Crechoise (9)	1–2	CS Orion (10)
59.	FC Vitry-en-Charollais (10)	0–0 (4–3 p)	FC Marmagne (10)
60.	AS Vendenesse (10)	0–0 (2–4 p)	Dun Sornin Chauffailles Brionnais (9)
61.	Montcenis FC (10)	4–1	FC Uxeau (11)
62.	JS Montchanin ODRA (9)	4–2	CS Tramayes (10)
63.	AS Neuvyssois (9)	1–1 (4–5 p)	Saint-Vallier Sport (10)
64.	AS Saint-Vincent-Bragny (9)	1–0	US Charolles (11)
65.	AS Tournus (10)	0–3	Sud Foot 71 (9)
66.	ISS Pleure (9)	0–3	FC Aiglepierre (10)
67.	FR Archelange-Gredisans-Menotey (10)	1–4	Entente Sud Revermont (9)
68.	GC Beaufort (11)	2–1	AS Montbarrey (11)
69.	FC Plaine 39 (10)	0–5	CS Mervans (9)
70.	AS Aromas (10)	1–0	JS Simard (11)
71.	AS Souvans Nevy (11)	2–0	AS Frangy-en-Bresse (11)
72.	USL Beaurepaire (11)	0–3	US Saint-Germain-du-Bois (11)
73.	IS Bresse Nord (11)	2–1	IS Saint-Usuge (11)
74.	US San Martinoise (11)	3–1	US Chapelle-Voland (11)
75.	ES Branges (10)	1–9	ES Saint-Germain-du-Plaine-Baudrières (10)
76.	AS Sagy (9)	1–1 (4–1 p)	SC Châteaurenaud (9)
77.	AS Vaux-lès-Saint-Claude (11)	1–1 (3–4 p)	US Revermontaise (10)
78.	FC Brenne-Orain (10)	– (Note: Match cancelled due to restructuring of the round. Both teams qualify for round 2.)	RCF Saint-Claude (10)
79.	FC Plateau 39 (11)	4–0	US Lessard-en-Bresse (9)
80.	FC Petite Montagne (9)	3–2	ES Montponnaise (10)
81.	Amancey-Bolandoz-Chantrans Foot (10)	1–1 (3–5 p)	FC Val de Loue (9)
82.	Arche FC (11)	1–0	FC Châtillon-Devecey (11)
83.	Esperance Auxons-Miserey (10)	2–1	ES Sirod (9)
84.	US Avanne-Aveney (11)	1–3	Entente Le Châteleu (10)
85.	FC Bosna Besançon (11)	2–6	ES Les Sapins (10)
86.	AS Besançon Espérance (9)	7–0	Grandvaux Foot (10)
87.	AS Beure (11)	0–1	SC Besançon (9)
88.	ASC Velotte (10)	2–2 (5–4 p)	FC Lac-Remoray-Vaux (11)
89.	FC Massif Haut Doubs (10)	0–3	AS Sâone-Mamirolle (9)
90.	FC Roset-Fluans (12)	2–0	AS Haut Lison (11)
91.	Travailleurs Turcs Pontarlier (11)	0–4	FC Grand Besançon (9)
92.	FC Haut Jura (9)	3–3 (4–3 p)	Thise-Chalezeule FC (10)
93.	AS Mont d'Usiers (9)	2–0	FC Mouchard-Arc-et-Senans (9)
94.	US Doubs Sud (11)	1–4	RC Voujeaucourt (10)
95.	UOP Mathay (9)	3–3 (7–6 p)	AS Rougegoutte-Chaux (10)
96.	FC 3 Cantons (9)	– (Note: Match abandoned after 59 minutes. The disciplinary commission of the league ruled that both clubs were disqualified from the competition.)	AS Essert (10)
97.	US Arcey (10)	2–2 (8–7 p)	US Sous-Roches (10)
98.	AS Sainte-Suzanne (12)	4–5	SR Villars-sous-Dampjoux (10)
99.	AS Chèvremont (11)	3–3 (2–4 p)	ASC Montbéliard (11)
100.	FC Bourogne (12)	1–1 (5–4 p)	ES Exincourt-Taillecourt (9)
101.	FC Clerval Anteuil (11)	0–7	FC Giro-Lepuix (9)
102.	US Roches-lès-Blamont (11)	0–1	AS Nord Territoire (9)
103.	Olympique Courcelles-lès-Montbéliard (10)	5–0	AS Dambelin (11)
104.	Dampierre Foot (10)	3–0	FC Pays de Luxeuil (9)
105.	FC Suarce (10)	5–4	AO Vesoul (9)
106.	Rougemont Concorde (9)	0–2	Vallée du Breuchin FC (9)
107.	US Les Fontenelles (10)	2–0	Belleherbe Sancey Foot (11)
108.	AS Guyans-Vennes (10)	4–1	US Les Quatre Monts (10)
109.	Espérance Monts de Villers (11)	2–3	FC Premier Plateau (11)
110.	US Les Fins (10)	1–2 (Note: SC Villers-le-Lac penalised. Reason unknown. US Les Fins qualify.)	SC Villers-le-Lac (10)
111.	ES Bretonvillers Charmoille (11)	1–5	FC Liévremont-Arçon (10)
112.	ES Saugette Entre-Roches (9)	10–0	AS Courtefontaine-Les Plains (10)
113.	FC Plaimbois-du-Miroir (10)	1–4	AS Orchamps-Val de Vennes (9)
114.	AS Avoudrey (11)	2–0	AS Pierrefontaine et Laviron (11)
115.	US Saint Hippolyte (11)	0–6	AS Montandon (11)
116.	ES Les Fonges 91 (10)	2–1	AS Plateau de La Barêche (10)
117.	US Passavant (11)	0–1	FC Le Russey (10)

=== Second round ===
These matches were played on 30 and 31 August 2025.

Second Round Results: Bourgogne-Franche-Comté
Tie no	Home team (Tier)	Score	Away team (Tier)
1.	ÉS Donziaise (11)	2–1	ASUC Migennes (8)
2.	AS Guerigny Urzy (8)	3–3 (3–4 p)	Étoile Sud Nivernaise 58 (9)
3.	AS Garchizy (6)	1–1 (3–1 p)	ASA Vauzelles (6)
4.	FC Decize (7)	3–1	Paron FC (8)
5.	FC Alligny-Saint-Amand (10)	1–4	UF La Machine (8)
6.	FREP Luthenay-Uxeloup (10)	1–4	AS Charrin (9)
7.	AS Varzy (10)	1–4	FC Nevers Banlay (8)
8.	ASC Pougues (9)	0–3	ES Appoigny (7)
9.	CS Corbigeois (9)	0–1	RC Nevers-Challuy Sermoise (8)
10.	FC Nevers 58 (7)	2–0	US Coulanges-lès-Nevers (8)
11.	AS Pouilly-sur-Loire (10)	1–2	FC Sens (6)
12.	FC Champs-sur-Yonne (9)	1–1 (5–6 p)	AS Magny (8)
13.	US Dionysienne (10)	4–2	Union Châtillonnaise Côte-d'Or Football (7)
14.	US Joigny (9)	2–1	Stade Auxerrois (7)
15.	FC Sombernon-Gissey (10)	0–4	FC Gueugnon (6)
16.	Amicale Franco-Portugais Sens (8)	2–1	EF Villages (7)
17.	Entente Châtel-Gérard Nucerien (9)	0–3	Avallon FCO (7)
18.	AS Dijon Sud (11)	1–3	Auxerre Sports Citoyen (9)
19.	US Toucycoise (9)	0–4	AS Gurgy (8)
20.	AS Sergines (10)	3–1	UF Tonnerrois (8)
21.	US Semur-Époisses (10)	2–2 (2–4 p)	Entente Saint-Florentin FC (8)
22.	UFC Ouche (12)	0–0 (3–4 p)	Nouvelle Étoile Colombine (11)
23.	Aillant SF (10)	1–2	US Cerisiers (8)
24.	FC Saint-Rémy-les-Montbard (10)	2–3	US Varennes (8)
25.	FC Monéteau (9)	0–2	AS Clamecy (8)
26.	US Buxynoise (9)	1–1 (5–4 p)	AS Varennes-le-Grand (10)
27.	FLL Gergy-Verjux (10)	0–3	AS Lacanche (10)
28.	FC Saint-Rémy-les-Montbard (10)	0–2	AS Châtenoy-le-Royal (8)
29.	Team Montceau Foot (8)	1–1 (3–1 p)	Chalon ACF (7)
30.	CS Sanvignes (8)	1–2	Chevigny Saint-Sauveur (7)
31.	AS Gevrey-Chambertin (8)	0–3	Is-Selongey Football (6)
32.	US Rully Fontaines (9)	2–3	Joncy Salornay Val de Guye (10)
33.	US Nolay (11)	0–8	ALC Longvic (7)
34.	AS Fontaine d'Ouche (10)	1–1 (0–3 p)	FC des 2 Côtes Corgoloin-Ladoix (9)
35.	ASL Lux (10)	0–3	Fontaine-lès-Dijon FC (7)
36.	FC Remilly (11)	5–1	Municipaux de Dijon (11)
37.	AS Beaune (7)	0–0 (6–5 p)	ASC Saint-Apollinaire (6)
38.	FC Macornay Val de Sorne (8)	1–1 (3–2 p)	FC Rochefort Athletic (8)
39.	AS Foucherans (10)	0–3	US Cheminots Dijonnais (6)
40.	AS Saint-Aubin (10)	1–0	Entente Aiserey-Izeure FC / ES Tart-Varanges (10)
41.	CF Talant (9)	3–4	US Saint-Vit (7)
42.	Jura Nord Foot (8)	4–2	Triangle d'Or Jura Foot (8)
43.	AS Poussots (11)	2–4	Dijon ULFE (9)
44.	ASC Plombières-Lès-Dijon (9)	4–3	CL Marsannay-la-Côte (7)
45.	AS Saint Usage Saint-Jean-de-Losne (8)	1–2	AS Quetigny (7)
46.	FC Jeunesse Mahoraise (11)	2–4	CS Auxonnais (10)
47.	US Val de Pesmes (9)	0–1	JS Lure (7)
48.	FC Colombe (10)	0–3	Rioz FC (6)
49.	Val de Norge FC (10)	0–2	FC Noidanais (7)
50.	Tilles FC (8)	1–0	FC Vesoul (6)
51.	US Franchevelle (9)	1–1 (6–5 p)	Olympique Chaignay (10)
52.	FC Seveux-Motey (10)	1–0	AF Audeux/Pelousey/Pouilley-les-Vignes (8)
53.	RC Saônois (9)	1–4	ES Fauverney-Rouvres-Bretenière (7)
54.	FC Neuilly-Crimolois Sennecey (9)	0–5	AS Genlis (8)
55.	AS Fougerolles (10)	0–5	FC 4 Rivières 70 (7)
56.	FC Vingeanne (11)	1–1 (5–4 p)	FEP Autrey-lès-Gray (9)
57.	Haute-Lizaine Pays d'Héricourt (8)	2–2 (4–3 p)	ÉS Marnaysienne (8)
58.	US Saint-Sernin-du-Bois (7)	0–4	AS Mellecey-Mercurey (8)
59.	ÉSA Breuil (9)	3–0	SR Clayettois (8)
60.	US Cluny (8)	2–1	JS Montchanin ODRA (9)
61.	Dun Sornin Chauffailles Brionnais (9)	0–4	AS Sornay (7)
62.	AS Chapelloise (6)	0–0 (3–5 p)	Digoin FCA (7)
63.	US Rigny-sur-Arroux (8)	1–5	US Bourbon-Lancy FPT (8)
64.	Sud Foot 71 (9)	0–4	Mâcon FC (8)
65.	FC Vitry-en-Charollais (10)	0–7	US Cheminots Paray (7)
66.	Montcenis FC (10)	1–5	FC Sennecé-lès-Mâcon (8)
67.	Gachères FC (10)	0–2	FC Clessé (9)
68.	AS Saint-Agnan (10)	3–2	FC Bois du Verne (11)
69.	Saint-Vallier Sport (10)	– (Note: Saint-Vallier Sport penalised for fielding a player with an invalid license. RC Bresse Sud qualified.)	RC Bresse Sud (8)
70.	CS Orion (10)	3–1	Flamboyants Football Chalonnais (11)
71.	US Blanzy (9)	10–1	RCF Saint-Claude (10)
72.	Génelard Perrecy FC (11)	1–3	AS Saint-Vincent-Bragny (9)
73.	Grury Issy Foot (11)	1–11	FC Montceau Bourgogne (6)
74.	JO Le Creusot (8)	2–1	FCC La Joux (7)
75.	Olympique Montmorot (8)	1–1 (8–9 p)	Bresse Jura Foot (8)
76.	Entente Sud Revermont (9)	1–1 (4–2 p)	FC Petite Montagne (9)
77.	FC Champagnole (7)	2–2 (7–6 p)	CCS Val d'Amour Mont-sous-Vaudrey (7)
78.	FC Aiglepierre (10)	2–2 (2–4 p)	AS Sagy (9)
79.	US Saint-Germain-du-Bois (11)	1–1 (4–5 p)	IS Bresse Nord (11)
80.	CS Mervans (9)	2–2 (4–1 p)	FC Brenne-Orain (10)
81.	US Sennecey-le-Grand et son Canton (8)	1–2	Poligny-Grimont FC (7)
82.	FC Cuiseaux-Varennes (9)	0–9	FR Saint Marcel (6)
83.	US Revermontaise (10)	0–6	Louhans-Cuiseaux FC (6)
84.	US San Martinoise (11)	1–3	AS Aromas (10)
85.	FC Plateau 39 (11)	1–1 (5–4 p)	GC Beaufort (11)
86.	FC Courlaoux (10)	0–4	AS Souvans Nevy (11)
87.	ES Saint-Germain-du-Plaine-Baudrières (10)	0–2	RC Lons-le-Saunier (7)
88.	AS Mont d'Usiers (9)	1–3	FC Haut Jura (9)
89.	Entente Le Châteleu (10)	1–2	AS Perrouse (8)
90.	FC Roset-Fluans (12)	1–1 (4–5 p)	US Crotenay Combe d'Ain (9)
91.	Arche FC (11)	6–4	SC Besançon (9)
92.	FC Arlay (11)	0–1	AS Besançon Espérance (9)
93.	Arcade Foot (8)	2–4	FC Grand Besançon (9)
95.	CS Frasne (8)	1–1 (3–2 p)	AS Château de Joux (7)
96.	ASC Velotte (10)	0–2	US Coteaux de Seille (7)
97.	FC Val de Loue (9)	0–5	FC Morteau-Montlebon (6)
98.	FC Montfaucon-Morre-Gennes-La Vèze (7)	2–1	AS Ornans (6)
99.	AS Levier (7)	1–1 (4–3 p)	Jura Lacs Foot (8)
100.	ES Les Sapins (10)	2–1	Esperance Auxons-Miserey (10)
101.	AS Sâone-Mamirolle (9)	0–3	ÉS Doubs (8)
102.	ASC Montbéliard (11)	2–4	Dampierre Foot (10)
103.	AS Nord Territoire (9)	2–5	FC Bart (7)
104.	FC Pays Minier (8)	0–8	FC Grandvillars (6)
105.	AS Présentevillers Sainte-Marie (11)	0–5	AS Baume-les-Dames (7)
106.	US Larians-et-Munans (8)	2–1	AS Danjoutin-Andelnans-Méroux (7)
107.	FC Suarce (10)	2–5	AS Belfort Sud (8)
108.	AS Bavilliers (7)	5–2	ASFC Belfort (8)
109.	Olympique Courcelles-lès-Montbéliard (10)	–	Bye (Round 1 Match 96)
110.	FC Bourogne (12)	2–2 (4–3 p)	FC Giro-Lepuix (9)
111.	Vallée du Breuchin FC (9)	1–1 (3–2 p)	ASC Besançon Mahoraise (8)
112.	SR Villars-sous-Dampjoux (10)	0–2	US Arcey (10)
113.	SC Saint Loup-Corbenay-Magnoncourt (8)	1–6	AS Audincourt (6)
114.	SR Delle (10)	0–1	UOP Mathay (9)
115.	RC Voujeaucourt (10)	1–4	Bessoncourt Roppe Club Larivière (8)
116.	FC Seloncourt (8)	2–0	ES Pays Maîchois (6)
117.	AS Guyans-Vennes (10)	0–0 (3–4 p)	US Châtenois-les-Forges (8)
118.	AS Noël-Cerneux-Chenalotte (11)	0–3	ES Saugette Entre-Roches (9)
119.	ES Les Fonges 91 (10)	0–0 (3–0 p)	Entente Roche-Novillars (8)
120.	FC Le Russey (10)	5–0	AS Avoudrey (11)
121.	US Les Fontenelles (10)	1–1 (3–4 p)	AS Orchamps-Val de Vennes (9)
122.	US Pont-de-Roide-Vermondans (6)	4–0	FC Valdahon-Vercel (7)
123.	FC Liévremont-Arçon (10)	1–1 (3–4 p)	AS Mélisey-Saint Barthélemy (7)
124.	FC Premier Plateau (11)	2–1	US Les Fins (10)
125.	AS Montandon (11)	0–5	FC Villars-l'Isle-Saint-Maurice-Colombier-Blussans (7)
126.	AS Méziré-Fesches (8)	3–2	US Sochaux (8)
127.	ÉS Charquemont (11)	1–4	US Les Écorces (8)

=== Third round ===
These matches were played on 13 and 14 September 2025, with one postponed to 21 September 2025 awaiting outcome of an appeal.

Third Round Results: Bourgogne-Franche-Comté
Tie no	Home team (Tier)	Score	Away team (Tier)
1.	UF La Machine (8)	1–1 (1–3 p)	FC Nevers 58 (7)
2.	Nouvelle Étoile Colombine (11)	0–1	Entente Saint-Florentin FC (8)
3.	AS Charrin (9)	0–5	FC Sens (6)
4.	AS Clamecy (8)	1–1 (7–8 p)	AS Magny (8)
5.	Étoile Sud Nivernaise 58 (9)	5–0	AS Sergines (10)
6.	Auxerre Sports Citoyen (9)	0–0 (3–4 p)	FC Decize (7)
7.	US Joigny (9)	3–3 (4–5 p)	ASPTT Dijon (5)
8.	Avallon FCO (7)	4–0	US Varennes (8)
9.	ÉS Donziaise (11)	0–3	ES Appoigny (7)
10.	US Cerisiers (8)	3–4	AS Garchizy (6)
11.	US Dionysienne (10)	1–1 (2–5 p)	Amicale Franco-Portugais Sens (8)
12.	AS Gurgy (8)	1–4	US Cheminots Paray (7)
13.	Digoin FCA (7)	1–1 (4–1 p)	Union Cosnoise Sportive (5)
14.	US Bourbon-Lancy FPT (8)	0–0 (4–2 p) (Note: US Bourbon-Lancy FPT penalised for fielding an incorrectly registered player. AS Saint-Vincent-Bragny qualified.)	AS Saint-Vincent-Bragny (9)
15.	ES Fauverney-Rouvres-Bretenière (7)	1–3	RC Lons-le-Saunier (7)
16.	Mâcon FC (8)	1–1 (4–2 p)	Louhans-Cuiseaux FC (6)
17.	AS Saint-Agnan (10)	0–3	FC Chalon (5)
18.	FC Clessé (9)	3–4	CS Orion (10)
19.	CS Mervans (9)	0–4	FC Montceau Bourgogne (6)
20.	Joncy Salornay Val de Guye (10)	1–5	FC Nevers Banlay (8)
21.	US Buxynoise (9)	0–4	US Coteaux de Seille (7)
22.	RC Bresse Sud (8)	1–1 (2–4 p)	ÉSA Breuil (9)
23.	IS Bresse Nord (11)	1–4	Team Montceau Foot (8)
24.	JO Le Creusot (8)	2–2 (2–3 p)	FC Gueugnon (6)
25.	RC Nevers-Challuy Sermoise (8)	4–2	US Cluny (8)
26.	US Blanzy (9)	1–3	AS Beaune (7)
27.	AS Sornay (7)	2–10	Mâcon 71 (5)
28.	AS Saint-Aubin (10)	1–1 (3–4 p)	Tilles FC (8)
29.	AS Sagy (9)	0–4	ALC Longvic (7)
30.	FC Vingeanne (11)	1–2	Poligny-Grimont FC (7)
31.	AS Châtenoy-le-Royal (8)	3–2	FC Macornay Val de Sorne (8)
32.	Dijon ULFE (9)	2–7	Jura Dolois Football (5)
33.	CS Auxonnais (10)	0–2	Chevigny Saint-Sauveur (7)
34.	AS Mellecey-Mercurey (8)	0–0 (3–1 p)	Jura Sud Foot (5)
35.	ASC Plombières-Lès-Dijon (9)	3–2	FC Champagnole (7)
36.	AS Lacanche (10)	0–8	Is-Selongey Football (6)
37.	Fontaine-lès-Dijon FC (7)	1–2	FR Saint Marcel (6)
38.	FC Remilly (11)	0–5	US Cheminots Dijonnais (6)
39.	AS Quetigny (7)	3–1 (Note: Tie reversed from original draw.)	AS Genlis (8)
40.	FC des 2 Côtes Corgoloin-Ladoix (9)	5–1	FC Sennecé-lès-Mâcon (8)
41.	Entente Sud Revermont (9)	1–4	US Saint-Vit (7)
42.	FC Morteau-Montlebon (6)	5–0	FC Montfaucon-Morre-Gennes-La Vèze (7)
43.	Bresse Jura Foot (8)	1–1 (1–3 p)	FC Haut Jura (9)
44.	FC Grand Besançon (9)	1–2	CA Pontarlier (5)
45.	FC Seveux-Motey (10)	3–2	Jura Nord Foot (8)
46.	AS Souvans Nevy (11)	2–4	ÉS Doubs (8)
47.	ES Saugette Entre-Roches (9)	2–2 (3–1 p)	FC Noidanais (7)
48.	AS Baume-les-Dames (7)	3–1	CS Frasne (8)
49.	FC Premier Plateau (11)	5–2	Arche FC (11)
50.	AS Levier (7)	1–2	Besançon Football (5)
51.	Rioz FC (6)	4–1	FC 4 Rivières 70 (7)
52.	AS Besançon Espérance (9)	6–0	ES Les Sapins (10)
53.	US Crotenay Combe d'Ain (9)	3–1	US Larians-et-Munans (8)
54.	AS Aromas (10)	0–1	FC Plateau 39 (11)
55.	ES Les Fonges 91 (10)	0–1	AS Perrouse (8)
56.	UOP Mathay (9)	0–1	US Pont-de-Roide-Vermondans (6)
57.	US Les Écorces (8)	0–4	ASM Belfort (5)
58.	US Arcey (10)	1–1 (2–4 p)	Olympique Courcelles-lès-Montbéliard (10)
59.	Vallée du Breuchin FC (9)	1–1 (4–5 p)	FC Seloncourt (8)
60.	US Franchevelle (9)	2–0	AS Mélisey-Saint Barthélemy (7)
61.	AS Belfort Sud (8)	0–6	Racing Besançon (5)
62.	Dampierre Foot (10)	0–4	FC Grandvillars (6)
63.	Haute-Lizaine Pays d'Héricourt (8)	2–1	AS Méziré-Fesches (8)
64.	AS Orchamps-Val de Vennes (9)	1–2	AS Audincourt (6)
65.	Bessoncourt Roppe Club Larivière (8)	2–1	US Châtenois-les-Forges (8)
66.	FC Le Russey (10)	1–3	FC Villars-l'Isle-Saint-Maurice-Colombier-Blussans (7)
67.	FC Bart (7)	5–0	AS Bavilliers (7)
68.	FC Bourogne (12)	0–4	JS Lure (7)

=== Fourth round ===
These matches were played on 27 and 28 September 2025.

Fourth Round Results: Bourgogne-Franche-Comté
Tie no	Home team (Tier)	Score	Away team (Tier)
1.	RC Nevers-Challuy Sermoise (8)	0–0 (3–4 p)	Étoile Sud Nivernaise 58 (9)
2.	FC Decize (7)	0–2	Mâcon 71 (5)
3.	FC Montceau Bourgogne (6)	5–0	Avallon FCO (7)
4.	AS Magny (8)	1–3	US Cheminots Paray (7)
5.	ÉSA Breuil (9)	0–2	FC Gueugnon (6)
6.	FC Nevers 58 (7)	0–1	Digoin FCA (7)
7.	FC des 2 Côtes Corgoloin-Ladoix (9)	0–6	ASPTT Dijon (5)
8.	Amicale Franco-Portugais Sens (8)	0–3	FC Sens (6)
9.	ES Appoigny (7)	2–1	Entente Saint-Florentin FC (8)
10.	FC Nevers Banlay (8)	1–2	AS Garchizy (6)
11.	CS Orion (10)	0–9	FC Chalon (5)
12.	FC Plateau 39 (11)	0–10	CA Pontarlier (5)
13.	Mâcon FC (8)	3–3 (3–2 p)	Rioz FC (6)
14.	AS Beaune (7)	1–0	Tilles FC (8)
15.	AS Châtenoy-le-Royal (8)	1–1 (5–3 p)	AS Mellecey-Mercurey (8)
16.	ALC Longvic (7)	2–2 (4–3 p)	Chevigny Saint-Sauveur (7)
17.	Jura Dolois Football (5)	3–2	US Cheminots Dijonnais (6)
18.	US Coteaux de Seille (7)	0–2	Is-Selongey Football (6)
19.	FC Haut Jura (9)	1–2	AS Quetigny (7)
20.	AS Saint-Vincent-Bragny (9)	2–2 (5–6 p)	RC Lons-le-Saunier (7)
21.	ASC Plombières-Lès-Dijon (9)	1–4	FR Saint Marcel (6)
22.	Team Montceau Foot (8)	2–0	US Crotenay Combe d'Ain (9)
23.	AS Besançon Espérance (9)	0–8	ASM Belfort (5)
24.	US Saint-Vit (7)	2–1	Poligny-Grimont FC (7)
25.	Racing Besançon (5)	4–0	FC Grandvillars (6)
26.	US Franchevelle (9)	0–2	FC Villars-l'Isle-Saint-Maurice-Colombier-Blussans (7)
27.	AS Baume-les-Dames (7)	1–3	FC Bart (7)
28.	FC Seveux-Motey (10)	2–1	FC Seloncourt (8)
29.	AS Perrouse (8)	1–2	AS Audincourt (6)
30.	Besançon Football (5)	0–1	FC Morteau-Montlebon (6)
31.	FC Premier Plateau (11)	1–2	ÉS Doubs (8)
32.	US Pont-de-Roide-Vermondans (6)	5–1	JS Lure (7)
33.	Haute-Lizaine Pays d'Héricourt (8)	1–1 (4–1 p)	Bessoncourt Roppe Club Larivière (8)
34.	Olympique Courcelles-lès-Montbéliard (10)	2–1	ES Saugette Entre-Roches (9)

=== Fifth round ===
These matches were played on 11 and 12 October 2025.

Fifth Round Results: Bourgogne-Franche-Comté
Tie no	Home team (Tier)	Score	Away team (Tier)
1.	FC Gueugnon (6)	1–4	FC Montceau Bourgogne (6)
2.	US Cheminots Paray (7)	2–2 (1–4 p)	FC Chalon (5)
3.	AS Châtenoy-le-Royal (8)	0–7	Dijon FCO (3)
4.	Team Montceau Foot (8)	1–2	FC Sens (6)
5.	AS Quetigny (7)	2–2 (5–3 p)	Mâcon FC (8)
6.	FR Saint Marcel (6)	4–0	Digoin FCA (7)
7.	AS Garchizy (6)	1–0	ES Appoigny (7)
8.	Étoile Sud Nivernaise 58 (9)	1–6	Mâcon 71 (5)
9.	ALC Longvic (7)	0–2	ASPTT Dijon (5)
10.	FC Bart (7)	0–1	Is-Selongey Football (6)
11.	Olympique Courcelles-lès-Montbéliard (10)	0–2	Haute-Lizaine Pays d'Héricourt (8)
12.	AS Audincourt (6)	0–6	FC Sochaux Montbéliard (3)
13.	FC Villars-l'Isle-Saint-Maurice-Colombier-Blussans (7)	2–1	US Saint-Vit (7)
14.	ÉS Doubs (8)	1–2	US Pont-de-Roide-Vermondans (6)
15.	ASM Belfort (5)	1–0	FC Morteau-Montlebon (6)
16.	RC Lons-le-Saunier (7)	0–5	CA Pontarlier (5)
17.	Racing Besançon (5)	3–2	Jura Dolois Football (5)
18.	FC Seveux-Motey (10)	2–1	AS Beaune (7)

=== Sixth round ===
These matches were played on 25 and 26 October 2025.

Sixth Round Results: Bourgogne-Franche-Comté
Tie no	Home team (Tier)	Score	Away team (Tier)
1.	Haute-Lizaine Pays d'Héricourt (8)	0–4	Racing Besançon (5)
2.	FC Montceau Bourgogne (6)	3–0	FR Saint Marcel (6)
3.	Is-Selongey Football (6)	1–0	Dijon FCO (3)
4.	FC Seveux-Motey (10)	0–5	ASPTT Dijon (5)
5.	CA Pontarlier (5)	8–0	FC Sens (6)
6.	FC Villars-l'Isle-Saint-Maurice-Colombier-Blussans (7)	1–1 (9–8 p)	ASM Belfort (5)
7.	AS Quetigny (7)	3–0	AS Garchizy (6)
8.	US Pont-de-Roide-Vermondans (6)	0–3	FC Sochaux Montbéliard (3)
9.	FC Chalon (5)	2–2 (6–5 p)	Mâcon 71 (5)
