= 2021–22 Coupe de France preliminary rounds, Bourgogne-Franche-Comté =

The 2021–22 Coupe de France preliminary rounds, Bourgogne-Franche-Comté was the qualifying competition to decide which teams from the leagues of the Bourgogne-Franche-Comté region of France took part in the main competition from the seventh round.

A total of eight teams qualified from the Bourgogne-Franche-Comté preliminary rounds. In 2020–21, UF Mâconnais progressed furthest in the main competition, reaching the round of 64 before losing to FC Saint-Louis Neuweg.

== Draws and fixtures ==
On 8 July 2021, the league declared that 408 teams entered from the region, with 324 entering at the first round stage, 58 exempt to the second round (31 from Régionale 2 and all teams from Régionale 1). 12 Championnat National 3 teams entered at the third round stage, 3 Championnat National 2 teams at the fourth round stage and the remaining 8 clubs being part of the main draw.

The first round draw was published on 9 July 2021. The second round draw was published on 24 August 2021. The third round draw was published on 31 August 2021. The fourth round draw was published on 21 September 2021. The fifth round draw was made on 5 October 2021. The sixth round draw was made on 21 October 2021.

=== First round ===
These matches were played on 20, 21 and 22 August 2021.

First round results: Bourgogne-Franche-Comté
Tie no	Home team (tier)	Score	Away team (tier)
1.	AS Méziré-Fesches-le-Châtel (8)	4–2	FC Colombe (9)
2.	FC Pays de Luxeuil (11)	2–5	SG Héricourt (8)
3.	Rougemont Concorde (9)	1–1 (4–5 p)	FC Pays Minier (10)
4.	FC Giro-Lepuix (8)	4–0	Olympique Courcelles-lès-Montbéliard (9)
5.	AS Chèvremont (11)	3–4	AS Nord Territoire (9)
6.	AS Présentevillers-Sainte-Marie (10)	1–5	UOP Mathay (10)
7.	USC Sermamagny (10)	0–7	AS Mélisey-Saint Barthélemy (8)
8.	ES Exincourt-Taillecourt (9)	4–2	AS Rougegoutte (10)
9.	US Frotey-lès-Vesoul (9)	3–0 (Note: Tie won by means of forfeit.)	FC Forges Audincourt (10)
10.	US Pusey (10)	0–8	US Arcey (10)
11.	GLS Club 90 (11)	0–1	FC L'Isle-sur-le-Doubs (8)
12.	AS Fougerolles (9)	0–1	US Sous-Roches (8)
13.	AS Berche-Dampierre-Etouvans (12)	1–8	FC Seloncourt (10)
14.	Longevelle SC (9)	2–1	ASC Montbéliard (10)
15.	FAC Lougres (11)	2–3	SC Saint Loup-Corbenay-Magnoncourt (8)
16.	AS Sainte Suzanne (12)	1–3	ES Trévillers-Thiébouhans (11)
17.	ES Réchésy (11)	1–2	AS Guyans-Vennes (9)
18.	FC Suarce (12)	2–0	FC Plaimbois-du-Miroir (10
19.	US Roches-lès-Blamont (11)	1–2	SR Delle (8)
20.	AS Orchamps-Val de Vennes (8)	2–1	US Larians-et-Munans (7)
21.	CS Beaucourt (9)	0–3	AS Essert (10)
22.	ES Pays Maîchois (8)	2–0	ASFC Belfort (9)
23.	AS Feule-Solemont (11)	1–3	AS Courtefontaine-Les Plains (10)
24.	ES Charquemont (11)	0–1	AS Frambouhans (11)
25.	FC Le Russey (11)	1–1 (6–7 p)	US Les Fontenelles (10)
26.	SCM Valdoie (9)	3–0	AS Pierrefontaine et Laviron (10)
27.	US Saint Hippolyte (11)	3–2	US Les Fins (11)
28.	AS Danjoutin-Andelnans-Méroux (8)	2–0	AS Hérimoncourt (9)
29.	AS Dambelin (12)	2–1	FC Bourogne (12)
30.	FC Villars-sous-Écot/Saint-Maurice/Blussans (10)	4–3	RC Voujeaucourt (10)
31.	AS Montandon (12)	0–0 (4–2 p)	ASL Autechaux-Roide (9)
32.	US Les Quatre Monts (11)	2–1	ES Les Fonges 91 (9)
33.	AS Haut Lison (11)	2–1	ES Doubs (8)
34.	ASC Amathay-Longeville (12)	0–8	ES Les Sapins (10)
35.	RC Chaux-du-Dombief (10)	4–0	ES Sirod (9)
36.	AS Avoudrey (10)	1–1 (4–3 p)	Amancey-Bolandoz-Chantrans Foot (10)
37.	ES Saugette Entre-Roches (9)	4–0	AS Mont d'Usiers (10)
38.	ES Dannemarie (9)	2–1	AS Etalans Vernierfontaine (10)
39.	Arcade Foot (8)	0–2	CS Frasne (9)
40.	FC Massif Haut Doubs (11)	4–0	AS La Rochette (11)
41.	AS Fort-du-Plasne (10)	0–2	SC Villers-le-Lac (8)
42.	Entente Le Châteleu (10)	0–3	AS Château de Joux (9)
43.	US Laveron (11)	3–3 (4–2 p)	FC Liévremont-Arçon (9)
44.	Drugeon Sports (11)	4–0	Étoile Saugette La Chaux de Gilley (10)
45.	US Crotenay Combe d'Ain (10)	3–1	FC Haut Jura (8)
46.	FC Lac-Remoray-Vaux (10)	3–0	US Foncine (11)
47.	AS Genlis (8)	5–0	ALC Longvic (8)
48.	FR Archelange-Gredisans-Menotey (11)	0–6	CCS Val d'Amour Mont-sous-Vaudrey (7)
49.	CS Auxonnais (8)	2–1	EF Villages (8)
50.	US Trois Monts (9)	2–1	ISS Pleure (10)
51.	ASDDOM Dijon (11)	2–5	FC Saulon-Corcelles (9)
52.	FC Aiserey-Izeure (9)	0–0 (3–1 p)	AS Saint Usage Saint-Jean-de-Losne (8)
53.	FC Remilly (11)	8–1	AS Choisey (11)
54.	FC Neuilly-Crimolois Sennecey (10)	6–0	AS Montbarrey (11)
55.	FR Rahon (11)	0–5	Jura Stad' FC (8)
56.	AS Seurre (12)	0–10	FC Ouges-Fénay (9)
57.	AS Foucherans (9)	3–0	FC Plaine 39 (10)
58.	ESJA Myon-Chay Intercommunal (11)	1–2	ASC Velotte (10)
59.	AS Plateau de La Barêche (11)	4–0	FC Amagney Marchaux (11)
60.	US Avanne-Aveney (10)	0–3	FC Grand Besançon (8)
61.	FC Chatillon-Devecey (11)	0–4	FC Rochefort Athletic (8)
62.	ASC Besançon Mahoraise (10)	1–2	FC Montfaucon-Morre-Gennes-La Vèze (7)
63.	FC Brenne-Orain (10)	1–3	PS Dole-Crissey (9)
64.	US Prés de Vaux (11)	1–4	FC Val de Loue (9)
65.	AS Besançon Espérance (12)	0–3	Jura Nord Foot (10)
66.	Thise-Chalezeule FC (10)	3–0	US Grandmont (11)
67.	AS Besançon Ouest (12)	2–2 (4–3 p)	US Doubs Sud (10)
68.	FC Aiglepierre (9)	0–3	AS Sâone-Mamirolle (9)
69.	AS Beure (10)	3–2	FC Mouchard-Arc-et-Senans (10)
70.	FC Émagny Pin (10)	4–1	FC Premier Plateau (9)
71.	AS Poussots (11)	1–1 (5–6 p)	SC Jussey (9)
72.	CSL Chenôve (12)	0–3	FC Grésilles (10)
73.	Tilles FC (9)	5–1	FC Les 2 Vels (10)
74.	US Marey-Cussey (10)	4–2	US Brazey-en-Plaine (11)
75.	AS Dijon Toison d'Or (12)	1–8	ES Marnaysienne (9)
76.	FC Aignay Baigneux (11)	7–0	FFM La Romaine (11)
77.	FC Ahuy (11)	3–0	FC Sennecey-lès-Dijon (12)
78.	ASFC Daix (10)	0–3	FC Mirebellois-Pontailler-Lamarche (8)
79.	FC Jeunesse Mahoraise (11)	3–4	Espérance Arc-Gray (8)
80.	FC Vingeanne (9)	1–1 (1–3 p)	RC Saônois (9)
81.	Val de Norge FC (10)	5–0	Spartak Bressey (10)
82.	Dinamo Dijon (11)	0–6	ES Fauverney-Rouvres-Bretenière (7)
83.	Auxerre Sports Citoyens (11)	1–4	US Semur-Époisses (9)
84.	ASUC Migennes (8)	1–1 (4–1 p)	AS Gurgy (9)
85.	AS Saint-Bris-le-Vineux (9)	1–8	AS Magny (7)
86.	ES Héry (9)	2–0	UF Tonnerrois (10)
87.	FC Champs-sur-Yonne (9)	2–3	Montbard Venarey (9)
88.	AS Chablis (8)	2–1	Monéteau FC (9)
89.	AJ Sautourienne (10)	2–0	Entente Châtel-Gérard Nucerien (9)
90.	FC Saint Rémy les Montbard (9)	1–2	US Varennes (9)
91.	AS Précy (12)	0–18	Union Châtillonniase Colombine (10)
92.	SC Vitteaux (11)	0–3	FC Aigles Auxerre (12)
93.	AS Varzy (11)	0–6	US Toucycoise (9)
94.	US Joigny (10)	0–2	CA Saint-Georges (8)
95.	CSP Charmoy (12)	3–0	Cosnois FC (11)
96.	FC Coulanges-la-Vineuse (10)	0–3	US Dionysienne (10)
97.	FC Cheu	0–3	US Cerisiers (8)
98.	ASC Pougues (9)	3–2	FC Gatinais en Bourgogne (10)
99.	JS Saint-Révérien (11)	0–5	Jeunesse Sénonaise (10)
100.	USC Charny (12)	1–2	AS Montoise (9)
101.	AS Pouilly-sur-Loire (11)	0–1	FC Chevannes (9)
102.	Saint-Fargeau SF (10)	4–0	SC Gron Véron (10)
103.	FC Fleury-la-Vallée (10)	1–2	Amicale Franco-Portugais Sens (9)
104.	ES Saint-Germain-du-Plaine-Baudrières (10)	2–1	Entente Sud Revermont (8)
105.	FC Saint-Lupicin (12)	2–2 (4–1 p)	FC Charette (10)
106.	Olympique Montmorot (9)	0–8	RC Bresse Sud (8)
107.	US Revermontaise (10)	1–4	JS Simard (11)
108.	AS Tournus (12)	2–4	FC Petite Montagne (10)
109.	FC Courlaoux (12)	0–6	US Coteaux de Seille (8)
110.	FC Macornay Val de Sorne (10)	4–4 (2–4 p)	IS Bresse Nord (10)
111.	FC Pont de la Pyle (10)	1–1 (3–2 p)	AS Condal-Dommartin (11)
112.	AS Sornay (8)	4–3	SC Châteaurenaud (9)
113.	AS Vaux-lès-Saint-Claude (9)	5–2	AFC Cuiseaux-Champagnat (10)
114.	US Lessard-en-Bresse (9)	1–3	IS Saint-Usuge (9)
115.	ES Branges (10)	0–0 (3–5 p)	FC Épervans (10)
116.	AS Aromas (11)	1–1 (4–3 p)	CS Mervans (8)
117.	FC Hurigny (11)	1–3	Dun Sornin Chauffailles Brionnais (9)
118.	Sancé FC (10)	1–3	SR Clayettois (8)
119.	FC La Roche-Vineuse (9)	7–1	JS Mâconnaise (8)
120.	JS Crechoise (10)	3–1	FC Clessé
121.	FC Sennecé-lès-Mâcon (9)	0–3	US Sennecey-le-Grand et son Canton (8)
122.	FC Dompierre-Matour (10)	0–2	Joncy Salornay Val de Guye (10)
123.	AS Laizé (11)	0–7	Mâcon FC (8)
124.	CS Tramayes (11)	4–5	US Cluny (8)
125.	Viré Lugny Haut Mâconnais (11)	0–5	RC Flacé Mâcon (10)
126.	ES Pays Charollais (10)	0–4	Digoin FCA (9)
127.	Génelard Perrecy FC (9)	0–0 (2–4 p)	US Bourbon-Lancy FPT (10)
128.	US Rigny-sur-Arroux (9)	1–0	JF Palingeois (9)
129.	AS Neuvyssois (10)	1–0	AS Saint-Vincent-Bragny (9)
130.	AS Charrin (10)	1–3	Sud Foot 71 (8)
131.	AS Vendenesse-sur-Arroux (11)	1–3	ES Toulon-sur-Arroux (10)
132.	Entente Antully Saint-Émiland Auxy (11)	5–2	AS Ciry-le-Noble (9)
133.	UF La Machine (8)	5–0	AS Guerigny Urzy (8)
134.	FC Château-Chinon-Arleuf (10)	9–1	USC Franco-Portugais Garchizy (10)
135.	US Coulanges-lès-Nevers (9)	1–1 (5–6 p)	FC Nevers 58 (8)
136.	CS Corbigeois (9)	0–1	AS Fourchambault (9)
137.	Chaulgnes FC (9)	1–5	Étoile Sud Nivernaise 58 (8)
138.	RC Nevers-Challuy Sermoise (8)	0–1	FC Nevers Banlay (9)
139.	FREP Luthenay (10)	1–2	FC Sud Loire Allier 09 (9)
140.	RC Maupas (12)	0–1	JS Marzy (9)
141.	US Saint-Pierre Foot 58 (10)	3–0	US Luzy-Millay (10)
142.	CF Talant (12)	0–11	Chalon ACF (8)
143.	AS Lacanche (10)	3–0	FC Verdunois (11)
144.	JS Chagnotine (12)	0–3	AS Châtenoy-le-Royal (8)
145.	SLF Sevrey (11)	1–2	ÉFC Demigny (10)
146.	US Buxynoise (9)	3–2 (Note: Tie reversed from original draw.)	AS Varennes-le-Grand (10)
147.	US Meursault (8)	3–0	ASL Lux (9)
148.	JS Rully (9)	6–4	FC Autun (10)
149.	AS Cheminots Chagnotins (10)	1–3	ASC Plombières-Lès-Dijon (9)
150.	ASI Vougeot (11)	0–0 (5–6 p)	AS Pouilly-en-Auxois (8)
151.	FC Corgoloin-Ladoix (8)	3–5	AS Gevrey-Chambertin (9)
152.	Flamboyants Football Chalonnais (10)	0–3	Team Montceau Foot (9)
153.	US Savigny-Chassagne (10)	3–5	FC Marmagne (10)
154.	Montcenis FC (10)	4–1	CS Orion (11)
155.	Saint-Vallier Sport (10)	4–2	SC Etangois (10)
156.	Sassenay-Virey-Lessard-Fragnes (9)	1–5	FC Sombernon-Gissey (10)
157.	US Givry-Saint-Désert (10)	1–1 (3–4 p)	UFC de l'Ouche (11)
158.	AS Canton du Bligny-sur-Ouche (12)	1–5	AS Mellecey-Mercurey (10)
159.	FC Saint-Rémy (9)	3–1	FLL Gergy-Verjux (9)
160.	EJS Épinacoise (10)	3–3 (9–8 p)	FC Bois du Verne (11)
161.	FR Saint Marcel (7)	8–0	US Nolay (11)
162.	US Blanzy (9)	2–2 (4–5 p)	US Crissotine (9)

=== Second round ===
These matches were played on 28 and 29 August 2021.

Second round results: Bourgogne-Franche-Comté
Tie no	Home team (tier)	Score	Away team (tier)
1.	FC Seloncourt (10)	3–2	US Saint Hippolyte (11)
2.	FC Giro-Lepuix (8)	1–1 (3–5 p)	AS Orchamps-Val de Vennes (8)
3.	ES Trévillers-Thiébouhans (11)	0–9	FC L'Isle-sur-le-Doubs (8)
4.	Haute-Lizaine Pays d'Héricourt (7)	3–3 (3–4 p)	US Châtenois-les-Forges (7)
5.	AS Bavilliers (7)	4–0	US Sous-Roches (8)
6.	ES Exincourt-Taillecourt (9)	0–4	FC Vesoul (6)
7.	UOP Mathay (10)	1–0	Longevelle SC (9)
8.	FC Pays Minier (10)	2–1	AS Guyans-Vennes (9)
9.	AS Montandon (12)	0–5	AS Méziré-Fesches-le-Châtel (8)
10.	FC Villars-sous-Écot/Saint-Maurice/Blussans (10)	0–3	JS Lure (7)
11.	AS Dambelin (12)	1–3	US Les Écorces (7)
12.	AS Danjoutin-Andelnans-Méroux (8)	1–2	US Frotey-lès-Vesoul (9)
13.	US Arcey (10)	5–2	Bessoncourt Roppe Club Larivière (7)
14.	US Les Fontenelles (10)	1–2	SR Delle (8)
15.	AS Essert (10)	1–3	SG Héricourt (8)
16.	SC Saint Loup-Corbenay-Magnoncourt (8)	0–6	AS Belfort Sud (6)
17.	SCM Valdoie (9)	2–2 (5–4 p)	AS Courtefontaine-Les Plains (10)
18.	US Sochaux (7)	3–3 (2–4 p)	US Pont-de-Roide (6)
19.	AS Mélisey-Saint Barthélemy (8)	0–3	AS Audincourt (6)
20.	AS Nord Territoire (9)	0–5	FC Noidanais (7)
21.	FC Suarce (12)	1–3	FC Bart (7)
22.	AS Frambouhans (11)	0–9	ES Pays Maîchois (8)
23.	AS Haut Lison (11)	0–0 (4–5 p)	ES Dannemarie (9)
24.	AS Château de Joux (9)	0–1	AS Levier (6)
25.	US Crotenay Combe d'Ain (10)	1–2	AS Avoudrey (10)
26.	ES Les Sapins (10)	1–3	Drugeon Sports (11)
27.	US Les Quatre Monts (11)	2–2 (6–5 p)	SC Villers-le-Lac (8)
28.	FC Massif Haut Doubs (11)	0–8	AS Baume-les-Dames (6)
29.	US Laveron (11)	2–2 (2–4 p)	RC Chaux-du-Dombief (10)
30.	FC Lac-Remoray-Vaux (10)	1–2	FC Champagnole (6)
31.	CS Frasne (9)	0–3	AS Ornans (6)
32.	ES Saugette Entre-Roches (9)	1–1 (3–4 p)	FCC La Joux (7)
33.	ASC Velotte (10)	1–1 (4–1 p)	FC Émagny Pin (10)
34.	FC Saulon-Corcelles (9)	0–1	Thise-Chalezeule FC (10)
35.	FC Grand Besançon (8)	1–4	US Saint-Vit (6)
36.	Jura Nord Foot (10)	1–4	Fontaine-lès-Dijon FC (7)
37.	AS Beure (10)	0–3	AS Perrouse (7)
38.	US Marey-Cussey (10)	0–3	US Rioz-Étuz-Cussey (7)
39.	AS Sâone-Mamirolle (9)	1–3	FC Montfaucon-Morre-Gennes-La Vèze (7)
40.	ES Marnaysienne (9)	1–3	Entente Roche-Novillars (6)
41.	AS Besançon Ouest (12)	0–10	Poligny-Grimont FC (7)
42.	FC Grésilles (10)	1–4	ES Fauverney-Rouvres-Bretenière (7)
43.	FC Aignay Baigneux (11)	2–3	AS Genlis (8)
44.	Espérance Arc-Gray (8)	0–3	PS Dole-Crissey (9)
45.	AS Plateau de La Barêche (11)	1–3	SC Jussey (9)
46.	FC Remilly (11)	0–2	FC 4 Rivières 70 (6)
47.	FC Mirebellois-Pontailler-Lamarche (8)	1–2	FC Rochefort Athletic (8)
48.	CS Auxonnais (8)	1–1 (4–5 p)	Tilles FC (9)
49.	FC Ouges-Fénay (9)	2–0	FC Aiserey-Izeure (9)
50.	RC Saônois (9)	2–1	FC Val de Loue (9)
51.	FC Neuilly-Crimolois Sennecey (10)	4–1	Val de Norge FC (10)
52.	FC Ahuy (11)	0–8	AEP Pouilley-les-Vignes (7)
53.	AS Chablis (8)	2–1	US Varennes (9)
54.	FC Chevannes (9)	0–3	AS Magny (7)
55.	US Toucycoise (9)	1–0	CA Saint-Georges (8)
56.	Amicale Franco-Portugais Sens (9)	0–3	Stade Auxerrois (6)
57.	Union Châtillonniase Colombine (10)	5–0	ES Héry (9)
58.	Jeunesse Sénonaise (10)	4–4 (2–4 p)	US Dionysienne (10)
59.	ASC Pougues (9)	3–3 (6–5 p)	Saint-Fargeau SF (10)
60.	Montbard Venarey (9)	2–3	ES Appoigny (7)
61.	AS Montoise (9)	0–3	ASUC Migennes (8)
62.	US Cerisiers (8)	1–1 (7–6 p)	AS Clamecy (7)
63.	CSP Charmoy (12)	1–7	FC Sens (6)
64.	Union Cosnoise Sportive (6)	4–0	Avallon FCO (6)
65.	FC Aigles Auxerre (12)	0–2	AJ Sautourienne (10)
66.	US Semur-Époisses (9)	2–2 (3–2 p)	US Cheminots Dijonnais (7)
67.	FC Pont de la Pyle (10)	2–4	AS Aromas (11)
68.	FC Saint-Lupicin (12)	2–1	FC Épervans (10)
69.	FC Petite Montagne (10)	0–7	Bresse Jura Foot (7)
70.	AS Vaux-lès-Saint-Claude (9)	3–2	ES Saint-Germain-du-Plaine-Baudrières (10)
71.	RC Bresse Sud (8)	5–1	AS Sagy (8)
72.	US Coteaux de Seille (8)	2–1	US Trois Monts (9)
73.	IS Bresse Nord (10)	2–4	Jura Stad' FC (8)
74.	AS Foucherans (9)	1–5	Jura Lacs Foot (6)
75.	JS Simard (11)	0–3	IS Saint-Usuge (9)
76.	CCS Val d'Amour Mont-sous-Vaudrey (7)	2–2 (4–3 p)	AS Sornay (8)
77.	RC Lons-le-Saunier (6)	7–0	Triangle d'Or Jura Foot (7)
78.	FC Nevers 58 (8)	0–2	US Saint-Sernin-du-Bois (6)
79.	US Bourbon-Lancy FPT (10)	0–4	UF La Machine (8)
80.	JS Marzy (9)	0–4	US Rigny-sur-Arroux (9)
81.	AS Neuvyssois (10)	2–1	Sud Foot 71 (8)
82.	US Cheminots Paray (6)	0–1	US La Charité (6)
83.	ES Toulon-sur-Arroux (10)	0–8	ASA Vauzelles (7)
84.	AS Saint-Benin (7)	0–1	AS Garchizy (6)
85.	Entente Antully Saint-Émiland Auxy (11)	0–5	Digoin FCA (9)
86.	AS Fourchambault (9)	3–1	US Saint-Pierre Foot 58 (10)
87.	CS Sanvignes (7)	1–2	Sud Nivernais Imphy Decize (6)
88.	FC Sud Loire Allier 09 (9)	0–3	FC Nevers Banlay (9)
89.	FC Château-Chinon-Arleuf (10)	2–2 (2–3 p)	Étoile Sud Nivernaise 58 (8)
90.	RC Flacé Mâcon (10)	0–1	FC La Roche-Vineuse (9)
91.	Joncy Salornay Val de Guye (10)	0–7	UF Mâconnais (6)
92.	Dun Sornin Chauffailles Brionnais (9)	0–0 (4–3 p)	AS Chapelloise (6)
93.	SR Clayettois (8)	2–4	JS Montchanin ODRA (7)
94.	US Cluny (7)	5–2	US Saint-Bonnet/La Guiche (7)
95.	Mâcon FC (8)	2–2 (3–1 p)	US Sennecey-le-Grand et son Canton (8)
96.	JS Crechoise (10)	0–2	AS Beaune (7)
97.	US Meursault (8)	6–3 (Note: Tie reversed from original draw.)	Chalon ACF (8)
98.	AS Pouilly-en-Auxois (8)	3–1	CL Marsannay-la-Côte (7)
99.	FC Marmagne (10)	1–3	JO Le Creusot (7)
100.	AS Lacanche (10)	0–9	FC Chalon (6)
101.	FC Saint-Rémy (9)	4–1	US Buxynoise (9)
102.	JS Rully (9)	1–2	FR Saint Marcel (7)
103.	ASPTT Dijon (7)	2–0	ESA Breuil (7)
104.	Team Montceau Foot (9)	5–2	FC Sombernon-Gissey (10)
105.	UFC de l'Ouche (11)	0–3	Montcenis FC (10)
106.	ASC Plombières-Lès-Dijon (9)	0–0 (4–3 p)	Chevigny Saint-Sauveur (6)
107.	AS Gevrey-Chambertin (9)	3–1	Saint-Vallier Sport (10)
108.	ÉFC Demigny (10)	2–3	EJS Épinacoise (10)
109.	US Crissotine (9)	1–1 (3–4 p)	AS Châtenoy-le-Royal (8)
110.	AS Mellecey-Mercurey (10)	2–7	AS Quetigny (6)

=== Third round ===
These matches were played on 18 and 19 September 2021.

Third round results: Bourgogne-Franche-Comté
Tie no	Home team (tier)	Score	Away team (tier)
1.	RC Chaux-du-Dombief (10)	1–2	FC Noidanais (7)
2.	FC Seloncourt (10)	0–6	FC L'Isle-sur-le-Doubs (8)
3.	ES Dannemarie (9)	0–11	FC Morteau-Montlebon (5)
4.	AS Ornans (6)	4–0	FC Bart (7)
5.	FC Vesoul (6)	0–1	CA Pontarlier (5)
6.	US Arcey (10)	2–4	AS Levier (6)
7.	AS Avoudrey (10)	0–2	AS Belfort Sud (6)
8.	US Frotey-lès-Vesoul (9)	2–4	AS Méziré-Fesches-le-Châtel (8)
9.	ES Pays Maîchois (8)	1–0	AS Baume-les-Dames (6)
10.	Drugeon Sports (11)	1–2	SG Héricourt (8)
11.	FC Pays Minier (10)	0–2	FC Valdahon-Vercel (5)
12.	US Les Quatre Monts (11)	0–3	US Pont-de-Roide (6)
13.	JS Lure (7)	1–1 (4–2 p)	AS Orchamps-Val de Vennes (8)
14.	AS Audincourt (6)	3–3 (3–1 p)	AS Bavilliers (7)
15.	SCM Valdoie (9)	1–1 (2–4 p)	FCC La Joux (7)
16.	SR Delle (8)	0–2	US Les Écorces (7)
17.	UOP Mathay (10)	2–2 (4–5 p)	US Châtenois-les-Forges (7)
18.	FC Ouges-Fénay (9)	1–4	FC Grandvillars (5)
19.	Jura Stad' FC (8)	0–1	Tilles FC (9)
20.	AS Genlis (8)	1–3	RC Bresse Sud (8)
21.	AS Perrouse (7)	0–10	Racing Besançon (5)
22.	SC Jussey (9)	0–1	Poligny-Grimont FC (7)
23.	US Rioz-Étuz-Cussey (7)	1–1 (6–7 p)	FC Champagnole (6)
24.	Bresse Jura Foot (7)	3–2	AEP Pouilley-les-Vignes (7)
25.	Thise-Chalezeule FC (10)	0–3	Entente Roche-Novillars (6)
26.	FC Saint-Lupicin (12)	0–8	RC Lons-le-Saunier (6)
27.	CCS Val d'Amour Mont-sous-Vaudrey (7)	3–1 (Note: Tie reversed from original draw.)	FC Rochefort Athletic (8)
28.	RC Saônois (9)	0–1	FC 4 Rivières 70 (6)
29.	FC Neuilly-Crimolois Sennecey (10)	1–3	ES Fauverney-Rouvres-Bretenière (7)
30.	ASC Velotte (10)	1–4	FC Montfaucon-Morre-Gennes-La Vèze (7)
31.	PS Dole-Crissey (9)	0–3	US Saint-Vit (6)
32.	IS Saint-Usuge (9)	0–8	Besançon Football (5)
33.	US Coteaux de Seille (8)	8–0	AS Vaux-lès-Saint-Claude (9)
34.	AS Aromas (11)	1–8	Jura Lacs Foot (6)
35.	AS Garchizy (6)	1–1 (5–6 p)	ASA Vauzelles (7)
36.	ASUC Migennes (8)	0–4	Stade Auxerrois (6)
37.	Étoile Sud Nivernaise 58 (8)	1–1 (5–6 p)	US Toucycoise (9)
38.	US Semur-Époisses (9)	0–4	Paron FC (5)
39.	AJ Sautourienne (10)	0–4	FC Sens (6)
40.	ASC Pougues (9)	0–2	Union Châtillonniase Colombine (10)
41.	UF La Machine (8)	1–1 (5–4 p)	FC Nevers Banlay (9)
42.	ES Appoigny (7)	1–0	FC Montceau Bourgogne (5)
43.	US Cerisiers (8)	0–0 (10–9 p)	FC Gueugnon (5)
44.	AS Fourchambault (9)	1–1 (3–4 p)	US La Charité (6)
45.	US Dionysienne (10)	0–0 (4–2 p)	Fontaine-lès-Dijon FC (7)
46.	AS Magny (7)	2–4	Union Cosnoise Sportive (6)
47.	AS Chablis (8)	0–2	Sud Nivernais Imphy Decize (6)
48.	AS Neuvyssois (10)	3–0	FC Saint-Rémy (9)
49.	Dun Sornin Chauffailles Brionnais (9)	1–1 (8–7 p)	US Cluny (7)
50.	ASC Plombières-Lès-Dijon (9)	3–1	AS Pouilly-en-Auxois (8)
51.	Montcenis FC (10)	2–5	Mâcon FC (8)
52.	AS Gevrey-Chambertin (9)	0–2	Is-Selongey Football (5)
53.	FC La Roche-Vineuse (9)	2–3	Team Montceau Foot (9)
54.	AS Beaune (7)	1–2	FC Chalon (6)
55.	US Meursault (8)	0–5	AS Quetigny (6)
56.	UF Mâconnais (6)	7–0	JO Le Creusot (7)
57.	ASPTT Dijon (7)	0–2	Jura Dolois Football (5)
58.	US Rigny-sur-Arroux (9)	1–0	JS Montchanin ODRA (7)
59.	EJS Épinacoise (10)	0–8	ASC Saint-Apollinaire (5)
60.	AS Châtenoy-le-Royal (8)	3–1	Digoin FCA (9)
61.	US Saint-Sernin-du-Bois (6)	0–1	FR Saint Marcel (7)

=== Fourth round ===
These matches were played on 2 and 3 October 2021.

Fourth round results: Bourgogne-Franche-Comté
Tie no	Home team (tier)	Score	Away team (tier)
1.	Union Châtillonniase Colombine (10)	1–1 (2–4 p)	UF La Machine (8)
2.	US Dionysienne (10)	2–1	Mâcon FC (8)
3.	Stade Auxerrois (6)	0–3	Louhans-Cuiseaux FC (4)
4.	ASA Vauzelles (7)	1–3	Union Cosnoise Sportive (6)
5.	AS Neuvyssois (10)	1–3	Paron FC (5)
6.	Sud Nivernais Imphy Decize (6)	0–4	Is-Selongey Football (5)
7.	FR Saint Marcel (7)	3–0	US Cerisiers (8)
8.	FC Chalon (6)	2–0	ES Appoigny (7)
9.	US Toucycoise (9)	1–5	US La Charité (6)
10.	FC Sens (6)	0–6	UF Mâconnais (6)
11.	Dun Sornin Chauffailles Brionnais (9)	0–1	ASC Saint-Apollinaire (5)
12.	Racing Besançon (5)	2–4	Jura Sud Foot (4)
13.	ES Fauverney-Rouvres-Bretenière (7)	2–2 (4–2 p)	FC 4 Rivières 70 (6)
14.	ASC Plombières-Lès-Dijon (9)	2–3	Jura Lacs Foot' (6)
15.	US Saint-Vit (6)	0–3	Jura Dolois Football (5)
16.	Tilles FC (9)	1–0	CCS Val d'Amour Mont-sous-Vaudrey (7)
17.	Team Montceau Foot (9)	0–3	Bresse Jura Foot (7)
18.	Entente Roche-Novillars (6)	3–1	Poligny-Grimont FC (7)
19.	RC Lons-le-Saunier (6)	1–1 (4–3 p)	Besançon Football (5)
20.	RC Bresse Sud (8)	0–2	AS Quetigny (6)
21.	US Coteaux de Seille (8)	0–2	AS Châtenoy-le-Royal (8)
22.	US Rigny-sur-Arroux (9)	0–4	FC Champagnole (6)
23.	FC Montfaucon-Morre-Gennes-La Vèze (7)	1–4	AS Audincourt (6)
24.	FC Morteau-Montlebon (5)	2–0	FC Valdahon-Vercel (5)
25.	US Châtenois-les-Forges (7)	2–2 (4–5 p)	US Les Écorces (7)
26.	JS Lure (7)	0–0 (3–4 p)	ASM Belfort (4)
27.	SG Héricourt (8)	0–5	FCC La Joux (7)
28.	FC Noidanais (7)	1–2	FC Grandvillars (5)
29.	US Pont-de-Roide (6)	4–0	AS Ornans (6)
30.	CA Pontarlier (5)	2–0	AS Belfort Sud (6)
31.	FC L'Isle-sur-le-Doubs (8)	1–3	AS Levier (6)
32.	AS Méziré-Fesches-le-Châtel (8)	0–0 (2–4 p)	ES Pays Maîchois (8)

=== Fifth round ===
These matches were played on 16 and 17 October 2021.

Fifth round results: Bourgogne-Franche-Comté
Tie no	Home team (tier)	Score	Away team (tier)
1.	US Pont-de-Roide (6)	1–1 (5–6 p)	Entente Roche-Novillars (6)
2.	Tilles FC (9)	1–2	AS Levier (6)
3.	FC Morteau-Montlebon (5)	3–1	CA Pontarlier (5)
4.	Jura Lacs Foot (6)	0–0 (4–3 p)	ASM Belfort (4)
5.	Bresse Jura Foot (7)	3–0	US Les Écorces (7)
6.	AS Audincourt (6)	1–5	Jura Sud Foot (4)
7.	FCC La Joux (7)	1–1 (2–4 p)	FC Champagnole (6)
8.	ES Pays Maîchois (8)	0–2	FC Grandvillars (5)
9.	Is-Selongey Football (5)	0–0 (1–3 p)	ASC Saint-Apollinaire (5)
10.	Union Cosnoise Sportive (6)	3–2	UF Mâconnais (6)
11.	AS Châtenoy-le-Royal (8)	1–1 (2–4 p)	FR Saint Marcel (7)
12.	AS Quetigny (6)	2–2 (2–4 p)	RC Lons-le-Saunier (6)
13.	Louhans-Cuiseaux FC (4)	5–2	Paron FC (5)
14.	UF La Machine (8)	1–2	US La Charité (6)
15.	US Dionysienne (10)	0–7	Jura Dolois Football (5)
16.	FC Chalon (6)	1–2	ES Fauverney-Rouvres-Bretenière (7)

=== Sixth round ===
These matches were played on 30 and 31 October 2021.

Sixth round results: Bourgogne-Franche-Comté
Tie no	Home team (tier)	Score	Away team (tier)
1.	Jura Sud Foot (4)	1–0	FC Grandvillars (5)
2.	FC Champagnole (6)	2–4	FC Morteau-Montlebon (5)
3.	ES Fauverney-Rouvres-Bretenière (7)	0–1	Jura Dolois Football (5)
4.	FR Saint Marcel (7)	1–1 (10–9 p)	Louhans-Cuiseaux FC (4)
5.	ASC Saint-Apollinaire (5)	2–1	US La Charité (6)
6.	Jura Lacs Foot (6)	1–2	Bresse Jura Foot (7)
7.	AS Levier (6)	1–5	Union Cosnoise Sportive (6)
8.	Entente Roche-Novillars (6)	1–2	RC Lons-le-Saunier (6)
