= 2022–23 Coupe de France preliminary rounds, Bourgogne-Franche-Comté =

The 2022–23 Coupe de France preliminary rounds, Bourgogne-Franche-Comté is the qualifying competition to decide which teams from the leagues of the Bourgogne-Franche-Comté region of France take part in the main competition from the seventh round.

A total of eight teams will qualify from the Bourgogne-Franche-Comté preliminary rounds.

In 2021–22, Jura Sud Foot progressed the furthest in the competition, reaching the round of 32, where they were beaten by AS Saint-Étienne in a game marred by crowd trouble.

== Draws and fixtures ==
On 13 July 2022, the league announced that 401 teams had entered from the region. On the same day the first round draw was published, with 332 teams from Régional 2 and below involved in 166 ties, and 23 teams from Régional 2 and Régional 3 exempted.

The second round draw was published on 23 August 2022, with 108 ties and 50 new entrants comprising the exempted first round teams and the teams from Régional 1. The third round draw, including the 12 teams from Championnat National 3, was published on 30 August 2022.

The fourth round draw was published on 13 September 2022, with four teams from Championnat National 2 entering at this stage.

The fifth and sixth round draws were published on 27 September 2022.

=== First round ===
These matches were played on 20 and 21 August 2022.

First round results: Bourgogne-Franche-Comté
Tie no	Home team (tier)	Score	Away team (tier)
1.	FC Clerval Anteuil (11)	3–3 (5–6 p)	UOP Mathay (10)
2.	AS Hérimoncourt (9)	4–1 (Note: Tie reversed from original draw.)	US Sous-Roches (9)
3.	US Châtenois-les-Forges (7)	0–4	FC Bart (7)
4.	AS Avoudrey (10)	2–2 (10–9 p)	FC L'Isle-sur-le-Doubs (7)
5.	SC Saint Loup-Corbenay-Magnoncourt (8)	2–1	FC Colombe (9)
6.	AS Fougerolles (10)	4–3	US Frotey-lès-Vesoul (9)
7.	FC Pays de Luxeuil (10)	2–3	ASFC Belfort (8)
8.	US Arcey (9)	4–0	ASL Autechaux-Roide (10)
9.	AS Guyans-Vennes (10)	2–1	RC Voujeaucourt (10)
10.	SR Villars-sous-Dampjoux (11)	1–0	US Roches-lès-Blamont (11)
11.	AS Dambelin (12)	0–5	FC Le Russey (10)
12.	FC Seloncourt (10)	2–0	AS Chèvremont (11)
13.	US Abbévillers-Vandoncourt (11)	1–5	ASC Montbéliard (9)
14.	US Les Fontenelles (10)	0–1	AS Essert (10)
15.	US Bavans (11)	0–3	AS Pierrefontaine et Laviron (11)
16.	AS Rougegoutte (10)	3–1	Vesoul RC (10)
17.	AO Vesoul (10)	1–5	AS Méziré-Fesches-le-Châtel (8)
18.	AS Mélisey-Saint Barthélemy (8)	9–0	FC Giro-Lepuix (8)
19.	AS Présentevillers-Sainte-Marie (10)	1–4	FC 3 Cantons (10)
20.	Bessoncourt Roppe Club Larivière (8)	1–2	SG Héricourt (8)
21.	FC Plaimbois-du-Miroir (10)	1–3	FC Villars-sous-Écot/Saint-Maurice/Blussans (10)
22.	FC Bourogne (12)	0–3 (Note: Tie won by means of forfeit.)	Rougemont Concorde (9)
23.	SCM Valdoie (8)	1–0	FC Pays Minier (9)
24.	GLS Club 90 (11)	0–7	AS Nord Territoire (9)
25.	AS Courtefontaine-Les Plains (10)	2–2 (6–5 p)	ES Exincourt-Taillecourt (9)
26.	AS Feule-Solemont (11)	0–3	FC Suarce (11)
27.	US Les Écorces (8)	2–1	AS Danjoutin-Andelnans-Méroux (8)
28.	AS Orchamps-Val de Vennes (8)	3–0	US Saint Hippolyte (10)
29.	SR Delle (8)	5–0	ES Trévillers-Thiébouhans (10)
30.	Olympique Courcelles-lès-Montbéliard (10)	5–0	AS Sainte Suzanne (12)
31.	Haute-Lizaine Pays d'Héricourt (7)	1–4	AS Bavilliers (7)
32.	Entente Le Châteleu (10)	0–3	CS Frasne (8)
33.	US Prés de Vaux (10)	2–3	FC Haut Jura (9)
34.	US Les Fins (10)	2–2 (4–5 p)	FC Lac-Remoray-Vaux (10)
35.	Entente Focine Fort-du-Plasne (11)	1–1 (3–5 p)	FC Liévremont-Arçon (9)
36.	US Laveron (11)	1–5	ES Doubs (8)
37.	AS Mont d'Usiers (10)	6–1	ASC Amathay-Longeville (12)
38.	ES Charquemont (11)	2–0	ES Dannemarie (10)
39.	AS Besançon Ouest (11)	1–6	ES Les Fonges 91 (9)
40.	AS Etalans Vernierfontaine (10)	7–0	Drugeon Sports (10)
41.	AS Haut Lison (11)	0–2	US Les Quatre Monts (11)
42.	ES Les Sapins (10)	3–2	ES Saugette Entre-Roches (9)
43.	Étoile Saugette La Chaux de Gilley (10)	2–6	FC Massif Haut Doubs (11)
44.	ES Sirod (9)	0–3	Grandvaux Foot (10)
45.	US Crotenay Combe d'Ain (10)	0–0 (3–4 p)	Amancey-Bolandoz-Chantrans Foot (10)
46.	AS Montandon (11)	0–0 (2–4 p)	FC Chatillon-Devecey (11)
47.	FC Gevry (10)	1–1 (3–5 p)	AS Plateau de La Barêche (10)
48.	SC Besançon (12)	6–1	FC Émagny Pin (11)
49.	Spartak Bressey (11)	0–2	AF Audeux/Pelousey/Pouilley-les-Vignes (7)
50.	FC Premier Plateau (10)	2–1	FC Mouchard-Arc-et-Senans (10)
51.	FC Monts de Gy (10)	2–2 (3–5 p)	ESJA Myon-Chay Intercommunal (11)
52.	ASC Besançon Mahoraise (9)	1–0	AS Sâone-Mamirolle (9)
53.	AS Foucherans (10)	0–2	FC Grand Besançon (9)
54.	FC Aiserey-Izeure (10)	4–0	Afrique Foot Dijonnais (11)
55.	FC Aiglepierre (10)	4–2	Dinamo Dijon (11)
56.	FC Ouges-Fénay (9)	0–0 (1–3 p)	FC Plaine 39 (10)
57.	US Doubs Sud (10)	2–2 (6–5 p)	Triangle d'Or Jura Foot (8)
58.	ALC Longvic (8)	1–0	Tilles FC (9)
59.	ASC Velotte (10)	1–1 (3–4 p)	Val de Norge FC (10)
60.	AS Poussots (12)	0–3	ISS Pleure (10)
61.	FC Neuilly-Crimolois Sennecey (10)	4–1	Espérance Arc-Gray (8)
62.	FC Tillenay (11)	0–3	AS Perrouse (7)
63.	US Val de Pesmes (9)	1–5	US Rioz-Étuz-Cussey (7)
64.	SC Clémenceau Besançon (11)	2–3	AS Genlis (9)
65.	FC Mirebellois-Pontailler-Lamarche (9)	2–4	FC Rochefort Athletic (9)
66.	FEP Autrey-lès-Gray (10)	3–1	Esperance Auxons-Miserey (11)
67.	FC Amagney Marchaux (11)	0–7	RC Saônois (8)
68.	AS Montbarrey (11)	5–0	SC Jussey (10)
69.	AS Beure (11)	1–2	FC Aignay Baigneux (10)
70.	FC Remilly (11)	5–0	CS Auxonnais (9)
71.	FC Saulon-Corcelles (10)	1–0	PS Dole-Crissey (9)
72.	US Marey-Cussey (11)	1–5	ES Marnaysienne (8)
73.	FR Rahon (11)	4–8	FC Les 2 Vels (10)
74.	FC Brenne-Orain (10)	3–2	US Avanne-Aveney (11)
75.	FC Vingeanne (10)	1–1 (1–4 p)	Jura Nord Foot (9)
76.	Jura Stad' FC (9)	1–2	Thise-Chalezeule FC (10)
77.	FC Val de Loue (9)	1–2	Entente Roche-Novillars (7)
78.	Olympique Chaignay (12)	3–3 (4–3 p)	ASFC Daix (10)
79.	ES Héry (9)	1–7	AS Magny (7)
80.	UF Villeneuvienne (12)	0–0 (5–6 p)	ACB Soucy-Thorigny (11)
81.	US Dionysienne (10)	1–5	US Cerisiers (8)
82.	AS Varzy (11)	1–7	US Toucycoise (8)
83.	FC Quarré Saint-Germain (11)	2–0	FC Champs-sur-Yonne (9)
84.	Montbard Venarey (9)	5–2	AS Clamecy (8)
85.	Entente Châtel-Gérard Nucerien (9)	1–4	US Varennes (9)
86.	FC Coulanges-la-Vineuse (10)	3–1	FC Gatinais en Bourgogne (10)
87.	FC Sombernon-Gissey (10)	0–2	Amicale Franco-Portugais Sens (8)
88.	Cosnois FC (10)	1–3	AS Chablis (8)
89.	CA Saint-Georges (8)	2–2 (5–6 p)	FC Saint-Rémy-les-Montbard (8)
90.	UF Tonnerrois (10)	1–1 (5–4 p)	Auxerre Sports Citoyens (10)
91.	AJ Sautourienne (9)	1–3	ASUC Migennes (8)
92.	AS Montoise (9)	3–3 (3–5 p)	Union Châtillonniase Colombine (9)
93.	US Semur-Époisses (10)	3–2	US Joigny (9)
94.	FC Fleury-la-Vallée (10)	0–3	SC Gron Véron (10)
95.	CSP Charmoy (11)	4–1	ES Vinneuf Courlon (10)
96.	SC Vittelien (11)	0–6	AS Gurgy (9)
97.	ASC Pougues (9)	0–1	ES Appoigny (7)
98.	AS Pouilly-sur-Loire (10)	0–0 (4–2 p)	Saint-Fargeau SF (10)
99.	AS Aromas (11)	3–1	AS Tournus (11)
100.	GC Beaufort (11)	3–0	JS Ouroux-sur-Saône (11)
101.	FR Archelange-Gredisans-Menotey (11)	2–0	FC Arlay (12)
102.	IS Saint-Usuge (10)	0–5	AS Sagy (8)
103.	AS Condal-Dommartin (11)	1–3	ES Montponnaise (12)
104.	ES Saint-Germain-du-Plaine-Baudrières (10)	3–1	FC Courlaoux (11)
105.	JS Simard (11)	3–4	FC Épervans (9)
106.	US Lessard-en-Bresse (9)	1–3	AS Vaux-lès-Saint-Claude (10)
107.	US Trois Monts (9)	1–2	SC Châteaurenaud (8)
108.	FC Petite Montagne (10)	3–3 (4–5 p)	Olympique Montmorot (9)
109.	IS Bresse Nord (10)	1–3	CS Mervans (8)
110.	AS Sornay (8)	2–1	RC Bresse Sud (8)
111.	US Saint-Germain-du-Bois (11)	1–5	AFC Cuiseaux-Champagnat (10)
112.	Entente Sud Revermont (9)	3–3 (3–4 p)	FC Macornay Val de Sorne (9)
113.	US Saint-Pierre Foot 58 (10)	1–5	ASA Vauzelles (7)
114.	Persévérante Pontoise (10)	0–3	Aillant SF (10)
115.	AS Guerigny Urzy (9)	0–6	US Coulanges-lès-Nevers (9)
116.	US Charolles (10)	3–0	ALSC Montigny-aux-Amognes (10)
117.	AS Cossaye (11)	4–3	AS Courson (10)
118.	FREP Luthenay (10)	1–5	ÉFC Demigny (10)
119.	SC Sénonais (12)	0–3	Sud Nivernais Imphy Decize (7)
120.	CS Corbigeois (10)	3–0	FC Hurigny (11)
121.	AS Ciry-le-Noble (10)	3–1	AS Charrin (10)
122.	AS Saint-Vincent-Bragny (9)	1–1 (4–1 p) (Note: AS Saint-Vincent-Bragny penalised for fielding two ineligible players. RC Nevers-Challuy-Sermoise qualify.)	RC Nevers-Challuy Sermoise (8)
123.	FC Autun (10)	2–1	ES Toulon-sur-Arroux (10)
124.	FC Sud Loire Allier 09 (9)	0–3	US Cercycoise (10)
125.	ES Pouilloux (10)	0–3	UF La Machine (8)
126.	JF Palingeois (9)	0–0 (2–3 p)	FC Nevers Banlay (8)
127.	Digoin FCA (9)	1–2	AS Fourchambault (8)
128.	Sud Foot 71 (8)	3–0	AS Neuvyssois (9)
129.	FC Château-Chinon-Arleuf (10)	1–6	FC Clessé (10)
130.	Génelard Perrecy FC (9)	0–3	Étoile Sud Nivernaise 58 (8)
131.	US Revermontaise (10)	5–3	AS Varennes-le-Grand (10)
132.	US Bourbon-Lancy FPT (10)	2–4	US Rigny-sur-Arroux (9)
133.	US Varennes (11)	1–6	FC Vitry-en-Charollais (10)
134.	AS Seurre (12)	0–3	Champforgeuil FC (10)
135.	Olympique Merceuil (12)	1–1 (4–5 p)	ASC Manlay (10)
136.	FC Uxeau (11)	1–2	Gachères FC (10)
137.	ASJ Torcy (11)	6–1	Pouilly Besiktas (11)
138.	US Nolay (11)	1–5	Team Montceau Foot (9)
139.	UFC de l'Ouche (11)	0–9	FC Bois du Verne (11)
140.	US Crissotine (9)	3–3 (4–5 p)	AS Mellecey-Mercurey (10)
141.	ASC Plombières-Lès-Dijon (10)	6–0	AS Canton du Bligny-sur-Ouche (11)
142.	US Blanzy (9)	2–7	JS Montchanin ODRA (7)
143.	Dijon ULFE (11)	0–8	Mâcon FC (7)
144.	FC Grésilles (11)	0–3	CL Marsannay-la-Côte (7)
145.	FC Saint-Rémy (10)	0–2	FR Saint Marcel (7)
146.	AS Lacanche (10)	3–0	FC Igéen (11)
147.	Viré Lugny Haut Mâconnais (11)	0–4	US Sennecey-le-Grand et son Canton (8)
148.	Vigneronne Sportive Romanechoise (11)	0–5	US Cluny (8)
149.	ES Branges (10)	0–1	Dun Sornin Chauffailles Brionnais (8)
150.	CS Orion (11)	3–0	AC Turque de Mâcon (10)
151.	AS Pouilly-en-Auxois (9)	2–2 (3–4 p)	FC Sennecé-lès-Mâcon (8)
152.	CF Talant (11)	4–0	US Saint-Bonnet/La Guiche (8)
153.	SLF Sevrey (11)	0–4	Montcenis FC (10)
154.	FC Dompierre-Matour (11)	0–3	JS Mâconnaise (9)
155.	CS Tramayes (10)	0–1	RC Flacé Mâcon (10)
156.	JS Crechoise (9)	1–3	SR Clayettois (9)
157.	Joncy Salornay Val de Guye (10)	0–2	FC La Roche-Vineuse (9)
158.	Chalon ACF (9)	2–2 (4–3 p)	ASL Lux (9)
159.	Flamboyants Football Chalonnais (10)	3–1	US Rully Fontaines (10)
160.	AS Cheminots Chagnotins (10)	1–3	FC Marmagne (10)
161.	ASI Vougeot (11)	1–1 (3–4 p)	Saint-Vallier Sport (9)
162.	FC Verdunois (10)	1–0	FLL Gergy-Verjux (9)
163.	SC Etangois (10)	1–2	EJS Épinacoise (10)
164.	US Givry-Saint-Désert (10)	1–5	US Buxynoise (9)
165.	AS Gevrey-Chambertin (8)	2–4	US Meursault (8)
166.	AS Châtenoy-le-Royal (8)	6–1	FC Corgoloin-Ladoix (8)

=== Second round ===
These matches were played on 27 and 28 August 2022.

Second round results: Bourgogne-Franche-Comté
Tie no	Home team (tier)	Score	Away team (tier)
1.	ASFC Belfort (8)	0–1	SCM Valdoie (8)
2.	AS Nord Territoire (9)	3–1	US Larians-et-Munans (7)
3.	AS Essert (10)	2–2 (4–5 p)	ES Pays Maîchois (7)
4.	FC Villars-sous-Écot/Saint-Maurice/Blussans (10)	3–0	AS Guyans-Vennes (10)
5.	FC Seloncourt (10)	0–1	AS Méziré-Fesches-le-Châtel (8)
6.	AS Avoudrey (10)	2–2 (3–4 p)	FC Bart (7)
7.	FC Suarce (11)	0–4	FC Vesoul (6)
8.	FC Le Russey (10)	0–3	UOP Mathay (10)
9.	Rougemont Concorde (9)	0–0 (4–2 p)	US Les Écorces (8)
10.	SR Delle (8)	1–3	AS Audincourt (6)
11.	SC Saint Loup-Corbenay-Magnoncourt (8)	3–0	AS Hérimoncourt (9)
12.	AS Pierrefontaine et Laviron (11)	1–1 (4–3 p)	SG Héricourt (8)
13.	AS Bavilliers (7)	1–3	US Pont-de-Roide (6)
14.	AS Fougerolles (10)	1–2	FC Noidanais (7)
15.	SR Villars-sous-Dampjoux (11	0–4	US Sochaux (7)
16.	Olympique Courcelles-lès-Montbéliard (10)	1–2	JS Lure (6)
17.	ASC Montbéliard (9)	1–1 (3–4 p)	AS Orchamps-Val de Vennes (8)
18.	AS Courtefontaine-Les Plains (10)	4–0	US Arcey (9)
19.	AS Mélisey-Saint Barthélemy (8)	1–2	AS Belfort Sud (6)
20.	FC 3 Cantons (10)	6–2	AS Rougegoutte (10)
21.	FC Massif Haut Doubs (11)	1–1 (3–2 p)	ES Les Sapins (10)
22.	Arcade Foot (8)	3–0	SC Villers-le-Lac (8)
23.	Amancey-Bolandoz-Chantrans Foot (10)	1–3	FC Valdahon-Vercel (6)
24.	FC Haut Jura (9)	1–1 (4–5 p)	AS Etalans Vernierfontaine (10)
25.	US Les Quatre Monts (11)	1–2	CS Frasne (8)
26.	FC Lac-Remoray-Vaux (10)	10–0	ES Charquemont (11)
27.	ES Les Fonges 91 (9)	0–0 (6–7 p)	AS Ornans (6)
28.	Grandvaux Foot (10)	2–1	FC Chatillon-Devecey (11)
29.	ES Doubs (8)	0–2	FC Liévremont-Arçon (9)
30.	AS Mont d'Usiers (10)	1–3	FCC La Joux (7)
31.	AS Château de Joux (8)	1–2	FC Champagnole (6)
32.	AS Levier (6)	0–3	AS Baume-les-Dames (6)
33.	US Doubs Sud (10)	0–6	Fontaine-lès-Dijon FC (7)
34.	FC Premier Plateau (10)	3–0	FC Brenne-Orain (10)
35.	Jura Nord Foot (9)	2–2 (1–4 p)	AF Audeux/Pelousey/Pouilley-les-Vignes (7)
36.	Olympique Chaignay (12)	2–1	FC Remilly (11)
37.	AS Perrouse (7)	1–2	FC 4 Rivières 70 (6)
38.	Val de Norge FC (10)	0–6	ES Fauverney-Rouvres-Bretenière (6)
39.	FC Aiglepierre (10)	1–3	ALC Longvic (8)
40.	FC Plaine 39 (10)	2–2 (4–5 p)	FC Aiserey-Izeure (10)
41.	SC Besançon (12)	0–0 (3–4 p)	Entente Roche-Novillars (7)
42.	AS Montbarrey (11)	1–3	EF Villages (7)
43.	FEP Autrey-lès-Gray (10)	2–3	ES Marnaysienne (8)
44.	ISS Pleure (10)	3–1	AS Plateau de La Barêche (10)
45.	FC Grand Besançon (9)	2–2 (4–3 p)	Poligny-Grimont FC (7)
46.	FC Les 2 Vels (10)	0–4	US Cheminots Dijonnais (6)
47.	Thise-Chalezeule FC (10)	2–0	AS Genlis (9)
48.	FC Saulon-Corcelles (10)	0–3	US Saint-Vit (6)
49.	ASC Besançon Mahoraise (9)	0–2	FC Montfaucon-Morre-Gennes-La Vèze (7)
50.	RC Saônois (8)	0–2	CCS Val d'Amour Mont-sous-Vaudrey (7)
51.	US Rioz-Étuz-Cussey (7)	2–0	AS Saint Usage Saint-Jean-de-Losne (7)
52.	FC Aignay Baigneux (10)	1–2	FC Rochefort Athletic (9)
53.	ESJA Myon-Chay Intercommunal (11)	3–7	FC Neuilly-Crimolois Sennecey (10)
54.	UF Tonnerrois (10)	2–2 (6–5 p)	Amicale Franco-Portugais Sens (8)
55.	AS Pouilly-sur-Loire (10)	3–0	AS Chablis (8)
56.	AS Magny (7)	1–0	Paron FC (6)
57.	US Cerisiers (8)	0–2	Avallon FCO (7)
58.	SC Gron Véron (10)	1–2	ES Appoigny (7)
59.	ACB Soucy-Thorigny (11)	0–2	FC Saint-Rémy-les-Montbard (8)
60.	CSP Charmoy (11)	1–2	AS Gurgy (9)
61.	Montbard Venarey (9)	0–7	Stade Auxerrois (6)
62.	Union Châtillonniase Colombine (9)	6–0	US Toucycoise (8)
63.	US Varennes (9)	2–1	FC Coulanges-la-Vineuse (10)
64.	US Semur-Époisses (10)	1–3	ASUC Migennes (8)
65.	FC Quarré Saint-Germain (11)	0–10	FC Sens (6)
66.	SC Châteaurenaud (8)	1–1 (3–5 p)	Jura Lacs Foot (6)
67.	GC Beaufort (11)	1–4	Olympique Montmorot (9)
68.	FR Archelange-Gredisans-Menotey (11)	0–5 (Note: AS Aromas penalised for fielding an ineligible player, FR Archelange-Gredisans-Menotey qualify.)	AS Aromas (11)
69.	CS Mervans (8)	0–3	RC Lons-le-Saunier (6)
70.	AFC Cuiseaux-Champagnat (10)	2–3	AS Sornay (8)
71.	AS Vaux-lès-Saint-Claude (10)	2–3	US Coteaux de Seille (8)
72.	FC Épervans (9)	0–1	Bresse Jura Foot (6)
73.	FC Macornay Val de Sorne (9)	3–2	ES Saint-Germain-du-Plaine-Baudrières (10)
74.	ES Montponnaise (12)	1–0	AS Sagy (8)
75.	Sud Foot 71 (8)	0–5	AS Garchizy (6)
76.	UF La Machine (8)	1–1 (5–3 p)	US La Charité (6)
77.	Aillant SF (10)	1–0	AS Fourchambault (8)
78.	US Cercycoise (10)	0–0 (3–4 p)	CS Corbigeois (10)
79.	AS Cossaye (11)	1–2	Étoile Sud Nivernaise 58 (8)
80.	US Revermontaise (10)	2–9	ASA Vauzelles (7)
81.	FC Autun (10)	0–8	Sud Nivernais Imphy Decize (7)
82.	US Rigny-sur-Arroux (9)	2–2 (6–7 p)	FC Clessé (10)
83.	US Coulanges-lès-Nevers (9)	7–0	US Charolles (10)
84.	RC Nevers-Challuy Sermoise (8)	1–3	FC Nevers 58 (7)
85.	AS Ciry-le-Noble (10)	0–5	AS Saint-Benin (7)
86.	FC Nevers Banlay (8)	1–2	US Saint-Sernin-du-Bois (6)
87.	ÉFC Demigny (10)	0–5	US Cheminots Paray (6)
88.	SR Clayettois (9)	4–1	AS Mellecey-Mercurey (10)
89.	ASC Manlay (10)	1–4	Mâcon FC (7)
90.	Flamboyants Football Chalonnais (10)	0–3	FR Saint Marcel (7)
91.	Saint-Vallier Sport (9)	1–2	US Meursault (8)
92.	Montcenis FC (10)	0–2	JS Montchanin ODRA (7)
93.	US Sennecey-le-Grand et son Canton (8)	2–1	Chalon ACF (9)
94.	AS Lacanche (10)	0–4	ASPTT Dijon (6)
95.	FC Bois du Verne (11)	4–2	CS Orion (11)
96.	ASC Plombières-Lès-Dijon (10)	0–9	AS Beaune (7)
97.	FC Marmagne (10)	1–2	AS Chapelloise (6)
98.	FC Chalon (6)	5–1	JO Le Creusot (7)
99.	AS Châtenoy-le-Royal (8)	1–1 (4–5 p)	Team Montceau Foot (9)
100.	EJS Épinacoise (10)	0–1	ESA Breuil (7)
101.	FC Vitry-en-Charollais (10)	1–2	US Buxynoise (9)
102.	RC Flacé Mâcon (10)	1–1 (3–4 p)	CF Talant (11)
103.	FC La Roche-Vineuse (9)	0–3	CS Sanvignes (7)
104.	ASJ Torcy (11)	0–3	US Cluny (8)
105.	FC Sennecé-lès-Mâcon (8)	6–2	Dun Sornin Chauffailles Brionnais (8)
106.	Gachères FC (10)	1–2	Chevigny Saint-Sauveur (7)
107.	JS Mâconnaise (9)	6–2	FC Verdunois (10)
108.	CL Marsannay-la-Côte (7)	4–2 (Note: Tie reversed from original draw.)	Champforgeuil FC (10)

=== Third round ===
These matches were played on 10 and 11 September 2022.

Third round results: Bourgogne-Franche-Comté
Tie no	Home team (tier)	Score	Away team (tier)
1.	CS Corbigeois (10)	0–3	ASUC Migennes (8)
2.	Aillant SF (10)	0–6	Avallon FCO (7)
3.	AS Gurgy (9)	0–1	AS Saint-Benin (7)
4.	AS Pouilly-sur-Loire (10)	1–4	ASA Vauzelles (7)
5.	Étoile Sud Nivernaise 58 (8)	1–8	Union Cosnoise Sportive (5)
6.	FC Nevers 58 (7)	3–2	Stade Auxerrois (6)
7.	AS Garchizy (6)	3–1	AS Magny (7)
8.	FC Saint-Rémy-les-Montbard (8)	3–0	US Varennes (9)
9.	UF Tonnerrois (10)	2–2 (3–4 p)	US Coulanges-lès-Nevers (9)
10.	ES Appoigny (7)	2–5	ASC Saint-Apollinaire (5)
11.	Sud Nivernais Imphy Decize (7)	1–3	AS Quetigny (5)
12.	UF La Machine (8)	0–1	FC Sens (6)
13.	US Cluny (8)	1–4	ES Fauverney-Rouvres-Bretenière (6)
14.	FC Neuilly-Crimolois Sennecey (10)	0–6	AS Beaune (7)
15.	US Cheminots Dijonnais (6)	4–0	ESA Breuil (7)
16.	US Buxynoise (9)	1–5	FR Saint Marcel (7)
17.	CS Sanvignes (7)	0–3	FC Gueugnon (5)
18.	EF Villages (7)	2–5	Is-Selongey Football (5)
19.	CF Talant (11)	1–2	Team Montceau Foot (9)
20.	Olympique Chaignay (12)	0–5	FC Chalon (6)
21.	FC Clessé (10)	2–3	CL Marsannay-la-Côte (7)
22.	ES Montponnaise (12)	0–14	FC Montceau Bourgogne (5)
23.	ASPTT Dijon (6)	2–2 (3–4 p)	Chevigny Saint-Sauveur (7)
24.	FC Aiserey-Izeure (10)	1–5	US Saint-Sernin-du-Bois (6)
25.	Union Châtillonniase Colombine (9)	7–1	SR Clayettois (9)
26.	Fontaine-lès-Dijon FC (7)	4–1	US Meursault (8)
27.	JS Montchanin ODRA (7)	1–3	US Cheminots Paray (6)
28.	FC Bois du Verne (11)	1–4	ALC Longvic (8)
29.	JS Mâconnaise (9)	0–9	FCC La Joux (7)
30.	FR Archelange-Gredisans-Menotey (11)	0–4	AS Sornay (8)
31.	ISS Pleure (10)	0–2	Arcade Foot (8)
32.	FC Rochefort Athletic (9)	1–2	FC Sennecé-lès-Mâcon (8)
33.	RC Lons-le-Saunier (6)	0–4	UF Mâconnais (5)
34.	CCS Val d'Amour Mont-sous-Vaudrey (7)	1–5	Bresse Jura Foot (6)
35.	FC Macornay Val de Sorne (9)	0–8	AS Chapelloise (6)
36.	Olympique Montmorot (9)	1–3	FC Champagnole (6)
37.	Grandvaux Foot (10)	0–1	US Sennecey-le-Grand et son Canton (8)
38.	Jura Lacs Foot (6)	0–0 (3–4 p)	Mâcon FC (7)
39.	US Coteaux de Seille (8)	0–2	Jura Dolois Football (5)
40.	Thise-Chalezeule FC (10)	0–4	Besançon Football (5)
41.	FC Premier Plateau (10)	2–1	AS Baume-les-Dames (6)
42.	Entente Roche-Novillars (7)	2–1	AF Audeux/Pelousey/Pouilley-les-Vignes (7)
43.	FC Lac-Remoray-Vaux (10)	1–3	FC Montfaucon-Morre-Gennes-La Vèze (7)
44.	AS Orchamps-Val de Vennes (8)	0–1	CS Frasne (8)
45.	AS Ornans (6)	2–2 (4–5 p)	FC Valdahon-Vercel (6)
46.	US Rioz-Étuz-Cussey (7)	1–4	CA Pontarlier (5)
47.	FC Massif Haut Doubs (11)	2–2 (4–3 p)	ES Marnaysienne (8)
48.	FC Liévremont-Arçon (9)	1–1 (1–3 p)	FC Grand Besançon (9)
49.	AS Etalans Vernierfontaine (10)	0–4	US Saint-Vit (6)
50.	FC Noidanais (7)	1–0	US Sochaux (7)
51.	FC 3 Cantons (10)	1–3	AS Méziré-Fesches-le-Châtel (8)
52.	AS Courtefontaine-Les Plains (10)	0–4	FC Bart (7)
53.	UOP Mathay (10)	0–4	JS Lure (6)
54.	US Pont-de-Roide (6)	0–2	FC Morteau-Montlebon (5)
55.	AS Nord Territoire (9)	1–3	SC Saint Loup-Corbenay-Magnoncourt (8)
56.	ES Pays Maîchois (7)	1–1 (4–5 p)	FC Vesoul (6)
57.	FC Villars-sous-Écot/Saint-Maurice/Blussans (10)	2–4	FC 4 Rivières 70 (6)
58.	AS Pierrefontaine et Laviron (11)	0–6	FC Grandvillars (5)
59.	Rougemont Concorde (9)	1–2	AS Audincourt (6)
60.	SCM Valdoie (8)	1–2	AS Belfort Sud (6)

=== Fourth round ===
These matches were played on 24 and 25 September 2022.

Fourth round results: Bourgogne-Franche-Comté
Tie no	Home team (tier)	Score	Away team (tier)
1.	US Coulanges-lès-Nevers (9)	1–3	US Cheminots Dijonnais (6)
2.	ASUC Migennes (8)	1–3	Is-Selongey Football (5)
3.	Union Cosnoise Sportive (5)	2–0	US Cheminots Paray (6)
4.	Avallon FCO (7)	1–0	FC Saint-Rémy-les-Montbard (8)
5.	ASA Vauzelles (7)	0–1	FC Nevers 58 (7)
6.	US Saint-Sernin-du-Bois (6)	0–0 (4–3 p)	AS Beaune (7)
7.	Team Montceau Foot (9)	1–1 (4–3 p)	AS Garchizy (6)
8.	AS Saint-Benin (7)	1–4	Louhans-Cuiseaux FC (4)
9.	FC Chalon (6)	0–2	FC Gueugnon (5)
10.	ALC Longvic (8)	4–3	Union Châtillonniase Colombine (9)
11.	FC Montceau Bourgogne (5)	0–0 (3–4 p)	FC Sens (6)
12.	AS Sornay (8)	2–3	ASC Saint-Apollinaire (5)
13.	FCC La Joux (7)	4–2	Chevigny Saint-Sauveur (7)
14.	FC Grand Besançon (9)	0–3	CL Marsannay-la-Côte (7)
15.	FR Saint Marcel (7)	0–0 (2–4 p)	FC Sennecé-lès-Mâcon (8)
16.	AS Quetigny (5)	1–2	UF Mâconnais (5)
17.	AS Chapelloise (6)	2–4	Racing Besançon (4)
18.	US Sennecey-le-Grand et son Canton (8)	5–2	ES Fauverney-Rouvres-Bretenière (6)
19.	US Saint-Vit (6)	0–7	Jura Sud Foot (4)
20.	Mâcon FC (7)	0–16	Jura Dolois Football (5)
21.	Arcade Foot (8)	1–3	Bresse Jura Foot (6)
22.	FC Champagnole (6)	0–0 (10–9 p)	Fontaine-lès-Dijon FC (7)
23.	FC Morteau-Montlebon (5)	3–0	FC Valdahon-Vercel (6)
24.	FC Premier Plateau (10)	0–5	FC Grandvillars (5)
25.	JS Lure (6)	0–3	ASM Belfort (4)
26.	FC Vesoul (6)	1–1 (5–3 p)	FC Noidanais (7)
27.	FC Bart (7)	3–1	CS Frasne (8)
28.	AS Belfort Sud (6)	3–1	Entente Roche-Novillars (7)
29.	SC Saint Loup-Corbenay-Magnoncourt (8)	1–2	FC 4 Rivières 70 (6)
30.	FC Montfaucon-Morre-Gennes-La Vèze (7)	0–4	CA Pontarlier (5)
31.	FC Massif Haut Doubs (11)	1–3	AS Méziré-Fesches-le-Châtel (8)
32.	AS Audincourt (6)	1–3	Besançon Football (5)

=== Fifth round ===
These matches were played on 8 and 9 October 2022.

Fifth round results: Bourgogne-Franche-Comté
Tie no	Home team (tier)	Score	Away team (tier)
1.	Is-Selongey Football (5)	1–1 (4–5 p)	Racing Besançon (4)
2.	FC Sens (6)	0–4	Louhans-Cuiseaux FC (4)
3.	US Cheminots Dijonnais (6)	2–0	Avallon FCO (7)
4.	Besançon Football (5)	1–2	Union Cosnoise Sportive (5)
5.	US Sennecey-le-Grand et son Canton (8)	1–1 (11–12 p)	Jura Dolois Football (5)
6.	FC Gueugnon (5)	3–1	US Saint-Sernin-du-Bois (6)
7.	ALC Longvic (8)	1–1 (10–9 p)	Team Montceau Foot (9)
8.	FC Nevers 58 (7)	2–3	FC 4 Rivières 70 (6)
9.	FC Bart (7)	0–4	Jura Sud Foot (4)
10.	FC Morteau-Montlebon (5)	2–1	FC Vesoul (6)
11.	FC Sennecé-lès-Mâcon (8)	0–3	FC Grandvillars (5)
12.	FCC La Joux (7)	0–3	ASC Saint-Apollinaire (5)
13.	Bresse Jura Foot (6)	3–0	AS Belfort Sud (6)
14.	FC Champagnole (6)	0–3	ASM Belfort (4)
15.	CL Marsannay-la-Côte (7)	3–0	AS Méziré-Fesches-le-Châtel (8)
16.	CA Pontarlier (5)	1–1 (6–7 p)	UF Mâconnais (5)

=== Sixth round ===
These matches were played on 15 and 16 October 2022.

Sixth round results: Bourgogne-Franche-Comté
Tie no	Home team (tier)	Score	Away team (tier)
1.	Jura Dolois Football (5)	6–0	US Cheminots Dijonnais (6)
2.	Racing Besançon (4)	1–4	ASM Belfort (4)
3.	ALC Longvic (8)	0–6	Louhans-Cuiseaux FC (4)
4.	FC 4 Rivières 70 (6)	2–3	UF Mâconnais (5)
5.	CL Marsannay-la-Côte (7)	0–5	ASC Saint-Apollinaire (5)
6.	Jura Sud Foot (4)	4–0	FC Grandvillars (5)
7.	Union Cosnoise Sportive (5)	4–0	Bresse Jura Foot (6)
8.	FC Morteau-Montlebon (5)	0–2	FC Gueugnon (5)
