= Beaune FC =

French football club

- Full name: Beaune Football Club
- Founded: 1919
- Ground: Stade du Château de Vignoles, Beaune
- Chairman: Yves Lemaire
- Manager: Sylvain Ducloux since 2008
- League: Championnat de France Amateurs 2
- 2008–2009: DH, promoted

Beaune Football Club is a French football club based in Beaune, Côte-d'Or, founded in 1919. Its previous names were Union Sportive Beaunoise, Fils de France, Association des Patronages Laiques de Beaune and Association Sportive Beaunoise.

The club currently plays in the Championnat de France Amateurs 2, the fifth tier of the French football league system, after winning promotion in the 2008–09 season.
