= Jura Dolois Football =

French football club

Jura Dolois
- Full name: Jura Dolois Football
- Founded: 1991
- Ground: Stade Robert Bobin, Dole
- Chairman: Mohamed MBITEL
- Manager: Hervé Saclier
- League: National 3 Group J
- 2022–23: National 3 Group E, 3rd
Home colours	Away colours

Jura Dolois Football (French pronunciation: [ʒyʁa dɔlus]; commonly referred to as Jura Dolois) is a French football club based in Dole in the Franche-Comté region. The club was founded in 1991 under the name Dole-Tavaux Racing Club following the merger of local clubs FC Dole, which was formed in 1907, and US Tavaux-Damparis, which was formed in 1932. The club adopted its current name in 2006 and receiving backing and support from the commune Dole and its surrounding areas. Jura Dolois share a partnership with nearby professional club Dijon FCO. The club currently plays in the Championnat National 3, the fifth division of French football, after achieving promotion from the Division d'Honneur most recently in the 2016–17 season.

== Current squad ==
As of 20 March 2019. Note: Flags indicate national team as defined under FIFA eligibility rules; some limited exceptions apply. Players may hold more than one non-FIFA nationality.

No.	Pos.	Nation	Player
—	GK	(France) FRA	Antoine Bianconi
—	DF	(France) FRA	Vincent Lanoix
—	DF	(France) FRA	Yacine Saadi
—	DF	(France) FRA	Hassan Dincer
—	DF	(France) FRA	Théo Jean-Prost
—	DF	(France) FRA	Rémy Thevenot
—	MF	(France) FRA	Abdelhak El Fadil

No.	Pos.	Nation	Player
—	MF	(France) FRA	Thomas Hugonnet
—	MF	(France) FRA	Joris Ivol
—	MF	(France) FRA	Antoine Mauchamp
—	MF	(France) FRA	Youness Sabeg
—	MF	(France) FRA	Ilyas El Khabchi
—	FW	(France) FRA	Adrien Decombe
