= CA Pontarlier =

French football club

- Full name: Club athlétique de Pontarlier
- Nickname(s): les Bleus
- Founded: 1911
- Stadium: Stade Paul Robbe
- Capacity: 2980
- Manager: Michel Chevrey
- Coach: Jean-Luc Courtet
- League: National 3 Group J
- 2022–23: National 3 Group E, 2nd
- Website: http://capontarlierfoot.com/
Home colours	Away colours

Cercle Athlétique Pontarlier is a French association football team founded in 1911. They are based in Pontarlier, Franche-Comté, France and as of the 2019–20 season they are playing in the Championnat National 3, the fifth tier in the French football league system. They play at the Stade Paul Robbe in Pontarlier.
