= FR Saint Marcel =

French football club

FR Saint-Marcel
- Full name: Football Réunis de Saint-Marcel
- Founded: 1988
- League: Régional 2 Bourgogne-Franche-Comté
- 2025–26: Régional 1 Bourgogne-Franche-Comté Group A, 11th of 12 (relegated)
Home colours

Football Réunis de Saint-Marcel is a French football club based in Saint-Marcel in the Bourgogne region. The original incarnation of the club was founded in the 1940s under the name Sports Réunis de Saint-Marcel. On 26 May 1988, the club merged with Football Club de Saint-Marcel to form the club that exists today. Saint-Marcel plays in the Régional 2, the seventh tier division of French football, as of the 2026–27 season.
