= Is-Selongey Football =

French football club

Is-Selongey Football is a French association football team formed in 1920 as US Selongey, which then became Sporting Club de Selongey in 1931. SC Selongey merged with Réveil Is-sur-Tille Football in June 2018, taking the current Is-Selongey Football name. They are based in Selongey, Bourgogne, France and are currently playing in the Championnat National 3, the fifth tier in the French football league system.

== Current squad ==
As of 21 March 2019

Note: Flags indicate national team as defined under FIFA eligibility rules; some limited exceptions apply. Players may hold more than one non-FIFA nationality.

No.	Pos.	Nation	Player
—	GK	FRA	Lucas Passoni
—	GK	FRA	Benjamin Dubois
—	DF	FRA	Stéphane Blot
—	DF	LAO	Victor Ngovinassack
—	DF	FRA	Joffrey Obi
—	DF	FRA	Antoine Bégin
—	DF	FRA	Julian Grosmaire
—	DF	FRA	Fabien Putigny
—	DF	FRA	Florent Urfer
—	DF	FRA	Quentin Zanotti
—	MF	FRA	Junior Abbew Buckman
—	MF	FRA	Damien Bagrowski

No.	Pos.	Nation	Player
—	MF	FRA	Charlie Casanova
—	MF	FRA	Romain Jacotot
—	MF	FRA	Valentin Mubiala
—	MF	FRA	Gatien Muroni
—	MF	FRA	Ismail Oumakhou
—	MF	FRA	Anthony Pitois
—	MF	FRA	Stéphane Rivera
—	MF	FRA	Walid Abeid
—	FW	FRA	Souhayel Belhadj
—	FW	FRA	Othman Stitou
—	FW	FRA	Alexandre Ribeiro
