= AS Ornans =

French football club

Ornans
- Full name: Association Sportive d'Ornans
- Ground: Stade André Brey, Ornans
- Chairman: Laurent Chabod
- Manager: Yannick Renou
- League: Regional 1 Bourgogne-Franche-Comté
- 2016-17: CFA 2 Group E, 14th (relegated)

Association Sportive d'Ornans is a French association football club. They are based in the town of Ornans and their home stadium is the Stade André Brey. As of the 2017-18 season, they play in the Regional 1 Bourgogne-Franche-Comté, effectively the sixth level of the French football league system.
