= FC Chalon =

French football club

Football Club Chalonnais
- Full name: Football Club Chalon-sur-Saône
- Founded: 1926
- Ground: Stade Léo Lagrange
- Capacity: 2,300
- Chairman: Fabrice Jay
- Manager: Thierry Fayolle et Hervé Monvoisin
- League: DH Burgundy
- 2010–11: DH Burgundy, 3rd
- Website: http://www.fcchalon.com/accueil/fc_chalon

Football Club Chalon-sur-Saône (often referred to as Football Club Chalonnais) is a French football club based in the Commune of Chalon-sur-Saône, in the Saône-et-Loire department of eastern France.

Founded in 1926, the club's traditional colours are blue and yellow. Their home stadium is Stade Léo Lagrange, in Chalon-sur-Saône, which has a capacity of 2,300. They currently play in Division d'Honneur Burgundy, having been relegated from Championnat de France amateur 2 in 2009. The club reached the last 64 of the Coupe de France in 2000–01 and, again, the following year.

== League history ==
The club joined the Burgundy Division d'Honneur in 1945, which they have won seven times as of 2011. They won promotion to the Championnat de France amateur for the first time in 1957 and were promoted to Division 3 in 1983, where they achieved their highest ever league placing of sixth in 1987.

As of the 2010–2011 season, the club play in the Burgundy regional Division Honneur, at the sixth tier in the French football league system, finishing third in the 2010–2011 season, although it has reached as high as the Championnat de France amateur, the fourth tier, where it played between 1983 and 1988.

== Coupe de France ==
Chalonnais reached the last 64 of the Coupe de France in 2000-01 and 2001–02.

- 2000–01 - lost to Stade de Reims, at home, 4–1 on penalties after drawing 1–1.
- 2001–02 - lost to CS Sedan Ardennes, at home, 3–2.
