= 2008–09 Grenoble Foot 38 season =

Grenoble Foot 38
2008–09 season
- President: Kazutoshi Watanabe
- Head coach: Mehmed Baždarević
- Stadium: Stade des Alpes
- Ligue 1: 13th
- Coupe de France: Semi-finals
- Coupe de la Ligue: Third round
- Top goalscorer: League: Nassim Akrour (6); All: Nassim Akrour (9)
- Average home league attendance: 17,217
Home colours	Away colours

The 2008–09 season was the 98th season in the history of Grenoble Foot 38 and the club's first season back in the top flight of French football since 1963. In addition to the domestic league, Grenoble participated in this season's editions of the Coupe de France and the Coupe de la Ligue.

== Players ==
=== First-team squad ===
Note: Flags indicate national team as defined under FIFA eligibility rules; some limited exceptions apply. Players may hold more than one non-FIFA nationality.

No.	Pos.	Nation	Player
1	GK	(France) FRA	Grégory Wimbée (captain)
2	MF	(France) FRA	Laurent Courtois
3	DF	(France) FRA	Sandy Paillot
4	DF	(France) FRA	Maxence Flachez
5	DF	(France) FRA	Martial Robin
6	MF	(Togo) TOG	Alaixys Romao
7	MF	(Bulgaria) BUL	Hristo Yanev
8	MF	(France) FRA	Sofiane Feghouli
9	FW	(France) FRA	Daniel Moreira
10	MF	(France) FRA	Laurent Batlles
11	MF	(Serbia) SRB	Miloš Dimitrijević
12	DF	(Slovenia) SVN	Boštjan Cesar
13	MF	(France) FRA	Mathieu Gianni
14	DF	(Tunisia) TUN	David Jemmali
15	DF	(Serbia) SRB	Zoran Rendulić
16	GK	(France) FRA	Paul Cattier

No.	Pos.	Nation	Player
17	FW	(Algeria) ALG	Nassim Akrour
18	MF	(France) FRA	Laurent Macquet
19	FW	(Cameroon) CMR	Pierre Boya
20	FW	(Japan) JPN	Sho Ito
21	DF	(Morocco) MAR	Walid Regragui
22	FW	(Guinea) GUI	Larson Touré
23	FW	(France) FRA	Elliot Grandin
24	MF	(Cameroon) CMR	Albert Baning
25	DF	(Republic of the Congo) CGO	Francis N'Ganga
26	FW	(France) FRA	Yoric Ravet
27	DF	(Serbia) SRB	Milivoje Vitakić
28	FW	(Morocco) MAR	Bouchaib El Moubarki
29	DF	(France) FRA	Jimmy Mainfroi
30	GK	(France) FRA	Ronan Le Crom
31	FW	(Germany) GER	Mustafa Kučuković

== Pre-season and friendlies ==
Win Draw Loss

== Competitions ==
=== Overall record ===
Competition	First match	Last match	Starting round	Final position	Record							
Competition	First match	Last match	Starting round	Final position	Pld	W	D	L	GF	GA	GD	Win %
Ligue 1	9 August 2008	30 May 2009	Matchday 1	13th	38	10	14	14	24	37	−13	26.32
Coupe de France	3 January 2009	21 April 2009	Round of 64	Semi-finals	5	2	2	1	6	3	+3	40.00
Coupe de France	24 September 2008		Third round	Third round	1	0	0	1	2	3	−1	0.00
Total					44	12	16	16	32	43	−11	27.27

Source: Competitions

=== Ligue 1 ===
==== League table ====
Pos	Team	Pld	W	D	L	GF	GA	GD	Pts
11	Monaco	38	11	12	15	41	45	−4	45
12	Valenciennes	38	10	14	14	35	42	−7	44
13	Grenoble	38	10	14	14	24	37	−13	44
14	Sochaux	38	10	12	16	40	48	−8	42
15	Nancy	38	10	12	16	38	47	−9	42

Source: Ligue 1
Rules for classification: 1) points; 2) goal difference; 3) number of goals scored.
France's third UEFA Europa League spot went to Ligue 2 side Guingamp, winners of 2008–09 Coupe de France.

==== Results summary ====
Overall								Home						Away					
Pld	W	D	L	GF	GA	GD	Pts	W	D	L	GF	GA	GD	W	D	L	GF	GA	GD
38	10	14	14	24	37	−13	44	6	7	6	9	13	−4	4	7	8	15	24	−9

Source: Ligue 1

==== Results by round ====
Round	1	2	3	4	5	6	7	8	9	10	11	12	13	14	15	16	17	18	19	20	21	22	23	24	25	26	27	28	29	30	31	32	33	34	35	36	37	38
Ground	A	H	A	H	A	H	A	H	A	A	H	A	H	A	H	A	H	A	H	A	H	A	H	A	H	A	H	H	A	H	A	H	A	H	A	H	A	H
Result	W	W	L	W	D	L	W	L	D	W	D	D	L	L	D	D	D	L	W	L	L	L	D	D	D	D	W	W	L	L	L	W	W	D	L	D	D	L
Position	2	1	7	5	4	8	4	8	10	7	6	8	9	11	11	12	13	14	11	12	12	14	13	13	13	13	9	9	12	13	14	13	11	12	12	12	13	13

Source: Ligue 1
A = Away; H = Home; W = Win; D = Draw; L = Loss

==== Matches ====
The league fixtures were announced on 23 May 2008.

9 August 2008 1	Sochaux	1–2	Grenoble

17 August 2008 2	Grenoble	1–0	Rennes

23 August 2008 3	Lyon	2–0	Grenoble

30 August 2008 4	Grenoble	1–0	Monaco

13 September 2008 5	Valenciennes	1–1	Grenoble

20 September 2008 6	Grenoble	0–1	Bordeaux

27 September 2008 7	Paris Saint-Germain	0–1	Grenoble

4 October 2008 8	Grenoble	0–1	Nantes

18 October 2008 9	Caen	2–2	Grenoble

26 October 2008 10	Saint-Étienne	0–2	Grenoble

29 October 2008 11	Grenoble	0–0	Lille

1 November 2008 12	Lorient	1–1	Grenoble

8 November 2008 13	Grenoble	0–3	Marseille

15 November 2008 14	Toulouse	2–0	Grenoble

22 November 2008 15	Grenoble	0–0	Le Havre

7 December 2008 17	Grenoble	0–0	Auxerre

10 December 2008 16	Nice	0–0	Grenoble

13 December 2008 18	Nancy	2–0	Grenoble

20 December 2008 19	Grenoble	2–1	Le Mans

10 January 2009 20	Rennes	1–0	Grenoble

17 January 2009 21	Grenoble	0–2	Lyon

31 January 2009 22	Monaco	1–0	Grenoble

8 February 2009 23	Grenoble	0–0	Valenciennes

14 February 2009 24	Bordeaux	1–1	Grenoble

21 February 2009 25	Grenoble	0–0	Paris Saint-Germain

28 February 2009 26	Nantes	1–1	Grenoble

7 March 2009 27	Grenoble	2–1	Caen

15 March 2009 28	Grenoble	1–0	Saint-Étienne

21 March 2009 29	Lille	2–1	Grenoble

4 April 2009 30	Grenoble	1–3	Lorient

12 April 2009 31	Marseille	4–1	Grenoble

18 April 2009 32	Grenoble	1–0	Toulouse

26 April 2009 33	Le Havre	0–1	Grenoble

2 May 2009 34	Grenoble	0–0	Nice

13 May 2009 35	Auxerre	2–0	Grenoble

16 May 2009 36	Grenoble	0–0	Nancy

23 May 2009 37	Le Mans	1–1	Grenoble

30 May 2009 38	Grenoble	0–1	Sochaux

=== Coupe de France ===
3 January 2009 Round of 64	US Raon-l'Étape	0–0 (a.e.t.) (3–4 p)	Grenoble	Raon-l'Étape
17:00				Stadium: Stade Paul Gasser; Attendance: 1,867

25 January 2009 Round of 32	Olympique Grande-Synthe	1–3	Grenoble	Dunkerque
15:00				Stadium: Stade Marcel Tribut; Attendance: 4,000

3 March 2009 Round of 16	Dijon	1–1 (a.e.t.) (2–4 p)	Grenoble	Dijon
19:30				Stadium: Stade Gaston Gérard; Attendance: 4,523

18 March 2009 Quarter-finals	Grenoble	2–0	Monaco	Grenoble
17:00				Stadium: Stade des Alpes

21 April 2009 Semi-finals	Grenoble	0–1	Rennes	Grenoble
20:45				Stadium: Stade des Alpes

=== Coupe de France ===
24 September 2008 Third round	Grenoble	2–3 (a.e.t.)	Nancy	Grenoble
21:00				Stadium: Stade des Alpes; Attendance: 6,419
