= 2024–25 Coupe de France preliminary rounds, Auvergne-Rhône-Alpes =

The 2024–25 Coupe de France preliminary rounds, Auvergne-Rhône-Alpes was the qualifying competition to decide which teams from the leagues of the Auvergne-Rhône-Alpes region of France took part in the main competition from the seventh round.

A total of twenty teams will qualify from the Auvergne-Rhône-Alpes preliminary rounds.

In 2023–24, Le Puy Foot 43 Auvergne reached the Quarter Final of the competition, and were the team from the preliminary rounds to progress furthest, beating Ligue 2 oppositions twice, before losing out to Stade Rennais F.C..

== Draws and fixtures ==
During the period 23 to 24 July 2024, the league met to draw the first round of the competition, and define the structure of the early rounds. The ligue also announced that 907 teams from the region had entered the competition. The first round consisted of 322 ties, featuring teams from the district level leagues, with 78 teams from this level exempted to the second round. On 29 July, modifications and corrections to the draw were published. The second round draw was published before the first round took place, and was published on 19 August 2024. The draw consisted of 271 ties, and featured the entry into the competition of the exempted district-level teams and those from the lower two regional level leagues.

The third round draw, which saw the entry of the Régional 1 and Championnat National 3 teams, was published on 4 September 2024, with 151 ties drawn. The fourth round draw was published on 17 September, with 78 ties drawn, and saw the entry in to the competition of the Championnat National 2 teams from the region. On 1 October 2024, the fifth round draw was published, with 40 ties drawn, and with the teams from Championnat National entering for the first time. The 20 ties of the sixth round draw were published on 16 October 2024.

== First round ==
These matches were played between 23 and 28 August 2024.

First Round Results: Auvergne-Rhône-Alpes
Tie no	Home team (Tier)	Score	Away team (Tier)
1.	Sainges FC (12)	0–7	AS Pleaux-Rilhac-Barriac (9)
2.	FC Albepierre-Bredons (12)	0–9	US de la Cère (11)
3.	US Loupiac Saint-Christophe (12)	2–1	US Crandelles (9)
4.	US Giou de Mamou (12)	0–6	FC des Quatre Vallées (10)
5.	ES Margeride (12)	2–4	Espérance Vieille-Brioude (11)
6.	Entente Anglards-Salers (12)	1–7	FC Artense (10)
7.	Ayrens Sport (12)	1–4	FC Moussages (10)
8.	AS Cézens (12)	2–7	AS Vebret-Antignac (11)
9.	Ydes SFC (11)	5–0	La Chapelle/Saint-Poncy FC (11)
10.	AS Neussargues (11)	1–1 (5–4 p)	Jordanne FC (9)
11.	US Besse (11)	2–4	AS Yolet (10)
12.	Aspre FC Fontanges (11)	0–2	ES Saint-Mamet (10)
13.	ES Pierrefortaise (11)	1–5	AS Belbexoise (9)
14.	AS Naucelles (11)	2–1	Carladez-Goul Sportif (10)
15.	US Cère et Landes (11)	3–3 (5–3 p)	CS Vézac (10)
16.	AS Saint-Just (11)	1–9	Saint-Georges SL (10)
17.	AS Chaudes-Aigues (11)	0–2	CS Arpajonnais (9)
18.	AS Loudes (10)	1–5	AS Cheminots Langeac (9)
19.	US Arsac-en-Velay (10)	0–2	US Vals Le Puy (9)
20.	AS Laussonne (10)	3–0	US Landos (9)
21.	AS Villettoise (11)	2–2 (1–4 p)	Olympique Retournac Beauzac (9)
22.	AS Saint-Pal-en-Chalencon (11)	1–3	AS Grazac-Lapte (9)
23.	FJEP Freycenets Saint-Jeures (10)	2–2 (5–3 p)	Haut Lignon Football (9)
24.	US Bassoise (11)	1–1 (4–3 p)	Solignac-Cussac FC (10)
25.	FC La Chapelle de l'Aurec (10)	0–3	Vigilante Saint-Pal-de-Mons (10)
26.	FC Arzon (10)	2–1	US Bains-Saint-Christophe (9)
27.	AS Chadron Saint-Martin (11)	1–4	AG Sainte-Sigolène (10)
28.	FC Pont Salomon Lusitanos (12)	0–5	US Montfaucon Montregard Raucoules (10)
29.	US Lantriac (11)	3–2	AS Pertuis (10)
30.	CO Coubon (11)	2–2 (5–6 p)	FC Dunières (10)
31.	AS Villeneuve-d'Alier Saint-Ilpize (12)	1–1 (4–2 p)	FC Venteuges (11)
32.	AS Saugues (10)	2–0	FC Vézézoux (10)
33.	CS Saint-Anthème (12)	4–1	FC Thiers Auvergne (11)
34.	FC Bouzel (12)	0–2	Pérignat FC (12)
35.	AS Clermont Toutes Nationalités (12)	2–0	RAS Beauregard l'Évêque (10)
36.	AS Sugères (12)	2–8	ES Saint-Germinoise (10)
37.	Sancy Artense Foot (11)	6–6 (3–1 p)	FC Sauxillanges Saint-Babel Brenat (9)
38.	AS Malintrat (11)	2–3	AS Moissat (9)
39.	Saint-Amant et Tallende SC (11)	4–4 (6–5 p)	FC Saint-Julien-de-Coppel (10)
40.	US Bassin Minier (9)	3–0 (Note: Tie reversed from original draw.)	ES Couze Pavin (11)
41.	ES Sauret-Besserve (12)	0–5	Portugal FC Clermont Aubière (10)
42.	ES Volcans Malauzat (11)	1–6	AS Enval-Marsat (9)
43.	CO Veyre-Monton (9)	0–6	AS Montferrand Football (none) (Note: AS Montferrand Football does not have a team in the senior leagues, but chose to enter their under-20 players in the Coupe de France.)
44.	Haute Combraille Foot (11)	1–2	FC Bromont-Lamothe/Montfermy (10)
45.	Entente Charblot (11)	2–5	US Saint-Gervaisienne (10)
46.	SC Billom (10)	3–1	FC Vertaizon (9)
47.	US Messeix Bourg-Lastic (10)	0–3	FC Blanzat (9)
48.	US Chapdes-Beaufort (10)	3–3 (3–5 p)	AS Royat (9)
49.	FC Gerzat (12)	0–9	FF Chappes (10)
50.	AS Châteaugay (11)	0–5	FC Nord Limagne (10)
51.	ALS Besse Egliseneuve (10)	2–2 (3–4 p)	FC Aubierois (9)
52.	US Ménétrol (10)	1–2	US Courpière (9)
53.	US Limons (10)	2–1	CS Pont-de-Dore (9)
54.	Entente Vallée de la Dordogne (10)	1–3	AS Orcines (9)
55.	FC Nord Combraille (10)	0–3	JS Saint-Priest-des-Champs (9)
56.	ÉS Arconsat (10)	0–5	Aulnat Sportif (9)
57.	Saint-Clément Thuret FC (10)	1–4	Clermont Métropole FC (9)
58.	Association Bibliothèque Portugaise (10)	0–3	US Maringues (9)
59.	AS Job (10)	0–2	Clermont Ouvoimoja (9)
60.	AS Joze (10)	1–2	RS Luzillat-Charnat-Vinzelles (9)
61.	AS Cellule (10)	3–3 (2–4 p)	UJ Clermontoise (9)
62.	AS Roche-Blanche FC (10)	0–0 (3–2 p)	FC Plauzat-Champeix (9)
63.	Durolle Foot (10)	0–3	AS Romagnat (9)
64.	FC Lezoux (9)	1–1 (4–3 p)	FC Mirefleurs (9)
65.	US Saint-Georges / Les Ancizes (11)	2–0	US Marcillat-Pionsat (10)
66.	ES Montagne Bourbonnaise (10)	3–3 (5–4 p)	Avenir Côte Foot (10)
67.	AS Villebret (13)	0–3 (Note: Tie won by means of forfeit.)	US Saint-Victor (10)
68.	ES Arfeuilles (12)	2–1	US Varennes-sur-Tèche (11)
69.	US Busset (12)	3–4	US Abrest (10)
70.	AS Billezois (12)	0–3	AS Val de Sioule (10)
71.	ÉS La Bruyère (12)	1–6	FC Ébreuil (11)
72.	FC Le Vivre Ensemble (12)	3–0	AS Rongères (11)
73.	ALS Chamblet (12)	0–5	US Biachette Désertines (10)
74.	US Meaulne-Braize (12)	0–4	FC Souvigny (9)
75.	Entente Mercy-Chapeau Montbeugny (12)	1–0	AS Gennetinoise (10)
76.	Magnet/Seuillet/Saint-Gérand-le-Puy Foot (12)	0–7	US Trezelles (10)
77.	AS Louchy (10)	3–0	USJ Montluçonnais (11)
78.	FR Pouzy-Mésangy (11)	1–7	Étoile Moulins Yzeure (9)
79.	Jaligny Vaumas Foot (11)	1–5	AS Nord Vignoble (9)
80.	SC Saint-Pourcain (10)	0–8	SC Avermes (9)
81.	AS Ménulphienne (11)	1–5	Espoir Molinetois (10)
82.	Médiéval Club Montluçonnais (11)	0–9	US Bien-Assis (10)
83.	US Saint-Désiré (11)	1–3	AS Tronget (10)
84.	AS Néris (11)	2–2 (4–3 p)	CS Chantelle (11)
85.	Entente Pierrefitte/Saligny Foot (11)	0–6	FC Haut d'Allier (10)
86.	AS Espinasse-Vozelle (11)	2–3	FC Billy-Crechy (10)
87.	AS Chassenard Luneau (11)	3–0	CS Bessay (10)
88.	CS Thielois (11)	0–3	AS Neuilly-le-Réal (10)
89.	ES Saint-Étienne-de-Vicq/Bost/Saint-Christophe (11)	1–8	US Chevagnes (10)
90.	Union Saulcet-Le Theil-Bransat (11)	0–2	OC Monetay-sur-Allier (11)
91.	Ballon Beaulonnais (11)	5–0	SC Gannat (11)
92.	US Lusigny (11)	3–2	JS Neuvy (11)
93.	US L'Horme (9)	3–0	Association Feu Vert (11)
94.	AS Saint-Ferréol Gampille Firminy (11)	3–3 (4–2 p)	US Métare Saint-Étienne Sud Est (10)
95.	FC Le Creux (12)	0–3	USG La Fouillouse (10)
96.	AS La Chaumière (11)	1–2	JS Cellieu (10)
97.	SS Ussonaise (12)	4–1	AS Noirétable (11)
98.	Olympique Terrenoire (12)	4–3	AC Rive-de-Gier (10)
99.	ES Montrond Cuzieu (11)	2–3	FC Roanne (12)
100.	CO La Rivière (10)	1–1 (4–3 p)	US Ecotay-Moingt (9)
101.	Saint-Étienne UC Terrenoire (11)	0–3	FCI Saint-Romain-le-Puy (9)
102.	Mably Sport (11)	4–1	ES Saint-Jean-Bonnefonds (11)
103.	FC Bords de Loire (12)	1–5	Riorges FC (11)
104.	OC Ondaine (11)	0–2	Olympique Le Coteau (10)
105.	FC Montagnes du Matin (10)	1–1 (4–3 p)	Anzieux Foot (9)
106.	Tartaras FC (13)	1–3	SC Piraillon (12)
107.	FC Commelle-Vernay (11)	5–4	AS Chambéon-Magneux (9)
108.	Rhins Trambouze Foot (11)	1–2	US Bussières (10)
109.	US Parigny Saint-Cyr (11)	2–4	AS Châteauneuf (9)
110.	Nord Roannais (11)	1–2	ASL Portugais Roanne (10)
111.	FC Mayotte Roanne (12)	2–3	Olympique Est Roannais (10)
112.	Sury SC (12)	3–0	US Sud Forézienne (12)
113.	US Briennon (12)	0–5	FC Belette de Saint-Léger (11)
114.	Périgneux Saint-Maurice Foot (11)	1–4	ABH FC (10)
115.	US Villerest (12)	1–2	FC Marcellinois (12)
116.	FC Genilac (12)	3–0	AS Jonzieux (12)
117.	FC Ouches (12)	0–1	ES Dyonisienne (11)
118.	ES Haut Forez (12)	0–3	FC Saint-Joseph-Saint-Martin (11)
119.	US Filerin (11)	2–3	FC Boisset-Chalain (11)
120.	FC Perreux (11)	3–4	FC Plaine Cleppé/Poncins (11)
121.	FC Bonson-Saint-Cyprien (11)	1–2	CS Crémeaux (10)
122.	AS Villers (12)	1–4	Bellegarde Sports (12)
123.	AS Astrée (12)	1–7	ES Champdieu-Marcilly (10)
124.	AS Cordelle (12)	0–2	AS Saint-Symphorien-de-Lay (11)
125.	AS Chausseterre Les Salles (12)	0–7	GOAL Foot (10)
126.	FC Alixan (13)	1–9	AC Allet (11)
127.	FC Montmiral Parnans (13)	1–5	AS Cancoise (11)
128.	Vivar's Club Soyons (13)	0–3	AS Homenetmen Bourg-lès Valence (11)
129.	SA Saint-Agrève (13)	1–4	FC Colombier Saint-Barthélemy (11)
130.	FC Saint-Restitut (13)	3–3 (4–5 p)	FC Tricastin (11)
131.	US Vals-les-Bains (13)	1–6	Olympique Centre Ardèche (10)
132.	Allex-Chabrillan-Eurre FC (12)	3–2	US Rochemaure (10)
133.	AS Désaignes (12)	0–5	ES Nord Drôme (11)
134.	AS La Sanne (12)	0–2	ES Boulieu-lès-Annonay (10)
135.	AS Portugaise Valence (12)	2–0	RC Mauves (10)
136.	AS Saint-Marcelloise (12)	0–2	AS Cornas (10)
137.	AS Valensolles (12)	0–0 (4–5 p)	ES Malissardoise (11)
138.	US Ancône (11)	3–1	FR Allan (10)
139.	AS Saint-Uze (12)	1–6	US Val d'Ay (11)
140.	ASF Annonay (12)	2–3	Entente Sarras Sports Saint-Vallier (9)
141.	AF Ceven (12)	1–2	AS Berg-Helvie (10)
142.	US Baixoise (12)	0–3	FC Montélimar (10)
143.	SC Bourguésan (12)	3–1	US Saint-Gervais-sur-Roubion (11)
144.	CS Châteauneuf-de-Galaure (12)	0–1	FC Larnage-Serves (11)
145.	FC Goubetois (12)	1–1 (4–5 p)	CO Châteauneuvois (10)
146.	EA Montvendre (13)	2–5	FC Hauterives US Grand Serre (11)
147.	ES Le Laris-Montchenu (12)	2–4	FC Bourguisan (11)
148.	FA Le Teil Melas (12)	5–3	US Lussas (11)
149.	FC Cheylarois (12)	3–1	FC Muzolais (10)
150.	FC 540 (12)	1–4	Diois FC (11)
151.	FC Sauzet (12)	1–2	US Vallée du Jabron (10)
152.	FC Baume Bouchet Montségur (13)	1–4	AS Roussas-Granges-Gontardes (11)
153.	FC Rambertois (12)	2–0	AS Roiffieux (11)
154.	FC Royans Vercors (12)	1–4	IF Barbières-Bésayes-Rochefort-Samson-Marches (11)
155.	FC Clérieux-Saint-Bardoux-Granges-les-Beaumont (12)	3–1	AS Dolon (11)
156.	US Meysse (12)	0–3	FC Rochegudien (11)
157.	US Portes Hautes Cévennes (10)	4–1	OS Vallée de l'Ouvèze (12)
158.	RC Savasson (12)	1–1 (3–4 p)	CO Châteauneuf-du-Rhône (11)
159.	AAJ Saint-Alban-d'Ay (12)	1–1 (3–2 p)	FC Hermitage (11)
160.	ES Saint-Alban Auriolles-Grospierres (12)	3–2	Olympique Ruomsois (11)
161.	AS Saint-Barthélemy-Grozon (12)	3–3 (5–3 p)	FC Plateau Ardèchois (11)
162.	FC Félines-Saint-Cyr-Peaugres (12)	0–2	AS Vallée du Doux (11)
163.	Olympique Saint-Montanais (12)	1–5	US Bas-Vivarais (10)
164.	US Montmeyran (12)	0–6	US Beaufort-Aouste (11)
165.	US Veyras (12)	1–5	US Drôme Provence (11)
166.	US Peyrins (12)	1–8	PS Romanaise (9)
167.	FC Bren (11)	2–7	US Mours (9)
168.	JS Saint-Paul-lès-Romans (11)	1–1 (5–4 p)	Vallis Auréa Foot (11)
169.	US Montélier (11)	1–0	FC Bourg-lès-Valence (9)
170.	FC Saint-Didier-sous-Aubenas (11)	3–1	JS Livron (11)
171.	ÉS Saint-Jeure-d'Ay-Marsan (12)	0–5	FC Portois (10)
172.	US Chanas Sablons Serrières (11)	0–5	US Millery-Vourles (9)
173.	US Saint-Martinoise (11)	7–1	AS Coucouron (11)
174.	Côtière Meximieux Villieu (11)	2–4	Olympique Rillieux (9)
175.	FC Tignieu-Jameyzieu (11)	0–3	Olympique Vaulx-en-Velin (9)
176.	AS Genay (11)	1–6	JSO Givors (9)
177.	SC Bron-Terraillon (11)	1–6	Haute Brévenne Football (9)
178.	Muroise Foot (10)	2–1	FC Virieu-Valondras (11) (Note: FC Virieu-Valondras replaced CS Verpillière in the draw.)
179.	AS Buers Villeurbanne (9)	3–1	AL Saint-Maurice-l'Exil (9)
180.	FC Grigny (11)	4–2	CS Nivolas-Vermelle (11)
181.	Saint-Quentin-Fallavier FC (11)	3–1	US Loire-Saint-Romain (9)
182.	ES Gleizé (12)	2–5	CO Saint-Fons (9)
183.	Foot Trois Rivières (11)	1–0	FC Bully (11)
184.	FC Saint-Martin-la-Sauveté (11)	3–1	FC Tarare (12)
185.	AS Rhodanienne (11)	1–3	FC Lamure Poule (9)
186.	AS Algerienne Villeurbanne (9)	6–2	AS Limas (12)
187.	AS Attignat (9)	2–0	ES Cormoranche (11)
188.	SC Maccabi Lyon (11)	0–3	US Ruy Montceau (10)
189.	Rhône Sud FC (12)	1–11	CF Estrablin (9)
190.	CS Ozon (11)	4–2	US Chatte (11)
191.	AS Toussieu (11)	5–0	US La Bâtie-Divisin (12)
192.	AS Bron Grand Lyon (10)	5–1 (Note: AS Bron Grand Lyon penalised for fielding a suspended player, FC Reneins Vauxonne qualify.)	FC Reneins Vauxonne (10)
193.	FC Bord de Veyle (10)	2–2 (4–5 p)	ES Foissiat-Étrez (9)
194.	Ambérieu FC (10)	6–0	FC Serrières-Villebois (11)
195.	ACS Mayotte du Rhône (12)	1–1 (2–3 p)	US Cheminots Lyon Vaise (11)
196.	US Villette-d'Anthon-Janneyrais (11)	4–3	FC Sud Ouest 69 (10)
197.	US Vaulx-en-Velin (11)	8–3	US Côteaux Lyonnais (11)
198.	FC Denicé Arnas (10)	0–3	FC Sainte-Foy-lès-Lyon (11)
199.	Éveil de Lyon (10)	4–1	FC La Giraudière (11)
200.	FC Meys-Grézieu (10)	4–2	AS Grosne (11)
201.	Belleville Football Beaujolais (10)	5–2	US Des Monts (11)
202.	FC Franchevillois (11)	5–2	FC Saint-Cyr Ampuis (11)
203.	AS Sornins Réunis (11)	0–3	FC Mont Brouilly (9)
204.	Sud Azergues Foot (10)	1–1 (3–4 p)	AS Grézieu-la-Varenne (11)
205.	FC Point du Jour (10)	5–2	US Est Lyonnais (11)
206.	Isle d'Abeau FC (12)	6–1	Caluire SC (10)
207.	FC Sévenne (11)	1–3	US Sassenage (9)
208.	AS Cessieu (13)	0–3	Football Côte Saint-André (9)
209.	CS Vaulxois (11)	2–1	SC Portes de l'Ain (11)
210.	AS Brignais (10)	3–0	AS Vézeronce-Huert (10)
211.	AS Diémoz (10)	1–3	US Creys-Morestel (10)
212.	Mions FC (10)	4–4 (4–3 p) (Note: Mions FC penalised for fielding a suspended player, US Corbelin qualify.)	US Corbelin (10)
213.	FC Mas-Rillier (11)	1–5	GS Chasse (10)
214.	AS Écully (11)	1–0	Fareins Saône Vallée Foot (11)
215.	Olympic Sathonay Foot (11)	1–3	AS Saint-Forgeux (10)
216.	AS Guéreins-Genouilleux (10)	5–2	Bresse Foot 01 (10)
217.	Olympique Buyatin (11)	1–3	ÉS Liergues (9)
218.	FO Bourg-en-Bresse (12)	0–3	Olympique Sud Revermont 01 (9)
219.	Olympique Nord Dauphiné (11)	1–4	AS Portugaise Vaulx-en-Velin (10)
220.	FC Montluel (12)	5–2	US Nantua (10)
221.	FC Lyon Croix-Rousse (10)	6–0	FC Priay (11)
222.	FC Curtafond-Confrançon-Saint-Martin-Saint-Didier (11)	2–0	Olympique Rives de l'Ain-Pays du Cerdon (9)
223.	AS Chaveyriat-Chanoz (12)	0–3	US Arbent Marchon (10)
224.	Association des Portugais d'Oyonnax (12)	0–4	Entente Saint-Martin-du-Frêne/Maillat/Combe du Val (11)
225.	Eyzin-Saint-Sorlin FC (12)	0–7	AS Bellecour-Perrache (10)
226.	Saône Franc Lyonnais (11)	7–0	Beaujolais Football (10)
227.	SC Mille Étangs (12)	0–7	Olympique Villefontaine (9)
228.	ES Ambronay-Saint-Jean-le-Vieux (12)	0–9	Olympique Saint-Denis-lès-Bourg (10)
229.	US Reventin (11)	3–3 (3–4 p)	Saône Mont d'Or FC (10)
230.	SC Revolée (10)	1–1 (2–4 p)	Latino AFC Lyon (10)
231.	Chaleyssin-Valencin-Luxinay 38 FC (11)	3–1	Association Chandieu-Heyrieux (10)
232.	OS Beaujolais (11)	0–2	Entente AS Saint-Pierre-la-Palud / FC Savigny (10)
233.	FC des Collines (12)	0–9	Artas Charantonnay FC (11)
234.	ES Frontonas-Chamagnieu (11)	2–3	Villeurbanne United FC (12)
235.	ACC Franco Turc Bourg-en-Bresse (11)	2–3	US Replonges (10)
236.	AS Grièges Pont de Veyle (12)	0–4	FC Manziat (10)
237.	AS Dortan Lavancia (13)	1–5	AS Izernore Nurieux-Volognat (10)
238.	US Veyziat (11)	1–2	Plaine Revermont Foot (11)
239.	ISN FC Chaneins (12)	0–0 (3–4 p)	Lyon Ouest SC (11)
240.	AS Saint-Étienne-sur-Chalaronne (12)	0–2	US Plaine de l'Ain (10)
241.	US Montgasconnaise (12)	0–5	Vallée du Guiers FC (10)
242.	Vourey Sports (12)	0–6	FC Vallée de la Gresse (9)
243.	Deux Rochers FC (11)	4–2	Le Grand-Lemps/Colombe/Apprieu Foot 38 (10)
244.	Amicale Tunisienne Saint-Martin-d'Hères (12)	6–1	US Abbaye (11)
245.	AS Vertrieu (12)	0–10	ES Saint-Priest (10)
246.	Olympique Les Avenières (12)	1–3	FC La Sure (10)
247.	FC Canton de Vinay (13)	0–3	USÉ Antonine (12)
248.	FC Bilieu (12)	0–2	Beaucroissant FC (10)
249.	CS Miribel (12)	0–1	Rives SF (10)
250.	ASJF Domène (12)	1–5	FC Sud Isère (11)
251.	Noyarey FC (11)	5–0	US Jarrie-Champ (10)
252.	ES Izeaux (13) (Note: ES Izeaux replaced CS Voreppe in the draw.)	2–4	AS Ver Sau (11)
253.	CS 4 Routes (11)	2–4	AS Saint-André-le-Gaz (9)
254.	CA Goncelin (12)	0–1	FC Mahorais Grenoble (12)
255.	US Beauvoir-Royas (13)	0–2	AS Saint-Joseph-de-Rivière (12)
256.	US Cassolards Passageois (12)	2–0	AS Tullins-Fures (10)
257.	UO Portugal Saint-Martin-d'Hères (12)	3–1	FC Versoud (11)
258.	AS Crossey (11)	0–2	AS Italienne Européenne Grenoble (10)
259.	FC Saint-Martin-d'Uriage (12)	2–0	Claix Football (11)
260.	US Village Olympique Grenoble (10)	1–4 (Note: US Gières penalised for fielding an ineligible player, US Village Olympique Grenoble qualify.)	US Gières (9)
261.	MJC Saint-Hilaire-de-la-Côte (12)	0–2	Union Nord Iséroise Foot (11)
262.	FC Vallée de l'Hien (11)	0–0 (2–4 p)	US Dolomoise (10)
263.	AC Poisat (13)	0–0 (1–4 p)	JS Saint-Georgeoise (10)
264.	AS Cheyssieu (13)	0–9	ASL Saint-Cassien (10)
265.	US Le Bouchage-Passins (12)	0–6	FC Balmes Nord-Isère (11)
266.	EF des Étangs (11)	1–0	FC Turcs Verpillière (11)
267.	CS Faramans (11)	3–2	FC Chirens (11)
268.	Eclose Châteauvilain Badinières Football (11)	4–1	AS Saint-Lattier (11)
269.	AS Grésivaudan (12)	0–7	AJA Villeneuve (9)
270.	Chazay FC (11)	2–0 (Note: FC Ternay penalised for fielding an ineligible player, Chazay FC qualify.)	FC Ternay (11)
271.	AS Bâgé-le-Châtel (11)	1–5	Jassans-Frans Foot (9)
272.	FC Artemare (12)	1–6	Valserhône FC (9)
273.	US Vaux-en-Bugey (10)	0–10	FC Côtière-Luenaz (9)
274.	CS Belley (9)	1–2	AS Travailleurs Turcs Oyonnax (9)
275.	US Culoz Grand Colombier (10)	2–1	CA Yennne (10)
276.	Chambéry Sport 73 (11)	6–0	US Domessin (11)
277.	FC Saint-Michel Sports (11)	0–1	FC Laissaud (9)
278.	US Modane (11)	1–2	FC Villargondran (10)
279.	AS Mont Jovet Bozel (11)	3–1	FC Haute Tarentaise (9)
280.	FC Apremont (11)	0–4	CA Maurienne (10)
281.	Nivolet FC (10)	3–1	UO Albertville (9)
282.	Cœur de Savoie (11)	2–5	AS Cuines-La Chambre Val d'Arc (10)
283.	AS Novalaise (11)	3–1	Saint-Pierre SF (9)
284.	FC Montagny (12)	1–3	AS Haute Combe de Savoie (12)
285.	Challes SF (11)	4–1	AS Ugine (10)
286.	FC des Bauges (11)	2–5	USC Aiguebelle (9)
287.	FC Haut de Chambéry (11) (Note: FC Haut de Chambéry replaced AS Barberaz in the draw.)	2–1	US Argonay (9)
288.	AS Lac Bleu (10)	2–2 (4–2 p)	US Grand Mont La Bâthie (10)
289.	Olympique Cran (12)	2–3	US La Ravoire (10)
290.	ES Lanfonnet (11)	1–3	Entente Val d'Hyères (9)
291.	FC Saint-Baldoph (11)	2–2 (7–6 p)	AS Portugais Annecy (12)
292.	ES Meythet (11)	2–3	Cognin Sports (9)
293.	FC Chéran (11)	0–1	US Chartreuse Guiers (9)
294.	US Grignon (11)	5–0	FC Aravis (12)
295.	FC Vuache (12)	1–3	AS Genevois (10)
296.	AS Thonon (11)	2–0	US Vétraz-Monthoux (10)
297.	AS Parmelan Villaz (12)	0–5	ES Fillinges (10)
298.	FC Les Houches-Servoz (12)	1–2	CS Ayze (9)
299.	US Magland (13)	0–0 (Note: US Mont Blanc originally won the match after a penalty shootout, but were penalised for fielding an ineligible player. US Magland qualify.)	US Mont Blanc (10)
300.	US Vougy (12)	2–9	ES Amancy Cornier (10)
301.	AJ Anthy Margencel (12)	2–3	FRS Champanges (11)
302.	FC Semine (11)	0–0 (4–3 p)	Foot Sud Gessien (11)
303.	Pays de Gex FC (10)	0–0 (5–4 p)	ES Cernex (9)
304.	Haut Giffre FC (11)	0–3	CS Amphion Publier (9)
305.	AJ Ville-la-Grand (11)	0–6	ES Douvaine-Loisin (9)
306.	FC Cruseilles (10)	1–1 (2–4 p)	AG Bons-en-Chablais (9)
307.	FC Saint-Cergues (12)	1–7	US Annemasse-Ambilly-Gaillard (9)
308.	Échenevex-Ségny-Chevry Olympique (11)	1–5	FC Frangy (11)
309.	JS Reignier (10)	1–3	FC Ballaison (9)
310.	Bonne AC (12)	0–2	FC La Filière (10)
311.	ES Valleiry (10)	3–3 (1–3 p)	SS Allinges (9)
312.	AS Épagny-Metz-Tessy (12)	0–5	FC Cranves-Sales (10)
313.	AS Évires (11)	1–3	Union Salève Foot (11)
314.	AS Marin (12)	0–1	FC Leman Presqu'île (11)
315.	CS Veigy-Foncenex (11)	1–6	CS Saint-Pierre (10)
316.	US Pers-Jussy (11)	1–6	CSA Poisy (10)
317.	AS Prévessin-Moëns (11)	2–1	ES Saint-Jeoire-La Tour (10)
318.	FC Marigny (12)	1–4	AS Portugais Faverges (10)
319.	FC Thônes (11)	1– (2–3 p)	CO Chavanod (9)
320.	FC Des Salèves (13)	0–4	AS Le Lyaud-Armoy (10)
321.	Foot Sud 74 (12)	0–4	Marignier Sports (10)
322.	FC Villy-le-Pelloux (12)	1–3	ES Thyez (10)

== Second round ==
These matches were played between 31 August and 1 September 2024, with one delayed until 8 September 2024 after a league investigation into a first round match.

Second Round Results: Auvergne-Rhône-Alpes
Tie no	Home team (Tier)	Score	Away team (Tier)
1.	US Cère et Landes (11)	1–2	US Vallée de l'Authre (7)
2.	Ydes SFC (11)	4–1	Ytrac Foot (8)
3.	AS Vebret-Antignac (11)	0–7	AS Pleaux-Rilhac-Barriac (9)
4.	AS Belbexoise (9)	2–2 (5–4 p)	US Saint-Flour (7)
5.	US Bassin Minier (9)	3–1	FC Massiac-Molompize-Blesle (9)
6.	ES Saint-Mamet (10)	0–4	FC Junhac-Montsalvy (9)
7.	US de la Cère (11)	1–2	Entente Nord Lozère (7)
8.	US Loupiac Saint-Christophe (12)	0–5	FC Ally Mauriac (8)
9.	AS Yolet (10)	1–8	AS Espinat (9)
10.	FC Moussages (10)	2–3	ES Riomois-Condat (9)
11.	Espérance Vieille-Brioude (11)	1–2	US Murat (8)
12.	Saint-Georges SL (10)	3–0 (Note: Tie reversed from original draw.) (Note: Tie won by means of forfeit.)	AS Naucelles (11)
13.	FC Artense (10)	2–5	Football en Châtaigneraie Pays de Rance (7)
14.	CS Arpajonnais (9)	1–6	Sporting Châtaigneraie Cantal (7)
15.	FC des Quatre Vallées (10)	0–2	AS Sansacoise (8)
16.	AS Neussargues (11)	1–2	Sud Cantal Foot (8)
17.	Vigilante Saint-Pal-de-Mons (10)	0–0 (5–6 p)	AS St Didier St Just (9)
18.	AS Villeneuve-d'Alier Saint-Ilpize (12)	1–7	AS Laussonne (10)
19.	FC Arzon (10)	3–5	Association Vergongheon-Arvant (8)
20.	US Lantriac (11)	0–3	AS Emblavez-Vorey (9)
21.	AS Saugues (10)	2–3	AS Chadrac (8)
22.	US Vals Le Puy (9)	1–1 (9–10 p)	US Montfaucon Montregard Raucoules (10)
23.	AS Grazac-Lapte (9)	5–2	Seauve Sports (8)
24.	AG Sainte-Sigolène (10)	2–1	SC Langogne (8)
25.	FC Dunières (10)	0–0 (3–4 p)	FC Saint-Germain-Laprade (9)
26.	AS Cheminots Langeac (9)	0–4	Sauveteurs Brivois (8)
27.	US Bassoise (11)	0–4	US Fontannoise (9)
28.	FJEP Freycenets Saint-Jeures (10)	2–2 (3–4 p)	Olympic Saint-Julien-Chapteuil (8)
29.	Olympique Retournac Beauzac (9)	1–8	US Sucs et Lignon (7)
30.	AS Néris (11)	2–10	US Lignerolles-Lavault Sainte-Anne Prémilhat (9)
31.	US Biachette Désertines (10)	2–2 (4–2 p)	Bourbon Sportif (7)
32.	AS Neuilly-le-Réal (10)	0–2	AA Lapalisse (7)
33.	SC Avermes (9)	4–0	CS Vaux-Estivareilles (9)
34.	AS Val de Sioule (10)	1–1 (3–4 p)	AS Moulins (7)
35.	US Saint-Georges / Les Ancizes (11)	0–6	RC Vichy (7)
36.	JS Saint-Priest-des-Champs (9)	0–3	Commentry FC (8)
37.	ES Arfeuilles (12)	0–4	Stade Saint-Yorre (9)
38.	US Lusigny (11)	2–1	AS Cheminots Saint-Germain (9)
39.	Espoir Molinetois (10)	1–4	US Vallon (9)
40.	AS Tronget (10)	2–4	Bézenet-Doyet Foot (8)
41.	US Saint-Victor (10)	5–4	CS Cosne d'Allier (9)
42.	FC Haut d'Allier (10)	2–0	AS Varennes-sur-Allier (8)
43.	ES Montagne Bourbonnaise (10)	1–0	US Vendat Bellerive Brugheas (8)
44.	OC Monetay-sur-Allier (11)	2–1	US Coeur Allier (10)
45.	US Bien-Assis (10)	4–2	AL Quinssaines (8)
46.	FC Le Vivre Ensemble (12)	1–4	AS Dompierroise (8)
47.	US Chevagnes (10)	0–3	SCA Cussét (8)
48.	Ballon Beaulonnais (11)	3–1	Entente Mercy-Chapeau Montbeugny (12)
49.	FC Souvigny (9)	1–1 (5–3 p)	AS Louchy (10)
50.	US Trezelles (10)	5–1	AS Chassenard Luneau (11)
51.	FC Ébreuil (11)	0–4	FC Billy-Crechy (10)
52.	Étoile Moulins Yzeure (9)	2–2 (2–4 p)	AS Nord Vignoble (9)
53.	CS Saint-Anthème (12)	3–2	Ecureuils Franc Rosier (8)
54.	FC Nord Limagne (10)	1–0	Dômes-Sancy Foot (8)
55.	Sancy Artense Foot (11)	2–5	FC Martres-Lussat (9)
56.	FC Bromont-Lamothe/Montfermy (10)	1–5	EFC Saint-Amant-Tallende (8)
57.	US Maringues (9)	0–1	CS Volvic (7)
58.	ES Saint-Germinoise (10)	2–5	CS Pont-du-Château (8)
59.	AS Clermont Toutes Nationalités (12)	0–0 (3–5 p)	FC Mezel (9)
60.	US Saint-Gervaisienne (10)	3–13	US Mozac (7)
61.	AS Roche-Blanche FC (10)	2–3	CS Saint-Bonnet-près-Riom (9)
62.	AS Royat (9)	1–3	AS Saint-Jacques (7)
63.	Clermont Métropole FC (9)	7–3	RC Charbonnières-Paugnat (9)
64.	FF Chappes (10)	4–2	US Saint-Beauzire (8)
65.	US Limons (10)	2–3	US Orcet (9)
66.	UJ Clermontoise (9)	1–1 (6–5 p)	US Vic-le-Comte (8)
67.	FC Aubierois (9)	0–1	US Beaumontoise (7)
68.	AS Montferrand Football (none)	3–0	Cébazat Sports (9)
69.	AS Romagnat (9)	0–7	FA Le Cendre (7)
70.	Aulnat Sportif (9)	1–1 (5–4 p)	Ambert Livradois Sud (8)
71.	Clermont Ouvoimoja (9)	1–1 (4–5 p)	FC Châtel-Guyon (7)
72.	FC Blanzat (9)	0–3	AS Saint-Genès-Champanelle (8)
73.	AS Moissat (9)	1–15	Espérance Ceyratois Football (7)
74.	RS Luzillat-Charnat-Vinzelles (9)	0–6	Lempdes Sport (7)
75.	US Courpière (9)	1–4	FC Cournon-d'Auvergne (7)
76.	Portugal FC Clermont Aubière (10)	0–3	US Issoire (7)
77.	AS Orcines (9)	4–3	US Ennezat (9)
78.	Pérignat FC (12)	0–7	US Les Martres-de-Veyre (9)
79.	Saint-Amant et Tallende SC (11)	2–0	AS Enval-Marsat (9)
80.	SC Billom (10)	0–4	FC Lezoux (9)
81.	AC Allet (11)	2–0	AS Cornas (10)
82.	ES Nord Drôme (11)	1–2	Rhône Crussol Foot 07 (9)
83.	AS Cancoise (11)	4–2	ES Boulieu-lès-Annonay (10)
84.	AS Homenetmen Bourg-lès Valence (11)	2–5	RC Tournon-Tain (10)
85.	FC Colombier Saint-Barthélemy (11)	0–2	FC Cheylarois (12)
86.	FC Tricastin (11)	1–2	CO Donzère (10)
87.	Olympique Centre Ardèche (10)	0–2	ASF Pierrelatte (8)
88.	Allex-Chabrillan-Eurre FC (12)	0–1	FC Eyrieux Embroye (8)
89.	AS Portugaise Valence (12)	3–3 (3–4 p)	AS Donatienne (9)
90.	ES Malissardoise (11)	2–5	FC Chabeuil (8)
91.	US Ancône (11)	1–1 (3–4 p)	UMS Montélimar (8)
92.	US Val d'Ay (11)	2–2 (2–0 p)	JS Saint-Paul-lès-Romans (11)
93.	Entente Sarras Sports Saint-Vallier (9)	1–2	Olympique Salaise Rhodia (7)
94.	AS Berg-Helvie (10)	2–6	ES Chomérac (9)
95.	FC Montélimar (10)	1–1 (1–4 p)	AS Véore Montoison (8)
96.	SC Bourguésan (12)	1–8	US Saint-Just-Saint-Marcel (9)
97.	FC Larnage-Serves (11)	0–3	US Mours (9)
98.	CO Châteauneuvois (10)	0–4	Valence FC (8)
99.	FC Hauterives US Grand Serre (11)	0–5	FC Péageois (8)
100.	FC Bourguisan (11)	1–1 (5–4 p)	FC Châtelet (10)
101.	FA Le Teil Melas (12)	0–3	AS Sud Ardèche (7)
102.	Diois FC (11)	3–3 (5–4 p)	US Beaufort-Aouste (11)
103.	US Vallée du Jabron (10)	2–1	FC Valdaine (9)
104.	AS Roussas-Granges-Gontardes (11)	2–1	US Pont-La Roche (10)
105.	FC Rambertois (12)	1–3	FC Portois (10)
106.	IF Barbières-Bésayes-Rochefort-Samson-Marches (11)	3–5	US Montélier (11)
107.	FC Clérieux-Saint-Bardoux-Granges-les-Beaumont (12)	2–8	Espérance Hostunoise (8)
108.	FC Rochegudien (11)	2–1	US Bas-Vivarais (10)
109.	US Portes Hautes Cévennes (10)	2–3	US Saint-Martinoise (11)
110.	CO Châteauneuf-du-Rhône (11)	5–1	US Drôme Provence (11)
111.	AAJ Saint-Alban-d'Ay (12)	0–1	US Davézieux-Vidalon (8)
112.	ES Saint-Alban Auriolles-Grospierres (12)	1–3	FC Saint-Didier-sous-Aubenas (11)
113.	AS Saint-Barthélemy-Grozon (12)	0–9	AS Chavanay (7)
114.	AS Vallée du Doux (11)	0–4	ES Beaumonteleger (9)
115.	PS Romanaise (9)	1–6	FC Annonay (8)
116.	US Millery-Vourles (9)	2–1	Football Mont-Pilat (9)
117.	US Abrest (10)	0–10	Roannais Foot 42 (8)
118.	US L'Horme (9)	0–5	AS Saint-Just-Saint-Rambert (8)
119.	AS Saint-Ferréol Gampille Firminy (11)	0–2	SEL Saint-Priest-en-Jarez (8)
120.	USG La Fouillouse (10)	0–1	US Villars (8)
121.	JS Cellieu (10)	3–2	Forez Donzy FC (10)
122.	SS Ussonaise (12)	0–0 (9–10 p)	Lignon FC (9)
123.	Olympique Terrenoire (12)	1–4	FC Saint-Paul-en-Jarez (7)
124.	FC Roanne (12)	0–5 (Note: FC Loire Sornin penalised for fielding a suspended player, FC Roanne qualify.)	FC Loire Sornin (9)
125.	CO La Rivière (10)	1–1 (5–6 p)	Saint-Chamond Foot (8)
126.	FCI Saint-Romain-le-Puy (9)	0–1	L'Étrat-La Tour Sportif (7)
127.	Mably Sport (11)	0–2	ES Veauche (8)
128.	Riorges FC (11)	1–2	US Saint-Galmier-Chambœuf (8)
129.	Olympique Le Coteau (10)	1–3	AF Pays de Coise (8)
130.	FC Montagnes du Matin (10)	2–2 (1–3 p)	FC Roche-Saint-Genest (8)
131.	SC Piraillon (12)	1–1 (1–3 p)	AS Saint-Just-en-Chevalet (11)
132.	FC Commelle-Vernay (11)	1–3	Côte Chaude Sportif (8)
133.	US Bussières (10)	1–0	FC Saint-Étienne (9)
134.	AS Châteauneuf (9)	0–0 (4–3 p)	AS Algérienne Chambon-Feugerolles (8)
135.	ASL Portugais Roanne (10)	0–1	AS Savigneux-Montbrison (7)
136.	FC Marcellinois (12)	2–1	Olympique Est Roannais (10)
137.	Sury SC (12)	1–8	Haut Pilat Interfoot (9)
138.	FC Belette de Saint-Léger (11)	1–0	ES Dyonisienne (11)
139.	ABH FC (10)	3–3 (8–7 p)	Sorbiers-La Talaudière (9)
140.	FC Genilac (12)	0–11	GS Dervaux Chambon-Feugerolles (8)
141.	FC Saint-Joseph-Saint-Martin (11)	1–4	ES Saint-Christo-Marcenod (8)
142.	FC Boisset-Chalain (11)	0–5	Toranche FC (11)
143.	FC Plaine Cleppé/Poncins (11)	0–5	CS Crémeaux (10)
144.	Bellegarde Sports (12)	1–0	AS Saint-Symphorien-de-Lay (11)
145.	ES Champdieu-Marcilly (10)	0–1	GOAL Foot (10)
146.	Olympique Rillieux (9)	0–1	CAS Cheminots Oullins Lyon (8)
147.	Crémieu FC (13)	1–4	Olympique Vaulx-en-Velin (9)
148.	JSO Givors (9)	5–4	Ménival FC (8)
149.	Haute Brévenne Football (9)	2–5	FC Pontcharra-Saint-Loup (8)
150.	Muroise Foot (10)	0–6	CS Neuville (7)
151.	AS Buers Villeurbanne (9)	2–2 (4–1 p)	FC Chaponnay-Marennes (8)
152.	FC Grigny (11)	1–7	FC Gerland Lyon (8)
153.	Saint-Quentin-Fallavier FC (11)	1–2	Sud Lyonnais Foot (7)
154.	CO Saint-Fons (9)	3–1	US Meyzieu (10)
155.	Foot Trois Rivières (11)	1–1 (1–3 p)	Centre Dombes Football (10)
156.	FC Saint-Martin-la-Sauveté (11)	0–5	Stade Amplepuisien (7)
157.	FC Lamure Poule (9)	1–3	AS Craponne (7)
158.	AS Algerienne Villeurbanne (9)	1–1 (3–4 p)	FC Colombier-Satolas (8)
159.	AS Attignat (9)	0–2	FC Bressans (8)
160.	US Ruy Montceau (10)	1–4	FC Varèze (8)
161.	CF Estrablin (9)	2–3	FC Charvieu-Chavagneux (8)
162.	CS Ozon (11)	2–5	AS Domarin (8)
163.	AS Toussieu (11)	2–2 (3–0 p)	Saint-Alban Sportif (11)
164.	FC Reneins Vauxonne (10)	2–5	US Montanay (9)
165.	ES Foissiat-Étrez (9)	2–3	US Feillens (7)
166.	Ambérieu FC (10)	1–6	Bourg Sud (8)
167.	US Cheminots Lyon Vaise (11)	2–1	CS Reyrieux (12)
168.	US Villette-d'Anthon-Janneyrais (11)	1–3	AS Villeurbanne Éveil Lyonnais (8)
169.	US Vaulx-en-Velin (11)	2–3	Feyzin Club Belle Étoile (9)
170.	FC Sainte-Foy-lès-Lyon (11)	1–4	FC Pays de l'Arbresle (8)
171.	Éveil de Lyon (10)	3–0	ES Genas Azieu (9)
172.	FC Meys-Grézieu (10)	4–1	FC Antillais Villeurbanne (11)
173.	Belleville Football Beaujolais (10)	2–5	Olympique Lyon Sud (7)
174.	FC Franchevillois (11)	0–2	CS Meginand (8)
175.	FC Mont Brouilly (9)	0–1	Olympique Belleroche Villefranche (8)
176.	AS Grézieu-la-Varenne (11)	2–3	ES Charly Foot (12)
177.	FC Point du Jour (10)	2–2 (4–5 p)	UGA Lyon-Décines (8)
178.	Isle d'Abeau FC (12)	0–4	AS Misérieux-Trévoux (7)
179.	US Sassenage (9)	1–1 (5–4 p)	US La Murette (8)
180.	Football Côte Saint-André (9)	1–1 (1–4 p)	US Pontoise (8)
181.	CS Vaulxois (11)	0–1	CS Lagnieu (8)
182.	AS Brignais (10)	4–6	AS Pusignan (10)
183.	US Creys-Morestel (10)	2–4	FC La Tour-Saint-Clair (7)
184.	US Corbelin (10)	2–2 (1–3 p)	SO Pont-de-Chéruy-Chavanoz (8)
185.	GS Chasse (10)	2–2 (3–4 p)	FC Lauzes (10)
186.	AS Écully (11)	1–4	Vénissieux FC (7)
187.	AS Saint-Forgeux (10)	1–1 (1–4 p)	Domtac FC (8)
188.	AS Guéreins-Genouilleux (10)	3–1	ES Val de Saône (11)
189.	ÉS Liergues (9)	1–7	FC Dombes-Bresse (8)
190.	Olympique Sud Revermont 01 (9)	1–1 (2–4 p)	CS Viriat (8)
191.	FO Seyssuellois (12)	1–5	AS Portugaise Vaulx-en-Velin (10)
192.	FC Montluel (12)	1–1 (2–4 p)	AS Hautecourt-Romanèche (10)
193.	FC Lyon Croix-Rousse (10)	4–1	MOS Trois Rivières (7)
194.	FC Curtafond-Confrançon-Saint-Martin-Saint-Didier (11)	0–7	ES Bressane Marboz (8)
195.	US Arbent Marchon (10)	6–0	CO Plateau (11)
196.	Entente Saint-Martin-du-Frêne/Maillat/Combe du Val (11)	0–5	AS Montréal-la-Cluse (8)
197.	AS Bellecour-Perrache (10)	2–3	AS Saint-Martin-en-Haut (8)
198.	Saône Franc Lyonnais (11)	5–1	CS Chevroux (12)
199.	Olympique Villefontaine (9)	1–0	FC Seyssins (8)
200.	CSJ Châtillonnaise (12)	2–3	Olympique Saint-Denis-lès-Bourg (10)
201.	Saône Mont d'Or FC (10)	1–1 (5–6 p)	ÉS Trinité Lyon (8)
202.	Latino AFC Lyon (10)	1–4	AS Montchat Lyon (7)
203.	Chaleyssin-Valencin-Luxinay 38 FC (11)	2–3	FC Pays Voironnais (9)
204.	Entente AS Saint-Pierre-la-Palud / FC Savigny (10)	0–1	SC Ouest Lyonnais (7)
205.	Artas Charantonnay FC (11)	3–2	US Thodure (10)
206.	Villeurbanne United FC (12)	2–10	FC Lyon (7)
207.	US Replonges (10)	1–2	FC Plaine Tonique (8)
208.	FC Manziat (10)	1–9	FC Veyle Sâone (8)
209.	AS Izernore Nurieux-Volognat (10)	1–1 (7–6 p)	ES Revermontoise (8)
210.	Plaine Revermont Foot (11)	1–1 (5–6 p)	US Plaine de l'Ain (10)
211.	Lyon Ouest SC (11)	4–0	FC Ternay (11)
212.	Vallée du Guiers FC (10)	1–3	Formafoot Bièvre Valloire (10)
213.	US Saint-Paul-de-Varces (11)	1–6	FC Vallée de la Gresse (9)
214.	Deux Rochers FC (11)	1–2	Saint-Martin-d'Hères FC (9)
215.	Amicale Tunisienne Saint-Martin-d'Hères (12)	4–1	FC Liers (11)
216.	ES Saint-Priest (10)	0–2	FC La Sure (10)
217.	USÉ Antonine (12)	1–9	FC Allobroges Asafia (7)
218.	Beaucroissant FC (10)	4–4 (2–4 p)	FC Crolles-Bernin (8)
219.	Rives SF (10)	1–2	Olympique Saint-Marcellin (8)
220.	FC Sud Isère (11)	1–4	ES Rachais (7)
221.	AS Ver Sau (11)	1–4	Noyarey FC (11)
222.	AS Saint-Joseph-de-Rivière (12)	1–2	AS Saint-André-le-Gaz (9)
223.	FC Mahorais Grenoble (12)	5–4	UO Portugal Saint-Martin-d'Hères (12)
224.	US Cassolards Passageois (12)	1–1 (4–2 p)	FC Saint-Martin-d'Uriage (12)
225.	AS Italienne Européenne Grenoble (10)	0–0 (1–2 p)	US Village Olympique Grenoble (10)
226.	Union Nord Iséroise Foot (11)	4–3	FC Balmes Nord-Isère (11)
227.	US Dolomoise (10)	2–1	JS Saint-Georgeoise (10)
228.	ASL Saint-Cassien (10)	8–2	EF des Étangs (11)
229.	AJA Villeneuve (9)	1–0	ES Manival (7)
230.	CS Faramans (11)	0–6	FC Échirolles (7)
231.	Eclose Châteauvilain Badinières Football (11)	0–5	OC Eybens (7)
232.	Jassans-Frans Foot (9)	2–3	AS Travailleurs Turcs Oyonnax (9)
233.	Valserhône FC (9)	2–2 (3–4 p)	FC Côtière-Luenaz (9)
234.	FC Carroz d’Arâches (13)	1–4	FC Combloux-Megève (11)
235.	FC Gavot (12)	0–5	CA Bonnevillois 1921 (11)
236.	SC Morzine Vallée d'Aulps (10)	1–2	FC Cluses (8)
237.	CO Chavanod (9)	0–1	ES Thyez (10)
238.	AS Portugais Faverges (10)	2–1	Marignier Sports (10)
239.	CS Saint-Pierre (10)	0–4	CSA Poisy (10)
240.	FC Leman Presqu'île (11)	1–0	AS Le Lyaud-Armoy (10)
241.	Union Salève Foot (11)	0–3	AS Prévessin-Moëns (11)
242.	FC Cranves-Sales (10)	1–1 (5–4 p)	FC La Filière (10)
243.	SS Allinges (9)	2–1	ES Chilly (7)
244.	FC Frangy (11)	2–2 (3–5 p)	FC Ballaison (9)
245.	ES Douvaine-Loisin (9)	3–1	AG Bons-en-Chablais (9)
246.	CS Amphion Publier (9)	2–7	FC Foron (7)
247.	FRS Champanges (11)	2–1	FC Semine (11)
248.	US Magland (13)	1–3	ES Fillinges (10)
249.	US Annemasse-Ambilly-Gaillard (9)	0–3	Aix-les-Bains FC (7)
250.	Pays de Gex FC (10)	1–1 (6–5 p)	US Motteraine (8)
251.	ES Amancy Cornier (10)	2–3	ES Seynod (8)
252.	AS Thonon (11)	1–4	US Annecy-le-Vieux (7)
253.	CS Ayze (9)	1–1 (4–3 p)	US Divonne (8)
254.	AS La Bridoire (12)	3–3 (3–4 p)	US Chartreuse Guiers (9)
255.	FC Saint-Baldoph (11)	1–4	US Pringy (8)
256.	Cognin Sports (9)	2–1	AS Sillingy (8)
257.	US Grignon (11)	0–5	ASC Sallanches (9)
258.	US Challex (12)	1–1 (3–5 p)	AS Genevois (10)
259.	Entente Val d'Hyères (9)	1–1 (1–3 p)	FC Chambotte (7)
260.	US La Ravoire (10)	1–1 (9–8 p)	AS Lac Bleu (10)
261.	FC Haut de Chambéry (11)	3–3 (3–5 p)	FC Belle Étoile Mercury (8)
262.	USC Aiguebelle (9)	3–1	ES Drumettaz-Mouxy (8)
263.	AS Haute Combe de Savoie (12)	1–1 (5–4 p)	Challes SF (11)
264.	AS Novalaise (11)	1–3	EF Chautagne (10)
265.	AS Cuines-La Chambre Val d'Arc (10)	2–2 (6–5 p)	ÉS Bourget-du-Lac (11)
266.	CA Maurienne (10)	0–4	JS Chambéry (8)
267.	AS Mont Jovet Bozel (11)	1–5	ES Tarentaise (8)
268.	FC Villargondran (10)	2–2 (4–5 p)	Nivolet FC (10)
269.	FC Laissaud (9)	1–4	US Semnoz-Vieugy (8)
270.	Chambéry Sport 73 (11)	0–3	Montmélian AF (9)
271.	US Culoz Grand Colombier (10)	7–0	CS La Balme-de-Sillingy (10)

== Third round ==
These matches were played on 14 and 15 September 2024.

Third Round Results: Auvergne-Rhône-Alpes
Tie no	Home team (Tier)	Score	Away team (Tier)
1.	US Orcet (9)	1–0	Saint-Georges SL (10)
2.	FC Junhac-Montsalvy (9)	2–0	Sud Cantal Foot (8)
3.	FC Espaly (5)	2–0	Velay FC (6)
4.	Sporting Châtaigneraie Cantal (7)	1–2	US Murat (8)
5.	AS Espinat (9)	4–0	AS Pleaux-Rilhac-Barriac (9)
6.	FC Ally Mauriac (8)	2–3	EFC Saint-Amant-Tallende (8)
7.	AS Sansacoise (8)	1–2	AS Belbexoise (9)
8.	US Fontannoise (9)	0–1	US Issoire (7)
9.	Football en Châtaigneraie Pays de Rance (7)	0–1	Aurillac FC (6)
10.	Ydes SFC (11)	0–1	US Vallée de l'Authre (7)
11.	ES Riomois-Condat (9)	0–3	Entente Nord Lozère (7)
12.	FC Lezoux (9)	0–7	FC Chamalières (5)
13.	FC Billy-Crechy (10)	2–0	AS Saint-Genès-Champanelle (8)
14.	US Les Martres-de-Veyre (9)	1–2	AS Montferrand Football (none)
15.	CS Saint-Bonnet-près-Riom (9)	1–5	SA Thiers (6)
16.	Saint-Amant et Tallende SC (11)	0–0 (3–5 p)	FC Mezel (9)
17.	AS Orcines (9)	0–4	US Beaumontoise (7)
18.	FC Nord Limagne (10)	2–1	CS Volvic (7)
19.	UJ Clermontoise (9)	0–2	Clermont Métropole FC (9)
20.	US Trezelles (10)	0–2	FC Riom (6)
21.	FF Chappes (10)	1–2	Aulnat Sportif (9)
22.	CS Pont-du-Château (8)	2–1	AS Saint-Jacques (7)
23.	CS Saint-Anthème (12)	1–6	Lempdes Sport (7)
24.	FC Roanne (12)	2–8	AS Moulins (7)
25.	AS Nord Vignoble (9)	1–3	Stade Saint-Yorre (9)
26.	FC Châtel-Guyon (7)	0–2	Moulins Yzeure Foot (5)
27.	US Lusigny (11)	1–2	US Bien-Assis (10)
28.	US Vallon (9)	1–5	AS Domérat (6)
29.	US Lignerolles-Lavault Sainte-Anne Prémilhat (9)	2–1	ES Montagne Bourbonnaise (10)
30.	Ballon Beaulonnais (11)	1–5	US Mozac (7)
31.	OC Monetay-sur-Allier (11)	1–0	Commentry FC (8)
32.	AS Dompierroise (8)	2–1	SC Avermes (9)
33.	Bézenet-Doyet Foot (8)	3–0	SCA Cussét (8)
34.	US Saint-Victor (10)	0–3	Montluçon Football (6)
35.	FC Souvigny (9)	3–2	AA Lapalisse (7)
36.	FC Haut d'Allier (10)	1–2	Roannais Foot 42 (8)
37.	US Biachette Désertines (10)	0–8	RC Vichy (7)
38.	FC Roche-Saint-Genest (8)	1–0	FC Saint-Germain-Laprade (9)
39.	AS Laussonne (10)	0–8	US Monistrol (6)
40.	AS Saint-Just-Saint-Rambert (8)	2–0	US Blavozy (6)
41.	SEL Saint-Priest-en-Jarez (8)	3–1	AS St Didier St Just (9)
42.	AS Emblavez-Vorey (9)	0–3	FA Le Cendre (7)
43.	Côte Chaude Sportif (8)	1–1 (3–4 p)	US Brioude (6)
44.	Olympic Saint-Julien-Chapteuil (8)	4–5	FC Martres-Lussat (9)
45.	US Villars (8)	1–2	FC Cournon-d'Auvergne (7)
46.	AG Sainte-Sigolène (10)	1–0	Association Vergongheon-Arvant (8)
47.	US Bassin Minier (9)	0–5	US Sucs et Lignon (7)
48.	AS Chadrac (8)	5–2	AS Grazac-Lapte (9)
49.	US Montfaucon Montregard Raucoules (10)	2–2 (3–4 p)	Sauveteurs Brivois (8)
50.	Espérance Ceyratois Football (7)	0–1	Hauts Lyonnais (5)
51.	FC Saint-Didier-sous-Aubenas (11)	0–4	CO Donzère (10)
52.	ÉS Trinité Lyon (8)	1–3	Entente Crest-Aouste (6)
53.	FC Portois (10)	1–1 (3–2 p)	US Val d'Ay (11)
54.	AS Cancoise (11)	1–5	AS Sud Ardèche (7)
55.	Rhône Crussol Foot 07 (9)	1–2	FC Varèze (8)
56.	US Saint-Just-Saint-Marcel (9)	2–2 (3–4 p)	AS Chavanay (7)
57.	FC Cheylarois (12)	0–5	ASF Pierrelatte (8)
58.	US Vallée du Jabron (10)	2–2 (4–3 p)	CAS Cheminots Oullins Lyon (8)
59.	AS Véore Montoison (8)	2–4	Olympique Salaise Rhodia (7)
60.	UMS Montélimar (8)	0–3	FC Vaulx-en-Velin (6)
61.	US Davézieux-Vidalon (8)	0–3	Chassieu Décines FC (5)
62.	FC Rochegudien (11)	0–1	ES Chomérac (9)
63.	RC Tournon-Tain (10)	1–1 (3–4 p)	US Mours (9)
64.	US Saint-Martinoise (11)	0–7	Olympique Lyon Sud (7)
65.	AS Roussas-Granges-Gontardes (11)	1–7	ES Beaumonteleger (9)
66.	Bellegarde Sports (12)	0–1	CS Crémeaux (10)
67.	FC Marcellinois (12)	0–3	FC Chabeuil (8)
68.	FC Bourguisan (11)	0–4	Domtac FC (8)
69.	ABH FC (10)	0–6	L'Étrat-La Tour Sportif (7)
70.	AC Allet (11)	0–7	Lyon La Duchère (5)
71.	US Saint-Galmier-Chambœuf (8)	1–1 (2–4 p)	US Feurs (6)
72.	Toranche FC (11)	3–1	CO Châteauneuf-du-Rhône (11)
73.	JS Cellieu (10)	2–0	FC Belette de Saint-Léger (11)
74.	ES Saint-Christo-Marcenod (8)	2–2 (4–5 p)	AS Saint-Martin-en-Haut (8)
75.	Lignon FC (9)	1–1 (4–5 p)	US Bussières (10)
76.	JSO Givors (9)	3–3 (4–2 p)	CS Neuville (7)
77.	GOAL Foot (10)	1–3	FC Saint-Paul-en-Jarez (7)
78.	FC Belle Étoile Mercury (8)	0–6	Olympique de Valence (6)
79.	US Montélier (11)	1–4	AS Savigneux-Montbrison (7)
80.	ES Veauche (8)	1–3	Saint-Chamond Foot (8)
81.	AS Saint-Just-en-Chevalet (11)	2–2 (5–4 p)	AF Pays de Coise (8)
82.	Espérance Hostunoise (8)	0–3	FC Saint-Cyr Collonges au Mont d'Or (6)
83.	FC Lyon (7)	1–1 (4–2 p)	FC Gerland Lyon (8)
84.	Olympique Villefontaine (9)	3–0	FC Lyon Croix-Rousse (10)
85.	Valence FC (8)	4–1	ES Rachais (7)
86.	Diois FC (11)	0–7	FC Limonest Dardilly Saint-Didier (5)
87.	Éveil de Lyon (10)	3–2	FC Rhône Vallées (6)
88.	AS Portugaise Vaulx-en-Velin (10)	1–2	GS Dervaux Chambon-Feugerolles (8)
89.	FC Meys-Grézieu (10)	3–3 (2–4 p)	Sud Lyonnais Foot (7)
90.	UGA Lyon-Décines (8)	1–1 (2–4 p)	FC Annonay (8)
91.	Haut Pilat Interfoot (9)	2–2 (6–5 p)	FC Échirolles (7)
92.	AS Donatienne (9)	4–0	US Sassenage (9)
93.	FC Eyrieux Embroye (8)	0–0 (3–5 p)	US Millery-Vourles (9)
94.	CO Saint-Fons (9)	0–1	FC Allobroges Asafia (7)
95.	FC Lauzes (10)	1–3	FC Bourgoin-Jallieu (5)
96.	FC Vallée de la Gresse (9)	1–2	AS Buers Villeurbanne (9)
97.	AS Villeurbanne Éveil Lyonnais (8)	1–2	Sporting Nord-Isère (6)
98.	Noyarey FC (11)	0–6	SO Pont-de-Chéruy-Chavanoz (8)
99.	Saint-Martin-d'Hères FC (9)	1–2	FC Pontcharra-Saint-Loup (8)
100.	FC La Sure (10)	0–0 (8–7 p)	Olympique Saint-Marcellin (8)
101.	Formafoot Bièvre Valloire (10)	5–0	AS Toussieu (11)
102.	FC Péageois (8)	3–0	FC Crolles-Bernin (8)
103.	US Dolomoise (10)	1–3	AJA Villeneuve (9)
104.	FC Mahorais Grenoble (12)	1–1 (10–9 p)	ASL Saint-Cassien (10)
105.	US Village Olympique Grenoble (10)	3–1	FC Pays de l'Arbresle (8)
106.	AS Montchat Lyon (7)	2–0	OC Eybens (7)
107.	Union Nord Iséroise Foot (11)	2–5	Amicale Tunisienne Saint-Martin-d'Hères (12)
108.	Artas Charantonnay FC (11)	0–1	Stade Amplepuisien (7)
109.	US Cassolards Passageois (12)	1–6	FCO Firminy-Insersport (6)
110.	FC Côtière-Luenaz (9)	1–1 (2–4 p)	FC Charvieu-Chavagneux (8)
111.	Lyon Ouest SC (11)	0–5	FC Colombier-Satolas (8)
112.	Bourg Sud (8)	0–3	Vénissieux FC (7)
113.	Centre Dombes Football (10)	3–0	Olympique Belleroche Villefranche (8)
114.	AS Izernore Nurieux-Volognat (10)	0–1	SC Ouest Lyonnais (7)
115.	ES Charly Foot (12)	1–1 (4–2 p)	Olympique Saint-Denis-lès-Bourg (10)
116.	US Cheminots Lyon Vaise (11)	0–4	CS Meginand (8)
117.	US Plaine de l'Ain (10)	0–3	FC Veyle Sâone (8)
118.	Saône Franc Lyonnais (11)	1–3	AS Guéreins-Genouilleux (10)
119.	FC Bressans (8)	2–0	US Montanay (9)
120.	AS Pusignan (10)	0–5	AS Misérieux-Trévoux (7)
121.	Olympique Vaulx-en-Velin (9)	2–3	AS Châteauneuf (9)
122.	AS Hautecourt-Romanèche (10)	1–3	Ain Sud (6)
123.	FC Plaine Tonique (8)	0–2	AC Seyssinet (5)
124.	CS Lagnieu (8)	3–3 (2–3 p)	AS Domarin (8)
125.	FC Dombes-Bresse (8)	1–1 (6–5 p)	US Pringy (8)
126.	EF Chautagne (10)	1–1 (8–9 p)	CS Viriat (8)
127.	CSA Poisy (10)	2–1	Montmélian AF (9)
128.	AS Cuines-La Chambre Val d'Arc (10)	1–2	ES Seynod (8)
129.	AS Haute Combe de Savoie (12)	2–10	US Feillens (7)
130.	FC Pays Voironnais (9)	2–0	USC Aiguebelle (9)
131.	ES Tarentaise (8)	7–1	Cognin Sports (9)
132.	US La Ravoire (10)	2–3	AS Portugais Faverges (10)
133.	AS Craponne (7)	2–2 (2–4 p)	Chambéry SF (5)
134.	AS Travailleurs Turcs Oyonnax (9)	3–2	FC Chambotte (7)
135.	AS Saint-André-le-Gaz (9)	3–1	Nivolet FC (10)
136.	FC La Tour-Saint-Clair (7)	1–0	Oyonnax Plastics Vallée FC (6)
137.	AS Genevois (10)	0–1	ES Thyez (10)
138.	FC Leman Presqu'île (11)	1–12	Aix-les-Bains FC (7)
139.	Pays de Gex FC (10)	1–2	ES Bressane Marboz (8)
140.	FRS Champanges (11)	0–2	US Annecy-le-Vieux (7)
141.	FC Ballaison (9)	1–1 (12–11 p)	FC Cranves-Sales (10)
142.	US Arbent Marchon (10)	0–5	JS Chambéry (8)
143.	ES Fillinges (10)	4–3	FC Combloux-Megève (11)
144.	ES Douvaine-Loisin (9)	2–3	Cluses-Scionzier FC (6)
145.	US Chartreuse Guiers (9)	0–3	US Culoz Grand Colombier (10)
146.	CA Bonnevillois 1921 (11)	1–3	US Pontoise (8)
147.	AS Prévessin-Moëns (11)	0–4	ASC Sallanches (9)
148.	SS Allinges (9)	3–2	Thonon Evian Grand Genève FC (5)
149.	AS Montréal-la-Cluse (8)	4–2	US Semnoz-Vieugy (8)
150.	FC Foron (7)	4–1	FC Belle Étoile Mercury (8)
151.	FC Cluses (8)	0–1	CS Ayze (9)

== Fourth round ==
These matches were played on 28 and 29 September 2024.

Fourth Round Results: Auvergne-Rhône-Alpes
Tie no	Home team (Tier)	Score	Away team (Tier)
1.	AS Belbexoise (9)	0–13	FC Riom (6)
2.	US Lignerolles-Lavault Sainte-Anne Prémilhat (9)	1–1 (3–4 p)	US Mozac (7)
3.	EFC Saint-Amant-Tallende (8)	4–3	FC Junhac-Montsalvy (9)
4.	FC Nord Limagne (10)	1–1 (3–5 p)	OC Monetay-sur-Allier (11)
5.	FC Billy-Crechy (10)	1–1 (3–4 p)	US Murat (8)
6.	US Vallée de l'Authre (7)	1–0	FC Chamalières (5)
7.	AS Montferrand Football (none)	2–0	Bézenet-Doyet Foot (8)
8.	FC Souvigny (9)	1–3	Aurillac FC (6)
9.	RC Vichy (7)	1–2	Moulins Yzeure Foot (5)
10.	Entente Nord Lozère (7)	0–8	Le Puy Foot 43 Auvergne (4)
11.	Montluçon Football (6)	1–0	AS Moulins (7)
12.	Stade Saint-Yorre (9)	– (Note: Match abandoned late in the second half, with the scoreline 1–2, after fighting between the players. The league disqualified both teams from the competition.)	AS Dompierroise (8)
13.	US Bien-Assis (10)	0–4	US Issoire (7)
14.	AS Espinat (9)	0–3	AS Domérat (6)
15.	Aulnat Sportif (9)	2–3	SEL Saint-Priest-en-Jarez (8)
16.	FC Martres-Lussat (9)	0–1	FA Le Cendre (7)
17.	AG Sainte-Sigolène (10)	0–1	Lempdes Sport (7)
18.	FC Annonay (8)	0–0 (8–7 p)	Andrézieux-Bouthéon FC (4)
19.	Sauveteurs Brivois (8)	3–1	US Sucs et Lignon (7)
20.	JS Cellieu (10)	0–7	US Monistrol (6)
21.	US Bussières (10)	3–2	Haut Pilat Interfoot (9)
22.	AS Sud Ardèche (7)	1–1 (4–3 p)	SA Thiers (6)
23.	Clermont Métropole FC (9)	3–1	FC Cournon-d'Auvergne (7)
24.	Roannais Foot 42 (8)	3–0	US Orcet (9)
25.	AS Saint-Just-en-Chevalet (11)	0–5	US Beaumontoise (7)
26.	CS Pont-du-Château (8)	0–0 (2–3 p)	Hauts Lyonnais (5)
27.	FC Mezel (9)	1–2	US Brioude (6)
28.	AS Chadrac (8)	0–2	FC Espaly (5)
29.	FC Ballaison (9)	1–0	ES Tarentaise (8)
30.	CS Ayze (9)	0–4	GFA Rumilly-Vallières (4)
31.	US Culoz Grand Colombier (10)	1–4	Cluses-Scionzier FC (6)
32.	CSA Poisy (10)	2–1	FC Lyon (7)
33.	AS Travailleurs Turcs Oyonnax (9)	1–1 (3–4 p)	FC Vaulx-en-Velin (6)
34.	US Pontoise (8)	0–2	Chambéry SF (5)
35.	ASC Sallanches (9)	0–0 (4–2 p)	ES Fillinges (10)
36.	FC Bressans (8)	0–4	FC Foron (7)
37.	US Feillens (7)	0–0 (1–3 p)	Aix-les-Bains FC (7)
38.	ES Bressane Marboz (8)	3–1	JS Chambéry (8)
39.	ES Thyez (10)	1–5	AC Seyssinet (5)
40.	ES Seynod (8)	1–0	FC Dombes-Bresse (8)
41.	CS Viriat (8)	2–2 (4–2 p)	Ain Sud (6)
42.	FC La Sure (10)	1–7	AS Montréal-la-Cluse (8)
43.	FC Colombier-Satolas (8)	3–1	SS Allinges (9)
44.	US Annecy-le-Vieux (7)	1–0	FC Veyle Sâone (8)
45.	AS Portugais Faverges (10)	1–4	AS Misérieux-Trévoux (7)
46.	Amicale Tunisienne Saint-Martin-d'Hères (12)	2–4	AS Savigneux-Montbrison (7)
47.	Chassieu Décines FC (5)	2–5	GOAL FC (4)
48.	FC Portois (10)	1–0	AS Saint-André-le-Gaz (9)
49.	US Mours (9)	1–1 (1–4 p)	Centre Dombes Football (10)
50.	FC Pontcharra-Saint-Loup (8)	1–1 (3–4 p)	FC Saint-Cyr Collonges au Mont d'Or (6)
51.	Vénissieux FC (7)	5–1	Saint-Chamond Foot (8)
52.	US Millery-Vourles (9)	0–5	US Feurs (6)
53.	CS Crémeaux (10)	1–2	FC Pays Voironnais (9)
54.	AS Châteauneuf (9)	0–6	Stade Amplepuisien (7)
55.	US Village Olympique Grenoble (10)	0–1	FCO Firminy-Insersport (6)
56.	GS Dervaux Chambon-Feugerolles (8)	0–6	FC Limonest Dardilly Saint-Didier (5)
57.	Toranche FC (11)	1–3	FC Roche-Saint-Genest (8)
58.	L'Étrat-La Tour Sportif (7)	2–1	FC Saint-Paul-en-Jarez (7)
59.	FC Mahorais Grenoble (12)	1–3	AS Saint-Just-Saint-Rambert (8)
60.	AS Guéreins-Genouilleux (10)	4–1	AS Saint-Martin-en-Haut (8)
61.	AS Buers Villeurbanne (9)	4–3	SC Ouest Lyonnais (7)
62.	FC Allobroges Asafia (7)	5–2	AS Chavanay (7)
63.	US Vallée du Jabron (10)	1–2	Valence FC (8)
64.	CO Donzère (10)	1–0	FC Charvieu-Chavagneux (8)
65.	FC Chabeuil (8)	1–7	FC Bourgoin-Jallieu (5)
66.	Domtac FC (8)	0–4	FC La Tour-Saint-Clair (7)
67.	Formafoot Bièvre Valloire (10)	2–1	FC Péageois (8)
68.	Éveil de Lyon (10)	2–2 (5–6 p)	ASF Pierrelatte (8)
69.	ES Chomérac (9)	1–4	AS Saint-Priest (4)
70.	SO Pont-de-Chéruy-Chavanoz (8)	1–3	Entente Crest-Aouste (6)
71.	Olympique Villefontaine (9)	2–2 (1–3 p)	Olympique de Valence (6)
72.	AJA Villeneuve (9)	2–2 (2–4 p)	Sud Lyonnais Foot (7)
73.	Olympique Lyon Sud (7)	2–1	Olympique Salaise Rhodia (7)
74.	ES Charly Foot (12)	0–5	AS Montchat Lyon (7)
75.	AS Domarin (8)	5–1	Sporting Nord-Isère (6)
76.	FC Varèze (8)	1–1 (4–1 p)	CS Meginand (8)
77.	ES Beaumonteleger (9)	1–1 (4–2 p)	AS Donatienne (9)
78.	JSO Givors (9)	0–6	Lyon La Duchère (5)

== Fifth round ==
These matches were played on 12 and 13 October 2024.

Fifth Round Results: Auvergne-Rhône-Alpes
Tie no	Home team (Tier)	Score	Away team (Tier)
1.	FC Espaly (5)	1–0	Moulins Yzeure Foot (5)
2.	Roannais Foot 42 (8)	3–1	Montluçon Football (6)
3.	US Mozac (7)	4–0	EFC Saint-Amant-Tallende (8)
4.	US Issoire (7)	2–0	US Vallée de l'Authre (7)
5.	Clermont Métropole FC (9)	3–2	US Brioude (6)
6.	AS Montferrand Football (none)	3–0	US Monistrol (6)
7.	US Murat (8)	0–7	GOAL FC (4)
8.	US Beaumontoise (7)	1–1 (1–3 p)	FA Le Cendre (7)
9.	OC Monetay-sur-Allier (11)	1–2	Lempdes Sport (7)
10.	FC Riom (6)	0–2	AS Domérat (6)
11.	Aurillac FC (6)	0–3	Le Puy Foot 43 Auvergne (4)
12.	Sauveteurs Brivois (8)	–	walkover (Note: Due to the disqualification of both Stade Saint-Yorre and AS Dompierroise in the previous round.)
13.	US Bussières (10)	1–5	Valence FC (8)
14.	AS Savigneux-Montbrison (7)	1–1 (5–6 p)	Olympique Lyon Sud (7)
15.	SEL Saint-Priest-en-Jarez (8)	2–5	AS Saint-Priest (4)
16.	AS Saint-Just-Saint-Rambert (8)	3–2	FC La Tour-Saint-Clair (7)
17.	FCO Firminy-Insersport (6)	3–1	AS Misérieux-Trévoux (7)
18.	FC Pays Voironnais (9)	2–1	Entente Crest-Aouste (6)
19.	CO Donzère (10)	0–2	AS Sud Ardèche (7)
20.	FC Annonay (8)	0–6	Football Bourg-en-Bresse Péronnas 01 (3)
21.	FC Roche-Saint-Genest (8)	0–5	Olympique de Valence (6)
22.	ASF Pierrelatte (8)	3–0	ES Beaumonteleger (9)
23.	AS Guéreins-Genouilleux (10)	5–1	FC Portois (10)
24.	US Feurs (6)	2–4	FC Bourgoin-Jallieu (5)
25.	Vénissieux FC (7)	0–1	Hauts Lyonnais (5)
26.	L'Étrat-La Tour Sportif (7)	2–0	FC Limonest Dardilly Saint-Didier (5)
27.	ASC Sallanches (9)	1–0	CSA Poisy (10)
28.	FC Ballaison (9)	0–4	Chambéry SF (5)
29.	AS Montchat Lyon (7)	0–1	FC Colombier-Satolas (8)
30.	Formafoot Bièvre Valloire (10)	0–4	CS Viriat (8)
31.	AS Montréal-la-Cluse (8)	0–2	US Annecy-le-Vieux (7)
32.	Lyon La Duchère (5)	0–4	FC Villefranche Beaujolais (3)
33.	FC Foron (7)	4–1	AS Domarin (8)
34.	FC Varèze (8)	0–4	Cluses-Scionzier FC (6)
35.	AS Buers Villeurbanne (9)	0–0 (5–6 p)	Aix-les-Bains FC (7)
36.	Stade Amplepuisien (7)	1–6	GFA Rumilly-Vallières (4)
37.	Sud Lyonnais Foot (7)	2–2 (7–8 p)	ES Bressane Marboz (8)
38.	Centre Dombes Football (10)	1–5	FC Allobroges Asafia (7)
39.	ES Seynod (8)	2–1	AC Seyssinet (5)
40.	FC Saint-Cyr Collonges au Mont d'Or (6)	1–1 (4–2 p)	FC Vaulx-en-Velin (6)

== Sixth round ==
These matches were played on 26 and 27 October 2024.

Sixth Round Results: Auvergne-Rhône-Alpes
Tie no	Home team (Tier)	Score	Away team (Tier)
1.	Roannais Foot 42 (8)	0–4	Hauts Lyonnais (5)
2.	FA Le Cendre (7)	0–2	AS Montferrand Football (none)
3.	US Mozac (7)	0–2	FC Espaly (5)
4.	Clermont Métropole FC (9)	1–3	Lempdes Sport (7)
5.	Sauveteurs Brivois (8)	1–1 (5–4 p)	FCO Firminy-Insersport (6)
6.	AS Saint-Just-Saint-Rambert (8)	2–2 (4–3 p)	AS Domérat (6)
7.	AS Saint-Priest (4)	1–2	FC Villefranche Beaujolais (3)
8.	AS Guéreins-Genouilleux (10)	2–1	Olympique Lyon Sud (7)
9.	US Issoire (7)	0–4	Le Puy Foot 43 Auvergne (4)
10.	Olympique de Valence (6)	4–3	L'Étrat-La Tour Sportif (7)
11.	FC Colombier-Satolas (8)	0–2	FC Saint-Cyr Collonges au Mont d'Or (6)
12.	AS Sud Ardèche (7)	0–2	FC Foron (7)
13.	ES Bressane Marboz (8)	2–0	ES Seynod (8)
14.	ASC Sallanches (9)	0–5	FC Bourgoin-Jallieu (5)
15.	FC Pays Voironnais (9)	1–3	FC Allobroges Asafia (7)
16.	Aix-les-Bains FC (7)	1–1 (2–4 p)	Valence FC (8)
17.	Football Bourg-en-Bresse Péronnas 01 (3)	1–2	GFA Rumilly-Vallières (4)
18.	CS Viriat (8)	0–1	GOAL FC (4)
19.	US Annecy-le-Vieux (7)	1–1 (2–4 p)	Chambéry SF (5)
20.	ASF Pierrelatte (8)	1–1 (4–5 p)	Cluses-Scionzier FC (6)
