= El Omar Fardi =

Footballer (born 2002)

Personal information
- Date of birth: 22 April 2002 (age 24)
- Place of birth: Marseille, France
- Height: 1.84 m (6 ft 0 in)
- Position: Defender

Team information
- Current team: Marseille B
- Number: 4

Youth career
- 2008–2018: Busserine
- 2018–2020: Marseille

Senior career*
Years	Team	Apps	(Gls)
2020–	Marseille B	1	(0)

International career
2021–	Comoros	1	(0)
- * Club domestic league appearances and goals as of 00:12, 17 June 2021 (UTC)

El Omar Fardi (born 22 April 2002) is a professional footballer who plays as a defender for Marseille B. Born in France, he plays for the Comoros national team.

== Club career ==
A youth product of Busserine, Fardi signed with Marseille's youth academy on 7 February 2018. He debuted with their reserve team in a 5–4 Championnat National 3 win over Jura Sud on 14 February 2020. He signed his first aspirant contract with Marseille on 2 April 2021.

== International career ==
Fardi made his senior international debut for Comoros in a 2021 FIFA Arab Cup qualification match against Palestine, a 5–1 defeat.
