= Edwin Massucco =

French footballer (born 1999)

Personal information
- Full name: Edwin Massucco
- Date of birth: 15 July 1999 (age 27)
- Place of birth: France
- Height: 1.83 m (6 ft 0 in)
- Position: Midfielder

Team information
- Current team: Jura Sud Foot

Senior career*
Years	Team	Apps	(Gls)
2016–2017	Evian TG II	1	(0)
2017–2020	Bourg-Péronnas II	17	(0)
2017–2020	Bourg-Péronnas	12	(0)
2020–	Jura Sud Foot	2	(0)
- * Club domestic league appearances and goals as of 16:23, 28 January 2021 (UTC)

Edwin Massucco (born 15 July 1999) is a French professional footballer who plays as a midfielder for Jura Sud Foot in the French Championnat National 1.

== Club career ==
Massucco made his senior debut for Football Bourg-en-Bresse Péronnas 01 in a 4–1 Ligue 2 loss to Clermont Foot on 8 September 2017.

In the summer of 2020 he left Bourg-Péronnas for Championnat National 2 side Jura Sud Foot in a bid to relaunch his career, after a serious knee ligament had hampered his progress.
