= Matusiwa =

Matusiwa is an Angolan surname. Notable people with the surname include:

- Azor Matusiwa (born 1998), Dutch footballer
- Diangi Matusiwa (born 1985), Angolan footballer
