= Benoît Tardieu =

Beninese professional footballer (born 1986)

Personal information
- Full name: Benoît Tardieu Verdenet
- Date of birth: 21 January 1986 (age 40)
- Place of birth: Ussel, France
- Height: 1.87 m (6 ft 2 in)
- Position: Goalkeeper

Team information
- Current team: Saint-Georges

Youth career
- 1997–1999: Montferrand
- 1999–2001: Nancy
- 2001–2005: Auxerre

Senior career*
Years	Team	Apps	(Gls)
2005–2006	Auxerre B	0	(0)
2006–2008	Clermont	2	(0)
2008–2009	Albi	27	(0)
2009–2011	Beaumont		
2011–	Saint-Georges	9	(0)

International career
2005–2008	Benin	2	(0)
- * Club domestic league appearances and goals

Benoît Tardieu Verdenet (born 21 January 1986) is a professional footballer who plays as a goalkeeper for French club Saint-Georges. Born in France, he is a former Benin international.

== Club career ==
Tardieu began to play football at youth age for Montferrand in 1997 and signed with AS Nancy in 1999. In 2001 he left Nancy and joined AJ Auxerre where he played at youth level for three years.

Tardieu began his professional career with Auxerre in the reserve squad. In summer 2006, after one year with the reserve team, he signed with Clermont. He played only two games in two years for Clermont and in July 2008 left the club. Tardieu signed with US Albi for the 2008–09 season and was released in summer 2009. In July 2009, after his release by Clermont, he signed for Beaumont. In June 2011 he signed for US Saint-Georges.

== International career ==
Tardieu played for the Benin U20 national team at the 2005 FIFA World Youth Championship in the Netherlands.

He made his debut for the senior national team on 4 June 2005 in the 2006 FIFA World Cup qualification match against Cameroon and his second call up was on 12 March 2008.
