= Diego Garzitto =

French footballer (born 1950)

Personal information
- Date of birth: 19 January 1950 (age 76)
- Place of birth: Lestizza, Italy
- Position: Defender

Team information
- Current team: Al-Ittihad (manager)

Senior career*
Years	Team	Apps	(Gls)
1971–1972	Louhans-Cuiseaux	30	(1)
1972–1973	Ajaccio	36	(0)
1973–1983	Louhans-Cuiseaux		
Total		66	(1)

Managerial career
- 1984–1985: Louhans-Cuiseaux
- 1986–1992: Lons-le-Saunier
- 1992–1995: Besançon RC
- 1995–1996: Bourg-Péronnas
- 1996–1997: FC Vaulx-en-Velin
- 1998–1999: Jura Sud Lavans
- 2000: Chasselay
- 2001: Ethiopia U20
- 2001–2002: Mâcon
- 2002: Togo
- 2003–2004: TP Mazembe
- 2004–2006: Louhans-Cuiseaux
- 2006–2007: Ethiopia
- 2007–2009: Jura Sud Lavans
- 2009–2010: TP Mazembe
- 2010: Wydad Casablanca
- 2012–2013: Al-Hilal Omdurman
- 2013: CS Constantine
- 2014–2015: Al-Merrikh
- 2017: Al-Merrikh
- 2017–2018: Al-Ittihad
- 2020: FC Saint-Éloi Lupopo
- * Club domestic league appearances and goals

Diego Garzitto (born 19 January 1950) is a French football coach and former professional player.

== Playing career ==
Born in Italy, Garzitto was raised in France, and spent his entire professional career in his adopted nation, playing as a defender for CS Louhans-Cuiseaux and AC Ajaccio.

== Coaching career ==
After coaching in the lower-leagues of France, Garzitto took charge of the under-20 national team of Ethiopia, leaving that position in August 2001. He then took charge of the national team of Togo in July 2002, leaving two months later. After returning to French club football for a period, Garzitto took charge of Ethiopia in December 2006, resigning two months later. Garzitto later led the Congolese side TP Mazembe to the 2009 CAF Champions League title, before later coaching Moroccan side Wydad Casablanca.

He became manager of Sudanese club Al-Merrikh in December 2014. He won the 2015 Sudan Premier League and 2015 Sudan Cup, and reached the semi-finals of 2015 CAF Champions League for the first time in the club's history, only losing to the eventual champions TP Mazembe. He left the club in November 2015 due to late salary payments.

In January 2017, he came back to manage Al-Merrikh in a hope to retrieve money allegedly owed to him.

He became the manager of Libyan club Al-Ittihad in August 2017. He became the manager of Saint-Eloi Lupopo in April 2020.
