= Maxime Jasse =

French footballer (born 1988)

Personal information
- Date of birth: 4 January 1988 (age 38)
- Place of birth: Villefranche-sur-Saône, France
- Height: 1.75 m (5 ft 9 in)
- Position: Midfielder

Youth career
- –2007: Auxerre

Senior career*
Years	Team	Apps	(Gls)
2007–2011	Auxerre	7	(0)
2009–2010	→ Dijon (loan)	1	(0)
2010–2011	Auxerre B	21	(1)
2011–2021	Villefranche	186	(26)
2021–2023	Mâcon	16+ (Note: Statistics unknown for the 2021–22 season.)	(1+)
Total		231+	(28+)
- * Club domestic league appearances and goals

Maxime Jasse (born 4 January 1988) is a French former professional footballer who played as midfielder.

== Career ==
Jasse trained as a youth with Auxerre, and in August 2007 made his Ligue 1 debut for the club against Lyon. He spent the 2009–10 season on loan with Ligue 2 side Dijon, and experienced a single first team game during the spell. In July 2011 he left Auxerre and signed for FC Villefranche of Championnat de France Amateur.

Jasse has been captain of Villefranche since at least 2015.

On 17 June 2021, he moved to Mâcon.
