= Tiko Messina =

Cameroonian footballer (born 1990)

Personal information
- Full name: Germain Francelin Tiko Messina
- Date of birth: 29 April 1990 (age 36)
- Place of birth: Yaoundé, Cameroon
- Height: 1.73 m (5 ft 8 in)
- Position: Midfielder

Youth career
- 2006–2007: Rot-Weiss Essen
- 2007–2009: Duisburg

Senior career*
Years	Team	Apps	(Gls)
2009–2012	Espanyol B		
2010	→ Compostela (loan)	12	(2)
2010–2011	→ Pontevedra (loan)	8	(0)
2012–2013	Etar 1924	5	(0)
2014	Apollon Kalamarias	8	(1)
2014–2015	Gavà		
2016–	Mâcon		
- * Club domestic league appearances and goals

Germain Francelin Tiko Messina (born 29 April 1990) is a Cameroonian professional footballer who plays as a midfielder for Mâcon.

== Personal life ==
Messina's daughter Serenna was born 25 August 2017 in Mâcon.
