= Jonathan Millieras =

French professional footballer (born 1993)

Personal information
- Date of birth: 19 May 1993 (age 33)
- Place of birth: Beaumont, France
- Height: 1.90 m (6 ft 3 in)
- Position: Goalkeeper

Team information
- Current team: Le Puy

Youth career
- 1999–2005: Aubierois
- 2005–2009: Montferrand
- 2009–2012: Châteauroux

Senior career*
Years	Team	Apps	(Gls)
2011–2016	Châteauroux	48	(0)
2013–2016	Châteauroux B	14	(0)
2017	Engordany		
2017–2022	Moulins Yzeure	103	(0)
2022–	Le Puy	0	(0)

International career
2011–2012	France U19	18	(0)
- * Club domestic league appearances and goals as of 28 May 2022

Jonathan Millieras (born 19 May 1993) is a French professional footballer who plays as a goalkeeper for Championnat National 1 club Le Puy.

== Club career ==
After spending the 2011–12 season as Châteauroux's third goalkeeper, ahead of the 2012–13 season, he was named the starting goalkeeper for the team's opening league match of the campaign against Laval. He subsequently made his professional debut in the match.

On 9 June 2022, Millieras signed with Le Puy.

== International career ==
Millieras is a France youth international, having represented his nation at under-19 level. He played with the under-19 team at the 2012 UEFA European Under-19 Football Championship.
