= Lavans-lès-Saint-Claude =

Commune in Bourgogne-Franche-Comté, France

- Commune
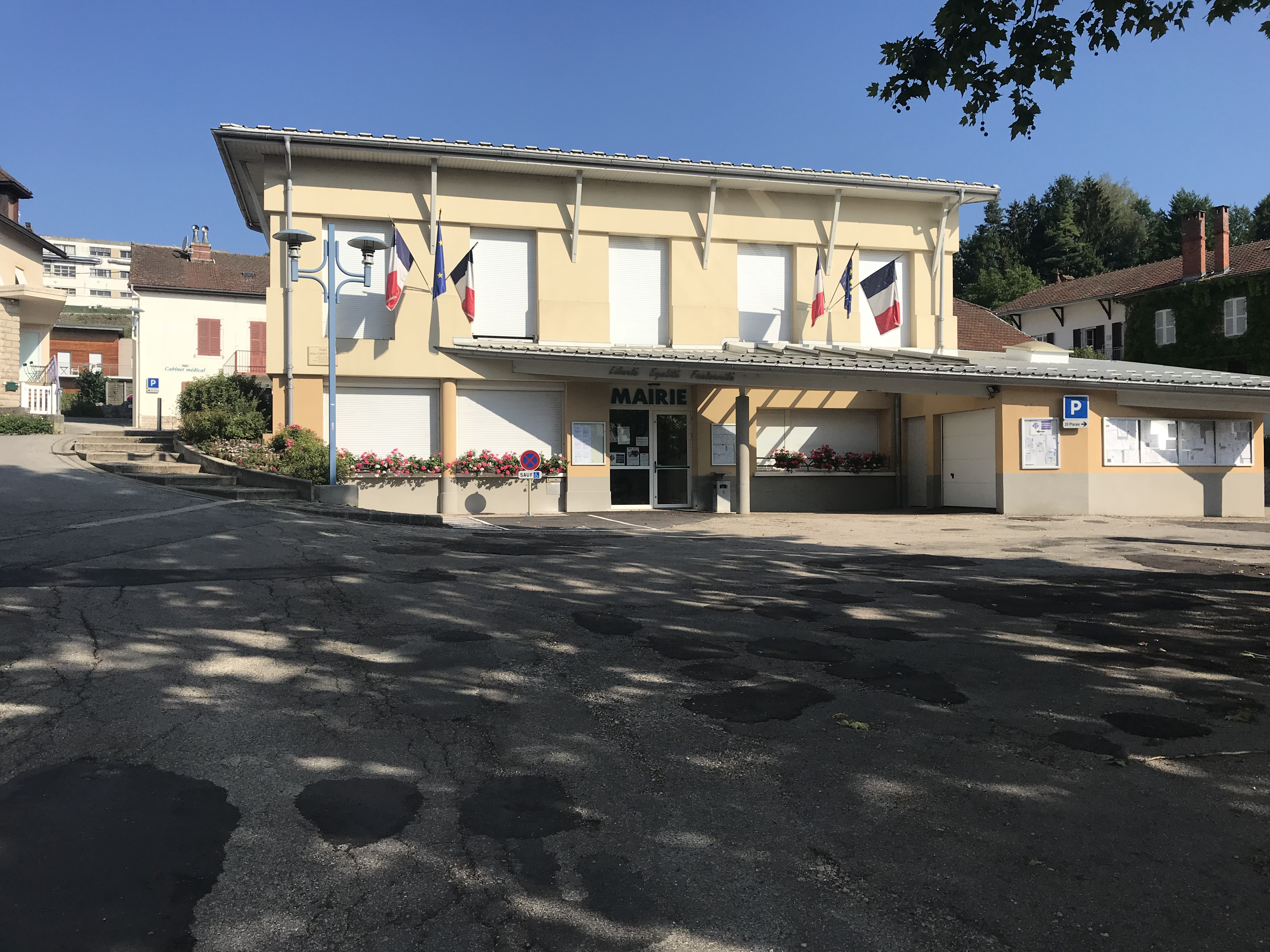
- The town hall in Lavans-lès-Saint-Claude
- Location of Lavans-lès-Saint-Claude
- Location within France Location within Bourgogne-Franche-Comté
- Coordinates: 46°23′14″N 5°46′59″E
- Country: France
- Region: Bourgogne-Franche-Comté
- Department: Jura
- Arrondissement: Saint-Claude
- Canton: Coteaux du Lizon
- Intercommunality: Haut-Jura Saint-Claude

Government
  - Mayor (2020–2026): Philippe Passot
- Area^{1}: 23.68 km^{2} (9.14 sq mi)
- Highest elevation: 936 m (3,071 ft)
- Lowest elevation: 356 m (1,168 ft)
- Population (2023): 2,351
  - Density: 99.28/km^{2} (257.1/sq mi)
- Time zone: UTC+01:00 (CET)
  - Summer (DST): UTC+02:00 (CEST)
- INSEE/Postal code: 39286 /39170
- ^{1} French Land Register data, which excludes lakes, ponds, glaciers > 1 km^{2} (0.386 sq mi or 247 acres) and river estuaries.

Lavans-lès-Saint-Claude (French pronunciation: [lavɑ̃ lɛ sɛ̃ klod], literally Lavans near Saint-Claude) is a commune in the Jura department in Bourgogne-Franche-Comté in eastern France. On 1 January 2016, the former commune of Ponthoux was merged into Lavans-lès-Saint-Claude. On 1 January 2019, the former commune of Pratz was merged into Lavans-lès-Saint-Claude.

== Population ==
Populations of the area corresponding with the commune of Lavans-lès-Saint-Claude at 1 January 2025.

Historical population
Year	Pop.	±% p.a.
1968	1,463	—
1975	1,804	+3.04%
1982	2,010	+1.56%
1990	2,282	+1.60%
1999	2,429	+0.70%
2007	2,534	+0.53%
2012	2,555	+0.17%
2017	2,437	−0.94%
2023	2,351	−0.60%
Source: INSEE

== Sport ==
Lavans-lès-Saint-Claude is the home of Championnat de France Amateurs club, Jura Sud Lavans.

== Personalities ==
- Antide Janvier (1751–1835), clockmaker, was born at Briva (today Brive), a hamlet within the commune.

== See also ==
- Communes of the Jura department
