= Naël Jaby =

French footballer (born 2001)

Personal information
- Date of birth: 20 April 2001 (age 25)
- Place of birth: Clermont-Ferrand, France
- Height: 1.75 m (5 ft 9 in)
- Position: Midfielder

Team information
- Current team: Fréjus Saint-Raphaël
- Number: 10

Youth career
- 2008–2009: US Vic-le-Comte
- 2009–2016: Montferrand
- 2016–2020: Clermont

Senior career*
Years	Team	Apps	(Gls)
2018–2023	Clermont B	46	(3)
2020–2021	→ Austria Lustenau (loan)	21	(1)
2021–2023	Clermont	0	(0)
2022–2023	→ Moulins Yzeure (loan)	25	(1)
2023–2024	Cannes	25	(3)
2024–	Fréjus Saint-Raphaël	39	(4)

International career
2019	France U18	5	(1)
2020	France U19	1	(0)
- * Club domestic league appearances and goals as of 1 January 2026

Naël Jaby (born 20 April 2001) is a French professional footballer who plays as a midfielder for Championnat National 1 club Fréjus Saint-Raphaël.

== Club career ==
Jaby began his career at US Vic-le-Comte in 2008, a year before joining Montferrand. In 2016, he joined the youth academy of Clermont. He started making appearances for the club's reserve side in the Championnat National 3 in the 2017–18 season. In the 2020–21 season, Jaby joined Austrian club Austria Lustenau on loan. He scored one goal and played twenty-one matches for the club in the 2. Liga before returning to his parent club. On 18 December 2021, Jaby made his senior debut for Clermont in a 4–0 Coupe de France win over Chemin Bas d'Avignon.

On 29 August 2022, Jaby joined Moulins Yzeure on a season-long loan.

In August 2024, following his departure from Clermont, Jaby joined Cannes on a one-year deal.

== International career ==
Born in France, Jaby is of Algerian descent and holds both French and Algerian nationalities. He has represented France at under-18 and under-19 level.

== Career statistics ==
As of match played 26 March 2022

Appearances and goals by club, season and competition
Club	Season	League			Cup		Other		Total	
Club	Season	Division	Apps	Goals	Apps	Goals	Apps	Goals	Apps	Goals
Clermont B	2017–18	National 3	3	0	—		—		3	0
Clermont B	2018–19	National 3	12	0	—		—		12	0
Clermont B	2019–20	National 3	17	3	—		—		17	3
Clermont B	2020–21	National 3	1	0	—		—		1	0
Clermont B	2021–22	National 3	10	0	—		—		10	0
Clermont B	Total		43	3	—		—		43	3
Austria Lustenau (loan)	2020–21	2. Liga	21	1	0	0	—		21	1
Clermont	2021–22	Ligue 1	0	0	1	0	—		1	0
Career total			64	4	1	0	0	0	65	4
