= Ponthoux =

- Part of Lavans-lès-Saint-Claude
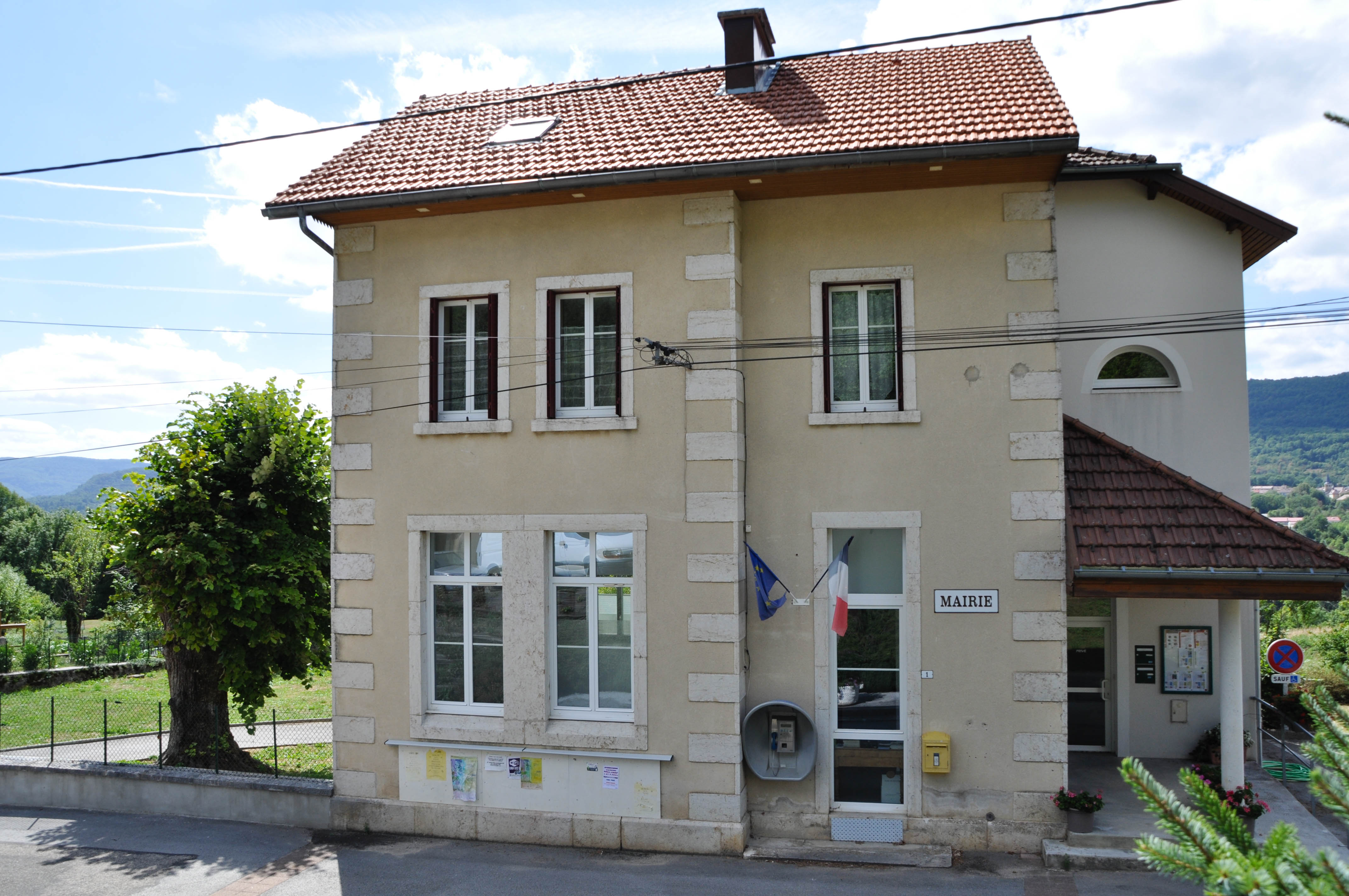
- Town hall
- Location of Ponthoux
- Location within France Location within Bourgogne-Franche-Comté
- Coordinates: 46°23′46″N 5°48′42″E
- Country: France
- Region: Bourgogne-Franche-Comté
- Department: Jura
- Arrondissement: Saint-Claude
- Canton: Saint-Lupicin
- Commune: Lavans-lès-Saint-Claude
- Area^{1}: 2.18 km^{2} (0.84 sq mi)
- Highest elevation: 890 m (2,920 ft)
- Lowest elevation: 420 m (1,380 ft)
- Population (2023): 84
  - Density: 39/km^{2} (100/sq mi)
- Time zone: UTC+01:00 (CET)
  - Summer (DST): UTC+02:00 (CEST)
- Postal code: 39170
- ^{1} French Land Register data, which excludes lakes, ponds, glaciers > 1 km^{2} (0.386 sq mi or 247 acres) and river estuaries.

Ponthoux (French pronunciation: [pɔ̃tu]) is a former commune in the Jura department in Bourgogne-Franche-Comté in eastern France. On 1 January 2016, it was merged into the commune of Lavans-lès-Saint-Claude.

== See also ==
- Communes of the Jura department
