= Daniel Gbaguidi =

Beninese footballer (born 1988)

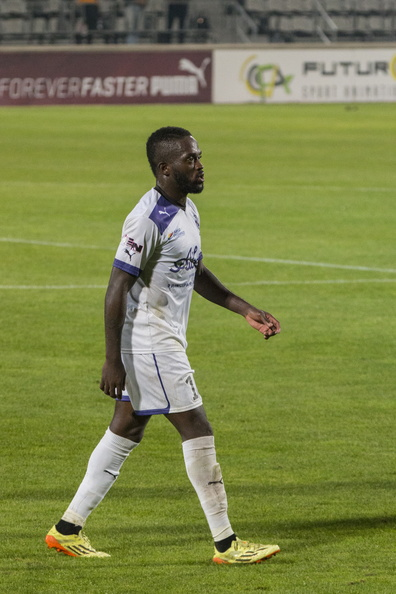
- Gbaguidi with Istres in 2014

Personal information
- Date of birth: 14 January 1988 (age 38)
- Place of birth: Cotonou, Benin
- Height: 1.76 m (5 ft 9 in)
- Position: Striker

Youth career
- 2001–2002: Vichy
- 2002–2003: Montferrand
- 2003–2004: Clermont
- 2004–2007: Marseille

Senior career*
Years	Team	Apps	(Gls)
2007–2008	Marseille B	62	(14)
2008	Cassis Carnoux	14	(1)
2009	Saint-Priest	3	(0)
2009–2010	Mulhouse	6	(0)
2010–2012	Villefranche	42	(7)
2012	FC Bleid	9	(5)
2012–2013	Virton	31	(4)
2013–2014	Iraklis Psachna	16	(1)
2014–2015	Istres	17	(2)
2016–2017	Villefranche	34	(9)
2017–2018	Saint-Priest	26	(5)
2018–2020	Vaulx-en-Velin	31	(8)
2020–2022	Mâcon		
Total		291+	(56+)

International career
2003–2004	France U15	8	(0)
2004–2005	France U16	6	(0)
2005–2006	France U17	1	(0)
2007–2008	France U21	2	(0)
2008	Benin	2	(0)
- * Club domestic league appearances and goals

Daniel Gbaguidi (born 14 January 1988) is a Beninese former professional footballer who played as a striker. Born in Benin, he represented France at youth level before playing for the Benin national team.

== Club career ==
Gbaguidi began his career 2001 with Vichy and joined Montferrand in 2002. He played only one season with the club before moving to Clermont in 2003. In May 2005 he left Clermont and signed with Marseille. On 1 July 2008, he left Marseille and joined to Championnat National club Cassis Carnoux. After only six months with Cassis Carnoux he signed with Saint-Priest in January 2009.

Since then, Gbaguidi has played for many different clubs: Mulhouse, Villefranche, FC Bleid, Virton, Iraklis Psachna, Istres, both Villefranche and Saint-Priest again, Vaulx-en-Velin, and Mâcon.

== International career ==
In January 2008 he was called up for a training camp with the French under-21 futsal team for a 4-day camp.

He played his debut game for Benin on 1 June 2008 against Angola. Gbaguidi is also former youth player from France he presented from 2003 to 2008 the U-15, U-16, U-17 and U-21.
