= Mâcon 71 =

Football club in Mâcon, France

Mâcon
- Full name: Mâcon 71
- Founded: 1999; 27 years ago
- Stadium: Stade Pierre Guérin
- Capacity: 2,000
- President: Alain Griezmann
- Manager: Romain Paturel
- League: National 2 Group G
- 2025–26: National 3 Group G, 2nd of 14 (Note: The club was not promoted for this finish; the reason they're league is National 2 is that the National 3 has been renamed going into the 2026-27 season.)
- Website: https://ufm.footeo.com/
Home colours

Mâcon 71 is a football club located in Mâcon, France. They play in Championnat National 2, the fifth tier of French football. The club's president is Alain Griezmann, the father of professional footballer Antoine Griezmann. Mâcon's club colour is marine blue.

== History ==
Founded in 1997, UF Mâconnais came to be firstly from the merger of Union Sportive de Charnay and ASPTT Mâcon, and secondly from the merger of the newly created Entente Charnay et Mâcon 71 and Football Club Mâcon. Initially called Mâconnais Football Club, it was renamed to Union du Football Mâconnais in 2000.

Youth development is an important aspect of UF Mâconnais. The U17 team of the club formerly competed in the Championnat National U17 from 2010 to 2015.

The highest tier the club has played in during its history is the fourth, playing in the Championnat National 2 for the 2023–24 season. In the 2020–21 season, Mâcon reached the round of 64 of the Coupe de France, the furthest they had ever progressed in the competition.

The club was renamed to Mâcon 71 in 2025.

=== Managerial history ===
- 1997–2001: (France) Christian Romond
- 2001–2002: (France) Diego Garzitto
- 2002–2006: (France) Patrice Monteilh
- 2006–2008: (France) Joël Greuzet
- 2008–2009: (France) Unknown
- 2009–2012: (France) Jean-Philippe Forêt
- 2012–2013: (France) Thierry Droin
- 2013–2015: (France) Denis Promonet
- 2015–2017: (France) Frédéric Jay
- 2017–2020: (France) Jean Acédo
- 2020–present: (France) Romain Paturel

=== Presidential history ===
- 1997–1999: (France) Pierre Augagneur
- 1999–2000: (France) Maurice Portrait
- 2000–2002: (France) Alain Rigaudier
- 2002–2011: (France) Serge Rivéra
- 2011–2013: (France) Denis Jacquet
- 2013–2016: (France) Manuel Goncalvès
- 2016–2020: (France) Stéphane Margand
- 2020–present: (France) Alain Griezmann

== Players ==
=== Current squad ===
As of the 2020–21 season

Note: Flags indicate national team as defined under FIFA eligibility rules; some limited exceptions apply. Players may hold more than one non-FIFA nationality.

No.	Pos.	Nation	Player
—	GK	FRA	Jerôme Belleville
—	GK	FRA	Aurélien Tomassi
—	GK	FRA	José Bunga Marcos
—	DF	FRA	Valentin Bizel
—	DF	FRA	Mohamed Doudou
—	DF	FRA	Sindou Karamoko
—	DF	FRA	Toufik Morceli
—	DF	FRA	Jeoffrey Rouabhi
—	DF	FRA	Jules Tribollet
—	DF	FRA	Christophe Boyer
—	DF	FRA	Anthony Dunant
—	DF	FRA	Nicolas Lepesqueux
—	DF	FRA	Julien Perbet

No.	Pos.	Nation	Player
—	DF	MAR	Majid Sbai
—	DF	FRA	Martin Voir
—	MF	FRA	Mathieu Barrabourg
—	MF	FRA	Théo Cianfarani
—	MF	FRA	Kévin Dupasquier
—	MF	BEN	Daniel Gbaguidi
—	MF	FRA	Maxime Moisy
—	MF	FRA	Maxence Ravinet
—	MF	CMR	Yannick Teudjou
—	MF	FRA	Theo Vannet
—	MF	FRA	Sofian Benmedjahed
—	MF	FRA	Donatien Cotinet
—	MF	FRA	Mahamet Gassama

No.	Pos.	Nation	Player
—	MF	FRA	Jessy Ibarra
—	MF	FRA	Kevin Pourprix
—	MF	FRA	Anthony Segaud
—	MF	CMR	Tiko Messina
—	FW	FRA	Alpha Ba
—	FW	FRA	Ugo Boivin
—	FW	FRA	Julien Garcia
—	FW	FRA	Mathéo Renon
—	FW	FRA	Axel Thoumin
—	FW	ALG	Hamza Bekhakh
—	FW	FRA	Luigi Fezzoli
—	FW	FRA	Sakhir Ndiankou Ndoye
—	FW	FRA	Alex Rougeot

=== Notable former players ===
- (Benin) Daniel Gbaguidi
- (France) Antoine Griezmann (youth)
- (France) Maxime Jasse
- (Angola) Diangi Matusiwa
- (France) Maxime Moisy
- (France) Youssouf N'Diaye
- (France) Junior Sambia

== Honours ==
UF Mâconnais honours
Teams	No.	Years
Division d'Honneur Bourgogne	2	1998–99, 2002–03
Championnat National 3	1	2022–23

== Previous logos ==
Logo from 2017 to 2025
