= Maxime Moisy =

French footballer (born 1992)

Personal information
- Date of birth: 13 October 1992 (age 34)
- Place of birth: Aire-sur-l'Adour, France
- Height: 1.80 m (5 ft 11 in)
- Position: Midfielder

Senior career*
Years	Team	Apps	(Gls)
2011–2016	Bourg-en-Bresse	46	(2)
2016–2019	Jura Sud	66	(8)
2019–2020	Monts d'Or Azergues	5	(0)
2020–2021	Mâcon		
Total		117+	(10+)
- * Club domestic league appearances and goals

Maxime Moisy (born 13 October 1992) is a French former professional footballer who plays as a midfielder.

== Career ==
On 17 June 2019, Moisy officially joined Monts d'Or Azergues. He signed for Mâcon in July 2020.

== Career statistics ==
As of 7 March 2020

Appearances and goals by club, season and competition
Club	Season	League			Cup		Other		Total	
Club	Season	Division	Apps	Goals	Apps	Goals	Apps	Goals	Apps	Goals
Bourg-en-Bresse	2010–11	CFA	1	0	0	0	—		1	0
Bourg-en-Bresse	2011–12	CFA	5	0	0	0	—		5	0
Bourg-en-Bresse	2012–13	National	21	2	2	0	—		23	2
Bourg-en-Bresse	2013–14	National	5	0	0	0	—		5	0
Bourg-en-Bresse	2014–15	National	12	0	0	0	—		12	0
Bourg-en-Bresse	2015–16	Ligue 2	2	0	1	0	2 (Note: Appearances in the Coupe de la Ligue)	0	5	0
Bourg-en-Bresse	Total		46	2	3	0	2	0	51	2
Jura Sud	2016–17	CFA	20	3	0	0	—		20	3
Jura Sud	2017–18	National 2	23	1	0	0	—		23	1
Jura Sud	2018–19	National 2	23	4	0	0	—		23	4
Jura Sud	Total		66	8	0	0	0	0	66	8
Monts d'Or Azergues	2019–20	National 2	5	0	0	0	—		5	0
Career total			117	10	3	0	2	0	122	10
