= Pratz, Jura =

Pratz
- Part of Lavans-lès-Saint-Claude
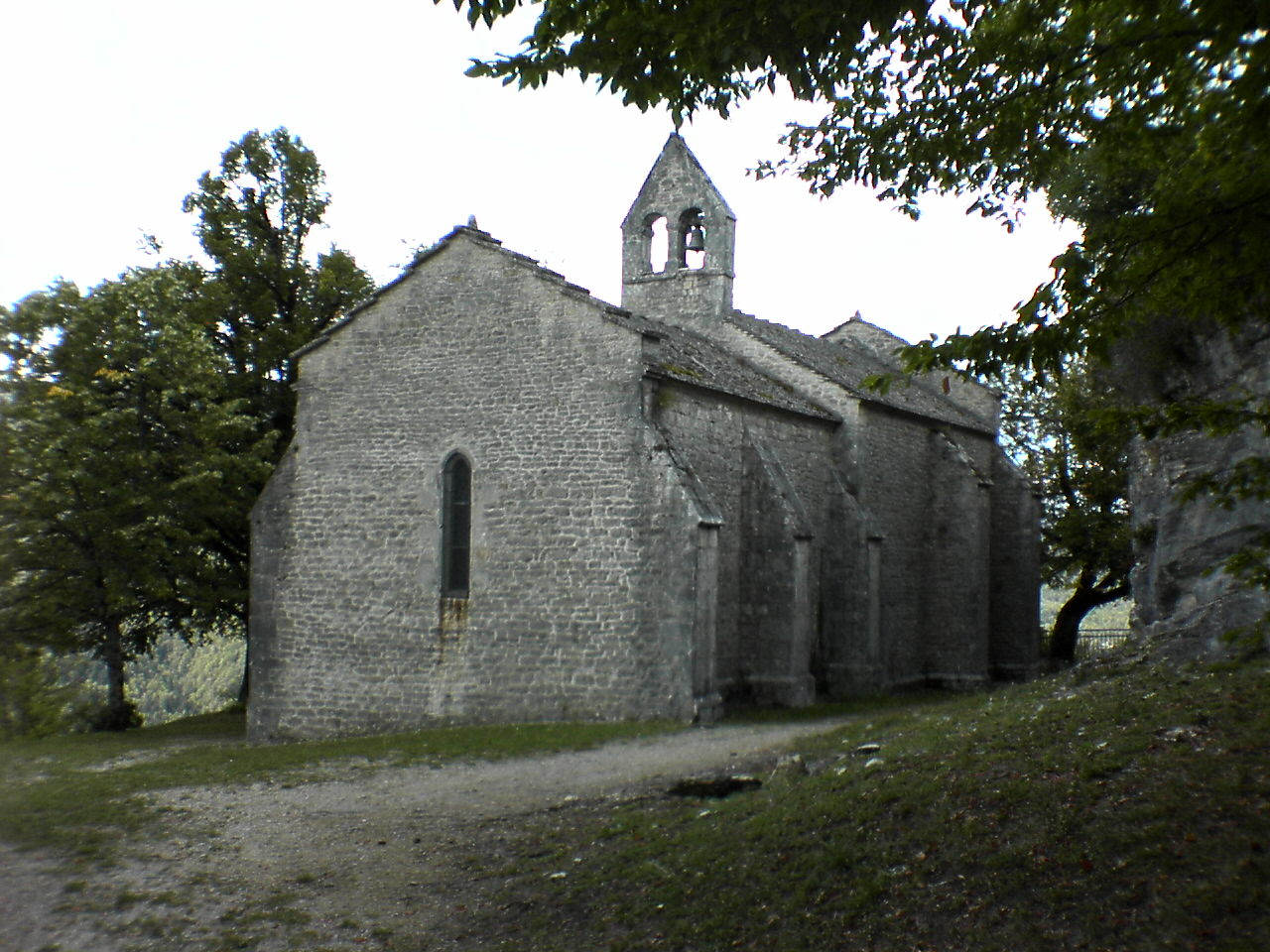
- Location of Pratz
- Location within France Location within Bourgogne-Franche-Comté
- Coordinates: 46°22′46″N 5°45′49″E
- Country: France
- Region: Bourgogne-Franche-Comté
- Department: Jura
- Arrondissement: Saint-Claude
- Canton: Moirans-en-Montagne
- Commune: Lavans-lès-Saint-Claude
- Area^{1}: 9.85 km^{2} (3.80 sq mi)
- Highest elevation: 948 m (3,110 ft)
- Lowest elevation: 400 m (1,300 ft)
- Population (2023): 516
  - Density: 52.4/km^{2} (136/sq mi)
- Time zone: UTC+01:00 (CET)
  - Summer (DST): UTC+02:00 (CEST)
- Postal code: 39170
- ^{1} French Land Register data, which excludes lakes, ponds, glaciers > 1 km^{2} (0.386 sq mi or 247 acres) and river estuaries.

Pratz (French pronunciation: [pʁa]) is a former commune in the Jura department in Bourgogne-Franche-Comté in eastern France. On 1 January 2019, it was merged into the commune Lavans-lès-Saint-Claude.

== See also ==
- Communes of the Jura department
