= Jules Sbroglia =

French footballer (1929–2007)

Personal information
- Full name: Jules Leon Sbroglia
- Date of birth: 1 July 1929
- Place of birth: Audun-le-Tiche, France
- Date of death: 21 April 2007 (aged 77)
- Place of death: Perpignan, France
- Height: 1.72 m (5 ft 8 in)
- Position: Defender

Senior career*
Years	Team	Apps	(Gls)
1949–1950	Metz	16	(2)
1950–1952	Metz B		
1952–1959	Angers	234	(11)
1959–1960	Lyon	29	(0)
1960–1962	Rouen	59	(0)
1962–1964	AS Cherbourg	57	(0)
1964–1965	Stade Clermontois		
1965–1968	AS Montferrand		

International career
- France youth
- France military
- France B

Managerial career
- 1964–1975: AS Montferrand
- 1977–1981: AS Montferrand
- 1981–1982: AS Montferrand
- * Club domestic league appearances and goals

Jules Leon Sbroglia (1 July 1929 – 21 April 2007) was a French footballer who played as a defender.

== Early life and playing career ==
Born in Audun-le-Tiche on 1 July 1929, Sbroglia was the son of Italian immigrants who had arrived in France seven years prior. He began his playing career at Metz, before joining Angers in 1952. In July 1953, he played for a Lorraine-select team, alongside the likes of Roger Piantoni, François Remetter, René Pleimelding and Thadée Cisowski that beat Juventus 2–1.

Four years later, he served as the club's captain during the 1957 Coupe de France final, where they lost 6–3 to Toulouse. Overall, he made over 270 appearances for Angers, before playing for the likes of Lyon, Rouen, AS Cherbourg, Stade Clermontois, and AS Montferrand, before retiring in 1968.

Sbroglia represented the French national team at junior level, as well as the military national team and national B team.

In 1959, he became the first player to be awarded the French Player of the Year by France Football, and later that year won the Etoile d'Or, the award for the best player in the French Division 1.

== Post-playing career ==
Sbroglia served three separate stints as the manager of AS Montferrand between 1964 and 1982.

He later spent four years in the Ivory Coast, helping develop football in the country. After returning to France, he served on the technical commission of the District de Football des Pyrénées-Orientales, who oversee local football in Pyrénées-Orientales.

== Death and legacy ==
Sbroglia died in Perpignan on 21 April 2007, at the age of 77. Following his death, a regional youth football tournament in Auvergne was named after him, the Challenge Jules Sbroglia.

== Honours ==
Angers

- Division 2 runner-up: 1955–56
- Coupe de France runner-up: 1956–57

Individual

- French Player of the Year: 1959
- Etoile d'Or: 1959
