= Youssouf N'Diaye =

French footballer (born 1995)

Youssouf Ndiaye
Personal information
- Date of birth: 19 October 1995 (age 31)
- Place of birth: Lyon, France
- Height: 1.89 m (6 ft 2 in)
- Position: Midfielder

Team information
- Current team: Haguenau

Youth career
- Eveil de Lyon
- Cascol Oulins
- Mâcon

Senior career*
| Years | Team | Apps | (Gls) |
| 2013–2015 | Vénissieux | 3 | (0) |
| 2016–2018 | Bourg-en-Bresse | 19 | (2) |
| 2017–2018 | Bourg-en-Bresse B | 11 | (0) |
| 2018–2019 | Villefranche | 19 | (1) |
| 2019–2021 | Laval | 31 | (1) |
| 2019 | Laval B | 2 | (0) |
| 2021–2022 | Lyon La Duchère | 21 | (0) |
| 2022 | Lyon La Duchère B | 1 | (0) |
| 2022–2023 | Angoulême | 14 | (0) |
| 2024 | Hauts Lyonnais | 14 | (2) |
| 2024– | Haguenau | 5 | (0) |
- * Club domestic league appearances and goals as of 7 December 2024

Youssouf N'Diaye (born 19 October 1995) is a French professional footballer who plays as a midfielder for Championnat National 1 club Haguenau.

== Career ==
Born in Lyon, France, N'Diaye played at youth level for his local club Eveil de Lyon, and later moved to Cascol Oulins and Mâcon. He joined Vénissieux at Under-19 level, and went on to play for the senior side. In 2015 he signed with the reserve of Football Bourg-en-Bresse Péronnas 01.

N'Diaye signed his first professional football contract with Bourg-en-Bresse in April 2017. He made his Ligue 2 debut a month later, coming on as a substitute in the 3–2 away victory at Clermont.

Released by Bourg-en-Bresse at the end of the 2017–18 season, N'Diaye had a successful trial with EFL Championship club Bolton Wanderers, but the deal fell through in September 2018 due to Bolton not being allowed to recruit. He eventually signed for FC Villefranche in Championnat National in November 2018.

In June 2019, N'Diaye signed for Laval on a two-year contract. On 2 July 2021, he moved to Lyon La Duchère.

== Personal life ==
Born in France, N'Diaye is of Senegalese descent.
