= Hans Venneker =

Dutch footballer

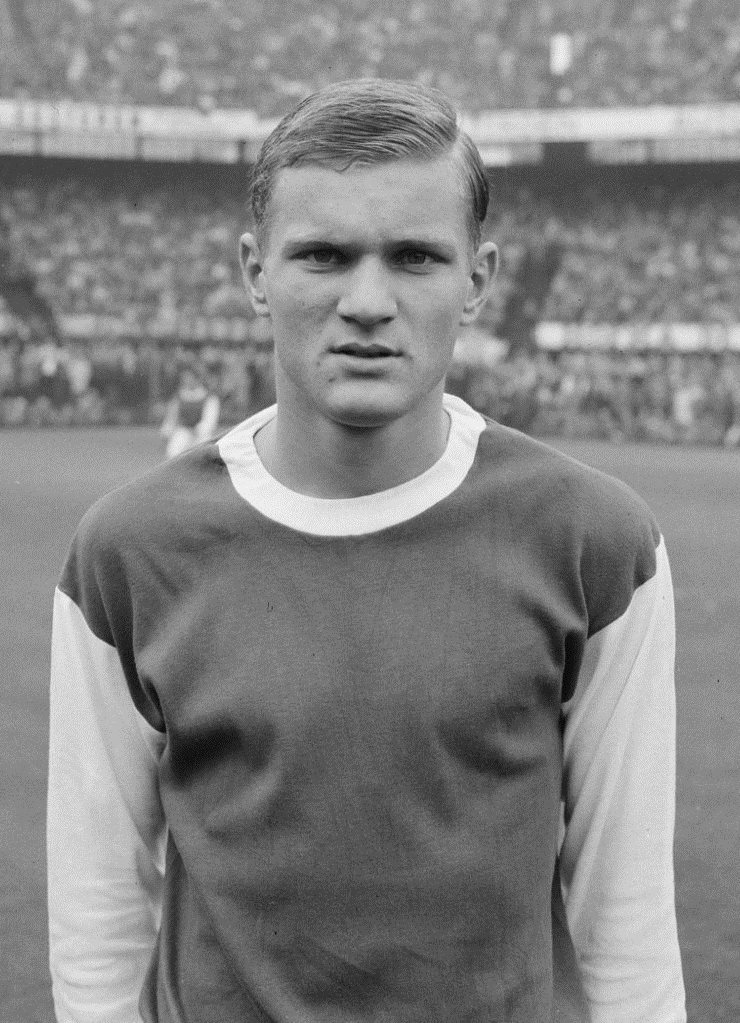
- Venneker in 1965

Personal information
- Full name: Johannes Gerardus Nicolaas Venneker
- Date of birth: 5 March 1945 (age 81)
- Place of birth: Rotterdam, Netherlands
- Positions: Forward; right-back

Youth career
- Feijenoord

Senior career*
Years	Team	Apps	(Gls)
1964–1967	Feijenoord	33	(26)
1967–1968	NEC Nijmegen	34	(19)
1968–1975	Sparta Rotterdam	228	(57)
1975–1977	Montferrand		

International career
1971–1972	Netherlands	4	(0)

Managerial career
- 1975–1977: Montferrand (player manager)
- * Club domestic league appearances and goals

Johannes Gerardus Nicolaas Venneker (born 5 March 1945) is a Dutch former footballer who played as a forward. A Feijenoord youth product, he made his Eredivisie debut with club and went on to play for NEC Nijmegen, Sparta Rotterdam and French club Montferrand. He also made four appearances for the Netherlands national team. Venneker is the only Feyenoord player to have scored five goals in a match against De Klassieker rivals Ajax Amsterdam.

== Career ==
Venneker was born in Rotterdam. Until the age of 18 he played as a goalkeeper. On 29 November 1964, aged 19, he scored five goals in Feijenoord's 9–4 win in De Klassieker against Ajax Amsterdam. To this day, he is the only Feyenoord player to have achieved this feat.

Following a move to NEC Nijmegen Venneker spent seven years at Sparta Rotterdam. At Sparta, he was deployed in the right-back position by coach Georg Keßler. Later in his time there he also featured for the Netherlands national team, making four appearances.

== Personal life ==
Venneker has two sons with his wife Sylvia. He owned a sports shop called "Venneker Sporting" in Hellevoetsluis. As of January 2015 he lived in Rockanje. In January 2015 it was announced he would take up the role of technical advisor at lower-league club VV Nieuwenhoorn for the 2015–16 season. He successfully underwent heart surgery in September 2020. At the time he was chairman of Oud-Feyenoord, a team of former Feyenoord players, and living in Brielle.

== Honours ==
Feijenoord

- Eredivisie: 1964–65
- KNVB Cup: 1964–65
