= Jimmy Mainfroi =

French footballer (born 1983)

Personal information
- Date of birth: 28 March 1983 (age 43)
- Place of birth: Mâcon, Saône-et-Loire, France
- Height: 1.80 m (5 ft 11 in)
- Position: Right-back

Youth career
- 1998–2002: Montpeller

Senior career*
Years	Team	Apps	(Gls)
2002–2004	Montpellier B	56	(2)
2004–2007	Montpeller	60	(1)
2007–2011	Grenoble	74	(0)
2012–2013	Amiens	32	(0)
Total		222	(3)
- * Club domestic league appearances and goals

Jimmy Mainfroi (born 28 March 1983) is a Réunion-French former professional footballer who played as a right-back.

== Career ==
Mainfroi began his career at the age of fifteen with Montpellier HSC, was promoted to first team in January 2004 and made his professional football debut on 6 March 2004 in the Ligue 2 match with Montpellier against Toulouse F.C. In July 2007, he joined Grenoble Foot 38 on a free transfer, he left also after six years Montpellier. On 30 October 2008, Mainfroi was expected to be out for the rest of the season after undergoing surgery. On 16 January 2012, he signed a three-year contract with Ligue 2 side Amiens SC after being released from Grenoble.

== Career statistics ==
- 2003–04 Montpellier HSC, Ligue 1 (11 matches)
- 2004–05 Montpellier HSC, Ligue 2 (18 matches)
- 2005–06 Montpellier HSC, Ligue 2 (15 matches)
- 2006–07 Montpellier HSC, Ligue 2 (16 matches, 1 goal)
- 2007–08 Grenoble Foot 38, Ligue 2 (27 matches)
- 2008–09 Grenoble Foot 38, Ligue 1 (9 matches)
- 2009–10 Grenoble Foot 38, Ligue 1 (14 matches)
- 2010–11 Grenoble Foot 38, Ligue 2 (24 matches)
- 2011–12 Amiens SC, Ligue 2
