= Diangi Matusiwa =

Angolan footballer (born 1985)

Personal information
- Full name: Diangi Reagan Kisisavo Matusiwa
- Date of birth: 21 December 1985 (age 40)
- Place of birth: Luanda, Angola
- Height: 1.76 m (5 ft 9 in)
- Position: Forward

Senior career*
Years	Team	Apps	(Gls)
2005–2007	Argon	0	(0)
2007–2008	FC Omniworld	29	(11)
2008–2010	Den Bosch	73	(24)
2010	APOP Kinyras	9	(1)
2011–2012	Tienen	30	(9)
2012	Mura 05	7	(1)
2013–2014	Telstar	30	(8)
2014–2015	Caála		
2015	Inter Luanda		
2016	Académica do Lobito		
2016–2017	Mâcon		
2017	Gällivare Malmbergets FF	9	(4)
2018	DHSC		
2018–2019	Louhans-Cuiseaux FC	0	(8)
2019–2021	Wezel Sport	10	(3)

International career
2007	Angola	1	(0)
- * Club domestic league appearances and goals

Diangi Matusiwa (born 21 December 1985) is an Angolan former professional footballer who played as a forward. He made one appearance for the Angola national team and was part of the squad at the 2008 African Cup of Nations.

== Career ==
Matusiwa played for Dutch club DHSC which he joined in January 2018 and played for until the summer. Ahead of the 2019–20 season, he then joined Wezel Sport.
