= Paul Cattier =

French footballer (born 1986)

Personal information
- Date of birth: 1 May 1986 (age 40)
- Place of birth: Avignon, France
- Height: 1.87 m (6 ft 2 in)
- Position: Goalkeeper

Team information
- Current team: Poitiers

Youth career
- 2001–2003: Grenoble

Senior career*
Years	Team	Apps	(Gls)
2003–2005	Grenoble	0	(0)
2005–2006	Rodez	13	(0)
2006–2010	Grenoble	2	(0)
2010–2011	Fréjus Saint-Raphaël	33	(0)
2011–2013	Romorantin	57	(0)
2013–2015	Grenoble	30	(0)
2015–2019	Jura Sud	110	(0)
2019–2021	Athlético Marseille	22	(0)
2021–	Poitiers	20	(0)
- * Club domestic league appearances and goals as of 15:01, 26 April 2022 (UTC)

Paul Cattier (born 1 May 1986) is a French professional footballer who plays as a goalkeeper for Championnat National 1 club Poitiers.

== Career ==
Born in Avignon, Cattier began his career in 2001 in the Grenoble youth team, then joined Rodez in 2003. After one season he moved back to Grenoble and was promoted to the first team. He played his first two games in the 2007–08 season.

Cattier joined Athlético Marseille in June 2019. He signed for Poitiers in 2021.
