= AS Montferrand Football =

Football section of ASM Omnisports

Montferrand
- Full name: Association Sportive Montferrandaise Football
- Short name: ASM, Montferrand
- Founded: 1911
- Dissolved: 2004 (senior team)
- President: Jean-Michel Reberry
- Website: https://www.asm-omnisports.com/football/

Association Sportive Montferrandaise Football is the football section of AS Montferrand Omnisports, a French multi-sport club based in Clermont-Ferrand. Founded in 1911, the club terminated the senior football team in 2004. As of 2022, AS Montferrand Football has approximately 450 employees and 28 male and female youth teams from the ages of 6 to 19.

== Honours ==
AS Montferrand Football honours
Honour	No.	Years
Division d'Honneur Auvergne	4	1927–28, 1963–64, 1996–97, 2001–02
Division 4 Group E	1	1981–82

== Notable former players ==
- (Togo) Othniel Dossevi
- (Benin) Daniel Gbaguidi
- (France) Naël Jaby
- (France) Jonathan Millieras
- (France) Jules Sbroglia
- (Mali) Yacouba Sylla
- (Benin) Benoît Tardieu
- (France) Gaëtan Varenne
- (Netherlands) Hans Venneker
- (France) Christian Zajaczkowski
