= Jura Sud Foot =

French football club

Jura Sud
- Full name: Jura Sud Foot
- Nickname: Jura Sud Lavans
- Founded: 1991
- Ground: Stade Municipal de Moirans
- Capacity: 5,000
- Chairman: Edmond Perrier
- Manager: Valentin Guichard
- League: National 2
- 2025–26: National 3 Group G, 13th
- Website: http://www.jurasudfoot.com
Home colours	Away colours

Jura Sud Foot is a football club based in Lavans-lès-Saint-Claude, France. They play at the Stade Municipal de Moirans in Lavans-lès-Saint-Claude. The club was founded in 1991. Currently they play in Championnat National 2 (fifth tier).

== History ==
- The club was founded in 1991 by merger of three clubs: AS Moirans-en-Montagne (established 1920), the CS Molinges / Chassal (1940) and the Agreement Lavans-lès-Saint-Claude/Saint-Lupicin (1985).
- 2009 new merger with St Claude Val Biel

Jura Sud reached the 1/16-finals of the 1998–99 Coupe de France and the 2014–15 Coupe de France.

== Current squad ==
As of 12 February 2019

Note: Flags indicate national team as defined under FIFA eligibility rules; some limited exceptions apply. Players may hold more than one non-FIFA nationality.

No.	Pos.	Nation	Player
—	GK	FRA	Anthony Bal
—	GK	FRA	Paul Cattier
—	GK	CMR	Stéphan Moussima Ngoh
—	DF	FRA	Aurélien Faivre
—	DF	FRA	Celian Besson
—	DF	FRA	Jérémy Fahrasmane
—	DF	SUI	John Dinkota
—	DF	FRA	Matthieu Morel
—	DF	ROU	Sorin Cucu
—	DF	FRA	Valentin Guichard
—	DF	CTA	Gisbert Zarambaud
—	MF	FRA	Alexi Peuget
—	MF	FRA	Antoine Bon

No.	Pos.	Nation	Player
—	MF	FRA	Jordan Aidoud
—	MF	FRA	Jordan Gaubey
—	MF	FRA	Maxime Moisy
—	MF	MAR	Samir Diri
—	MF	ALG	Sami Saci
—	MF	FRA	Sasha Bogovic
—	MF	FRA	Thomas Delorme
—	FW	FRA	Grégory Thil
—	FW	HAI	Listner Pierre-Louis
—	FW	FRA	Romain Davigny
—	FW	FRA	Yohann Ekollo
—	FW	COD	Yves Angani
—	FW	MAR	Yassine Assakour

== Coaches ==
- 2002–2004: Diego Garzitto
- 2006–2007: Eric Fouda
- 2007–2008: Diego Garzitto
- 2008–2009: Vincent Baby and from 1 October 2008, Sebastien Cuvier
- 2009–2012: Sébastien Cuvier
- 2012–: Pascal Moulin
