= US Saint-Georges =

French football club

US Saint-Georges (French: Union Sportive Saint-Georges-les-Ancizes) is a French football club based in Saint-Georges-de-Mons (Puy-de-Dôme). It was founded in 1923. They play at the Stade de Grelières, which has a capacity of 3,200. The colours of the club are red and blue.

For the 2006/2007 season the club plays in the Championnat de France Amateurs, Groupe C.

Saint-Georges reached the 1/8-finals of the 1998–99 Coupe de France and the 1/16-finals of the 2000–01 Coupe de France.
