= 2019–20 Coupe de France preliminary rounds, Bourgogne-Franche-Comté =

The 2019–20 Coupe de France preliminary rounds, Bourgogne-Franche-Comté was the qualifying competition to decide which teams from the leagues of the Bourgogne-Franche-Comté region of France took part in the main competition from the seventh round.

A total of eight teams qualified from the Bourgogne-Franche-Comté preliminary rounds. In 2018–19, none of the qualified teams made it past the eighth round.

== Schedule ==
The first two rounds of qualifying took place on the weekends of 17/18 and 24/25 August 2019. A total of 326 teams from Regional 2 (tier 7) and below were included in the draw, with 30 Regional 2 teams given byes to the second round.

The third round draw was made on 3 September 2019. The 22 teams from Regional 1 (tier 6) and the 11 teams from Championnat National 3 (tier 5) joined at this stage.

The fourth round draw was made on 17 September 2019. The 3 teams from Championnat National 2 (tier 4) joined at this stage.

The fifth round draw was made on 2 October 2019. 16 ties were drawn.

The sixth round draw was made on 16 October 2019. Eight ties were drawn.

=== First round ===
These matches were played on 17 and 18 August 2019.

First round results: Bourgogne-Franche-Comté
Tie no	Home team (tier)	Score	Away team (tier)
1.	ES Trévillers-Thiébouhans (11)	1–0	AS Présentevillers-Ste Marie (10)
2.	AS Orchamps-Vennes (9)	1–1 (3–5 p)	FC Villars-sous-Écot (9)
3.	FC Le Russey (11)	2–1	Rougemont Concorde (10)
4.	AS Courtefontaine-Les Plains (10)	1–4	US Sous-Roches (8)
5.	ASL Autechaux-Roide (10)	13–0	AS Noël-Cerneux-Chenalotte (11)
6.	US Les Fins (11)	0–5	US Pont-de-Roide (7)
7.	AS Avoudrey (10)	1–2	FC L'Isle-sur-le-Doubs (8)
8.	ES Bretonvillers-Charmoille (12)	2–4	FAC Lougres (12)
9.	US St Hippolyte (12)	0–4	ES Pays Maîchois (8)
10.	Longevelle SC (10)	3–2	US Bavans (10)
11.	AS Pierrefontaine et Laviron (10)	3–4	ES Exincourt-Taillecourt (10)
12.	FC Plaimbois-du-Miroir (12)	0–1	AS Guyans-Vennes (10)
13.	AS Nord Territoire (9)	1–4	SC St Loup-Corbenay-Magnoncourt (9)
14.	FC Pays de Luxeuil (12)	2–5	RC Voujeaucourt (10)
15.	GLS Club 90 (11)	1–4	AS Essert (11)
16.	AS Fougerolles (10)	0–4	Bessoncourt Roppe Club Larivière (8)
17.	FC Colombe (10)	1–0	FC Giro-Lepuix (8)
18.	FC Pays Minier (10)	2–1	SCM Valdoie (9)
19.	SC Lure (9)	4–1	FC Haute Vallée de l'Ognon (10)
20.	AS Hérimoncourt (9)	2–4 (a.e.t.)	Olympique Courcelles-lès-Montbéliard (9)
21.	USC Sermamagny (10)	0–3 (Note: Tie won by means of forfeit.)	AS Bavilliers (8)
22.	US Franchevelle (9)	2–1	AS Danjoutin-Andelnans-Méroux (8)
23.	FC Étupes (11)	2–3	CS Beaucourt (9)
24.	AS Méziré-Fesches-le-Châtel (9)	0–3	AS Mélisey-St Barthélemy (8)
25.	SR Delle (9)	3–3 (4–5 p) (Note: Tie reversed with agreement of both clubs.)	SG Héricourt (8)
26.	Entente Le Châteleu (11)	4–2	AS Mont d'Usiers (10)
27.	Drugeon Sports (12)	2–6	Arcade Foot (9)
28.	ES Sirod (9)	3–6	ES Les Fonges 91 (10)
29.	ES Les Sapins (10)	1–2 (a.e.t.)	US Crotenay Combe d'Ain (10)
30.	FC Haut Jura (9)	4–2	CS Frasne (10)
31.	FC Massif Haut Doubs (11)	1–2 (a.e.t.)	AS Château de Joux (9)
32.	FC Lac-Remoray-Vaux (10)	1–5	ES Doubs (8)
33.	Amancey-Bolandoz-Chantrans Foot (10)	2–5	FC Liévremont-Arçon (9)
34.	ES Saugette Entre-Roches (8)	4–1	Travailleurs Turcs Pontarlier (9)
35.	US Laveron (11)	2–3 (a.e.t.)	SC Villers-le-Lac (9)
36.	FC Neuilly (10)	0–2	CCS Val d'Amour Mont-sous-Vaudrey (8)
37.	FC Sennecey-lès-Dijon (11)	0–9	AS Genlis (9)
38.	AS Montbarrey (11)	2–7	ALC Longvic (8)
39.	Triangle d'Or Jura Foot (8)	4–0	Jura Stad' FC (8)
40.	FC Remilly (11)	0–1	PS Dole-Crissey (9)
41.	US Trois Monts (9)	3–0	CSL Chenôve (8)
42.	ASD des DOM (11)	– (Note: ASD des DOM penalised for fielding unregistered players. CLL Échenon qualify.)	CLL Échenon (10)
43.	FC Saulon-Corcelles (9)	3–3 (2–4 p)	FC Ouges-Fénay (10)
44.	ISS Pleure (11)	3–0	AS Foucherans (9)
45.	FR Rahon (11)	1–6	EF Villages (9)
46.	FC Plaine 39 (10)	1–3	FC Aiserey-Izeure (9)
47.	FC Fénay (11)	0–3	AS St Usage St Jean-de-Losne (8)
48.	AS Plateau de La Barêche (11)	3–1	AS Sâone-Mamirolle (9)
49.	FC Mouchard-Arc-et-Senans (10)	0–0 (5–4 p)	ES Dannemarie (9)
50.	FC Brenne-Orain (10)	2–1 (a.e.t.)	AS Moissey (11)
51.	ASC Velotte (10)	1–5	AEP Pouilley-les-Vignes (8)
52.	SC Clémenceau Besançon (10)	0–3	AS Besançon Espérance (11)
53.	AS Beure (10)	3–5	Thise-Chalezeule FC (11)
54.	FC Amagney Marchaux (11)	0–10	US Avanne-Aveney (10)
55.	FC Aiglepierre (9)	0–2	FC Rochefort-Amange (8)
56.	FC Premier Plateau (10)	3–2 (a.e.t.)	FC Val de Loue (9)
57.	US Doubs Sud (10)	0–2	FC Grand Besançon (8)
58.	Dinamo Dijon (11)	0–9	Fontaine-lès-Dijon FC (8)
59.	Espérance Arc-Gray (8)	8–2	FC Grésilles (10)
60.	Tilles FC (10)	1–0	CS Portusien (9)
61.	SC Jussey (10)	2–2 (4–3 p)	FC La Gourgeonne (10)
62.	Val de Norge FC (11)	5–2	AS Til-Châtel (11)
63.	US Marey-Cussey (11)	3–1	FC Mirebellois-Pontailler-Lamarche (8)
64.	FC Ahuy (11)	0–2	FC Vingeanne (10)
65.	FC Aignay Baigneux (11)	2–4 (a.e.t.)	ES Marnaysienne (8)
66.	US Scey-sur-Saône (9)	3–4	Spartak Bressey (10)
67.	ASFC Daix (10)	1–3 (a.e.t.)	AS Perrouse (8)
68.	FC Fleury-la-Vallée (11)	1–3	CA St Georges (9)
69.	AS Pouilly-sur-Loire (9)	3–0	CSP Charmoy (9)
70.	Franco-Portugais Sens (10)	1–0	US Toucycoise (9)
71.	AS Gurgy (9)	1–0	CS Corbigeois (9)
72.	FC Persévérante Pontoise (11)	6–1	JS St Révérien (11)
73.	FC Gatinais en Bourgogne (10)	1–0	FC St Julien-du-Sault (11)
74.	ASL St Père (9)	1–3	Cosnois FC (10)
75.	US Lormoise (11)	0–3	US Joigny (10)
76.	FC Aigles Auxerre (12)	0–3	US Cerisiers (8)
77.	St Fargeau SF (10)	1–4	SC Gron Véron (10)
78.	Aillant SF (10)	2–3	ASC Pougues (9)
79.	FC St Euphrône (12)	0–2	Union Châtillonniase Colombine (8)
80.	FC St Rémy-le Montbard (9)	4–1	FC Chevannes (8)
81.	ES Val d'Ource (11)	0–9	ES Appoigny (8)
82.	UF Tonnerrois (10)	1–5	Monéteau FC (9)
83.	ES Morvandelle (11)	0–2	Entente Châtel-Gérard Nucerien (10)
84.	FC Coulanges-la-Vineuse (10)	0–2	SC Vitteaux (11)
85.	Montbard Venarey (9)	3–1	US Varennes (9)
86.	FC Champs-sur-Yonne (9)	4–3	AS Chablis (8)
87.	ASUC Migennes (8)	2–1	US Semur-Époisses (9)
88.	Olympique Montmorot (9)	0–2	IS Bresse Nord (10)
89.	AS Aromas (10)	0–4	Entente Sud-Revermont (8)
90.	FC Charette (10)	3–4 (a.e.t.)	US Lessard-en-Bresse (9)
91.	ES Branges (10)	0–4	RC Bresse Sud (8)
92.	AS Arinthod (9)	2–5	AS Sornay (8)
93.	FC Pont de la Pyle (10)	0–5	CS Mervans (8)
94.	SC Châteaurenaud (10)	0–5	AS Sagy (8)
95.	FC Macornay Val de Sorne (10)	5–3	IS St Usuge (10)
96.	FC Épervans (10)	6–0	JS Simard (11)
97.	US San-Martinoise (11)	0–3	AFC Cuiseaux-Champagnat (11)
98.	ES St Germain-du-Plaine-Baudrières (10)	0–3	JS Bey (12)
99.	US Revermontaise (11)	0–5	FR St Maur (10)
100.	AS Vaux-lès-Saint-Claude (10)	2–1	US Coteaux de Seille (8)
101.	AS St Vincent-Bragny (9)	3–0	Les Gachères FC (10)
102.	AS Chassy-Marly-Oudry (10)	1–1 (2–4 p)	Sud Foot 71 (9)
103.	AS Ciry-le-Noble (9)	3–0	US Varenne-St Yan (10)
104.	AS Neuvyssois (10)	1–2	US Bourbon-Lancy FPT (10)
105.	AS Vendenesse-sur-Arroux (11)	1–4	Digoin FCA (8)
106.	FC Vitry-en-Charollais (10)	0–2	Génelard Perrecy FC (9)
107.	AS Céramistes Digoin (11)	1–4	JF Palingeois (9)
108.	US Rigny-sur-Arroux (9)	11–2	ES Toulon-sur-Arroux (10)
109.	FC Nevers Banlay (10)	1–0	FC Sud Loire Allier 09 (9)
110.	AS Fourchambault (9)	6–0	ALSC Montigny-aux-Amognes (10)
111.	US Luzy-Millay (10)	0–5	AS Guerigny Urzy Chaulgnes (8)
112.	ASA Vauzelles (8)	2–3	FC Nevers 58 (8)
113.	US Cercycoise (9)	0–3	RC Nevers-Challuy Sermoise (8)
114.	AS Garchizy (8)	1–0	Étoile Sud Nivernaise 58 (8)
115.	CS Bazois (11)	2–6	US Coulanges-lès-Nevers (10)
116.	UF La Machine (9)	6–2	FREP Luthenay (9)
117.	AS Charrin (10)	0–2 (a.e.t.)	FC Château-Chinon-Arleuf (10)
118.	RC Flacé Mâcon (10)	7–0	Dun Sornin (9)
119.	US St Martin-Senozan (10)	0–1	US St Bonnet/La Guiche (8)
120.	Sancé FC (11)	0–4	FC Sennecé-lès-Mâcon (9)
121.	CS Tramayes (11)	3–2	JS Crechoise (10)
122.	SR Clayettois (8)	3–1 (a.e.t.)	US Sennecey-le-Grand et Son Canton (8)
123.	JS Mâconnaise (8)	1–2 (a.e.t.)	SC Mâcon (9)
124.	FC Clessé (10)	0–3	US Cluny (8)
125.	FC Dompierre-Matour (10)	3–0	FC Igéen (11)
126.	FC Joncy (11)	1–3	FC La Roche-Vineuse (10)
127.	ASL Lux (9)	4–1	EJS Épinacoise (10)
128.	FC Sombernon-Gissey (11)	1–3	FC Corgoloin-Ladoix (8)
129.	ASC Manlay (11)	4–1	EFC Demigny (10)
130.	AS Perrigny-lès-Dijon (12)	0–3	US Meursault (8)
131.	ASI Vougeot (11)	1–0	AS Lacanche (10)
132.	US Nolay (11)	4–4 (4–5 p)	US Savigny-Chassagne (9)
133.	JS Rully (9)	0–1	AS Pouilly-en-Auxois (8)
134.	FC Verdunois (11)	1–3	US Crissotine (9)
135.	UFC de l'Ouche (11)	0–1	AS Gevrey-Chambertin (10)
136.	AS Canton du Bligny-sur-Ouche (11)	1–3	ASC Plombières-Lès-Dijon (9)
137.	FC Marmagne (10)	1–2	St Vallier Sport (10)
138.	ASJ Torcéenne (11)	1–3	Chalon ACF (8)
139.	AS Cheminots Chagnotins (10)	8–0	ES Pouilloux (10)
140.	FLL Gergy-Verjux (9)	3–3 (6–5 p)	Team Montceau Foot (10)
141.	FC Sassenay-Virey-Lessard-Fragnes (9)	3–0	US Givry-St Désert (10)
142.	St Forgeot-Dracy Sport (11)	2–3	AS Mellecey-Mercurey (11)
143.	SC Etangois (10)	2–1	Flamboyants Football Chalonnais (11)
144.	AS Varennes-le-Grand (11)	0–0 (4–2 p)	JS Ouroux-sur-Saône (9)
145.	FC St Rémy (9)	3–1	FC Bois du Verne (10)
146.	Montcenis FC (10)	3–2 (a.e.t.)	SLF Sevrey (11)
147.	US St Sernin-du-Bois (7)	1–0	ESA Breuil (8)
148.	US Buxynoise (10)	5–4	US Blanzy (10)

=== Second round ===
These matches were played on 24 and 25 August 2019.

Second round results: Bourgogne-Franche-Comté
Tie no	Home team (tier)	Score	Away team (tier)
1.	ES Exincourt-Taillecourt (10)	0–3	US Les Écorces (7)
2.	US Pont-de-Roide (7)	3–0	US Larians-et-Munans (7)
3.	FAC Lougres (12)	1–3	US Sous-Roches (8)
4.	ES Trévillers-Thiébouhans (11)	1–7	Haute-Lizaine Pays d'Héricourt (7)
5.	AS Guyans-Vennes (10)	2–1	AS Audincourt (7)
6.	FC Villars-sous-Écot (9)	1–0 (Note: Tie reversed with agreement of both clubs.)	Longevelle SC (10
7.	ASL Autechaux-Roide (10)	0–1	FC L'Isle-sur-le-Doubs (8)
8.	FC Le Russey (11)	1–1 (5–6 p)	ES Pays Maîchois (8)
9.	RC Voujeaucourt (10)	1–6	FC Bart (7)
10.	Olympique Courcelles-lès-Montbéliard (9)	2–3	FC Noidanais (7)
11.	AS Essert (11)	3–4 (a.e.t.)	US Franchevelle (9)
12.	FC Colombe (10)	1–3	US Sochaux (7)
13.	Bessoncourt Roppe Club Larivière (8)	1–3 (a.e.t.)	JS Lure (7)
14.	AS Bavilliers (8)	3–1	SC Lure (9)
15.	SC St Loup-Corbenay-Magnoncourt (9)	1–3	AS Mélisey-St Barthélemy (8)
16.	FC Pays Minier (10)	1–3 (a.e.t.)	SG Héricourt (8)
17.	CS Beaucourt (9)	1–0	US Châtenois-les-Forges (7)
18.	Arcade Foot (9)	1–2 (a.e.t.)	ES Les Fonges 91 (10)
19.	AS Château de Joux (9)	3–1 (a.e.t.)	US Crotenay Combe d'Ain (10)
20.	Entente Le Châteleu (11)	0–5	AS Levier (7)
21.	FC Haut Jura (9)	1–3	FCC La Joux (7)
22.	ES Doubs (8)	6–0	SC Villers-le-Lac (9)
23.	FC Liévremont-Arçon (9)	0–1	ES Saugette Entre-Roches (8)
24.	EF Villages (9)	5–0	Triangle d'Or Jura Foot (8)
25.	CCS Val d'Amour Mont-sous-Vaudrey (8)	6–3	AS Genlis (9)
26.	PS Dole-Crissey (9)	2–3	AS St Usage St Jean-de-Losne (8)
27.	ISS Pleure (11)	1–2	ALC Longvic (8)
28.	FC Aiserey-Izeure (9)	1–1 {(4–5 p)	CLL Échenon (10)
29.	CS Auxonnais (7)	1–1 (3–4 p)	Chevigny St Sauveur (7)
30.	US Trois Monts (9)	3–2	FC Ouges-Fénay (10)
31.	FC Mouchard-Arc-et-Senans (10)	2–6	Poligny-Grimont FC (7)
32.	FC Grand Besançon (8)	1–3	US Avanne-Aveney (10)
33.	Thise-Chalezeule FC (11)	2–4 (a.e.t.)	AS Plateau de La Barêche (11)
34.	FC Brenne-Orain (10)	1–0	AEP Pouilley-les-Vignes (8)
35.	FC Premier Plateau (10)	1–3	FC Montfaucon-Morre-Gennes-La Vèze (7)
36.	AS Besançon Espérance (11)	3–4 (a.e.t.)	FC Rochefort-Amange (8)
37.	FC Vingeanne (10)	3–1	SC Jussey (10)
38.	AS Perrouse (8)	0–2	US Rioz-Étuz-Cussey (7)
39.	US Marey-Cussey (11)	1–2	Val de Norge FC (11)
40.	Fontaine-lès-Dijon FC (8)	3–0	Espérance Arc-Gray (8)
41.	Spartak Bressey (10)	0–3	US Cheminots Dijonnais (7)
42.	Tilles FC (10)	1–2 (a.e.t.)	ES Marnaysienne (8)
43.	AS Gurgy (9)	2–1	US Cerisiers (8)
44.	AS Pouilly-sur-Loire (9)	0–1	FC Persévérante Pontoise (11)
45.	ASC Pougues (9)	3–5	US Joigny (10)
46.	Franco-Portugais Sens (10)	3–2 (a.e.t.)	SC Gron Véron (10)
47.	CA St Georges (9)	4–0	FC Gatinais en Bourgogne (10)
48.	Cosnois FC (10)	2–3	AS Magny (7)
49.	Union Châtillonniase Colombine (8)	5–4 (a.e.t.)	Montbard Venarey (9)
50.	Entente Châtel-Gérard Nucerien (10)	1–1 (2–4 p)	FC Champs-sur-Yonne (9)
51.	ASUC Migennes (8)	5–4 (a.e.t.)	AS Clamecy (7)
52.	SC Vitteaux (11)	1–4	ES Appoigny (8)
53.	Monéteau FC (9)	3–4	FC St Rémy-le Montbard (9)
54.	RC Bresse Sud (8)	1–2	Jura Lacs Foot (7)
55.	FC Épervans (10)	0–1	CS Mervans (8)
56.	AFC Cuiseaux-Champagnat (11)	2–0	FC Macornay Val de Sorne (10)
57.	US Lessard-en-Bresse (9)	3–2	AS Sagy (8)
58.	AS Vaux-lès-Saint-Claude (10)	3–0	AS Sornay (8)
59.	FR St Maur (10)	1–3	Entente Sud-Revermont (8)
60.	IS Bresse Nord (10)	2–3	JS Bey (12)
61.	US Bourbon-Lancy FPT (10)	1–1 (5–4 p)	Sud Foot 71 (9)
62.	Génelard Perrecy FC (9)	2–1	AS St Vincent-Bragny (9)
63.	JF Palingeois (9)	2–1	AS Ciry-le-Noble (9)
64.	Digoin FCA (8)	1–4	US Rigny-sur-Arroux (9)
65.	AS Guerigny Urzy Chaulgnes (8)	3–6	UF La Machine (9)
66.	FC Nevers 58 (8)	2–0	AS St Benin (7)
67.	FC Château-Chinon-Arleuf (10)	0–1	AS Fourchambault (9)
68.	US Coulanges-lès-Nevers (10)	1–2	FC Nevers Banlay (10)
69.	RC Nevers-Challuy Sermoise (8)	2–1 (a.e.t.)	AS Garchizy (8)
70.	FC La Roche-Vineuse (10)	0–3	RC Flacé Mâcon (10)
71.	SC Mâcon (9)	3–2 (a.e.t.)	AS Chapelloise (7)
72.	US St Bonnet/La Guiche (8)	2–1	US Cluny (8)
73.	CS Tramayes (11)	3–4	FC Dompierre-Matour (10)
74.	FC Sennecé-lès-Mâcon (9)	1–4 (a.e.t.)	SR Clayettois (8)
75.	ASC Plombières-Lès-Dijon (9)	1–3	CL Marsannay-la-Côte (7)
76.	ASI Vougeot (11)	2–5 (a.e.t.)	AS Châtenoy-le-Royal (7)
77.	AS Gevrey-Chambertin (10)	3–0	ASL Lux (9)
78.	US Meursault (8)	2–2 (5–4 p)	US Savigny-Chassagne (9)
79.	US Crissotine (9)	0–1	ASPTT Dijon (7)
80.	ASC Manlay (11)	2–3	FC Corgoloin-Ladoix (8)
81.	AS Pouilly-en-Auxois (8)	2–3	AS Beaune (7)
82.	Montcenis FC (10)	0–4	JO Le Creusot (7)
83.	AS Mellecey-Mercurey (11)	0–6	US St Sernin-du-Bois (7)
84.	St Vallier Sport (10)	3–1	FC Sassenay-Virey-Lessard-Fragnes (9)
85.	SC Etangois (10)	2–0	FC St Rémy (9)
86.	AS Cheminots Chagnotins (10)	5–0	AS Varennes-le-Grand (11)
87.	CS Sanvignes (7)	0–1	FR Saint Marcel (7)
88.	Chalon ACF (8)	4–0	JS Montchanin ODRA (7)
89.	FLL Gergy-Verjux (9)	2–3	US Buxynoise (10)

=== Third round ===
These matches were played on 14 and 15 September 2019.

Third round results: Bourgogne-Franche-Comté
Tie no	Home team (tier)	Score	Away team (tier)
1.	SC Etangois (10)	0–6	AS Beaune (7)
2.	JF Palingeois (9)	0–4	FC Montceau Bourgogne (5)
3.	US Buxynoise (10)	2–3	US St Bonnet/La Guiche (8)
4.	SC Mâcon (9)	0–2	JO Le Creusot (7)
5.	FC Dompierre-Matour (10)	0–6	SR Clayettois (8)
6.	US Cheminots Paray (6)	2–3	FC Gueugnon (5)
7.	US Rigny-sur-Arroux (9)	0–1	UF Mâconnais (6)
8.	RC Flacé Mâcon (10)	1–4	Génelard Perrecy FC (9)
9.	St Vallier Sport (10)	2–2 (5–4 p)	US St Sernin-du-Bois (7)
10.	US Bourbon-Lancy FPT (10)	0–2	US Meursault (8)
11.	CL Marsannay-la-Côte (7)	2–3 (a.e.t.)	Union Châtillonniase Colombine (8)
12.	FC Corgoloin-Ladoix (8)	0–3	ASC Saint-Apollinaire (6)
13.	EF Villages (9)	2–0	AS Gevrey-Chambertin (10)
14.	FC Vingeanne (10)	3–1	ES Marnaysienne (8)
15.	ALC Longvic (8)	2–2 (9–8 p)	Chevigny St Sauveur (7)
16.	ASPTT Dijon (7)	0–1	ES Fauverney-Rouvres-Bretenière (6)
17.	Val de Norge FC (11)	0–3	US Cheminots Dijonnais (7)
18.	FC St Rémy-le Montbard (9)	0–1	AS Quetigny (6)
19.	Avallon FCO (6)	0–1	Is-Selongey Football (5)
20.	Fontaine-lès-Dijon FC (8)	1–6	Besançon Football (5)
21.	AS St Usage St Jean-de-Losne (8)	3–2 (a.e.t.)	US Lessard-en-Bresse (9)
22.	FC Rochefort-Amange (8)	0–4	Racing Besançon (5)
23.	CLL Échenon (10)	3–1	AFC Cuiseaux-Champagnat (11)
24.	AS Châtenoy-le-Royal (7)	0–2 (Note: Tie reversed from original draw.)	FC Chalon (6)
25.	JS Bey (12)	1–2	CCS Val d'Amour Mont-sous-Vaudrey (8)
26.	Jura Dolois Foot (5)	1–0	Bresse Jura Foot (6)
27.	Jura Lacs Foot (7)	4–3 (a.e.t.)	Chalon ACF (8)
28.	RC Lons-le-Saunier (6)	3–2	FR Saint Marcel (7)
29.	FC Brenne-Orain (10)	3–2	AS Vaux-lès-Saint-Claude (10)
30.	Entente Sud-Revermont (8)	1–2 (a.e.t.)	US Trois Monts (9)
31.	AS Cheminots Chagnotins (10)	3–0	CS Mervans (8)
32.	Franco-Portugais Sens (10)	1–3	FC Nevers 58 (8)
33.	ASUC Migennes (8)	3–5 (a.e.t.)	Paron FC (6)
34.	AS Gurgy (9)	0–2	US La Charité (6)
35.	UF La Machine (9)	1–2	Stade Auxerrois (6)
36.	US Joigny (10)	1–3 (a.e.t.)	ES Appoigny (8)
37.	FC Nevers Banlay (10)	– (Note: Match abandoned after 84 minutes, with the scoreline 1–3 at the time, due to a mass brawl between players. FC Nevers Banlay penalised. CA St Georges qualify.)	CA St Georges (9)
38.	FC Sens (5)	1–2	Union Cosnoise Sportive (6)
39.	FC Persévérante Pontoise (11)	1–3	RC Nevers-Challuy Sermoise (8)
40.	AS Fourchambault (9)	0–2	AS Magny (7)
41.	FC Champs-sur-Yonne (9)	0–3	Sud Nivernais Imphy Decize (6)
42.	ES Les Fonges 91 (10)	0–2	FC Montfaucon-Morre-Gennes-La Vèze (7)
43.	AS Plateau de La Barêche (11)	1–1 (4–3 p)	Poligny-Grimont FC (7)
44.	AS Guyans-Vennes (10)	2–1	AS Château de Joux (9)
45.	US Rioz-Étuz-Cussey (7)	0–1	US Saint-Vit (6)
46.	AS Ornans (6)	2–0	FCC La Joux (7)
47.	US Avanne-Aveney (10)	1–2 (a.e.t.)	ES Saugette Entre-Roches (8)
48.	CA Pontarlier (5)	4–0	FC Champagnole (6)
49.	AS Levier (7)	0–2	FC Morteau-Montlebon (5)
50.	ES Pays Maîchois (8)	0–2	ES Doubs (8)
51.	FC Bart (7)	2–5	FC Noidanais (7)
52.	Entente Roche-Novillars (5)	0–1	FC Vesoul (6)
53.	SG Héricourt (8)	2–1 (a.e.t.)	FC Valdahon-Vercel (5)
54.	FC L'Isle-sur-le-Doubs (8)	4–1	Haute-Lizaine Pays d'Héricourt (7)
55.	AS Baume-les-Dames (6)	2–4	FC 4 Rivières 70 (6)
56.	AS Mélisey-St Barthélemy (8)	0–1	AS Bavilliers (8)
57.	FC Villars-sous-Écot (9)	0–1	US Les Écorces (7)
58.	US Sochaux (7)	2–1	US Pont-de-Roide (7)
59.	JS Lure (7)	1–5	FC Grandvillars (6)
60.	CS Beaucourt (9)	1–5	AS Belfort Sud (6)
61.	US Sous-Roches (8)	3–1	US Franchevelle (9)

=== Fourth round ===
These matches were played on 28 and 29 September 2019.

Fourth round results: Bourgogne-Franche-Comté
Tie no	Home team (tier)	Score	Away team (tier)
1.	SR Clayettois (8)	1–2	RC Nevers-Challuy Sermoise (8)
2.	US St Bonnet/La Guiche (8)	1–2	Stade Auxerrois (6)
3.	AS Magny (7)	2–2 (5–6 p)	Union Cosnoise Sportive (6)
4.	St Vallier Sport (10)	0–4	Paron FC (6)
5.	Génelard Perrecy FC (9)	1–6	FC Montceau Bourgogne (5)
6.	FC Nevers 58 (8)	– (Note: Match abandoned in the 89th minute, with the scoreline 1–1, after repeated incidents of flares or firecrackers being thrown onto the pitch. FC Nevers 58 penalised, FC Chalon qualify.)	FC Chalon (6)
7.	JO Le Creusot (7)	1–2 (a.e.t.)	Sud Nivernais Imphy Decize (6)
8.	CA St Georges (9)	1–2	FC Gueugnon (5)
9.	ES Appoigny (8)	0–5	Louhans-Cuiseaux FC (4)
10.	UF Mâconnais (6)	0–1	Is-Selongey Football (5)
11.	AS Cheminots Chagnotins (10)	0–3	US La Charité (6)
12.	RC Lons-le-Saunier (6)	5–0	Jura Lacs Foot (7)
13.	US Saint-Vit (6)	0–4	Racing Besançon (5)
14.	AS Quetigny (6)	1–3	AS Beaune (7)
15.	US Meursault (8)	0–3	ASC Saint-Apollinaire (6)
16.	US Trois Monts (9)	1–2	EF Villages (9)
17.	AS St Usage St Jean-de-Losne (8)	1–2	ES Fauverney-Rouvres-Bretenière (6)
18.	CLL Échenon (10)	2–2 (8–7 p)	Union Châtillonniase Colombine (8)
19.	ALC Longvic (8)	0–1	Jura Dolois Foot (5)
20.	FC Brenne-Orain (10)	2–0 (a.e.t.)	FC Vingeanne (10)
21.	CCS Val d'Amour Mont-sous-Vaudrey (8)	1–5	Jura Sud Foot (4)
22.	FC 4 Rivières 70 (6)	3–1 (a.e.t.)	US Cheminots Dijonnais (7)
23.	AS Bavilliers (8)	0–2	ASM Belfort (4)
24.	FC Montfaucon-Morre-Gennes-La Vèze (7)	2–4	FC Morteau-Montlebon (5)
25.	ES Doubs (8)	0–2	FC Grandvillars (6)
26.	FC Noidanais (7)	1–8	Besançon Football (5)
27.	AS Plateau de La Barêche (11)	1–1 (4–5 p)	FC L'Isle-sur-le-Doubs (8)
28.	AS Belfort Sud (6)	2–1	US Sochaux (7)
29.	AS Guyans-Vennes (10)	2–3	US Sous-Roches (8)
30.	ES Saugette Entre-Roches (8)	1–6	FC Vesoul (6)
31.	US Les Écorces (7)	0–4	CA Pontarlier (5)
32.	SG Héricourt (8)	0–4	AS Ornans (6)

=== Fifth round ===
These matches were played on 12 and 13 October 2019.

Fifth round results: Bourgogne-Franche-Comté
Tie no	Home team (tier)	Score	Away team (tier)
1.	AS Beaune (7)	0–4	Louhans-Cuiseaux FC (4)
2.	Union Cosnoise Sportive (6)	2–4	US La Charité (6)
3.	Is-Selongey Football (5)	2–1	Paron FC (6)
4.	FC Montceau Bourgogne (5)	2–1	ASC Saint-Apollinaire (6)
5.	FC Gueugnon (5)	3–1	Sud Nivernais Imphy Decize (6)
6.	EF Villages (9)	0–1	FC Chalon (6)
7.	Stade Auxerrois (6)	0–2	Jura Sud Foot (4)
8.	CLL Échenon (10)	0–2	RC Nevers-Challuy Sermoise (8)
9.	FC Morteau-Montlebon (5)	2–3	ASM Belfort (4)
10.	FC Brenne-Orain (10)	0–5	RC Lons-le-Saunier (6)
11.	FC L'Isle-sur-le-Doubs (8)	2–4 (a.e.t.)	FC Grandvillars (6)
12.	FC Vesoul (6)	1–3	FC 4 Rivières 70 (6)
13.	Racing Besançon (5)	4–2	ES Fauverney-Rouvres-Bretenière (6)
14.	AS Ornans (6)	0–4	Jura Dolois Foot (5)
15.	Besançon Football (5)	0–0 (5–4 p)	CA Pontarlier (5)
16.	US Sous-Roches (8)	1–4	AS Belfort Sud (6)

=== Sixth round ===
These matches were played on 26 and 27 October 2019.

Sixth round results: Bourgogne-Franche-Comté
Tie no	Home team (tier)	Score	Away team (tier)
1.	Jura Dolois Foot (5)	0–1	FC Montceau Bourgogne (5)
2.	RC Lons-le-Saunier (6)	3–2	Is-Selongey Football (5)
3.	Jura Sud Foot (4)	2–0	Besançon Football (5)
4.	FC Gueugnon (5)	0–1	Racing Besançon (5)
5.	RC Nevers-Challuy Sermoise (8)	0–1	AS Belfort Sud (6)
6.	FC 4 Rivières 70 (6)	2–1	FC Chalon (6)
7.	ASM Belfort (4)	1–0	Louhans-Cuiseaux FC (4)
8.	US La Charité (6)	2–1	FC Grandvillars (6)
