= 2017–18 Coupe de France preliminary rounds, Bourgogne-Franche-Comté =

The 2017–18 Coupe de France preliminary rounds, Bourgogne-Franche-Comté make up the qualifying competition to decide which teams from the Bourgogne-Franche-Comté region teams take part in the main competition from the seventh round.

== First round ==
The matches in Bourgogne-Franche-Comté were played on 19 and 20 August 2017. Some tiers are not yet known because lower level divisions have not been finalised.

First round results: Bourgogne-Franche-Comté

Tie no	Home team (tier)	Score	Away team (tier)
1.	AS Gurgy (11)	1–1 (1–3 p)	CA St Georges (9)
2.	ASUC Migennes (7)	3–1	US Varennes (8)
3.	Monéteau FC (9)	2–0	ES Héry (10)
4.	AJ Sautourienne (9)	1–3	ES Appoigny (9)
5.	FC Fleury-la-Vallée (11)	1–3	CSP Charmoy (9)
6.	AS Chablis (9)	2–1	FC Chevannes (9)
7.	SC Malay-le-Grand (10)	3–4	US Joigny (8)
8.	Eveil Sénonais (11)	0–3 (Note: Game won through forfeit)	FC Gatinais en Bourgogne (9)
9.	FC Sens (7)	2–0	SC Gron (9)
10.	FC St Julien-du-Sault (10)	0–4	RC Sens (8)
11.	AS Véron (9)	2–5 (a.e.t.)	US Cerisiers (7)
12.	SC Lindry (10)	0–1 (a.e.t.)	US Canton Charny (9)
13.	US Toucycoise (8)	1–1 (5–4 p)	Avallon Vauban FC (8)
14.	St Fargeau SF (10)	4–0	Montillot FC (10)
15.	Vaillante Prémery (11)	1–4	AS Clamecy (7)
16.	Union Cosnois Sportive (7)	3–1	CS Corbigeois (8)
17.	Cosnois FC (11)	5–0	ALSC Montigny-aux-Amognes (11)
18.	FC Champs-sur-Yonne (9)	2–1	FC Chassignelles Lezinnes (10)
19.	SC Vitteaux (11)	1–9	AS Magny (8)
20.	US Semur en Epoisses (8)	2–3	Union Châtillonniase Colombine (9)
21.	FC Aignay Baigneux (11)	1–7	Montbard Venarey (7)
22.	FC St Rémy (10)	3–2	ES Val d'Ource (10)
23.	AJ Salives Léry Minot (12)	0–6	FC Sombernon-Gissey (11)
24.	AS Guerigny Urzy Chaulgnes (9)	1–1 (5–4 p)	US Sauvigny-les-Bois (10)
25.	ES Druy-Béard (11)	0–4	FC Nevers 58 (8)
26.	AS Fourchambault (8)	2–2 (5–4 p)	ASC Pougues (9)
27.	ASA Vauzelles (8)	1–0	US Coulanges-lès-Nevers (9)
28.	US St Pierre (10)	1–5	RC Nevers-Challuy Sermoise (7)
29.	UF La Machine (8)	1–0	US Rigny-sur-Arroux (9)
30.	AS St Agnan (11)	1–2	AS Neuvyssois (10)
31.	US Luzy-Millay (9)	1–2	SC Etangois (9)
32.	Digoin FCA (7)	3–1	Dornes Neuville Olympique (8)
33.	Grury Issy Foot (11)	0–3	AS Charrin (10)
34.	AS Chassy-Marly-Oudry (10)	0–4	ES Toulon-sur-Arroux (10)
35.	ES Lucenay/Cossaye (10)	2–2 (4–2 p)	RC Guerreaux-La Motte (10)
36.	AS St Benin (8)	2–0	US Bourbon-Lancy FPT (8)
37.	Val de Norge FC (9)	2–5	Fontaine-lès-Dijon FC (7)
38.	AS Poussots (12)	0–4	UL Française Européenne Dijon (8)
39.	AS Gevrey-Chambertin (10)	1–6	CL Marsannay-la-Côte (8)
40.	FC Talant (10)	2–0	UFC de l'Ouche (11)
41.	Dinamo Dijon (11)	1–3	FC Ahuy (11)
42.	ASC Plombières-Lès-Dijon (8)	4–2	ASFC Daix (9)
43.	FC Grésilles (9)	2–3	CSL Chenôve (9)
44.	EF Villages (10)	1–1 (1–3 p)	US Cheminots Dijonnais (7)
45.	AS Lacanche (10)	1–3	FC Chassagne-Montrachet (9)
46.	ASC Manlay (11)	0–5	AS Beaune (7)
47.	US Meursault (8)	1–0	JS Rully (9)
48.	FC Corgoloin-Ladoix (10)	7–1	FC Autun (10)
49.	AS Cheminots Chagnotins (11)	2–0	AS Canton du Bligny-sur-Ouche (11)
50.	EJS Épinacoise (11)	5–0	St Forgeot-Dracy Sport (10)
51.	AS Pouilly (9)	3–0	Autun Benfica (9)
52.	Réveil Is-sur-Tille (8)	2–1	Espérance Arc-Gray (9)
53.	AS Til-Châtel (11)	1–8	FC 4 Rivières 70 (7)
54.	US Rigny (10)	0–4	US Champlitte (8)
55.	AS Noidanaise (10)	4–2	ES Combeaufontaine-Lavoncourt-Laitre (10)
56.	US Marey-Cussey (10)	0–3	FC Les 2 Vels (8)
57.	SC Jussey (10)	2–3 (a.e.t.)	US Scey-sur-Saône (8)
58.	FC Vingeanne (11)	1–3	Chevigny St Sauveur (7)
59.	CS Portusien (9)	2–4 (3–4 p)	FC Mirebellois-Pontailler-Lamarche (8)
60.	FC Saulon-Corcelles (9)	0–3	CS Auxonnais (7)
61.	FC Remilly-sur-Tille (10)	3–1	AS Genlis (8)
62.	AS St Usage St Jean-de-Losne (8)	4–0	FC Aiserey-Izeure (9)
63.	FC Neuilly (9)	2–3	CLL Échenon (10)
64.	Tilles FC (10)	2–0	US Trois Monts (9)
65.	AS Foucherans (9)	3–3 (7–8 p)	PS Dole-Crissey (10)
66.	Spartak Bressey (11)	0–7	ES Fauverney-Rouvres-Bretenière (7)
67.	ASPTT Grand-Lons-Jura (11)	5–2	SC Châteaurenaud (10)
68.	Bresse Jura Foot (7)	0–0 (5–4 p)	US Coteaux de Seille (7)
69.	IS Bresse Nord (10)	0–6	RC Lons-le-Saunier (6)
70.	US Revermontaise (11)	0–3	ES Branges (10)
71.	US Cuisery (11)	0–3	Entente Sud-Revermont (8)
72.	AFC Cuiseaux-Champagnat (10)	2–1	US Beaurepaire (11)
73.	AS Sornay (8)	2–2 (8–7 p)	CS Mervans (9)
74.	US St Germain-du-Bois (11)	0–3	AS Sagy (8)
75.	US Lessard-en-Bresse (11)	1–0	IS St Usuge (10)
76.	US Saillenard (11)	1–0	CS Varennois (11)
77.	ASJ Torcéenne (11)	7–2 (a.e.t.)	ES Pouilloux (10)
78.	JO Le Creusot (9)	1–3	US St Sernin-du-Bois (7)
79.	AS Ciry-le-Noble (10)	3–4 (a.e.t.)	St Vallier Sport (10)
80.	CS Sanvignes (7)	3–2	US Cluny (8)
81.	JS Montchanin ODRA (8)	3–0	JF Palingeois (8)
82.	US Blanzy (9)	1–0	FC Bois du Verne (10)
83.	AS St Vincent-Bragny (9)	3–0	FC Joncy (11)
84.	Montcenis FC (10)	0–3	AS Perrecy-les-Forges (8)
85.	CS Orion (11)	3–1 (a.e.t.)	FC Marmagne (11)
86.	FLL Gergy-Verjux (10)	1–5	SC Mâcon (9)
87.	US St Martin-Senozan (11)	0–3	JS Crechoise (8)
88.	RC Flacé Mâcon (11)	1–6	US St Bonnet/La Guiche (8)
89.	SR Clayettois (9)	0–1	CO Chauffailles (8)
90.	FC Dompierre-Matour (11)	3–4	US Varenne-St Yan (10)
91.	AS St Albain (11)	0–3	US Sennecey-le-Grand et Son Canton (9)
92.	Sud Foot 71 (8)	3–1	JS Mâconnaise (8)
93.	FC Sennecé-lès-Mâcon (11)	2–0	FC Hurigny (9)
94.	FC Abergement-de-Cuisery (8)	1–2	Dun Sornin (9)
95.	FC Igéen (10)	3–1	CS Tramayes (11)
96.	FC St Rémy (10)	0–2	ASL Lux (8)
97.	ES St Germain-du-Plaine-Baudrières (11)	0–2	SLF Sevrey (11)
98.	FC Prés-St Jean (11)	3–0	FC Sassenay-Virey-Lessard-Fragnes (9)
99.	FC Épervans (10)	1–3	AS Châtenoy-le-Royal (7)
100.	FC Verdunois (10)	1–4	AS Varennes-le-Grand (10)
101.	US Buxynoise (10)	0–10	Chalon ACF (8)
102.	US Crissotine (9)	4–2	JS Bey (10)
103.	US San-Martinoise (11)	1–3	FR Saint Marcel (7)
104.	AS Tournus (10)	0–2	JS Ouroux-sur-Saône (9)
105.	FC Vesoul (7)	7–1	ES Marnaysienne (8)
106.	ASC Planoise-St Ferjeux (8)	7–0	US Pusey (10)
107.	AS Perrouse (9)	1–6	FC Noidanais (7)
108.	AS Byans-Osselle (10)	0–4	ES Dannemarie (8)
109.	US Près de Vaux (11)	2–0	FC Colombe (10)
110.	Amancey-Bolandoz-Chantrans Foot (11)	1–5	US Larians-et-Munans (7)
111.	AS Beure (13)	5–4 (a.e.t.)	US Rioz-Étuz-Cussey (7)
112.	FC Aiglepierre (9)	2–1	CS Frasne (9)
113.	AS Château de Joux (9)	6–3	FC Val de Loue (9)
114.	FC Massif Haut Doubs (11)	3–3 (3–2 p)	Jura Nord Foot (8)
115.	FC Brenne-Orain (10)	1–2	Poligny-Grimont FC (7)
116.	US Laveron (13)	0–1	FC Rochefort-Amange (10)
117.	FC Lac-Remoray-Vaux (10)	1–2	FC Mouchard-Arc-et-Senans (8)
118.	AS Mouthe (13)	0–7	AS Mont D'Usiers (9)
119.	Drugeon Sports (11)	0–5	ES Doubs (9)
120.	US Perrigny-Conliège (11)	0–3	FCC La Joux (9)
121.	AS Aromas (10)	4–1	FR Rahon (11)
122.	AS Vaux-lès-Saint-Claude (9)	4–8 (a.e.t.)	AS Morbier (8)
123.	CS Passenans (12)	0–1	FC Plaine 39 (10)
124.	FC Pont de la Pyle (10)	1–3	CCS Val d'Amour Mont-sous-Vaudrey (8)
125.	ES Sirod (10)	3–1	Jura Lacs Foot (7)
126.	US Crotenay Combe d'Ain (9)	0–1	Triangle d'Or Jura Foot (8)
127.	FC Haut Jura (10)	2–2 (3–1 p)	Olympique Montmorot (8)
128.	AEP Pouilley-les-Vignes (8)	2–0	AS Orchamps-Vennes (8)
129.	AS Pierrefontaine et Laviron (11)	3–4	SC Villers-le-Lac (10)
130.	AS Étalans Vernierfontaine (10)	0–2	FC Pirey-École-Valentin (9)
131.	ES Les Sapins (10)	0–2	ES Entre Roches (8)
132.	US Les Fins (11)	0–4	AS Avoudrey (10)
133.	US Passavant (11)	0–7	FC Montfaucon-Morre-Gennes-La Vèze (7)
134.	Étoile Saugette la Chaux de Gilley (10)	0–3	US Nancray-Osse (10)
135.	ES Lièvremont (9)	4–0	Espérance Auxon-Miserey (10)
136.	AS Guyans-Vennes (10)	2–0	FC Émagny-Pin (11)
137.	US Montbéliardaise (8)	1–0	RC Voujeaucourt (9)
138.	US St Hippolyte (11)	2–6 (a.e.t.)	ES Exincourt-Taillecourt (8)
139.	FC Villars-sous-Écot (8)	1–2	US Les Écorces (7)
140.	FC Le Russey (11)	0–3	AS Audincourt (7)
141.	SR Villars-sous-Dampjoux (10)	0–5	ES Pays Maîchois (8)
142.	US Les Fontenelles (11)	0–14	US Pont-de-Roide (7)
143.	FC Étupes (10)	2–1	FC Forges Audincourt (10)
144.	Olympique Courcelles-lès-Montbéliard (10)	1–3	ASL Autechaux-Roide (9)
145.	Longevelle SC (10)	1–2	FC L'Isle-sur-le-Doubs (7)
146.	US Franchevelle (10)	2–3	SG Héricourt (8)
147.	SC Lure (11)	1–3	SC St Loup-Corbenay-Magnoncourt (9)
148.	AS Mélisey-St Barthélemy (8)	1–3	Haute-Lizaine Pays d'Héricourt (7)
149.	USC Sermamagny (11)	2–4	AS Luxeuil (8)
150.	SR Delle (11)	2–1	CS Beaucourt (8)
151.	AS Rougegoutte (9)	0–1	AS Belfort Sud (7)
152.	FC Seloncourt (10)	3–2 (a.e.t.)	FC Haute Vallée de l'Ognon (10)
153.	AS Hérimoncourt (9)	5–2	US Arcey (10)
154.	US Aillevillers (9)	0–9	FC Giro-Lepuix (8)
155.	Olympique Montbéliard (8)	1–1 (4–3 p)	ASFC Belfort (8)
156.	AS Méziré-Fesches-le-Châtel (8)	0–4	JS Lure (7)
157.	FC Pays Minier (10)	1–2	SCM Valdoie (7)
158.	AS Fougerolles (9)	0–2	US Châtenois-les-Forges (7)
159.	Bessoncourt Roppe Club Larivière (9)	1–2	FC Breuches (10)
160.	AS Présentevillers-Ste Marie (10)	5–1	AS Essert (10)
161.	AS Danjoutin-Andelnans-Méroux (8)	2–1	US Sous-Roches (8)
162.	ES Montenois (11)	0–4	AS Bavilliers (8)

== Second round ==
These matches were played on 26 and 27 August 2017.

Second round results: Bourgogne-Franche-Comté

Tie no	Home team (tier)	Score	Away team (tier)
1.	Monéteau FC (9)	1–3	FC Sens (7)
2.	FC Gatinais en Bourgogne (9)	2–1	RC Sens (8)
3.	Aillant SF (10)	1–4	US Joigny (8)
4.	AJ Villeneuvienne (12)	2–8	ASUC Migennes (7)
5.	CA St Georges (9)	3–0	US Cerisiers (7)
6.	ES Appoigny (9)	3–3 (4–5 p)	CSP Charmoy (9)
7.	US Canton Charny (9)	0–2	AS Chablis (9)
8.	St Fargeau SF (10)	4–1	JS Marzy (10)
9.	Union Châtillonniase Colombine (9)	2–3 (a.e.t.)	FC Champs-sur-Yonne (9)
10.	FC Sombernon-Gissey (11)	0–7	Union Cosnois Sportive (7)
11.	AS Tonnerroise (11)	0–5	AS Magny (8)
12.	AS Guerigny Urzy Chaulgnes (9)	1–6	Montbard Venarey (7)
13.	Cosnois FC (11)	2–3 (a.e.t.)	US Toucycoise (8)
14.	FC St Rémy (10)	2–1	AS Clamecy (7)
15.	SC Etangois (9)	0–6	Digoin FCA (7)
16.	AS Neuvyssois (10)	3–3 (5–4 p)	AS Charrin (10)
17.	ASA Vauzelles (8)	1–0 (a.e.t.)	AS St Benin (8)
18.	FREP Luthenay (9)	0–3	RC Nevers-Challuy Sermoise (7)
19.	FC Nevers 58 (8)	4–1	AS Fourchambault (8)
20.	CIE Imphy (9)	5–2	ES Lucenay/Cossaye (10)
21.	ES Toulon-sur-Arroux (10)	0–5	UF La Machine (8)
22.	Fontaine-lès-Dijon FC (7)	1–3	US Cheminots Dijonnais (7)
23.	FC Corgoloin-Ladoix (10)	6–4 (a.e.t.)	UL Française Européenne Dijon (8)
24.	CSL Chenôve (9)	12–1	FC Ahuy (11)
25.	FC Talant (10)	4–0	EFC Demigny (11)
26.	EJS Épinacoise (11)	0–9	AS Beaune (7)
27.	US Meursault (8)	7–0	AS Pouilly (9)
28.	AS Cheminots Chagnotins (11)	0–2	ASC Plombières-Lès-Dijon (8)
29.	CL Marsannay-la-Côte (8)	1–4	FC Chassagne-Montrachet (9)
30.	FC 4 Rivières 70 (7)	6–0	CLL Échenon (10)
31.	AS Noidanaise (10)	0–2	FC Mirebellois-Pontailler-Lamarche (8)
32.	PS Dole-Crissey (10)	1–3	CS Auxonnais (7)
33.	Jura Stad' FC (9)	3–3 (3–0 p)	ES Fauverney-Rouvres-Bretenière (7)
34.	Réveil Is-sur-Tille (8)	2–1	AS St Usage St Jean-de-Losne (8)
35.	Tilles FC (10)	1–2	Chevigny St Sauveur (7)
36.	FC Les 2 Vels (8)	5–1	US Champlitte (8)
37.	FC Remilly-sur-Tille (10)	3–0	US Scey-sur-Saône (8)
38.	FC Vitry-en-Charollais (9)	0–3	AS Perrecy-les-Forges (8)
39.	ASJ Torcéenne (11)	2–3	AS St Vincent-Bragny (9)
40.	St Vallier Sport (10)	1–4	JS Crechoise (8)
41.	SC Mâcon (9)	4–1	AS St Léger-sur-Dheune (9)
42.	CS Orion (11)	1–9	US St Bonnet/La Guiche (8)
43.	US Sennecey-le-Grand et Son Canton (9)	5–3	CO Chauffailles (8)
44.	Dun Sornin (9)	1–4	US St Sernin-du-Bois (7)
45.	US Varenne-St Yan (10)	0–1	CS Sanvignes (7)
46.	FC Igéen (10)	0–7	JS Montchanin ODRA (8)
47.	FC Sennecé-lès-Mâcon (11)	2–1 (a.e.t.)	Sud Foot 71 (8)
48.	ASL Lux (8)	3–2 (a.e.t.)	FC La Roche-Vineuse (9)
49.	US Blanzy (9)	1–5	ESA Breuil (8)
50.	JS Ouroux-sur-Saône (9)	0–1	FR Saint Marcel (7)
51.	FC Prés-St Jean (11)	2–1	US Crissotine (9)
52.	AS Varennes-le-Grand (10)	5–7	Entente Sud-Revermont (8)
53.	US Lessard-en-Bresse (11)	0–1	AS Châtenoy-le-Royal (7)
54.	AS Sagy (8)	0–1	Chalon ACF (8)
55.	US Bantanges-Rancy (10)	3–2	SLF Sevrey (11)
56.	ES Branges (10)	2–2 (3–1 p)	US Saillenard (11)
57.	AFC Cuiseaux-Champagnat (10)	1–5	Bresse Jura Foot (7)
58.	ASPTT Grand-Lons-Jura (11)	4–1	Sancé FC (10)
59.	AS Sornay (8)	1–4	RC Lons-le-Saunier (6)
60.	AS Beure (13)	1–2	AS Château de Joux (9)
61.	CCS Val d'Amour Mont-sous-Vaudrey (8)	1–8	FCC La Joux (9)
62.	ES Sirod (10)	0–2	FC Aiglepierre (9)
63.	FC Vesoul (7)	3–4	FC Noidanais (7)
64.	FC Rochefort-Amange (10)	0–0 (2–4 p)	FC Mouchard-Arc-et-Senans (8)
65.	US Larians-et-Munans (7)	1–2	ES Dannemarie (8)
66.	FC Plaine 39 (10)	2–4	Poligny-Grimont FC (7)
67.	AS Mont D'Usiers (9)	2–3	ES Doubs (9)
68.	FC Haut Jura (10)	1–3	AS Morbier (8)
69.	ASC Velotte (10)	2–8	ASC Planoise-St Ferjeux (8)
70.	FC Massif Haut Doubs (11)	5–1	US Près de Vaux (11)
71.	AS Aromas (10)	1–3	Triangle d'Or Jura Foot (8)
72.	ES Réchésy (11)	2–4	AS Hérimoncourt (9)
73.	ASL Autechaux-Roide (9)	1–2	SG Héricourt (8)
74.	US Pont-de-Roide (7)	6–2	Olympique Montbéliard (8)
75.	AS Avoudrey (10)	2–3	AS Guyans-Vennes (10)
76.	AS Bavilliers (8)	1–0	US Châtenois-les-Forges (7)
77.	FC L'Isle-sur-le-Doubs (7)	5–2 (a.e.t.)	FC Giro-Lepuix (8)
78.	SR Delle (11)	3–0	AS Luxeuil (8)
79.	AS Présentevillers-Ste Marie (10)	0–1	JS Lure (7)
80.	US Les Écorces (7)	3–2 (a.e.t.)	AS Danjoutin-Andelnans-Méroux (8)
81.	ES Entre Roches (8)	3–2 (a.e.t.)	ES Exincourt-Taillecourt (8)
82.	FC Seloncourt (10)	1–0	FC Étupes (10)
83.	SC Villers-le-Lac (10)	2–1	AEP Pouilley-les-Vignes (8)
84.	FC Bart (7)	4–0	US Montbéliardaise (8)
85.	ES Pays Maîchois (8)	7–0	ES Lièvremont (9)
86.	FC Pirey-École-Valentin (9)	3–1 (a.e.t.)	US Nancray-Osse (10)
87.	Rougement Concorde (10)	0–2	AS Belfort Sud (7)
88.	SC St Loup-Corbenay-Magnoncourt (9)	0–1	Haute-Lizaine Pays d'Héricourt (7)
89.	FC Breuches (10)	1–3	SCM Valdoie (7)
90.	AS Nord Territoire (9)	1–3	AS Audincourt (7)
91.	AS Sâone-Mamirolle (8)	1–1 (2–4 p)	FC Montfaucon-Morre-Gennes-La Vèze (7)

== Third round ==
These matches were played on 9 and 10 September 2017.

Third round results: Bourgogne-Franche-Comté

Tie no	Home team (tier)	Score	Away team (tier)
1.	CSP Charmoy (9)	4–4 (5–4 p)	FC Sens (7)
2.	FC Champs-sur-Yonne (9)	1–2	FC Gatinais en Bourgogne (9)
3.	AS Chablis (9)	0–3	US La Charité (6)
4.	ASA Vauzelles (8)	1–8	CO Avallon (5)
5.	Montbard Venarey (7)	0–1	SC Selongey (5)
6.	AS Magny (8)	4–0	Union Cosnois Sportive (7)
7.	ASUC Migennes (7)	1–3	AS Garchizy (6)
8.	Paron FC (6)	4–0	St Fargeau SF (10)
9.	CA St Georges (9)	1–4	RC Nevers-Challuy Sermoise (7)
10.	US Toucycoise (8)	1–2	Stade Auxerrois (6)
11.	US Joigny (8)	0–0 (5–3 p)	FC Nevers 58 (8)
12.	US St Bonnet/La Guiche (8)	1–2	US Cheminots Paray (6)
13.	CIE Imphy (9)	1–3	AS Neuvyssois (10)
14.	AS St Vincent-Bragny (9)	2–1	JS Crechoise (8)
15.	AS Beaune (7)	3–0	AS Perrecy-les-Forges (8)
16.	US St Sernin-du-Bois (7)	2–2 (8–9 p)	JS Montchanin ODRA (8)
17.	ESA Breuil (8)	1–3 (a.e.t.)	Sud Nivernais Imphy Decize (6)
18.	FR Saint Marcel (7)	4–2	AS Chapelloise (6)
19.	CS Sanvignes (7)	0–3	FC Gueugnon (5)
20.	FC Sennecé-lès-Mâcon (11)	0–2	Digoin FCA (7)
21.	UF La Machine (8)	2–4	ASC Saint-Apollinaire (5)
22.	FC Mirebellois-Pontailler-Lamarche (8)	0–5	Jura Dolois Foot (5)
23.	ASC Plombières-Lès-Dijon (8)	3–2	FC Talant (10)
24.	FC Chassagne-Montrachet (9)	2–0	Chevigny St Sauveur (7)
25.	Jura Stad' FC (9)	2–4 (a.e.t.)	US Cheminots Dijonnais (7)
26.	AS Quetigny (5)	5–2	FC Remilly-sur-Tille (10)
27.	US Meursault (8)	3–1	ALC Longvic (6)
28.	FC Corgoloin-Ladoix (10)	2–3	Chalon ACF (8)
29.	CSL Chenôve (9)	6–0	FC St Rémy (10)
30.	ASL Lux (8)	1–0	Réveil Is-sur-Tille (8)
31.	US Sennecey-le-Grand et Son Canton (9)	2–1	ASPTT Dijon (6)
32.	FC Mouchard-Arc-et-Senans (8)	1–2	AS Châtenoy-le-Royal (7)
33.	Entente Sud-Revermont (8)	2–0	RC Lons-le-Saunier (6)
34.	FC Aiglepierre (9)	1–1 (7–6 p)	FC Champagnole (6)
35.	Poligny-Grimont FC (7)	0–2	Entente Roche-Novillars (6)
36.	AS Morbier (8)	0–5	Louhans-Cuiseaux FC (5)
37.	Triangle d'Or Jura Foot (8)	1–3	UF Mâconnais (6)
38.	Bresse Jura Foot (7)	5–1	CS Auxonnais (7)
39.	US Bantanges-Rancy (10)	0–7	US Saint-Vit (5)
40.	SC Mâcon (9)	4–0	ES Branges (10)
41.	ASPTT Grand-Lons-Jura (11)	1–2	FC Prés-St Jean (11)
42.	ES Doubs (9)	1–2 (a.e.t.)	AS Levier (6)
43.	CA Pontarlier (5)	5–0	FC Valdahon-Vercel (6)
44.	ES Dannemarie (8)	1–3	FC 4 Rivières 70 (7)
45.	SC Villers-le-Lac (10)	2–3	AS Baume-les-Dames (6)
46.	AS Guyans-Vennes (10)	2–4	US Les Écorces (7)
47.	FC Montfaucon-Morre-Gennes-La Vèze (7)	3–4	ASC Planoise-St Ferjeux (8)
48.	FC Les 2 Vels (8)	2–3	AS Ornans (6)
49.	ES Entre Roches (8)	1–8	Racing Besançon (5)
50.	FC Massif Haut Doubs (11)	1–4	FC Pirey-École-Valentin (9)
51.	AS Château de Joux (9)	2–1	FCC La Joux (9)
52.	AS Hérimoncourt (9)	3–4	FC Bart (7)
53.	ES Pays Maîchois (8)	0–2	FC Morteau-Montlebon (6)
54.	FC Noidanais (7)	3–1 (a.e.t.)	FC L'Isle-sur-le-Doubs (7)
55.	SG Héricourt (8)	4–4 (3–5 p)	FC Grandvillars (6)
56.	Haute-Lizaine Pays d'Héricourt (7)	0–1	US Pont-de-Roide (7)
57.	FC Seloncourt (10)	1–4	AS Belfort Sud (7)
58.	SR Delle (11)	0–0 (5–4 p)	SCM Valdoie (7)
59.	AS Audincourt (7)	0–2	Besançon Football (5)
60.	US Sochaux (6)	0–0 (5–3 p)	SC Clémenceau Besançon (5)
61.	JS Lure (7)	1–2	AS Bavilliers (8)

== Fourth round ==
These matches were played on 23 and 24 September 2017.

Fourth round results: Bourgogne-Franche-Comté

Tie no	Home team (tier)	Score	Away team (tier)
1.	AS Neuvyssois (10)	0–3	US La Charité (6)
2.	UF Mâconnais (6)	3–1 (a.e.t.)	AS Ornans (6)
3.	AS Levier (6)	0–3	FC Noidanais (7)
4.	US Les Écorces (7)	0–3	CA Pontarlier (5)
5.	AS Baume-les-Dames (6)	2–3 (a.e.t.)	Bresse Jura Foot (7)
6.	Entente Sud-Revermont (8)	2–4	SC Mâcon (9)
7.	Paron FC (6)	0–3	FC Montceau Bourgogne (4)
8.	Stade Auxerrois (6)	4–0	AS Châtenoy-le-Royal (7)
9.	AS St Vincent-Bragny (9)	1–2 (a.e.t.)	AS Magny (8)
10.	US Joigny (8)	0–1	FC Gueugnon (5)
11.	CO Avallon (5)	4–0	US Cheminots Paray (6)
12.	Sud Nivernais Imphy Decize (6)	7–0	JS Montchanin ODRA (8)
13.	CSL Chenôve (9)	3–2	Louhans-Cuiseaux FC (5)
14.	CSP Charmoy (9)	3–1	Digoin FCA (7)
15.	US Meursault (8)	0–8	Jura Sud Foot (4)
16.	AS Garchizy (6)	1–2 (a.e.t.)	ASC Saint-Apollinaire (5)
17.	FC Chassagne-Montrachet (9)	0–3	FC 4 Rivières 70 (7)
18.	FC Prés-St Jean (11)	1–4	ASC Plombières-Lès-Dijon (8)
19.	FC Gatinais en Bourgogne (9)	0–3	RC Nevers-Challuy Sermoise (7)
20.	US Pont-de-Roide (7)	3–1	AS Belfort Sud (7)
21.	SR Delle (11)	0–4	Besançon Football (5)
22.	Chalon ACF (8)	3–2	ASL Lux (8)
23.	Entente Roche-Novillars (6)	1–2	AS Beaune (7)
24.	SC Selongey (5)	2–1	Jura Dolois Foot (5)
25.	FC Bart (7)	0–4	Racing Besançon (5)
26.	FR Saint Marcel (7)	3–0	US Cheminots Dijonnais (7)
27.	AS Bavilliers (8)	2–1	US Sochaux (6)
28.	FC Aiglepierre (9)	0–2	ASM Belfort (4)
29.	US Sennecey-le-Grand et Son Canton (9)	0–7	AS Quetigny (5)
30.	FCC La Joux (9)	3–2 (a.e.t.)	US Saint-Vit (5)
31.	ASC Planoise-St Ferjeux (8)	1–2 (a.e.t.)	FC Grandvillars (6)
32.	FC Pirey-École-Valentin (9)	1–2	FC Morteau-Montlebon (6)

== Fifth round ==
These matches were played on 7 and 8 October 2017.

Fifth round results: Bourgogne-Franche-Comté

Tie no	Home team (tier)	Score	Away team (tier)
1.	AS Quetigny (5)	0–0 (4–2 p)	Besançon Football (5)
2.	Sud Nivernais Imphy Decize (6)	3–1	SC Selongey (5)
3.	UF Mâconnais (6)	2–1	US Pont-de-Roide (7)
4.	Jura Sud Foot (4)	4–1	Racing Besançon (5)
5.	Bresse Jura Foot (7)	0–1	ASM Belfort (4)
6.	AS Beaune (7)	0–0 (5–4 p)	FC Montceau Bourgogne (4)
7.	FC Grandvillars (6)	1–0	FC Noidanais (7)
8.	RC Nevers-Challuy Sermoise (7)	0–2	Stade Auxerrois (6)
9.	Chalon ACF (8)	2–8	CO Avallon (5)
10.	FR Saint Marcel (7)	1–4 (a.e.t.)	ASC Saint-Apollinaire (5)
11.	CSP Charmoy (9)	0–5	FC Gueugnon (5)
12.	FCC La Joux (9)	0–4	FC Morteau-Montlebon (6)
13.	AS Bavilliers (8)	0–4	CA Pontarlier (5)
14.	SC Mâcon (9)	1–4	FC 4 Rivières 70 (7)
15.	CSL Chenôve (9)	4–0	AS Magny (8)
16.	ASC Plombières-Lès-Dijon (8)	0–1 (a.e.t.)	US La Charité (6)

== Sixth round ==
These matches were played on 21 and 22 October 2017.

Sixth round results: Bourgogne-Franche-Comté

Tie no	Home team (tier)	Score	Away team (tier)
1.	CO Avallon (5)	3–1	Jura Sud Foot (4)
2.	CA Pontarlier (5)	6–1	UF Mâconnais (6)
3.	AS Beaune (7)	0–1 (a.e.t.)	ASM Belfort (4)
4.	FC Morteau-Montlebon (6)	2–1	US La Charité (6)
5.	FC 4 Rivières 70 (7)	3–2	AS Quetigny (5)
6.	Stade Auxerrois (6)	0–4	Sud Nivernais Imphy Decize (6)
7.	CSL Chenôve (9)	0–1	FC Gueugnon (5)
8.	ASC Saint-Apollinaire (5)	0–1	FC Grandvillars (6)
