= 2018–19 Coupe de France preliminary rounds, Bourgogne-Franche-Comté =

The 2018–19 Coupe de France preliminary rounds, Bourgogne-Franche-Comté was the qualifying competition to decide which teams from the leagues of the Bourgogne-Franche-Comté region of France took part in the main competition from the seventh round.

== First round ==
These matches were played on 18 and 19 August 2018.

First round results: Bourgogne-Franche-Comté
Tie no	Home team (tier)	Score	Away team (tier)
1.	SCM Valdoie (8)	1–5	AS Bavilliers (8)
2.	AS Pierrefontaine et Laviron (10)	0–1	RC Voujeaucourt (10)
3.	CS Frasne (10)	0–1	ES Doubs (8)
4.	AS Mélisey-St Barthélemy (8)	1–0	Bessoncourt Roppe Club Larivière (8)
5.	ES Montenois (11)	4–1	AS Rougegoutte (10)
6.	US Aillevillers (10)	0–3 (Note: Tie won by forfeit.)	FC Breuches (10)
7.	AS Fougerolles (10)	2–5	ASFC Belfort (8)
8.	AS Chèvremont (10)	3–4	SC Lure (10)
9.	JS Lure (8)	6–4 (a.e.t.)	US Franchevelle (9)
10.	SC St Loup-Corbenay-Magnoncourt (9)	6–2	FC Pays Minier (10)
11.	ES Exincourt-Taillecourt (9)	5–0	AS Luxeuil (8)
12.	AS Présentevillers-Ste Marie (10)	3–4	AS Nord Territoire (9)
13.	Olympique Courcelles-lès-Montbéliard (10)	2–3	FC Bart (8)
14.	USC Sermamagny (11)	0–3	FC Giro-Lepuix (8)
15.	US Sous-Roches (8)	4–1	SG Héricourt (8)
16.	AS Meslières-Glay-Dannemarie (12)	1–6	AS Orchamps-Vennes (8)
17.	US Bavans (11)	0–1 (a.e.t.)	AS Méziré-Fesches-le-Châtel (9)
18.	SR Delle (10)	2–1	CS Beaucourt (9)
19.	ES Pays Maîchois (8)	0–3	FC L'Isle-sur-le-Doubs (8)
20.	GLS Club 90 (11)	2–4	Longevelle SC (10)
21.	US St Hippolyte (11)	3–0	Olympique Montbéliard (9)
22.	AS Feule-Solemont (11)	0–3	FC Le Russey (11)
23.	ASL Autechaux-Roide (10)	3–1 (a.e.t.)	AS Avoudrey (10)
24.	FC Villars-sous-Écot (8)	4–0	AS Hérimoncourt (9)
25.	US Les Fins (11)	1–0	FC Seloncourt (10)
26.	ES Sirod (10)	5–3 (a.e.t.)	FC Lac-Remoray-Vaux (10)
27.	US Laveron (11)	4–5	FC Haut Jura (9)
28.	SC Villers-le-Lac (10)	2–2 (5–6 p)	AS Mont D'Usiers (10)
29.	ES Entre Roches (8)	2–3 (a.e.t.)	AS Château de Joux (9)
30.	AS Mouthe (12)	0–9	AS Morbier (8)
31.	Entente Le Châteleu (11)	1–5	ES Lièvremont (10)
32.	Drugeon Sports (11)	1–6	US Crotenay Combe d'Ain (9)
33.	Étoile Saugette la Chaux de Gilley (10)	0–3	Travailleurs Turcs Pontarlier (9)
34.	FC Massif Haut Doubs (11)	3–9	FCC La Joux (8)
35.	US Avanne-Aveney (10)	1–2	ES Les Sapins (10)
36.	AS Beure (11)	2–2 (2–4 p)	Amancey-Bolandoz-Chantrans Foot (11)
37.	AS Sâone-Mamirolle (8)	2–1 (Note: Tie switched at the request of both clubs.)	AS Étalans Vernierfontaine (10)
38.	AS Byans-Osselle (10)	3–3 (5–6 p)	FC Aiglepierre (9)
39.	FC Val de Loue (9)	2–0	FC Mouchard-Arc-et-Senans (9)
40.	ES Les Fonges 91 (11)	0–3	Triangle d'Or Jura Foot (8)
41.	AS Plateau de La Barêche (11)	2–3	US Nancray-Osse (10)
42.	CS Portusien (9)	3–2	ES Dannemarie (8)
43.	AS Moissey (11)	2–2 (4–3 p)	ASC Velotte (10)
44.	FC Grand Besançon (9)	4–2	ES Marnaysienne (8)
45.	FC Colombe (10)	0–3	AS Perrouse (9)
46.	FC Rochefort-Amange (9)	5–2 (a.e.t.)	FC Orchamps Olof Palme (10)
47.	AEP Pouilley-les-Vignes (8)	1–0 (a.e.t.)	SC Clémenceau Besançon (9)
48.	CCS Val d'Amour Mont-sous-Vaudrey (8)	2–0	Jura Nord Foot (8)
49.	AS Arinthod (11)	1–2	US Lessard-en-Bresse (9)
50.	AFC Cuiseaux-Champagnat (10)	4–3	Jura Lacs Foot (8)
51.	FC Gevry (11)	3–2	SC Châteaurenaud (10)
52.	US San-Martinoise (10)	2–2 (5–3 p)	JS Simard (11)
53.	US Bantanges-Rancy (11)	3–3 (4–5 p)	AS St Julien-sur-Suran (10)
54.	US Perrigny-Conliège (11)	3–2	CS Mervans (10)
55.	US Revermontaise (11)	5–0	AS Aromas (10)
56.	AS Vaux-lès-Saint-Claude (10)	0–4	IS Bresse Nord (10)
57.	FC Charette (11)	2–3	Olympique Montmorot (8)
58.	AS Sagy (8)	2–0	AS Sornay (8)
59.	FC Verdunois (11)	3–5	FC Abergement-de-Cuisery (9)
60.	IS St Usuge (10)	1–0	ES Branges (11)
61.	ASPTT Grand-Lons-Jura (11)	0–3	FC Brenne-Orain (10)
62.	Monéteau FC (9)	3–4	AS Chablis (8)
63.	FC Aigles Auxerre (12)	0–4 (Note: Match abandoned after 45 minutes, with the scoreline 0–4, due to FC Aigles Auxerre having insufficient players to continue. AS Pouilly qualify.)	AS Pouilly-sur-Loire (10)
64.	CSP Charmoy (9)	4–1	CS Corbigeois (9)
65.	Cosnois FC (11)	3–4	St Fargeau SF (10)
66.	AJ Sautourienne (9)	0–2	ES Appoigny (9)
67.	FC Châtel-Censoir (11)	0–6	US Varennes (9)
68.	CA St Georges (9)	4–5 (a.e.t.)	FC Chevannes (9)
69.	AS Gurgy (10)	0–1	FC Champs-sur-Yonne (10)
70.	FC Fleury-la-Vallée (11)	6–2	US Canton Charny (10)
71.	FC Persévérante Pontoise (11)	0–3	US Toucycoise (9)
72.	AS Véron (10)	3–0	FC St Julien-du-Sault (11)
73.	Aillant SF (11)	3–2	RC Sens (9)
74.	Jeunesse Senonaise (10)	0–3	US Joigny (10)
75.	Franco-Portugais Sens (10)	0–0 (8–9 p)	FC Gatinais en Bourgogne (10)
76.	EE St Valérien (11)	0–15	ASUC Migennes (8)
77.	Sancé FC (11)	2–3	US Cluny (8)
78.	SC Mâcon (10)	5–2	CS Tramayes (11)
79.	FC Sennecé-lès-Mâcon (10)	6–1	US St Bonnet/La Guiche (8)
80.	FC Clessé (10)	2–1	JS Mâconnaise (8)
81.	JS Crechoise (9)	2–0	FC Hurigny (10)
82.	FC Dompierre-Matour (11)	2–4	SR Clayettois (9)
83.	SLF Sevrey (11)	0–2	ASL Lux (9)
84.	FC Épervans (10)	0–4	US Buxynoise (10)
85.	AS St Léger-sur-Dheune (10)	0–3	Chalon ACF (8)
86.	ESA Breuil (8)	5–1	FC St Rémy (9)
87.	ES St Germain-du-Plaine-Baudrières (11)	1–0 (a.e.t.)	AS Varennes-le-Grand (11)
88.	US Crissotine (10)	2–1	FC Sassenay-Virey-Lessard-Fragnes (9)
89.	FLL Gergy-Verjux (10)	0–3	US Sennecey-le-Grand et Son Canton (8)
90.	AS Mellecey-Mercurey (11)	1–2	JS Ouroux-sur-Saône (9)
91.	FC Nevers Banlay (10)	2–1	US Coulanges-lès-Nevers (9)
92.	ASC Pougues (9)	5–2	FREP Luthenay (9)
93.	JS Marzy (10)	1–2	UF La Machine (8)
94.	RC Maupas (11)	0–9	Étoile Sud Nivernaise 58 (9)
95.	ALSC Montigny-aux-Amognes (11)	1–3	AS Guerigny Urzy Chaulgnes (9)
96.	US St Pierre (9)	1–1 (3–5 p)	FC Nevers 58 (8)
97.	US Bourbon-Lancy FPT (9)	2–3 (a.e.t.)	FC Sud Loire Allier 09 (10)
98.	ASA Vauzelles (8)	3–1	AS Fourchambault (9)
99.	AS Ciry-le-Noble (10)	1–0	AS Neuvyssois (10)
100.	US Rigny-sur-Arroux (9)	3–2	AS Perrecy-les-Forges (9)
101.	ES Toulon-sur-Arroux (10)	1–3 (a.e.t.)	AS St Vincent-Bragny (9)
102.	Dun Sornin (9)	0–2	Digoin FCA (8)
103.	US Varenne-St Yan (10)	3–1	AS Chassy-Marly-Oudry (11)
104.	AS Charrin (10)	0–0 (3–4 p)	US Luzy-Millay (9)
105.	US Génelard-Martigny (11)	1–0	CO Chauffailles (9)
106.	Sud Foot 71 (8)	6–0	JF Palingeois (8)
107.	Team Montceau Foot (11)	1–2	Montcenis FC (10)
108.	St Vallier Sport (10)	5–1	ES Pouilloux (10)
109.	FC Joncy (11)	1–5	SC Etangois (10)
110.	US Blanzy (10)	2–0	CS Orion (10)
111.	FC Bois du Verne (10)	2–3 (a.e.t.)	ASJ Torcéenne (10)
112.	FC Marmagne (10)	1–0 (a.e.t.)	JO Le Creusot (8)
113.	FC Vingeanne (11)	5–3 (a.e.t.)	FC Les 2 Vels (9)
114.	Tilles FC (10)	0–3	Espérance Arc-Gray (8)
115.	AS St Usage St Jean-de-Losne (8)	4–2	AS Genlis (8)
116.	FR Rahon (11)	1–2 (a.e.t.)	US Rigny (10)
117.	SC Jussey (10)	3–0	FC Talant (11)
118.	US Scey-sur-Saône (8)	2–1	US Trois Monts (9)
119.	AS Foucherans (9)	3–2	PS Dole-Crissey (10)
120.	US Brazey (11)	2–2 (4–2 p)	US Marey-Cussey (11)
121.	FC Plaine 39 (10)	3–2 (a.e.t.)	FC Aiserey-Izeure (9)
122.	FC Mirebellois-Pontailler-Lamarche (8)	2–1	Jura Stad' FC (9)
123.	Ruffey Ste Marie FC (12)	1–5	FC Corgoloin-Ladoix (9)
124.	AS Poussots (11)	0–2	AS Cheminots Chagnotins (10)
125.	AS Gevrey-Chambertin (10)	2–1	US Savigny-Chassagne (9)
126.	FC Saulon-Corcelles (9)	0–2 (a.e.t.)	CL Marsannay-la-Côte (8)
127.	AS Canton du Bligny-sur-Ouche (12)	2–1	CLL Échenon (10)
128.	US Nolay (12)	2–3	Spartak Bressey (11)
129.	EFC Demigny (11)	3–0	UL Française Européenne Dijon (9)
130.	FC Neuilly (10)	1–2	FC Autun (9)
131.	ASC Manlay (10)	3–0	EJS Épinacoise (10)
132.	US Meursault (8)	5–1	JS Rully (9)
133.	Val de Norge FC (10)	4–1	ASFR Thury (11)
134.	FC Grésilles (10)	0–3	CSL Chenôve (8)
135.	UF Tonnerrois (10)	6–1	ES Val d'Ource (10)
136.	AS Lacanche (10)	0–2	Montbard Venarey (8)
137.	UFC de l'Ouche (11)	1–5	Avallon Vauban FC (8)
138.	SC Vitteaux (11)	0–6	ASFC Daix (9)
139.	FC Aignay Baigneux (11)	0–2	AS Pouilly-en-Auxois (9)
140.	Dinamo Dijon (11)	3–0	FC Sombernon-Gissey (11)
141.	ASD des DOM (11)	1–3	Union Châtillonniase Colombine (9)
142.	FC St Rémy-le Montbard (10)	4–0	US Semur-Époisses (8)
143.	EF Villages (10)	13–0	FC Ahuy (12)
144.	FC Remilly-sur-Tille (11)	0–5	ASC Plombières-Lès-Dijon (8)

== Second round ==
These matches were played on 25 and 26 August 2018.

Second round results: Bourgogne-Franche-Comté
Tie no	Home team (tier)	Score	Away team (tier)
1.	FC Giro-Lepuix (8)	1–0	SC St Loup-Corbenay-Magnoncourt (9)
2.	US Les Écorces (7)	2–4 (a.e.t.)	AS Danjoutin-Andelnans-Méroux (7)
3.	JS Lure (8)	2–1	Haute-Lizaine Pays d'Héricourt (7)
4.	Amancey-Bolandoz-Chantrans Foot (11)	3–1	US Nancray-Osse (10)
5.	AS St Julien-sur-Suran (10)	1–3	US Coteaux de Seille (7)
6.	Entente Sud-Revermont (7)	2–0	US Perrigny-Conliège (11)
7.	US Cluny (8)	0–1	FR Saint Marcel (7)
8.	FC Sennecé-lès-Mâcon (10)	2–1	US Crissotine (10)
9.	JS Crechoise (9)	0–3	AS Châtenoy-le-Royal (7)
10.	ES St Germain-du-Plaine-Baudrières (11)	1–4	ASL Lux (9)
11.	JS Ouroux-sur-Saône (9)	1–5	ESA Breuil (8)
12.	Chalon ACF (8)	1–3	SR Clayettois (9)
13.	SC Mâcon (10)	2–3	US Sennecey-le-Grand et Son Canton (8)
14.	AS Canton du Bligny-sur-Ouche (12)	1–4	ASFC Daix (9)
15.	Avallon Vauban FC (8)	5–4 (a.e.t.)	CL Marsannay-la-Côte (8)
16.	US Buxynoise (10)	6–3	FC Clessé (10)
17.	Montcenis FC (10)	0–1	ASC Pougues (9)
18.	ASJ Torcéenne (10)	0–5	CS Sanvignes (7)
19.	AS Guerigny Urzy Chaulgnes (9)	4–1	FC Sud Loire Allier 09 (10)
20.	St Vallier Sport (10)	1–6	ASA Vauzelles (8)
21.	AS St Vincent-Bragny (9)	1–0	SC Etangois (10)
22.	US Blanzy (10)	1–3 (a.e.t.)	Digoin FCA (8)
23.	FC Marmagne (10)	0–1	US St Sernin-du-Bois (7)
24.	UF La Machine (8)	0–2	AS St Benin (7)
25.	AS Ciry-le-Noble (10)	1–4	JS Montchanin ODRA (7)
26.	US Génelard-Martigny (11)	0–3	RC Nevers-Challuy Sermoise (7)
27.	AS Cheminots Chagnotins (10)	2–0	Dinamo Dijon (11)
28.	CSL Chenôve (8)	1–2	AS Beaune (7)
29.	CSP Charmoy (9)	2–1	AS Magny (7)
30.	FC Gatinais en Bourgogne (10)	0–6	AS Chablis (8)
31.	FC Fleury-la-Vallée (11)	3–2	AS Véron (10)
32.	St Fargeau SF (10)	1–1 (4–2 p)	US Varennes (9)
33.	US Toucycoise (9)	0–1	ES Appoigny (9)
34.	Aillant SF (11)	1–8	Union Cosnoise Sportive (7)
35.	ASUC Migennes (8)	2–5	Stade Auxerrois (7)
36.	FC Champs-sur-Yonne (10)	4–1	US Joigny (10)
37.	FC Chevannes (9)	2–2 (5–4 p)	AS Clamecy (7)
38.	AS Pouilly-sur-Loire (10)	0–2	US Cerisiers (7)
39.	Val de Norge FC (10)	0–2	EFC Demigny (11)
40.	Union Châtillonniase Colombine (9)	0–8	Chevigny St Sauveur (7)
41.	FC Autun (9)	1–4	Fontaine-lès-Dijon FC (7)
42.	Spartak Bressey (11)	0–3	EF Villages (10)
43.	FC St Rémy-le Montbard (10)	3–0	ASC Manlay (10)
44.	US Meursault (8)	0–1	US Cheminots Dijonnais (7)
45.	AS Gevrey-Chambertin (10)	0–2	Montbard Venarey (8)
46.	AS Pouilly-en-Auxois (9)	1–2	ASC Plombières-Lès-Dijon (8)
47.	FC Corgoloin-Ladoix (9)	2–1	UF Tonnerrois (10)
48.	FC Plaine 39 (10)	1–2	AS St Usage St Jean-de-Losne (8)
49.	AS Garchizy (7)	4–3	Sud Foot 71 (8)
50.	AS Valentigney (11)	1–4	AS Mélisey-St Barthélemy (8)
51.	RC Voujeaucourt (10)	4–2	AS Orchamps-Vennes (8)
52.	ES Lièvremont (10)	6–3	AS Mont D'Usiers (10)
53.	Travailleurs Turcs Pontarlier (9)	2–1	AS Levier (7)
54.	AS Morbier (8)	2–3	US Crotenay Combe d'Ain (9)
55.	FC Haut Jura (9)	0–3	ES Doubs (8)
56.	FCC La Joux (8)	0–1	FC Champagnole (7)
57.	AS Château de Joux (9)	7–0	ES Sirod (10)
58.	ES Les Sapins (10)	1–3	FC Montfaucon-Morre-Gennes-La Vèze (7)
59.	ES Montenois (11)	0–1	FC L'Isle-sur-le-Doubs (8)
60.	US Châtenois-les-Forges (7)	5–5 (3–5 p)	US Sochaux (7)
61.	ASL Autechaux-Roide (10)	3–3 (11–10 p)	ASFC Belfort (8)
62.	Longevelle SC (10)	1–2 (a.e.t.)	SR Delle (10)
63.	FC Le Russey (11)	2–4 (a.e.t.)	AS Bavilliers (8)
64.	SC Lure (10)	12–1	US St Hippolyte (11)
65.	US Les Fins (11)	1–2	AS Belfort Sud (7)
66.	FC Breuches (10)	2–5	US Sous-Roches (8)
67.	FC Bart (8)	2–5 (a.e.t.)	AS Audincourt (7)
68.	AS Méziré-Fesches-le-Châtel (9)	2–7	AS Nord Territoire (9)
69.	FC Villars-sous-Écot (8)	2–1 (a.e.t.)	ES Exincourt-Taillecourt (9)
70.	CS Portusien (9)	1–0	US Larians-et-Munans (7)
71.	AS Moissey (11)	0–3	FC Grand Besançon (9)
72.	AS Foucherans (9)	0–8	ES Fauverney-Rouvres-Bretenière (7)
73.	FC Mirebellois-Pontailler-Lamarche (8)	0–10	CS Auxonnais (7)
74.	US Rigny (10)	0–4	US Scey-sur-Saône (8)
75.	US Brazey (11)	0–6	FC Noidanais (7)
76.	FC Vingeanne (11)	0–1	Espérance Arc-Gray (8)
77.	SC Jussey (10)	0–1	ALC Longvic (6)
78.	Étoile Sud Nivernaise 58 (9)	2–4	FC Nevers 58 (8)
79.	FC Nevers Banlay (10)	0–0 (4–2 p)	US Rigny-sur-Arroux (9)
80.	FC Abergement-de-Cuisery (9)	4–1	IS St Usuge (10)
81.	FC Brenne-Orain (10)	0–0 (3–1 p)	AS Sagy (8)
82.	IS Bresse Nord (10)	1–2	Olympique Montmorot (8)
83.	FC Aiglepierre (9)	1–0	Triangle d'Or Jura Foot (8)
84.	AS Perrouse (9)	4–1	AS Sâone-Mamirolle (8)
85.	FC Rochefort-Amange (9)	1–2	US Rioz-Étuz-Cussey (7)
86.	Poligny-Grimont FC (7)	2–3	CCS Val d'Amour Mont-sous-Vaudrey (8)
87.	FC Val de Loue (9)	2–3	AEP Pouilley-les-Vignes (8)
88.	FC Gevry (11)	1–4	Bresse Jura Foot (7)
89.	US Lessard-en-Bresse (9)	0–1	US San-Martinoise (10)
90.	AFC Cuiseaux-Champagnat (10)	3–0	US Revermontaise (11)
91.	US Luzy-Millay (9)	0–3	US Varenne-St Yan (10)

== Third round ==
These matches were played on 15 and 16 September 2018. Included in the draw is AS Saint Pierraise from the Overseas Collectivity of Saint Pierre and Miquelon.

Third round results: Bourgogne-Franche-Comté
Tie no	Home team (tier)	Score	Away team (tier)
1.	ALC Longvic (7)	2–1	(Saint Pierre and Miquelon) AS Saint Pierraise
2.	FC Giro-Lepuix (8)	0–4	Racing Besançon (5)
3.	JS Montchanin ODRA (7)	0–3	FC Gueugnon (5)
4.	FR Saint Marcel (7)	4–5 (a.e.t.)	UF Mâconnais (6)
5.	ES Doubs (8)	4–1	US Coteaux de Seille (7)
6.	Amancey-Bolandoz-Chantrans Foot (11)	0–3	US Rioz-Étuz-Cussey (7)
7.	AS Baume-les-Dames (6)	2–1	FC Vesoul (6)
8.	Union Cosnoise Sportive (7)	5–1 (a.e.t.)	AS Chablis (8)
9.	SC Lure (10)	0–2	JS Lure (8)
10.	US Sous-Roches (8)	2–0	AS Mélisey-St Barthélemy (8)
11.	FC Valdahon-Vercel (6)	1–1 (1–3 p)	AS Belfort Sud (7)
12.	ASL Autechaux-Roide (10)	1–3	US Sochaux (7)
13.	FC Villars-sous-Écot (8)	0–4	US Pont-de-Roide (6)
14.	RC Voujeaucourt (10)	2–6	AS Bavilliers (8)
15.	AS Danjoutin-Andelnans-Méroux (7)	1–4	AS Audincourt (7)
16.	AS St Usage St Jean-de-Losne (8)	4–0	ASFC Daix (9)
17.	FC St Rémy-le Montbard (10)	1–5	ASPTT Dijon (6)
18.	CS Auxonnais (7)	3–2	Montbard Venarey (8)
19.	AS Quetigny (6)	1–0	Jura Dolois Foot (5)
20.	SR Delle (10)	3–5	FC Grandvillars (5)
21.	AS Nord Territoire (9)	2–1	FC L'Isle-sur-le-Doubs (8)
22.	AEP Pouilley-les-Vignes (8)	4–2	FC Aiglepierre (9)
23.	Travailleurs Turcs Pontarlier (9)	0–1	AS Ornans (6)
24.	US Saint-Vit (6)	1–1 (3–4 p)	Bresse Jura Foot (7)
25.	Olympique Montmorot (8)	1–4	FC Morteau-Montlebon (5)
26.	AS Perrouse (9)	0–3	FC Champagnole (7)
27.	FC Montfaucon-Morre-Gennes-La Vèze (7)	0–3	RC Lons-le-Saunier (6)
28.	FC Grand Besançon (9)	3–6 (a.e.t.)	CCS Val d'Amour Mont-sous-Vaudrey (8)
29.	US Crotenay Combe d'Ain (9)	1–2	Entente Sud-Revermont (7)
30.	ES Lièvremont (10)	0–8	Besançon Football (5)
31.	US San-Martinoise (10)	0–4	AS Château de Joux (9)
32.	FC Brenne-Orain (10)	0–4	FC 4 Rivières 70 (6)
33.	AFC Cuiseaux-Champagnat (10)	2–5	Entente Roche-Novillars (6)
34.	FC Noidanais (7)	2–1	Espérance Arc-Gray (8)
35.	ASC Plombières-Lès-Dijon (8)	0–6	Louhans-Cuiseaux FC (5)
36.	CS Portusien (9)	0–4	FC Chalon (6)
37.	FC Sennecé-lès-Mâcon (10)	0–1	US St Sernin-du-Bois (7)
38.	ASC Pougues (9)	1–0	CSP Charmoy (9)
39.	ASA Vauzelles (8)	0–3	Sud Nivernais Imphy Decize (6)
40.	FC Nevers Banlay (10)	0–3	FC Nevers 58 (8)
41.	AS Garchizy (7)	0–5	CO Avallon (5)
42.	FC Chevannes (9)	0–3	Paron FC (6)
43.	AS Guerigny Urzy Chaulgnes (9)	0–3	Stade Auxerrois (7)
44.	RC Nevers-Challuy Sermoise (7)	3–0	Avallon Vauban FC (8)
45.	ES Appoigny (9)	1–0 (a.e.t.)	AS St Benin (7)
46.	FC Fleury-la-Vallée (11)	0–5	FC Sens (6)
47.	FC Champs-sur-Yonne (10)	2–5	US La Charité (5)
48.	US Buxynoise (10)	0–7	CS Sanvignes (7)
49.	Digoin FCA (8)	3–5	ASL Lux (9)
50.	FC Corgoloin-Ladoix (9)	0–0 (5–6 p)	ES Fauverney-Rouvres-Bretenière (7)
51.	US Cheminots Dijonnais (7)	0–1	AS Beaune (7)
52.	Fontaine-lès-Dijon FC (7)	2–4	ASC Saint-Apollinaire (6)
53.	Chevigny St Sauveur (7)	1–4	Is-Selongey Football (5)
54.	EF Villages (10)	1–0	US Scey-sur-Saône (8)
55.	US Sennecey-le-Grand et Son Canton (8)	0–1	AS Châtenoy-le-Royal (7)
56.	US Varenne-St Yan (10)	0–2	US Cheminots Paray (6)
57.	FC Abergement-de-Cuisery (9)	0–1	AS Cheminots Chagnotins (10)
58.	EFC Demigny (11)	0–3	AS St Vincent-Bragny (9)
59.	SR Clayettois (9)	5–5 (5–6 p)	AS Chapelloise (6)
60.	ESA Breuil (8)	0–1	FC Montceau Bourgogne (5)
61.	St Fargeau SF (10)	5–6 (a.e.t.)	US Cerisiers (7)

== Fourth round ==
These matches were played on 29 and 30 September 2018.

Fourth round results: Bourgogne-Franche-Comté
Tie no	Home team (tier)	Score	Away team (tier)
1.	Bresse Jura Foot (7)	1–1 (2–4 p)	ASPTT Dijon (6)
2.	AS Châtenoy-le-Royal (7)	0–2	Jura Sud Foot (4)
3.	ES Fauverney-Rouvres-Bretenière (7)	0–0 (3–2 p)	CS Auxonnais (7)
4.	AS Chapelloise (6)	2–1	Is-Selongey Football (5)
5.	US Rioz-Étuz-Cussey (7)	1–1 (5–4 p)	AS Quetigny (6)
6.	ALC Longvic (7)	0–11	FC Montceau Bourgogne (5)
7.	EF Villages (10)	0–2	ASC Saint-Apollinaire (6)
8.	ASL Lux (9)	2–5	UF Mâconnais (6)
9.	CCS Val d'Amour Mont-sous-Vaudrey (8)	2–3	AS St Usage St Jean-de-Losne (8)
10.	AS Beaune (7)	5–1	FC Champagnole (7)
11.	RC Lons-le-Saunier (6)	2–4 (a.e.t.)	Racing Besançon (5)
12.	CS Sanvignes (7)	1–0	Stade Auxerrois (7)
13.	AS Cheminots Chagnotins (10)	0–3	FC Gueugnon (5)
14.	US Cerisiers (7)	0–3	CO Avallon (5)
15.	Union Cosnoise Sportive (7)	2–1	RC Nevers-Challuy Sermoise (7)
16.	FC Nevers 58 (8)	0–3	FC Chalon (6)
17.	ASC Pougues (9)	0–1	US Cheminots Paray (6)
18.	AS St Vincent-Bragny (9)	1–2	US La Charité (5)
19.	FC Sens (6)	1–3	ASM Belfort (4)
20.	Sud Nivernais Imphy Decize (6)	3–2	Paron FC (6)
21.	ES Appoigny (9)	1–1 (3–1 p)	US St Sernin-du-Bois (7)
22.	AS Nord Territoire (9)	0–1	AS Baume-les-Dames (6)
23.	US Sochaux (7)	1–2	FC Grandvillars (5)
24.	AS Belfort Sud (7)	1–3	AEP Pouilley-les-Vignes (8)
25.	Louhans-Cuiseaux FC (5)	2–1	CA Pontarlier (4)
26.	JS Lure (8)	2–1	AS Château de Joux (9)
27.	FC Noidanais (7)	0–1	FC Morteau-Montlebon (5)
28.	AS Audincourt (7)	2–5	US Pont-de-Roide (6)
29.	ES Doubs (8)	1–2	Entente Roche-Novillars (6)
30.	AS Ornans (6)	0–3	Besançon Football (5)
31.	AS Bavilliers (8)	1–2	US Sous-Roches (8)
32.	Entente Sud-Revermont (7)	1–2 (a.e.t.)	FC 4 Rivières 70 (6)

== Fifth round ==
These matches were played on 13 and 14 October 2018.

Fifth round results: Bourgogne-Franche-Comté
Tie no	Home team (tier)	Score	Away team (tier)
1.	FC Gueugnon (5)	2–0	Jura Sud Foot (4)
2.	ASPTT Dijon (6)	3–2 (a.e.t.)	AS Chapelloise (6)
3.	Sud Nivernais Imphy Decize (6)	2–1	CS Sanvignes (7)
4.	FC Chalon (6)	0–1	AS Beaune (7)
5.	ES Appoigny (9)	1–4	CO Avallon (5)
6.	AS St Usage St Jean-de-Losne (8)	0–0 (3–4 p)	US Cheminots Paray (6)
7.	Union Cosnoise Sportive (7)	0–1	US La Charité (5)
8.	Besançon Football (5)	5–0	UF Mâconnais (6)
9.	US Sous-Roches (8)	0–2	FC Morteau-Montlebon (5)
10.	Entente Roche-Novillars (6)	2–0	FC 4 Rivières 70 (6)
11.	AEP Pouilley-les-Vignes (8)	3–2	AS Baume-les-Dames (6)
12.	JS Lure (8)	0–3	ASC Saint-Apollinaire (6)
13.	US Rioz-Étuz-Cussey (7)	2–3	Louhans-Cuiseaux FC (5)
14.	ES Fauverney-Rouvres-Bretenière (7)	0–4	FC Montceau Bourgogne (5)
15.	FC Grandvillars (5)	0–2	ASM Belfort (4)
16.	US Pont-de-Roide (6)	1–0	Racing Besançon (5)

== Sixth round ==
These matches were played on 27 and 28 October 2018.

Sixth round results: Bourgogne-Franche-Comté
Tie no	Home team (tier)	Score	Away team (tier)
1.	ASM Belfort (4)	1–2	FC Montceau Bourgogne (5)
2.	AEP Pouilley-les-Vignes (8)	0–5	FC Morteau-Montlebon (5)
3.	CO Avallon (5)	0–3 (a.e.t.)	Louhans-Cuiseaux FC (5)
4.	AS Beaune (7)	5–1	US Pont-de-Roide (6)
5.	US Cheminots Paray (6)	2–0	Entente Roche-Novillars (6)
6.	US La Charité (5)	2–0	Sud Nivernais Imphy Decize (6)
7.	ASPTT Dijon (6)	0–3	Besançon Football (5)
8.	ASC Saint-Apollinaire (6)	1–2	FC Gueugnon (5)
