= 2023–24 Coupe de France preliminary rounds, Bourgogne-Franche-Comté =

The 2023–24 Coupe de France preliminary rounds, Bourgogne-Franche-Comté is the qualifying competition to decide which teams from the leagues of the Bourgogne-Franche-Comté region of France take part in the main competition from the seventh round.

A total of nine teams will qualify from the Bourgogne-Franche-Comté section of the 2023–24 Coupe de France preliminary rounds.

In 2022–23, ASM Belfort progressed the furthest in the competition, reaching the round of 32, where they were beaten by Annecy FC on penalties, in a game which ended with fighting between the players of both sides.

== Draws and fixtures ==
On 13 June 2023, the league announced that 404 teams had entered from the region. The draw for the first round was published on the same day, featuring 298 teams from the district level divisions, and from Régional 3. The remaining 24 Régional 3 teams were given a bye to the second round. The draw for the second round was published on 22 August 2023, featuring the remaining 89 Régional level teams.

The third round draw, featuring the 11 teams from Championnat National 3, was published on 29 August 2023. The fourth round draw, featuring the 3 teams from Championnat National 2, was carried out on 19 September 2023. The fifth round draw, featuring the 2 teams from Championnat National, was published on 3 October 2023. The sixth and final regional round was drawn on 18 October 2023.

=== First round ===
These matches were played on 19 and 20 August 2023.

First Round Results: Bourgogne-Franche-Comté
Tie no	Home team (Tier)	Score	Away team (Tier)
1.	FC Alligny-Saint-Amand (11)	3–3 (2–4 p)	AS Varzy (10)
2.	AS Cossaye (10)	0–7	UF La Machine (8)
3.	US Saint-Pierre Foot 58 (9)	2–3	JS Marzy (9)
4.	Chaulgnes FC (10)	1–4	ASC Pougues (9)
5.	JS Tannay (12)	0–9	AS Clamecy (9)
6.	CIE Imphy (10)	5–1	US Cercycoise (10)
7.	AS Fourchambault (8)	2–2 (5–3 p)	US Moulinoise (9)
8.	AS Pouilly-sur-Loire (10)	2–0	FC Château-Chinon-Arleuf (9)
9.	CS Corbigeois (9)	5–2	AS Guerigny Urzy (9)
10.	AS Charrin (9)	1–1 (3–1 p)	US Coulanges-lès-Nevers (8)
11.	UF Villeneuvienne (11)	1–5	Entente Saint-Florentin FC (9)
12.	FC Champs-sur-Yonne (9)	2–1	US Joigny (8)
13.	ESIV Saint-Sérotin (11)	3–3 (4–1 p)	AS Chablis (9)
14.	FC Chevannes (10)	1–7	US Cerisiers (8)
15.	AS Gurgy (9)	3–1	SC Malay-le-Grand (10)
16.	AS Montoise (9)	3–0 (Note: Tie won by means of forfeit.)	FC Fleury-la-Vallée (10)
17.	US Dionysienne (10)	11–1	Aillant SF (10)
18.	Saint-Fargeau SF (10)	2–6	SC Gron Véron (10)
19.	ES Vinneuf Courlon (10)	3–3 ((3–1 p) p)	FC Remilly (11)
76.	FC Jeunesse Mahoraise (11)	2–2 (4–5 p)	US Nolay (11)
77.	FC Saulon-Corcelles (10)	0–1	Tilles FC (9)
78.	AS Canton du Bligny-sur-Ouche (11)	2–2 (5–6 p)	US Brazey (11)
79.	Dijon ULFE (10)	2–2 (7–6 p)	Football Champdotre Longeault Association (10)
80.	Nouvelle Étoile Colombine (11)	0–1	AS Pouilly-en-Auxois (9)
81.	CSL Chenôve (11)	4–4 (3–4 p)	ASC Plombières-Lès-Dijon (11)
82.	Spartak Bressey (11)	0–1	CF Talant (10)
83.	Olympique Chaignay (11)	1–1 (4–5 p)	FC Mirebellois-Pontailler-Lamarche (9)
84.	FC Saint-Lupicin (10)	1–0	US Trois Monts (9)
85.	FC Macornay Val de Sorne (9)	4–1	FR Archelange-Gredisans-Menotey (10)
86.	Grandvaux Foot (10)	3–0	AS Foucherans (10)
87.	FC Plaine 39 (10)	0–8	FC Rochefort Athletic (8)
88.	AS Montbarrey (11)	0–2	Arcade Foot (8)
89.	AS Aromas (11)	6–3	Jura Nord Foot (9)
90.	FC Aiglepierre (10)	4–0	FC Molay (10)
91.	FR Rahon (11)	1–9	FC Haut Jura (9)
92.	RCF Saint-Claude (11)	0–0 (5–3 p)	FC Petite Montagne (10)
93.	AS Saint-Aubin (11)	1–1 (3–0 p)	US Crotenay Combe d'Ain (9)
94.	GC Beaufort (11)	3–2	ES Sirod (10)
95.	ISS Pleure (10)	5–1	AS Moissey (11)
96.	FC Brenne-Orain (10)	3–4	Entente Sud Revermont (9)
97.	US Perrigny Conliège (12)	0–2	PS Dole-Crissey (10)
98.	FC Mouchard-Arc-et-Senans (10)	6–1	FC Mont Noir (10)
99.	FC Arlay (11)	0–2	Jura Stad' FC (9)
100.	FC Courlaoux (11)	3–4	AS Vaux-lès-Saint-Claude (10)
101.	Dampierre Foot (10)	4–2	AS Essert (10)
102.	FC Premier Plateau (10)	0–1	Olympique Courcelles-lès-Montbéliard (11)
103.	US Roches-lès-Blamont (10)	1–1 (5–4 p)	US Saint Hippolyte (10)
104.	ES Bretonvillers Charmoille (11)	1–1 (6–7 p)	US Abbévillers-Vandoncourt (11)
105.	Rougemont Concorde (10)	0–3	ES Doubs (9)
106.	ES Les Fonges 91 (10)	1–1 (6–7 p)	AS Nord Territoire (8)
107.	Arche FC (11)	2–5	US Sochaux (8)
108.	AS Courtefontaine-Les Plains (10)	2–3	FC Villars-sous-Écot/Saint-Maurice/Blussans (9)
109.	FC 3 Cantons (9)	3–1	AS Etalans Vernierfontaine (10)
110.	FC Orchamps OP (11)	4–1	US Arcey (10)
111.	AS Pierrefontaine et Laviron (10)	0–2	RC Voujeaucourt (10)
112.	FC Plaimbois-du-Miroir (10)	3–1	SR Delle (9)
113.	ES Saugette Entre-Roches (9)	2–0	AS Orchamps-Val de Vennes (8)
114.	AS Dambelin (11)	0–7	ASC Montrapon Besançon (11)
115.	AS Beure (12)	2–2 (2–4 p)	AS Mont d'Usiers (10)
116.	FC Clerval Anteuil (10)	5–1	FC Bourogne (11)
117.	US Les Fins (9)	2–1	Amancey-Bolandoz-Chantrans Foot (10)
118.	AS Avoudrey (10)	3–2	Drugeon Sports (10)
119.	Esperance Auxons-Miserey (10)	5–0	AS Feule-Solemont (11)
120.	FC Suarce (10)	5–0	FC Liévremont-Arçon (9)
121.	FC Grand Besançon (10)	7–0	FC Seloncourt (10)
122.	FC Massif Haut Doubs (11)	0–4	ES Exincourt-Taillecourt (8)
123.	AS Noël-Cerneux-Chenalotte (10)	0–2	SC Villers-le-Lac (9)
124.	ASC Velotte (9)	9–1	FC Lac-Remoray-Vaux (10)
125.	AS Hérimoncourt (10)	4–0	US Laveron (11)
126.	SC Besançon (11)	5–1	ES Dannemarie (11)
127.	Thise-Chalezeule FC (10)	2–2 (3–4 p)	FC Giro-Lepuix (9)
128.	SCM Valdoie (9)	2–1	AS Guyans-Vennes (10)
129.	FC Le Russey (10)	2–0	AS Rougegoutte (11)
130.	SR Villars-sous-Dampjoux (11)	0–1	US Les Écorces (8)
131.	AS Plateau de La Barêche (10)	4–6	UOP Mathay (10)
132.	US Les Quatre Monts (11)	0–3	Bessoncourt Roppe Club Larivière (8)
133.	US Les Fontenelles (11)	1–4	Entente Le Châteleu (10)
134.	FC Émagny Pin (11)	1–5	US Sous-Roches (10)
135.	SC Clémenceau Besançon (10)	6–3	ES Les Sapins (10)
136.	US Avanne-Aveney (11)	1–4	ASC Besançon Mahoraise (9)
137.	AS Haut Lison (11)	6–5 (Note: AS Haut Lison penalised after it was discovered one of their players was playing under a different identity. US Doubs Sud qualify.)	US Doubs Sud (10)
138.	ASL Autechaux-Roide (10)	1–1 (4–3 p)	AS Montandon (11)
139.	AO Vesoul (9)	6–1	FC Les 2 Vels (10)
140.	Espérance Arc-Gray (9)	2–0	AS Traves (10)
141.	FC La Gourgeonne (10)	1–6	FEP Autrey-lès-Gray (9)
142.	AS Fougerolles (10)	1–3	SG Héricourt (8)
143.	SC Lure (11)	3–4	FC Seveux-Motey (12)
144.	FC Monts de Gy (10)	1–3	AS Magny-Vernois (10)
145.	Haute-Lizaine Pays d'Héricourt (8)	0–0 (2–4 p)	FC Pays Minier (8)
146.	ES Marnaysienne (9)	8–2	US Frotey-lès-Vesoul (10)
147.	US Franchevelle (10)	2–1	Vallée du Breuchin FC (10)
148.	FC Pays de Luxeuil (9)	3–2	FC Colombe (9)
149.	Vesoul RC (10)	0–7	SC Saint Loup-Corbenay-Magnoncourt (8)

=== Second round ===
These matches were played on 26 and 27 August 2023, with one postponed to 10 September 2023.

Second Round Results: Bourgogne-Franche-Comté
Tie no	Home team (Tier)	Score	Away team (Tier)
1.	AS Saint-Agnan (10)	4–2	AS Igornay (11)
2.	CS Orion (11)	0–3	Digoin FCA (9)
3.	CS Sanvignes (7)	2–1	AS Saint-Benin (7)
4.	ASJ Torcy (10)	5–1	CS Corbigeois (9)
5.	Dun Sornin Chauffailles Brionnais (9)	1–2	UF La Machine (8)
6.	FC Uxeau (11)	0–7	AS Fourchambault (8)
7.	FC Nevers 58 (7)	2–1	US Saint-Sernin-du-Bois (6)
8.	Entente Antully-Saint-Emiland-Auxy (11)	0–7	Team Montceau Foot (8)
9.	AS Saint-Vincent-Bragny (9)	6–1	Gachères FC (10)
10.	AS Ciry-le-Noble (10)	1–2	AS Charrin (9)
11.	AS Varzy (10)	0–1	Sud Foot 71 (8)
12.	US Rigny-sur-Arroux (9)	3–0	SC Etangois (10)
13.	FC Vitry-en-Charollais (10)	0–5	US Cheminots Paray (7)
14.	FC Nevers Banlay (7)	1–1 (4–1 p)	Sud Nivernais Imphy Decize (7)
15.	AS Magny (7)	2–3	ASA Vauzelles (7)
16.	ASC Pougues (9)	0–7	US La Charité (7)
17.	JS Marzy (9)	0–3	US Bourbon-Lancy FPT (9)
18.	AS Pouilly-sur-Loire (10)	0–1	CIE Imphy (10)
19.	Étoile Sud Nivernaise 58 (8)	2–3	RC Nevers-Challuy Sermoise (7)
20.	AS Clamecy (9)	1–4	AS Garchizy (6)
21.	CS Auxonnais (10)	0–3 (Note: Tie won by means of forfeit.)	ES Appoigny (8)
22.	Amicale Franco-Portugais Sens (8)	0–3	CA Saint-Georges (8)
23.	Montbard Venarey (9)	2–0	Paron FC (7)
24.	AS Pouilly-en-Auxois (9)	1–2	AS Montoise (9)
25.	ACB Soucy-Thorigny (11)	0–5	US Semur-Époisses (9)
26.	UF Tonnerrois (9)	1–6	FC Sens (6)
27.	Entente Saint-Florentin FC (9)	8–3	US Dionysienne (10)
28.	ES Vinneuf Courlon (10)	0–4	ASUC Migennes (7)
29.	ESIV Saint-Sérotin (11)	2–1	FC Champs-sur-Yonne (9)
30.	Union Châtillonniase Colombine (8)	6–1	Entente Châtel-Gérard Nucerien (9)
31.	US Cerisiers (8)	1–3	AS Gurgy (9)
32.	SC Gron Véron (10)	0–4	AS Quetigny (6)
33.	FC Saint-Rémy-les-Montbard (8)	1–1 (3–4 p)	Avallon FCO (7)
34.	US Toucycoise (8)	2–2 (3–4 p)	Stade Auxerrois (6)
35.	AS Cheminots Chagnotins (9)	0–1	AS Châtenoy-le-Royal (9)
36.	ÉFC Demigny (10)	1–3	AS Beaune (6)
37.	EF Villages (7)	3–0	ESA Breuil (8)
38.	AS Longchamp (12)	0–4	JS Montchanin ODRA (8)
39.	Val de Norge FC (9)	0–1	US Blanzy (9)
40.	Afrique Foot Dijonnais (11)	0–8	Fontaine-lès-Dijon FC (6)
41.	CL Marsannay-la-Côte (7)	1–1 (5–3 p)	ALC Longvic (7)
42.	Chalon ACF (8)	2–2 (3–4 p)	FC Chalon (6)
43.	AS Mellecey-Mercurey (10)	3–1	ASL Lux (9)
44.	US Rully Fontaines (9)	1–0	US Cheminots Dijonnais (6)
45.	Joncy Salornay Val de Guye (10)	4–1	Dijon ULFE (10)
46.	FC Saint-Rémy (9)	0–1	AS Gevrey-Chambertin (8)
47.	US Nolay (11)	0–3	ASC Plombières-Lès-Dijon (11)
48.	CF Talant (10)	5–0	Dinamo Dijon (11)
49.	ASI Vougeot (11)	4–1	US Meursault (8)
50.	FC Montceau Bourgogne (6)	2–1	JO Le Creusot (7)
51.	AS Fontaine d'Ouche (11)	1–6 (Note: Tie reversed from original draw.)	ASFC Daix (10)
52.	AS Tournus (11)	0–5	Entente Sud Revermont (9)
53.	Mâcon FC (8)	2–0	Olympique Montmorot (8)
54.	ES Montponnaise (11)	3–4	AS Sagy (8)
55.	US Lessard-en-Bresse (9)	0–1	Bresse Jura Foot (6)
56.	Triangle d'Or Jura Foot (8)	2–3	FC Clessé (9)
57.	RC Bresse Sud (8)	1–1 (2–4 p)	CS Mervans (8)
58.	ES Branges (10)	0–3	US Sennecey-le-Grand et son Canton (8)
59.	JS Simard (11)	0–3	US Cluny (8)
60.	AS Varennes-le-Grand (10)	0–1	Arcade Foot (8)
61.	AS Sornay (7)	1–0	Poligny-Grimont FC (7)
62.	FR Saint Marcel (7)	2–2 (5–3 p)	FC Sennecé-lès-Mâcon (8)
63.	GC Beaufort (11)	1–4	JS Crechoise (9)
64.	US Coteaux de Seille (8)	3–1	RC Lons-le-Saunier (6)
65.	FC Aiglepierre (10)	2–1	AS Aromas (11)
66.	ISS Pleure (10)	1–1 (7–8 p)	AF Audeux/Pelousey/Pouilley-les-Vignes (8)
67.	Esperance Auxons-Miserey (10)	0–1	RC Saônois (8)
68.	AS Saint Usage Saint-Jean-de-Losne (7)	1–0	FC 4 Rivières 70 (6)
69.	SC Clémenceau Besançon (10)	0–4	ES Marnaysienne (9)
70.	FC Mirebellois-Pontailler-Lamarche (9)	1–2	US Saint-Vit (6)
71.	US Brazey (11)	2–6	FC Seveux-Motey (12)
72.	AS Saint-Aubin (11)	1–2	Espérance Arc-Gray (9)
73.	PS Dole-Crissey (10)	0–7	ASC Saint-Apollinaire (6)
74.	FC Orchamps OP (11)	1–1 (1–4 p)	AS Perrouse (6)
75.	ASC Velotte (9)	2–3	Chevigny Saint-Sauveur (7)
76.	FEP Autrey-lès-Gray (9)	0–2	FC Rochefort Athletic (8)
77.	ASC Montrapon Besançon (11)	3–5	Tilles FC (9)
78.	Jura Stad' FC (9)	2–3	AS Genlis (9)
79.	FC Neuilly-Crimolois Sennecey (10)	2–3	FC Grand Besançon (10)
80.	CLL Échenon (11)	0–5	ASC Besançon Mahoraise (9)
81.	ES Fauverney-Rouvres-Bretenière (6)	1–2	US Rioz-Étuz-Cussey (7)
82.	US Les Fins (9)	0–5	AS Ornans (6)
83.	ES Saugette Entre-Roches (9)	8–1	FC Val de Loue (8)
84.	CCS Val d'Amour Mont-sous-Vaudrey (6)	3–0	Entente Roche-Novillars (7)
85.	Entente Le Châteleu (10)	0–9	FCC La Joux (7)
86.	US Doubs Sud (10)	1–2	AS Château de Joux (7)
87.	RCF Saint-Claude (11)	2–3	AS Sâone-Mamirolle (8)
88.	FC Haut Jura (9)	3–3 (4–1 p)	FC Macornay Val de Sorne (9)
89.	CS Frasne (8)	2–3	FC Champagnole (6)
90.	ES Doubs (9)	0–1	AS Levier (7)
91.	SC Besançon (11)	1–2	Jura Lacs Foot (6)
92.	SC Villers-le-Lac (9)	4–1	AS Mont d'Usiers (10)
93.	AS Vaux-lès-Saint-Claude (10)	1–1 (2–4 p)	Grandvaux Foot (10)
94.	FC Saint-Lupicin (10)	1–1 (5–6 p)	FC Mouchard-Arc-et-Senans (10)
95.	FC Montfaucon-Morre-Gennes-La Vèze (7)	1–2	FC Morteau-Montlebon (6)
96.	AS Avoudrey (10)	1–5	AS Mélisey-Saint Barthélemy (7)
97.	US Sous-Roches (10)	3–4	AO Vesoul (9)
98.	SG Héricourt (8)	1–2	ES Pays Maîchois (7)
99.	FC Plaimbois-du-Miroir (10)	0–1	AS Audincourt (6)
100.	Bessoncourt Roppe Club Larivière (8)	1–3	ASFC Belfort (7)
101.	FC Villars-sous-Écot/Saint-Maurice/Blussans (9)	2–0	US Franchevelle (10)
102.	AS Danjoutin-Andelnans-Méroux (8)	0–3	US Pont-de-Roide (7)
103.	UOP Mathay (10)	1–1 (3–5 p)	FC Bart (7)
104.	FC Le Russey (10)	0–4	JS Lure (7)
105.	US Roches-lès-Blamont (10)	1–4	AS Méziré-Fesches-le-Châtel (8)
106.	AS Bavilliers (7)	3–2	US Larians-et-Munans (7)
107.	Olympique Courcelles-lès-Montbéliard (11)	0–2	AS Nord Territoire (8)
108.	AS Magny-Vernois (10)	0–6	FC Noidanais (6)
109.	FC Giro-Lepuix (9)	2–1	SCM Valdoie (9)
110.	SC Saint Loup-Corbenay-Magnoncourt (8)	0–1	AS Belfort Sud (6)
111.	AS Hérimoncourt (10)	1–3	US Châtenois-les-Forges (8)
112.	FC Suarce (10)	3–1	ASL Autechaux-Roide (10)
113.	FC Pays Minier (8)	1–3	FC Valdahon-Vercel (6)
114.	FC Pays de Luxeuil (9)	0–7	FC L'Isle-sur-le-Doubs (6)
115.	US Les Écorces (8)	1–3	FC Grandvillars (6)
116.	Dampierre Foot (10)	0–3	ES Exincourt-Taillecourt (8)
117.	FC Clerval Anteuil (10)	2–2 (5–4 p)	RC Voujeaucourt (10)
118.	US Abbévillers-Vandoncourt (11)	0–3	US Sochaux (8)
119.	FC 3 Cantons (9)	0–3	AS Baume-les-Dames (6)

=== Third round ===
These matches were played on 16 and 17 September 2023.

Third Round Results: Bourgogne-Franche-Comté
Tie no	Home team (Tier)	Score	Away team (Tier)
1.	FC Nevers Banlay (7)	2–3	ASPTT Dijon (5)
2.	CIE Imphy (10)	0–7	FC Montceau Bourgogne (6)
3.	CA Saint-Georges (8)	1–2	Avallon FCO (7)
4.	AS Charrin (9)	0–2	AS Beaune (6)
5.	US Semur-Époisses (9)	1–5	FC Sens (6)
6.	AS Fourchambault (8)	1–6	Union Cosnoise Sportive (5)
7.	UF La Machine (8)	2–0	Stade Auxerrois (6)
8.	AS Montoise (9)	0–5	ASA Vauzelles (7)
9.	AS Garchizy (6)	2–0	RC Nevers-Challuy Sermoise (7)
10.	ASC Saint-Apollinaire (6)	2–0	US La Charité (7)
11.	Team Montceau Foot (8)	6–2	Montbard Venarey (9)
12.	Union Châtillonniase Colombine (8)	2–3	Entente Saint-Florentin FC (9)
13.	ASUC Migennes (7)	4–1	FC Nevers 58 (7)
14.	ESIV Saint-Sérotin (11)	0–2	ES Appoigny (8)
15.	AS Gurgy (9)	2–4	FC Gueugnon (5)
16.	Sud Foot 71 (8)	1–4	Tilles FC (9)
17.	Bresse Jura Foot (6)	1–1 (2–3 p)	CCS Val d'Amour Mont-sous-Vaudrey (6)
18.	ASFC Daix (10)	0–9	Louhans-Cuiseaux FC (5)
19.	ASJ Torcy (10)	0–0 (2–4 p)	US Coteaux de Seille (8)
20.	CF Talant (10)	0–7	Is-Selongey Football (5)
21.	AS Saint-Vincent-Bragny (9)	1–1 (5–4 p)	AS Chapelloise (5)
22.	US Bourbon-Lancy FPT (9)	1–4	AS Quetigny (6)
23.	JS Montchanin ODRA (8)	1–3	FC Rochefort Athletic (8)
24.	ASI Vougeot (11)	0–5	EF Villages (7)
25.	US Rigny-sur-Arroux (9)	0–2	CS Sanvignes (7)
26.	US Blanzy (9)	7–0	AS Saint-Agnan (10)
27.	CL Marsannay-la-Côte (7)	1–5	FR Saint Marcel (7)
28.	Chevigny Saint-Sauveur (7)	1–4	Fontaine-lès-Dijon FC (6)
29.	AS Genlis (9)	3–0	Joncy Salornay Val de Guye (10)
30.	US Cheminots Paray (7)	0–1	FC Chalon (6)
31.	ASC Plombières-Lès-Dijon (11)	1–2	AS Gevrey-Chambertin (8)
32.	Digoin FCA (9)	2–0	AS Mellecey-Mercurey (10)
33.	Jura Lacs Foot (6)	0–5	CA Pontarlier (5)
34.	JS Crechoise (9)	2–0	US Rully Fontaines (9)
35.	FC Mouchard-Arc-et-Senans (10)	2–1	CS Mervans (8)
36.	US Rioz-Étuz-Cussey (7)	2–0	US Cluny (8)
37.	Arcade Foot (8)	1–1 (5–4 p)	FC Champagnole (6)
38.	FC Clessé (9)	2–2 (5–3 p)	AS Sornay (7)
39.	AS Châtenoy-le-Royal (9)	1–3	US Saint-Vit (6)
40.	AS Sâone-Mamirolle (8)	4–0	AS Saint Usage Saint-Jean-de-Losne (7)
41.	AS Levier (7)	4–0	AF Audeux/Pelousey/Pouilley-les-Vignes (8)
42.	FC Seveux-Motey (12)	1–1 (2–4 p)	FC Grand Besançon (10)
43.	Grandvaux Foot (10)	0–5	FCC La Joux (7)
44.	AS Sagy (8)	3–2	ASC Besançon Mahoraise (9)
45.	FC Haut Jura (9)	0–2	FC Valdahon-Vercel (6)
46.	Espérance Arc-Gray (9)	1–4	Mâcon FC (8)
47.	US Sennecey-le-Grand et son Canton (8)	2–5	Jura Dolois Football (5)
48.	ES Marnaysienne (9)	0–0 (6–7 p)	AS Ornans (6)
49.	FC Aiglepierre (10)	0–5	AS Château de Joux (7)
50.	Entente Sud Revermont (9)	2–1	AS Perrouse (6)
51.	FC Clerval Anteuil (10)	1–8	FC Bart (7)
52.	AS Nord Territoire (8)	6–2	ASFC Belfort (7)
53.	ES Saugette Entre-Roches (9)	0–4	ES Pays Maîchois (7)
54.	FC Suarce (10)	1–3	AS Bavilliers (7)
55.	FC Morteau-Montlebon (6)	2–1	ASM Belfort (5)
56.	US Châtenois-les-Forges (8)	0–4	FC Vesoul (5)
57.	FC Villars-sous-Écot/Saint-Maurice/Blussans (9)	0–4	AS Baume-les-Dames (6)
58.	ES Exincourt-Taillecourt (8)	0–0 (3–5 p)	FC Noidanais (6)
59.	US Sochaux (8)	1–2	AO Vesoul (9)
60.	SC Villers-le-Lac (9)	1–1 (10–11 p)	AS Belfort Sud (6)
61.	US Pont-de-Roide (7)	1–1 (3–5 p)	AS Mélisey-Saint Barthélemy (7)
62.	AS Méziré-Fesches-le-Châtel (8)	0–3	FC Grandvillars (6)
63.	RC Saônois (8)	1–1 (7–6 p)	FC L'Isle-sur-le-Doubs (6)
64.	FC Giro-Lepuix (9)	1–7	Besançon Football (5)
65.	JS Lure (7)	0–1	AS Audincourt (6)

=== Fourth round ===
These matches were played on 30 September and 1 October 2023.

Fourth Round Results: Bourgogne-Franche-Comté
Tie no	Home team (Tier)	Score	Away team (Tier)
1.	ES Appoigny (8)	0–2	AS Garchizy (6)
2.	Is-Selongey Football (5)	1–0	FC Montceau Bourgogne (6)
3.	CS Sanvignes (7)	0–3	FC Gueugnon (5)
4.	Entente Saint-Florentin FC (9)	4–0	Digoin FCA (9)
5.	US Blanzy (9)	0–1	Avallon FCO (7)
6.	ASA Vauzelles (7)	3–1	Fontaine-lès-Dijon FC (6)
7.	UF La Machine (8)	2–0	ASUC Migennes (7)
8.	FC Sens (6)	5–0	AS Quetigny (6)
9.	Team Montceau Foot (8)	0–2	Union Cosnoise Sportive (5)
10.	AS Saint-Vincent-Bragny (9)	0–8	UF Mâconnais (4)
11.	AS Beaune (6)	0–3	Jura Sud Foot (4)
12.	Mâcon FC (8)	3–1	FC Clessé (9)
13.	US Saint-Vit (6)	4–1	US Rioz-Étuz-Cussey (7)
14.	Entente Sud Revermont (9)	0–1	JS Crechoise (9)
15.	FR Saint Marcel (7)	2–2 (4–5 p)	Jura Dolois Football (5)
16.	Tilles FC (9)	4–4 (6–5 p)	FCC La Joux (7)
17.	AS Sagy (8)	1–1 (3–4 p)	AS Ornans (6)
18.	FC Mouchard-Arc-et-Senans (10)	0–1	FC Chalon (6)
19.	EF Villages (7)	0–0 (2–4 p)	ASPTT Dijon (5)
20.	Louhans-Cuiseaux FC (5)	6–0	CCS Val d'Amour Mont-sous-Vaudrey (6)
21.	US Coteaux de Seille (8)	3–1	Arcade Foot (8)
22.	AS Gevrey-Chambertin (8)	1–2	ASC Saint-Apollinaire (6)
23.	FC Grandvillars (6)	2–0	AS Baume-les-Dames (6)
24.	AS Levier (7)	2–3	CA Pontarlier (5)
25.	AS Bavilliers (7)	4–0	AS Nord Territoire (8)
26.	AS Mélisey-Saint Barthélemy (7)	3–1	FC Bart (7)
27.	RC Saônois (8)	0–0 (4–3 p)	AS Belfort Sud (6)
28.	AO Vesoul (9)	1–0	ES Pays Maîchois (7)
29.	AS Genlis (9)	0–8	Besançon Football (5)
30.	AS Château de Joux (7)	1–3	Racing Besançon (4)
31.	FC Rochefort Athletic (8)	4–1	FC Noidanais (6)
32.	FC Vesoul (5)	1–1 (6–5 p)	FC Valdahon-Vercel (6)
33.	AS Sâone-Mamirolle (8)	2–3	AS Audincourt (6)
34.	FC Grand Besançon (10)	1–1 (4–5 p)	FC Morteau-Montlebon (6)

=== Fifth round ===
These matches were played on 14 and 15 October 2023.

Fifth Round Results: Bourgogne-Franche-Comté
Tie no	Home team (Tier)	Score	Away team (Tier)
1.	Mâcon FC (8)	1–2	FC Rochefort Athletic (8)
2.	Entente Saint-Florentin FC (9)	1–5	Union Cosnoise Sportive (5)
3.	Avallon FCO (7)	0–5	Dijon FCO (3)
4.	FC Gueugnon (5)	1–3	Louhans-Cuiseaux FC (5)
5.	ASA Vauzelles (7)	1–2	UF Mâconnais (4)
6.	FC Chalon (6)	1–0	ASC Saint-Apollinaire (6)
7.	UF La Machine (8)	0–5	Jura Sud Foot (4)
8.	AS Garchizy (6)	2–2 (1–3 p)	FC Sens (6)
9.	JS Crechoise (9)	1–4	Is-Selongey Football (5)
10.	AS Mélisey-Saint Barthélemy (7)	0–4	FC Sochaux Montbéliard (3)
11.	AO Vesoul (9)	0–1	AS Bavilliers (7)
12.	FC Morteau-Montlebon (6)	2–1	Racing Besançon (4)
13.	AS Audincourt (6)	2–3	CA Pontarlier (5)
14.	US Coteaux de Seille (8)	1–0	Besançon Football (5)
15.	Jura Dolois Football (5)	4–0	US Saint-Vit (6)
16.	RC Saônois (8)	0–4	ASPTT Dijon (5)
17.	AS Ornans (6)	1–1 (3–4 p)	FC Grandvillars (6)
18.	Tilles FC (9)	0–5	FC Vesoul (5)

=== Sixth round ===
These matches were played on 28 and 29 October 2023.

Sixth Round Results: Bourgogne-Franche-Comté
Tie no	Home team (Tier)	Score	Away team (Tier)
1.	FC Rochefort Athletic (8)	0–6	UF Mâconnais (4)
2.	CA Pontarlier (5)	3–2	FC Morteau-Montlebon (6)
3.	FC Sens (6)	1–2	Dijon FCO (3)
4.	FC Sochaux Montbéliard (3)	1–0 (Note: Tie reversed from original draw.)	FC Grandvillars (6)
5.	Is-Selongey Football (5)	0–1	Jura Sud Foot (4)
6.	FC Vesoul (5)	0–1	Louhans-Cuiseaux FC (5)
7.	US Coteaux de Seille (8)	1–5	Union Cosnoise Sportive (5)
8.	AS Bavilliers (7)	1–2	ASPTT Dijon (5)
9.	FC Chalon (6)	1–1 (3–4 p)	Jura Dolois Football (5)
