= Golliard =

Golliard is a French surname. Notable people with the surname include:

- Ludovic Golliard (born 1983), French footballer
- Théo Golliard (born 2002), Swiss footballer
