= Gaston Diamé =

Mauritanian footballer

Personal information
- Date of birth: 16 November 1971 (age 54)
- Place of birth: Dakar, Senegal
- Position: Striker

Senior career*
Years	Team	Apps	(Gls)
1991–1996	Saint-Christophe Châteauroux		
1996–1997	SO Romorantin		
1997–1998	US Joué-lès-Tours	21	(2)
1998–2001	FC Bourges		
2001–2003	Reims	25	(7)
2003–2004	Angoulême CFC	16	(1)
2004–2005	AS Yzeure	16	(4)
2005–2007	Imphy Decize		

International career
2003	Mauritania	2	(0)

Managerial career
- 2010–2012: Imphy Decize
- 2013: Paris
- * Club domestic league appearances and goals

Gaston Diamé (born 16 November 1971) is a Mauritanian former international footballer who played as a striker.

== Career ==
Born in Dakar, Senegal, Diamé spent his entire club career in France, playing for Saint-Christophe Châteauroux, SO Romorantin, US Joué-lès-Tours, FC Bourges, Reims, Angoulême CFC, AS Yzeure and SNID.

He also earned two international caps for Mauritania in 2003, both of which came in FIFA World Cup qualifying games.
