= Lionel Charbonnier =

French footballer and manager (born 1966)

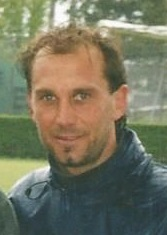
- Charbonnier in 2002

Personal information
- Full name: Lionel André Michel Charbonnier
- Date of birth: 25 October 1966 (age 59)
- Place of birth: Poitiers, Vienne, France
- Height: 1.81 m (5 ft 11 in)
- Position: Goalkeeper

Youth career
- 1986–1987: Auxerre

Senior career*
| Years | Team | Apps | (Gls) |
| 1987–1998 | Auxerre | 126 | (0) |
| 1998–2001 | Rangers | 18 | (0) |
| 2001–2002 | Lausanne Sports | 0 | (0) |
| Total | | 144 | (0) |

International career
| 1997 | France | 1 | (0) |

Managerial career
- 2002–2004: Stade Poitevin
- 2005–2007: Sens
- 2007–2009: Tahiti U20
- 2010–2011: Aceh United
- 2014–2015: Istres
- 2015: Sanga Balende
Medal record
Men's football
Representing France
FIFA World Cup
| Winner | 1998 |
Representing Tahiti (as manager)
OFC U-20 Championship
| Winner | 2008 Tahiti |
- * Club domestic league appearances and goals

Lionel André Michel Charbonnier (French pronunciation: [ljɔnɛl ɑ̃dʁe miʃɛl ʃaʁbɔnje]; born 25 October 1966) is a French football manager and former professional player who played as a goalkeeper. After retiring, he became a football manager and managed Aceh United of the Liga Primer Indonesia in the season before they folded along with their independent league.

Charbonnier played for the Auxerre side which won the Ligue 1 title and Coupe de France in the 1995–96 season under the management of Guy Roux. After eleven seasons with Auxerre, from 1987 to 1998, he joined Rangers in Scotland, where he won the treble of Scottish Premier League, Scottish Cup and Scottish League Cup in his first season, 1998–99. They retained the League and Cup in his second season. He retired in 2002, after a season with Lausanne Sports of the Swiss Super League.

Charbonnier was selected 32 times to the France national team but earned his only full cap in 1997. He was a member of the squad which won the 1998 FIFA World Cup on home soil, although he did not play a game.

He also managed Tahiti, a French overseas territory, at under-20 level, winning the Oceania Football Confederation's championship in that age bracket. Charbonnier qualified the Under-20 team to the 2009 World Cup in Egypt, the first time that any French island has qualified in this level of competition.

== Early life ==
Lionel André Michel Charbonnier was born on 25 October 1966 in Poitiers, Vienne.

== Club career ==
=== Auxerre ===
Charbonnier trained at Auxerre from the age of 16. He featured in their sides which won the Coupe Gambardella (a nationwide French competition for under-19 sides) twice in a row. In 1985, they beat Montpellier 3–0 and in 1986 Auxerre won on penalties after drawing 0–0 with Nantes. Charbonnier was often a second-choice goalkeeper in his early seasons at Auxerre, kept out by Bruno Martini who had played for the club since 1981. One of Charbonnier's most important matches in the first team was a semi-final in the 1992–93 UEFA Cup against Borussia Dortmund, which he lost on sudden-death penalties after both teams won their home leg 2–0.

Following a serious injury to Martini at the beginning of the 1993–94 season, Charbonnier became the first choice goalkeeper, winning that season's Coupe de France final. His form caused Martini to transfer to Montpellier in 1995 in order to play first-team football. In 1995–96, Auxerre won the Ligue 1 title and the Coupe de France.

=== Rangers ===
On 16 July 1998, only four days after the World Cup Final, he joined Rangers of the Scottish Premier League, signed by Dutch manager Dick Advocaat for £1.2 million. Charbonnier wore the number 1 shirt and initially competed with Antti Niemi for a place in the team. He suffered a cruciate ligament injury soon after but made 19 appearances throughout the season, including 11 in the league as Rangers won the 1998–99 Scottish Premier League title. Stefan Klos was signed in December 1998 and immediately became Rangers' first choice.

At the end of the 1998–99 season, Rangers completed the treble, also winning the Scottish Cup and Scottish League Cup. The following season, Klos retained his place as he had impressed in Charbonnier and Niemi's absence. Rangers won the league and Cup again, but were beaten in the quarter-final of the League Cup 1–0, away to Aberdeen. Charbonnier made eleven appearances in all competitions this season, though none after December 1999. In his final season at the club, he was fourth choice and did not play a single game in any competition. Klos played 47, Jesper Christiansen of Denmark played six, while Scottish player Mark Brown played in three games. Rangers won no trophies and finished second to Celtic in the league. Charbonnier's contract ended at the end of the season, and he left Ibrox.

=== Lausanne ===
When his Rangers contract ended, he joined Lausanne Sports of Switzerland's top flight (then called Nationalliga A). They finished eleventh out of 12 in the 2001–02 season, but were relegated alongside Sion (eighth) and Lugano (third) due to licensing regulations.

== International career ==
Charbonnier received one cap for France, against Italy on 11 June 1997 in the 1997 Tournoi de France, at the Parc des Princes stadium in Paris; the match finished in a 2–2 draw. He was one of the three goalkeepers of the France national team that won the 1998 World Cup on home soil. Fabien Barthez was the goalkeeper who kept Charbonnier out of the starting eleven.

== Managerial career ==
=== Poitiers and Sens ===
He became general manager of his hometown club Stade Poitevin in 2002 shortly after retiring. He parted with them in 2004. In 2005, he became the manager of another French lower-league club, Sens, until leaving in 2007 for international management.

=== Tahiti Under-20 ===
In 2007, he became national coach of the Tahiti national football team's under-20 and under-17 sections. Charbonnier led the under-20 team to victory in the Oceania Football Confederation's championship of that age bracket. In 2009, he led the Under-17 team to the final of the same competition, and also the Under-20 team to their first World Cup at any level, in Egypt. At the World Cup, Tahiti finished bottom of their group without scoring a goal and being beaten by Spain, Nigeria and Venezuela.

At the end of the year, Charbonnier was in conflict with Reynald Temarii, a Tahitian who is President of the Confederation. They agreed that Charbonnier would leave his post.

In 2010, he signed a consulting contract with Eurosport, and also got another managerial post, with Aceh United of the Liga Primer Indonesia.

== Honours ==
=== Player ===
Rangers

- Scottish Premier League: 1998–99

France

- FIFA World Cup: 1998

=== Manager ===
Tahiti U20

- OFC U-20 Championship: 2008

=== Orders ===
- Knight of the Legion of Honour: 1998
