= Ludovic Golliard =

French footballer (born 1983)

Personal information
- Date of birth: 13 March 1983 (age 43)
- Place of birth: Besançon, France
- Height: 1.82 m (6 ft 0 in)
- Position: Defender

Team information
- Current team: Besançon Football

Youth career
- Besançon RC
- AS St-Étienne

Senior career*
Years	Team	Apps	(Gls)
2001–2010	Besançon RC	192	(12)
2010–2011	US Creteil	37	(6)
2011–2014	RC Strasbourg	51	(2)
2014–2017	Besançon FC	60	(6)
2017–	Besançon Football	14	(0)
- * Club domestic league appearances and goals

Ludovic Golliard (born 13 March 1983) is a French professional footballer who currently plays for Besançon Football. He played at professional level in Ligue 2 for Besançon RC and US Creteil.
