= US Pont-de-Roide-Vermondans =

French football club

Point-de-Roide-Vermondans
- Short name: USPV
- Founded: 2003
- Stadium: Stade Municipal
- League: Régional 1 Bourgogne-Franche-Comté
- 2025–26: Régional 1 Bourgogne-Franche-Comté Group B, 2nd of 12

Union Sportive Pont-de-Roide-Vermondans is a French football club based in Pont-de-Roide-Vermondans, Franche-Comté. Founded in 2003, it competes in the Régional 1 as of the 2026–27 season.

== Awards ==
- Championship Division honor of Franche-Comté
  - Winner 1980, 1990 and 2006.
- Cup of Franche-Comté
  - Winner 1992, 1993 and 2002.
