= FC Nevers 58 =

French football club

Nevers
- Full name: Football Club Nevers 58
- Founded: 1948; 78 years ago
- Ground: Stade des Senets, Nevers
- Capacity: 1,500
- Chairman: Pierre Reparet
- Manager: André Bodji
- League: Ligue de Bourgogne de football
- 2010–11: DH Bourgogne, 6th
- Website: http://www.nevers-football.fr
Home colours

Football Club Nevers 58, also known simply as Nevers, is an association football club based in the town of Nevers, France. The club was founded in 1948 and their home stadium is the Stade des Senets, with a capacity of 1,500. As of the 2010–11 season, Nevers play in the Ligue de Bourgogne de football, the sixth tier of French football.

== History ==
Nevers Football knew its heyday in the 1970s. Notably, the club played twice in Ligue 2, during the 1973–74 season and then in the 1975–76 season. Nearly three decades later, under manager Daniel Bréard, Nevers won the Ligue de Bourgogne de football in 2009 and were promoted to the Championnat de France amateur 2, the fifth tier of French football, for the 2009–10 season. Despite a reinforced squad, Nevers was relegated back to the DH Bourgogne for the 2010–11 season.

== Notable players ==
- (Senegal) Ngore Sarr
- (France) Bruno Martini (youth)

== Honours ==
As of 7 August 2013.

=== Domestic ===
- Ligue de Bourgogne de football: 1
  - 2009
