= Sud Nivernais Imphy Decize =

French football club

- Founded: 2003 (fusion)
- Stadium: Stade des Halles
- Capacity: 1,200

Sud Nivernais Imphy Decize (SNID) is the name of a French football club from the south of the Nièvre. The manager, Jean-Philippe Panier is leading them in the CFA2.

The club was created in 2003 as a merger between Sporting Club Imphy (founded in 1925) and Association Sportive Decizoise (founded in 1932). The club has notably employed the services of Reynald Pedros, who previously played in Ligue 1, for clubs such as Nantes and Bastia. Other former professionals who played for the club in 2006/2007 include: Xavier Méride (ex-RC Lens and Toulouse FC) and Senegalese attacker Gaston Diamé (former Ligue 2 with Stade de Reims).

== Notable players ==
- (France) Reynald Pedros

== Honours ==
- Winners of the coupe de la Nièvre 2006, 2007
- Champion of DH Bourgogne 2004
