= FC Sens =

- Full name: Football Club de Sens
- Founded: 1987
- Ground: Stade Fernand Sastre, Sens
- Capacity: 2,614
- Chairman: Dominique Paquais
- Manager: Jean-Louis Granié
- League: Régional 1 Bourgogne-Franche-Comté
- 2025–26: Régional 1 Bourgogne-Franche-Comté Group A, 5th of 12

Football Club Sens is a French football club based in Sens, Yonne. The club currently plays in Régional 1, the sixth tier of the French football league system.

== History ==
It was founded in 1987 as a result of a merger between two teams, Stade de Sens and L'Alliance Sens. After starting at the regional level, in Division d'Honneur de Bourgogne, the club won its first title in 1992 and was promoted to the national level, Division 4 (then called National 3). The club won the league title in 1995 and was promoted to National 2 but went down again after just one season. Two years later, the club was relegated to DH Bourgogne where it spent five seasons before being promoted back to the CFA2 in 2003. After seven seasons of stability at this level, the club was relegated again, in 2011 to DH Bourgogne. After four seasons, FC Sens won its second title in 2015 and was promoted to the CFA2 for the 2015–16 season.

In 2001, whilst the club was playing in DH Burgogne and being managed by Hassan Harmatallah, the club qualified for the Last 16 of the Coupe de France, becoming the "Petit Poucet" of the event. The club was defeated 1–3 at the Stade de l'Abbé-Deschamps by Ligue 1 club Troyes AC. Until June 2007, the manager was former international goalkeeper Lionel Charbonnier. He was replaced by Jean-Louis Granié, who, prior, was in change of the reserve team.

=== Former presidents ===
- 1987–1990: Maurice Raymond
- 1990–1991: Jean-Maurice Lemaître
- 1992–1998: Jean-René Thiault
- 1998–1999: Jean-Michel Jacquinot
- 1999–2013: Maurice Raymond
- 2013—present: Dominique Paquais

=== Former managers ===
- 1987–88: Henri Atamaniuk
- 1988–90: Joël Guézet
- 1990–93: Serge Delamorre
- 1993–98: Jean-François Pien
- 1998–99: Zoran Zivkovic
- 1999–2001: Hassan Armatallah
- 2001 – November 2004: Joel Guézet
- November 2004 – 2005: Williams Vimbouly – Mohamed Elfares – Jean-Michel Edouard
- 2005–2007: Lionel Charbonnier
- Since 2007: Jean-Louis Granié

== Notable players ==
- (France) Bacary Sagna (youth)
