= Besançon Football =

French football club

- Founded: 2014; 11 years ago
- Ground: Stade Léo Lagrange, Besançon
- Capacity: 11,500
- Chairman: Samuel Kennel
- Manager: Benoît Pansier
- League: National 3 Group J
- 2022–23: National 3 Group E, 7th
- Website: http://www.besanconfoot.com

Besançon Football is a French football club based in Besançon. It plays at the Stade Léo Lagrange and plays in the Championnat National 3, the fifth tier in the French football league system.

The club was formed in June 2014 as Besançon FC, having evolved from the football section of Besançon ASPTT, whose place in Championnat de France Amateur 2 it took for the 2014–15 season.

In May 2017, Besançon FC merged with local club Promo Sports Besançon to form Besançon Football.

== Current squad ==
As of 6 March 2018

Note: Flags indicate national team as defined under FIFA eligibility rules; some limited exceptions apply. Players may hold more than one non-FIFA nationality.

No.	Pos.	Nation	Player
—	GK	(France) FRA	Etienne Cerutti
—	GK	(France) FRA	Simon Keller
—	GK	(France) FRA	Thibault Ontani
—	GK	(France) FRA	Robin Vauthey
—	DF	(France) FRA	Lucas Cuenin
—	DF	(France) FRA	Arthur Dirand
—	DF	(France) FRA	Sofiane El Achak
—	DF	(France) FRA	Ludovic Golliard
—	DF	(France) FRA	Guillaume Lafrance
—	DF	(France) FRA	Nicolas Pesenti
—	DF	(France) FRA	Victor Pillot
—	DF	(France) FRA	Thomas Viennet
—	DF	(France) FRA	Mickael Courtot
—	DF	(France) FRA	Mohamed Hamdache
—	DF	(France) FRA	Romain Boine
—	DF	(France) FRA	Isidore Nandjui
—	MF	(France) FRA	Jorys Adjakly

No.	Pos.	Nation	Player
—	MF	(France) FRA	Rafael Calonge
—	MF	(France) FRA	Yannick Cyprien
—	MF	(France) FRA	Victor Di Pinto
—	MF	(Portugal) POR	Rafaël Dias
—	MF	(France) FRA	Pierre Fainot
—	MF	(France) FRA	Adel Hacid
—	MF	(Portugal) POR	Jordan Machado
—	MF	(France) FRA	Madjid Mebrak
—	MF	(France) FRA	Pierre Cuynet
—	MF	(France) FRA	Elie Dussouillez
—	MF	(France) FRA	Nabil Hakkar
—	FW	(France) FRA	Kévin Atangana
—	FW	(France) FRA	Adrien De Morais
—	FW	(France) FRA	Gora Gueye
—	FW	(Chad) CHA	Marius Mbaiam
—	FW	(France) FRA	Ahmedou Cheikh
