= 1983 in association football =

The following are the association football events of the year 1983 throughout the world.

== Events ==
- May 11 – Scottish club Aberdeen win the European Cup Winners' Cup by beating Real Madrid 2–1 in the Ullevi Stadium, Gothenburg.
- May 25 – German club Hamburger SV defeats Italian champions Juventus 1–0 at the Olympic Stadium in Athens to win the European Cup.
- July 29 – Copa Libertadores 1983 won by Grêmio after defeating Peñarol on an aggregate score of 3–2.
- September 14 – Dutch club Groningen makes its European debut with a defeat (2–1) against Spain's Atlético Madrid in the first round of the UEFA Cup. On the same night, NEC makes its European club football debut with a 1–1 draw with Brann in the first round (first leg) of the Cup Winners' Cup.
- December 11 – Brazilian club Grêmio wins the Intercontinental Cup in Tokyo by defeating West Germany's Hamburger SV 2–1 in extra-time. The winning goal is scored by Renato Gaúcho.

== Winners club national championship ==
=== Asia ===
- Qatar – Al-Arabi

=== Europe ===
- Denmark – Lyngby
- England – Liverpool
- France – Nantes
- Italy – AS Roma
- Netherlands – Ajax
- Portugal – Benfica
- Scotland – Dundee United
- Spain – Athletic Bilbao
- Turkey – Fenerbahçe
- West Germany – Hamburger SV
- Yugoslavia – Partizan

=== North America ===
- Mexico – Puebla
- United States / Canada:
  - Tulsa Roughnecks (NASL)

=== South America ===
- Argentina
  - Metropolitano – Independiente
  - Nacional – Estudiantes La Plata
- Bolivia – Bolívar
- Brazil – Flamengo
- Colombia – América de Cali
- Paraguay – Olimpia Asunción

== International tournaments ==
- 1983 British Home Championship (February 23 – June 1, 1983)

England

- Pan American Games in Caracas, Venezuela (August 15 – August 27, 1983)
  1. Uruguay
  2. Guatemala
  3. Brazil
- Copa América (August 10 – November 4, 1983)
  1. Uruguay
  2. Brazil
  3. Paraguay and Peru

== Births ==
- January 1
  - Shaheen Ali, Qatari footballer
  - Calum Davenport, English footballer
  - Daniel Jarque, Spanish footballer (d. 2009)
- January 3
  - Bilel Gontassi, Tunisian footballer
  - Mathieu Guy, French professional footballer
- January 14 – Jan Ahlvik, Finnish footballer
- January 15 – Jermaine Pennant, English youth international
- January 21
  - Victor, Brazilian international
  - Ranko Despotović, Serbian international
  - Billy Mwanza, Zambian international
  - Moritz Volz, German footballer
- January 22 – Getúlio Vargas, Brazilian retired footballer
- January 24 – Shaun Maloney, Scottish international and manager
- January 29 – Biagio Pagano, Italian footballer
- February 3 – Jakub Cieciura, Polish professional footballer
- February 5 – Víctor Fagundez, Uruguayan footballer
- February 11 – Rafael van der Vaart, Dutch international footballer
- February 15 – Daniel Almaral, Mexican football manager and former player
- February 18 – Jermaine Jenas, English international footballer
- March 2 – Kolawole Agodirin, Nigerian footballer
- March 7 – Daniel Jurč, Slovak footballer
- March 11 – Adil Mezgour, Moroccan former footballer
- March 15 – Mark Magennis, Northern Irish retired footballer
- March 19 – Ali Rabee, Emirati footballer
- March 25 – Fabio Marinho, retired Brazilian footballer
- March 27 – Alan Patrick Monegat, Brazilian former footballer
- March 28 – Homero Sartori, Argentine-Brazilian former professional footballer
- April 1 – Mamoudou Sy, French basketball player
- April 12 – Damian Krajanowski, Polish footballer
- April 22
  - Sebastjan Čelofiga, Slovenian retired footballer
  - Douglas Silva, Brazilian footballer
- May 2 – Mónica Vergara, Mexican female footballer
- May 3 – Márton Fülöp, Hungarian international footballer (died 2015)
- May 4 – Rubén Olivera, Uruguayan international footballer
- May 6
  - Nicolás Gásperi, Argentine professional footballer
  - Kim Seok-woo, South Korean footballer
- May 16 – Edilio Cardoso, Brazilian footballer
- May 17 – Albert Batsa, Togolese footballer
- May 20 – Sinecio León, Paraguayan footballer
- May 21 – Jason Boxhill, Barbadian footballer
- May 24 – Martin Schmidt, German former footballer
- June 3 – Alexis Salazar, Chilean former footballer
- June 6 – Kimbell Ward, Saint Kitts and Nevis football referee
- June 7 – Tshiabola Mapanya, retired Congolese footballer
- June 25 – Robin Ganemyr, retired Swedish footballer
- July 6 – María de Jesús Castillo, Mexican female footballer
- July 7 – Jakub Wawrzyniak, Polish footballer
- July 18 – Carlos Diogo, Uruguayan footballer
- July 21 – Vladimir Niyonkuru, Burundian footballer
- July 24 – Daniele De Rossi, Italian international footballer
- July 25 – Pedro Zabála, Bolivian international footballer
- July 26 – Romain Chevrier, French professional footballer
- July 28 – Erivélton, Brazilian footballer
- August 4 – Kang Dong-gu, South Korean footballer
- August 5 – Jean-Séraphin Mbessa, Cameroonian former professional footballer
- August 6 – Robin van Persie, Dutch international footballer
- August 12 – Tomasz Balul, Polish former footballer
- August 24 – Gabriel López, Uruguayan footballer
- August 26 – Owen Kaposa, retired Zambian footballer
- September 8 – Marcin Truszkowski, Polish retired footballer
- September 16 – Richard Leite, Paraguayan footballer
- September 28 – Richard Henyekane, South African international footballer (died 2015)
- September 30 – Driss Himmes, French midfielder
- October 1 – Fance Hariyanto, Indonesian former footballer
- October 4 – Gwenaël Renaud, French former professional footballer
- October 8 – Michael Fraser, Scottish club goalkeeper
- October 16 – Steven Goaxab, Namibian footballer
- October 20 – Luis Saritama, Ecuadorian footballer
- November 9 – Denis Rustan, former Russian professional footballer
- November 11 – Philipp Lahm, German international footballer
- November 14 – Kevon Carter, Trinidadian international footballer (died 2014)
- November 15 – Anton Samoylov, former Russian professional footballer
- November 16 – Ron Koperli, Israeli football manager
- November 26 – Marine Kakhidze, Georgian footballer
- December 5 – Wilfrido Vinces, Ecuadorian footballer
- December 8 – Valéry Mézague, Cameroonian international footballer (died 2014)
- December 9 – Kennedy Omogi, Kenyan footballer
- December 10
  - Lewis Buxton, English club footballer
  - Habib Mohamed, Ghanaian international footballer

== Deaths ==
=== January ===
- January 20 – Garrincha, Brazilian striker, winner of the 1958 and 1962 FIFA World Cups. Regarded by many as the best dribbler in football history.(49)
- January 28 – Claude Papi, French footballer (33)

=== March ===
- March 24 – Manuel Fleitas Solich, Paraguayan footballer and manager (83)

=== June ===
- June 26 – Luis Alamos, Chilean football manager (59)

=== July ===
- July 5 – Hennes Weisweiler, German footballer and manager (63)
- July 29 – Manuel Ferreira, Argentine striker, runner up of the 1930 FIFA World Cup and player of the tournament of the 1929 South American Championship. (77)

=== September ===
- September 9 – Luis Monti, Argentine/Italian striker, winner of the 1934 FIFA World Cup. Monti has the distinction of having played in two FIFA World Cup final matches with two different national teams. (82)
- September 20 - Andy Beattie, Scottish international footballer and manager (born 1913)

=== October ===
- October 4 – Juan López Fontana, Uruguayan manager, winner of the 1950 FIFA World Cup. (75)
