= Mamoudou =

Mamoudou is a given name. Notable people with the name include:

- Mamoudou Athie (born 1988), American actor
- Mamoudou Hanne (born 1988), French, former Malian, sprint athlete
- Mamoudou Kondo (born 1990), Malian footballer
- Mamoudou Mara (born 1990), Guinean footballer
- Mamoudou Sy (born 1983), French basketball player
