= Samoylov =

Samoylov, Samoilov (Russian: Самойлов) or Samoilovs (Latvian transliteration) is a Russian masculine surname, its feminine counterpart is Samoylova Samoilova. It may refer to

- Alexander Samoylov (1744–1814), a Russian general and statesman
- Alexander Filippovich Samoylov (1867-1930), Russian pioneer of electrocardiography
- Aleksandrs Samoilovs (born 1985), Latvian beach volleyball player
- Anton Samoylov (born 1983), Russian football player
- David Samoylov (1920–1990), Soviet poet
- Dmitri Samoylov (footballer, born 1990), Russian football player
- Dmitri Samoylov (footballer, born 1993), Russian football player
- Dmitry Samoylov (pilot) (1922-2012), Soviet fighter pilot
- Inna Sergeyevna Shcherbina-Samoylova (1922-2003), Russian astronomer and astrophysicist
- Konkordiya Samoilova (1876–1921), Russian bolshevik
- Maksim Samoylov (1981–2024), Russian football player
- Oksana Samoylova (born 1988), Russian model
- Pavel Samoylov (born 1982), Russian football player
- Tatiana Samoylova (1934–2014), Russian and Soviet actress
- Vadim and Gleb Samoylov, leaders of the Russian rock band Agatha Christie (band)
- Vasily Samoylov (1813–1887), Russian actor
- Vitali Samoilov (born 1962), Russian-born Latvian ice-hockey player
- Vitaliy Samoylov (born 1975), Ukrainian football player
- Yekaterina Samoylova (1763–1830), Russian noble and lady-in-waiting
- Yevgeny Samoylov (1912–2006), a Soviet actor
- Yuliya Samoylova (born 1989), Russian singer
- Countess Yuliya Samoylova (1803–1875)
