= Homero =

Homero is a masculine given name, especially the Spanish and Portuguese form of Homer. Notable people with the name include:

- Homero Alsina Thevenet (1922–2005), Uruguayan journalist and film critic
- Homero Aridjis (born 1940), Mexican poet, novelist, environmental activist, and journalist
- Homero Blancas (born 1938), American professional golfer
- Homero Calderón (born 1993), Venezuelan footballer
- Homero Cárdenas Guillén (1966–2014), Mexican suspected drug lord
- Homero Cárpena (1910–2001), Argentine film actor
- Homero Cavalheiro (1947–2021), Brazilian footballer and manager
- Homero Expósito (1918–1987), Argentine poet and tango songwriter
- Homero Francesch (born 1947), Uruguay-born Swiss pianist
- Homero Gómez González (1969 or 1970–2020), Mexican environmental activist, agricultural engineer, and politician
- Homero Hidrobo (1939–1979), Ecuadorian classical guitarist
- Homero Laddaga (born 1941), Mexican sports shooter
- Homero Leite Meira (1931–2014), Brazilian Roman Catholic bishop
- Homero Manzi (1907–1951), Argentine tango lyricist
- Homero Patrón (1951–2012), Mexican arranger, producer, musician, and composer
- Homero Richards (born 1976), Mexican race car driver
- Homero Ríos Murrieta (born 1974), Mexican politician
- Homero Sartori (born 1983), Argentine-Brazilian footballer
