= Homer (name) =

Homer is both a masculine given name and a surname. The ancient Greek poet Homer and cartoon character Homer Simpson are particularly prominent holders of the name. Other notable Homers include:

== Given name ==
- Homer Burton Adkins (1892–1949), American chemist
- Homer Martin Adkins (1890–1964), Governor of Arkansas
- Homer D. Angell (1875–1968), American politician
- Homer Banks (1941–2003), African-American songwriter, singer and record producer
- Homer G. Barber (1830–1909), American politician
- Homer Brightman (1901–1988), American screenwriter
- Homer M. Butler (1904–1982), American newspaper editor and politician
- Homer E. Capehart (1897–1979), American businessman and politician, longtime US senator from Indiana
- Homer M. Carr (1878–1964) American politician
- Homer Stille Cummings (1870–1956), United States Attorney General
- Homer Davenport (1867–1912), American political cartoonist, writer and horse breeder
- Homer Davis, Jamaican politician
- Homer B. Dibell (1864–1934), Minnesota Supreme Court justice
- Homer E. A. Dick (1884–1942), American politician
- Homer Emens (1862-1930), American scenic designer
- Homer L. Ferguson (1873–1953), American author and businessman
- Homer S. Ferguson (1889–1982), US Senator from Michigan
- Homer Gere (Born 2000), American actor
- Homer Gilbert (1909–1943), aka Knuckles Boyle, American football player
- Homer A. Glore (1874–1944), American medical doctor and politician
- Homer Griffith (1912–1990), American football player
- Homer Hickam (born 1943), American author and NASA engineer whose autobiography was the basis of the 1999 film October Sky
- Homer A. Holt (1898–1975), American lawyer and politician, Governor of West Virginia
- Homer Hulbert (1863–1949), American missionary, journalist and political activist
- Homer A. Jack (1916–1993), American clergyman, pacifist and social activist
- Homer Jacobson (fl. 1950s and '60s), American retired chemistry professor
- Homer Jones (American football) (1941–2023), American former football player
- Homer Jones (economist) (1906–1986), American economist
- Homer Jones (politician) (1893–1970), American politician
- Homer Eaton Keyes (1875–1938), American author and professor
- Homer Ledford (1927–2006), instrument maker and bluegrass musician
- Homer L. Lyon (1879–1956), American politician
- Homer Martin (labor leader) (1901–1968), American trade unionist and socialist
- Homer C. Martin, American college football head coach (1923–1926, 1936)
- Homer Dodge Martin (1836–1897), American artist
- Homer Mensch (1914–2005), classical bassist
- Homer V. M. Miller (1814–1896), US senator from Georgia
- Homer Neal (1942–2018), American particle physicist and professor
- Homer Nelson (Wisconsin politician) (1826–1894), American politician
- Homer Augustus Nelson (1829–1891), American politician and Civil War colonel
- Homer Pearson (1900–1985), American politician from Colorado
- Homer Plessy (1862–1925), African-American anti-segregationist activist, plaintiff in the United States Supreme Court case Plessy v. Ferguson
- Homer Rice (1927–2024), American football player and coach
- Homer Elihu Royce (1820–1891), American lawyer, politician and jurist
- Homer Se (born 1977), former Philippine Basketball Association player
- Homer L. Shantz (1876–1958), American botanist and President of the University of Arizona
- Homer Smith (1895–1962), American physiologist and advocate for science
- Homer Smith (American football) (1931–2011), American college football player and head coach
- Homer Sprague (1829–1918), American military officer, author and educator
- Homer Sykes (born 1949), Canadian-born British photographer
- Homer Tate (1884–1975), American artist
- Homer L. Thomas (1913–2003), American art historian and archaeologist
- Homer Thompson (1906–2000), Canadian archaeologist
- Homer Thompson (baseball) (1891–1957), American Major League Baseball catcher for one game
- Homer Watson (1855–1936), Canadian landscape painter
- Homer B. Woods (1869–1941), justice of the Supreme Court of Appeals of West Virginia

== Surname ==
- Homer (surname)

== Fictional characters ==
- Homer Simpson, in the animated TV series The Simpsons.
- Homer Simpson, in the 1939 novel The Day of the Locust and its 1975 film adaptation.
- Homer Price, in Homer Price and Centerburg Tales, children's books by Robert McCloskey.
- Homer, a stage name/character in the American country music comedy duo Homer and Jethro.
- Homer Wells, protagonist of John Irving's novel The Cider House Rules (novel).
- Homer, sidekick of Snidely Whiplash.
- Homer, in the comic strip Non Sequitur.
- Homer Adlawan, a character from the Filipino action drama series FPJ's Ang Probinsyano.
- Homer Parrish, a character in the film The Best Years of Our Lives.
- Homer Pigeon, a cartoon character.
- Homer Roberts, in Netflix's The OA.
- Homer Yannos, a character from John Marsden's novel Tomorrow, When the War Began.
- Homer D. Poe, the mascot of The Home Depot.
- Homer Zuckerman, a character in E. B. White's children's novel Charlotte's Web.

== See also ==
- Homero, the Spanish and Portuguese form of the name
- Homère, the French form of the name
