= Ali Rabee =

Ali Rabee may refer to:

- Ali Rabee (footballer, born 1981), Emirati football defender
- Ali Rabee (footballer, born 1983), Emirati football goalkeeper
