= Oyelola =

- Gender: Unisex
- Language: Yoruba

Origin
- Origin: Nigeria
- Meaning: "Deserves Favor"
- Region of origin: South-west Nigeria

Oyelola (Oyelola.ogg) (meaning "deserves favor") is a Yoruba unisex given name.

== Notable people with the name ==
- Kolawole Oyelola Agodirin (born 2 March 1983) is a Nigerian footballer.
- Oyelola Yisa Ashiru (born 14 June 1955) is a Nigerian architect and politician.
- Ayo Oyelola (born 19 October 1998) is an NFL safety.
