= Kolawole =

Kolawole is both a surname and a given name. Notable people with the name include:

- Antoine Idji Kolawolé (born 1946), Beninese politician
- Esther Kolawole (born 2002), Nigerian wrestler
- Peter Kolawole (born 1990), Nigerian footballer
- Kolawole Agodirin (born 1983), Nigerian footballer
- The protagonist of the story "Wintering of Mr. Kolawole" by Oscar Dathorne
