= Gabriel López =

Gabriel López may refer to:

- Gabriel López (footballer, born 1983), Uruguayan footballer
- Gabriel López (footballer, born 2003), Mexican footballer
- Gabriel López (actor) (born 1991), Venezuelan singer and television actor
- Gabriel López Rosado, Mexican politician
- Gabriel López Zapiain, Mexican footballer
