= Alan Patrick =

Alan Patrick may refer to:

- Alan Patrick (footballer, born 1983), Alan Patrick Monegat, Brazilian football midfielder
- Alan Patrick (footballer, born 1991), Alan Patrick Lourenço, Brazilian football midfielder for Internacional
- Alan Patrick (fighter) (born 1983), Brazilian fighter
