= Komer =

Komer is a surname. Notable people with the surname include:

- Jaime Komer (born 1981), American water polo player
- Robert Komer (1922–2000), American diplomat

== See also ==
- Homer (name)
