= Douglas Silva (disambiguation) =

Douglas Silva (born 1988) is a Brazilian actor.

Douglas Silva may also refer to:

- Douglas Silva (footballer, born 1974), Brazilian football manager and former midfielder
- Douglas Silva (footballer, born 1983) (Douglas Silva Delfino), Brazilian football defensive midfielder
- Douglas Silva (footballer, born 1999) (Douglas da Silva Santos), Brazilian football right back
- Douglas da Silva (born 1984), Brazilian football defender
- Douglas Silva de Andrade (born 1985), Brazilian mixed martial artist
