= Getúlio Vargas (disambiguation) =

Getúlio Vargas (1882–1954) was a Brazilian politician who served as the 14th and 17th President of Brazil.

Getúlio Vargas may also refer to:

- Getúlio Vargas (footballer) (born 1983), Brazilian footballer
- Getúlio Vargas, Rio Grande do Sul, a municipality in Rio Grande do Sul, Brazil
- Fundação Getulio Vargas, a Brazilian higher education institution
