= Falkenbergs FF =

Association football club in Falkenberg, Sweden

Falkenberg
- Full name: Falkenbergs Fotbollförening
- Founded: 3 January 1928; 98 years ago
- Ground: Falcon Alkoholfri Arena, Falkenberg
- Capacity: 5,500
- Chairman: Patrik Hannell
- Head coach: Christoffer Andersson
- League: Superettan
- 2025: Superettan, 5th of 16
- Website: http://www.falkenbergsff.se/
Home colours	Away colours

Falkenbergs Fotbollsförening, also known simply as Falkenbergs FF, Falkenberg or (especially locally) FFF, is a Swedish football club based in Falkenberg. Formed on 3 January 1928, the club has played five seasons in the countrys top division Allsvenskan and currently play in the second highest division. Falkenberg are affiliated with Hallands Fotbollförbund and play their home games at Falcon Alkoholfri Arena.

== History ==
The first Falkenbergs FF team in 1928.

Falkenbergs FF was founded in 1928 in response to the towns general sports club Falkenbergs Gymnastiksällskap shutting down their football team. A group of small Falkenberg-based football teams met and decided to join forces and create the new club. Their first ever game was played on 25 March 1928 in a friendly win against Varbergs BoIS who would go on to become their long time local rivals.

During the first thirty seasons of Falkenbergs FF the club spent most of its time in the third tier of Swedish football. The lowpoint came in the early seventies when Falkenberg had dropped to the seventh tier. However, they would then start ascending in the Swedish league system, earning two consecutive promotions in 1986 to Division 2 and in 1987 to Division 1, which at the time was the second tier of Swedish football. The following 1988 season Falkenberg played in the second division for the first time ever.

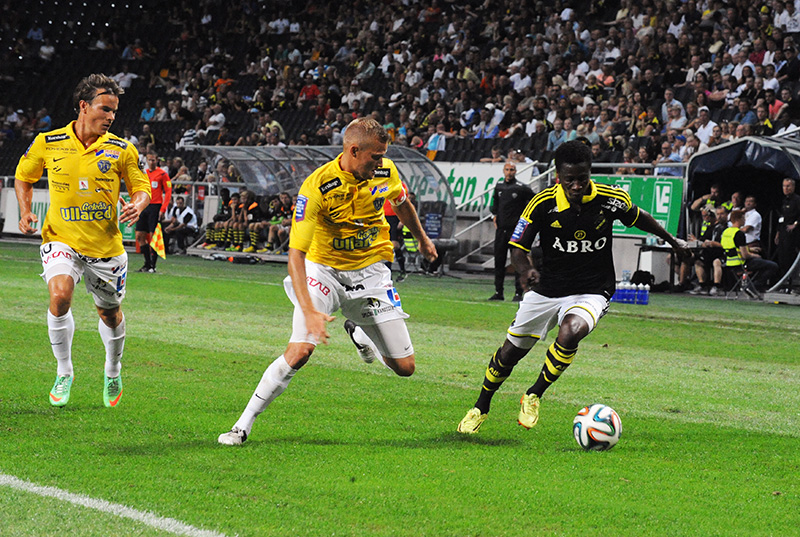
Falkenberg playing against AIK in the 2014 Allsvenskan.

In 1998 Falkenbergs FF led Division 1 Södra after twelve games and had their sights set on qualifying for Allsvenskan. But the club's success would not last all 26 rounds and they finished seventh in the league table. The club would have to wait 15 more years until the 2013 Superettan season where they won the league and for the first time ever qualified for Swedens top flight. They would go on to play the next three years in Allsvenskan before being relegated and then a couple of years later spend two more seasons in the nations highest division.

After their second relegation the club continued to be relegated to the third tier instantly the next season but were able to return to Superettan once again after three years.

== Kit ==
Falkenberg players wearing their home kit in 2023.

Falkenbergs FF play in yellow shirts with white shorts and socks.

After 14 years of playing in Nike shirts the club announced that they had signed with Adidas to be their new kit manufacturer starting from the 2020 season and forward.

Period	Kit manufacturer	Shirt sponsor (chest)
2006–2012	(United States) Nike	?
2013–2019	(United States) Nike	Gekås
2020–	(Germany) Adidas	Gekås

== Recent seasons ==
Summary of the ten most recent seasons for Falkenbergs FF:

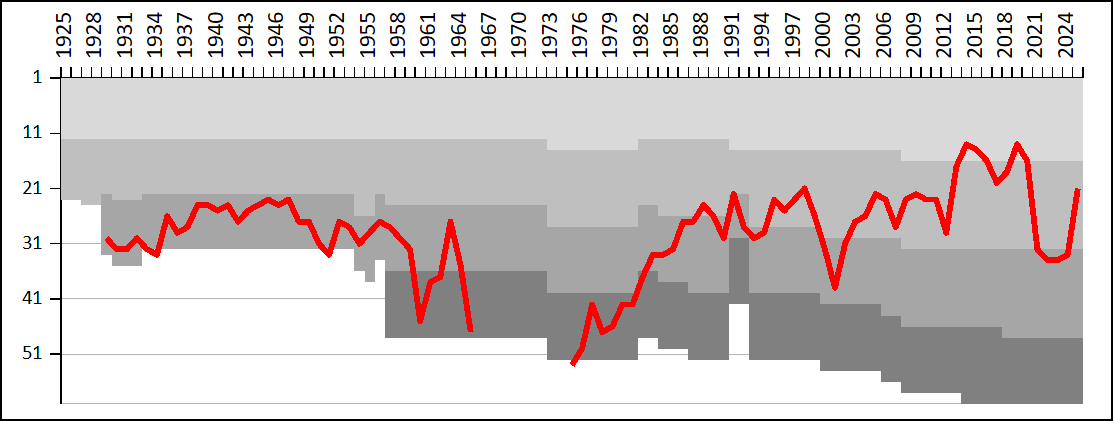
A chart showing the progress of Falkenbergs FF through the Swedish football league system. The different shades of gray represent league divisions.

Season	Division	Tier	Pos	Pl	W	D	L	+	-	P	Cup	Attendances
2016	Allsvenskan	1	↓ 16	30	2	4	24	25	84	10	Group stage	2,928
2017	Superettan	2	4	30	12	12	6	50	39	48	2nd round	2,889
2018	Superettan	2	↑ 2	30	18	5	7	61	34	59	Group stage	2,818
2019	Allsvenskan	1	13	30	6	7	17	25	62	25	Quarterfinals	3,732
2020	Allsvenskan	1	↓ 16	30	5	9	16	33	54	24	Group stage	0
2021	Superettan	2	↓ 16	30	6	7	17	34	55	25	Group stage	878
2022	Ettan	3	2	30	19	7	4	64	21	64	–	1,354
2023	Ettan	3	2	30	20	7	3	72	24	67	2nd round	1,357
2024	Ettan	3	↑ 1	30	19	6	5	51	19	63	2nd round	1,333
2025	Superettan	2	5	30	12	10	8	53	36	46	Group stage	2,510

== Stadiums ==
Falkenberg originally played their home games at Falkenbergs IP, a mixed use stadium with running tracks. In 2017 they moved into the newly built 5,500 capacity football stadium Falcon Alkoholfri Arena. The name, which is sponsored by Falcon Brewery and translates to "Falcon Non-alcoholic Arena", quickly became viral in Sweden after its announcement and is credited by local politicians for putting the city of Falkenberg on the map nationally.

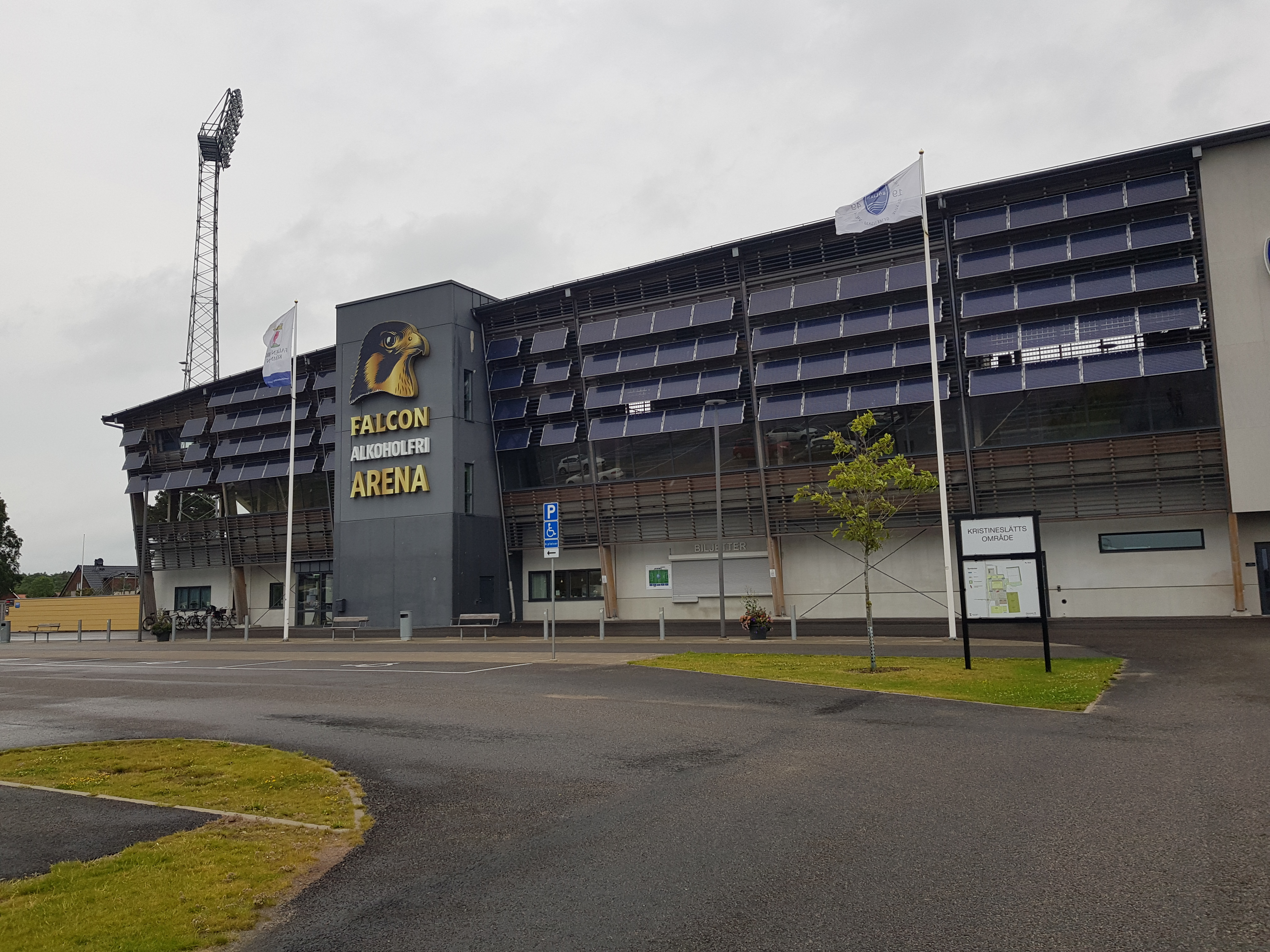
The stadium exterior in 2020.

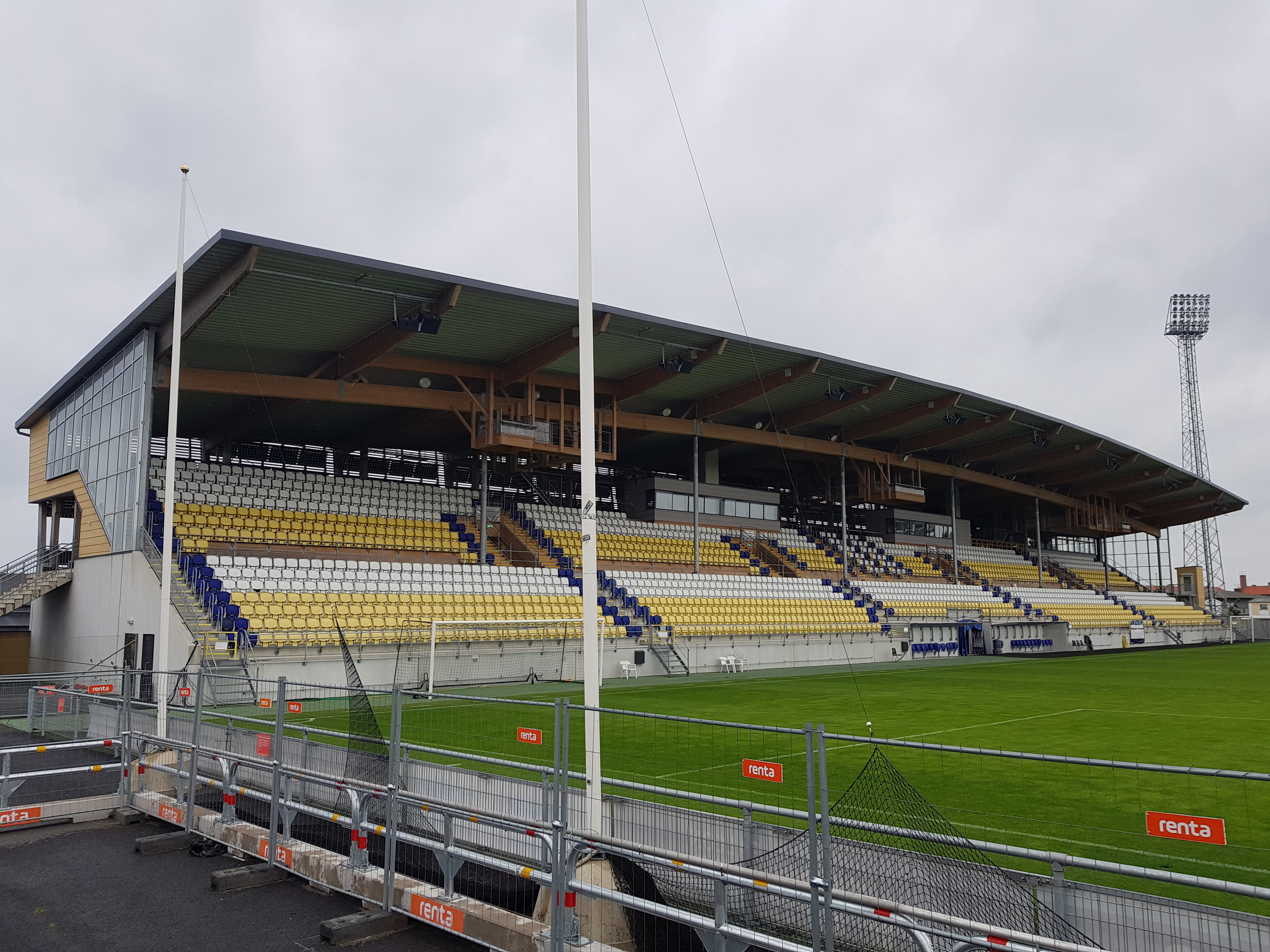
One of the two main stands.

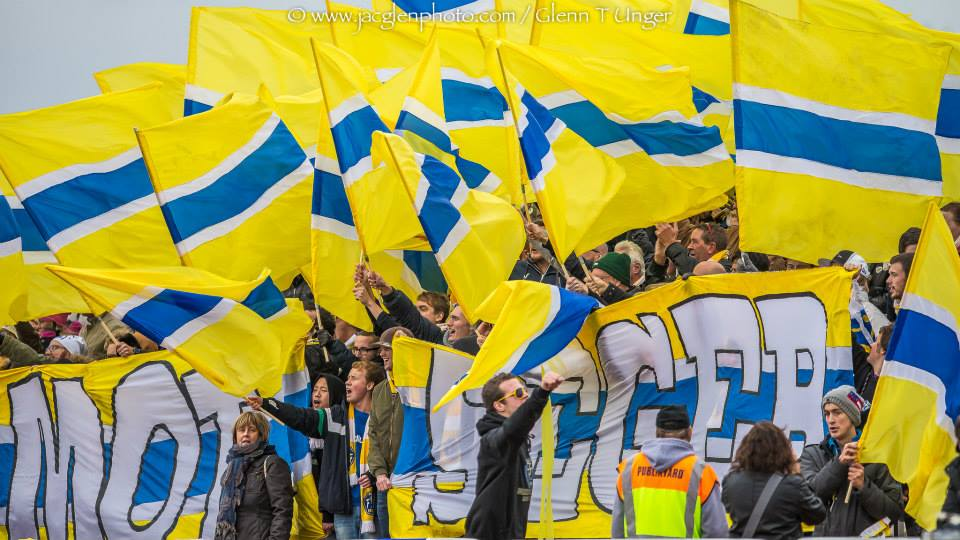
A tifo by the Falkenberg fans in 2017.

== Players ==
=== First-team squad ===
As of 4 November 2026

Note: Flags indicate national team as defined under FIFA eligibility rules; some limited exceptions apply. Players may hold more than one non-FIFA nationality.

No.	Pos.	Nation	Player
1	GK	SWE	Anton Andersson
2	DF	SWE	Gabriel Johansson
4	DF	SWE	Tim Stålheden
5	DF	SWE	Noel Hansson
6	DF	SWE	Linus Borgström
8	DF	SWE	Nils Bertilsson
9	FW	SWE	Albin Andersson
10	MF	SWE	Elias Mohammad
11	MF	SWE	Hampus Källström
12	DF	SWE	Ayo Rupia-Ellis
14	FW	SWE	William Videhult
15	DF	SWE	Wilton Ljunggren

No.	Pos.	Nation	Player
17	DF	KOS	Argjend Miftari
18	MF	CIV	Lass Sangaré
19	MF	SWE	Oskar Lindberg
21	MF	SWE	Lion Beqiri
23	DF	SWE	Alexander Salo
24	DF	SWE	Nils Persson
25	MF	SWE	Gazton Alexandersson
28	MF	SWE	Melker Nilsson
29	FW	FRA	Hugo Komano
30	MF	NGR	Godwin Aguda
31	GK	SWE	Gustav Lillienberg
-	GK	SWE	Alexander Carlsson (on loan from IFK Göteborg)

=== Out on loan ===
Note: Flags indicate national team as defined under FIFA eligibility rules; some limited exceptions apply. Players may hold more than one non-FIFA nationality.

No. / Pos. / Nation / Player; 3 / MF / SWE / Noel Lundgren (at Tvååkers IF until 30 November 2026)	No. / Pos. / Nation / Player; — / MF / SWE / Melwin Kocanovic (at IF Böljan until 30 November 2026)

=== Notable players ===
The following 18 players were picked for the Falkenbergs FF "best of 2007–2020" squad in newspaper Hallands Nyheter:

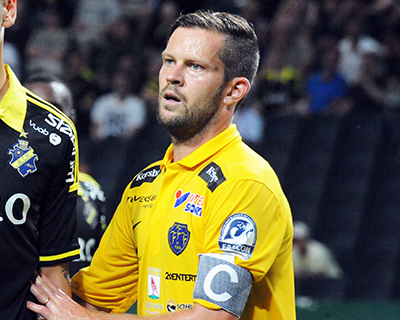
Former team captain David Svensson represented Falkenbergs FF throughout his whole career as a one-club man, playing a total of 413 games for the club.

Name	Years
(Sweden) Hampus Nilsson	2017–2019
(Sweden) Erik Berg	2008–2011
(Sweden) Daniel Johansson	2009–2017
(Sweden) Patrik Lundgren	1998–2007
(Sweden) Adam Eriksson	2012–2015
(Sweden) Jesper Karlsson	2016
(Sweden) David Svensson	2000–2017
(Sweden) Robin Ganemyr	2007–2012
(Sweden) Niclas Eliasson	2013
(Sweden) Stefan Rodevåg	2004–2006, 2009–2017
(Sweden) Gustaf Nilsson	2014–2016
(Sweden) Otto Martler	2013–2016
(Sweden) Björn Carlsson	2003–2009
(Sweden) Jens Gustafsson	2003–2009
(Nigeria) Dominic Chatto	2017–2019
(Sweden) Joel Anell	2007–2008
(Sweden) Victor Sköld	2012–2013
(Sweden) Daniel Alexandersson	1997, 2000–2003, 2010–2011

== Management ==
=== Technical staff ===
As of 22 October 2026

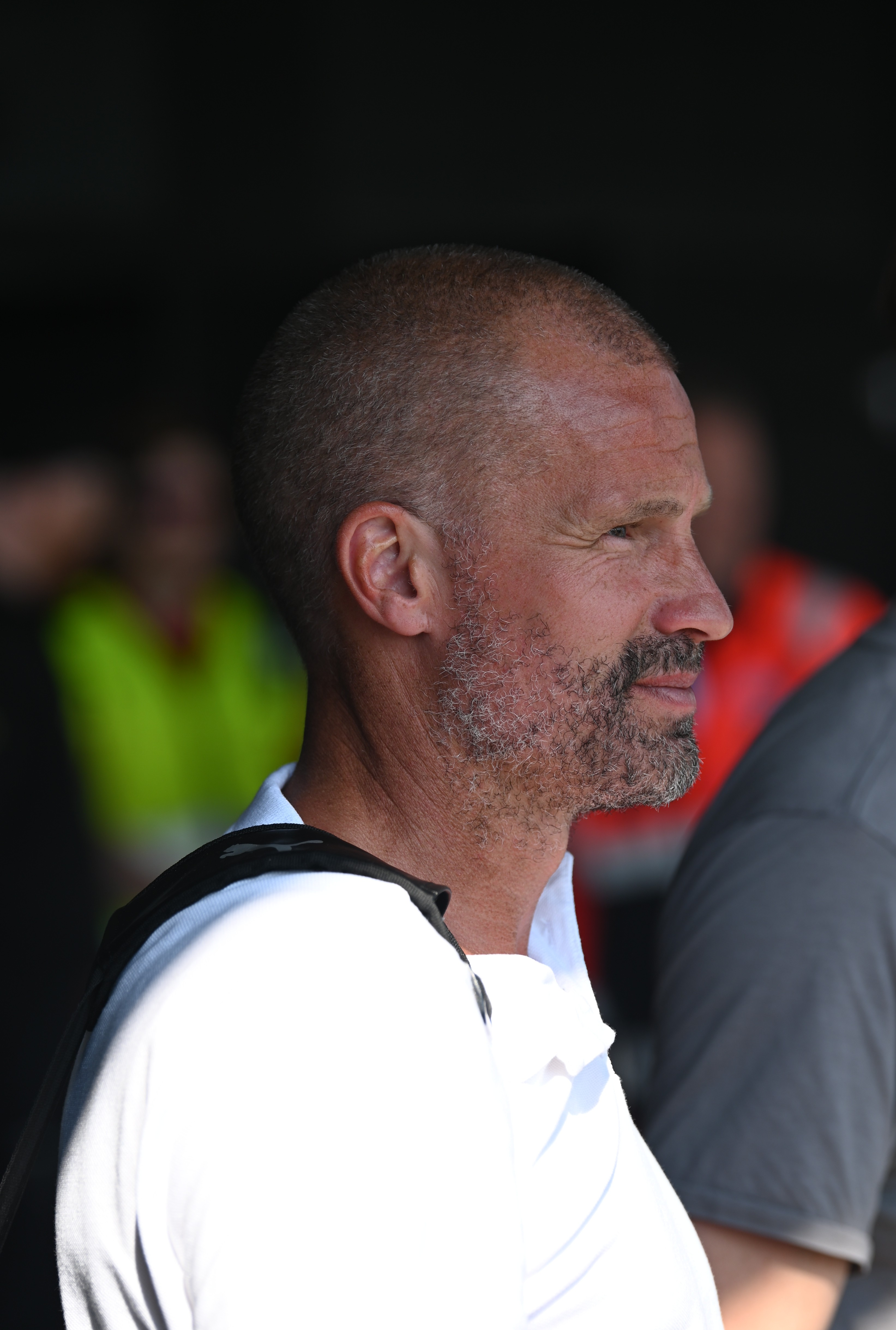
Former Sweden national team player Christoffer Andersson is the current head coach of Falkenbergs FF.

Name	Role
(Sweden) Andreas Jankevics	Sporting director
(Sweden) Christoffer Andersson	Head coach
(Sweden) Tobias Tuvesson	Assistant coach
(Lebanon) Abbas Hassan	Goalkeeping coach
(Sweden) Mårten Hansen	Fitness coach
(Sweden) Sverker Nilsson	Club doctor
(Sweden) Jetullah Brahimi	Equipment manager
(Sweden) Lars Kärrå	Equipment manager

=== Managerial history ===
- (Sweden) Thure Claesson (1929–31)
- (Sweden) Henning Svensson (1932–33)
- (Sweden) Tobbi Svenson (1934–46)
- (Sweden) Erik Göransson (1947)
- (Sweden) Henry Antfors (1948–50)
- (Sweden) Nils Rydell (1951)
- (Sweden) Gösta Lambertsson (1952)
- (Sweden) Tobbi Svenson (1953–54)
- (Sweden) Gunnar Rydberg & Axel Löfgren (1955)
- (Sweden) Gunnar Rydberg (1956)
- (Sweden) John Vikdahl (1957–58)
- (Sweden) Rune Ludvigsson & Fingal Mårtensson (1959)
- (Sweden) Ingemar Pettersson (1960)
- (Sweden) Gunnar Svensson (1961–63)
- (Sweden) Rolf Johansson (1964–65)
- (Sweden) Gunnar Svensson (1966–67)
- (Sweden) Hans Ambrosius (1968)
- (Sweden) Alf Jönsson (1969–70)
- (Sweden) Ove Bernhard & Rolf Jakobsson (1971–72)
- (Sweden) Hans Ambrosius (1973)
- (Sweden) Lars Nylander (1974–76)
- (Sweden) Jan Anders Andersson (1977–79)
- (Sweden) Bengt Carnelid (1980–81)
- (Sweden) Hasse Selander (1982–84)
- (Sweden) PG Skoglund (1985–86)
- (Sweden) Olle Kristenson (1987–89)
- (England) Bryan King (1990–91)
- (Sweden) Stig Kristensson (1992–96)
- (Sweden) Rutger Backe & Sven Sjöholm (1997)
- (Sweden) Roberto Jakobsson (1997–99)
- (Sweden) Uno Andersson (2000–01)
- (Sweden) Örjan Glans (2002–03)
- (Sweden) Lars Borgström (2004)
- (Sweden) Stig Kristensson (2004–07)
- (Sweden) Thomas Askebrand (2008–12)
- (Sweden) Hans Eklund (2013)
- (Sweden) Henrik Larsson (2014)
- (Sweden) Hans Eklund (2015–21)
- (Sweden) Tobias Tuvesson (2021–22)
- (Sweden) Christoffer Andersson (2022–present)

== Achievements ==
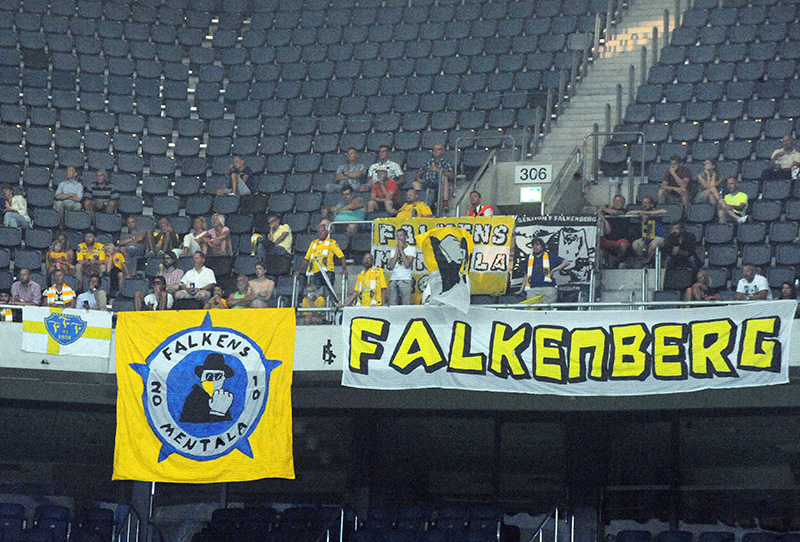
Travelling Falkenberg away supporters.

=== League ===
- Superettan:
  - Winners (1): 2013
