= Falcon Alkoholfri Arena =

Association football stadium in Falkenberg, Sweden

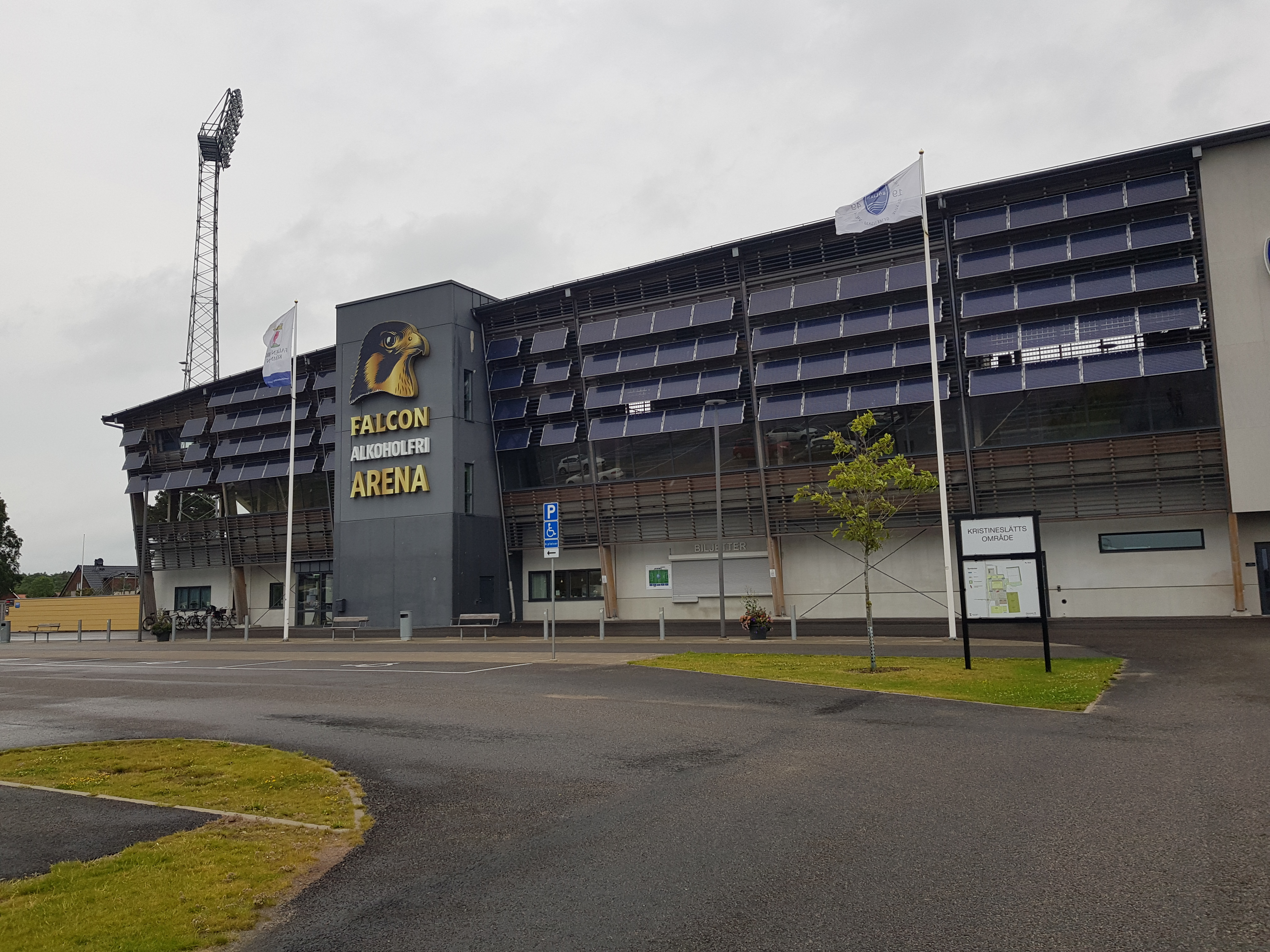
- Falcon Alkoholfri Arena
- Interactive map of Falcon Alkoholfri Arena
- Former names: Falkenberg Arena
- Address: Kristineslättsallén 1
- Location: Falkenberg, Sweden
- Coordinates: 56.8940°N 12.5115°E
- Owner: Falkenberg Municipality
- Capacity: 5,500
- Surface: Grass

Construction
- Opened: 2 April 2017

Tenants
- Falkenbergs FF; IF Böljan

Falcon Alkoholfri Arena is a football stadium in Falkenberg, Sweden. It is home to Division 1 club Falkenbergs FF and seats 5,500 spectators. The naming rights for the stadium are owned by Carlsberg Group, and the stadium is named after the Carlsberg-owned beer brand Falcon. Swedish law does not allow for the marketing of alcoholic drinks, hence the choice to name it after their alcohol-free variant.

It was inaugurated on 2 April 2017 with the Superettan game Falkenbergs FF–Östers IF, 0–2.

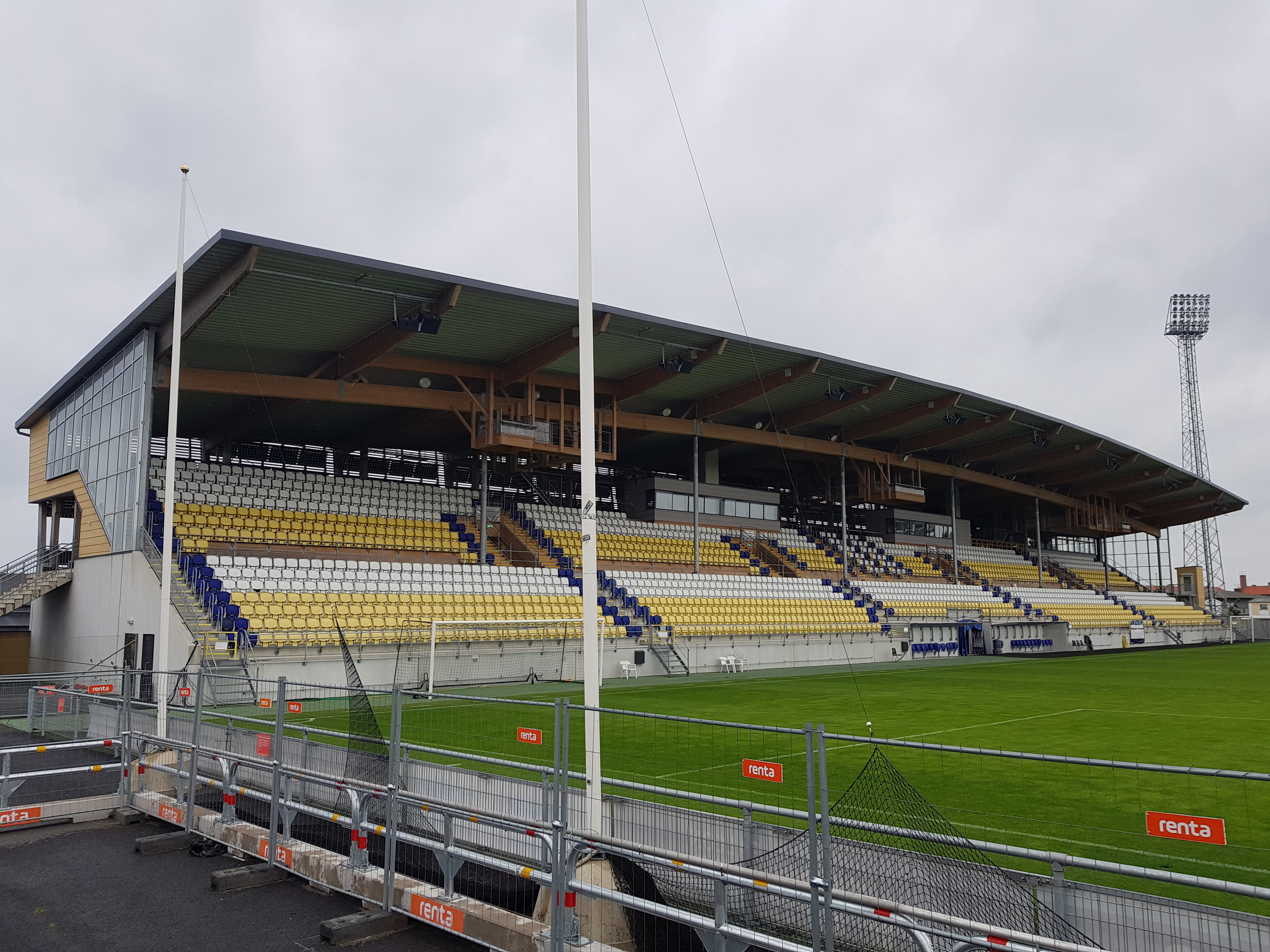

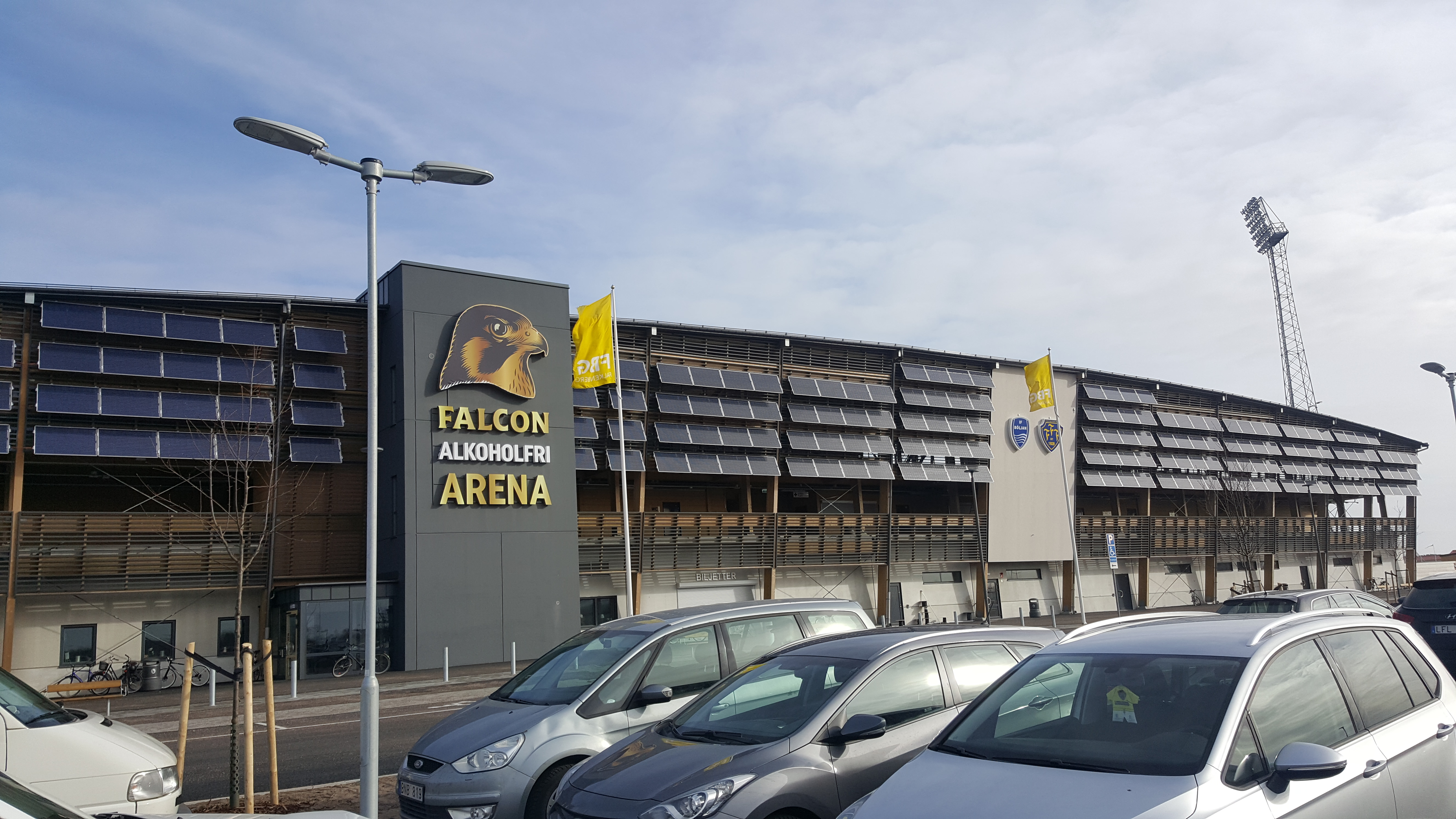
