= Scannella =

Scannella is a surname. Notable people with the surname include:

- Joe Scannella (1928–2018), American football player and coach of American and Canadian football
- Mickaël Scannella (born 1987), French footballer
