= Gabriel Johansson =

Swedish footballer (born 2000)

Personal information
- Full name: Gabriel Johansson
- Date of birth: 10 September 2000 (age 26)
- Place of birth: Sweden
- Position: Centre-back

Team information
- Current team: Falkenbergs FF
- Number: 2

Youth career
- –2019: Falkenbergs FF

Senior career*
Years	Team	Apps	(Gls)
2020–	Falkenbergs FF	83	(2)
2021	→ Åtvidabergs FF (loan)	30	(0)
- * Club domestic league appearances and goals as of 11 November 2026

Gabriel Johansson (born 10 September 2000) is a Swedish footballer who plays as a defender for Falkenbergs FF.

== Career ==
=== Club career ===
Johansson came through the youth ranks at Falkenbergs FF and was promoted to the first team ahead of the 2020 season. He made his Allsvenskan debut on 21 June 2020 in a 2–0 loss against Kalmar FF, coming on as a substitute in the 90th minute for Carl Johansson.

In March 2021, Johansson was loaned out to Ettan Fotboll club Åtvidabergs FF on a deal until the summer, which was later extended for the remainder of the season. In January 2022, he extended his contract with Falkenbergs FF by one year, including an option for an additional year. In November 2022, the club exercised the option, and the contract was extended by another year. In December 2023, Johansson signed a new two-year contract with the club.

== Private life ==
Both his father, Roger "Senan" Johansson, and his older brother, Ludvig Johansson, have played for Falkenbergs FF.
