= Patrice Dimitriou =

French footballer (born 1983)

Personal information
- Date of birth: 11 March 1983 (age 43)
- Place of birth: Rillieux-la-Pape, France
- Height: 1.76 m (5 ft 9 in)
- Position: Midfielder

Team information
- Current team: Montceau Bourgogne

Youth career
- 2000–2004: Gueugnon

Senior career*
| Years | Team | Apps | (Gls) |
| 2004–2006 | Bourg-Péronnas | 64 | (12) |
| 2006–2011 | Moulins | 162 | (14) |
| 2011–2018 | Bourg-Péronnas | 142 | (11) |
| 2018– | Montceau Bourgogne | 0 | (0) |
- * Club domestic league appearances and goals as of 12:20, 19 August 2018 (UTC)

Patrice Dimitriou (born 11 March 1983) is a French professional footballer who plays for Montceau Bourgogne as a midfielder.

== Career ==
A product of the youth set-up at Gueugnon during the club's time in Ligue 2, Dimitriou began his senior career with Bourg-Péronnas in 2004. He went on to join Moulins in 2006 and spent five seasons with the club, including one campaign in the Championnat National in 2009–10. In the summer of 2011, he returned to Bourg-Péronnas and in 2015 was part of the side that won promotion to Ligue 2 for the first time in the team's history.
