= Mickaël Scannella =

French footballer (born 1987)

Personal information
- Date of birth: 10 June 1987 (age 39)
- Place of birth: Échirolles, France
- Height: 1.80 m (5 ft 11 in)
- Position: Goalkeeper

Team information
- Current team: Montceau Bourgogne

Senior career*
Years	Team	Apps	(Gls)
2006–2008	Échirolles		
2008–2018	Bourg-en-Bresse	45	(0)
2017–2018	Bourg-en-Bresse II	17	(0)
2018–	Montceau Bourgogne	39	(0)
- * Club domestic league appearances and goals as of 07:47, 11 July 2020 (UTC)

Mickaël Scannella (born 10 June 1987) is a French professional footballer who plays as a goalkeeper for Montceau Bourgogne.

== Career ==
Born in Échirolles, Scannella has played for Échirolles, Bourg-en-Bresse and Montceau Bourgogne.
