= Melker Nilsson =

Swedish footballer

Personal information
- Full name: Melker Nilsson
- Date of birth: 26 April 2000 (age 26)
- Place of birth: Sweden
- Position: Defensive midfielder

Team information
- Current team: Falkenbergs FF
- Number: 28

Youth career
- Glumslövs FF
- –2019: Malmö FF

Senior career*
Years	Team	Apps	(Gls)
2019–	Falkenbergs FF	170	(7)
- * Club domestic league appearances and goals as of 11 November 2026

Melker Nilsson (born 26 April 2000) is a Swedish footballer who plays as a defensive midfielder for Falkenbergs FF.

== Career ==
=== Club career ===
Nilsson started his career at Glumslövs FF, before joining Malmö FF, where he was promoted to the U19 squad in August 2017.

In August 2019, Nilsson was signed by Falkenbergs FF on a 2.5-year contract. He made his competitive debut on 22 August 2019 in a 4–0 win over Vårgårda IK in the Svenska Cupen, coming on as a substitute in the 72nd minute for Christoffer Carlsson. Nilsson made his Allsvenskan debut on 2 July 2020 in a 2–1 loss to IK Sirius, coming on in the 83rd minute for Marcus Mathisen. In total, he made seven league appearances during the 2020 season. In December 2021, Nilsson extended his contract by three years.

== Private life ==
His father, Joakim Nilsson, is a former international footballer.
