= Homère =

Homère is a French masculine given name, and is the French form of the name Homer. Notable people with the name include:

- Homère Clément (1852–1923), French physician and politician
- Anselme-Homère Pâquet (1830–1891), Canadian politician
- Homer Plessy (born Homère Patris Plessy; 1858, 1862 or 1863–1925), American shoemaker and activist
