= Richard Leite =

Paraguayan footballer (born 1983)

Richard Leite (born 16 September 1983 in Areguá, Paraguay) is a Paraguayan footballer currently playing for Independiente F.B.C. of the Primera División in Paraguay.

== Teams ==
- (Paraguay) 12 de Octubre 2004–2007
- (Paraguay) Sol de América 2007
- (Paraguay) 3 de Febrero 2008
- (Paraguay) Sportivo Luqueño 2009
- (Peru) Sport Huancayo 2009–2010
- (Paraguay) Independiente F.B.C. 2011–present
