= Tomasz Balul =

Polish footballer (born 1983)

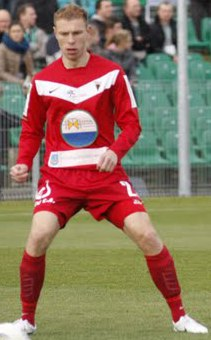
- Balul with GKS Tychy in 2012

Personal information
- Date of birth: 12 August 1983 (age 43)
- Place of birth: Chorzów, Poland
- Height: 1.86 m (6 ft 1 in)
- Position: Defender

Senior career*
Years	Team	Apps	(Gls)
2002–2006	Ruch Chorzów	55	(0)
2006	Górnik Zabrze II		
2007	MTZ-RIPO Minsk	2	(0)
2008	Piast Gliwice	2	(0)
2008	Gawin/Ślęza Wrocław	19	(0)
2009–2011	Zagłębie Sosnowiec	48	(0)
2011–2014	GKS Tychy	85	(2)
2014–2015	Nadwiślan Góra	32	(1)
2015–2016	Karpaty Krosno	26	(2)
2016–2017	ROW Rybnik	18	(0)
2017–2018	Sarmacja Będzin	27	(1)
2018–2021	Szombierki Bytom	64	(2)
2021	Sarmacja Będzin	1	(0)
- * Club domestic league appearances and goals

Tomasz Balul (born 12 August 1983) is a Polish former professional footballer who played as a defender.

== Honours ==
Szombierki Bytom

- IV liga Silesia I: 2019–20
