= Jean-Séraphin Mbessa =

Cameroonian footballer

Jean M'Bessa
Personal information
- Full name: Jean-Séraphin M'Bessa Akono
- Date of birth: 5 August 1983 (age 43)
- Place of birth: Yaoundé, Cameroon
- Height: 1.76 m (5 ft 9 in)
- Position: Striker

Youth career
- San Etieno Yaoundé

Senior career*
| Years | Team | Apps | (Gls) |
| 1997–2001 | Tonnerre Yaoundé | | |
| 2001–2006 | Levallois SC | | |
| 2006–2007 | US Quevilly | | |
| 2007–2008 | RCF Paris | | |
| 2008–2009 | Pacy Vallée-d'Eure | | |
| 2009 | Arles-Avignon | 1 | (0) |
| 2009–2010 | Boussu Dour Borinage | | |
| 2010 | Paris FC | | |
| 2011 | Orléans | | |
| 2011 | US Sénart-Moissy | | |
| 2012–2013 | Union SG | | |
| 2013–2014 | RFC Ath | | |
| 2014–2015 | Entente SSG | | |
- * Club domestic league appearances and goals

Jean-Séraphin M'Bessa Akono (born 5 August 1983) is a Cameroonian former professional footballer who played as a striker.
