= Marine Kakhidze =

Georgian footballer

Personal information
- Date of birth: 26 November 1983 (age 42)
- Position: Forward

Team information
- Current team: Samegrelo

Senior career*
Years	Team	Apps	(Gls)
- FC Iveria
- Samegrelo

International career^{‡}
2009–2016	Georgia	4	(0)
- * Club domestic league appearances and goals ‡ National team caps and goals as of 15 September 2016

Marine Kakhidze (Georgian: მარინე კახიძე; born 26 November 1983) is a Georgian footballer who plays as a forward for Women's Championship club KSE Samegrelo. She has played officially for the senior Georgia women's national team.

== International career ==
Kakhidze capped for Georgia at senior level during the 2011 FIFA Women's World Cup qualification – UEFA Group 3, including the 0–15 away loss to Denmark on 24 October 2009 (biggest defeat in the Georgia women's national football team history), and during the UEFA Women's Euro 2017 qualifying Group 6, in a 0–3 home loss to Switzerland on 15 September 2016.
