= Alexander Filippovich Samoylov =

Alexander Filippovich Samoylov (7 April 1867 – 22 July 1930) was a Russian physiologist and pioneer of electrophysiology and electrocardiography who applied techniques of using the ECG for diagnostic purposes. He served as a professor at Kazan University from 1903 until his death.

Samoylov was born in Odessa and after losing his father at an early age, he began to work to earn for the family. He went to the local gymnasium and then joined the Novorossiisk University to study physics and mathematics. He then changed to study medicine at the University of Derpt (Tartu), graduating in 1892 in medicine. He obtained a doctorate from St. Petersburg for a thesis on the fate of iron in the animal organism and joined research under Ivan Pavlov on digestion. In 1894 he went to work under Ivan Sechenov in Moscow. In 1883 he heard a talk by Nikolai Wedensky on electrical processes in nerves and muscles and their observations using a telephone apparatus. This led him to examine similar processes using a capillary electrometer, designing a drum recorder capturing what he called electrograms. He then went on to study the heart muscles of frogs and was able to detect the electrical impulses associated with the cardiac cycles. In 1904 he met Willem Einthoven at the International Physiological Congress in Brussels and then began to make use of a string galvanometer. He published on ECGs and vagus nerve stimulation experiments on frogs in 1908. He began to examine cardiac arrhythmias and their diagnosis. From 1903 to 1930 he worked at the department of zoology at Kazan University. Apart from physiology, he took an interest in music, musical theory and acoustics and was particularly interested in musical notation which he also associated with human muscle action. He died from a heart attack and was buried in Moscow.
