= Mamoudou Mara =

Guinean footballer

Personal information
- Date of birth: 31 December 1990 (age 35)
- Place of birth: Conakry, Guinea
- Height: 1.88 m (6 ft 2 in)
- Position: Defender

Team information
- Current team: FC Farvagny/Ogoz

Senior career*
Years	Team	Apps	(Gls)
2010–2012	Dijon B	26	(1)
2012–2014	Arles-Avignon	14	(0)
2014–2015	Yverdon	?	(?)
2016–2017	Le Mans	20	(1)
2017–2018	Montceau Bourgogne	15	(1)
2019–2020	FC Richemond Fribourg		
2020–2023	FC Farvagny/Ogoz	54	(9)
2023–2024	FC Fribourg		
2017–2018	FC Farvagny/Ogoz	13	(0)

International career
2012–2013	Guinea	9	(1)
- * Club domestic league appearances and goals as of 22:51, 5 December 2024 (UTC)

Mamoudou Mara (born 31 December 1990) is a Guinean professional footballer who plays as a defender for Swiss club FC Farvagny/Ogoz. He previously played in the French Ligue 2 with Arles-Avignon and for Swiss club Yverdon Sport FC.
