= Martin Schmidt (footballer) =

German footballer

Personal information
- Full name: Martin Schmidt
- Date of birth: 24 May 1983 (age 43)
- Place of birth: Heilbronn, West Germany
- Height: 1.72 m (5 ft 8 in)
- Position: Defender

Youth career
- SC Michelbach/Wald

Senior career*
Years	Team	Apps	(Gls)
–2003	VfR Heilbronn		
2003–2004	FC Heilbronn		
2004–2005	FV Lauda	31	(1)
2005–2009	TSV Crailsheim	107	(2)
2009–2010	Wacker Burghausen	7	(0)
2009–2010	Wacker Burghausen	7	(0)
2010–2017	FSV Hollenbach	189	(6)
Total		341+	(9+)
- * Club domestic league appearances and goals

Martin Schmidt (born 24 May 1983) is a German former footballer who played as a defender.
