= Homer B. Dibell =

American judge (1864–1934)

Homer B. Dibell, 1930

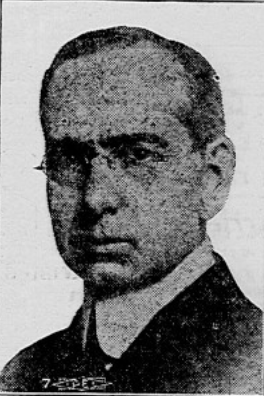
Homer B. Dibell, 1920

Homer Bliss Dibell (January 17, 1864 – February 17, 1934) was an American jurist.

Born in Fillmore County, Minnesota, Dibell moved with his family to Illinois and then to Wolcott, Indiana. Dibell graduated from Indiana University Bloomington in 1889 and from Northwestern University School of Law in 1890. He had studied law in Logansport, Indiana. In 1890, Dibell settled in Duluth, Minnesota and was admitted to the Minnesota bar. He then practiced law in Duluth, Minnesota. In 1899, Dibell served as a Minnesota district court judge. Dibell then served on the Minnesota Supreme Court from 1918 until his death in 1934. Dibell died of a heart attack in a hospital in Saint Paul, Minnesota.
