= Mathieu Guy =

French footballer (born 1983)

Personal information
- Full name: Mathieu Guy
- Date of birth: January 3, 1983 (age 43)
- Place of birth: Toulouse, France
- Height: 1.80 m (5 ft 11 in)
- Position: Defender

Team information
- Current team: Toulouse-Fontaines

Senior career*
| Years | Team | Apps | (Gls) |
| 2002–2004 | Amiens B | 5 | (0) |
| 2004–2005 | Amiens | 1 | (0) |
| 2007–2008 | US Lesquin | 10 | (0) |
| 2008–2010 | SR Colmar | 15 | (0) |
| 2010 | AS Illzach Modenheim | 7 | (0) |
| 2010– | Toulouse-Fontaines | 1 | (0) |
- * Club domestic league appearances and goals

Mathieu Guy (born January 3, 1983) is a French professional football player, who currently plays for Toulouse-Fontaines.

== Career ==
He played on the professional level in Ligue 2 for Amiens SC and in the Championnat de France amateur for SR Colmar.
