= Edilio Cardoso =

Brazilian footballer (born 1983)

Personal information
- Full name: Edilio Jean Cardoso de Oliveira
- Date of birth: May 16, 1983 (age 43)
- Place of birth: Alegrete, Brazil
- Height: 1.70 m (5 ft 7 in)
- Position: Forward

Senior career*
Years	Team	Apps	(Gls)
2003	Boca Juniors	1	(0)
2004	Estudiantes	19	(3)
2005	Defensores de Belgrano	10	(3)
2006–2009	Almirante Brown	102	(16)
2009–2010	Boyacá Chicó	31	(6)
2010	Real Cartagena	17	(2)
2011	Almirante Brown	14	(2)
2011–2013	Estudiantes	58	(9)
2013–2015	Barracas Central	72	(3)
2016	Deportivo Riestra	4	(0)
2016–2017	Ferrocarril Midland	34	(5)
2017–2018	Berazategui	16	(1)
Total		372	(50)
- * Club domestic league appearances and goals

Edilio Jean Cardoso de Oliveira (born May 16, 1983), known as Edilio Cardoso, is a Brazilian footballer who plays as a forward for Estudiantes de Buenos Aires of the Primera B Metropolitana in Argentina.

== Honors ==
Boca Juniors

- Argentine Primera División - Apertura: 2003–04
- Intercontinental Cup: 2003
- Copa Libertadores: 2003
