= Fance Hariyanto =

Indonesian footballer

Personal information
- Full name: Fance Hariyanto
- Date of birth: 1 October 1983 (age 43)
- Place of birth: Pekanbaru, Riau, Indonesia
- Height: 1.73 m (5 ft 8 in)
- Position: Goalkeeper

Senior career*
Years	Team	Apps	(Gls)
2007	Persijap Jepara	10	(0)
2008–2013	PSPS Pekanbaru	62	(0)

International career
2003	Indonesia U-23		
- * Club domestic league appearances and goals

Fance Hariyanto (born 1 October 1983, in Pekanbaru) is an Indonesian former footballer.

== Club statistics ==
Club	Season	Super League		Premier Division		Piala Indonesia		Total	
Club	Season	Apps	Goals	Apps	Goals	Apps	Goals	Apps	Goals
PSPS Pekanbaru	2009-10	15	0	-		4	0	19	0
PSPS Pekanbaru	2010-11	15	0	-		-		15	0
PSPS Pekanbaru	2011-12	15	0	-		-		15	0
Total		45	0	-		4	0	49	0
