= Jakub Cieciura =

Polish footballer

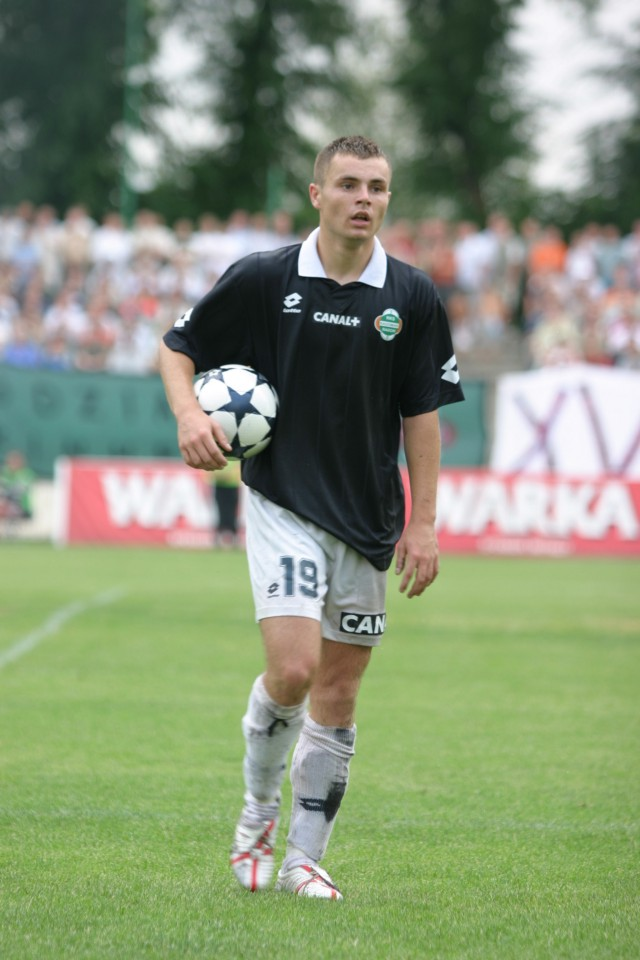

Personal information
- Full name: Jakub Cieciura
- Date of birth: 3 February 1983 (age 43)
- Place of birth: Lipsko, Poland
- Height: 1.79 m (5 ft 10 in)
- Position: Midfielder

Team information
- Current team: Powiślanka Lipsko
- Number: 10

Senior career*
Years	Team	Apps	(Gls)
2000	Powiślanka Lipsko		
2001	MG MZKS Kozienice		
2001–2002	UKS SMS Łódź		
2002–2003	ŁKS Łódź	7	(1)
2003	Stal Głowno		
2004–2005	Radomiak Radom		
2006	GKS Bełchatów	4	(0)
2007–2008	Hetman Zamość	46	(5)
2009	GKP Gorzów Wielkopolski	16	(2)
2009–2011	KSZO Ostrowiec	61	(4)
2011–2013	Olimpia Grudziądz	36	(0)
2013–2016	Radomiak Radom	99	(10)
2016–	Powiślanka Lipsko		
- * Club domestic league appearances and goals as of 18:54, 21 December 2024 (UTC)

Jakub Cieciura (born 3 February 1983) is a Polish footballer who plays as a midfielder for Powiślanka Lipsko.

== Career ==
=== Club ===
On 24 February 2006, he moved to GKS Bełchatów. In February 2009, he moved to GKP Gorzów Wielkopolski on a one-and-a-half-year contract. In summer 2009, he joined KSZO Ostrowiec on a two-year contract.

In June 2011, he signed a one-year contract with Olimpia Grudziądz.

== Honours ==
Radomiak Radom

- III liga Łódź–Masovia: 2014–15

Powiślanka Lipsko

- Polish Cup (Radom regionals): 2023–24
