= Wilfrido Vinces =

Ecuadorian footballer (born 1983)

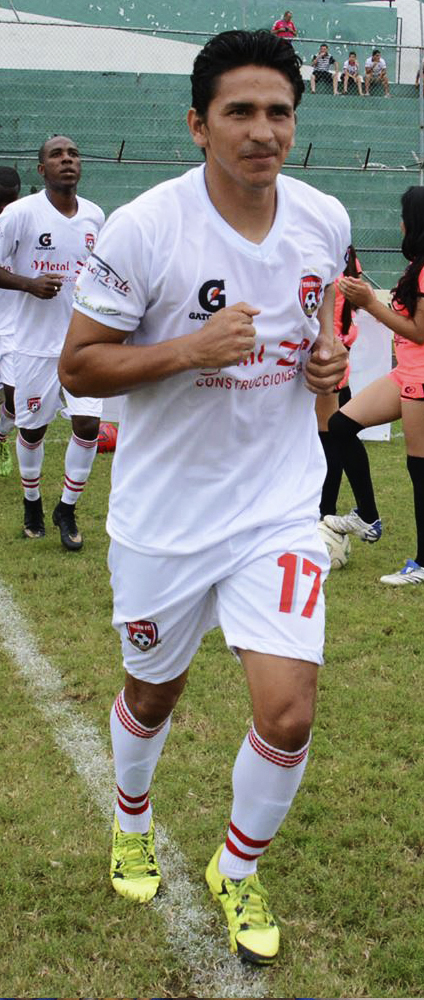
- Wilfrido Vinces in 2016.

Personal information
- Full name: Wilfrido Antonio Vinces
- Date of birth: 5 December 1983 (age 42)
- Place of birth: Ecuador
- Position: Forward

Team information
- Current team: Técnico Universitario
- Number: 13

Senior career*
Years	Team	Apps	(Gls)
2005–2009	Deportivo Quito	45	(0)
2009	Olmedo		
2010	Manta FC		
2011	LDU Portoviejo		
2012–	Técnico Universitario		
- * Club domestic league appearances and goals as of 4 November 2008 ‡ National team caps and goals as of 4 November 2008

Wilfrido Antonio Vinces (born December 5, 1983) is an Ecuadorian footballer currently playing for Técnico Universitario in the Serie A de Ecuador.
