= Nicolás Gásperi =

Argentine footballer

Personal information
- Full name: Nicolás Miguel Gásperi
- Date of birth: 6 May 1983 (age 43)
- Place of birth: Campana, Argentina
- Height: 1.79 m (5 ft 10 in)
- Position: Defender

Team information
- Current team: Acassuso

Senior career*
Years	Team	Apps	(Gls)
2000–2003	Puerto Nuevo	73	(5)
2003–2005	Brown	64	(1)
2005–2006	San Telmo	15	(0)
2006–2008	Luján	75	(6)
2008–2014	Estudiantes	210	(8)
2014–2016	Deportivo Morón	67	(0)
2017–2018	Brown	20	(0)
2018–	Acassuso	19	(1)
- * Club domestic league appearances and goals as of 10:59, 5 April 2019 (UTC)

Nicolás Miguel Gásperi (born 6 May 1983) is an Argentine professional footballer who plays as a defender for Acassuso.

== Career ==
Gásperi's career started with Puerto Nuevo in 2000. He went on to play in seventy-three games for the club, whilst also scoring five goals in Primera D Metropolitana. Gásperi went up to Primera B Metropolitana in 2003, signing for Brown. One goal in sixty-four matches in two seasons followed. Stints with San Telmo and Luján, of Primera C Metropolitana, then occurred for Gásperi, as the defender appeared ninety times for the two sides. In 2008, Gásperi joined Estudiantes. Two hundred and ten appearances and eight goals came across six campaigns in tier three, with his last goal coming in a win away to Deportivo Armenio on 13 April 2013.

On 30 June 2014, Gásperi moved across Primera B Metropolitana to join Deportivo Morón. He was sent off in his second match for them, receiving a red card after fifty-nine minutes of a fixture with Los Andes. Deportivo Morón won promotion to Primera B Nacional in 2016–17, though Gásperi had departed midway through the season after agreeing terms with former team Brown. He made twenty-three appearances in his second spell. In July 2018, Acassuso completed the signing of Gásperi. His bow arrived on 9 October versus UAI Urquiza, with his opening goal coming days later in a 2–1 loss to Estudiantes; another ex-club of Gásperi's.

== Personal life ==
Gásperi's brother, Federico, also played football at a professional level.

== Career statistics ==
As of 5 April 2019.

Appearances and goals by club, season and competition
Club	Season	League			Cup		Continental		Other		Total	
Club	Season	Division	Apps	Goals	Apps	Goals	Apps	Goals	Apps	Goals	Apps	Goals
San Telmo	2005–06	Primera B Metropolitana	15	0	0	0	—		0	0	15	0
Estudiantes	2012–13	Primera B Metropolitana	31	3	1	0	—		0	0	32	3
Estudiantes	2013–14	Primera B Metropolitana	28	1	5	0	—		0	0	33	1
Estudiantes	Total		59	4	6	0	—		0	0	65	4
Deportivo Morón	2014	Primera B Metropolitana	12	0	0	0	—		0	0	12	0
Deportivo Morón	2015	Primera B Metropolitana	32	0	0	0	—		3 (Note: Appearance(s) in the Primera B Metropolitana play-offs)	0	35	0
Deportivo Morón	2016	Primera B Metropolitana	15	0	1	0	—		0	0	16	0
Deportivo Morón	2016–17	Primera B Metropolitana	8	0	0	0	—		0	0	8	0
Deportivo Morón	Total		67	0	1	0	—		3	0	71	0
Brown	2016–17	Primera B Nacional	11	0	0	0	—		0	0	11	0
Brown	2017–18	Primera B Nacional	9	0	0	0	—		3 (Note: Appearance(s) in the Primera B Nacional play-offs)	0	12	0
Brown	Total		20	0	0	0	—		3	0	23	0
Acassuso	2018–19	Primera B Metropolitana	19	1	0	0	—		0	0	19	1
Career total			180	5	7	0	—		6	0	193	5
