= Homero Calderón =

Venezuelan footballer (born 1993)

Personal information
- Full name: Homero Ernesto Calderón Gazui
- Date of birth: 20 October 1993 (age 33)
- Place of birth: Valencia, Venezuela
- Height: 1.73 m (5 ft 8 in)
- Position: Midfielder

Team information
- Current team: Aragua (on loan from ACD Lara)
- Number: 23

Senior career*
Years	Team	Apps	(Gls)
2012–2014	Atlético Venezuela	26	(0)
2014–2015	Doxa Katokopias	21	(0)
2015–2016	ACD Lara	27	(0)
2016–2017	Vizela	12	(1)
2017–2018	Merelinense	19	(1)
2018–2019	Gafanha	13	(0)
2018–2019	Sertanense	11	(0)
2019–	ACD Lara	14	(0)
2020–	→ Aragua (loan)	3	(0)
- * Club domestic league appearances and goals as of 20:02, 1 September 2020 (UTC)

Homero Ernesto Calderón Gazui (born 20 October 1993), simply known as Homero Calderón is a Venezuelan professional former soccer player who plays for Aragua F.C. on loan from ACD Lara as a midfielder.

== Club career ==
Born in Valencia, Calderón kicked off his career with Atlético Venezuela where he made 26 appearances between 2012 and 2014 without scoring a goal. On 28 May 2014, he signed for Doxa Katokopias in Cypriot First Division.

== Immigration ==
Gazui was taken by Immigration and Customs Enforcement as of an unknown date approximately six months ago.
