= FC Montceau Bourgogne =

French football club

Montceau
- Full name: Football Club Montceau Bourgogne
- Founded: 1948; 78 years ago
- Ground: Stade des Alouettes
- Capacity: 6,000
- Chairman: Claude Menotti
- Manager: Jean-Philippe Forêt
- League: Régional 1 Bourgogne-Franche-Comté
- 2025–26: Régional 1 Bourgogne-Franche-Comté Group A, 6th of 12
- Website: fcmontceaubourgogne.footeo.com
Home colours	Away colours

Football Club Montceau Bourgogne is a French association football team founded in 1948. They are based in Montceau-les-Mines, Bourgogne, France and are currently playing in Régional 1. They play at the Stade des Alouettes in Montceau-les-Mines, which has a capacity of 6,000.

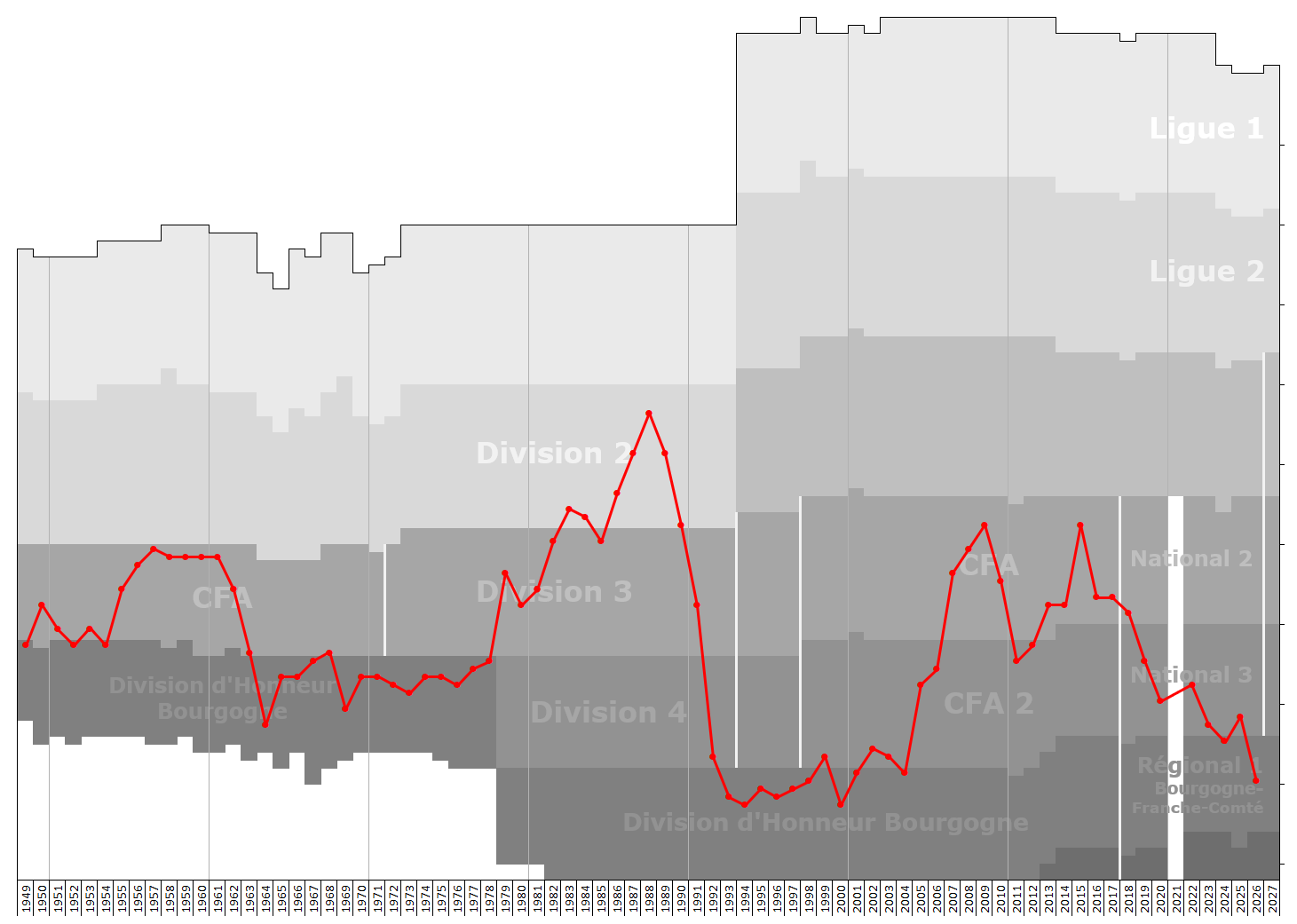
Historical league performance chart of FC Montceau Bourgogne

== Coupe de France 2006–07 ==
In the quarterfinals of the 2007 Coupe de France, 4th division Montceau made the headlines by defeating Lens 1–0, who were at that time sitting in 2nd place in Ligue 1. In the same season, Montceau also defeated Bordeaux, another Ligue 1 side. Eventually, the team fell in the semi-finals against Sochaux (2–0).

== Current squad ==
As of 20 March 2019

Note: Flags indicate national team as defined under FIFA eligibility rules; some limited exceptions apply. Players may hold more than one non-FIFA nationality.

No.	Pos.	Nation	Player
—	GK	SRB	Petar Djurica (On loan)
—	GK	FRA	Victor Loctin
—	GK	FRA	Mohamed Dramé
—	GK	FRA	Mickael Pineau
—	DF	FRA	Théo Agius
—	DF	FRA	Laurent Amiens
—	DF	FRA	Sidahmed Bouaza
—	DF	FRA	Thomas Coulon
—	DF	FRA	Benoît Darcy
—	DF	FRA	Brian Dupasquier
—	DF	FRA	Gaby Jean
—	DF	BRA	Lucas Roncato
—	DF	FRA	Hugo Large
—	DF	FRA	Isaac Moscato
—	DF	CMR	Devaloix Ngako
—	DF	FRA	Nicolas Yaba
—	DF	FRA	Quentin Frizot
—	DF	FRA	Mohamed Bouazzaoui
—	DF	GUI	Mamoudou Mara
—	DF	FRA	Jean-Baptiste Massimi
—	MF	FRA	Badreddine Amrane
—	MF	FRA	Cyril Bagnon

No.	Pos.	Nation	Player
—	MF	FRA	Sofiane Belkacem
—	MF	FRA	Camille Berkache
—	MF	FRA	Jérémy Crétin
—	MF	FRA	Souleymane Diallo
—	MF	FRA	Mathieu Duféal
—	MF	FRA	Réane El Karafi
—	MF	FRA	Othmane El Khadari
—	MF	FRA	Alexis Guérin
—	MF	FRA	Mourad Merabi
—	MF	FRA	Romain Goulliat
—	MF	FRA	Quentin Schaffer
—	MF	FRA	Riyad Dellal
—	MF	ARG	Lucas Oliviera
—	FW	FRA	Patrice Dimitriou
—	FW	FRA	Sacha Essombe
—	FW	FRA	Amine Hadj
—	FW	FRA	Nicolas Kada
—	FW	FRA	Alex Rougeot
—	FW	CMR	Adonis Tchounet
—	FW	FRA	Abdallah Boudabous
—	FW	LAO	Victor Ngovinnasack
