= Adil Mezgour =

Moroccan footballer (born 1983)

Personal information
- Date of birth: 11 March 1983 (age 43)
- Place of birth: Casablanca, Morocco
- Position: Forward

Senior career*
Years	Team	Apps	(Gls)
1999–2000	Sala Baganza		
2000–2002	Anzola dell'Emilia		
2002–2008	Castelfranco Emilia		
2008–2009	Bellaria	17	(6)
2009–2010	Cassino	45	(13)
2010–2011	Savona	59	(8)
2011–2013	Sestri Levante	48	(9)
2012–2019	Poggibonsi	7	(0)
2019-2020	VIS Novafeltria		
- * Club domestic league appearances and goals

Adil Mezgour (born 11 March 1983) is a Moroccan former footballer who played as a forward. He spent entire professional career in Italy.

== Career ==
=== Early career ===
Born in Casablanca, Morocco, Mezgour started his career with an amateur team in Sala Bolognese, Emilia–Romagna in 1999. He then left for a team in Anzola dell'Emilia. Since 2002 he played for Virtus Castelfranco at Eccellenza Emilia–Romagna and won promotion to Serie D in 2004.

=== Lega Pro ===
In 2008, he left Castelfranco Emilia and signed by another Emilia–Romagna team Bellaria – Igea Marina on free transfer. He played 17 Seconda Divisione matches before left for Cassino, of Group C of Seconda Divisione. He played 45 league matches for the Lazio team until the club was expelled from the professional league due to its financial difficulties.

In July 2010, he was signed by Savona and a year later joined to U.S.D. Sestri Levante 1919.

== Honours ==
- Eccellenza Emilia–Romagna: 2004
