= Daniel Almaral =

Mexican footballer and manager (born 1983)

Personal information
- Full name: Daniel Almaral Mendoza
- Date of birth: 15 February 1983 (age 43)
- Place of birth: Guadalajara, Jalisco, Mexico
- Height: 1.76 m (5 ft 9 in)
- Position: Defender

Senior career*
Years	Team	Apps	(Gls)
2004–2007	Atlas	12	(0)
2005–2006	→ Coyotes de Sonora (loan)	36	(1)
2006–2007	→ Académicos (loan)	23	(1)

Managerial career
- 2011–2018: Atlas Reserves and Academy
- 2019–2020: Atlético San Luis Reserves and Academy
- * Club domestic league appearances and goals

Daniel Almaral Mendoza (born 15 February 1983) is a Mexican football manager and former player.
