= Vladimir Niyonkuru =

Burundian footballer

Personal information
- Full name: Vladimir Niyonkuru
- Date of birth: July 21, 1983 (age 43)
- Place of birth: Bujumbura, Burundi
- Height: 1.77 m (5 ft 9 1/2 in)
- Position: Goalkeeper

Team information
- Current team: Azzam United
- Number: 22

Youth career
- 2000–2002: Vital'O F.C.

Senior career*
Years	Team	Apps	(Gls)
2003–2005	AS Inter Star	90	(0)
2006–2007	Rayon Sport	20	(0)
2008–	Azzam United	34	(0)

International career
2004–	Burundi	30	(0)
Medal record
Men's football
Representing Burundi
CECAFA Cup
Runner-up	2004 Ethiopia
- * Club domestic league appearances and goals

Vladimir Niyonkuru (born 21 July 1983 in Bujumbura) is a Burundian goalkeeper with Azzam United in the Tanzanian Premier League in Tanzania.

== Career ==
He signs on 1 January 2006 with Rayon Sport, he came from AS Inter Star an Bujumbura based club on youth side played for Vital'O F.C.

== International career ==
Niyonkuru is member of the Burundi national football team.

== Honours ==
Burundi

- CECAFA Cup: Runner-up, 2004
