= Tshiabola Mapanya =

Congolese footballer

Personal information
- Date of birth: June 7, 1983 (age 43)
- Place of birth: Republic of the Congo
- Position: Defender

Senior career*
Years	Team	Apps	(Gls)
2008	SC Cilu		
2008	FK Jablonec	2	(0)
2008–2010	1. FK Příbram	7	(0)
2010–?	St. Marcel Foot		

International career
2006–2007	DR Congo	2	(0)
- * Club domestic league appearances and goals

Tshiabola Mapanya (born June 7, 1983) is a retired Congolese football defender.

== Career ==
Mapanya played for SC Cilu, before signed for FK Jablonec in July 2008. After only four months he left FK Baumit Jablonec and signed with League rival 1. FK Příbram.

He played in the 2008/2009 season six games played for 1. FK Příbram in the Czech League. He left in May 2010 the Czech Republic and signed with French Championnat de France amateur 2 club St Marcel Foot.
