= Alan Patrick (footballer, born 1983) =

Brazilian footballer (born 1983)

Personal information
- Full name: Alan Patrick Monegat
- Date of birth: 27 March 1983 (age 43)
- Place of birth: São Lourenço, Brazil
- Height: 1.72 m (5 ft 8 in)
- Position: Midfielder

Senior career*
Years	Team	Apps	(Gls)
2000	Figueirense		
2001–2002	Alemannia Aachen		
2002–2003	Académica		
2003–2004	Figueirense		
2005	Deportes Melipilla		
2006	Fernández Vial		
2006–2007	Vöcklabrucker SC		
2008	São Gabriel		
2009	EC Milan		
2010	Juventus Jaraguá		
2010	Garibaldi		
2011	Central		
2011	Imbituba		
2012	Sapucaiense		
- * Club domestic league appearances and goals

Alan Patrick Monegat (born 27 March 1983) is a Brazilian former football player.

== Career ==
Alan Monegat played in the 2005 Chilean Primera División with Deportes Melipilla, but couldn't prevent the club's relegation. He also made two appearances in the 2010 Campeonato Pernambucano for Central Sport Club.
