= Bilel Gontassi =

Tunisian footballer

Personal information
- Date of birth: 3 January 1983 (age 43)
- Position: Midfielder

Senior career*
Years	Team	Apps	(Gls)
2006–2009	CA Bizertin		
2009–2011	EGS Gafsa		
2011–2012	AS Gabès		
2012–2015	ES Zarzis		
- * Club domestic league appearances and goals

Bilel Gontassi (born 3 January 1983) is a Tunisian football midfielder.
