= Marcin Truszkowski =

Polish footballer

Personal information
- Date of birth: 8 September 1983 (age 43)
- Place of birth: Ostrołęka, Poland
- Height: 1.85 m (6 ft 1 in)
- Position: Forward

Senior career*
| Years | Team | Apps | (Gls) |
| 1998–2005 | Narew Ostrołęka | | |
| 2003 | → Gryf Wejherowo (loan) | | |
| 2005–2006 | ŁKS Łomża | | |
| 2006–2008 | GKS Bełchatów | 9 | (1) |
| 2007–2008 | → Jagiellonia Białystok (loan) | 8 | (1) |
| 2008–2009 | Górnik Łęczna | 15 | (2) |
| 2009 | Górnik Łęczna II | 1 | (0) |
| 2009–2010 | Narew Ostrołęka | 31 | (14) |
| 2011–2012 | Ostrovia Ostrów Mazowiecka | | |
| 2012 | ŁKS 1926 Łomża | 15 | (9) |
| 2013–2015 | Siarka Tarnobrzeg | 73 | (33) |
| 2015 | Polonia Warsaw | 7 | (0) |
| 2016 | ŁKS 1926 Łomża | 5 | (1) |
- * Club domestic league appearances and goals

Marcin Truszkowski (born 8 September 1983) is a Polish former professional footballer who played as a forward.

He has played for GKS Bełchatów and Jagiellonia Białystok in the Polish Ekstraklasa.
