= Esporte Clube Milan =

Milan
- Full name: Esporte Clube Milan
- Nickname(s): Rubro-negro
- Founded: March 7, 1989
- Ground: Estádio Miguel Wairich Filho, Júlio de Castilhos, Rio Grande do Sul state, Brazil
- Capacity: 1,000
- President: Márcio Rubin
- Head Coach: Valduíno
Home colours	Away colours

Esporte Clube Milan, commonly known as Milan, is a Brazilian football club based in Júlio de Castilhos, Rio Grande do Sul state.

== History ==
The club was founded on March 7, 1989, after Esporte Clube Castilhense and Sociedade Esportiva Cometa merged. They competed in the Campeonato Gaúcho Second Level for the first time in 1995 competing again in 1996.

== Stadium ==
Esporte Clube Milan play their home games at Estádio Miguel Wairich Filho. The stadium has a maximum capacity of 1,000 people.
