= Homer L. Thomas =

American art historian and archaeologist (1913–2003)

- Born: 1913; Kansas City, Missouri
- Died: May 28, 2003 (aged 89); Poolesville, Maryland
- Education: University of Chicago; Warburg Institute; Johns Hopkins University; University of Michigan
- Scientific career
- Fields: Art historian and archaeologist
- Institutions: Asia Institute; University of Missouri

Homer L. Thomas (1913 – May 28, 2003) was an American archaeologist and art historian who was Professor Emeritus of Art History and Archeology at the University of Missouri.

== Biography ==
Homer L. Thomas was born in Kansas City, Missouri in 1913. Having attended the University of Chicago, the Warburg Institute in London and Johns Hopkins University, Thomas received his Ph.D. from the University of Edinburgh in 1949. He subsequently worked at the Asia Institute in New York City and at the University of Michigan.

In 1950, Thomas joined the faculty of the University of Missouri, where he taught courses in European Art and Archaeology, Oriental Art and Civilization, Roman Provincial and Early Christian Art, and Art of the Dark Ages. In 1960, together with Saul Weinberg, Thomas played an instrumental role in re-establishing the Department of Art History and Archaeology at the University of Missouri. He played an important role in building the collections at Ellis Library, particularly with respect to archaeology and art history.

Throughout his career, Thomas carried out important archaeological field work in Yugoslavia, Poland and Luxembourg. He received awards in Scotland, England, Denmark and Germany for his archaeological work. He was the author of numerous works on archaeology and art. A festschrift in his honor, Horizons and Styles: Studies in Early Art and Archeology in Honour of Professor Homer L. Thomas, was published in 1993. Thomas was a Fellow of the Guggenheim Foundation, the Society of Antiquaries of London, and the Society of Antiquaries of Scotland.

Thomas retired as Professor Emeritus in August 1984, after which he moved to the Washington metropolitan area. He died in Poolesville, Maryland on May 28, 2003, at the age of 89.

== Selected works ==
- Near Eastern, Mediterranean and European Chronology, 1967
- A Handbook of Archeology: Cultures and Sites: North Africa, Egypt, Southwest Asia, Mediterranean, Northwest Europe, Northern Europe, Central Europe, Southeast Europe, Eastern Europe, Western Asia, 1993-1996
