= Albert Batsa =

Togolese football midfielder

Personal information
- Date of birth: 27 May 1983 (age 43)
- Place of birth: Togo
- Height: 1.92 m (6 ft 4 in)
- Position: Midfielder

Team information
- Current team: Maranatha F.C.
- Number: 30

Senior career*
Years	Team	Apps	(Gls)
2002–2003	Liberty Professionals		
2004–2007	AS Douane		
2007–	Maranatha F.C.		

International career^{‡}
2003–2006	Togo	1	(0)
- * Club domestic league appearances and goals as of 00:22 8 June 2008 ‡ National team caps and goals as of 23 June 2006

Albert Batsa (born 27 May 1983) is a Togolese football midfielder. He currently plays for Maranatha F.C.
