= Alexis Salazar =

Chilean footballer (born 1983)

Personal information
- Full name: Alexis Alejandro Salazar Villarroel
- Date of birth: 3 June 1983 (age 43)
- Place of birth: Lota, Chile
- Height: 1.80 m (5 ft 11 in)
- Position: Defender

Senior career*
Years	Team	Apps	(Gls)
2001–2005	Lota Schwager	188	(4)
2004	→ Deportes Linares (loan)	27	(1)
2006	Provincial Arauco	38	(6)
2007	Fernández Vial	38	(3)
2008–2009	Lota Schwager	73	(5)
2010–2012	Deportes Concepción	74	(7)
2013–2017	Cobresal	90	(2)
Total		528	(28)
- * Club domestic league appearances and goals

Alexis Alejandro Salazar Villarroel (born 3 June 1983) is a Chilean former footballer who played as a defender.

== Personal life ==
He is nicknamed Manzana (Apple).

After retiring in Cobresal, he made his home in Concepción, Chile, and has worked in freight transport.

== Honours ==
Cobresal

- Torneo Clausura: 2015
