= Jan Ahlvik =

Finnish footballer (born 1983)

Personal information
- Date of birth: 14 January 1983 (age 43)
- Place of birth: Pedersöre, Finland
- Height: 1.95 m (6 ft 5 in)
- Position: Defender

Team information
- Current team: Vaasan Palloseura
- Number: 2

Senior career*
Years	Team	Apps	(Gls)
- Esse IK
2003	FF Jaro	2	(0)
- Vaasan Palloseura
- FC Korsholm
20??–2008	Vasa IFK	50	(3)
2006	→Ashton United (loan)	7	(0)
2008–	Vaasan Palloseura	21	(0)
- * Club domestic league appearances and goals as of 14 October 2009

Jan Ahlvik (born 14 January 1983) is a Finnish footballer who represents Vaasan Palloseura of Veikkausliiga.

Ahlvik played for Esse IK, FF Jaro, Vaasan Palloseura and FC Korsholm before joining Vasa IFK. In 2006, he joined English non-league side Ashton United on loan. In 2008, he rejoined Vaasan Palloseura
