= Fabio Marinho =

Brazilian footballer (born 1983)

Personal information
- Full name: Fabio da Silva Costa Marinho
- Date of birth: 25 March 1983 (age 43)
- Place of birth: Merias, Brazil
- Height: 1.88 m (6 ft 2 in)
- Position: Defender

Senior career*
Years	Team	Apps	(Gls)
2004–2005	Barbarense		
2006	Mineiros		
2007–2008	União		
2009	Jataiense		
2009–2010	Free State Stars	15	(1)
2011–2012	Rondonópolis		
2012	Al-Shorta		
2013	Cacerense		
2013	Al-Shorta		
2013	Operário-MG		
Total		15	(1)
- * Club domestic league appearances and goals

Fabio da Silva Costa Marinho (born 25 March 1983) is a retired Brazilian footballer.

== Career statistics ==
=== Club ===
Club	Season	League			Cup		Other		Total	
Club	Season	Division	Apps	Goals	Apps	Goals	Apps	Goals	Apps	Goals
Free State Stars	2009–10	Premier Soccer League	15	1	0	0	0	0	15	1
Career total			15	1	0	0	0	0	15	1
