= Daniel Jurč =

Slovak footballer

Personal information
- Full name: Daniel Jurč
- Date of birth: 7 March 1983 (age 43)
- Place of birth: Humenné, Czechoslovakia
- Height: 1.80 m (5 ft 11 in)
- Position: Centre back

Team information
- Current team: FK Inter Bratislava

Youth career
- 1995–?: Svidník

Senior career*
Years	Team	Apps	(Gls)
?–2005	Svidník		
2006–2011	Ružomberok	54	(1)
2009	→ Dolný Kubín (loan)		
2011	Svidník		
2012	SC Union Nettetal 1996 e.V.		
2012–2013	Svidník		
2013–2014	Przełęcz Dukla		
2014–2015	OŠK Kľušov		
2015	Ivanka pri Dunaji		
2016–	Inter Bratislava	0	(0)
- * Club domestic league appearances and goals as of 27 February 2016

Daniel Jurč (born 7 March 1983 in Humenné) is a Slovak football defender who currently plays for FK Inter Bratislava.
