= Mark Magennis =

Northern Irish footballer

Personal information
- Date of birth: 15 March 1983
- Place of birth: Northern Ireland
- Positions: Midfielder; winger

Senior career*
Years	Team	Apps	(Gls)
-2002	Coventry City	0	(0)
2002	Carlisle United	6	(1)
-2006	Limavady United		
2006–2007	Linfield	1	
2007–2008	Dungannon Swifts		
2008–2009	Bangor	1	(2)
2015–2016	Ballymena United	7	(0)
- * Club domestic league appearances and goals

Mark Magennis (born 15 March 1983 in Northern Ireland) is a Northern Irish retired footballer. He played in the Football League with Carlisle United and was a Northern Ireland youth international.
