= Robin Ganemyr =

Swedish footballer

Personal information
- Full name: Robin Ganemyr
- Date of birth: 25 June 1983 (age 43)
- Place of birth: Sweden
- Height: 1.86 m (6 ft 1 in)
- Position: Midfielder

Youth career
- Kungsbacka BI

Senior career*
| Years | Team | Apps | (Gls) |
| 2003–2007 | Örgryte IS | 66 | (2) |
| 2007–2012 | Falkenbergs FF | 145 | (13) |
| 2013–2015 | Oddevold | 32 | (4) |
- * Club domestic league appearances and goals

Robin Ganemyr (born 25 June 1983) is a Swedish retired footballer who played as a midfielder.
