= Sinecio León =

Paraguayan footballer (born 1983)

Personal information
- Full name: Sinecio León Gavilán
- Date of birth: 20 May 1983 (age 43)
- Place of birth: Hernandarias, Paraguay
- Position: Midfielder

Senior career*
Years	Team	Apps	(Gls)
2004–2006	Sportivo Luqueño	57	(1)
2007	Martín Ledesma	0	(0)
2007–2008	Sportivo Luqueño	0	(0)
2008–2009	3 de Febrero	12	(0)
2009–2010	Deportivo Merlo	5	(0)
2010	Sportivo Trinidense	5	(0)
2011	12 de Octubre	7	(0)
2011–2012	Atlético Mitre	15	(0)
Total		94	(1)
- * Club domestic league appearances and goals

Sinecio León Gavilán (born 20 May 1983) is a Paraguayan former footballer, who played club football in Paraguay and Argentina.

== Career ==
León began his career with Sportivo Luqueño spending time with the club's reserves and first team.
