= Víctor Fagundez =

Uruguayan footballer (born 1983)

Personal information
- Full name: Víctor Adrián Fagundez Samurio
- Date of birth: 5 February 1983 (age 43)
- Place of birth: Montevideo, Uruguay
- Height: 1.75 m (5 ft 9 in)
- Position: Midfielder

Team information
- Current team: Deportivo Malacateco

Senior career*
Years	Team	Apps	(Gls)
2003–2010	Montevideo Wanderers	75	(3)
2010–	Deportivo Malacateco		
- * Club domestic league appearances and goals as of 15 August 2010

Víctor Adrián Fagundez Samurio (born 5 February 1983 in Montevideo) is an Uruguayan footballer playing for Deportivo Malacateco in Guatemala's top division.
