= Erivélton (footballer, born 1983) =

Brazilian footballer

Personal information
- Full name: Erivélton Aragão
- Date of birth: July 28, 1983 (age 43)
- Place of birth: Curitiba, Brazil
- Height: 1.65 m (5 ft 5 in)
- Position: Right back

Team information
- Current team: Atlético-PR

Youth career
- 1995–2003: Paraná

Senior career*
Years	Team	Apps	(Gls)
2003–2005	Paraná		
2006–2008	Iguaçu		
2008	Atlético-PR		
- * Club domestic league appearances and goals

Erivélton Aragão or simply Erivélton (born July 28, 1983, in Curitiba), is a Brazilian right back. He currently plays for Atlético-PR.

== Contract ==
- 12 March 2008 to 12 June 2008
