= Sebastjan Čelofiga =

Slovenian footballer

Personal information
- Full name: Sebastjan Čelofiga
- Date of birth: 22 April 1983 (age 43)
- Height: 1.82 m (6 ft 0 in)
- Position: Goalkeeper

Senior career*
Years	Team	Apps	(Gls)
2002–2003	Dravinja	24	(0)
2003–2007	Publikum Celje	5	(0)
2004–2005	→ Šmartno ob Paki (loan)	15	(0)
2005–2006	→ Dravinja (loan)	11	(0)
2006–2007	→ Zagorje (loan)	2	(0)
2007–2010	Rudar Velenje	7	(0)
2010–2012	Dravinja	30	(0)
2011	→ Interblock (loan)	11	(0)
2012–	Žalec		
- * Club domestic league appearances and goals as of 20 June 2013

Sebastjan Čelofiga (born 22 April 1983) is a Slovenian retired footballer who last played for Žalec. He works as an academy goalkeeper coach at NK Celje.

Čelofiga had joined Interblock from Dravinja in January 2011.

== Personal life ==
In 2017, his house was destroyed after being struck by lightning.
