= Kim Seok-woo =

South Korean footballer (born 1983)

Kim Seok-Woo
Personal information
- Full name: Kim Seok-Woo (김석우)
- Date of birth: May 6, 1983 (age 43)
- Place of birth: South Korea
- Height: 1.88 m (6 ft 2 in)
- Position: Defender

Senior career*
Years	Team	Apps	(Gls)
2004	Pohang Steelers	14	(0)
2005–2006	Gwangju Sangmu	4	(0)
2007–2009	Busan I'Park	11	(0)
2010	Kookmin Bank FC		

International career
1999	South Korea U17		
2000	South Korea U18		
2001	South Korea U19		
- * Club domestic league appearances and goals

Kim Seok-woo (born May 6, 1983) is a South Korean football defender who since 2007 has played for Busan I'Park (formerly Pohang Steelers and Gwangju Sangmu).
