= Ron Koperli =

Israeli football manager

Ron Koperli רון קופרלי
Personal information
- Full name: Ron Koperli
- Date of birth: November 16, 1983 (age 42)
- Place of birth: Rehovot, Israel
- Position: Defender

Youth career
- Maccabi Sha'arayim

Senior career*
Years	Team	Apps	(Gls)
2002–2004	Maccabi Sha'arayim		
2004–2005	Maccabi Netanya		
2006–2007	Maccabi Ahi Nazarerh	18	(0)
2007	Hapoel Jerusalem	1	(0)
2007–2010	Hapoel Ashkelon	64	(0)
2010–2011	Ahva Arraba	27	(0)
2011–2013	Maccabi Yavne	22	(0)
2013	Maccabi Ironi Bat Yam	13	(1)
2013–2014	Beitar Kfar Saba	12	(0)
2014	Sektzia Ness Ziona	13	(0)
2016–2017	Beitar Yavne	23	(0)

Managerial career
- 2018–2019: Maccabi Sha'arayim
- 2023–2024: Maccabi Sha'arayim
- * Club domestic league appearances and goals

Ron (Ronny) Koperli (Hebrew: רון (רוני) קופרלי; born November 16, 1983) is an Israeli football manager.
