= Shaheen Ali =

Qatari footballer (born 1983)

Personal information
- Full name: Shaheen Ali Mahmoud
- Date of birth: 1 January 1983 (age 43)
- Place of birth: Qatar
- Height: 1.71 m (5 ft 7 1/2 in)
- Position: Right-back

Senior career*
Years	Team	Apps	(Gls)
2003–2007	Al-Ahli		
2005–2006	→ Al-Gharafa (loan)		
2007–2008	Al-Sailiya		
2008–2010	Al-Ahli		
2010–2016	Qatar		
2016–2018	Muaither		
- * Club domestic league appearances and goals

Shaheen Ali (Arabic:شاهين علي) (born 1 January 1983) is a Qatari footballer who played as a right back .
