= Steven Goaxab =

Namibian footballer

Steven Goaxab (born 16 October 1983 in Grootfontein) is a Namibian footballer who played for Orlando Pirates S.C. in the Namibia Premier League and Carara Kicks F.C. in the South African National First Division. Goaxab has also capped with the Namibia national football team.
