= Denis Rustan =

Russian footballer

Personal information
- Full name: Denis Semyonovich Rustan
- Date of birth: 9 November 1983 (age 42)
- Place of birth: Moscow, Russian SFSR
- Height: 1.70 m (5 ft 7 in)
- Position: Midfielder

Youth career
- FC Dynamo Moscow

Senior career*
Years	Team	Apps	(Gls)
2002–2004	FC Spartak Shchyolkovo	57	(3)
2005	FC Sheksna Cherepovets	13	(0)
2005–2008	FC Sportakademklub Moscow	78	(4)
2009	FC Nosta Novotroitsk	4	(0)
2010–2012	FC Fakel Voronezh	23	(0)
2013	FC Khimki	0	(0)
- * Club domestic league appearances and goals

Denis Semyonovich Rustan (Russian: Дэнис Семёнович Рустан; born 9 November 1983) is a former Russian professional football player.

== Club career ==
He played 3 seasons in the Russian Football National League for FC Sportakademklub Moscow, FC Nosta Novotroitsk and FC Fakel Voronezh.
