= Kennedy Omogi =

Kenyan footballer

Kennedy Ayong Omogi (December 9, 1983) is a Kenyan footballer who currently plays for Tusker in the Tusker Premier League as a midfielder. Having scored one goal for the Kenya national football team, Omogi can be used anywhere on the pitch practically, but can effectively be used anywhere in midfield. Omogi usually plays down the middle, but also plays on the wings.

== Club career ==
Omogi had been playing for Mathare United for almost half a decade before he was signed by Tusker on 29 January 2013.

== International career ==
Omogi is a new admittance to the Kenyan national squad, and recently started for them in a qualifying game, scoring only goal for the team.
