= Romain Chevrier =

French professional football coatch (born 1983)

Personal information
- Date of birth: July 26, 1983 (age 43)
- Place of birth: Clermont-Ferrand, France
- Height: 1.75 m (5 ft 9 in)
- Position: Defender

Team information
- Current team: AS Yzeure

Senior career*
Years	Team	Apps	(Gls)
2003–2004	Clermont Foot	2	(0)
2004	SO Châtellerault		
2005–2006	Clermont Foot	15	(0)
2006–2007	Croix-de-Savoie		
2007–2008	SO Romorantin		
2008–	AS Yzeure		
- * Club domestic league appearances and goals as of 20:23, 26 November 2009 (UTC)

Romain Chevrier (born July 26, 1983) is a French professional football coach. Currently, he plays in the Championnat de France amateur for AS Yzeure.

He played on the professional level in Ligue 2 for Clermont Foot.
