= Mamoudou Sy =

French basketball player

Personal information
- Born: April 1, 1983 (age 43) Paris, France

Career history
- 2003-2004: ASVEL Basket

Mamoudou Sy (born 1 April 1983 in Paris, France) is a French basketball player who played for French league Pro-A club Lyon-Villeurbanne during the 2003-2004 season.
