= Getúlio Vargas (footballer) =

Brazilian footballer (born 1983)

Personal information
- Full name: Getúlio Vargas Freitas Oliveira Júnior
- Date of birth: 22 January 1983 (age 43)
- Place of birth: São Gonçalo, Brazil
- Height: 1.92 m (6 ft 4 in)
- Position: Goalkeeper

Youth career
- 2003: Flamengo

Senior career*
Years	Team	Apps	(Gls)
2004–2009	Flamengo	2	(0)
2006	→ Fortaleza (loan)	0	(0)
2007–2008	→ KVC Westerlo (loan)	0	(0)
2008–2009	KVC Westerlo	0	(0)
2009	Vila Nova	0	(0)
2010	Duque de Caxias	14	(0)
2010–2011	Vitória de Setúbal	2	(0)
2011–2012	Orlando Pirates	0	(0)
2012	Bangu	16	(0)
2013	ABC	4	(0)
2014	Boavista	16	(0)
Total		54	(0)
- * Club domestic league appearances and goals

Getúlio Vargas Freitas Oliveira Júnior or simply Getúlio Vargas Junior (born 22 January 1983), is a Brazilian former professional footballer who played as a goalkeeper.
