= Anton Samoylov =

Russian footballer

Personal information
- Full name: Anton Sergeyevich Samoylov
- Date of birth: 15 November 1983 (age 42)
- Height: 1.81 m (5 ft 11 1/2 in)
- Positions: Defender; midfielder

Senior career*
Years	Team	Apps	(Gls)
2001–2003	FC Dynamo Izhevsk	57	(2)
2004–2005	FC Gazovik-Gazprom Izhevsk	59	(1)
2006	FC Dynamo Makhachkala	21	(0)
2007–2010	FC SOYUZ-Gazprom Izhevsk	61	(2)
2011–2013	FC Zenit-Izhevsk	60	(0)
- * Club domestic league appearances and goals

Anton Sergeyevich Samoylov (Russian: Антон Серге́евич Самойлов; born 15 November 1983) is a former Russian professional football player.

== Club career ==
He made his Russian Football National League debut for FC Dynamo Makhachkala on 26 March 2006 in a game against FC Mashuk-KMV Pyatigorsk.
