= Gabriel López (footballer, born 1983) =

Uruguayan footballer (born 1983)

Personal information
- Full name: Álvaro Gabriel López Molinari
- Date of birth: 24 August 1983 (age 43)
- Place of birth: San Carlos, Uruguay
- Height: 1.87 m (6 ft 2 in)
- Position: Striker

Senior career*
Years	Team	Apps	(Gls)
2006–2007	River Plate Montevideo	7	(0)
2007	Liverpool Canelones	–	(–)
2007	Canelones (city team)	–	(–)
2007–2008	Sud América	39	(3)
2008–2009	Atenas	35	(15)
2010	Cobreloa	1	(0)
2010	Deportes Concepción	7	(0)
2010–2011	Montevideo Wanderers	5	(0)
2011	ESPOLI	4	(0)
2011–2012	El Tanque Sisley	6	(0')
2012	Palermo FC	12	(8)
2012	Uniautónoma	18	(6)
2013	Juanicó	–	(–)
2013	Canelones (city team)	–	(–)
2014	Libertad Canelones	–	(–)
2015	Liverpool Canelones	–	(–)
2019–2020	Libertad Canelones	–	(–)
Total		134	(32)
- * Club domestic league appearances and goals

Álvaro Gabriel López Molinari (born August 24, 1983, in San Carlos), known as Gabriel López, is a former Uruguayan professional footballer who played as a striker.

== Teams ==
- (Uruguay) River Plate 2006
- (Uruguay) Liverpool de Canelones 2007
- (Uruguay) Canelones (city team) 2007
- (Uruguay) Sud América 2007–2008
- (Uruguay) Atenas 2008–2009
- (Chile) Cobreloa 2010
- (Chile) Deportes Concepción 2010
- (Uruguay) Montevideo Wanderers 2010
- (Ecuador) ESPOLI 2011
- (Uruguay) El Tanque Sisley 2011–2012
- (Uruguay) Palermo FC 2012
- (Colombia) Uniautónoma 2012
- (Uruguay) Juanicó 2013
- (Uruguay) Canelones (city team) 2013
- (Uruguay) Libertad de Canelones 2014
- (Uruguay) Liverpool de Canelones 2015
- (Uruguay) Libertad de Canelones 2019–2020
