= Homero Sartori =

Argentine-Brazilian footballer (born 1983)

Homero Sartori (born March 28, 1983, in Jales, Brazil) is an Argentine-Brazilian former professional footballer who played as a defender during the 2000s and 2010s, predominantly in Argentina and most notably for Club Almagro in the Argentine first division between 2001 and 2004.

== Teams ==
- Almagro 2001–2005
- Unión de Santa Fe 2005–2006
- CAI 2006
- Comunicaciones 2007–2008
- Deportivo Morón 2008–2009
- Almirante Brown 2009–2010
- River Plate Puerto Rico 2009–2010
- Deportivo Español 2011
- Club Comunicaciones 2011–2012
- Sportivo Las Parejas 2012–2013
