= Ali Rabee (footballer, born 1983) =

Emirati association football player

Ali Rabee علي ربيع
Personal information
- Full name: Ali Rabee Fairouz Al Mesmari
- Date of birth: 19 March 1983 (age 43)
- Place of birth: Emirates
- Height: 1.79 m (5 ft 10 in)
- Position: Goalkeeper

Youth career
- Al-Fujairah

Senior career*
Years	Team	Apps	(Gls)
2004–2007	Al-Fujairah		
2007–2011	Al-Wahda		
2011–2017	Ajman		
2012–2013	→ Al-Ahli (loan)		
- * Club domestic league appearances and goals

Ali Rabee (Arabic:علي ربيع) (born 19 March 1983) is an Emirati footballer. He currently plays as a goalkeeper .

== Career ==
He formerly played for Al-Fujairah, Al-Wahda, Ajman, and Al-Ahli.
