= Falcon Brewery =

Swedish brewery company

- Company type: Subsidiary
- Genre: Brewery
- Founded: 1896
- Founder: John L Skantze
- Headquarters: Falkenberg, Sweden
- Products: Falcon
- Owner: Carlsberg Group

Falcon Brewery (Bryggeri AB Falken) was a brewery company in Falkenberg, Sweden. After being bought by Carlsberg it is now one of their production facilities.

The brewery was founded in 1896 by John L Skantze who picked Falkenberg because financial support was found there. In 1955 they started selling beer under the Falcon name. The company continued to grow, but after the ban on Class IIB beer the company came into difficulties and in 1977 it was bought by Pripps and was combined with Sandwalls in Borås (closed in 1981). 1985 the company was split into Falken that manufactured and Falcon that handled marketing, distribution and sales. In 1994 the company was merged as Falcon.

1989 Falcon was combined with Till breweries in Östersund.

1996 the company was sold to Carlsberg.
