= Douglas Silva (footballer, born 1983) =

Brazilian footballer

Personal information
- Full name: Douglas Silva Delfino
- Date of birth: 22 April 1983 (age 43)
- Place of birth: Porto Alegre, Brazil
- Height: 1.74 m (5 ft 9 in)
- Position: Defensive midfielder

Team information
- Current team: Pelotas

Youth career
- Grêmio

Senior career*
Years	Team	Apps	(Gls)
2003–2004	Grêmio		
2006–2009	Coritiba	10	(0)
2010–2011	Ceará	0	(0)
2010	→ América de Natal (loan)	6	(0)
2012–	Pelotas		
- * Club domestic league appearances and goals as of 11 September 2010

Douglas Silva Delfino (born 22 April 1983 in Porto Alegre), better known as Douglas Silva, is a Brazilian professional footballer who plays as a defensive midfielder for Esporte Clube Pelotas.

== Career ==
He began his career at Grêmio.
