= Kolawole Agodirin =

Nigerian footballer (born 1983)

Personal information
- Full name: Kolawole Oyelola Agodirin
- Date of birth: 2 March 1983 (age 43)
- Place of birth: Offa, Nigeria
- Height: 1.71 m (5 ft 7 1/2 in)
- Position: Forward

Team information
- Current team: Sambenedettese

Youth career
- Reggiana
- 2002–2003: → Venezia (loan)
- 2003: AlbinoLeffe
- 2003: → Venezia (loan)

Senior career*
Years	Team	Apps	(Gls)
2003–2004	AlbinoLeffe	0	(0)
2003–2004	→ Mantova (loan)	10	(0)
2004–2006	Latina	31	(3)
2006–2007	Andria	6	(0)
2007	Olbia	15	(3)
2007–2008	Viterbese	31	(10)
2008–2010	SPAL	29	(1)
2010	Como	3	(0)
2010–2012	Foggia	42	(11)
2012–2013	Latina	38	(8)
2013–2015	Casertana	36	(9)
- * Club domestic league appearances and goals

Kolawole Oyelola Agodirin (born 2 March 1983) is a Nigerian footballer.

== Biography ==
Agodirin was signed by Venezia in August 2002. He was loaned to Serie C2 club Mantova in the 2003–04 season. He then left for Latina in a co-ownership deal with Venezia. After Venezia went bankrupt, Agodirin remained at Latina but only played 5 league matches, starting from the 5th round counting from the end. In 2006–07 Serie C2 season, he was signed by Andria. He then played for Olbia and Viterbese.

In 2008, Agodirin left for Lega Pro Prima Divisione club SPAL. On 1 February 2010, he was signed by Como.

In August 2010, Agodirin was signed by Foggia.

On 31 January 2012, he moved to Latina. He was part of the squad that gain promotion to Serie B as well as winning the Coppa Italia for Lega Pro clubs in 2013. On 9 September 2013, he joined Casertana as a free agent. In the 2015–2016 season, he was playing for Catanzaro. In the summer 2016, signing for Bisceglie to move, in January 2017, to Sambenedettese.
