= 2024–25 Coupe de France preliminary rounds, Bourgogne-Franche-Comté =

The 2024–25 Coupe de France preliminary rounds, Bourgogne-Franche-Comté was the qualifying competition to decide which teams from the leagues of the Bourgogne-Franche-Comté region of France took part in the main competition from the seventh round.

A total of nine teams qualified from the Bourgogne-Franche-Comté preliminary rounds.

In 2023–24, FC Sochaux Montbéliard progressed the furthest in the competition, reaching the round of 16, where they were heavily beaten by Ligue 1 opponents Rennes.

== Draws and fixtures ==
The first round draw was published by the league on 11 July 2024, with 138 ties drawn including all teams from District level divisions, and all but 24 teams from the third tier of the Regional league. The second round draw was published on 20 August 2024, with the 24 previously exempted Regional 3 teams and the 38 Regional 2 teams joining at this stage. The third round was published on 3 September 2024, having taken place the day before, and saw the 23 Regional 1 teams and the 11 Championnat National 3 teams enter the competition. Subsequent draws were streamed live by the league from various locations. The fourth round draw took place on 17 September 2024, with the single team from Championnat National 2 entering at this stage. The fifth round draw took place on 1 October 2024, with the two teams from Championnat National entering at this stage. The sixth round draw took place on 15 October 2024. In total, 376 clubs from the region entered the competition; 375 during the preliminary rounds, and AJ Auxerre of Ligue 1 during the main competition.

=== First round ===
These matches were played on 17 and 18 August 2024.

First Round Results: Bourgogne-Franche-Comté
Tie no	Home team (Tier)	Score	Away team (Tier)
1.	US Coulanges-lès-Nevers (9)	4–2	FREP Luthenay-Uxeloup (10)
2.	US Saint-Pierre Foot 58 (9)	1–1 (4–5 p)	CS Corbigeois (9)
3.	FC Chevannes (10)	0–11	CA Saint-Georges (8)
4.	Amicale Franco-Portugais Sens (8)	2–1 (Note: Tie reversed from original draw.)	US Dionysienne (10)
5.	AS Gurgy (8)	5–2	US Toucycoise (9)
6.	US Cercycoise (10)	1–0	ASF Courson (10)
7.	Aillant SF (10)	4–2	JS Marzy (10)
8.	US Moulinoise (9)	3–1	AS Saint-Benin (8)
9.	AS Sergines (11)	0–1	ES Appoigny (8)
10.	FC Champs-sur-Yonne (9)	1–1 (2–4 p)	AS Charrin (9)
11.	FC Château-Chinon-Arleuf (9)	0–2	AS Guerigny Urzy (9)
12.	AS Varzy (10)	2–2 (5–4 p)	UF La Machine (8)
13.	SC Gron Véron (10)	0–3	Étoile Sud Nivernaise 58 (8)
14.	FC Alligny-Saint-Amand (10)	1–3	US Luzy-Millay (9)
15.	ASC Pougues (9)	1–3	RC Nevers-Challuy Sermoise (8)
16.	FC Aignay Baigneux (10)	1–4	AS Magny (8)
17.	ASFC Daix (10)	4–0	AS Serein (11)
18.	UF Tonnerrois (9)	2–3	FC Saint-Rémy-les-Montbard (9)
19.	Union Châtillonniase Colombine (8)	2–2 (7–6 p)	Auxerre Sports Citoyen (9)
20.	Olympique Chaignay (10)	2–2 (6–5 p)	FC Sombernon-Gissey (10)
21.	FC Crépand (11)	5–1	UFC Ouche (11)
22.	SC Malay-le-Grand (10)	1–3	US Varennes (9)
23.	Entente Châtel-Gérard Nucerien (9)	3–0 (Note: Tie won by means of forfeit.)	AS Chablis (9)
24.	Montbard Venarey Football (9)	3–3 (3–4 p)	US Cerisiers (8)
25.	US Semur-Époisses (10)	4–3	AS Montoise (10)
26.	AS Pouilly-en-Auxois (10)	0–1	ASC Plombières-Lès-Dijon (10)
27.	SC Vitteaux (12)	0–8	FC Coulanges-la-Vineuse (10)
28.	ESIV Saint-Sérotin (11)	4–1	ES Héry (9)
29.	Joncy Salornay Val de Guye (10)	0–1	US Savigny-lès-Beaune (11)
30.	FC Saulon-Corcelles (10)	1–3	FC Saint-Rémy (10)
31.	Champforgeuil FC (11)	1–3	HLS Football (9)
32.	EJS Épinacoise (10)	1–3	ÉFC Demigny (10)
33.	US Givry-Saint-Désert (11)	0–5	AS Varennes-le-Grand (10)
34.	Sassenay Virey Lessard Fragnes FC (12)	0–3	FC Verdunois (10)
35.	US Nolay (11)	0–1	ASL Lux (10)
36.	AS Canton du Bligny-sur-Ouche (11)	2–2 (3–5 p)	FLL Gergy-Verjux (10)
37.	ASD DOM Dijon (11)	2–4	FC Marmagne (10)
38.	FC des 2 Côtes Corgoloin-Ladoix (9)	1–0	AS Lacanche (10)
39.	US Meursault (9)	1–3	JS Crechoise (8)
40.	AS Cheminots Chagnotins (10)	1–3	AS Mellecey-Mercurey (9)
41.	Dijon ULFE (10)	4–0	US Buxynoise (9)
42.	AS Seurre (11)	0–4	ASC Manlay (10)
43.	AS Châtenoy-le-Royal (8)	2–2 (4–3 p)	US Crissotine (9)
44.	US Rully Fontaines (9)	0–0 (4–1 p)	SC Etangois (9)
45.	FC Clessé (9)	4–1	CSL Chenôve (10)
46.	CLL Échenon (11)	0–8	FC Rochefort Athletic (8)
47.	US Trois Monts (10)	1–5	AS Saint Usage Saint-Jean-de-Losne (8)
48.	CS Auxonnais (11)	8–1	AS Longchamp (11)
49.	AS Moissey (11)	5–1	PS Dole-Crissey (10)
50.	AS Genlis (9)	4–0	FR Archelange-Gredisans-Menotey (10)
51.	FC Aiglepierre (10)	0–1	AS Saint-Aubin (10)
52.	FC Neuilly-Crimolois Sennecey (9)	2–1	Jura Stad' FC (9)
53.	AS Cessey-sur-Tille (12)	2–2 (4–2 p)	Football Champdotre Longeault Association (11)
54.	Gresilles FC (11)	0–0 (4–1 p) (Note: Gresilles FC penalised for fielding a player not listed on the official teamsheet, Poligny-Grimont FC qualify.)	Poligny-Grimont FC (8)
55.	AS Foucherans (10)	2–2 (11–10 p)	FC Aiserey-Izeure (11)
56.	Pumas FC (12)	0–3	CF Talant (9)
57.	FC Remilly (11)	3–4 (Note: ASC Besançon Mahoraise penalised for fielding a suspended player, FC Remilly qualify.)	ASC Besançon Mahoraise (9)
58.	FC Monts de Gy (10)	1–2	ES Marnaysienne (8)
59.	Dinamo Dijon (11)	0–6	Tilles FC (9)
60.	FC Vingeanne (11)	1–0	Val de Norge FC (10)
61.	FC Seveux-Motey (11)	4–0	AS Til-Châtel (11)
62.	US Marey-Cussey (11)	0–5	FC Grand Besançon (9)
63.	FC Mirebellois-Pontailler-Lamarche (9)	1–4	AS Besançon Espérance (10)
64.	ES Dannemarie (10)	0–3	ASC Velotte (9)
65.	US Val de Pesmes (9)	1–0	FEP Autrey-lès-Gray (10)
66.	AS Beure (12)	1–2	US Rigny (10)
67.	Espérance Arc-Gray (9)	1–3	SC Besançon (10)
68.	CS Sanvignes (8)	3–1	FC Sennecé-lès-Mâcon (9)
69.	FC Vitry-en-Charollais (10)	3–0	Dun Sornin Chauffailles Brionnais (9)
70.	AS Saint-Agnan (10)	1–0	FC Bois du Verne (11)
71.	AS Vendenesse (11)	3–0	FC Uxeau (11)
72.	CS Tramayes (10)	2–3	CS Orion (10)
73.	Gachères FC (10)	0–1	SR Clayettois (8)
74.	US Saint-Bonnet/La Guiche (9)	1–1 (3–0 p)	US Rigny-sur-Arroux (9)
75.	Montcenis FC (10)	1–1 (3–4 p)	Saint-Vallier Sport (10)
76.	Vigneronne Sportive Romanechoise (11)	1–10	Mâcon FC (8)
77.	AS Saint-Vincent-Bragny (9)	3–1	ESA Breuil (9)
78.	JF Palingeois (9)	2–2 (3–1 p)	JS Montchanin ODRA (9)
79.	AS Ciry-le-Noble (10)	2–2 (7–6 p)	ES Pouilloux (11)
80.	Génelard Perrecy FC (11)	0–4	US Blanzy (9)
81.	AS Neuvyssois (9)	2–0	US San Martinoise (10)
82.	AS Tournus (11)	4–1	AS Frangy-en-Bresse (11)
83.	FC Épervans (10)	1–1 (3–4 p)	ES Montponnaise (10)
84.	US Perrigny Conliège (12)	0–4	FC Plateau 39 (11)
85.	CS Passenans (11)	0–6	GC Beaufort (11)
86.	CS Mervans (8)	0–7	Entente Sud Revermont (9)
87.	Olympique Montmorot (9)	1–3	FC Petite Montagne (10)
88.	USL Beaurepaire (12)	0–4	ISS Pleure (10)
89.	AS Aromas (11)	0–4	ES Branges (10)
90.	FC Charette (11)	0–3	FC Cuiseaux-Varennes (11)
91.	IS Saint-Usuge (10)	3–6	US Revermontaise (10)
92.	IS Bresse Nord (10)	7–4	FC Courlaoux (10)
93.	SC Châteaurenaud (9)	3–2	ES Saint-Germain-du-Plaine-Baudrières (10)
94.	US Lessard-en-Bresse (9)	1–1 (5–4 p)	RC Bresse Sud (9)
95.	AS Mont d'Usiers (10)	1–0	FC Val de Loue (8)
96.	ES Les Sapins (11)	1–2	Amancey-Bolandoz-Chantrans Foot (10)
97.	Arche FC (11)	3–3 (4–5 p)	ES Sirod (10)
98.	US Doubs Sud (10)	4–0	US Laveron (11)
99.	FC Massif Haut Doubs (10)	9–0	FC Mont Noir (10)
100.	FC Lac-Remoray-Vaux (10)	1–1 (6–5 p)	Jura Nord Foot (9)
101.	US Crotenay Combe d'Ain (9)	1–0	FC Haut Jura (9)
102.	Grandvaux Foot (10)	1–3	Arcade Foot (8)
103.	RCF Saint-Claude (10)	1–2	FC Mouchard-Arc-et-Senans (9)
104.	ES Doubs (9)	1–3	FC Liévremont-Arçon (9)
105.	AS Fougerolles (9)	1–2	FC Seloncourt (9)
106.	AS Magny-Vernois (10)	1–3	RC Saônois (8)
107.	SR Delle (10)	0–3	US Sochaux (9)
108.	US Franchevelle (9)	2–1	FC Pays de Luxeuil (9)
109.	Rougemont Concorde (10)	4–0	US Arbouans (11)
110.	Esperance Auxons-Miserey (10)	1–1 (5–4 p)	AO Vesoul (8)
111.	FC Suarce (10)	2–2 (1–4 p)	ASFC Belfort (8)
112.	AS Chèvremont (11)	0–1	FC Giro-Lepuix (9)
113.	US Avanne-Aveney (11)	3–2	AS Villersexel Esprels (10)
114.	SC Saint Loup-Corbenay-Magnoncourt (9)	2–1	Vallée du Breuchin FC (10)
115.	US Arcey (10)	2–2 (4–5 p)	US Sous-Roches (8)
116.	FC Châtillon-Devecey (11)	1–1 (2–4 p)	FC Colombe (9)
117.	Dampierre Foot (10)	1–0	AS Essert (10)
118.	Olympique Courcelles-lès-Montbéliard (11)	1–4	UOP Mathay (9)
119.	FC Clerval Anteuil (10)	1–2	Thise-Chalezeule FC (10)
120.	RC Voujeaucourt (10)	1–1 (3–4 p)	AS Présentevillers Sainte-Marie (10)
121.	CS Beaucourt (11)	0–0 (2–4 p)	AS Rougegoutte-Chaux (10)
122.	Bessoncourt Roppe Club Larivière (8)	2–0	SCM Valdoie (9)
123.	US Roches-lès-Blamont (11)	0–2	FC 3 Cantons (9)
124.	Espérance Monts de Villers (11)	5–1	AS Pierrefontaine et Laviron (10)
125.	US Saint Hippolyte (10)	3–2	Entente Le Châteleu (10)
126.	AS Orchamps-Val de Vennes (9)	0–0 (4–3 p)	ES Saugette Entre-Roches (8)
127.	AS Noël-Cerneux-Chenalotte (10)	4–1	AS Avoudrey (10)
128.	AS Etalans Vernierfontaine (11)	0–2	AS Plateau de La Barêche (10)
129.	US Les Fontenelles (10)	4–1	FC Plaimbois-du-Miroir (10)
130.	US Passavant (11)	3–3 (5–3 p)	US Les Écorces (8)
131.	AS Frambouhans (12)	0–6	FC Le Russey (10)
132.	US Les Fins (10)	3–1	AS Courtefontaine-Les Plains (10)
133.	ES Bretonvillers Charmoille (11)	0–6	SR Villars-sous-Dampjoux (10)
134.	Dynamo FC (12)	0–7	ES Les Fonges 91 (10)
135.	Belleherbe Sancey Foot (11)	3–1	AS Montandon (11)
136.	US Les Quatre Monts (11)	2–0	FC Premier Plateau (10)
137.	ES Trévillers Thiébouhans (11)	0–7	SC Villers-le-Lac (10)
138.	AS Feule-Solemont (11)	0–8	AS Guyans-Vennes (10)

=== Second round ===
These matches were played on 24 and 25 August 2024, with one replayed on 7 September 2024.

Second Round Results: Bourgogne-Franche-Comté
Tie no	Home team (Tier)	Score	Away team (Tier)
1.	AS Varzy (10)	1–4	RC Nevers-Challuy Sermoise (8)
2.	Aillant SF (10)	0–7	US La Charité (7)
3.	Étoile Sud Nivernaise 58 (8)	1–4	FC Nevers 58 (7)
4.	AS Charrin (9)	1–3	FC Nevers Banlay (7)
5.	CA Saint-Georges (8)	0–5	FC Decize (7)
6.	CS Corbigeois (9)	0–3	Amicale Franco-Portugais Sens (8)
7.	US Cercycoise (10)	2–3	AS Gurgy (8)
8.	AS Guerigny Urzy (9)	2–1	AS Fourchambault (8)
9.	US Moulinoise (9)	4–3	Paron FC (8)
10.	US Luzy-Millay (9)	1–6	US Coulanges-lès-Nevers (9)
11.	ES Appoigny (8)	1–0	AS Clamecy (8)
12.	ESIV Saint-Sérotin (11)	0–8	Avallon FCO (7)
13.	FC Coulanges-la-Vineuse (10)	4–2	FC Crépand (11)
14.	US Varennes (9)	0–4	Stade Auxerrois (7)
15.	US Semur-Époisses (10)	3–2	Union Châtillonniase Colombine (8)
16.	Entente Saint-Florentin FC (8)	6–0	ASUC Migennes (7)
17.	ASFC Daix (10)	1–3	US Cerisiers (8)
18.	ASC Plombières-Lès-Dijon (10)	2–1	US Joigny (8)
19.	Entente Châtel-Gérard Nucerien (9)	2–1	Olympique Chaignay (10)
20.	AS Magny (8)	2–2 (4–5 p)	FC Saint-Rémy-les-Montbard (9)
21.	US Cluny (8)	2–1	EF Villages (7)
22.	ASL Lux (10)	2–1	US Savigny-lès-Beaune (11)
23.	FC Saint-Rémy (10)	0–2	ASC Manlay (10)
24.	ÉFC Demigny (10)	0–3	FC Clessé (9)
25.	US Rully Fontaines (9)	3–4	JS Crechoise (8)
26.	FC des 2 Côtes Corgoloin-Ladoix (9)	1–7	Team Montceau Foot (7)
27.	FLL Gergy-Verjux (10)	1–7	Chalon ACF (7)
28.	Dijon ULFE (10)	4–0	AS Châtenoy-le-Royal (8)
29.	AS Mellecey-Mercurey (9)	6–0	FC Marmagne (10)
30.	FC Verdunois (10)	0–3	AS Gevrey-Chambertin (8)
31.	AS Varennes-le-Grand (10)	4–0	HLS Football (9)
32.	Poligny-Grimont FC (8)	2–4	RC Lons-le-Saunier (7)
33.	CS Auxonnais (11)	0–3	FC Rochefort Athletic (8)
34.	AS Moissey (11)	0–7	FC Neuilly-Crimolois Sennecey (9)
35.	AS Saint Usage Saint-Jean-de-Losne (8)	1–1 (4–1 p)	AS Genlis (9)
36.	AS Saint-Aubin (10)	0–2	Triangle d'Or Jura Foot (8)
37.	AS Cessey-sur-Tille (12)	2–5	US Coteaux de Seille (7)
38.	AS Foucherans (10)	1–4	ALC Longvic (7)
39.	CF Talant (9)	0–6	CL Marsannay-la-Côte (7)
40.	US Val de Pesmes (9)	0–3	Rioz FC (7)
41.	FC 4 Rivières 70 (7)	3–0	AS Perrouse (7)
42.	SC Besançon (10)	1–3	FC Grand Besançon (9)
43.	AS Besançon Espérance (10)	7–0	US Rigny (10)
44.	FC Vingeanne (11)	0–7	Tilles FC (9)
45.	FC Seveux-Motey (11)	3–1	ASC Velotte (9)
46.	FC Remilly (11)	1–4	AF Audeux/Pelousey/Pouilley-les-Vignes (8)
47.	ES Marnaysienne (8)	1–2	Chevigny Saint-Sauveur (7)
48.	AS Neuvyssois (9)	1–2	Digoin FCA (8)
49.	AS Ciry-le-Noble (10)	0–5	Sud Foot 71 (8)
50.	AS Vendenesse (11)	1–2	JO Le Creusot (7)
51.	JF Palingeois (9)	0–2	US Cheminots Paray (7)
52.	US Bourbon-Lancy FPT (8)	3–1	US Saint-Bonnet/La Guiche (9)
53.	AS Saint-Vincent-Bragny (9)	0–1	US Saint-Sernin-du-Bois (7)
54.	CS Orion (10)	2–2 (3–5 p)	SR Clayettois (8)
55.	FC Vitry-en-Charollais (10)	2–1	CS Sanvignes (8)
56.	US Blanzy (9)	0–2	Mâcon FC (8)
57.	Saint-Vallier Sport (10)	1–1 (5–4 p)	AS Saint-Agnan (10)
58.	GC Beaufort (11)	0–1	ES Montponnaise (10)
59.	US Sennecey-le-Grand et son Canton (8)	1–1 (5–6 p)	Jura Lacs Foot (7)
60.	ISS Pleure (10)	0–1	Entente Sud Revermont (9)
61.	ES Branges (10)	2–6	US Lessard-en-Bresse (9)
62.	SC Châteaurenaud (9)	3–3 (5–4 p)	AS Sornay (7)
63.	AS Tournus (11)	1–4	FC Macornay Val de Sorne (8)
64.	FC Plateau 39 (11)	6–0	IS Bresse Nord (10)
65.	US Revermontaise (10)	3–1	FC Cuiseaux-Varennes (11)
66.	FC Petite Montagne (10)	2–2 (3–5 p)	AS Sagy (8)
67.	FC Lac-Remoray-Vaux (10)	1–3	Bresse Jura Foot (7)
68.	AS Château de Joux (7)	1–0	Entente Roche-Novillars (8)
69.	FC Massif Haut Doubs (10)	0–3	Arcade Foot (8)
70.	AS Mont d'Usiers (10)	2–3	AS Levier (7)
71.	Amancey-Bolandoz-Chantrans Foot (10)	1–2	FC Mouchard-Arc-et-Senans (9)
72.	US Crotenay Combe d'Ain (9)	2–1	FCC La Joux (7)
73.	FC Liévremont-Arçon (9)	2–3	US Doubs Sud (10)
74.	ES Sirod (10)	1–3 (Note: The original fixture on 25 August 2024 was abandoned after 78 minuted, due to floodlight failure. The league ordered the game replayed on 7 September 2024.)	CS Frasne (8)
75.	ASFC Belfort (8)	4–3	JS Lure (7)
76.	Esperance Auxons-Miserey (10)	3–0	AS Nord Territoire (8)
77.	US Larians-et-Munans (7)	1–1 (9–8 p)	FC Noidanais (7)
78.	FC Colombe (9)	0–1	US Châtenois-les-Forges (8)
79.	UOP Mathay (9)	0–0 (6–7 p)	US Sochaux (9)
80.	Thise-Chalezeule FC (10)	1–1 (2–4 p)	AS Belfort Sud (7)
81.	Dampierre Foot (10)	0–3	AS Danjoutin-Andelnans-Méroux (7)
82.	AS Rougegoutte-Chaux (10)	1–2	SC Saint Loup-Corbenay-Magnoncourt (9)
83.	Rougemont Concorde (10)	1–4	Bessoncourt Roppe Club Larivière (8)
84.	FC Seloncourt (9)	1–4	AS Mélisey-Saint Barthélemy (8)
85.	US Sous-Roches (8)	2–1	AS Présentevillers Sainte-Marie (10)
86.	FC Giro-Lepuix (9)	1–1 (3–4 p)	ES Exincourt-Taillecourt (8)
87.	US Avanne-Aveney (11)	0–7	AS Bavilliers (7)
88.	RC Saônois (8)	0–0 (3–4 p)	Haute-Lizaine Pays d'Héricourt (8)
89.	US Franchevelle (9)	0–6	FC Pays Minier (8)
90.	US Les Fontenelles (10)	0–4	FC Bart (7)
91.	US Passavant (11)	1–6	FC L'Isle-sur-le-Doubs (7)
92.	SR Villars-sous-Dampjoux (10)	1–4	AS Baume-les-Dames (7)
93.	Belleherbe Sancey Foot (11)	0–3	AS Guyans-Vennes (10)
94.	ES Les Fonges 91 (10)	4–3	FC Le Russey (10)
95.	US Saint Hippolyte (10)	1–2	AS Orchamps-Val de Vennes (9)
96.	SC Villers-le-Lac (10)	2–1	AS Noël-Cerneux-Chenalotte (10)
97.	US Les Fins (10)	2–4	US Les Quatre Monts (11)
98.	FC 3 Cantons (9)	0–5	AS Sâone-Mamirolle (8)
99.	AS Plateau de La Barêche (10)	0–2	FC Montfaucon-Morre-Gennes-La Vèze (7)
100.	Espérance Monts de Villers (11)	1–5	ES Pays Maîchois (7)

=== Third round ===
These matches were played on 14 and 15 September 2024.

Third Round Results: Bourgogne-Franche-Comté
Tie no	Home team (Tier)	Score	Away team (Tier)
1.	Entente Saint-Florentin FC (8)	0–8	FC Gueugnon (5)
2.	FC Nevers 58 (7)	1–0	AS Garchizy (6)
3.	FC Decize (7)	0–1	ASC Saint-Apollinaire (6)
4.	RC Nevers-Challuy Sermoise (8)	0–0 (4–1 p)	US La Charité (7)
5.	AS Gurgy (8)	0–7	ASPTT Dijon (5)
6.	AS Gevrey-Chambertin (8)	4–1	Amicale Franco-Portugais Sens (8)
7.	AS Guerigny Urzy (9)	1–1 (5–3 p)	FC Nevers Banlay (7)
8.	ES Appoigny (8)	0–1	FC Sens (6)
9.	Stade Auxerrois (7)	2–0	Fontaine-lès-Dijon FC (6)
10.	ASC Plombières-Lès-Dijon (10)	3–0	US Moulinoise (9)
11.	US Coulanges-lès-Nevers (9)	1–1 (3–2 p)	FC Coulanges-la-Vineuse (10)
12.	ASA Vauzelles (6)	0–0 (5–6 p)	Union Cosnoise Sportive (5)
13.	FC Saint-Rémy-les-Montbard (9)	1–0	Chevigny Saint-Sauveur (7)
14.	ASC Manlay (10)	2–1	US Cerisiers (8)
15.	Entente Châtel-Gérard Nucerien (9)	1–2	AS Quetigny (6)
16.	US Semur-Époisses (10)	0–2	Avallon FCO (7)
17.	US Cheminots Paray (7)	6–0	AS Sagy (8)
18.	ASL Lux (10)	0–8	AS Chapelloise (6)
19.	FC Neuilly-Crimolois Sennecey (9)	3–0	Dijon ULFE (10)
20.	AS Mellecey-Mercurey (9)	1–1 (4–2 p)	ES Fauverney-Rouvres-Bretenière (6)
21.	SC Châteaurenaud (9)	0–5	US Cheminots Dijonnais (6)
22.	AS Varennes-le-Grand (10)	3–1	US Cluny (8)
23.	ES Montponnaise (10)	1–2	SR Clayettois (8)
24.	FC Vitry-en-Charollais (10)	2–3	Sud Foot 71 (8)
25.	US Saint-Sernin-du-Bois (7)	1–1 (4–2 p)	FR Saint Marcel (6)
26.	US Bourbon-Lancy FPT (8)	2–1	Louhans-Cuiseaux FC (5)
27.	ALC Longvic (7)	0–1	Jura Dolois Football (5)
28.	Mâcon FC (8)	2–2 (3–4 p)	FC Montceau Bourgogne (5)
29.	Jura Lacs Foot (7)	2–3	Is-Selongey Football (6)
30.	Chalon ACF (7)	1–3	Digoin FCA (8)
31.	US Lessard-en-Bresse (9)	0–2	CL Marsannay-la-Côte (7)
32.	FC Clessé (9)	0–3	Team Montceau Foot (7)
33.	Saint-Vallier Sport (10)	0–7	FC Chalon (6)
34.	JS Crechoise (8)	2–0	JO Le Creusot (7)
35.	US Les Quatre Monts (11)	0–4	Triangle d'Or Jura Foot (8)
36.	AS Besançon Espérance (10)	2–1	Esperance Auxons-Miserey (10)
37.	Bresse Jura Foot (7)	1–3	AS Ornans (6)
38.	Rioz FC (7)	7–0	Arcade Foot (8)
39.	Entente Sud Revermont (9)	0–7	CA Pontarlier (5)
40.	RC Lons-le-Saunier (7)	3–3 (2–3 p)	FC Champagnole (6)
41.	CS Frasne (8)	4–0	AS Saint Usage Saint-Jean-de-Losne (8)
42.	AF Audeux/Pelousey/Pouilley-les-Vignes (8)	1–2	AS Sâone-Mamirolle (8)
43.	Besançon Football (5)	2–1	CCS Val d'Amour Mont-sous-Vaudrey (6)
44.	FC Plateau 39 (11)	0–5	AS Château de Joux (7)
45.	FC Mouchard-Arc-et-Senans (9)	5–0	FC Macornay Val de Sorne (8)
46.	US Crotenay Combe d'Ain (9)	2–3	FC 4 Rivières 70 (7)
47.	US Revermontaise (10)	0–4	AS Beaune (6)
48.	US Coteaux de Seille (7)	1–1 (8–9 p)	US Saint-Vit (6)
49.	US Doubs Sud (10)	0–2	AS Levier (7)
50.	FC Grand Besançon (9)	0–7	UF Mâconnais (5)
51.	Tilles FC (9)	4–0	ES Les Fonges 91 (10)
52.	FC Rochefort Athletic (8)	2–0	FC Montfaucon-Morre-Gennes-La Vèze (7)
53.	AS Guyans-Vennes (10)	2–0	SC Villers-le-Lac (10)
54.	SC Saint Loup-Corbenay-Magnoncourt (9)	1–1 (4–5 p)	ES Exincourt-Taillecourt (8)
55.	FC Seveux-Motey (11)	1–1 (6–7 p)	ES Pays Maîchois (7)
56.	FC Bart (7)	2–4	ASM Belfort (5)
57.	AS Baume-les-Dames (7)	0–2	US Pont-de-Roide (6)
58.	AS Mélisey-Saint Barthélemy (8)	5–0	US Châtenois-les-Forges (8)
59.	AS Orchamps-Val de Vennes (9)	1–4	FC L'Isle-sur-le-Doubs (7)
60.	AS Danjoutin-Andelnans-Méroux (7)	1–1 (4–5 p)	FC Grandvillars (6)
61.	US Sochaux (9)	2–0	ASFC Belfort (8)
62.	FC Morteau-Montlebon (6)	0–0 (3–5 p)	Racing Besançon (5)
63.	AS Bavilliers (7)	0–0 (4–5 p)	FC Valdahon-Vercel (6)
64.	Haute-Lizaine Pays d'Héricourt (8)	0–0 (4–5 p)	FC Pays Minier (8)
65.	AS Belfort Sud (7)	2–6	FC Vesoul (6)
66.	Bessoncourt Roppe Club Larivière (8)	2–1	US Larians-et-Munans (7)
67.	US Sous-Roches (8)	0–2	AS Audincourt (6)

=== Fourth round ===
These matches were played on 28 and 29 September 2024.

Fourth Round Results: Bourgogne-Franche-Comté
Tie no	Home team (Tier)	Score	Away team (Tier)
1.	ASPTT Dijon (5)	1–1 (3–2 p)	ASC Saint-Apollinaire (6)
2.	AS Beaune (6)	0–1	FC Montceau Bourgogne (5)
3.	AS Quetigny (6)	0–2	US Cheminots Paray (7)
4.	ASC Manlay (10)	1–2	Sud Foot 71 (8)
5.	Digoin FCA (8)	1–0	AS Guerigny Urzy (9)
6.	Avallon FCO (7)	1–1 (4–2 p)	RC Nevers-Challuy Sermoise (8)
7.	Is-Selongey Football (6)	1–0	Union Cosnoise Sportive (5)
8.	Stade Auxerrois (7)	0–2	FC Gueugnon (5)
9.	SR Clayettois (8)	1–1 (3–4 p)	US Coulanges-lès-Nevers (9)
10.	FC Sens (6)	4–0 (Note: Tie reversed from original draw.)	FC Nevers 58 (7)
11.	US Bourbon-Lancy FPT (8)	5–0	FC Saint-Rémy-les-Montbard (9)
12.	ASC Plombières-Lès-Dijon (10)	1–3	Tilles FC (9)
13.	US Cheminots Dijonnais (6)	6–0	US Saint-Vit (6)
14.	Triangle d'Or Jura Foot (8)	0–1	FC Rochefort Athletic (8)
15.	FC Champagnole (6)	8–0	Rioz FC (7)
16.	FC Neuilly-Crimolois Sennecey (9)	0–6	AS Chapelloise (6)
17.	CL Marsannay-la-Côte (7)	0–1	FC 4 Rivières 70 (7)
18.	AS Sâone-Mamirolle (8)	0–5	Jura Sud Foot (4)
19.	UF Mâconnais (5)	2–0	Besançon Football (5)
20.	AS Gevrey-Chambertin (8)	1–2	FC Chalon (6)
21.	AS Varennes-le-Grand (10)	0–2	Jura Dolois Football (5)
22.	Team Montceau Foot (7)	2–2 (5–4 p)	US Saint-Sernin-du-Bois (7)
23.	JS Crechoise (8)	0–2	AS Mellecey-Mercurey (9)
24.	US Sochaux (9)	0–4	FC Grandvillars (6)
25.	CA Pontarlier (5)	2–2 (5–4 p)	Racing Besançon (5)
26.	AS Besançon Espérance (10)	1–1 (5–4 p)	AS Mélisey-Saint Barthélemy (8)
27.	FC L'Isle-sur-le-Doubs (7)	3–2	CS Frasne (8)
28.	US Pont-de-Roide (6)	0–0 (5–6 p)	FC Vesoul (6)
29.	FC Pays Minier (8)	1–5	AS Audincourt (6)
30.	Bessoncourt Roppe Club Larivière (8)	1–3	FC Valdahon-Vercel (6)
31.	AS Château de Joux (7)	1–1 (10–11 p)	ASM Belfort (5)
32.	ES Pays Maîchois (7)	2–1	AS Ornans (6)
33.	FC Mouchard-Arc-et-Senans (9)	0–2	AS Levier (7)
34.	ES Exincourt-Taillecourt (8)	2–0	AS Guyans-Vennes (10)

=== Fifth round ===
These matches were played on 12 and 13 October 2024.

Fifth Round Results: Bourgogne-Franche-Comté
Tie no	Home team (Tier)	Score	Away team (Tier)
1.	UF Mâconnais (5)	2–0	FC Sens (6)
2.	US Bourbon-Lancy FPT (8)	0–1	FC Gueugnon (5)
3.	Avallon FCO (7)	1–0	FC Montceau Bourgogne (5)
4.	AS Mellecey-Mercurey (9)	2–2 (3–5 p)	Is-Selongey Football (6)
5.	Digoin FCA (8)	2–2 (4–5 p)	Team Montceau Foot (7)
6.	US Cheminots Dijonnais (6)	1–4	Dijon FCO (3)
7.	US Coulanges-lès-Nevers (9)	2–1	Sud Foot 71 (8)
8.	US Cheminots Paray (7)	0–2	FC Chalon (6)
9.	AS Chapelloise (6)	0–2	ASPTT Dijon (5)
10.	FC Rochefort Athletic (8)	2–2 (5–6 p)	FC Valdahon-Vercel (6)
11.	ES Exincourt-Taillecourt (8)	1–1 (4–3 p)	FC L'Isle-sur-le-Doubs (7)
12.	FC Grandvillars (6)	2–0	ES Pays Maîchois (7)
13.	FC Vesoul (6)	3–1 (Note: Tie reversed from original draw.)	CA Pontarlier (5)
14.	FC Champagnole (6)	0–1	Jura Sud Foot (4)
15.	AS Audincourt (6)	3–2	FC 4 Rivières 70 (7)
16.	Tilles FC (9)	0–3	Jura Dolois Football (5)
17.	AS Levier (7)	1–1 (1–2 p)	ASM Belfort (5)
18.	AS Besançon Espérance (10)	0–6	FC Sochaux Montbéliard (3)

=== Sixth round ===
These matches were played on 26 and 27 October 2024.

Sixth Round Results: Bourgogne-Franche-Comté
Tie no	Home team (Tier)	Score	Away team (Tier)
1.	ASPTT Dijon (5)	0–4	Dijon FCO (3)
2.	ASM Belfort (5)	0–2	Jura Sud Foot (4)
3.	FC Chalon (6)	1–1 (4–5 p)	Jura Dolois Football (5)
4.	Team Montceau Foot (7)	1–2	UF Mâconnais (5)
5.	ES Exincourt-Taillecourt (8)	0–5	FC Vesoul (6)
6.	AS Audincourt (6)	0–3	FC Grandvillars (6)
7.	US Coulanges-lès-Nevers (9)	1–2	FC Valdahon-Vercel (6)
8.	Avallon FCO (7)	1–3	FC Sochaux Montbéliard (3)
9.	Is-Selongey Football (6)	1–1 (3–5 p)	FC Gueugnon (5)
