= 2018–19 Coupe de France =

Tournament details
- Country: France

Final positions
- Champions: Rennes (3rd title)
- Runners-up: Paris Saint-Germain

Tournament statistics
- Top goal scorer(s): Franck Julienne; Oumar Pouye (5 goals each)

The 2018–19 Coupe de France was the 102nd season of the main football cup competition of France. The competition was organised by the French Football Federation (FFF) and was open to all clubs in French football, as well as clubs from the overseas departments and territories (Guadeloupe, French Guiana, Martinique, Mayotte, New Caledonia (AS Magenta, winner of 2018 New Caledonia Cup), Tahiti (AS Dragon, winner of 2017–18 Tahiti Cup), Réunion, Saint Martin and Saint Pierre and Miquelon).

Paris Saint-Germain were the four-time defending champions, but lost in the final on penalties to Rennes, who won their third Coupe de France title and first since 1971.

== Dates ==
Dates for the first two qualifying round are set by the individual Regional leagues. The remaining qualifying rounds, the seventh and eight round, and the round of 64 take place at weekends. The later rounds up to, but not including, the final, take place on midweek evenings. The final will take place on Saturday 27 April 2019.

Round	Draw Date	Matches Played
Third	various	15 and 16 September 2018
Fourth	various	29 and 30 September 2018
Fifth	various	13 and 14 October 2018
Sixth	various	27 and 28 October 2018
Seventh	31 October 2018	17 and 18 November 2018
Eighth	20 November 2018	8 and 9 December 2018
Round of 64	10 December 2018	5 and 6 January 2019
Round of 32	7 January 2019	22 and 23 January 2019
Round of 16	23 January 2019	5 and 6 February 2019
Quarter-finals	6 February 2019	26 and 27 February 2019
Semi-finals	27 February 2019	2 and 3 April 2019
Final	n/a	27 April 2019

== Teams ==
=== Round 1 to 6 ===
The first six rounds, and any preliminaries required, are organised by the Regional Leagues and the Overseas Territories, who allow teams from within their league structure to enter at any point up to the third round. Teams from Championnat National 3 enter at the third round, those from Championnat National 2 enter at the fourth round and those from Championnat National enter at the fifth round.

The number of teams entering at each qualifying round was as follows:

Region	Prelim	First	Second	Third	Fourth	Fifth
Nouvelle-Aquitaine		468	102	12	4	1
Pays-de-la-Loire		438	45	30	1	3
Centre-Val de Loire	120	86	11	10	4	1
Corsica			16	14 (Note: 3 teams that should have entered in third round given byes to fourth round)	5	0
Bourgogne-Franche-Comté		288	38	30 (Note: plus one from Saint Pierre and Miquelon)	3	0
Grand Est: Alsace		330				
Grand Est: Champagne-Ardenne		84				
Grand Est: Lorraine		324				
Grand Est Combined			67	94	4	0
Méditerranée		170	21	9	7	1
Occitanie: Ariège		14	3			
Occitanie: Aveyron		32	6			
Occitanie: Gers		14	5			
Occitanie: Lot		18	1			
Occitanie: Hautes-Pyrénées		16	4			
Occitanie: Tarn		28	4			
Occitanie: Tarn-et-Garonne		16	4			
Occitanie: Haut-Garonne		46	19			
Occitanie: Aude		32	0 (Note: 2 first round winners bye to third round)			
Occitanie: Gard-Lozère		42	15			
Occitanie: Hérault		52	14			
Occitanie: Pyrénées-Orientales		14	7			
Occitanie Combined				45	2	1
Hauts-de-France: Somme		100	0			
Hauts-de-France: Aisne	6	81	0			
Hauts-de-France: Flandres	2	139	0			
Hauts-de-France: Côte d'Opale		128	0			
Hauts-de-France: Escaut		178	0 (Note: 1 first round winner bye to third round)			
Hauts-de-France: Oise		108	0			
Hauts-de-France: Artois	6	137	0			
Hauts-de-France Combined				84	3	3
Normandie		258	81	11	2	2
Bretagne		534	97	30	4	1
Paris IDF		378	84	12 (Note: 4 second round winners bye to fourth round)	8	2
Auvergne-Rhône-Alpes		746	15 (Note: 6 first round winners bye to third round)	83	6	3
Réunion			12	26	0	0
Mayotte		30	17	0	0	0
Guadeloupe			26	19	0	0
Martinique			44	10	0	0
French Guiana				26	3	0
Saint Pierre and Miquelon		2	1 (Note: winner entered into the Bourgogne-Franche-Comté draw)			

=== Round 7 ===
145 qualifiers from the Regional Leagues will be joined by the 11 qualifiers from the Overseas Territories and the 20 teams from Ligue 2.

==== Ligue 2 ====
- Ajaccio
- Auxerre
- Béziers
- Brest
- Châteauroux
- Clermont
- Gazélec Ajaccio
- Grenoble
- Le Havre
- Lens
- Lorient
- Metz
- Nancy
- Niort
- Orléans
- Paris FC
- Red Star
- Sochaux
- Troyes
- Valenciennes

==== Regional Leagues ====
Figures in parentheses indicate the tier of the French football league system the team play at.

Nouvelle-Aquitaine: 12 teams

- Pau FC (3)
- Bergerac Périgord FC (4)
- Genêts Anglet (5)
- Angoulême CFC (5)
- FC Chauray (5)
- US Chauvigny (5)
- US Lège Cap Ferret (5)
- Limoges FC (5)
- Stade Poitevin FC (5)
- SO Châtellerault (6)
- La Brède FC (6)
- FC Tartas-St Yaguen (6)

Pays de la Loire: 11 teams

- SO Cholet (3)
- Le Mans FC (3)
- Les Herbiers VF (4)
- FC Challans (5)
- USSA Vertou (5)
- Vendée Fontenay Foot (5)
- JSC Bellevue Nantes (6)
- AS Bourny Laval (6)
- AS La Châtaigneraie (6)
- Vendée Poiré-sur-Vie Football (7)
- FC La Chapelle-des-Marais (8)

Centre-Val de Loire: 4 teams

- Tours FC (3)
- Blois Football 41 (4)
- Saint-Pryvé Saint-Hilaire FC (4)
- Bourges Foot (5)

Corsica: 2 teams

- FC Bastia-Borgo (4)
- SC Bastia (5)

Bourgogne-Franche-Comté: 8 teams

- Besançon Football (5)
- FC Gueugnon (5)
- US La Charité (5)
- Louhans-Cuiseaux FC (5)
- FC Montceau Bourgogne (5)
- FC Morteau-Montlebon (5)
- US Cheminots Paray (6)
- AS Beaune (7)

Grand Est: 20 teams

- SAS Épinal (4)
- FCSR Haguenau (4)
- SC Schiltigheim (4)
- CS Sedan Ardennes (4)
- ASC Biesheim (5)
- RC Épernay Champagne (5)
- US Raon-l'Étape (5)
- FC Saint-Louis Neuweg (5)
- Sarreguemines FC (5)
- ES Thaon (5)
- FCA Troyes (5)
- RCS La Chapelle (6)
- FA Illkirch Graffenstaden (6)
- AS Prix-lès-Mézières (6)
- US Reipertswiller (6)
- Étoile Naborienne St Avold (6)
- US Avize-Grauves (7)
- ES Heillecourt (7)
- Olympique Strasbourg (7)
- FC Rossfeld (8)

Méditerranée: 5 teams

- Marignane Gignac FC (3)
- Étoile Fréjus Saint-Raphaël (4)
- Hyères FC (4)
- SC Toulon (4)
- FC Côte Bleue (5)

Occitanie: 11 teams

- Rodez AF (3)
- FC Sète 34 (4)
- Olympique Alès (5)
- Stade Beaucairois (5)
- Canet Roussillon FC (5)
- AF Lozère (5)
- US Salinières Aigues Mortes (6)
- Auch Football (6)
- Luzenac AP (6)
- St Orens FC (7)
- FC Biars-Bretenoux (8)

Hauts-de-France: 20 teams

- US Boulogne (3)
- FC Chambly (3)
- USL Dunkerque (3)
- Iris Club de Croix (4)
- Olympique Marcquois Football (5)
- Olympique Saint-Quentin (5)
- CS Avion (6)
- AFC Compiègne (6)
- AS Gamaches (6)
- US Gravelines (6)
- AS Marck (6)
- AS du Pays Neslois (6)
- US Nogent (6)
- Saint-Amand FC (6)
- US Saint-Omer (6)
- US Vimy (6)
- Wasquehal Football (6)
- CAS Escaudœuvres (7)
- ESC Longueau (7)
- ASC Hazebrouck (8)

Normandy: 8 teams

- US Avranches (3)
- CMS Oissel (4)
- AS Cherbourg Football (5)
- FC Saint-Lô Manche (5)
- AG Caennaise (6)
- Grand-Quevilly FC (6)
- USON Mondeville (6)
- AS Villers Houlgate Côte Fleurie (8)

Brittany: 14 teams

- US Concarneau (3)
- US Saint-Malo (4)
- Vannes OC (4)
- AS Vitré (4)
- Lannion FC (5)
- US Montagnarde (5)
- GSI Pontivy (5)
- Stade Pontivyen (5)
- FC Atlantique Vilaine (5)
- Guipavas GdR (6)
- AG Plouvorn (6)
- Avenir Theix (6)
- AS Vignoc-Hédé-Guipel (6)
- Stella Maris Douarnenez (7)

Paris-Île-de-France: 11 teams

- JA Drancy (3)
- L'Entente SSG (3)
- AF Bobigny (4)
- US Créteil-Lusitanos (4)
- Sainte-Geneviève Sports (4)
- US Lusitanos Saint-Maur (4)
- FC Versailles 78 (5)
- FC Melun (6)
- Noisy-le-Grand FC (6)
- ES Viry-Châtillon (6)
- AS Carrières Grésillons (9)

Auvergne-Rhône-Alpes: 19 teams

- Football Bourg-en-Bresse Péronnas 01 (3)
- AS Lyon-Duchère (3)
- FC Villefranche (3)
- ASF Andrézieux (4)
- Annecy FC (4)
- Le Puy Foot 43 Auvergne (4)
- FC Aurillac Arpajon Cantal Auvergne (5)
- FC Chamalières (5)
- FC Limonest Saint-Didier (5)
- Montluçon Football (5)
- UMS Montélimar (6)
- FC Riom (6)
- CS Volvic (6)
- US Annecy-le-Vieux (7)
- Chassieu Décines FC (7)
- US Feillens (7)
- Olympique de Valence (7)
- Entente Crest-Aouste (8)
- FC Val Lyonnais (8)

==== Overseas Territories teams ====
French Guiana: 2 teams

- ASE Matoury
- US de Matoury

Martinique: 2 teams

- Aiglon du Lamentin
- Golden Lion FC

Guadeloupe: 2 teams

- JS Vieux-Habitants
- Unité Ste Rosienne

Réunion: 2 teams

- SS Jeanne d'Arc
- AS Sainte-Suzanne

Mayotte: 1 team

- FC Mtsapéré

New Caledonia: 1 team

- AS Magenta

(French Polynesia) Tahiti: 1 team

- AS Dragon

== Seventh round ==
The draw for the seventh round was made in two parts. First the Overseas teams were drawn against opponents from the French League structure who had applied to potentially travel overseas. The main draw took place the following day.

The draw for the overseas teams took place on 30 October 2018. The main draw took place on 31 October 2018.

Matches took place on 16, 17 and 18 November 2018.

=== Ties involving overseas teams ===
16 November 2018	Golden Lion FC (Martinique)	2–4 (a.e.t.)	SAS Épinal (4)	Fort-de-France, Martinique
20:00 ECT	Parsemain 7'; Biron 90+3'	Report	Gace 3'; Krasso 45'; Sackho 93'; Abdelkadous 115'	Stadium: Stade Pierre-Aliker; Referee: Guy Gregory Prevot

17 November 2018	ASE Matoury (French Guiana)	2–3	US Concarneau (3)	Cayenne, French Guiana
16:00 GFT	Haabo 59' (pen.); Apouyou 89'	Report	Lavigne 9' (pen.); Jung 53'; Fleury 77'	Stadium: Stade Georges Chaumet; Attendance: 550; Referee: Benjamin Lepaysant

16 November 2018	Unité Ste Rosienne (Guadeloupe)	1–3	FC Côte Bleue (5)	Les Abymes, Guadeloupe
20:30 ECT	Annerose 5'	Report	Djaballah 44', 89'; Kebbal 87'	Stadium: Stade René Serge Nabajoth; Referee: Bastian Dechepy

18 November 2018	SS Jeanne d'Arc (Réunion)	0–1 (a.e.t.)	Besançon Football (5)	Saint-Pierre, Réunion
15:30 RET		Report	Machado 103'	Stadium: Stade Michel Volnay; Attendance: 2,000; Referee: Eric Wattellier

17 November 2018	AS Magenta (New Caledonia)	0–1	AF Bobigny (4)	Nouméa, New Caledonia
16:00 NCT		Report	Mendes 45'	Stadium: Stade Numa-Daly; Attendance: 2,000; Referee: Aurélien Petit

18 November 2018	Sainte-Geneviève Sports (4)	4–0	(Réunion) AS Sainte-Suzanne	Sainte-Geneviève-des-Bois
14:00 CET	Hébert 9'; Betourné 63' (pen.); Sangaré 80'; Konté 90+2'	Report		Stadium: Parc Des Sports Léo Lagrange; Attendance: 653; Referee: Brendan Roffet

17 November 2018	L'Entente SSG (3)	4–0	(Mayotte) FC Mtsapéré	Saint-Gratien
17:00 CET	Doremus 29'; Talal 32'; Sidibe 68' (pen.); N'Sondé 90+5'	Report		Stadium: Parc des Sports Michel Hidalgo; Attendance: 1,065; Referee: Antoine Grare

17 November 2018	Stade Poitevin FC (5)	0–0 (a.e.t.) (1–4 p)	(Martinique) Aiglon du Lamentin	Buxerolles
14:00 CET		Report		Stadium: Complexe Sportif Michel Amand; Attendance: 682; Referee: Romain Zamo

17 November 2018	ES Thaon (5)	3–0	(Guadeloupe) JS Vieux-Habitants	Capavenir-Vosges
14:00 CET	Colin 33' (pen.); Uhlrich 53'; Samba 60'	Report		Stadium: Stade Robert Sayer; Attendance: 609; Referee: William Toulliou

18 November 2018	FC Versailles 78 (5)	2–0	(French Polynesia) AS Dragon	Versailles
14:00 CET	Chalali 8'; Akassou 41'	Report		Stadium: Stade Montbauron; Referee: Alexandre Mercier

17 November 2018	Saint-Pryvé Saint-Hilaire FC (4)	1–0	(French Guiana) US de Matoury	Saint-Pryvé-Saint-Mesmin
14:00 CET	Moutiapoulle 90+3'	Report		Stadium: Stade du Grand Clos; Attendance: 450; Referee: Alexandre Decoster

=== Main draw ===
As in previous editions of the competition, the main draw was split into 10 regional groups, with the split primarily ensuring an equal distribution of clubs from the different tiers, and secondarily grouping by geography.

The lowest ranked team remaining in the competition at this stage was AS Carrières Grésillons from tier 9 (District division 1).

Matches took place on 16, 17 and 18 November 2018.

==== Group 7A ====
18 November 2018	St Orens FC (7)	1–2 (a.e.t.)	FC Sète 34 (4)	Saint-Orens-de-Gameville
14:30 CET	Gracia 75'	Report	Testud 34', 116'	Stadium: Complex Sportif; Attendance: 607; Referee: Samir Zolota

17 November 2018	Genêts Anglet (5)	1–3 (a.e.t.)	Pau FC (3)	Anglet
18:00 CET	N'Gadi 81' (pen.)	Report	Jarju 46'; Gueye 101'; Guilavogui 118'	Stadium: Stade Saint-Jean; Attendance: 726; Referee: Aurelien Grizon

18 November 2018	La Brède FC (6)	0–8	Bergerac Périgord FC (4)	La Brède
14:00 CET		Report	Fachan 35', 42'; Diego Gómez 49', 77'; Chevalier 61', 81'; Sarr 63', 88'	Stadium: Stade André Mabille; Attendance: 761; Referee: Azzedine Souifi

17 November 2018	Canet Roussillon FC (5)	2–1	Béziers (2)	Canet-en-Roussillon
19:00 CET	Hattab 76', 89'	Report	Kanté 49'; Sissoko (red card) 58'	Stadium: Stade Saint-Michel; Attendance: 512; Referee: Pierre Gaillouste

18 November 2018	Auch Football (6)	0–1 (a.e.t.)	Gazélec Ajaccio (2)	Auch
14:00		Report	Armand 95'	Stadium: Stade Jacques Fouroux; Attendance: 2,932; Referee: William Lavis

18 November 2018	FC Tartas-St Yaguen (6)	4–6	US Lège Cap Ferret (5)	Tartas
14:00 CET	Mourareau 25'; Josse 69', 90+1'; Urolategui 77'	Report	Mignon 26'; Nkounkou 31'; Melka 41', 45'; Dario 65'; Roldan 86' (o.g.)	Stadium: Parc des Sports Hourritiot; Attendance: 519; Referee: Cédric Mouysset

18 November 2018	Luzenac AP (6)	2–5	Rodez AF (3)	Luzenac
14:30 CET	Alonso 7'; Tati Rogeiro 25'	Report	David 9', 25'; Bonnet 19'; Caddy 60', 79'	Stadium: Stade Paul Fédou; Attendance: 515; Referee: Julien Rouquette

17 November 2018	FC Biars-Bretenoux (8)	2–3 (a.e.t.)	FC Aurillac Arpajon Cantal (5)	Biars-sur-Cère
18:00 CET	Van de Put 68' (pen.), 117' (pen.)	Report	Douillard 66'; Anne 102', 108'	Stadium: Stade Municipal; Attendance: 1,473; Referee: Rémy Rascard

==== Group 7B ====
18 November 2018	US Salinières Aigues Mortes (6)	0–1 (a.e.t.)	Marignane Gignac FC (3)	Aigues-Mortes
14:00 CET		Report	Bru 110'	Stadium: Stade du Bourgidou; Attendance: 380; Referee: Yann Gazagnes

18 November 2018	Étoile Fréjus Saint-Raphaël (4)	1–0	SC Toulon (4)	Saint-Raphaël
14:00 CET	Tlili 50' (pen.)	Report		Stadium: Stade Louis Hon; Attendance: 514; Referee: Alexandre Decoster

17 November 2018	Olympique Alès (5)	2–0	Ajaccio (2)	Alès
19:00 CET	Mouzaoui 45', 67'	Report		Stadium: Stade Pierre Pibarot; Attendance: 1,381; Referee: Jérémie Pignard

18 November 2018	AF Lozère (5)	2–3	Red Star (2)	Mende
15:00 CET	Gourmat 51'; De Freitas 76'	Report	Satli 22'; Mhirsi 45' (pen.); Lapoussin 79'	Stadium: Stade Jean-Jacques Delmas; Attendance: 1,224; Referee: Remi Landry

18 November 2018	Chassieu Décines FC (7)	1–5	Hyères FC (4)	Décines-Charpieu
15:00 CET	Decugis 90' (o.g.)	Report	Manas 10'; Dijoux 25'; Zerfaoui 60'; Pottier 80'; Brun 85'	Stadium: Stade Raymond Troussier; Attendance: 406; Referee: Julien Schmitt

17 November 2018	Entente Crest-Aouste (8)	2–0	UMS Montélimar (6)	Crest
17:00 CET	Astiima 25'; Margerand 55'	Report	Benmansour (yellow card) 30' (yellow-red card) 43'	Stadium: Stade Soubeyran; Attendance: 657; Referee: Matthieu Bonnetin

18 November 2018	Olympique de Valence (7)	0–3	Stade Beaucairois (5)	Valence
15:00 CET		Report	Sylla 14', 64'; Sebaikhi 81'	Stadium: Stade Georges Pompidou; Attendance: 963; Referee: Guillaume Janin

==== Group 7C ====
17 November 2018	FC Atlantique Vilaine (5)	1–4	Brest (2)	Redon
20:00 CET	Diaz 90+2'	Report	Mayi 20', 80'; Belaud 53'; Charbonnier 87'	Stadium: Stade Municipal; Attendance: 1,828; Referee: Yohann Rouinsard

18 November 2018	Stade Pontivyen (5)	2–0	AS Vignoc-Hédé-Guipel (6)	Pontivy
15:00 CET	Marec 32'; Tréhin 76'	Report		Stadium: Stade du Faubourg de Verdun; Attendance: 1,001; Referee: Paul Garo

17 November 2018	Avenir Theix (6)	0–2	Vannes OC (4)	Theix-Noyalo
18:00 CET		Report	Quintin 21'; Loric 80'	Stadium: Complexe Sportif de Brestivan; Attendance: 1,098; Referee: Matthieu Le Bris

18 November 2018	Guipavas GdR (6)	0–1	US Montagnarde (5)	Guipavas
14:00 CET		Report	Le Coupanec 16'	Stadium: Stade Éric Lamour; Attendance: 1,173; Referee: Léo Breulet

18 November 2018	US Saint-Malo (4)	1–0	Lorient (2)	Saint-Malo
16:30 CET	Lahaye 9'	Report		Stadium: Stade de Marville; Attendance: 2,169; Referee: Romain Lissorgue

18 November 2018	Stella Maris Douarnenez (7)	0–3	Lannion FC (5)	Douarnenez
14:00 CET		Report	Vidot 80'; Irien 86', 90'	Stadium: Stade Xavier Trellu; Attendance: 1,427; Referee: Pierre Retail

18 November 2018	FC La Chapelle-des-Marais (8)	0–5	US Avranches (3)	La Chapelle-des-Marais
14:00 CET		Report	Boateng 26', 41'; Colin 56'; Rabeï 76'; Alouache 84'	Stadium: Complexe Sportif La Perrière; Attendance: 1,251; Referee: Nicolas Rodrigues

17 November 2018	GSI Pontivy (5)	1–0	AG Plouvorn (6)	Pontivy
19:00 CET	Jégu 40'	Report	Cotty (yellow card) 60' (yellow-red card) 89'	Stadium: Stade Municipal du Faubourg de Verdun; Attendance: 582; Referee: Gauthier Lapalu

==== Group 7D ====
17 November 2018	Vendée Fontenay Foot (5)	2–3	Châteauroux (2)	Fontenay-le-Comte
18:30 CET	Bonaventure 16', 86' (pen.)	Report	Livolant 15'; Bourillon 33'; M'Boné 58'	Stadium: Stade Emmanuel Murzeau; Attendance: 1,141; Referee: Cédric Dos Santos

17 November 2018	FC Chauray (5)	0–2	Niort (2)	Chauray
18:00 CET		Report	Vion 70'; Louiserre 76'	Stadium: Stade Municipal; Attendance: 1,328; Referee: Guillaume Paradis

18 November 2018	Les Herbiers VF (4)	2–0	US Chauvigny (5)	Les Herbiers
14:30 CET	Pouye 86'; Charrier 90+1'	Report	Montavit (red card) 24'	Stadium: Stade Massabielle; Attendance: 1,254; Referee: Emmanuel Esneu

18 November 2018	JSC Bellevue Nantes (6)	1–2 (a.e.t.)	USSA Vertou (5)	Nantes
14:00 CET	Zebidi (yellow card) 85' (yellow-red card) 102'; Nebti 116'	Report	Jarsalé 105'; Lempereur 108'	Stadium: Stade de L´Orvasserie; Attendance: 980; Referee: Guillaume Bousquet

17 November 2018	Vendée Poiré-sur-Vie Football (7)	2–1	SO Cholet (3)	Le Poiré-sur-Vie
18:00 CET	Edouard 67'; Malaga 84' (o.g.)	Report	Malaga 14'	Stadium: Stade de l'Idonnière; Attendance: 867; Referee: Lakhdar El Bedoui

17 November 2018	SO Châtellerault (6)	0–2	FC Challans (5)	Châtellerault
19:00 CET		Report	N'Guessan 52'; Benahmed 73'	Stadium: Stade de la Montée Rouge; Attendance: 260; Referee: Aldric Chancioux

17 November 2018	AS La Châtaigneraie (6)	1–1 (a.e.t.) (3–4 p)	Tours FC (3)	La Châtaigneraie
18:00 CET	Borleteau (red card) 71'; Aquime 117'	Report	Alégué 111'	Stadium: Stade Claude Bétard; Attendance: 1,043; Referee: Yohan Gagnant

==== Group 7E ====
17 November 2018	FC Saint-Lô Manche (5)	0–1	AS Vitré (4)	Saint-Lô
18:00 CET		Report	Laurent 45+1'	Stadium: Stade Louis Villemer; Attendance: 1,090; Referee: Kevin Barbin

17 November 2018	AS Gamaches (6)	1–7	Le Havre (2)	Abbeville
18:30 CET	Robin 74'	Report	Bonnet 8', 27'; Thiaré 56', 64'; Assifuah 78'; Bazile 85'; Camara 90'	Stadium: Stade Paul Delique; Attendance: 2,100; Referee: Niel Alexandre Perreau

17 November 2018	AG Caennaise (6)	0–2	Orléans (2)	Caen
18:00 CET		Report	Perrin 74'; El Khoumisti 77'	Stadium: Stade de Venoix; Attendance: 880; Referee: Stephanie Frappart

17 November 2018	SC Bastia (5)	2–1	Le Mans FC (3)	Furiani
20:00 CET	Santelli 15', 70' (pen.)	Report	Diarra 6'	Stadium: Stade Armand Cesari; Attendance: 5,117; Referee: Sylvain Palhies

18 November 2018	Grand-Quevilly FC (6)	4–1	AS Cherbourg Football (5)	Le Grand-Quevilly
14:00 CET	Sidibé 5'; Armaoui 66'; Diack 77'; Hounkpati 87'	Report	Romaneli 25' (pen.); Hélaine (yellow card) 72' (yellow-red card) 89'	Stadium: Stade Chêne à Leu; Attendance: 437; Referee: Nicolas Wassouf

17 November 2018	AS Bourny Laval (6)	1–5	CMS Oissel (4)	Laval
14:00 CET	Kouhli 21'	Report	Dopuđ 17'; Ouadah 72'; Lemaitre 79' (pen.); Dia 83'; Tiago 88'	Stadium: Stade de la Croix des Landes; Attendance: 360; Referee: Jordan Riche

18 November 2018	ESC Longueau (7)	2–1	Blois Football 41 (4)	Longueau
14:00 CET	Finaz 16'; Vanpuywelde 45'	Report	Touncara 16'	Stadium: Stade Émile Noël; Attendance: 609; Referee: Anthony Ustaritz

18 November 2018	AS Villers Houlgate Côte Fleurie (8)	2–0	USON Mondeville (6)	Houlgate
14:00 CET	Rebut 8'; Thirouin 55'	Report		Stadium: Stade Roger Gardin; Attendance: 1,062; Referee: Quentin Meresse

==== Group 7F ====
16 November 2018	Valenciennes (2)	3–1	USL Dunkerque (3)	Valenciennes
18:00 CET	Mauricio 13' (pen.); Robail 25'; Roudet 61'	Report	Garita 10'	Stadium: Stade du Hainaut; Attendance: 1543; Referee: Bartolomeu Varela Teles

17 November 2018	FC Bastia-Borgo (4)	2–4	CS Sedan Ardennes (4)	Borgo
14:30 CET	Inzerillo 7'; Cropanese 72'	Report	Bekhechi 25', 30'; Jobava 52'; Aktas 89'	Stadium: Stade Paul Antoniotti; Attendance: 250; Referee: Mathieu Vernice

17 November 2018	Olympique Marcquois Football (5)	0–2	US Boulogne (3)	Marcq-en-Barœul
19:00 CET		Report	Duterte 11'; Maah 88'	Stadium: Stade Georges Niquet; Attendance: 727; Referee: Marc Michout

18 November 2018	AS Prix-lès-Mézières (6)	2–0	Saint-Amand FC (6)	Prix-lès-Mézières
14:00 CET	Molinari 7'; Thioune 69'	Report		Stadium: Stade de la Poterie; Attendance: 345; Referee: Joachim Caffe Pierson

18 November 2018	Wasquehal Football (6)	3–5	Olympique Saint-Quentin (5)	Wasquehal
14:00 CET	Kiaku 10'; Rezig 62'; Lounas 70'	Report	Sylla 7'; Jallow 48', 55'; Mourabit 65'; Cambrone 90+3'	Stadium: Complexe Sportif Lucien Montagne; Attendance: 374; Referee: Lyes Boukeroui

16 November 2018	Iris Club de Croix (4)	1–0	Paris FC (2)	Croix
18:00 CET	Mihoubi 90+4'	Report		Stadium: Stade Henri Seigneur; Attendance: 550; Referee: Thierry Bouille

17 November 2018	ASC Hazebrouck (8)	1–3 (a.e.t.)	US Gravelines (6)	Hazebrouck
18:00 CET	Fleuret 8'	Report	Decae 90'; Bruet 96', 114'	Stadium: Stade Auguste Damette; Attendance: 1,087; Referee: Loic Mouton

18 November 2018	AS Marck (6)	0–1 (a.e.t.)	US Saint-Omer (6)	Marck
14:00 CET		Report	Blanquart 102'	Stadium: Stade Jean-Claude Agneray; Attendance: 700; Referee: Damien Rossini

==== Group 7G ====
18 November 2018	US Vimy (6)	0–2	US Créteil-Lusitanos (4)	Vimy
14:30 CET		Report	Mountasser 45+1'; Baal 85'	Stadium: Stade de la Mine; Attendance: 662; Referee: Geoffrey Kubler

18 November 2018	CS Avion (6)	1–1 (a.e.t.) (5–4 p)	RC Épernay Champagne (5)	Avion
14:30 CET	Desprès 90+3'; Diane (yellow card) 64' (yellow-red card) 98'	Report	Evora Fortes 75'	Stadium: Stade François Blin; Attendance: 418; Referee: Mohamed Awaisse Akbar

18 November 2018	FCA Troyes (5)	1–1 (a.e.t.) (0–3 p)	Bourges Foot (5)	Saint-André-les-Vergers
14:00 CET	Mezriche 38' (pen.) (red card) 60'; Lumbu (yellow card) 70' (yellow-red card) 85'	Report	Zabou 6'; Aajji (yellow card) 21' (yellow-red card) 70'; Keita (red card) 60'	Stadium: Complexe Sportif Jean Bianchi; Attendance: 422; Referee: Maxim Plat

17 November 2018	US Lusitanos Saint-Maur (4)	1–0 (a.e.t.)	JA Drancy (3)	Saint-Maur-des-Fossés
17:00 CET	Sylla 105'	Report	Diongue (yellow card) 85' (yellow-red card) 101'	Stadium: Stade Adolphe-Chéron; Attendance: 453; Referee: Emmanuel Caron

17 November 2018	AFC Compiègne (6)	0–2	Troyes (2)	Compiègne
18:00 CET	Diallo (yellow card) 29' (yellow-red card) 57'	Report	Ben Saada 55'; Touzghar 67'	Stadium: Stade Paul Cosyns; Attendance: 1,239; Referee: Mehdi Mokhtari

18 November 2018	CAS Escaudœuvres (7)	1–3	RCS La Chapelle (6)	Escaudœuvres
14:00 CET	Fortini 2'	Report	Diarra 15', 71'; Bihi 62'	Stadium: Stade Municipal Marceau Dhordain; Attendance: 892; Referee: Cyril Dell Angela

18 November 2018	AS du Pays Neslois (6)	0–0 (a.e.t.) (5–4 p)	FC Chambly (3)	Nesle
14:00 CET		Report		Stadium: Stade Éloi Auffève; Attendance: 808; Referee: Clément Fabry

17 November 2018	US Nogent (6)	0–2	Lens (2)	Beauvais
19:00 CET		Report	Chouiar 45+1', 47'	Stadium: Stade Pierre Brisson; Attendance: 2,312; Referee: Pierre Legat

==== Group 7H ====
18 November 2018	US Raon-l'Étape (5)	1–0	Bourg-en-Bresse (3)	Raon-l'Étape
14:00 CET	Duminy 6'	Report		Stadium: Stade Paul-Gasser; Attendance: 434; Referee: Antoine Valnet

18 November 2018	ES Heillecourt (7)	0–3	FC Saint-Louis Neuweg (5)	Heillecourt
14:00 CET		Report	Diallo 50', 77', 90'	Stadium: Stade de l'Embanie; Attendance: 366; Referee: Marc Bollengier

17 November 2018	FCSR Haguenau (4)	3–4 (a.e.t.)	Sochaux (2)	Haguenau
15:00 CET	Weissbeck 45+1'; Giesi 89'; Solvet 90+3'; Falk (red card) 108'	Report	Robinet 22'; Tope 58'; Sané 85'; Moltenis 104'	Stadium: Parc des Sports; Attendance: 579; Referee: Gael Angoula

18 November 2018	FC Rossfeld (8)	0–2	ASC Biesheim (5)	Erstein
14:00 CET		Report	Viana 13'; Efondja 16'	Stadium: Stade Municipal; Attendance: 589; Referee: Christopher Galek

18 November 2018	Sarreguemines FC (5)	1–1 (a.e.t.) (1–4 p)	Metz (2)	Sarreguemines
14:00 CET	Simpara 64'	Report	Niane 45+1' (pen.)	Stadium: Stade de la Blies; Attendance: 2307; Referee: Mickaël Leleu

17 November 2018	US Avize-Grauves (7)	0–1	SC Schiltigheim (4)	Épernay
15:00 CET		Report	Genghini 74' (pen.)	Stadium: Stade Paul Chandon; Attendance: 720; Referee: Valentin Ougier

18 November 2018	Olympique Strasbourg (7)	4–1	US Reipertswiller (6)	Strasbourg
14:00 CET	Diallo 10'; Settou 18', 70'; Sidow 90'	Report	Ballis 87'	Stadium: Stade de Cronenbourg; Attendance: 217; Referee: Ali Djedid

18 November 2018	FA Illkirch Graffenstaden (6)	3–0	Étoile Naborienne St Avold (6)	Illkirch-Graffenstaden
14:00 CET	Kayser 18', 60'; Schall 71'	Report	Saker (yellow card) 21' (yellow-red card) 53'; Babit (yellow card) 56' (red card) 56'; Bnou Marzouk (yellow card) 57' (red card) 57'	Stadium: Stade Albert Schweitzer; Attendance: 283; Referee: Philippe Lucas

==== Group 7I ====
17 November 2018	FC Montceau Bourgogne (5)	1–4	AS Lyon-Duchère (3)	Montceau-les-Mines
18:00 CET	Gouliat 36'	Report	Julienne 2'; Tuta 41' (pen.); Gradai 53', 70'	Stadium: Stade des Alouettes; Attendance: 555; Referee: Ahmed Taleb

18 November 2018	US Annecy-le-Vieux (7)	2–1	FC Val Lyonnais (8)	Annecy-le-Vieux
14:00 CET	Sylvestre-Brac 72'; Benzekri-Benallou 90+3'	Report	Leterre (red card) 74'; Badoil 90+1'	Stadium: Complexe Sportif d'Albigny; Attendance: 572; Referee: Nicolas Houguet

17 November 2018	ASF Andrézieux (4)	1–0	Louhans-Cuiseaux FC (5)	Andrézieux-Bouthéon
18:00 CET	Leonil 83'	Report		Stadium: L'Envol Stadium; Attendance: 339; Referee: Maxime Apruzzese

17 November 2018	Annecy FC (4)	0–1	Nancy (2)	Annecy
18:00	Cianci (red card) 45'	Report	Busin 2'	Stadium: Parc des Sports; Attendance: 2,330; Referee: Arnaud Baert

17 November 2018	AS Beaune (7)	0–3	Grenoble (2)	Beaune
19:00 CET		Report	Taravel 29'; Delétraz 58'; Chergui 90+3'	Stadium: Stade du Château de Vignoles; Attendance: 820; Referee: Abdelatif Kherradji

18 November 2018	US Feillens (7)	0–4	FC Limonest Saint-Didier (5)	Feillens
14:00 CET		Report	Gillez 37'; Ertek 42'; Chauve 60'; Simon 90+4'	Stadium: Complexe Sportif des Dîmes; Attendance: 969; Referee: Louis Lungeri

17 November 2018	US Cheminots Paray (6)	1–0	FC Morteau-Montlebon (5)	Paray-le-Monial
18:00 CET	Perianayagom (yellow card) 22' (yellow-red card) 50'; Boullet 88'	Report		Stadium: Stade des Sables; Attendance: 518; Referee: Edgar Barenton

==== Group 7J ====
17 November 2018	Angoulême CFC (5)	1–0	Auxerre (2)	Angoulême
19:00 CET	Mogès 35'	Report		Stadium: Stade Lebon; Attendance: 1,855; Referee: Sofien Benchabane

18 November 2018	Noisy-le-Grand FC (6)	1–0 (a.e.t.)	FC Riom (6)	Noisy-le-Grand
14:00 CET	Moutapam 110'	Report		Stadium: Stade des Bords de Marne; Attendance: 626; Referee: Gaetan Korbas

17 November 2018	FC Gueugnon (5)	1–3 (a.e.t.)	Clermont (2)	Gueugnon
19:30 CET	Revuelta 41'	Report	Iglesias 11'; Honorat 103'; Ayé 120'	Stadium: Stade Jean Laville; Attendance: 1,055; Referee: Floris Aubin

17 November 2018	CS Volvic (6)	0–0 (a.e.t.) (1–4 p)	Le Puy Foot 43 Auvergne (4)	Volvic
17:00 CET		Report		Stadium: Stade Michel Champleboux; Attendance: 601; Referee: Robin Chapapria

18 November 2018	FC Melun (6)	0–2	FC Chamalières (5)	Melun
14:00 CET		Report	Colo 41'; Benbachir 81'	Stadium: Stade Municipal de Melun; Attendance: 289; Referee: Valentin Giorgetti

17 November 2018	Limoges FC (5)	0–1 (a.e.t.)	FC Villefranche (3)	Limoges
15:30 CET		Report	Camelo (yellow card) 79' (yellow-red card) 100'; Mahdar 117'	Stadium: Stade Saint-Lazare; Attendance: 725; Referee: Romain Galibert

18 November 2018	AS Carrières Grésillons (9)	1–2	US La Charité (5)	Poissy
14:00 CET	Rivière 68'	Report	Pasdeloup 70'; Ouled 76'	Stadium: Stade Léo Lagrange; Attendance: 1,100; Referee: Tawbane Kani

17 November 2018	Montluçon Football (5)	0–1	ES Viry-Châtillon (6)	Montluçon
19:00 CET		Report	Mbimbe-Doumbe 81'	Stadium: Stade Dunlop; Attendance: 1,757; Referee: Yohann Cavailles

== Eighth round ==
The draw for the eighth round was made in two parts. First the remaining overseas team was drawn against opponents from the French League structure who had applied to potentially travel overseas. The overseas team, Aiglon du Lamentin, played at home due to playing their seventh round match away from home. The main draw took place later in the day. Both draws took place on 20 November 2018.

=== Overseas draw ===
8 December 2018	Aiglon du Lamentin (Martinique)	3–2	Sainte-Geneviève Sports (4)	Le Lamentin, Martinique
14:45 ECT	Goron 32'; Rochambeau 65'; Berdix 90+4' (pen.)	Report	Fumu Tamuso 69'; Traoré 88'; Coulibaly (red card) 90'; Monteiro (red card) 90'	Stadium: Stade Georges Gratiant; Attendance: 400; Referee: Guy Gregory Prevot

=== Main draw ===
As in previous editions of the competition, the main draw was split into 6 regional groups, with the split primarily ensuring an equal distribution of clubs from the different tiers, and secondarily grouping by geography. The lowest ranked teams remaining in the competition at this stage were Entente Crest-Aouste and AS Villers Houlgate Côte Fleurie both from tier 8 (Regional League 3).

Matches took place on 8 and 9 December 2018, with three matches postponed until the following weekend.

==== Group 8A ====
8 December 2018	ES Viry-Châtillon (6)	4–2 (a.e.t.)	Angoulême CFC (5)	Viry-Châtillon
17:30 CET	Karagiannis 17'; Bensaidi 90+3'; N'Goyi 101'; Magloire Mbimbe-Doumbe 105'	Report	Alouache 56'; Franco 75'; Negrit (red card) 90+4'	Stadium: Stade Henri Longuet; Attendance: 193; Referee: Ali Djedid

8 December 2018	USSA Vertou (5)	1–3	Bergerac Périgord FC (4)	Vertou
18:00 CET	Lempereur 62'; Bethys (red card) 87'	Report	Badin 40'; Sarr 53'; Chevalier 88'	Stadium: Stade des Échalonnières; Attendance: 578; Referee: Paul Garo

9 December 2018	FC Challans (5)	0–1	Niort (2)	Challans
15:00 CET		Report	Dona Ndoh 36'	Stadium: Stade Jean Léveillé; Attendance: 1,085; Referee: Yohan Gagnant

8 December 2018	Châteauroux (2)	4–0	Pau FC (3)	Châteauroux
18:00 CET	Barthelmé 23', 54', 77'; Livolant 68'	Report		Stadium: Stade Gaston Petit; Attendance: 886; Referee: Aurélien Petit

8 December 2018	Vendée Poiré-sur-Vie Football (7)	1–6	Les Herbiers VF (4)	Le Poiré-sur-Vie
18:00 CET	Paris 5'	Report	Pouye 10' (pen.), 68'; Amofa 58'; Charrier 73'; Montout 75'; Koutob 86'	Stadium: Stade de l'Idonnière; Attendance: 2,179; Referee: Matthieu Le Bris

8 December 2018	FC Sète 34 (4)	2–0	Rodez AF (3)	Sète
15:00 CET	Testud 4'; Orsattoni 79' (pen.)	Report		Stadium: Stade Louis Michel; Attendance: 716; Referee: Guillaume Janin

9 December 2018	Noisy-le-Grand FC (6)	2–1	US Lège Cap Ferret (5)	Noisy-le-Grand
13:30 CET	Christine 31'; Coulibaly 78'	Report	Dario 41' (pen.)	Stadium: Stade des Bords de Marne; Attendance: 443; Referee: Quentin Meresse

==== Group 8B ====
8 December 2018	FC Côte Bleue (5)	1–2	AS Lyon-Duchère (3)	Fos-sur-Mer
14:30 CET	Djaballah 76'	Report	Ndiaye 27'; Julienne 66'; Shiashia (red card) 76'; Seguin (red card) 81'	Stadium: Stade Parsemain; Attendance: 307; Referee: Sofien Benchabane

8 December 2018	Canet Roussillon FC (5)	4–2	Étoile Fréjus Saint-Raphaël (4)	Canet-en-Roussillon
18:00 CET	Delclos 35', 49'; Célina 40'; Pioton 77'	Report	Ouchmid 69'; Pinochi 81'	Stadium: Stade Saint-Michel; Attendance: 720; Referee: Valentin Ougier

8 December 2018	Hyères FC (4)	1–1 (a.e.t.) (1–3 p)	Grenoble (2)	Hyères
18:00 CET	Aléo (red card) 54'; Gomis 65'	Report	Spano 50'	Stadium: Stade Perruc; Attendance: 1,029; Referee: Alexandre Perreau Niel

9 December 2018	US Annecy-le-Vieux (7)	1–3	ASF Andrézieux (4)	Annecy-le-Vieux
13:30 CET	Yavuz (red card) 45+2'; Nefti 76'; Benzekri (yellow card) 27' (yellow-red card) 83'	Report	Desmartin 20', 47'; Milla 60'	Stadium: Complexe Sportif d'Albigny; Attendance: 562; Referee: Rémy Rasclard

8 December 2018	Stade Beaucairois (5)	0–2 (a.e.t.)	Gazélec Ajaccio (2)	Beaucaire
15:00 CET		Report	Perquis 105'; Roye 115'	Stadium: Stade Philibert Schneider; Attendance: 506; Referee: Nicolas Rodrigues

16 December 2018 (Note: The match between Entente Crest-Aouste and Le Puy Foot 43 Auvergne was originally scheduled for 8 December 2018, but was postponed due to the demonstrations by the Gilets Jaunes.)	Entente Crest-Aouste (8)	0–1	Le Puy Foot 43 Auvergne (4)	Le Pouzin
13:30 CET		Report	Vandam 20'	Stadium: Stade Émile Dupau; Attendance: 558; Referee: Cédric Mouysset

8 December 2018	Olympique Alès (5)	0–2	Marignane Gignac FC (3)	Alès
19:00 CET	Mouzaoui (red card) 65'	Report	Bru 27', 86'	Stadium: Stade Pierre Pibarot; Attendance: 1,126; Referee: Matthieu Bonnetin

==== Group 8C ====
8 December 2018	US Boulogne (3)	2–2 (a.e.t.) (2–3 p)	Iris Club de Croix (4)	Boulogne-sur-Mer
15:00 CET	Kraichi 62'; Diomandé 83'	Report	De Parmentier 75' (pen.), 81'	Stadium: Stade de la Libération; Attendance: 653; Referee: Bastien Dechepy

8 December 2018	CS Avion (6)	0–1	Red Star (2)	Avion
18:00 CET		Report	Derrien 88'	Stadium: Stade François Blin; Attendance: 1,306; Referee: Azzedine Souifi

8 December 2018	FC Versailles 78 (5)	2–4	Lens (2)	Versailles
13:30 CET	Abidi 8'; Chalali 44' (pen.); Mendy (yellow card) 52' (red card) 76'	Report	Mendy 16'; Bellegarde 24'; Kyei 62'; Bencharki 74'	Stadium: Stade de Montbauron; Attendance: 2,800; Referee: Romain Galibert

8 December 2018	L'Entente SSG (3)	1–0	CS Sedan Ardennes (4)	Saint-Gratien
17:00 CET	Farade 27'	Report		Stadium: Parc des Sports Michel Hidalgo; Attendance: 555; Referee: Joachim Caffe Pierson

9 December 2018	AS du Pays Neslois (6)	0–1	US Gravelines (6)	Nesle
13:30 CET		Report	Joveta 13'	Stadium: Stade Éloi Auffève; Attendance: 543; Referee: Geoffrey Kubler

15 December 2018 (Note: The match between SC Bastia and US Saint-Omer was originally scheduled for 9 December, but was postponed due to a red weather warning of high winds.)	SC Bastia (5)	3–1 (a.e.t.)	US Saint-Omer (6)	Furiani
20:00 CET	Schur 94'; Santelli 102'; Mesbah 112'	Report	Alvarez 120'	Stadium: Stade Armand Cesari; Attendance: 3,406; Referee: Alexandre Perreau Niel

9 December 2018	CMS Oissel (4)	0–1	Metz (2)	Oissel
13:30 CET		Report	Gakpa 31'	Stadium: Stade Marcel Billard; Attendance: 677; Referee: Marc Michout

9 December 2018	AS Prix-lès-Mézières (6)	3–3 (a.e.t.) (2–3 p)	Olympique Saint-Quentin (5)	Prix-lès-Mézières
13:30 CET	Houlot 47' (pen.); Thioune 87'; Leclerc 111'	Report	Sylla 38'; Niang 78'; Modeste 96'	Stadium: Stade de la Poterie; Attendance: 402; Referee: Valentin Giorgetti

==== Group 8D ====
9 December 2018	Vannes OC (4)	2–3	Brest (2)	Vannes
13:45 CET	Dufrennes 25' (pen.); Kikonda 45+1'	Report	Court 14'; Castelletto (red card) 24'; Mayi 31'; Butin 87' (pen.)	Stadium: Stade de la Rabine; Attendance: 1,800; Referee: Benjamin Lepaysant

8 December 2018	AS Villers Houlgate Côte Fleurie (8)	1–5	Le Havre (2)	Dives-sur-Mer
16:30 CET	Trégoat 5' (pen.)	Report	Gory 21'; Thiaré 27' (pen.), 52'; Fleury 70' (o.g.); Kadewere 85'	Stadium: Stade André Heurtematte; Attendance: 1,920; Referee: Emmanuel Esneu

9 December 2018	ESC Longueau (7)	2–1	Lannion FC (5)	Longueau
13:30 CET	Vanpuywelde 23'; Boquillon (red card) 61'; Bouvet 77'	Report	Le Houerou 58'	Stadium: Stade Émile Noël; Attendance: 521; Referee: Gaétan Korbas

8 December 2018	AS Vitré (4)	2–0	US Montagnarde (5)	Vitré
18:00 CET	Gros 31'; Elaz 60'	Report		Stadium: Stade Municipal; Attendance: 474; Referee: Alexis Brouard

8 December 2018	Stade Pontivyen (5)	1–0	US Avranches (3)	Pontivy
18:00 CET	Le Sauce 49'	Report		Stadium: Stade du Faubourg de Verdun; Attendance: 568; Referee: Marc Bollengier

8 December 2018	Grand-Quevilly FC (6)	1–2	GSI Pontivy (5)	Le Grand-Quevilly
18:00 CET	Sidibé 4'	Report	Pierre-Charles 47'; Jegú 58'	Stadium: Stade du Chêne à Leu; Attendance: 400; Referee: Mohamed Awaisse Akbar

8 December 2018	US Concarneau (3)	2–0	US Saint-Malo (4)	Concarneau
18:30 CET	Sinquin 7'; Damessi 78'	Report		Stadium: Stade Guy Piriou; Attendance: 2,117; Referee: Jordan Riche

==== Group 8E ====
9 December 2018	RCS La Chapelle (6)	0–1	FC Aurillac Arpajon Cantal (5)	La Chapelle-Saint-Luc
13:30 CET		Report	Jamin 39'	Stadium: Stade Pierre Vigeannel et Roger Hurluison; Attendance: 342; Referee: Loic Mouton

9 December 2018	US Créteil-Lusitanos (4)	1–1 (a.e.t.) (8–9 p)	FC Limonest Saint-Didier (5)	Créteil
14:30 CET	Fofana 90+4'	Report	Simon 30'	Stadium: Stade Dominique Duvauchelle; Attendance: 507; Referee: Maxim Plat

8 December 2018	FC Chamalières (5)	0–0 (a.e.t.) (0–3 p)	FC Villefranche (3)	Cournon-d'Auvergne
16:00 CET	Carmo (red card) 105'	Report		Stadium: Stade Joseph et Michel Gardet; Attendance: 489; Referee: Julien Schmitt

8 December 2018	US Cheminots Paray (6)	0–4	Orléans (2)	Paray-le-Monial
18:00 CET		Report	Perrin 21'; Avounou 49', 53'; El Khoumisti 86'	Stadium: Stade des Sables; Attendance: 1,206; Referee: Romain Zamo

8 December 2018	AF Bobigny (4)	0–2	Clermont (2)	Bobigny
17:00 CET		Report	Andriatsima 6'; Honorat 62'	Stadium: Stade Auguste Delaune; Attendance: 207; Referee: Kevin Barbin

14 December 2018 (Note: The match between US La Charité and Bourges Foot was originally scheduled for 9 December 2018, but was postponed due to the demonstrations by the Gilets Jaunes.)	US La Charité (5)	1–1 (a.e.t.) (1–3 p)	Bourges Foot (5)	Varennes-Vauzelles
20:00 CET	Ouled 12'	Report	N'Guessan 48' (pen.)	Stadium: Stade des Senets; Attendance: 1,391; Referee: Christopher Galek

8 December 2018	Saint-Pryvé Saint-Hilaire FC (4)	3–2	Troyes (2)	Saint-Pryvé-Saint-Mesmin
18:00 CET	Seidou 45+1'; Benaries 61'; Seye 81'	Report	Tinhan 77'; Touzghar 90+3'	Stadium: Stade du Grand Clos; Attendance: 498; Referee: Alexandre Mercier

==== Group 8F ====
8 December 2018	Besançon Football (5)	1–2	Tours FC (3)	Besançon
18:00 CET	Gueye 54'	Report	N'Nomo 59'; Carlier 90+2'	Stadium: Stade Léo Lagrange; Attendance: 604; Referee: Edgar Barenton

8 December 2018	FC Saint-Louis Neuweg (5)	0–2	Nancy (2)	Saint-Louis
17:00 CET		Report	Dalé 37'; Yao 45+1' (o.g.)	Stadium: Stade de la Frontière; Attendance: 618; Referee: Philippe Lucas

8 December 2018	SC Schiltigheim (4)	2–1	ASC Biesheim (5)	Schiltigheim
17:00 CET	Gasser 57'; Metzler 89'	Report	Fuchs 7'	Stadium: Stade de l'Aar; Attendance: 190; Referee: Maxime Apruzzese

8 December 2018	FA Illkirch Graffenstaden (6)	0–1	Sochaux (2)	Geispolsheim
17:00 CET		Report	Obadeyi 64'	Stadium: Stade Municipal; Attendance: 924; Referee: Alexandre Decoster

9 December 2018	ES Thaon (5)	3–6 (a.e.t.)	Valenciennes (2)	Capavenir-Vosges
15:00 CET	Samba 40'; Colin 46' (pen.); Gazagnes 74'; Evrard (red card) 105+2'	Report	Romil 13', 19'; Privat 16', 99'; Lucas Ribeiro 114'; Dos Santos 117'	Stadium: Stade Robert Sayer; Attendance: 774; Referee: Stéphanie Frappart

9 December 2018	Olympique Strasbourg (7)	1–0	SAS Épinal (4)	Strasbourg
13:30 CET	Sidow 28'	Report		Stadium: Stade de Cronenbourg; Attendance: 226; Referee: Tawbane Kani

8 December 2018	US Raon-l'Étape (5)	2–2 (a.e.t.) (3–2 p)	US Lusitanos Saint-Maur (4)	Raon-l'Étape
15:00 CET	Hassidou 29'; Duminy 86'	Report	Diaz 37' (pen.); Durbant 41' (yellow card) 29' (yellow-red card) 49'	Stadium: Stade Paul Gasser; Attendance: 610; Referee: Damien Rossini

== Round of 64 ==
The draw for the ninth round (known as the round of 64) took place on 10 December 2018. The 20 Ligue 1 teams joined the draw at this stage. The draw was split into four groups to ensure equal distribution of teams from each tier, with geographical proximity a secondary factor.

The lowest ranked teams remaining in the competition at this stage were Olympique Strasbourg and ESC Longueau both from tier 7 (Regional League 2). Olympique Strasbourg entered the competition in the first round, so had been in the competition longest.

Games were played on 4, 5, 6 and 7 January 2019.

=== Group 9A ===
5 January 2019	L'Entente SSG (3)	1–0	Montpellier (1)	Saint-Gratien
15:00 CET	Géran 90'	Report		Stadium: Parc des Sports Michel Hidalgo; Attendance: 3,557; Referee: Ruddy Buquet

5 January 2019	ES Viry-Châtillon (6)	1–0	Angers (1)	Viry-Châtillon
13:00 CET	Sacko 90'	Report		Stadium: Stade Henri Longuet; Attendance: 1,363; Referee: François Letexier

5 January 2019	Bergerac Périgord FC (4)	2–1	Niort (2)	Bergerac
15:00 CET	Bisson 17'; Belbachir 26'	Report	Grich 15'; Conté (yellow card) 53' (yellow-red card) 76'	Stadium: Stade Gaston-Simounet; Attendance: 1,533; Referee: Bartolomeu Varela

4 January 2019	Nantes (1)	4–1	Châteauroux (2)	Nantes
20:55 CET	Coulibaly 6'; Krhin 37'; Louza 70'; Limbombe 86'	Report	Sanganté 13'	Stadium: Stade de la Beaujoire; Attendance: 10,514; Referee: Jérémy Stinat

6 January 2019	Saint-Pryvé Saint-Hilaire FC (4)	3–1	FC Aurillac Arpajon Cantal (5)	Saint-Pryvé-Saint-Mesmin
17:15 CET	Seidou 2', 31'; Ouattara 45'	Report	Jamin 16'	Stadium: Stade du Grand Clos; Attendance: 720; Referee: Benjamin Lepaysant

5 January 2019	Red Star (2)	0–1	Caen (1)	Saint-Ouen
18:00 CET	Chantôme (red card) 53'	Report	Bammou 81'	Stadium: Stade Bauer; Attendance: 2,999; Referee: Johan Hamel

5 January 2019	Bourges Foot (5)	0–2	Lyon (1)	Bourges
20:55 CET		Report	Terrier 59'; Mendy 77'	Stadium: Stade Jacques Rimbault; Attendance: 8,187; Referee: Nicolas Rainville

5 January 2019	Orléans (2)	3–2 (a.e.t.)	(Martinique) Aiglon du Lamentin	Orléans
15:00 CET	Tell 28'; Perrin 105'; El Khoumisti 114'	Report	Banal 71'; Renault 113' (o.g.)	Stadium: Stade de la Source; Attendance: 4,459; Referee: Faouzi Benchabane

=== Group 9B ===
16 January 2019 (Note: The game between Grenoble and Strasbourg was originally scheduled for 4 January 2019, but was postponed due to a frozen pitch.)	Grenoble (2)	0–1 (a.e.t.)	Strasbourg (1)	Grenoble
19:15 CET		Report	Zohi 98'	Stadium: Stade des Alpes; Attendance: 7,553; Referee: Thomas Léonard

5 January 2019	US Gravelines (6)	0–3 (a.e.t.)	FC Villefranche (3)	Gravelines
18:00 CET		Report	Lacour (red card) 50'; Edimo 116'; Lemb 120+7'; Ndiaye 120+8'	Stadium: Stade des Huttes; Attendance: 1,671; Referee: Bastien Dechepy

5 January 2019	Amiens (1)	1–0	Valenciennes (2)	Amiens
15:00 CET	Timité 49'	Report		Stadium: Stade de la Licorne; Attendance: 4,158; Referee: Benoît Millot

5 January 2019	SC Schiltigheim (4)	1–3	Dijon (1)	Schiltigheim
18:00 CET	Genghini 77' (pen.)	Report	Sliti 64'; Kwon 72'; Tavares 90+2'	Stadium: Stade de l'Aar; Attendance: 1,604; Referee: Willy Delajod

5 January 2019	Olympique Saint-Quentin (5)	1–2 (a.e.t.)	Metz (2)	Saint-Quentin
18:00 CET	Cambrone 50'	Report	Cohade 45'; Balliu 101'	Stadium: Stade Paul Débrésie; Attendance: 3,844; Referee: Mikaël Lesage

5 January 2019	Iris Club de Croix (4)	2–0	US Raon-l'Étape (5)	Croix
13:00 CET	Carvalho (red card) 54'; Mihoubi 85'; Hassani 90+3'	Report	Bah (red card) 54'	Stadium: Stade Henri Seigneur; Attendance: 1,304; Referee: Alexandre Niel Perreau

7 January 2019	Lille (1)	1–0	Sochaux (2)	Villeneuve d'Ascq
20:55 CET	Luiz Araújo 40'	Report		Stadium: Stade Pierre-Mauroy; Attendance: 12,374; Referee: Florent Batta

6 January 2019	Olympique Strasbourg (7)	0–6	Saint-Étienne (1)	Strasbourg
17:15 CET		Report	Cabella 3', 86'; Perrin 9'; Khazri 46'; Diony 56'; Rocha 83'	Stadium: Stade de la Meinau; Attendance: 6,525; Referee: Stéphanie Frappart

=== Group 9C ===
6 January 2019	Canet Roussillon FC (5)	0–1	Monaco (1)	Perpignan
14:15 CET	Lopy (red card) 15'	Report	Sylla 2'	Stadium: Stade Gilbert Brutus; Attendance: 8,735; Referee: Ben El Hadj Salem

5 January 2019	Marignane Gignac FC (3)	1–1 (a.e.t.) (3–0 p)	Clermont (2)	Marignane
13:00 CET	Benhaim (red card) 27'; Barka 61'	Report	Honorat 45+4'	Stadium: Stade Saint-Exupéry; Attendance: 1,007; Referee: Pierre Gaillouste
	Penalties
	Civet (penalty scored); Assoumin (penalty scored); Parpeix (penalty scored)		(penalty missed) Pereira; (penalty missed) Andritsima; (penalty missed) Zaccarelli

6 January 2019	Noisy-le-Grand FC (6)	2–1	Gazélec Ajaccio (2)	Bonneuil-sur-Marne
17:15 CET	N'Doye 4' (o.g.); Issaad 43'	Report	Blayac 16'; Ba (red card) 41'	Stadium: Stade Léo Lagrange; Attendance: 2,600; Referee: Mehdi Mokhtari

5 January 2019	FC Sète 34 (4)	1–0	FC Limonest Saint-Didier (5)	Sète
18:00 CET	Diaby 80'	Report		Stadium: Stade Louis-Michel; Attendance: 1,248; Referee: Olivier Thual

5 January 2019	AS Lyon-Duchère (3)	3–0	Nîmes (1)	Lyon
15:00 CET	Mendes 13'; Julienne 80'; Ezikian 88'	Report		Stadium: Stade de Balmont; Attendance: 1,500; Referee: Clément Turpin

5 January 2019	Le Puy Foot 43 Auvergne (4)	0–1	Nancy (2)	Brives-Charensac
15:00 CET		Report	Moimbé 16'	Stadium: Stade Louis Exbrayat; Attendance: 1,526; Referee: Sylvain Palhies

6 January 2019	ASF Andrézieux (4)	2–0	Marseille (1)	Saint-Étienne
14:15 CET	Ngwabije 17'; Milla 82'	Report		Stadium: Stade Geoffroy-Guichard; Attendance: 13,313; Referee: Eric Wattellier

6 January 2019	Toulouse (1)	4–1	Nice (1)	Toulouse
17:15 CET	Diakité 40'; Gradel 45'; Dossevi 68'; García 84'	Report	Sacko 48'	Stadium: Stadium Municipal; Attendance: 7,979; Referee: Amaury Delerue

=== Group 9D ===
6 January 2019	ESC Longueau (7)	0–0 (a.e.t.) (1–4 p)	AS Vitré (4)	Amiens
17:15 CET		Report		Stadium: Stade Moulonguet; Attendance: 2,359; Referee: Romain Lissorgue

6 January 2019	GSI Pontivy (5)	0–4	Paris Saint-Germain (1)	Lorient
20:45 CET		Report	Jule 24' (o.g.); Neymar 70'; Mbappé 77' (pen.); Draxler 87'	Stadium: Stade du Moustoir; Attendance: 15,000; Referee: William Lavis

5 January 2019	Stade Pontivyen (5)	2–4	Guingamp (1)	Guingamp
15:00 CET	Marec 6'; Le Sauce 54' (pen.)	Report	Ngbakoto 15'; Roux 18'; Thuram 64', 67'	Stadium: Stade du Roudourou; Attendance: 7,966; Referee: Yohann Rouinsard

5 January 2019	Tours FC (3)	1–2	Les Herbiers VF (4)	Tours
13:00 CET	Boupendza 47'	Report	Pouye 6', 55'	Stadium: Stade de la Vallée du Cher; Attendance: 2,009; Referee: Aurélien Petit

6 January 2019	Bordeaux (1)	0–1	Le Havre (2)	Bordeaux
17:15 CET		Report	Assifuah 48'	Stadium: Matmut Atlantique; Attendance: 8,797; Referee: Jérôme Brisard

5 January 2019	SC Bastia (5)	2–2 (a.e.t.) (5–4 p)	US Concarneau (3)	Bastia
13:00 CET	Moretti 39'; Poggi 90+5'	Report	Toupin 21'; Gégousse 47'	Stadium: Stade Armand Cesari; Attendance: 3,680; Referee: Karim Abed
	Penalties
	Salis (penalty scored); Coulibaly (penalty scored); Guibert (penalty scored); Mesbah (penalty scored); Santelli (penalty missed); Bocognano (penalty scored)		(penalty scored) Le Joncour; (penalty scored) Gégousse; (penalty scored) Fleury; (penalty scored) Lagadec; (penalty missed) Guillou; (penalty missed) Salem-Ngabou

6 January 2019	Rennes (1)	2–2 (a.e.t.) (5–4 p)	Brest (2)	Rennes
14:15 CET	Hunou 41'; Sarr 49'	Report	Charbonnier 24', 39'	Stadium: Roazhon Park; Attendance: 12,554; Referee: Antony Gautier
	Penalties
	Poha (penalty missed); Del Castillo (penalty scored); Bourigeaud (penalty missed); Sarr (penalty scored); Siebatcheu (penalty scored); Da Silva (penalty scored); Zeffane (penalty scored)		(penalty scored) Chardonnet; (penalty scored) Belkebla; (penalty scored) Ayasse; (penalty missed) Diallo; (penalty missed) Butin; (penalty scored) Court; (penalty missed) Weber

6 January 2019	Reims (1)	2–0	Lens (2)	Reims
14:15 CET	Oudin 32'; Cafaro 36' (pen.)	Report		Stadium: Stade Auguste Delaune; Attendance: 8,232; Referee: Frank Schneider

== Round of 32 ==
The draw for the tenth round (known as the round of 32) took place on 7 January 2019. This was an open draw.

The lowest ranked teams remaining in the competition at this stage were Noisy-le-Grand FC and ES Viry-Châtillon, both from tier 6 (Regional League 1).

Games were played on 22, 23, 24 and 27 January 2019.

22 January 2019	FC Sète 34 (4)	0–1	Lille (1)	Sète
20:55 CET		Report	Bamba 48'	Stadium: Stade Louis Michel; Attendance: 2,805; Referee: Karim Abed

22 January 2019	Monaco (1)	1–3	Metz (2)	Monaco
20:55 CET	Falcao 40'	Report	Hein 32'; Gakpa 62'; Niane 74'	Stadium: Stade Louis II; Attendance: 600; Referee: Antony Gautier

24 January 2019	Amiens (1)	0–2	Lyon (1)	Amiens
21:00 CET		Report	Dembélé 28'; Dubois 35'; Marçal (red card) 45+2'	Stadium: Stade de la Licorne; Attendance: 6,647; Referee: Jérôme Brisard

23 January 2019	Saint-Étienne (1)	3–6	Dijon (1)	Saint-Étienne
18:30 CET	Diony 14'; Berić 60'; Monnet-Paquet 64'	Report	Sliti 11', 28', 50' (pen.); Keita 47'; Tavares 52'; Marié 90+2'	Stadium: Stade Geoffroy-Guichard; Attendance: 8,193; Referee: François Letexier

22 January 2019	Toulouse (1)	4–4 (a.e.t.) (4–3 p)	Reims (1)	Toulouse
18:30 CET	Leya Iseka 44', 82'; García 68'; Gradel 119' (pen.)	Report	Dia 47'; Oudin 77'; Chavalerin 87'; Cafaro 108'	Stadium: Stadium Municipal; Attendance: 6,652; Referee: Clément Turpin
	Penalties
	Dossevi (penalty scored); Sylla (penalty missed); Mubele (penalty scored); Leya Iseka (penalty scored); Gradel (penalty scored)		(penalty scored) Chavarría; (penalty missed) Chavalerin; (penalty scored) Fontaine; (penalty scored) Mbemba; (penalty missed) Cafaro

22 January 2019	Nancy (2)	1–2 (a.e.t.)	Guingamp (1)	Tomblaine
18:30 CET	N'Guessan 67'	Report	Rodelin 28'; Djilobodji 102'	Stadium: Stade Marcel Picot; Attendance: 4,000; Referee: Ruddy Buquet

24 January 2019	SC Bastia (5)	2–1	Noisy-le-Grand FC (6)	Furiani
18:00 CET	Moretti 35'; Mesbah 45'	Report	Yao 90+2'	Stadium: Stade Armand Cesari; Attendance: 4,986; Referee: Hakim Ben El Hadj

23 January 2019	Saint-Pryvé Saint-Hilaire FC (4)	0–2	Rennes (1)	Orléans
18:30 CET		Report	Siebatcheu 39'; Hunou 51'	Stadium: Stade de la Source; Attendance: 3,805; Referee: Benoît Millot

22 January 2019	ASF Andrézieux (4)	1–2	AS Lyon-Duchère (3)	Andrézieux-Bouthéon
18:30 CET	Leonil 15'	Report	Julienne 50', 63'	Stadium: L'Envol Stadium; Attendance: 4,196; Referee: Florent Batta

23 January 2019	Bergerac Périgord FC (4)	2–3 (a.e.t.)	Orléans (2)	Bergerac
18:30 CET	Pinto 89'; Gómez 90+4'	Report	Perrin 51'; Lopy 51'; D'Arpino 99'	Stadium: Stade Gaston-Simounet; Attendance: 2,546; Referee: Yohann Rouinsard

24 January 2019	AS Vitré (4)	3–0	Le Havre (2)	Vitré
18:00 CET	Le Bacle 33'; Sorin 47'; Elaz 57'	Report		Stadium: Stade Municipal; Attendance: 3,000; Referee: Willy Delajod

23 January 2019	ES Viry-Châtillon (6)	0–6	Caen (1)	Viry-Châtillon
18:30 CET		Report	Bammou 4'; Khaoui 12', 30'; Tchokounté 79'; Mbengue 88'; Mouaddib 90'	Stadium: Stade Henri Longuet; Attendance: 2,725; Referee: Bartolomeu Varela

23 January 2019	Paris Saint-Germain (1)	2–0	Strasbourg (1)	Paris
21:05 CET	Cavani 4'; Di María 80'	Report		Stadium: Parc des Princes; Attendance: 46,960; Referee: Johan Hamel

2 February 2019 (Note: Match originally scheduled for 22 January 2019, but postponed by one day due to the rearrangement of the Ligue 1 match between Angers and Nantes and then further postponed to 27 January due to the incident involving Emiliano Sala. It was postponed for a third time to 2 February as repairs to a temporary stand at the stadium had not been completed in time due to inclement weather.)	L'Entente SSG (3)	0–1	Nantes (1)	Saint-Gratien
16:30 CET		Report	Coulibaly 73'	Stadium: Parc des Sports Michel Hidalgo; Attendance: 5,000; Referee: Mikael Lesage

22 January 2019	FC Villefranche (3)	2–0	Les Herbiers VF (4)	Villefranche-sur-Saône
18:30 CET	Toko 63'; Labeau 90+4'	Report		Stadium: Stade Armand Chouffet; Attendance: 2,206; Referee: William Lavis

23 January 2019	Marignane Gignac FC (3)	0–0 (a.e.t.) (3–4 p)	Iris Club de Croix (4)	Marignane
18:30 CET		Report		Stadium: Stade Saint-Exupéry; Attendance: 1,200; Referee: Eric Wattellier

== Round of 16 ==
The draw for the eleventh round (known as the round of 16) took place on 24 January 2019. This was an open draw.

The lowest ranked team remaining in the competition at this stage was SC Bastia, from tier 5 (Championnat National 3).

Games were played on 5, 6 and 7 February 2019.

7 February 2019	Guingamp (1)	1–2	Lyon (1)	Guingamp
21:00 CET	A. Mendy 88'	Report	Dembélé 7'; Cornet 49'	Stadium: Stade de Roudourou; Attendance: 8,768; Referee: Frank Schneider

5 February 2019	SC Bastia (5)	2–2 (a.e.t.) (3–5 p)	Caen (1)	Furiani
21:00 CET	Poggi 70'; Santelli 117'	Report	Tchokounté 4'; Ninga 95'	Stadium: Stade Armand Cesari; Attendance: 10,003; Referee: Benoît Bastien
	Penalties
	Guibert (penalty scored); Coulibaly (penalty scored); Schur (penalty scored); Kifouéti (penalty missed)		(penalty scored) Fajr; (penalty scored) Djiku; (penalty scored) Diomandé; (penalty scored) Ninga; (penalty scored) Tchokounté

5 February 2019	Iris Club de Croix (4)	0–3	Dijon (1)	Croix
18:30 CET	Dia (red card) 4'	Report	Tavares 6' (pen.); Balmont 27'; Saïd 90+3'	Stadium: Stade Henri Seigneur; Attendance: 2,500; Referee: Olivier Thual

5 February 2019	Metz (2)	0–1	Orléans (2)	Metz
18:30 CET		Report	Lecoeuche 20' (pen.)	Stadium: Stade Saint-Symphorien; Attendance: 3,200; Referee: Hakim Ben El Hadj

6 February 2019	FC Villefranche (3)	0–3 (a.e.t.)	Paris Saint-Germain (1)	Décines-Charpieu
18:30 CET		Report	Draxler 102'; Diaby 113'; Cavani 119'	Stadium: Parc Olympique Lyonnais; Attendance: 22,858; Referee: Antony Gautier

5 February 2019	Nantes (1)	2–0	Toulouse (1)	Nantes
18:30 CET	Coulibaly 8'; Limbombe 41'	Report		Stadium: Stade de la Beaujoire; Attendance: 9,141; Referee: Jérôme Miguelgorry

6 February 2019	AS Vitré (4)	3–2	AS Lyon-Duchère (3)	Vitré
18:30 CET	Gros 32'; Le Borgne 41'; Laurent 90+4' (pen.)	Report	Rivas 8', 22'	Stadium: Stade Municipal; Attendance: 3,500; Referee: Amaury Delerue

6 February 2019	Rennes (1)	2–1	Lille (1)	Rennes
21:05 CET	Siebatcheu 74', 90+1'	Report	Soumaoro (red card) 19'; Pépé 65'	Stadium: Roazhon Park; Attendance: 7,228; Referee: Mikael Lesage

== Quarter-finals ==
The draw for the quarter-finals took place on 6 February 2019. This was an open draw.

The lowest ranked team remaining in the competition at this stage was AS Vitré from tier 4 (Championnat National 2).

Games were played on 26 and 27 February and 6 March 2019.

6 March 2019	AS Vitré (4)	0–2	Nantes (1)	Laval
18:30 CET		Report	Boschilia 25'; Mance 44'	Stadium: Stade Francis Le Basser; Attendance: 11,086; Referee: Karim Abed

26 February 2019	Paris Saint-Germain (1)	3–0	Dijon (1)	Paris
21:00 CET	Di María 8', 28'; Meunier 76'	Report		Stadium: Parc des Princes; Attendance: 43,000; Referee: Frank Schneider

27 February 2019	Rennes (1)	2–0	US Orléans (2)	Rennes
18:30 CET	Bourigeaud 65'; Niang 71'	Report		Stadium: Roazhon Park; Attendance: 9,357; Referee: Amaury Delerue

27 February 2019	Lyon (1)	3–1	Caen (1)	Décines-Charpieu
21:00 CET	Denayer 26'; Cornet 49'; Depay 84'	Report	Ninga 78'	Stadium: Parc Olympique Lyonnais; Attendance: 27,493; Referee: Ruddy Buquet

== Semi-finals ==
The draw for the semi-finals took place on 28 February 2019. This was an open draw.

Games were played on 2 and 3 April 2019.

2 April 2019	Lyon (1)	2–3	Rennes (1)	Décines-Charpieu
21:10 CEST	Traoré 47'; Dembélé 75' (pen.)	Report	Niang 40'; André 55'; Bensebaini 81'	Stadium: Parc Olympique Lyonnais; Attendance: 47,195; Referee: Benoît Bastien

3 April 2019	Paris Saint-Germain (1)	3–0	Nantes (1)	Paris
21:00 CEST	Verratti 29'; Mbappé 85' (pen.); Dani Alves 90+2'	Report		Stadium: Parc des Princes; Attendance: 45,000; Referee: François Letexier

== Final ==
27 April 2019
21:00 CEST

Rennes	2–2 (a.e.t.)	Paris Saint-Germain
Kimpembe 40' (o.g.); Mexer 66'	Report	Dani Alves 13'; Neymar 21'
Penalties
Niang (penalty scored); Ben Arfa (penalty scored); Grenier (penalty scored); Léa Siliki (penalty scored); Bensebaini (penalty scored); Sarr (penalty scored)	6–5	(penalty scored) Cavani; (penalty scored) Dani Alves; (penalty scored) Paredes; (penalty scored) Bernat; (penalty scored) Neymar; (penalty missed) Nkunku

Stade de France, Saint-Denis
Attendance: 75,000
Referee: Ruddy Buquet
