= 2011–12 Coupe de la Ligue =

French League Cup

Tournament details
- Country: France
- Teams: 42

Final positions
- Champions: Marseille (3rd title)
- Runners-up: Lyon

Tournament statistics
- Matches played: 41
- Goals scored: 127 (3.1 per match)
- Top goal scorer: Loïc Rémy (4 goals)

The 2011–12 Coupe de la Ligue was the 18th edition of the French league cup competition. The defending champions were Marseille, who defeated Montpellier 1–0 in the 2010–11 edition of the final. The competition was organized by the Ligue de Football Professionnel and open to the 42 professional clubs in France that are managed by the organization. The final was contested on 14 April 2012 at the Stade de France. The winner of the competition will qualify for the 2012–13 UEFA Europa League and be inserted into the third qualifying round.

== Calendar ==
Round	First match date	Fixtures	Clubs
First Round	22 July 2011	12	44 → 32
Second Round	9 August 2011	6	32 → 26
Third Round	30 August 2011	10	26 → 16
Round of 16	25 October 2011	8	16 → 8
Quarter-finals	10 January 2012	4	8 → 4
Semi-finals	31 January 2012	2	4 → 2
Final	14 April 2012	1	2 → 1

== First round ==
The draw for the opening round of the 2011–12 edition of the Coupe de la Ligue was completed on 24 June 2011. The first round featured 24 clubs; the four professional clubs in the Championnat National, the third division of French football, and the 20 clubs in Ligue 2. The matches were played on 22–23 July 2011. Strasbourg's and Grenoble's participation in the competition was previously in limbo. Strasbourg's participation was questionable because of the club's administrative relegation to the Championnat de France amateur, the fourth level of French football, which resulted in the loss of the club's professional status, while Grenoble underwent liquidation. On 12 July, the Ligue de Football Professionnel confirmed that, due to Grenoble's liquidation, the club would not participate in the Coupe de la Ligue. As a result of the announcement, Châteauroux, Grenoble first round combatants, were automatically inserted into the second round. A week later, a similar ruling was made in the case of Strasbourg, who, as a result of its demotion to the fourth division, lost its professional status. Boulougne-sur-Mer, Strasbourg's first round opponent, were shifted to the second round.

22 July 2011	Amiens	2–0	Nîmes	Amiens
20:00 CET	Ielsch 16'; Bazile 36'	Report		Stadium: Stade de la Licorne; Referee: Didier Falcone (Méditerranée)

22 July 2011	Vannes	2–1 (a.e.t.)	Troyes	Vannes
20:00 CET	N'Diaye 61'; Jarsalé 110'	Report	Bettiol 19'	Stadium: Stade de la Rabine; Attendance: 1,462; Referee: Abdelali Chaoui (Languedoc-Roussillon)

22 July 2011	Le Mans	1–0	Arles-Avignon	Le Mans
20:00 CET	Cissé 2'	Report		Stadium: MMArena; Attendance: 6,309; Referee: Ludovic Rémy (Nord-Pas-de-Calais)

22 July 2011	Boulogne-sur-Mer	w/o (Note: Boulogne-sur-Mer won the tie and advanced to the second round due to Strasbourg losing its professional status as a result of its administrative relegation to the Championnat de France amateur.)	Strasbourg	Boulogne-sur-Mer
20:00 CET				Stadium: Stade de la Libération

22 July 2011	Lens	3–0	Clermont	Lens
20:00 CET	Baal 23'; Eduardo 73'; Sow 90+5'	Report		Stadium: Stade Félix Bollaert; Attendance: 15,645; Referee: Christian Guillard (Atlantique)

22 July 2011	Châteauroux	w/o (Note: Châteauroux won the tie and advanced to the second round due to Grenoble entering liquidation in July 2011, which resulted in the club losing its professional status.)	Grenoble	Châteauroux
20:00 CET				Stadium: Stade Gaston Petit

22 July 2011	Tours	2–1 (a.e.t.)	Angers	Tours
20:00 CET	Cardy 88'; Oniangue 105+1'	Report	Charbonnier 50' (pen.)	Stadium: Stade de la Vallée du Cher; Attendance: 3,605; Referee: Stéphane Jochem (Brittany)

22 July 2011	Reims	0–1 (a.e.t.)	Nantes	Reims
20:00 CET		Report	Raspentino 115'	Stadium: Stade Auguste Delaune II; Attendance: 5,919; Referee: Stéphane Djouzi (Méditerranée)

22 July 2011	Le Havre	5–4 (a.e.t.)	Metz	Le Havre
20:00 CET	Fanchone 43'; Mendes da Graca 48', 111' (pen.); Rivière 73'; Julienne 88'	Report	Duhamel 4'; Sakho 6', 47'; Pouye 19'	Stadium: Stade Jules Deschaseaux; Attendance: 3,787; Referee: Florent Batta (Méditerranée)

22 July 2011	Guingamp	2–0	Laval	Guingamp
20:00 CET	Giresse 34'; Alioui 77'	Report		Stadium: Stade du Roudourou; Attendance: 6,120; Referee: Olivier Husset (Centre)

22 July 2011	Istres	3–2	Bastia	Fos-sur-Mer
20:00 CET	Akrour 28' de Préville 58'; Dielna 88'	Report	Diallo 26'; Sans 29'	Stadium: Stade Parsemain; Attendance: 1,584; Referee: Hakim Ben El Hadj (Rhône-Alpes)

23 July 2011	Sedan	4–1	AS Monaco	Sedan
18:00 CET	Fauvergue 9', 50'; Gragnic 18'; Court 63'	Report	Adriano 67'	Stadium: Stade Louis Dugauguez; Attendance: 6,216; Referee: Amaury Delerue (Aquitaine)

== Second round ==
The draw for the second round of the 2011–12 edition of the Coupe de la Ligue was completed on 24 June 2011. The second round featured the 12 winners of the first round matches. The matches were played on 9 August 2011.

9 August 2011	Nantes	1–0 (a.e.t.)	Châteauroux	Nantes
20:00 CET	Vivian 120'	Report		Stadium: Stade de la Beaujoire; Attendance: 6,945; Referee: Amaury Delerue (Aquitaine)

9 August 2011	Boulogne-sur-Mer	1–2	Sedan	Boulogne-sur-Mer
20:00 CET	Allart 90'	Report	Le Bihan 13'; Diallo 83'	Stadium: Stade de la Libération; Attendance: 4,411; Referee: Olivier Husset (Centre)

9 August 2011	Amiens	2–1	Le Havre	Amiens
20:00 CET	Zobiri 80'; Gavanon 90+3'	Report	François 65'	Stadium: Stade de la Licorne; Attendance: 2,863; Referee: William Lavis (Méditerranée)

9 August 2011	Guingamp	2–0	Vannes	Guingamp
20:00 CET	Knockaert 20', 76'	Report		Stadium: Stade du Roudourou; Attendance: 6,982; Referee: Thomas Leonard (Lorraine)

9 August 2011	Istres	0–2	Le Mans	Fos-sur-Mer
20:00 CET		Report	Zito 62'; Lamah 63'	Stadium: Stade Parsemain; Attendance: 1,474; Referee: Mikael Lesage (Lower Normandy)

9 August 2011	Lens	1–0	Tours	Lens
20:45 CET	Pollet 57' (pen.)	Report		Stadium: Stade Félix Bollaert; Attendance: 10,766; Referee: Didier Falcone (Méditerranée)

== Third round ==
The draw for the third round of the 2011–12 edition of the Coupe de la Ligue was completed on 11 August 2011. The third round featured the six winners of the second round matches, as well as the Ligue 1 clubs who were not playing in European competition this season. The matches were played on 30–31 August and 1 September 2011.

30 August 2011	Guingamp	2–3 (a.e.t.)	Lorient	Guingamp
18:30 CET	El-Jadeyaoui 11'; Charrier 31'	Report	Knockaert 28' (o.g.); Aliadière 84', 113'	Stadium: Stade du Roudourou; Attendance: 5,448; Referee: Sébastien Moreira (Franche-Comté)

30 August 2011	Nancy	1–2	Auxerre	Tomblaine
21:00 CET	Diakité 55'	Report	Le Tallec 50'; Kossoko 74'	Stadium: Stade Marcel Picot; Attendance: 6,086; Referee: Hervé Piccirillo (Méditerranée)

31 August 2011	Toulouse	1–2	Nice	Toulouse
18:00 CET	Beauguel 10'	Report	Civelli 36'; Mounier 47'	Stadium: Stadium Municipal; Attendance: 6,797; Referee: Philippe Malige (Languedoc-Roussillon)

31 August 2011	Le Mans	1–0	Ajaccio	Le Mans
20:00 CET	Ekeng-Ekeng 62'	Report		Stadium: MMArena; Attendance: 6,827; Referee: Benoît Millot (Île-de-France)

31 August 2011	Montpellier	2–2 (a.e.t.) (4–3 p)	Amiens	Montpellier
20:00 CET	Utaka 68'; Giroud 76'	Report	Puyo 11'; Gavanon 34' (pen.)	Stadium: Stade de la Mosson; Attendance: 6,179; Referee: Pascal Vileo (Aquitaine)
	Penalties
	Dernis (penalty missed); Saihi (penalty missed); Marveaux (penalty scored); Giroud (penalty scored); Yanga-Mbiwa (penalty scored); Pitau (penalty scored)		(penalty scored) Bazile; (penalty scored) Puyo; (penalty scored) Djaballah; (penalty missed) Cissé; (penalty missed) Gavanon; (penalty missed) Durimel

31 August 2011	Caen	3–2	Brest	Caen
20:00 CET	Fajr 35'; Hamouma 56'; Traoré 88'	Report	Roux 14', 79'	Stadium: Stade Michel d'Ornano; Attendance: 8,652; Referee: Alexandre Castro (Rhône-Alpes)

31 August 2011	Dijon	3–2	Valenciennes	Dijon
20:00 CET	Bauthéac 29' (pen.); Jovial 40'; Guerbert 52'	Report	Dossevi 34'; Pujol 51'	Stadium: Stade Gaston Gérard; Attendance: 6,872; Referee: Wilfried Bien (Rhône-Alpes)

31 August 2011	Sedan	2–0	Nantes	Sedan
20:00 CET	Boli 5'; Diallo 77'	Report		Stadium: Stade Louis Dugauguez; Attendance: 3,984; Referee: Bartolomeu Varela (Brittany)

31 August 2011	Saint-Étienne	3–1	Bordeaux	Saint-Étienne
20:45 CET	Olimpa 3' (o.g.); Sako 17'; Aubameyang 57'	Report	Trémoulinas 10'	Stadium: Stade Geoffroy-Guichard; Attendance: 14,647; Referee: Lionel Jaffredo (Brittany)

1 September 2011	Lens	1–0	Evian	Lens
20:00 CET	Toudic 78'	Report		Stadium: Stade Félix Bollaert; Attendance: 13,210; Referee: Philippe Kalt (Alsace)

== Round of 16 ==
The draw for the Round of 16 of the 2011–12 edition of the Coupe de la Ligue was completed on 6 September 2011. The round featured the ten winners of the third round matches, as well as the Ligue 1 clubs who were playing in European competition this season. The matches were played on 25–26 October 2011.

25 October 2011	Marseille	4–0	Lens	Marseille
20:45 CET	Gignac 14'; J. Ayew 68'; Rémy 82', 90'	Report		Stadium: Stade Vélodrome; Attendance: 17,972; Referee: Wilfried Bien (Rhône-Alpes)

26 October 2011	Dijon	3–2	Paris Saint-Germain	Dijon
17:00 CET	Sankharé 30'; Berenguer 32'; Jovial 61'	Report	Bahebeck 16'; Erdinç 20'	Stadium: Stade Gaston Gérard; Attendance: 10,115; Referee: Alexandre Castro (Rhône-Alpes)

26 October 2011	Montpellier	1–2	Lorient	Montpellier
18:45 CET	Giroud 65'	Report	Emeghara 14'; Campbell 69'	Stadium: Stade de la Mosson; Attendance: 4,787; Referee: Jean-Charles Cailleux (Picardy)

26 October 2011	Saint-Étienne	1–2	Lyon	Saint-Étienne
20:50 CET	Aubameyang 88'	Report	Briand 40'; Bastos 72' (pen.)	Stadium: Stade Geoffroy-Guichard; Attendance: 25,906; Referee: Clément Turpin (Bourgogne)

26 October 2011	Auxerre	1–2 (a.e.t.)	Caen	Auxerre
20:50 CET	Sahar 29'	Report	Nabab 24', 117'	Stadium: Stade de l'Abbé-Deschamps; Attendance: 7,628; Referee: Saïd Ennjimi (Centre-Ouest)

26 October 2011	Nice	2–1	Sochaux	Nice
20:50 CET	Pentecôte 39', 56'	Report	Camara 79'	Stadium: Stade du Ray; Attendance: 6,432; Referee: Hervé Piccirillo (Méditerranée)

26 October 2011	Lille	3–1	Sedan	Villeneuve-d'Ascq
20:50 CET	Pedretti 34'; Cole 39'; Jeleń 70'	Report	Diaby 80' (pen.)	Stadium: Stade Lille Métropole; Attendance: 17,016; Referee: Benoît Bastien (Lorraine)

26 October 2011	Le Mans	0–0 (a.e.t.) (4–1 p)	Rennes	Le Mans
20:50 CET		Report		Stadium: MMArena; Attendance: 13,210; Referee: Philippe Kalt (Alsace)
	Penalties
	Thomas (penalty scored); Momi (penalty scored); Narry (penalty scored); Strømstad (penalty scored)		(penalty missed) Hadji; (penalty scored) Féret; (penalty missed) Pitroipa

== Quarter-finals ==
The draw for the quarter-finals of the 2011–12 edition of the Coupe de la Ligue was completed on 26 October 2011. The round featured the eight winners of the Round of 16 matches. The matches were played on 10–11 January 2012.

10 January 2012	Caen	0–3	Marseille	Caen
20:45 CET		Report	Valbuena 7', 52'; Rémy 20'	Stadium: Stade Michel d'Ornano; Attendance: 15,674; Referee: Antony Gautier (Nord-Pas-de-Calais)

11 January 2012	Nice	3–3 (a.e.t.) (5–3 p)	Dijon	Nice
17:00 CET	Mounier 35'; Civelli 78'; Monzón 119'	Report	Guerbert 19'; Jovial 62'; Bauthéac 117' (pen.)	Stadium: Stade du Ray; Attendance: 7,751; Referee: Fredy Fautrel (Lower Normandy)
	Penalties
	Digard (penalty scored); Civelli (penalty scored); Gomis (penalty scored); Monzón (penalty scored); Mounier (penalty scored)		Marcq (penalty scored); Varrault (penalty scored); Corgnet (penalty scored); Sankharé (penalty missed)

11 January 2012	Le Mans	0–1	Lorient	Le Mans
18:45 CET		Report	Sunu 71'	Stadium: MMArena; Attendance: 7,183; Referee: Philippe Malige (Languedoc-Roussillon)

11 January 2012	Lyon	2−1	Lille	Lyon
20:50 CET	Källström 41'; López 66'	Report	Cole 28'	Stadium: Stade de Gerland; Attendance: 29,124; Referee: Laurent Duhamel (Upper Normandy)

== Semi-finals ==
The draw for the semi-finals of the 2011–12 edition of the Coupe de la Ligue was completed on 11 January 2012. The round will feature the four winners of the quarter-final matches. The matches were played on 31 January and 1 February 2012.

31 January 2012	Lorient	2–4 (a.e.t.)	Lyon	Lorient
20:45 CET	Emeghara 59'; Monnet-Paquet 68'	Report	Lacazette 80', 120+2'; Briand 90+4'; Gomis 102'	Stadium: Stade du Moustoir; Attendance: 14,610; Referee: Ruddy Buquet (Picardy)

1 February 2012	Marseille	2–1	Nice	Marseille
20:50 CET	Rémy 16'; Brandão 57'	Report	Mounier 44'	Stadium: Stade Vélodrome; Attendance: 12,567; Referee: Clément Turpin (Bourgogne)

== Final ==
14 April 2012
21:00 CEST

Lyon	0–1	Marseille
	Report	Brandão 105'

Stade de France, Saint-Denis
Attendance: 80,000
Referee: Stéphane Lannoy (Nord-Pas-de-Calais)

== Statistics ==
=== Top goalscorers ===
Rank	Player^{1}	Club	Goals
1	(France) **Loïc Rémy**	Marseille	4
2	(France) Olivier Giroud	Montpellier	2
2	(Gabon) Pierre-Emerick Aubameyang	Saint-Étienne	2
2	(Mali) Mamadou Diallo	Sedan	2
2	(France) Jérémie Aliadière	Lorient	2
2	(Senegal) Diafra Sakho	Metz	2
2	(France) Nolan Roux	Brest	2
2	(France) Nicolas Fauvergue	Sedan	2
2	(France) Anthony Knockaert	Guingamp	2
2	(France) Xavier Pentecôte	Nice	2

^{1}Players in bold are still active in the competition.

Last updated: 26 October 2011
Source: Official Goalscorers' Standings

== See also ==
- 2011–12 Ligue 1
- 2011–12 Ligue 2
- 2011–12 Championnat National
