= 2016–17 Championnat de France Amateur 2 =

Championnat de France Amateur 2
- Season: 2016–17
- Champions: Saint-Brieuc
- Promoted: (12 teams. See "Season outcomes" section)
- Relegated: (10 teams. See "Season outcomes" section)
- Top goalscorer: 19 goals Abdoulaye Diallo, Lozère; Vincent Créhin, Le Mans
- Biggest home win: 10–0 Aurillac v Île-Rousse; Group F, R16, 18 February 2017
- Biggest away win: 0–6 Toulon (res) v Nîmes (res); Group G, R24, 30 April 2017
- Highest scoring: 11 goals Le Mans 9–2 Tours (res); Group B, R26, 20 May 2017
- All statistics correct as of 12:00, 25 May 2017 (UTC).

The 2016–17 Championnat de France Amateur 2 will be the 19th season of the fifth tier in the French football league system in its current format. The competition will be contested by 112 clubs split geographically across 8 groups of 14 teams each. The teams include amateur clubs (although a few are semi-professional) and the reserve teams of professional clubs.

== Teams ==
On July 15, the FFF ratified the constitution of the competition, and published the groups as follows:

- 71 teams that finished in 3rd to 11th position in the 2015–16 Championnat de France Amateur 2 groups. The 72nd team, Châtellerault, were administratively relegated.
- 3 teams that finished in 2nd position in the 2015–16 Championnat de France Amateur 2 groups, but were the lowest ranked 2nd placed teams.
- 3 teams that finished in 12th position in the 2015–16 Championnat de France Amateur 2 groups, but were the highest ranked 12th placed teams.
- 8 teams relegated from 2015–16 Championnat de France amateur after any reprieves (Sarre-Union, Troyes reserves, Aubervilliers, Roye Noyon, Sochaux reserves, Bayonne, Bordeaux reserves and Stade Bordelais)
- 22 teams promoted from Regional Division d'Honneur (Lozère, Blois, Chamalières, Cozes, Créteil reserves, Avranches reserves, Fléchois, Furiani-Agliani, Grasse, Limonest, Louhans-Cuiseaux, Lunéville, Maubeuge, Ornans, Pau reserves, Prix-lès-Mézières, Quevilly reserves, Rodéo, Les Herbiers reserves, Senlisienne, Strasbourg Vauban and Vannes)
- 4 teams reprieved from relegation from 2015–16 Championnat de France Amateur 2 groups. (Angoulême, Aubagne, Tourcoing and Lannion)
- The reserve team of new club Sporting Club Toulon, formed by the merger of Toulon-Le Las and Toulon.

On 9 August, the FFF confirmed the decision by Évian TG not to participate in the CFA 2 with their reserve team following the club's recent receivership. Because the decision comes after 15 July, there will be no replacement and Group F will instead operate with 13 clubs.

=== Eligibility for Promotion ===
The reserve teams in CFA2 cannot obtain promotion if their centre de formation (equivalent to Academy) is deemed of insufficient quality. The following teams are not eligible for promotion from CFA2 this season:

Group A

- Angers (res)
- Brest (res)

Group B

- Avranches (res)
- Quevilly-Rouen (res)
- Tours (res)

Group C

- Amiens (res)
- Boulogne (res)
- Paris FC (res)

Group D

- RC Strasbourg (res)

Group E

- Créteil (res)
- Dijon (res)

Group F

- Clermont (res)

Group G

- AC Ajaccio (res)
- Toulon (res)

Group H

- Les Herbiers (res)
- Niort (res)
- Pau (res)

=== SU Divaise legal challenge ===
SU Divaise finished 1st in DH Basse-Normandie, but were denied promotion due to not having a youth team. However this ruling was successfully appealed, however the decision was not binding on the FFF.

On 20 September the Tribunal Administratif de Paris (Administrative Court of Paris) upheld the decision of the Comité National Olympique et Sportif Français that SU Divaise should be promoted to CFA 2. This ruling gave the FFF 10 days to place SU Divaise into a CFA 2 group.

On 21 September the FFF published a revision to CFA 2 Group F, including SU Divaise in the group.

== League tables ==
Group A
Pos	Team	Pld	W	D	L	GF	GA	GD	Pts	Promotion or relegation
1	Saint-Brieuc (P)	26	16	8	2	42	11	+31	56	Promotion to National 2
2	Angers (res)	26	13	8	5	38	23	+15	47	
3	Guingamp (res)	26	13	3	10	41	30	+11	42	
4	Dinan-Léhon	26	11	8	7	28	24	+4	41	
5	Vannes	26	12	4	10	45	44	+1	40	
6	Vertou	26	10	9	7	37	32	+5	39	
7	Laval (res)	26	9	8	9	38	34	+4	35	
8	Brest (res)	26	8	8	10	32	27	+5	32	
9	Sablé	26	7	10	9	31	34	−3	31	
10	TA Rennes	26	8	6	12	24	38	−14	30	
11	Changé	26	6	10	10	31	54	−23	28	
12	Lannion	26	7	7	12	28	40	−12	28	
13	La Flèche	26	5	8	13	23	37	−14	23	
14	Fougères (R)	26	3	11	12	31	41	−10	20	Relegation to Division d'Honneur

Source: FFF.fr
Rules for classification: 1) points; 2) head-to-head results; 3) head-to-head goal difference; 4) goal difference; 5) number of goals scored; 6) fair play points; 7) draw
(P) Promoted; (R) Relegated

Group B
Pos	Team	Pld	W	D	L	GF	GA	GD	Pts	Promotion or relegation
1	Saint-Pryvé (C, P)	26	17	4	5	54	24	+30	55	Promotion to National 2
2	Le Mans (P)	26	15	6	5	47	23	+24	51	Possible Promotion to National 2
3	Avoine Chinon	26	13	7	6	33	25	+8	46	
4	Oissel	26	11	9	6	44	36	+8	42	
5	Tours (res)	26	12	4	10	49	42	+7	40	
6	Aubervilliers	26	10	7	9	39	35	+4	37	
7	SM Caen (res) (Note: SM Caen reserves were penalised for an infringement in the game against UJAM Paris on 20 August 2016. The game originally finished 0–0. UJAM Paris were awarded a 3–0 victory and SM Caen were given an additional one point penalty.)	26	11	4	11	40	46	−6	36	
8	Blois	26	10	5	11	38	35	+3	35	
9	Dreux	26	7	8	11	28	42	−14	29	
10	Évreux	26	8	5	13	23	35	−12	29	
11	Bourges 18	26	8	3	15	31	39	−8	27	
12	Quevilly-Rouen (res)	26	5	10	11	26	39	−13	25	
13	Avranches (res)	26	6	7	13	36	49	−13	25	
14	UJAM Paris (R)	26	5	9	12	26	44	−18	24	Relegation to Division d'Honneur

Source: FFF.fr
Rules for classification: 1) points; 2) head-to-head results; 3) head-to-head goal difference; 4) goal difference; 5) number of goals scored; 6) fair play points; 7) draw
(C) Champions; (P) Promoted; (R) Relegated
Notes:

Group C
Pos	Team	Pld	W	D	L	GF	GA	GD	Pts	Promotion or relegation
1	Beauvais (C, P)	26	14	6	6	39	21	+18	48	Promotion to National 2
2	AS Saint-Ouen-l'Aumône	26	13	8	5	31	17	+14	47	
3	Amiens (res)	26	13	5	8	34	30	+4	44	
4	Feignies Aulnoye	26	12	6	8	36	28	+8	42	
5	Saint-Quentin	26	11	6	9	35	29	+6	39	
6	Grande-Synthe	26	10	8	8	32	32	0	38	
7	Tourcoing	26	10	8	8	25	24	+1	38	
8	Maubeuge	26	10	5	11	36	32	+4	35	
9	Boulogne (res)	26	10	3	13	35	41	−6	33	
10	Roye Noyon	26	8	8	10	25	26	−1	32	
11	Ailly-sur-Somme	26	7	7	12	30	36	−6	28	
12	Paris FC (res)	26	7	6	13	34	44	−10	27	
13	Senlis	26	5	10	11	23	41	−18	25	
14	Marck (R)	26	7	4	15	24	38	−14	25	Relegation to Division d'Honneur

Source: FFF.fr
Rules for classification: 1) points; 2) head-to-head results; 3) head-to-head goal difference; 4) goal difference; 5) number of goals scored; 6) fair play points; 7) draw
(C) Champions; (P) Promoted; (R) Relegated

Group D
Pos	Team	Pld	W	D	L	GF	GA	GD	Pts	Promotion or relegation
1	RC Strasbourg (res) (C)	26	17	3	6	46	21	+25	54	
2	Schiltigheim (P)	26	16	5	5	45	17	+28	53	Promotion to National 2
3	Haguenau	26	14	7	5	49	31	+18	49	
4	Sarreguemines	26	13	5	8	38	36	+2	44	
5	Metz (res)	26	10	9	7	39	30	+9	39	
6	Prix-lès-Mézières	26	11	5	10	41	38	+3	38	
7	Lunéville	26	10	8	8	36	36	0	38	
8	Sarre-Union	26	10	4	12	42	47	−5	34	
9	Nancy (res)	26	9	6	11	37	43	−6	33	
10	Biesheim	26	9	6	11	34	44	−10	33	
11	Pagny	26	5	10	11	26	34	−8	25	
12	Forbach (R)	26	7	3	16	26	49	−23	24	Possible Relegation to Division d'Honneur
13	Strasbourg Vauban (R)	26	5	8	13	26	37	−11	23	Possible Relegation to Division d'Honneur
14	Illzach (R)	26	3	7	16	34	56	−22	16	Relegation to Division d'Honneur

Source: FFF.fr
Rules for classification: 1) points; 2) head-to-head results; 3) head-to-head goal difference; 4) goal difference; 5) number of goals scored; 6) fair play points; 7) draw
(C) Champions; (P) Promoted; (R) Relegated

Group E
Pos	Team	Pld	W	D	L	GF	GA	GD	Pts	Promotion or relegation
1	Ste-Geneviève (C, P)	26	14	9	3	41	22	+19	51	Promotion to National 2
2	Pontarlier	26	13	9	4	39	22	+17	48	
3	Noisy-le-Sec	26	14	5	7	45	29	+16	47	
4	Créteil (res)	26	12	7	7	41	36	+5	43	
5	Gueugnon	26	10	10	6	36	28	+8	40	
6	Troyes (res)	26	10	8	8	36	27	+9	38	
7	Ivry	26	9	5	12	34	37	−3	32	
8	Dijon (res)	26	7	10	9	25	25	0	31	
9	Sochaux (res)	26	8	7	11	25	29	−4	31	
10	Selongey (Note: Selongey were deducted 6 points by the FFF on 8 March 2017 for failing to comply with FFF rules on youth teams. This was reduced to 3 points at an appeal in April 2017. The deduction was removed completely by the CNOSF in May 2017.)	26	9	3	14	23	44	−21	30	
11	Sénart-Moissy	26	7	7	12	31	40	−9	28	
12	Besançon	26	5	11	10	34	40	−6	26	
13	Racing Besançon	26	6	7	13	26	39	−13	25	
14	Ornans (R)	26	7	4	15	32	50	−18	25	Relegation to Division d'Honneur

Source: FFF.fr
Rules for classification: 1) points; 2) head-to-head results; 3) head-to-head goal difference; 4) goal difference; 5) number of goals scored; 6) fair play points; 7) draw
(C) Champions; (P) Promoted; (R) Relegated
Notes:

Group F
Pos	Team	Pld	W	D	L	GF	GA	GD	Pts	Promotion or relegation
1	Saint-Priest (C, P)	26	15	4	7	47	23	+24	49	Promotion to National 2
2	Saint-Étienne (res)	26	14	5	7	43	37	+6	47	
3	Lozère	26	13	7	6	49	38	+11	46	
4	Borgo	26	12	8	6	48	34	+14	44	
5	Bourgoin-Jallieu	26	13	5	8	52	41	+11	44	
6	Limonest	26	12	7	7	35	28	+7	43	
7	Aurillac	26	11	10	5	43	24	+19	43	
8	Louhans-Cuiseaux	26	12	5	9	44	42	+2	41	
9	Clermont (res)	26	10	6	10	37	26	+11	36	
10	Bastia (res)	26	9	6	11	35	44	−9	33	
11	Dives-Cabourg (Note: Dives-Cabourg were penalised for fielding a suspended player in the game against Bastia (res) on 15 October 2016. The original scoreline was 2–3. The result was amended to 0–3 and Dives-Cabourg were deducted 1 point.)	26	6	9	11	33	41	−8	26	
12	Île-Rousse	26	3	7	16	21	54	−33	16	
13	Chamalières	26	3	7	16	24	49	−25	16	
14	Cournon (R)	26	3	6	17	30	60	−30	15	Relegation to Division d'Honneur

Source: FFF.fr
Rules for classification: 1) points; 2) head-to-head results; 3) head-to-head goal difference; 4) goal difference; 5) number of goals scored; 6) fair play points; 7) draw
(C) Champions; (P) Promoted; (R) Relegated
Notes:

Group G
Pos	Team	Pld	W	D	L	GF	GA	GD	Pts	Promotion or relegation
1	Grasse (C, P)	26	15	5	6	40	28	+12	50	Promotion to National 2
2	Furiani-Agliani (P)	26	14	6	6	35	29	+6	48	Possible Promotion to National 2
3	Aubagne	26	12	9	5	36	19	+17	45	
4	Balma	26	12	8	6	44	35	+9	44	
5	Rodéo	26	12	6	8	51	35	+16	42	
6	Cannet	26	13	2	11	47	29	+18	41	
7	Nîmes (res)	26	10	5	11	34	40	−6	35	
8	AC Ajaccio (res)	26	9	7	10	43	44	−1	34	
9	Fabrègues	26	7	12	7	36	35	+1	33	
10	Alès	26	7	10	9	28	39	−11	31	
11	Toulouse (res)	26	8	5	13	30	34	−4	29	
12	Castanet	26	7	7	12	38	45	−7	28	
13	Agde	26	4	10	12	30	50	−20	22	
14	Toulon (res) (R)	26	3	6	17	25	55	−30	15	Relegation to Division d'Honneur

Source: FFF.fr
Rules for classification: 1) points; 2) head-to-head results; 3) head-to-head goal difference; 4) goal difference; 5) number of goals scored; 6) fair play points; 7) draw
(C) Champions; (P) Promoted; (R) Relegated

Group H
Pos	Team	Pld	W	D	L	GF	GA	GD	Pts	Promotion or relegation
1	Stade Bordelais (C, P)	26	14	9	3	42	22	+20	51	Promotion to National 2
2	Limoges (P)	26	13	10	3	45	18	+27	49	Possible Promotion to National 2
3	Anglet	26	12	9	5	37	21	+16	45	
4	Bordeaux (res)	26	12	8	6	44	30	+14	44	
5	Niort (res)	26	11	9	6	41	25	+16	42	
6	Angoulême	26	11	7	8	39	38	+1	40	
7	Bressuire	26	8	11	7	24	23	+1	35	
8	Pau (res)	26	7	11	8	26	31	−5	32	
9	Bayonne	26	7	9	10	27	28	−1	30	
10	La Roche	26	5	11	10	29	44	−15	26	
11	Lège Cap Ferret	26	5	7	14	27	43	−16	22	
12	Les Herbiers (res)	26	3	11	12	28	49	−21	20	
13	Cozes (Note: Cozes were deducted 6 points by the FFF on 8 March 2017 for failing to comply with FFF rules on youth teams. This was reduced to 3 points at an appeal in April 2017.)	26	4	11	11	24	42	−18	20	
14	Marmande (R)	26	3	11	12	23	42	−19	20	Relegation to Division d'Honneur

Source: FFF.fr
Rules for classification: 1) points; 2) head-to-head results; 3) head-to-head goal difference; 4) goal difference; 5) number of goals scored; 6) fair play points; 7) draw
(C) Champions; (P) Promoted; (R) Relegated

== Season outcomes ==
Outcomes below are provisional and subject to ratification by the FFF.

=== Champions and promotion ===
Saint-Brieuc, Saint-Pryvé, Beauvais, Ste-Geneviève, Saint-Priest, Grasse, and Stade Bordelais are promoted to National 2 as champions of their respective groups.

Schiltigheim are promoted after finishing second in Group B, as champions RC Strasbourg reserves are ineligible for promotion.

Le Mans, AS Saint-Ouen-l'Aumône, Furiani-Agliani and Limoges are promoted, due to having the best record of the 2nd placed clubs against the top five teams eligible for promotion in their respective groups. AS Saint-Ouen-l'Aumône were subsequently denied promotion by the FFF.

Saint-Brieuc are champions of 2016–17 Championnat de France Amateur 2, due to having the best record of the four promoted sides against the teams finishing in 2nd to 6th in their respective groups.

=== Relegation ===
Fougères, UJAM Paris, Marck, Forbach, Illzach, Strasbourg Vauban, Ornans, Cournon, Toulon (res) and Marmande are relegated to their regional Division d'Honneur.

== Top scorers ==
As of end of season

Rank	Player	Club	Goals
1	Abdoulaye Diallo	Lozère	19
1	Vincent Créhin	Le Mans	19
3	Henry N'Dépo	Vannes	18
4	Kévin Cardinali	Castanet	17
4	Tristan Campeon	Grasse	17
4	Olivier Diedhiou	Saint-Pryvé	17
7	Cyril Giesi	Haguenau	16
7	Fabrice Seidou	Saint-Pryvé	16
9	Hicham Benkaid	RC Strasbourg (res)	15
9	Quentin Barcelo	Ste-Geneviève	15
9	Benjamin Genghini	Schiltigheim	15
9	Benjamin Betourné	Sénart-Moissy	15
9	Maxime Lemoine	Maubeuge	15
