= Gaoussou =

Gaoussou is both a given name and a surname. Notable people with the name include:

- Gaoussou Koné (born 1944), Ivorian sprinter
- Gaoussou Sackho (born 1995), French footballer
- Gaoussou Samaké (born 1997), Ivorian footballer
- Gaoussou Youssouf Siby (born 2000), Guinean footballer
- Gaoussou Traoré (born 1999), French footballer
- Bamba Gaoussou (born 1984), Ivorian footballer
