= Matthieu Guerbert =

French footballer (born 1992)

Personal information
- Full name: Matthieu Guerbert
- Date of birth: 20 March 1992 (age 34)
- Place of birth: Meaux, France
- Height: 1.77 m (5 ft 10 in)
- Position: Midfielder

Team information
- Current team: Colomiers
- Number: 12

Youth career
- 2004–2007: Toulouse Fontaines
- 2007–2010: Rodez

Senior career*
Years	Team	Apps	(Gls)
2010–2011	Rodez	1	(0)
2011–2012	Dijon B	20	(9)
2012–2013	Balma	12	(1)
2013–2020	Rodez	133	(11)
2020–2021	Gazélec Ajaccio	8	(0)
2021–	Colomiers	10	(0)
- * Club domestic league appearances and goals as of 15:42, 30 March 2022 (UTC)

Matthieu Guerbert (born 20 March 1992) is a French professional footballer who plays as midfielder for Championnat National 1 club Colomiers.

== Club career ==
Guerbert is a youth product of Rodez, and returned to them in 2013 after a couple of years in non-professional leagues. He made his professional debut with Rodez in a 2–0 Ligue 2 win over Auxerre on 26 July 2019.

In July 2020, Guerbert left Rodez and signed for Gazélec Ajaccio.

== Personal life ==
Guerbert is the younger brother of the footballer Thomas Guerbert.
