= Jérémy Lempereur =

French footballer (born 1987)

Personal information
- Full name: Jérémy Georges Henri Lempereur
- Date of birth: 29 November 1987 (age 38)
- Place of birth: Saint-Nazaire, France
- Height: 1.75 m (5 ft 9 in)
- Position: Attacking midfielder

Team information
- Current team: FC Rezé

Youth career
- Lens

Senior career*
Years	Team	Apps	(Gls)
2006–2008	Lens II	7	(0)
2008–2009	Albi	12	(0)
2009	Arras		
2009–2011	Alcorcón	51	(1)
2011	Leganés	0	(0)
2011–2012	Salamanca	29	(5)
2012	Tenerife	3	(0)
2013	La Louvière	12	(1)
2013–2014	Arras	22	(4)
2014–2015	WS Brussels	6	(0)
2015	Dender	2	(0)
2015	La Roche	18	(3)
2016	Luçon	0	(0)
2016–2017	Engordany		
2017	Santa Coloma		
2017–2018	Louhans-Cuiseaux	25	(2)
2018–2019	Vertou	8	(2)
2019–	FC Rezé		
- * Club domestic league appearances and goals as of 11:59, 6 December 2018 (UTC)

Jérémy Georges Henri Lempereur (born 29 November 1987) is a French footballer who plays as an attacking midfielder for FC Rezé.

== Club career ==
Lempereur was born in Saint-Nazaire, and was a RC Lens youth graduate. After representing the reserves, US Albi and Arras Football Association, he moved abroad in July 2009, after agreeing to a contract with Segunda División B side AD Alcorcón.

Lempereur helped the team promote to Segunda División, by appearing in 35 matches in all competitions, including 27 minutes in the Alcorconazo. He made his debut in the Spanish second level on 18 September, coming on as a second-half substitute for Samuel Baños in a 3–1 home win against Girona FC, and scored his first goal the following 17 April, by netting the equalizer in a 3–2 home defeat of CD Tenerife.

On 10 July 2011, Lempereur signed for CD Leganés in the third division. He left the club two days later, after alleging "personal problems", and after failed trials at Standard de Liège and former club Lens, he returned to Spain after joining UD Salamanca in the same division.

On 25 July 2012, Lempereur moved to fellow third division side Tenerife. After appearing rarely, he cut ties with the club, and signed with Belgian side UR La Louvière Centre on 30 December.

In the following four years, Lempereur featured only in the lower leagues of France and Belgium, representing Arras, RWS Bruxelles, FCV Dender EH, La Roche VF and Luçon FC. In August 2016, he switched teams and countries again, joining Andorra's UE Engordany.

On 15 June 2017, Lempereur joined FC Santa Coloma, but moved to Louhans-Cuiseaux FC shortly after.
