= Parc des Sports Michel Hidalgo =

Multi-use stadium in Sannois, France

Coordinates: 48°58′28.84″N 2°16′31.90″E

- Stade Michel Hidalgo
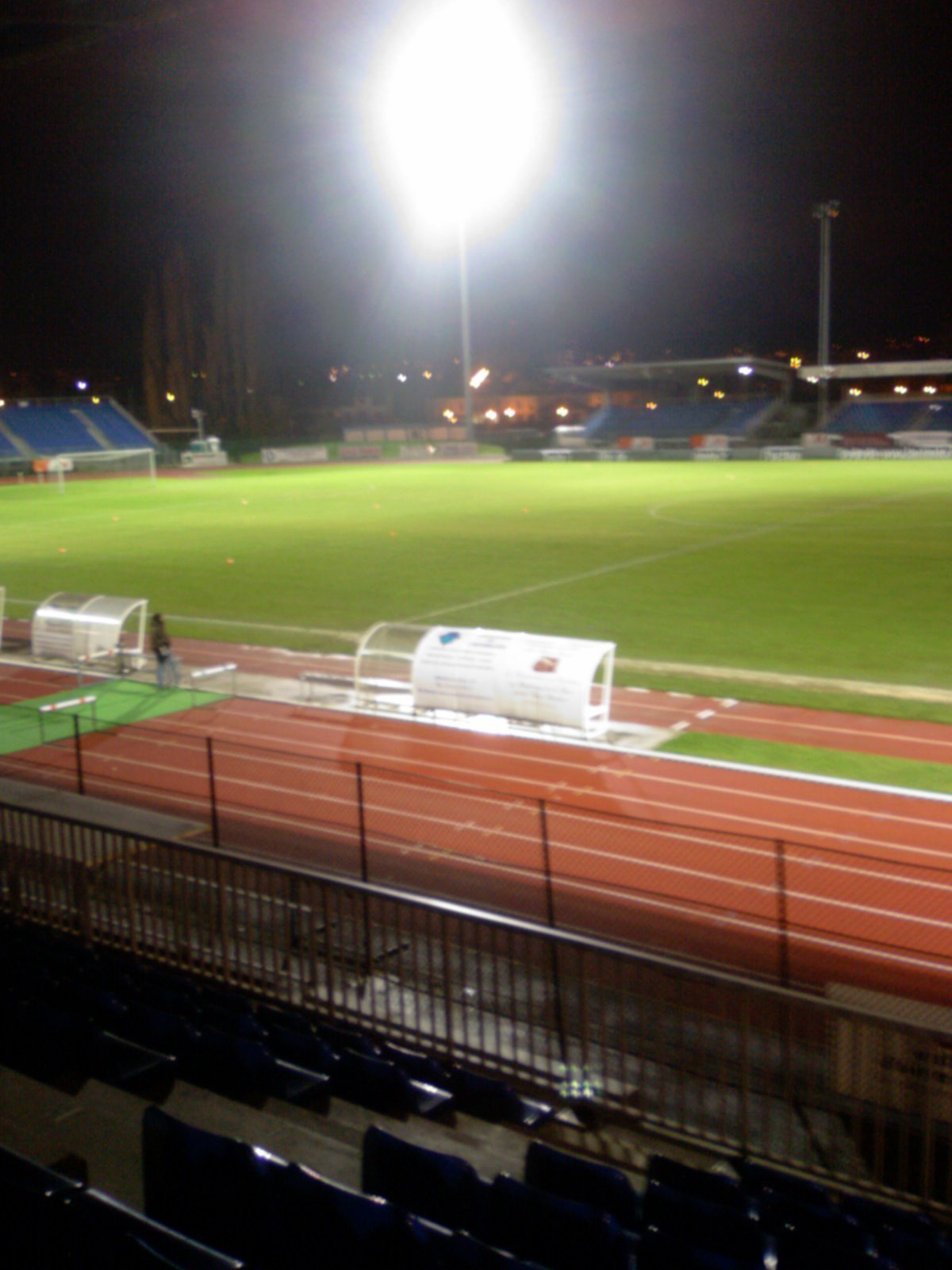
- Interactive map of Parc des Sports Michel Hidalgo
- Location: Sannois, France
- Capacity: 8,000
- Surface: grass

Tenant
- L'Entente SSG

Parc des Sports Michel Hidalgo is a multi-use stadium in Sannois, France. It is currently used mostly for football matches and is the home stadium of Entente SSG. The stadium is able to hold 8,000 people.
