= Thomas Guerbert =

French footballer (born 1989)

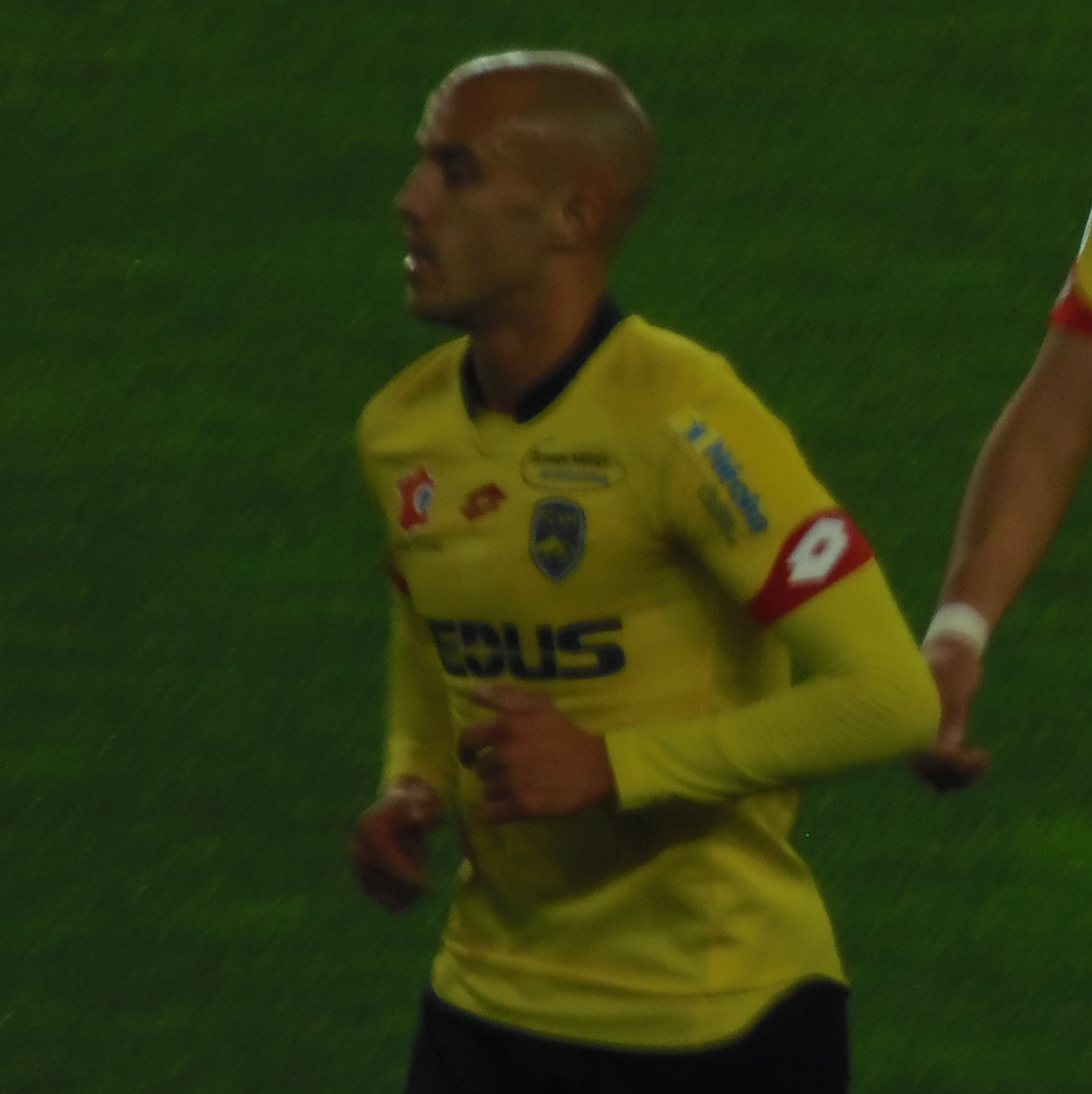

Personal information
- Full name: Thomas Guerbert
- Date of birth: 6 April 1989 (age 37)
- Place of birth: Meaux, France
- Height: 1.80 m (5 ft 11 in)
- Position: Midfielder

Youth career
- 2004–2009: Auch Football

Senior career*
Years	Team	Apps	(Gls)
2009–2011	Luzenac	62	(8)
2011–2013	Dijon	68	(9)
2013–2016	Sochaux	44	(1)
2016–2018	Clermont	10	(1)
Total		184	(19)
- * Club domestic league appearances and goals

Thomas Guerbert (born 6 April 1989) is a French former footballer who played as a midfielder.

== Club career ==
=== Luzenac ===
Guerbert played with US Luzenac for two years, in which he amassed over 60 appearances. In his final season with Luzenac in the Championnat National, the third level of French football, Guerbert was named the league's Player of the Year by news publication France Football.

=== Dijon ===
After signing with Dijon FCO, he made his professional debut on 31 August 2011 in a Coupe de la Ligue match against Valenciennes. In the contest, Guerbert scored the game-winning goal in a 3–2 win.

=== Sochaux ===
In September 2013, Guerbert joined FC Sochaux-Montbéliard from Dijon for an undisclosed fee.

On 2 November 2013, Guerbert suffered a double leg break and a dislocated ankle, as a result of a tackle from Saint-Étienne defender Kurt Zouma. which ruled him out for the rest of the season.

=== Clermont Foot ===
In late June 2016, Guerbert joined Clermont Foot.

== Personal life ==
Guerbert is the older brother of the footballer Matthieu Guerbert.
