= Franck Julienne =

French footballer (born 1991)

Personal information
- Date of birth: 7 March 1991 (age 35)
- Place of birth: Gonesse, France
- Height: 1.71 m (5 ft 7 in)
- Position: Forward

Youth career
- 1997–2004: FCM Garges-les-Gonesse
- 2004: AAS Sarcelles
- 2004–2007: Troyes
- 2007–2008: Rennes

Senior career*
Years	Team	Apps	(Gls)
2008–2011	Rennes II	59	(12)
2010–2013	Rennes	1	(0)
2011–2012	→ Le Havre (loan)	13	(0)
2011–2012	→ Le Havre II	13	(2)
2012–2013	→ Vannes (loan)	19	(1)
2013–2014	Lyon-Duchère	9	(1)
2017	Endoume	11	(6)
2017–2018	Martigues	7	(1)
2018–2019	Lyon-Duchère	28	(5)
2019–2020	Le Mans	10	(0)
2019–2020	Le Mans II	5	(4)
2020	Al-Ahli Manama		
2020–2021	Bourg-en-Bresse	15	(1)
2021–2022	Al-Kawkab		(2)

International career
2009	France U18	2	(0)
- * Club domestic league appearances and goals as of 30 June 2022

Franck Julienne (born 7 March 1991) is a French footballer who plays as a forward or winger.

Julienne made his professional debut for Rennes in Ligue 1 in 2011 and played in Ligue 2 for Le Havre before dropping into the amateur leagues and spending more than two years without a club. He returned to the professional ranks with the newly promoted Le Mans in 2019. He joined Bahraini club Al-Ahli Manama in 2020 before returning to French football with Bourg-en-Bresse, and spent the 2021–22 season with Al-Kawkab of the Saudi First Division League.

In international football, he played twice for the French under-18 team.

== Life and career ==
=== Early life and youth career ===
Julienne was born in 1991 in Gonesse, in the outer suburbs of Paris. He played for a local boys' team, FCM Garges-les-Gonesse, until mid-2004 when he joined AAS Sarcelles. He was not there for long. The French Football Federation amended their rules to restrict movements of children to clubs within a 50-kilometre (31-mile) radius of their current club, the change to come into force on 31 December 2004. A few days prior, Julienne and two other 13-year-olds left Sarcelles to join the centre de formation at ESTAC Troyes, some 180 kilometres (110 miles) distant. He moved on from Troyes to Rennes as a 16-year-old in April 2007.

He was top scorer for Rennes' under-16 team in 2007–08, and made a brief appearance for their under-19 Coupe Gambardella-winning squad. He received several call-ups for the French under-18 team in 2008–09, but did not make his debut until a mini-tournament in August 2009, in which he played twice, against Mexico and hosts Japan.

=== Professional football with Rennes ===
Julienne made a few appearances for Rennes' reserve team in the Championnat de France Amateur (CFA) in 2008–09 and was a regular in the following two seasons. Head coach Frédéric Antonetti included him among the substitutes for the first time in October 2010, for the Ligue 1 visit to Lens, and he signed his first professional contract, of two-and-a-half years, in December. On 15 January 2011, Julienne made his Ligue 1 debut, albeit for just a couple of minutes with his side 4–0 up against Arles-Avignon. He was the seventh product of Rennes' youth system to be given a debut that season. He trained regularly with the first team, and was an unused substitute eleven times.

==== Loan spells ====
In June 2011, he signed on loan for the coming season for Ligue 2 club Le Havre. He arrived with a positive attitude towards the loan, expecting an increase in playing time and with that increased maturity, having come to a club he believed to allow young players to progress. The spell proved dispiriting. Although frequently in the first-team squad in the first couple of months of the season, he started only once in the league. In the second half of the campaign, he made nine starts for the reserve team in the CFA, but had little involvement with the first team.

Advised by former team-mate Abdoul Camara that it was a good place to come, Julienne signed on loan to Rennes' new partner club, Vannes of the third-tier Championnat National, where he expected to bounce back. Coach Stéphane Le Mignan pointed out that the club had several similar players already, but was delighted at his arrival and saw no reason why he shouldn't play. Julienne made only nineteen league appearances, of which just seven were in the starting eleven; he said later that when he arrived, the team was already settled and he was competing for one position with the in-form Mohamed Youssouf. In March 2013, he made three consecutive starts for the first time in two years.

=== Lyon-Duchère: decline and rise ===
Julienne left Rennes at the end of his contract. In July 2013, he was selected by the UNFP, the French players' union, for their team in the annual FIFPro Tournament, which showcases out-of-contract players. He scored twice in the group matches to help his team reach the final, which they lost to the Spanish representatives. In August, he signed for Lyon-Duchère, on a one-year contract with provision for a second year if the club were promoted from the fourth-tier Championnat de France Amateur (CFA) to the Championnat National. Injuries became an issue, and his appearances were few and far between; the tenth and last was on 11 January 2014.

He remained outside football for approaching two-and-a-half years. After playing in Ligue 1 as a 19-year-old, he was disappointed with the lack of regular football in his first loan spell and with the low level of his next, where he had arrived after the start of the season with the team already settled. Finding it increasingly difficult to adjust to the decline in his prospects, he became disenchanted with the game. Interviewed in 2019, he said he had nevertheless kept fit and told himself that he would return to football, just "needing to find the right moment". Julienne was contacted in 2017 by Grégory Poirier, manager of Marseille-based fifth-tier club Endoume, who helped him accept what happened in his past career and start preparing both mentally and physically for a future in the game.

Julienne signed for Endoume, and scored six goals from eleven appearances in the 2017–18 National 3 season. In December 2017, he moved up a level to join Martigues, where seven appearances and a goal in National 2 were enough to earn him a contract for the 2018–19 season. They were also enough to earn him a further step back up the ladder with a return to Lyon-Duchère of the Championnat National.

He was a regular in the team that finished fifth in the division, and played in all seven of their matches in the 2018–19 Coupe de France. Entering the competition in the fifth round, Lyon-Duchère progressed to the ninth (round of 64), in which Julienne assisted the first goal and scored the second as they beat Ligue 1 club Nîmes 3–0, and from there to the last 16, in which they went 2–0 up against the fourth-tier Vitré but lost to a goal in stoppage time. After a season in which he scored ten goals and made eight assists in all competitions, Lyon-Duchère were keen to retain Julienne's services, but the lure of playing at a higher level was too strong.

=== Return to professional football with Le Mans ===
Having attracted interest from several Ligue 2 clubs, Julienne signed for newly promoted Le Mans. The contract length was reported as one year with the option of a second. He went straight into the starting eleven for Le Mans' opening fixture, a 2–1 defeat at home to Lens, but never established himself as a regular in the side: he played in ten league matches, mainly as a substitute and without scoring, and twice in the Coupe de France. At the turn of the year, the club's president made Julienne available for transfer, and said that any mutually satisfactory options would be considered. On 25 January 2020, Le Mans confirmed that his contract had been terminated by mutual consent; the club thanked him for his professionalism and wished him all the best for the future.

=== Later career ===
A few days later, Julienne signed for Bahraini Premier League club Al-Ahli Club. He soon returned to France when the tournament was halted because of the COVID-19 pandemic.

Having trained with the club since the summer of 2020, Julienne signed with Bourg-Péronnas in November. He made 15 Championnat National appearances in what remained of the season. His only goal completed a 2–0 win against his former club.

Julienne spent the 2021–22 season with Al-Kawkab of the Saudi First Division League. He scored twice, and the team were relegated.

== Career statistics ==
As of match played 15 May 2021

Appearances and goals by club, season and competition
Club	Season	League			Coupe de France		Coupe de la Ligue		Other		Total	
Club	Season	Division	Apps	Goals	Apps	Goals	Apps	Goals	Apps	Goals	Apps	Goals
Rennes B	2008–09	CFA	5	1	—		—		1 (Note: Appearance in playoffs)	0	6	1
Rennes B	2009–10	CFA	29	6	—		—		0	0	29	6
Rennes B	2010–11	CFA	25	5	—		—		0	0	25	5
Rennes B	Total		59	12	—		—		1	0	60	12
Rennes	2010–11	Ligue 1	1	0	0	0	0	0	0	0	1	0
Le Havre (loan)	2011–12	Ligue 2	13	0	1	0	2	1	0	0	16	1
Le Havre B (loan)	2011–12	CFA	13	3	—		—		—		13	3
Vannes (loan)	2012–13	National	19	1	2	1	0	0	0	0	21	2
Lyon-Duchère	2013–14	CFA	9	1	1	0	0	0	—		10	1
Endoume	2017–18	National 3	11	6	1	0	—		—		12	6
Martigues	2017–18	National 2	7	1	—		—		—		7	1
Lyon-Duchère	2018–19	National	28	5	7	5	0	0	—		35	10
Le Mans	2019–20	Ligue 2	10	0	2	1	0	0	—		12	1
Le Mans B	2019–20	National 3	5	4	0	0	0	0	—		5	4
Bourg-Péronnas	2020–21	National	15	1	0	0	0	0	—		15	1
Career total			190	34	14	7	2	1	1	0	207	42
