= Evan Chevalier =

French footballer (born 1992)

Personal information
- Full name: Evan Chevalier
- Date of birth: 13 May 1992 (age 34)
- Place of birth: Bruges, Gironde, France
- Height: 1.78 m (5 ft 10 in)
- Position: Midfielder

Team information
- Current team: Stade Bordelais

Youth career
- Bordeaux

Senior career*
Years	Team	Apps	(Gls)
2009–2013	Bordeaux B	32	(9)
2011–2013	Bordeaux	1	(0)
2012–2013	→ Gazélec Ajaccio (loan)	11	(0)
2013–2015	Vendée Poiré-sur-Vie	11	(0)
2013–2015	Vendée Poiré-sur-Vie B	23	(7)
2015–2019	Bergerac	86	(3)
2019–2020	Nunawading City	2	(0)
2020–	Stade Bordelais	3	(0)
- * Club domestic league appearances and goals as of 21:58, 18 November 2020 (UTC)

Evan Chevalier (born 13 May 1992) is a French footballer, who plays as a midfielder for Stade Bordelais.

== Career ==
Chevalier began his career on FC Girondins de Bordeaux. On 24 April 2011, he made his Ligue 1 debut, against AS Saint-Étienne. He then played for Bordeaux's B team, and on 2 July 2012, he was loaned to newly promoted Gazélec Ajaccio, in the second level. In January 2013, he returned to Bordeaux, and was named on the bench in the matches against Ajaccio and Sochaux.
