= Abdelkader Kraichi =

French footballer (born 1989)

Personal information
- Date of birth: 17 February 1989 (age 37)
- Place of birth: Nîmes, France
- Height: 1.78 m (5 ft 10 in)
- Position: Midfielder

Youth career
- Aubagne
- 2006–2007: Marseille Endoume
- 2007–2008: Nîmes

Senior career*
| Years | Team | Apps | (Gls) |
| 2008–2009 | Nîmes | 1 | (0) |
| 2009–2010 | SO Cassis Carnoux | 22 | (0) |
| 2010–2011 | Marignage | 0 | (0) |
| 2011 | Arles-Avignon B | | |
| 2011–2012 | Gap | 6 | (0) |
| 2012–2014 | Les Herbiers | 56 | (3) |
| 2014–2016 | Marseille B | 50 | (6) |
| 2016–2017 | Marseille Consolat | 2 | (0) |
| 2017–2018 | Pau | 44 | (7) |
| 2018 | Pau B | 1 | (0) |
| 2018–2019 | Boulogne | 32 | (3) |
| 2019–2021 | Bourg-en-Bresse | 36 | (4) |
| 2021–2022 | Hyères | 13 | (3) |
- * Club domestic league appearances and goals as of 20:11, 30 December 2022 (UTC)

Abdelkader Kraichi (born 17 February 1989) is a French professional footballer who most recently played as a midfielder for Hyères.

== Career ==
Born in Nîmes, and raised in Aix-en-Provence, Kraichi started playing football at the age of five. He went on to play at the National level of U16 football with Aubagne FC and the National level of U18 football with US Marseille Endoume, from where he joined the training centre at Nîmes.

Kraichi made his single appearance at professional level in Ligue 2 with Nîmes on 16 March 2009.

In the summer of 2009, Kraichi left Nîmes, signing for Championnat National side SO Cassis Carnoux. He made 22 appearances for the team during the season, but they were relegated on the pitch, and off-field bankruptcy forced them to reform in the regional amateur divisions, and Kraichi left. Without a club, and the victim of a fake transfer scam in Turkey, he was eventually announced by US Marignanaise in December 2010, but by the start of February 2011 he was playing with the reserve side of AC Arles-Avignon.

Kraichi joined Gap FC in the CFA in the summer of 2011, but at the end of the season the club was bankrupt and dissolved, leaving him unemployed and considering quitting the sport. Instead, he signed for Les Herbiers VF in the CFA in the summer of 2012, and enjoyed two seasons playing there. He signed for Olympique de Marseille in the summer of 2014, taking the role of executive player, supervising the younger players in the reserve team for two seasons.

Injured at the end of the 2015–16 season, Kraichi remained with Olympique de Marseille to recover, and signed for neighbours GS Consolat in September 2016. He made just a couple of league appearances for the club, and signed for Pau FC in January 2017.

After a successful season and a half with Pau, Kraichi was signed by US Boulogne in May 2018. He featured in 31 of the 34 league games in his first season, but after starting the first game of the 2019–20 season he was dropped by his manager and forced to train with the reserved. He was told he was free to leave in October 2019, and later that month he signed a professional contract with Bourg-Péronnas.
