= Thomas Renault =

French footballer (born 1984)

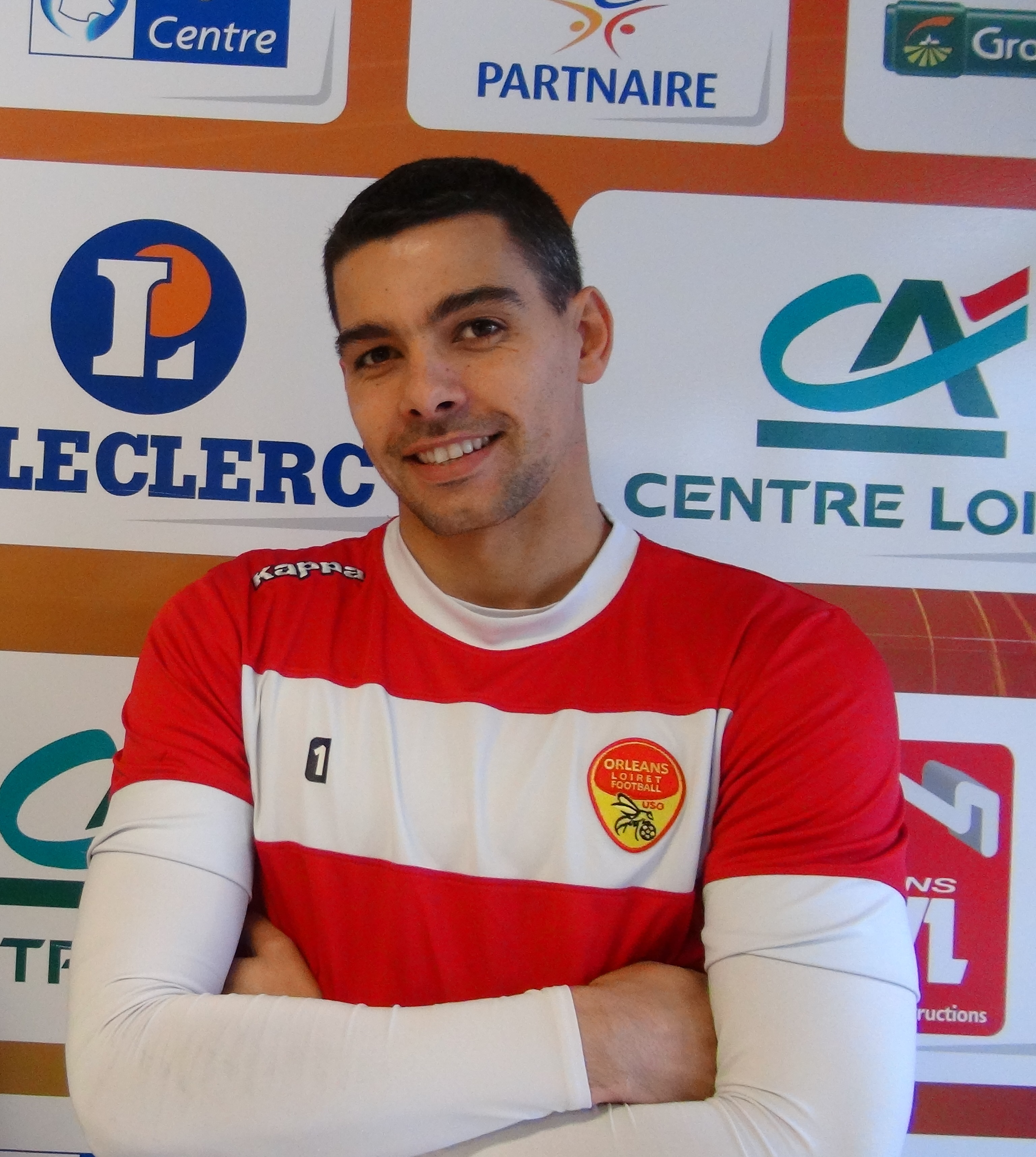

Personal information
- Date of birth: 5 March 1984 (age 42)
- Place of birth: Orléans, France
- Height: 1.84 m (6 ft 0 in)
- Position: Goalkeeper

Senior career*
Years	Team	Apps	(Gls)
2002–2020	Orléans	254	(0)
- * Club domestic league appearances and goals

Thomas Renault (born 5 March 1984) is a French former professional footballer who played as a goalkeeper. He spent all of his professional career with his hometown club Orléans.
