= Fabrice Seidou =

Ivorian footballer (born 1986)

Personal information
- Full name: Fabrice Seidou
- Date of birth: 19 December 1986 (age 39)
- Place of birth: Bondoukou, Ivory Coast
- Height: 1.85 m (6 ft 1 in)
- Position: Striker

Senior career*
Years	Team	Apps	(Gls)
2005–2007	Chamois Niortais	12	(1)
2007–2008	Orléans	29	(14)
2008–2009	Bayonne	26	(0)
2009–2010	Genêts Anglet	33	(4)
2010–2011	Carquefou	22	(6)
2011–2013	Saint-Pryvé Saint-Hilaire	25	(13)
2013–2015	Orléans	30	(1)
2015–2022	Saint-Pryvé Saint-Hilaire	159	(52)
Total		336	(91)
- * Club domestic league appearances and goals

Fabrice Seidou (born 19 December 1986) is an Ivorian former professional footballer who played as a striker.
