= Benjamin Gavanon =

French former professional footballer (born 1980)

Personal information
- Full name: Benjamin Gavanon
- Date of birth: 9 August 1980 (age 46)
- Place of birth: Marseille, France
- Height: 1.80 m (5 ft 11 in)
- Position: Central midfielder

Senior career*
Years	Team	Apps	(Gls)
1997–2003	Marseille	1	(0)
2000–2001	→ Aris Thessaloniki (loan)		
2003	→ Nottingham Forest (loan)	0	(0)
2003–2011	Nancy	215	(14)
2009–2010	→ Sochaux (loan)	27	(1)
2011–2012	Amiens	22	(4)
2012–2013	Shenzhen Ruby	56	(11)
2014	GS Consolat		
- * Club domestic league appearances and goals

Benjamin Gavanon (born 9 August 1980) is a French former professional footballer who played as a central midfielder.

== Career ==
Born in a suburb of Marseille, Gavanon started his career at his local club, Olympique de Marseille. However, Gavanon found it difficult to break into the Marseille first team, and played a total of seven minutes in six years as a professional at the club.

At the end of his time at Marseille, Gavanon spent a spell on loan at English club Nottingham Forest, then in the second tier of English football. However, Gavanon failed to break into the Forest first team and returned to France.

On his return, in the summer of 2003, Gavanon found himself unwanted, and his contract was terminated. He then signed a two-year contract with Ligue 2 club Nancy, and after impressing, earned himself a two-year extension, keeping him at the club until 2007.

After Nancy's promotion in 2005, Gavanon began to struggle with Ligue 1 football, but worked hard to regain his place towards the end of the season. He became a regular as Nancy continued in the top flight.

On 29 February 2012, China League One club Shenzhen Ruby announced that Gavanon had signed a two-year contract with the club.

== Honours ==
Nancy

- Coupe de la Ligue: 2005–06
