= Lamine Djaballah =

French-Algerian footballer (born 1982)

Personal information
- Full name: Mohamed Lamine Djaballah
- Date of birth: 4 July 1982 (age 44)
- Place of birth: Saint-Étienne, France
- Height: 1.70 m (5 ft 7 in)
- Position: Striker

Senior career*
Years	Team	Apps	(Gls)
2002–2004	Gazélec Ajaccio	44	(18)
2005	CR Belouizdad	4	(0)
2005–2008	Gap	85	(37)
2008–2009	Libourne	31	(4)
2009–2010	Gap	27	(18)
2010–2012	Amiens	60	(11)
2012–2013	Feurs	19	(9)
2013–2014	Andrézieux	21	(11)
2014–2018	Toulon	98	(25)
2018–2021	Côte Bleue	42	(15)
2021–2022	Marignane GCB	11	(3)
2022–2025	Aubagne Air Bel	48	(14)
- * Club domestic league appearances and goals as of 26 May 2025

Mohamed Lamine Djaballah (born 4 July 1982) is a French professional footballer who plays as a striker.
