= Charly Charrier =

French footballer (born 1986)

Personal information
- Date of birth: 27 May 1986 (age 40)
- Place of birth: La Roche sur Yon, France
- Height: 1.81 m (5 ft 11 in)
- Position: Midfielder

Team information
- Current team: La Roche

Senior career*
Years	Team	Apps	(Gls)
2006–2007	AS Cannes	5	(0)
2007–2008	SJA Le Poiré-sur-Vie		
2008–2010	Luçon	76	(19)
2011–2013	Guingamp	42	(4)
2013	Guingamp B	3	(1)
2013–2016	Luçon	72	(10)
2016–2018	Amiens SC	40	(3)
2018–2019	Les Herbiers	21	(3)
2019–	La Roche	4	(3)
- * Club domestic league appearances and goals as of 15:58, 18 November 2019 (UTC)

Charly Charrier (born 27 May 1986) is a French footballer who plays as a midfielder for La Roche VF.

== Career ==
On 27 April 2012, he scored his first goal in Ligue 2 with Guingamp in a 1–0 win over CS Sedan Ardennes. During the last 5 games of the 2011–2012 season, he scored 3 goals and added 2 assists, convincing his club to offer him a new two-year-contract.

On 25 September 2018, Charrier signed for Les Herbiers VF.
