= Benjamin Genghini =

French footballer (born 1985)

Personal information
- Date of birth: 16 December 1985 (age 40)
- Place of birth: Menton, France
- Height: 1.74 m (5 ft 9 in)
- Position: Attacking midfielder

Team information
- Current team: AS Mutzig

Youth career
- 2000–2003: Mulhouse
- 2003–2005: Sochaux

Senior career*
Years	Team	Apps	(Gls)
2005–2008	Sochaux	3	(1)
2006–2007	→ Raon-l'Étape (loan)	30	(8)
2008–2010	Gueugnon	49	(5)
2010–2014	Strasbourg	85	(12)
2014–2016	Mulhouse	54	(13)
2016–2020	SC Schiltigheim	92	(56)
2020–2022	Biesheim	23	(11)
2022–	AS Mutzig		

International career
2003–2004	France U-18	3	(1)
- * Club domestic league appearances and goals as of 07:29, 15 September 2022 (UTC)

Benjamin Genghini (born 16 December 1985) is a French professional footballer who plays as an attacking midfielder for Régional 3 – Grand Est club AS Mutzig.

== Career ==
Genghini was born in Menton, Alpes-Maritimes. He made his professional debut in Ligue 1 for FC Sochaux-Montbéliard on 26 November 2005. He came on as a substitute against Rennes in the 86th minute, and scored the only goal of the game. He made two further appearances that season, and was loaned to US Raon-l'Étape in Championnat National for the following season, where he featured in 30 of the 34 league games, scoring 8 times.

After leaving Sochaux at the end of his contract in the summer of 2008, Genghini was without a club until January 2009. After a trial with FC Mulhouse he signed an initial six month contract with Championnat National side FC Gueugnon. He remained at the club for an additional season, playing in most of the league games during his stay.

On 25 June 2010, Genghini signed a one-year contract, with the option of an additional year, for RC Strasbourg. He again featured in the majority (31 of 40) league games in the 2010–11 Championnat National season, helping the club finish just outside the promotion places. However, the club were administratively relegated to Championnat de France Amateur 2 due to financial difficulties. Genghini won back to back promotions with Strasbourg as they climbed back up the leagues, although he missed half of the 2012–13 season through a serious achilles tendon injury.

In August 2014 Genghini left Strasbourg and signed for FC Mulhouse in Championnat de France Amateur. He was a regular player for the club in both seasons, playing in 54 of a possible 60 games.

Genghini signed for SC Schiltigheim in the summer of 2016, to play in Championnat National 3.

He left ASC Biesheim in summer 2022 to play the sixth-tier Régional 1. Instead he joined Régional 3 – Grand Est club AS Mutzig.

== Personal life ==
Benjamin Genghini is of Italian descent and is the son of Bernard Genghini, who was also a professional footballer and 1984 European champion.
