= Oumar Pouye =

Senegalese footballer

Personal information
- Full name: Oumar Pouye
- Date of birth: June 19, 1988 (age 38)
- Place of birth: Niomre, Senegal
- Height: 1.80 m (5 ft 11 in)
- Position: Attacking midfielder

Youth career
- –2006: Génération foot
- 2006–2007: Metz

Senior career*
Years	Team	Apps	(Gls)
2007–2008	Metz	4	(0)
2008–2011	Évian	33	(6)
2011–2012	Metz	23	(1)
2011–2012	Metz B	3	(0)
2012–2015	Amiens	98	(25)
2015–2017	Strasbourg	13	(0)
2017	→ Quevilly-Rouen (loan)	15	(5)
2017–2018	US Créteil	27	(9)
2018–2020	Les Herbiers	39	(15)
2021–2022	Lusitanos Saint-Maur	6	(0)
- * Club domestic league appearances and goals as of 21:13, 16 January 2023 (UTC)

Oumar Pouye (born 19 June 1988 in Niomre, Senegal) is a Senegalese football midfielder.
