= Gaoussou Sackho =

French footballer (born 1995)

Personal information
- Date of birth: 8 February 1995 (age 31)
- Place of birth: Caen, France
- Height: 1.85 m (6 ft 1 in)
- Position: Forward

Team information
- Current team: JA Drancy

Senior career*
Years	Team	Apps	(Gls)
2014–2015	Caen B	9	(4)
2015–2016	Créteil	9	(1)
2016–2017	Créteil B	23	(14)
2017–2018	Montceau	28	(7)
2018–2019	Épinal	29	(3)
2019	Lusitanos Saint-Maur	0	(0)
2019–2020	Andrézieux	14	(4)
2020–2022	Fréjus Saint-Raphaël	14	(2)
2022–2023	Beauvais	5	(2)
2023	Épinal	8	(2)
2023–	JA Drancy	5	(1)
- * Club domestic league appearances and goals as of 25 November 2023

Gaoussou Sackho (born 8 February 1995) is a French professional footballer who plays as a forward for Championnat National 3 club JA Drancy.

== Personal life ==
Born in France, Sackho is of Malian descent. He holds both French and Malian nationalities.
