= Saint-Pryvé Saint-Hilaire FC =

French football club

- Full name: Saint-Pryvé Saint-Hilaire Football Club
- Founded: 2000
- Ground: Le Grand Clos
- Capacity: 1,800
- Chairman: Jean-Pierre Augis and Jean-Bernard Legroux
- Manager: Mathieu Pousse
- League: National 1 Group B
- 2024–25: National 2 Group B, 12th of 16
- Website: www.saintpryvefoot.fr
Home colours	Away colours

Saint-Pryvé Saint Hilaire FC is a French football club based in Saint-Pryvé-Saint-Mesmin that plays in Championnat National 1. It was created in 2000 by the merger of US Saint-Hilaire (created in 1966) and Saint-Pryvé CFC (1982).

== History ==
In the 2019–20 Coupe de France round of 64, the club defeated Ligue 1 side Toulouse 1–0 in one of biggest upsets in the competition's history.

Their forward, Carnejy Antoine, was joint top scorer of the tournament, alongside Pablo Sarabia.

== Current squad ==
As of 22 May 2025

Note: Flags indicate national team as defined under FIFA eligibility rules; some limited exceptions apply. Players may hold more than one non-FIFA nationality.

No.	Pos.	Nation	Player
1	GK	FRA	Allan Hunou
—	DF	FRA	Allan Nengoue
—	DF	FRA	Ryad Hrich
4	DF	FRA	Younesse Sabri
14	DF	GUF	Grégory Lescot
29	DF	FRA	Gabriel Osei Yaw
26	DF	FRA	Lorick Cots
—	DF	FRA	Alexis Martial
12	DF	GAB	Yoann Wachter
—	MF	FRA	Kenny Mavuba
13	MF	FRA	Joan Siber

No.	Pos.	Nation	Player
17	MF	FRA	Thibault Lemesle
—	MF	FRA	Antoine Bernasque
—	MF	FRA	Yanis Bousseaden
7	MF	GUF	Raphaël Galas
28	MF	FRA	Donovan Delgado
—	MF	FRA	Bryan Locko
24	MF	FRA	Wisâm Jedd
—	FW	FRA	Esteban Gonçalves
—	FW	FRA	Abou Thiam
—	FW	FRA	Jules Varvat
9	FW	FRA	Ikauar Mendes
