= 2016–17 Coupe de France =

Tournament details
- Country: France

Final positions
- Champions: Paris Saint-Germain (11th title)
- Runners-up: Angers

Tournament statistics
- Matches played: 194
- Goals scored: 601 (3.1 per match)
- Top goal scorer(s): El Hassane M'Barki (7 goals)

The 2016–17 Coupe de France was the 100th season of the most prestigious football cup competition of France. The competition was organised by the French Football Federation (FFF) and was opened to all clubs in French football, as well as clubs from the overseas departments and territories (Guadeloupe, French Guiana, Martinique, Mayotte, New Caledonia (winner of 2016 New Caledonia Cup), Tahiti (winner of 2015–16 Tahiti Cup), Réunion, and Saint Martin).

Paris Saint-Germain were the defending champions, and successfully defended their title following a 1–0 win over Angers in the final, a third consecutive win and eleventh overall, a record.

== Teams ==
=== Round 1 to 6 ===
The first six rounds, and any preliminaries, are organised by the Regional Leagues and the Overseas Territories, who allow teams from within their league structure to enter at any point up to the Third round. Teams from CFA 2 enter at the Third round, those from CFA enter at the Fourth round and those from Championnat National enter at the Fifth round.

=== Round 7 ===
The 145 qualifiers from the 6th Round of the Regional Leagues are joined by the 11 qualifiers from the Overseas Territories and the 20 teams from Ligue 2.

==== Ligue 2 ====
- Ajaccio
- Amiens
- Auxerre
- Bourg-en-Bresse
- Brest
- Clermont
- Gazélec Ajaccio
- Laval
- Le Havre
- Lens
- Nîmes
- Niort
- Orléans
- Red Star
- Reims
- Sochaux
- Strasbourg
- Tours
- Troyes
- Valenciennes

==== Regional Leagues ====
Figures in parentheses indicate the tier of the French football league system the team play at.

Alsace: 9 teams

- FC Mulhouse (4)
- FCSR Haguenau (5)
- US Sarre-Union (5)
- FC Soleil Bischheim (6)
- AS Erstein (6)
- US Oberlauterbach (6)
- FC Kronenbourg Strasbourg (6)
- SR Kaysersberg (9)
- FC Dahlenheim (10) (Note: One of the three lowest ranked teams to qualify from the Regional Leagues)

Aquitaine: 6 teams

- Pau FC (3)
- Stade Montois (4)
- Bergerac Périgord FC (4)
- Genêts Anglet (5)
- FC Bassin d'Arcachon (6)
- JA Biarritz (6)

Atlantique: 8 teams

- Les Herbiers VF (3)
- SO Cholet (4)
- USSA Vertou (5)
- FC Challans (6)
- Poiré-sur-Vie VF (6)
- TVEC Les Sables-d'Olonne (6)
- Olympique Saumur FC (6)
- AC Pouzauges-Réaumur (7)

Auvergne: 5 teams

- AS Yzeure (4)
- SA Thiers (6)
- CS Volvic (6)
- Ytrac Foot (6)
- FA Le Cendre (8)

Lower Normandy: 4 teams

- US Avranches (3)
- US Granville (4)
- SU Dives-Cabourg (5)
- US Alençon (6)

Burgundy: 4 teams

- CS Louhans-Cuiseaux (5)
- SC Selongey (5)
- UF Mâconnais (6)
- US St Sernin-du-Bois (6)

Centre-Val de Loire: 4 teams

- Châteauroux (3)
- SO Romorantin (4)
- Avoine OCC (5)
- Blois Foot 41 (5)

Centre-West: 6 teams

- Limoges FC (5)
- OL St Liguaire Niort (6)
- Poitiers FC (6)
- AS Aixoise (7)
- AS St Pantaleon (7)
- UA Niort St Florent (8)

Corsica: 2 teams

- CA Bastia (3)
- Borgo FC (5)

Franche-Comté: 3 teams

- ASM Belfort (3)
- Besançon FC (5)
- CA Pontarlier (5)

Languedoc-Roussillon: 5 teams

- AS Béziers (3)
- ES Paulhan-Pézenas (4)
- Olympique Alès (5)
- AS Frontignan AC (6)
- CE Palavas (6)

Lorraine: 8 teams

- SAS Épinal (3)
- FC Lunéville (5)
- Sarreguemines FC (5)
- Jarville JF (6)
- APM Metz (6)
- FC Sarrebourg (7)
- CS Homécourt (8)
- Entente Centre Ornain (9)

Maine: 3 teams

- Le Mans FC (5)
- ES Bonchamp (6)
- Ernéenne Foot (8)

Méditerranée: 5 teams

- GS Consolat (3)
- Étoile Fréjus Saint-Raphaël (4)
- Hyères FC (4)
- FC Istres (7)
- FC Rousset-Ste Victoire (7)

Midi-Pyrénées: 6 teams

- Rodez AF (4)
- Tarbes PF (4)
- Balma SC (5)
- Toulouse Rodéo FC (5)
- Blagnac FC (6)
- Luc Primaube FC (6)

(Nord-Pas-de-Calais) Nord-Pas de Calais: 13 teams

- US Boulogne (3)
- IC Croix (4)
- ES Wasquehal (4)
- Feignies Aulnoye FC (5)
- US Maubeuge (5)
- St Amand FC (6)
- US Saint-Omer (6)
- Stade Portelois (6)
- CS Avion (7)
- Olympique Marcquois (7)
- Villeneuve-d'Ascq Métropole (7)
- AS Étaples (8)
- AS Steenvoorde (10)

Champagne-Ardenne: 4 teams

- CS Sedan Ardennes (3)
- AS Prix-lès-Mézières (5)
- Chaumont FC (6)
- SA Sézanne (6)

(Upper Normandy) Normandy: 4 teams (Note: One of JS St Nicolas-d'Aliermont and RC Caudebec should have qualified, but the Disciplinary Commission of the Normandy League disqualified both after an incident in the 6th round match. The game was abandoned after 115 minutes with the scoreline 2–1. An appeal will follow from JS St Nicolas-d'Aliermont)

- US Quevilly-Rouen (3)
- Grand-Quevilly FC (6)
- Olympique Pavillais (7)

Brittany: 14 teams

- US Concarneau (3)
- AS Vitré (4)
- Stade Briochin (5)
- TA Rennes (5)
- Vannes OC (5)
- Saint-Colomban Sportive Locminé (6)
- US Montagnarde (6)
- Plouzané ACF (6)
- GSI Pontivy (6)
- Guipavas GdR (7)
- Ploufragan FC (7)
- Stade Pontivyen (7)
- RC Rannée-La Guerche-Drouges (7)
- ASPTT Brest (10)

Paris Île-de-France: 11 teams

- JA Drancy (4)
- FC Fleury 91 (4)
- ES Viry-Châtillon (4)
- Sainte-Geneviève Sports (5)
- US Sénart-Moissy (5)
- Blanc Mesnil SF (6)
- AF Bobigny (6)
- Le Mée Sports (6)
- Champigny FC 94 (7)
- Claye-Souilly SF (9)
- ES Parisienne (9)

Picardy: 7 teams

- FC Chambly (3)
- AS Beauvais Oise (5)
- US Roye-Noyon (5)
- AFC Compiègne (6)
- US Chauny (7)
- ESC Longueau (7)
- US St Maximin (7)

Rhône-Alpes: 14 teams

- AS Lyon-Duchère (3)
- ASF Andrézieux (4)
- Grenoble Foot 38 (4)
- AS Saint-Priest (5)
- Cluses-Scionzier FC (6)
- Côte Chaude Sportif (6)
- Hauts Lyonnais (6)
- FC Rhône Vallées (6)
- FC Vaulx-en-Velin (6)
- UF Belleville St Jean-d'Ardières (7)
- FC Bords-de-Saône (7)
- AS Misérieux-Trévoux (7)
- Olympique St Marcellin (7)
- AS Savigneux-Montbrison (8)

==== Overseas Territories teams ====
French Guiana: 2 teams

- US Matoury (DH)
- Le Geldar De Kourou (DH)

Martinique: 2 teams

- Club Franciscain (LR1)
- Golden Lion FC (LR1)

Guadeloupe: 2 teams

- CS Moulien (DH)
- Phare du Canal (DH)

Réunion: 2 teams

- AS Excelsior (D1R)
- JS Saint-Pierroise (D1R)

Mayotte: 1 team

- FC Mtsapéré (DH)

New Caledonia: 1 team

- AS Magenta (SL)

(French Polynesia) Tahiti: 1 team

- AS Dragon (L1)

== Seventh round ==
The draw for the seventh round is made in two parts. First the Overseas teams are drawn against opponents from the French League structure who have applied to potentially travel overseas. Those French teams not drawn in this part are re-entered into the main draw which takes place a day later.

The matches were played on 11, 12, and 13 November 2016.

=== Ties involving overseas teams ===
The draw took place on 26 October 2016.

12 November 2016	CS Moulien (DH) (Guadeloupe)	0–3	FC Fleury 91 (4)	Les Abymes, Guadeloupe
20:00 AST			Hébert 30' (pen.); Fofana 40'; Slijepcevic 65'	Stadium: Stade René Serge Nabajoth

12 November 2016	AS Magenta (SL) (New Caledonia)	1–7	Pau FC (3)	Nouméa, New Caledonia
15:00 NCT	Wajoka 89'	Report	Soni 11'; Sanchez 18'; Gbizié 44'; Rivas 46', 85'; Pereira Lage 87'; Guyon 91' (pen.)	Stadium: Stade Numa-Daly Magenta

13 November 2016	Club Franciscain (LR1) (Martinique)	0–0 (a.e.t.) (3–4 p)	FC Lunéville (5)	Le François, Martinique
14:00 AST				Stadium: Stade Municipal François

12 November 2016	ASC Le Geldar (DH) (French Guiana)	1–3	SC Selongey (5)	Cayenne, French Guiana
17:00 GFT	Charlot 78'		Hamroune 29', 54'; Tchounet 79'	Stadium: Stade Georges-Chaumet

13 November 2016	JS Saint-Pierroise (D1R) (Réunion)	0–0 (a.e.t.) (3–4 p)	Sainte-Geneviève Sports (5)	Saint-Denis, Réunion
16:00 RET				Stadium: Stade Jean-Ivoula

12 November 2016	Avoine OCC (5)	1–1 (a.e.t.) (2–4 p)	(Réunion) AS Excelsior (D1R)	Avoine
14:00 CET	Briaux 35'		Elcaman 45'	Stadium: Stade Marcel Vignaud

12 November 2016	Rodez AF (4)	3–2 (a.e.t.)	(Mayotte) FC Mtsapéré (DH)	Rodez
14:00 CET	Bonnet 1', 119'; Daillet 59'		Ali 45', 90'	Stadium: Stade Paul Lignon

12 November 2016	ASM Belfort (3)	4–0	(Guadeloupe) Phare du Canal (DH)	Belfort
14:00 CET	François 29', 78'; Mambu 42'; Arisi 83'			Stadium: Stade Serzian

12 November 2016	US Avranches (3)	9–0	(French Polynesia) AS Dragon (L1)	Avranches
14:00 CET	N'Kololo 17'; Le Joncour 22'; Mayulu 31', 65'; Bénet 37', 45+7'; Thiaré 71'; Schur 83', 90+2'			Stadium: Stade René Fenouillère

12 November 2016	FC Mulhouse (4)	3–0	(French Guiana) US Matoury (DH)	Mulhouse
14:00 CET	Camara 10', 74'; Mayer 45'			Stadium: Stade de l'Ill

12 November 2016	Tarbes PF (4)	1–0	(Martinique) Golden Lion FC (LR1)	Tarbes
14:00 CET	Pianelli-Balisoni 71'			Stadium: Stade Maurice Trélut

=== Main draw ===
The draw took place on 27 October 2016. It was split into 10 regional groups.

==== Group A ====
12 November 2016	JA Biarritz (6)	2–1 (a.e.t.)	FC Bassin d'Arcachon (6)	Biarritz
19:30 CET	Saint Ramon 37' (o.g.); Duventru 95'		Belbaz 7'	Stadium: Stade Saint Martin

12 November 2016	Poitiers FC (6)	1–4	Châteauroux (3)	Poitiers
18:00 CET	Tein-Padom 63'		Sawadogo 6'; Dépres 14', 90'; Tounkara 86' (pen.)	Stadium: Stade de la Pépinière

12 November 2016	Genêts Anglet (5)	2–0	OL St Liguaire Niort (6)	Anglet
18:00 CET	Dos Santos 16'; Claverie 57'			Stadium: Stade Saint-Jean

12 November 2016	AS Aixoise (7)	1–4	Ajaccio (2)	Limoges
20:00 CET	Verdavaine 70'		Maâzou 32', 45'; Vidémont 56', 81'	Stadium: Stade Saint-Lazare

13 November 2016	AS St Pantaleon (7)	0–1	Bergerac Périgord FC (4)	Brive-la-Gaillarde
15:00 CET			Bouscarrat 45+5'	Stadium: Stade André Pestourie

13 November 2016	UA Niort St Florent (8)	0–6	Limoges FC (5)	Niort
14:00 CET			Sanogo 20'; Pinson 57', 81'; Belfoul 59' (pen.); Arab 90'; Lahaye 90+2'	Stadium: Stade de Massujat

11 November 2016	Stade Montois (4)	1–2	Niort (2)	Mont-de-Marsan
15:30 CET	Abrassart 6'		Dabasse 4'; Djigla 84'	Stadium: Stade de l'Argenté

==== Group B ====
12 November 2016	CE Palavas (6)	0–0 (a.e.t.) (6–7 p)	Toulouse Rodéo FC (5)	Palavas-les-Flots
14:00 CET				Stadium: Stade Louis Baumes

12 November 2016	Ytrac Foot (6)	0–6	Clermont (2)	Aurillac
16:00 CET			Dugimont 38', 46'; Lopy 44', 54', 71'; Guilavogui 68'	Stadium: Stade Jean Alric

12 November 2016	Blagnac FC (6)	2–1	AS Béziers (3)	Blagnac
18:00 CET	Afkir 35'; Ettien 83'		Soukouna 84'	Stadium: Complexe Sportif Andromède

13 November 2016	AS Frontignan AC (6)	1–0	ES Paulhan-Pézenas (4)	Frontignan
15:00 CET	Delport 67'		Cissé (red card) 32'	Stadium: Complexe Sportif Lucien Jean

13 November 2016	FA Le Cendre (8)	0–0 (a.e.t.) (3–2 p)	SA Thiers (6)	Le Cendre
14:00 CET				Stadium: Stade Jean Jaurès

12 November 2016	FC Istres (7)	3–2 (a.e.t.)	Nîmes (2)	Fos-sur-Mer
17:00 CET	Hama 57'; Lharib 59'; Caldeirinha 110'		Sissoko 28', 62'	Stadium: Stade Parsemain

12 November 2016	Balma SC (5)	3–0	Luc Primaube FC (6)	Balma
18:30 CET	Texier 49'; Cissé 85'; Hatime 90'			Stadium: Stade Municipal de Balma

12 November 2016	CS Volvic (6)	1–1 (a.e.t.) (1–3 p)	Olympique Alès (5)	Volvic
18:30 CET	Brunel 110'		Amouzou 120+3'	Stadium: Stade Michel Champleboux
	Penalties
	Corbin (penalty scored); Bailly (penalty missed); Le Moigne (penalty missed); Magne (penalty missed)		(penalty scored) Coundouris; (penalty scored) Ferreira; (penalty scored) Chabassut (penalty missed)

==== Group C ====
12 November 2016	Étoile Fréjus Saint-Raphaël (4)	3–1	Bourg-en-Bresse (2)	Saint-Raphaël
18:00 CET	Tlili 55', 76'; Gbohou 69'		Digbeu (red card) 45'; Heinry 59'	Stadium: Stade Louis Hon

12 November 2016	AS Saint-Priest (5)	1–1 (a.e.t.) (4–5 p)	FC Rhône Vallées (6)	Saint-Priest
18:00 CET	Bendaoud 120'		Jarfaroui 117'	Stadium: Stade Jacques Joly

12 November 2016	FC Vaulx-en-Velin (6)	0–2	Hyères FC (4)	Vaulx-en-Velin
20:00 CET			Ressa 76'; Pin 90+1'	Stadium: Stade Francisque Jomard

12 November 2016	Côte Chaude Sportif (6)	0–2	GS Consolat (3)	Saint-Étienne
14:00 CET			Demel 81'; Diawara 87'	Stadium: Stade Auguste Dury

12 November 2016	FC Bords-de-Saône (7)	1–2	Gazélec Ajaccio (2)	Chasselay
18:00 CET	Gizzi 60'		Court 30'; Cissé 78'	Stadium: Stade Ludovic Giuly

13 November 2016	AS Misérieux-Trévoux (7)	0–0 (a.e.t.) (1–4 p)	Grenoble Foot 38 (4)	Trévoux
14:00 CET				Stadium: Complexe Sportif Fétan

12 November 2016	Cluses-Scionzier FC (6)	3–2 (a.e.t.)	Borgo FC (5)	Cluses
18:00 CET	Brison 90'; Yahiaoui 119'; Amri 120+2'		Saffour 59'; Sonnerat 103'	Stadium: Stade Intercommuncal

13 November 2016	Olympique St Marcellin (7)	2–0	FC Rousset-Ste Victoire (7)	Saint-Marcellin
14:00 CET	Mercier 20'; Merabeti 32'		(red card) 65'	Stadium: Stade de la Saulaie

==== Group D ====
13 November 2016	Chaumont FC (6)	1–4 (a.e.t.)	ASF Andrézieux (4)	Chaumont
14:00 CET	Mzouri 83'		Barge 85'; Valente 93'; Spano 108', 119'	Stadium: Stade Georges Dodin

13 November 2016	UF Mâconnais (6)	1–3	AS Lyon-Duchère (3)	Mâcon
15:00 CET	Rigaud 35' (pen.)		Brahmia 13', 67'; Moizini 58'	Stadium: Stade Pierre Guérin

13 November 2016	Hauts Lyonnais (6)	1–0	AS Yzeure (4)	Moulins
14:00 CET	Bennekrouf 34'			Stadium: Stade Hector Rolland

12 November 2016	CA Pontarlier (5)	2–0	Sochaux (2)	Pontarlier
16:30 CET	Miranda 26'; Coly 70'			Stadium: Stade Paul Robbe

12 November 2016	US St Sernin-du-Bois (6)	1–4	Auxerre (2)	Montceau-les-Mines
18:00 CET	Romagnon 26'		Courtet 43', 90'; Konaté 80'; Montiel 82'	Stadium: Stade des Alouettes

13 November 2016	SA Sézanne (6)	1–3	CS Louhans-Cuiseaux (5)	Sézanne
14:00 CET	73'		De Carvalho 21'; Nebot 59'; Matukondolo 87'	Stadium: Stade Saint Hubert

13 November 2016	Belleville St Jean-d'Ardières (7)	3–1	AS Savigneux-Montbrison (8)	Saint-Jean-d'Ardières
14:00 CET	Ben Tahar 16', 71'; Mauriaud 90+2'		Zerrari 76'; Totin (red card) 86'	Stadium: Stade Marcel Giroud

==== Group E ====
12 November 2016	AS Erstein (6)	0–1	SAS Épinal (3)	Erstein
17:00 CET			Marques 45'	Stadium: Stade Municipal

13 November 2016	SR Kaysersberg (9)	3–2	FC Dahlenheim (10)	Kaysersberg
15:00 CET	Graff 17' (pen.); Klément 29'; Zirari 51'		Schamber 59'; El Amrioui 84' (pen.)	Stadium: Stade Joseph Aiolfi

12 November 2016	US Oberlauterbach (6)	0–2	Strasbourg (2)	Oberlauterbach
14:00 CET			Blayac 15'; Guillaume 54'	Stadium: Stade Municipal

11 November 2016	FC Sarrebourg (7)	0–2	Troyes (2)	Sarrebourg
18:00 CET			Grandsir 51'; Niane 86' (pen.)	Stadium: Stade Jean Jacques Morin

13 November 2016	US Sarre-Union (5)	4–0 (a.e.t.)	FC Kronenbourg Strasbourg (6)	Sarre-Union
15:00 CET	Djé 94', 95'; Hassidou 104'; Riff 113'			Stadium: Stade Omnisports

12 November 2016	FC Soleil Bischheim (6)	2–3	Sarreguemines FC (5)	Bischheim
18:00 CET	Trimborn 44'; Redelsperger 61'; Lange (yellow card) 75' (red card)		M'Barki 42', 90+2', 90+4'	Stadium: Parc des Sports

13 November 2016	Besançon FC (5)	4–1	FCSR Haguenau (5)	Besançon
15:00 CET	Gegout 3', 73'; Pesenti 55'; Crolet 60'		Koch 62'	Stadium: Stade Léo-Lagrange

==== Group F ====
13 November 2016	CS Homécourt (8)	1–3	AS Prix-lès-Mézières (5)	Homécourt
14:00 CET	Mauger 55'		Mokaké 13', 62', 85'	Stadium: Stade Bois de la Sarre

12 November 2016	US Roye-Noyon (5)	2–1 (a.e.t.)	APM Metz (6)	Roye
18:00 CET	Bouvet 84', 117'		Charpentier 90'; Dengler (yellow card) 120' (red card); Nisi (red card) 12+1'	Stadium: Stade André Coël

13 November 2016	US Chauny (7)	0–4	JA Drancy (4)	Chauny
14:00 CET			Sanogo 65', 70'; Ghili 74'; Baka 81'	Stadium: Stade Joncourt

13 November 2016	Entente Centre Ornain (9)	0–2	Jarville JF (6)	Ligny-en-Barrois
14:00 CET			Rigole 33'; Zwiller 45'	Stadium: Stade André Lepage; Attendance: 717

12 November 2016	Amiens (2)	0–2	FC Chambly (3)	Amiens
17:00 CET			Miranda 12'; Padovani 59'	Stadium: Stade de la Licorne

13 November 2016	Claye-Souilly SF (9)	2–3 (a.e.t.)	ESC Longueau (7)	Claye-Souilly
14:00 CET	Ikoko 20'; Sinoussi 43'		Gomes Monteiro 13'; Tassart 26', 96'	Stadium: Stade Clément Petit

13 November 2016	US St Maximin (7)	0–3	Reims (2)	Chantilly
14:30 CET			Charbonnier 9'; Berthier 17'; Baldé 45+2'	Stadium: Stade des Bourgognes

11 November 2016	AFC Compiègne (6)	1–2 (a.e.t.)	CS Sedan Ardennes (3)	Compiègne
16:30 CET	Sall 74'		Rouane 20'; Simothé 116'	Stadium: Stade Paul Cosyns

==== Group G ====
12 November 2016	Poiré-sur-Vie VF (6)	4–2	Le Mée Sports (6)	Le Poiré-sur-Vie
17:00 CET	Le Tapissier 9'; Edouard 30'; Paris 79'		Gacem 43'	Stadium: Stade de l'Idonnière

13 November 2016	RC Rannée-La Guerche-Drouges (7)	1–0 (a.e.t.)	USSA Vertou (5)	La Guerche-de-Bretagne
15:00 CET	Charron 118'			Stadium: Stade Municipal

12 November 2016	TVEC Les Sables-d'Olonne (6)	4–1	US Sénart-Moissy (5)	Les Sables-d'Olonne
19:00 CET	Corbes 18'; Sall 45'; Billet 81'; Libaud 90'		Fumu Tamuso 15'	Stadium: Stade De La Rudelière

12 November 2016	AC Pouzauges-Réaumur (7)	4–1	Champigny FC 94 (7)	Pouzauges
19:30 CET	Picault 3'; Payot 44'; Garcia 64'; Gautronneau 75'		Dali 56'	Stadium: Stade Jacques Chartier

12 November 2016	FC Challans (6)	0–1	SO Cholet (4)	Challans
18:00 CET			Trabelsi 38'	Stadium: Stade Jean Léveillé

13 November 2016	Olympique Saumur FC (6)	3–2	Tours (2)	Saumur
15:00 CET	Miath 12'; Poingt 40'; Thonnel 83'		Miguel 4'; Bergougnoux 45+1'	Stadium: Stade des Rives du Thouet

11 November 2016	SO Romorantin (4)	2–3	Blois Foot 41 (5)	Romorantin-Lanthenay
18:00 CET	Adjet 13'; Kehound 73'		Pérou 25'; Popineau 40', 46'	Stadium: Stade Jules Ladoumègue

12 November 2016	Les Herbiers VF (3)	1–1 (a.e.t.) (3–2 p)	Orléans (2)	Les Herbiers
18:30 CET	Sarr 90'		Chemin 31'	Stadium: Stade Massabielle

==== Group H ====
13 November 2016	ES Parisienne (9)	0–1	CA Bastia (3)	Saint-Ouen
15:00 CET			Camara 74'	Stadium: Stade de Paris

13 November 2016	ES Bonchamp (6)	1–5	US Alençon (6)	Bonchamp-lès-Laval
14:30 CET	Prosarpio 45'		El Hamdaoui 23' (pen.), 25', 88'; Tessier 54'; Kaldrejnane 64'	Stadium: Stade Pierre Guégan

12 November 2016	Le Mans FC (5)	2–0	AS Beauvais Oise (5)	Le Mans
18:00 CET	Doumbia 16'; Kebe 20'			Stadium: MMArena

13 November 2016	AF Bobigny (6)	1–2 (a.e.t.)	US Quevilly-Rouen (3)	Bobigny
14:00 CET	Mendes 64'		Basque 54' (pen.); Achahbar 101'	Stadium: Stade Auguste Delaune

12 November 2016	Grand-Quevilly FC (6)	0–3	Le Havre (2)	Rouen
18:00 CET			Julan 48', 54'; Dembélé 90'	Stadium: Stade Robert Diochon

13 November 2016	Olympique Pavillais (7)	0–3	Red Star (2)	Le Petit-Quevilly
15:00 CET			Ngamukol 73'; Sané 78', 87'	Stadium: Amable-et-Micheline-Lozai Stadium

13 November 2016	Ernéenne Foot (8)	1–1 (a.e.t.) (5–3 p)	Blanc Mesnil SF (6)	Ernée
14:00 CET	Canniou 23'		Mendy 42'	Stadium: Stade Marcel Boulanger

12 November 2016	ES Viry-Châtillon (4)	1–0	SU Dives-Cabourg (5)	Viry-Châtillon
17:00 CET	Baldé 23'			Stadium: Stade Henri Longuet

==== Group I ====
11 November 2016	Plouzané ACF (6)	1–2	US Granville (4)	Plouzané
14:30 CET	Uguen 42' (pen.)		Peron 37'; Théault 63'	Stadium: Stade de Trémaïdic

12 November 2016	TA Rennes (5)	2–4	GSI Pontivy (6)	Rennes
17:00 CET	Gérard 27', 70'		Havart 6', 45'; Bray 15'; Le Ho 80'	Stadium: Stade Roger Salengro

12 November 2016	Saint-Colomban Sportive Locminé (6)	1–1 (a.e.t.) (5–4 p)	AS Vitré (4)	Locminé
18:00 CET	M'Baye 105'		Zouhir 99'	Stadium: Stade Municipal du Pigeon Blanc

13 November 2016	Guipavas GdR (7)	1–1 (a.e.t.) (7–8 p)	US Montagnarde (6)	Guipavas
14:30 CET	Calvez 88' (pen.)		Mroz 54'	Stadium: Stade Éric Lamour

12 November 2016	ASPTT Brest (10)	0–3	Brest (2)	Brest
19:00 CET			Maupay 16'; Labidi 45'; Henry 78'	Stadium: Stade Francis-Le Blé

13 November 2016	Stade Pontivyen (7)	1–3	Stade Briochin (5)	Pontivy
14:30 CET	Le Pavic 78'		Quemper 38'; Rouxel 80'; Boudin 83'	Stadium: Stade du Faubourg de Verdun

12 November 2016	Ploufragan FC (7)	0–1	Vannes OC (5)	Ploufragan
14:30 CET			N'Dépo 20'	Stadium: Complexe Sportif du Haut Champ

12 November 2016	Laval (2)	2–1	US Concarneau (3)	Laval
18:00 CET	Moyo 32'; Bayard 90+1'		Id Azza 56'	Stadium: Stade Francis Le Basser

==== Group J ====
11 November 2016	AS Steenvoorde (10)	2–2 (a.e.t.) (1–2 p)	US Maubeuge (5)	Hazebrouck
18:00 CET	Petyt 55' (pen.); Koucke 120'		Hedin 70'; Safi (red card) 88'; Detrait 103'	Stadium: Stade Damette

12 November 2016	US Saint-Omer (6)	2–3 (a.e.t.)	IC Croix (4)	Saint-Omer
18:00 CET	Delaby 52', 79'		Robail 35'; Derville 45'; Hassani 100'	Stadium: Stade Gaston Bonnet

13 November 2016	Stade Portelois (6)	3–0	CS Avion (7)	Le Portel
14:00 CET	Duflos 27'; Cazin 60'; Lemaire 64' (pen.)			Stadium: Stade Amour Sergent

12 November 2016	Olympique Marcquois (7)	0–3	Lens (2)	Villeneuve-d'Ascq
19:30 CET			Bourigeaud 66'; Zoubir 71', 90'	Stadium: Stade Pierre-Mauroy

13 November 2016	Villeneuve-d'Ascq Métropole (7)	2–0	US Boulogne (3)	Villeneuve-d'Ascq
14:00 CET	Thélot 61'; Sonko 80' (pen.)			Stadium: Stade Jean Jacques

11 November 2016	AS Étaples (8)	0–2	Valenciennes (2)	Le Touquet
18:00 CET			Ntim 6'; S. Diarra 69'	Stadium: Stade Ferdi Petit

13 November 2016	St Amand FC (6)	1–3	ES Wasquehal (4)	Saint-Amand-les-Eaux
14:00 CET	Carvalho 64'		Goret 17'; Camara 45+1', 63'	Stadium: Stade Municipal

Feignies Aulnoye FC (5)	bye
Note: Feignies Aulnoye FC (5) received a bye due to the decision of the Normandy League to suspend both JS St Nicolas-d'Aliermont (7) and RC Caudebec (6).

== Eighth round ==
The draw for the Eighth round took place on 15 November 2016. Of the 88 teams qualifying, the lowest ranked was SR Kaysersberg (level 9). The draw for the remaining overseas team took place ahead of the main draw. AS Excelsior (D1R) (Réunion) were guaranteed a home draw under the rules of the competition. The main draw was divided into 6 regional groups.

Matches took place on 2, 3, and 4 December 2016.

=== Overseas draw ===
4 December 2016	AS Excelsior (D1R) (Réunion)	1–1 (a.e.t.) (3–0 p)	FC Mulhouse (4)	Saint-Paul, Réunion
19:00 RET	Tidjani 6'		Baur 75'	Stadium: Stade Paul Julius Bénard

=== Group A ===
3 December 2016	GSI Pontivy (6)	0–3	Brest (2)	Pontivy
18:00 CET			Maupay 54'; Labidi 62'; Paillot 80'	Stadium: Stade Municipal du Faubourg de Verdun

4 December 2016	Saint-Colomban Sportive Locminé (6)	0–4	Le Havre (2)	Locminé
15:00 CET			Salles-Lamonge 33'; Dembélé 48'; Ayasse 62'; Guitain 89'	Stadium: Stade Municipal du Pigeon Blanc

4 December 2016	RC Rannée-La Guerche-Drouges (7)	0–3	Blois Foot 41 (5)	La Guerche-de-Bretagne
14:30 CET			Baana Jaba 4'; Pérou 80'; Mongomba 83'	Stadium: Stade Municipal

3 December 2016	SO Cholet (4)	0–1	Laval (2)	Cholet
14:30 CET			Zeoula 48'	Stadium: Stade Olympique Choletais

3 December 2016	Vannes OC (5)	1–2	US Avranches (3)	Vannes
18:30 CET	N'Dépo 26' (pen.)		Mayulu 60'; Béni Nkololo 77'	Stadium: Stade de la Rabine

3 December 2016	Stade Briochin (5)	0–0 (a.e.t.) (1–3 p)	Châteauroux (3)	Saint-Brieuc
15:30 CET				Stadium: Fred-Aubert Stadium
	Penalties
	Poussevin (penalty scored); De Cler (penalty missed); Simon (penalty missed); Aboubakari (penalty missed)		(penalty scored) Lebrun; (penalty scored) Khadda; (penalty scored) Héloïse

4 December 2016	Olympique Saumur FC (6)	0–2	Poiré-sur-Vie VF (6)	Saumur
14:30 CET			Koutob Naoto 60'; Paris 90'	Stadium: Stade des Rives du Thouet

3 December 2016	US Montagnarde (6)	0–3	US Granville (4)	Inzinzac-Lochrist
18:30 CET			Peron 13'; Dogo 43'; Untereiner 86'	Stadium: Stade Mané Braz

=== Group B ===
2 December 2016	Limoges FC (5)	0–1 (a.e.t.)	Les Herbiers VF (3)	Limoges
20:00 CET	Caloin (red card)		Ba (red card) 94'; Tigroudja 108' (pen.)	Stadium: Stade Saint-Lazare

3 December 2016	Genêts Anglet (5)	0–0 (a.e.t.) (4–5 p)	Niort (2)	Anglet
18:00 CET				Stadium: Stade Saint-Jean
	Penalties
	Chort (penalty scored); Claverie (penalty scored); Giron (penalty scored); Dallois (penalty scored); Gourgues (penalty missed); Insua (penalty missed)		(penalty scored) Choplin; (penalty scored) Grange; (penalty scored) Sambia; (penalty scored) Roye; (penalty missed) Lamkel Zé; (penalty scored) Grich

4 December 2016	JA Biarritz (6)	3–2	TVEC Les Sables-d'Olonne (6)	Biarritz
13:30 CET	Duventru 21', 43'; Cottebrune 59'		Sall 27', 72'	Stadium: Stade Saint Martin

4 December 2016	Blagnac FC (6)	1–0	Red Star (2)	Blagnac
14:30 CET	Santisteva 3'			Stadium: Complexe Sportif Andromède

4 December 2016	AC Pouzauges-Réaumur (7)	0–1	Toulouse Rodéo FC (5)	Pouzauges
14:30 CET			Medienne 28'	Stadium: Stade Jacques Chartier

4 December 2016	Pau FC (3)	1–0	Tarbes PF (4)	Pau
14:30 CET	Séguret 58'			Stadium: Stade du Hameau

3 December 2016	Balma SC (5)	0–3	Bergerac Périgord FC (4)	Balma
18:30 CET			Bouscarrat 34', 62'; Jamaï 51'	Stadium: Stade Municipal de Balma

=== Group C ===
3 December 2016	Olympique Alès (5)	0–1	Gazélec Ajaccio (2)	Alès
18:00 CET			Le Moigne 88'	Stadium: Stade Pierre Pibarot

3 December 2016	ASF Andrézieux (4)	1–1 (a.e.t.) (2–4 p)	CS Louhans-Cuiseaux (5)	Andrézieux-Bouthéon
17:00 CET	Spano 33'		Hamdache 86'; Bonin (red card) 96'	Stadium: L'Envol Stadium

3 December 2016	FC Rhône Vallées (6)	0–5	Clermont (2)	Le Pouzin
20:00 CET			Jobello 25'; Dugimont 40'; Caddy 43', 54'; Laporte 84'	Stadium: Stade Emile Dupau

4 December 2016	FA Le Cendre (8)	0–4	Étoile Fréjus Saint-Raphaël (4)	Cournon d'Auvergne
15:00 CET			Samuel 19' (o.g.); Tlili 36', 47'; Gbohou 73'	Stadium: Stade Joseph et Michel Gardet

3 December 2016	GS Consolat (3)	1–0 (a.e.t.)	Hyères FC (4)	Marseille
15:00 CET	Sergio 105'			Stadium: Stade La Martine

4 December 2016	AS Frontignan AC (6)	0–2	CA Bastia (3)	Frontignan
14:00 CET			Camara 30'; Mendes 71'	Stadium: Complexe Sportif Lucien Jean

3 December 2016	FC Istres (7)	1–0	Rodez AF (4)	Fos-sur-Mer
17:00 CET	Larhrib 54'			Stadium: Stade Parsemain

=== Group D ===
4 December 2016	Olympique St Marcellin (7)	0–2	Troyes (2)	Saint-Marcellin
13:30 CET			Thiago Xavier 27'; Grandsir 90'	Stadium: Stade de la Saulaie

3 December 2016	ES Viry-Châtillon (4)	1–0 (a.e.t.)	ASM Belfort (3)	Viry-Châtillon
16:00 CET	Ben Brahim 120'			Stadium: Stade Henri Longuet

3 December 2016	Belleville St Jean-d'Ardières (7)	0–1	Besançon FC (5)	Arnas
19:00 CET			Crolet (red card) 32'; Gégout 78'	Stadium: Stade Palais Omnisports Escale

4 December 2016	FC Fleury 91 (4)	3–0	AS Lyon-Duchère (3)	Fleury-Mérogis
13:30 CET	Laïfa 40'; Fofana 43', 57'			Stadium: Stade Auguste Gentelet

3 December 2016	Cluses-Scionzier FC (6)	1–4	Auxerre (2)	Cluses
18:00	Brison 28'		Courtet 15', 40'; Aguilar 20'; Montiel 89'	Stadium: Stade Intercommunal

3 December 2016	CA Pontarlier (5)	0–1	Grenoble Foot 38 (4)	Pontarlier
16:00 CET			David (red card) 62'; André 84' (o.g.)	Stadium: Stade Paul Robbe

3 December 2016	Hauts Lyonnais (6)	0–0 (a.e.t.) (4–3 p)	SC Selongey (5)	Feurs
18:00 CET				Stadium: Stade Maurice Rousson

=== Group E ===
3 December 2016	Sainte-Geneviève Sports (5)	1–0	US Roye-Noyon (5)	Sainte-Geneviève-des-Bois
18:00 CET	N'Sele 60' (pen.)			Stadium: Stade Léo Lagrange

3 December 2016	Stade Portelois (6)	0–1	Ajaccio (2)	Boulogne-sur-Mer
19:00 CET			Nouri 39'	Stadium: Stade de la Libération

3 December 2016	Ernéenne Foot (8)	0–3	US Quevilly-Rouen (3)	Changé
18:00 CET			Taufflieb 51'; Séry 76'; Mendy 90'	Stadium: Stade Auguste Dalibard

3 December 2016	Le Mans FC (5)	0–2	FC Chambly (3)	Le Mans
18:00 CET			Mara 35' (o.g.); Benmeziane 86'	Stadium: MMArena

4 December 2016	Lens (2)	2–0	ES Wasquehal (4)	Lens
13:45 CET	Klonaridis 30'; Banza 66'			Stadium: Stade Bollaert-Delelis (Note: Tie reversed by FFF due to ES Wasquehal not being able to find a regulation stadium)

4 December 2016	US Alençon (6)	1–1 (a.e.t.) (3–4 p)	JA Drancy (4)	Alençon
14:30 CET	Juin 77' (pen.)		Guyonnet 90'	Stadium: Stade Jacques Fould

3 December 2016	ESC Longueau (7)	0–7	IC Croix (4)	Amiens
18:00 CET			Obino 47', 64'; Zmijak 58'; Robail 63'; Lorthiois 73'; Betina 75'; Delacourt 79'	Stadium: Stade Moulonguet

=== Group F ===
3 December 2016	Villeneuve-d'Ascq Métropole (7)	0–7	Reims (2)	Villeneuve-d'Ascq
13:45 CET			Kyei 26', 67'; Siebatcheu 41', 43', 57'; Baldé 70', 91'	Stadium: Stade Jean Jacques

3 December 2016	SR Kaysersberg (9)	0–9	Feignies Aulnoye FC (5)	Colmar
16:00 CET			Leghait 7', 81', 88'; Hamidi 25', 48', 65'; Jacquin 34'; Touré 58'; Roget 80'	Stadium: Colmar Stadium

3 December 2016	AS Prix-lès-Mézières (5)	3–1	US Maubeuge (5)	Prix-lès-Mézières
13:30 CET	Sylla 8'; Merbah 34'; Houlot 55'		Lemoine 58'	Stadium: Stade de la Poterie

3 December 2016	Sarreguemines FC (5)	2–1	Valenciennes (2)	Sarreguemines
18:00 CET	M'Barki 1', 19'		Butin 75'	Stadium: Stade de la Blies

3 December 2016	FC Lunéville (5)	3–1	Jarville JF (6)	Lunéville
18:00 CET	André 28'; Duminy 77', 85'		Jospitre 84'	Stadium: Stade Edouard Fénal

3 December 2016	SAS Épinal (3)	1–0	CS Sedan Ardennes (3)	Épinal
14:00 CET	Gboho 88'			Stadium: Stade de la Colombière (Note: Tie switched by FFF due to weather conditions in Sedan. CS Sedan Ardennes appealed the decision.)

3 December 2016	US Sarre-Union (5)	0–1	Strasbourg (2)	Sarre-Union
14:30 CET			Boutaïb 77'	Stadium: Stade Omnisports

== Round of 64 ==
The draw for the round of 64 took place on 5 December 2016. The 44 winning teams from the eighth round are joined by the 20 teams from Ligue 1. Of the 64 teams qualifying, the lowest ranked was FC Istres (level 7). The draw was divided into 4 groups which were sorted to ensure primarily that each group had an even balance of teams from different levels, and secondarily to achieve optimum geographical proximity.

Ties took place between 6 and 18 January 2017.

=== Group A ===
6 January 2017	US Avranches (3)	3–1	Laval (2)	Avranches
21:00 CET	Bénet 48'; Afougou 59' (o.g.); Clauss 77'		Afougou 27'	Stadium: Stade René Fenouillère; Attendance: 3,500; Referee: Yohann Rouinsard

7 January 2017	Guingamp (1)	2–1	Le Havre (2)	Guingamp
18:00 CET	Diallo 42'; Briand 60'		Dembélé 90+1'	Stadium: Stade de Roudourou; Attendance: 10,599; Referee: Mikael Lesage

7 January 2017	US Quevilly-Rouen (3)	3–2	JA Drancy (4)	Rouen
18:00 CET	Guezoui 22', 58', 68'; Sanson (red card) 80'		Khous 44'; Dahchour 60' (pen.)	Stadium: Stade Robert Diochon; Attendance: 1,808; Referee: Mehdi Mokhtari

8 January 2017 (Note: Match originally scheduled for 7 January, but postponed due to a frozen pitch.)	Sainte-Geneviève Sports (5)	0–3	Caen (1)	Sainte-Geneviève-des-Bois
14:15 CET			Rodelin 25', 45'; Santini 58' (pen.)	Stadium: Stade Léo Lagrange; Attendance: 1,545; Referee: Clément Turpin

18 January 2017 (Note: Match originally scheduled for 8 January, but postponed due to a frozen pitch.)	FC Fleury 91 (4)	2–0	Brest (2)	Bondoufle
18:30 CET	Tertereau 2', 80'			Stadium: Stade Robert Bobin; Attendance: 500; Referee: Aurélien Petit

7 January 2017	Poiré-sur-Vie VF (6)	3–1	ES Viry-Châtillon (4)	Le Poiré-sur-Vie
15:00 CET	Le Tapissier 18'; Koutob 22'; Paris 75'		Diakhaté 59'	Stadium: Stade de l'Idonnière; Attendance: 1,574; Referee: Jeremy Stinat

8 January 2017	US Granville (4)	1–2	Angers (1)	Granville
17:00 CET	Jégu 9'		Bamba 24'; Nwakaeme 61'	Stadium: Stade Louis Dior; Attendance: 2,878; Referee: Benoît Millot

8 January 2017	Lorient (1)	2–1	Nice (1)	Lorient
14:15 CET	Aliadière 70'; Mesloub 75'		Pléa 43'	Stadium: Stade du Moustoir; Attendance: 9,424; Referee: Olivier Thual

=== Group B ===
6 January 2017	Les Herbiers VF (3)	4–3	Gazélec Ajaccio (2)	Les Herbiers
21:00 CET	Glombard 2'; Schuster 25' (pen.); Tigroudja 36'; Gbelle 46'		Ducourtioux 10'; Court 60'; Phojo 62' (o.g.)	Stadium: Stade Massabielle; Attendance: 3,013; Referee: Eric Wattellier

8 January 2017	Châteauroux (3)	4–1	Pau FC (3)	Châteauroux
17:00 CET	Tounkara 52'; Dépres 55', 68', 73'		Laplace-Palette 41'	Stadium: Stade Gaston Petit; Attendance: 1,466; Referee: Florent Batta

7 January 2017	Blagnac FC (6)	0–1	Niort (2)	Blagnac
15:00 CET			Djigla 69'	Stadium: Complexe Sportif Andromède; Attendance: 1,348; Referee: William Lavis

8 January 2017	JA Biarritz (6)	0–6	Rennes (1)	Biarritz
17:00 CET			Ugartemendia 29' (o.g.); Saïd 31'; Diakhaby 33'; Gnagnon 39'; Habibou 67'; Mexer 74'	Stadium: Parc des Sports Aguiléra; Attendance: 8,442; Referee: Johan Hamel

7 January 2017	Bergerac Périgord FC (4)	2–2 (a.e.t.) (3–2 p)	Toulouse Rodéo FC (5)	Bergerac
15:00 CET	Mayenga 33'; Duféal 95'		Kamissoko 2' (o.g.); Khazri (red card) 51'; Goncalves 120+1'	Stadium: Stade de Camp Real; Attendance: 1,100; Referee: Cédric Dos Santos

8 January 2017	Toulouse (1)	1–2 (a.e.t.)	Marseille (1)	Toulouse
14:15 CET	Durmaz 57'		Cabella 47', 107'	Stadium: Stadium Municipal; Attendance: 18,905; Referee: Amaury Delerue

7 January 2017	Blois Foot 41 (5)	1–2	Nantes (1)	Blois
18:00 CET	Cissé 45+1'		Stępiński 23', 66'	Stadium: Stade Municipal des Allées Jean Leroi; Attendance: 5,500; Referee: Jérôme Brisard

8 January 2017	Clermont (2)	0–1	Bordeaux (1)	Clermont-Ferrand
14:15 CET			Malcom 87'	Stadium: Stade Gabriel Montpied; Attendance: 5,804; Referee: Karim Abed

=== Group C ===
6 January 2017	Monaco (1)	2–1	Ajaccio (2)	Monaco
21:00 CET	Falcao 19'; Germain 67'		Cavalli 65' (pen.)	Stadium: Stade Louis II; Attendance: 2,000; Referee: Sébastien Desiage

8 January 2017	FC Istres (7)	1–3 (a.e.t.)	GS Consolat (3)	Fos-sur-Mer
17:00 CET	Sofikitis 108'		Sergio 94', 99'; Nagui 120+2'	Stadium: Stade Parsemain; Attendance: 1,047; Referee: Salem Zyed Ben El Hadj

7 January 2017	Grenoble Foot 38 (4)	1–2	Étoile Fréjus Saint-Raphaël (4)	Grenoble
18:00 CET	Spano 62'		Mendy 28'; Dumas (red card) 49'; Soly 83' (pen.)	Stadium: Stade des Alpes; Attendance: 2,869; Referee: Romain Delpech

7 January 2017	Besançon FC (5)	0–3	Nancy (1)	Besançon
18:00 CET			Hadji 33'; Robic 38'; Coulibaly 40'	Stadium: Stade Léo Lagrange; Attendance: 4,365; Referee: Frank Schneider

7 January 2017	CS Louhans-Cuiseaux (5)	0–2	Dijon (1)	Louhans
18:00 CET			Tavares 49'; Bela 70'	Stadium: Stade du Bram; Attendance: 4,299; Referee: Thomas Léonard

7 January 2017	Hauts Lyonnais (6)	0–0 (a.e.t.) (3–4 p)	CA Bastia (3)	Feurs
15:00 CET				Stadium: Stade Maurice Rousson; Attendance: 1,774; Referee: Alexandre Perreau Niel

8 January 2017	Auxerre (2)	4–2 (a.e.t.)	Troyes (2)	Auxerre
14:15 CET	Courtet 5', 120'; Ayé 87'; Montiel 112'		Nivet 9' (pen.), 51'	Stadium: Stade de l'Abbé-Deschamps; Attendance: 3,567; Referee: Benoît Bastien

8 January 2017	Lyon (1)	5–0	Montpellier (1)	Décines-Charpieu
21:00 CET	Lacazette 4'; Diakhaby 9'; Fekir 42'; Cornet 71', 74'			Stadium: Parc Olympique Lyonnais; Attendance: 12,096; Referee: François Letexier

=== Group D ===
7 January 2017	Lille (1)	4–1	(Réunion) AS Excelsior (D1R)	Villeneuve-d'Ascq
15:00 CET	Amadou 17'; Soumaoro 59'; Lopes 89'; Terrier 90'		Pythié 88'	Stadium: Stade Pierre-Mauroy; Attendance: 6,673; Referee: Ruddy Buquet

7 January 2017	Sarreguemines FC (5)	2–1	Reims (2)	Sarreguemines
15:00 CET	M'Barki 35' (pen.), 81' (pen.)		Charbonnier 40' (pen.)	Stadium: Stade de la Blies; Attendance: 2,167; Referee: Stéphane Jochem

14 January 2017 (Note: Match originally scheduled for 7 January, but was postponed due to a frozen pitch.)	AS Prix-lès-Mézières (5)	2–1	Feignies Aulnoye FC (5)	Charleville-Mézières
15:00 CET	Bila 60'; Aktas 89'		Leghait 56'	Stadium: Stade du Petit-Bois; Attendance: 2,079; Referee: Cedric Dos Santos

8 January 2017	IC Croix (4)	1–4	Saint-Étienne (1)	Villeneuve-d'Ascq
17:00 CET	Dia 43'		Hamouma 24'; Veretout 55'; Søderlund 79'; Keyta 90+3'	Stadium: Stade Pierre-Mauroy; Attendance: 3,538; Referee: Bartolomeu Varela

7 January 2017	Paris Saint-Germain (1)	7–0	SC Bastia (1)	Paris
21:00 CET	Thiago Silva 31'; Rabiot 42'; Nkunku 49'; Motta 57'; Lucas 64' (pen.); Di María 77'; Draxler 89'			Stadium: Parc des Princes; Attendance: 46,744; Referee: Jérôme Miguelgorry

8 January 2017	Lens (2)	2–0	Metz (1)	Lens
14:15 CET	Bourigeaud 63'; Koukou (red card) 83'; López 90'			Stadium: Stade Bollaert-Delelis; Attendance: 15,964; Referee: Sylvain Palhies

14 January 2017 (Note: Match originally scheduled for 7 January, but was postponed due to a frozen pitch.)	FC Lunéville (5)	0–2	FC Chambly (3)	Lunéville
15:00 CET			Gendrey 56'; Poirot 87' (o.g.)	Stadium: Stade Edouard Fénal; Attendance: 1,800; Referee: Benjamin Lepaysant

7 January 2017	Strasbourg (2)	4–2 (a.e.t.)	SAS Épinal (3)	Strasbourg
15:00 CET	Seka 55'; Liénard 62'; Blayac 108' (pen.); Benkaid 113'		Cestor 20'; Lemb 50'	Stadium: Stade de la Meinau; Attendance: 6,082; Referee: Stéphanie Frappart

== Round of 32 ==
The draw for the Round of 32 was made on 8 January 2017. The lowest ranked club remaining was Poiré-sur-Vie VF (level 6). Matches took place on 31 January and 1 February 2017.

31 January 2017	US Quevilly-Rouen (3)	3–0	GS Consolat (3)	Le Petit-Quevilly
18:00 CET	Oliveira 66'; Guezoui 68'; Achahbar 90+3'		Wilwert (red card) 6'	Stadium: Stade Robert-Diochon; Attendance: 3,362; Referee: Thomas Léonard

1 February 2017	Étoile Fréjus Saint-Raphaël (4)	1–0	AS Prix-lès-Mézières (5)	Saint-Raphaël
18:00 CET	Gbohou 90'			Stadium: Stade Louis-Hon; Attendance: 1,200; Referee: Romain Delpech

31 January 2017	Poiré-sur-Vie VF (6)	0–1	Strasbourg (2)	Le Poiré-sur-Vie
18:00 CET			Gragnic 10'	Stadium: Stade de l'Idonnière; Attendance: 3,574; Referee: Stéphane Jochem

31 January 2017	Marseille (1)	2–1 (a.e.t.)	Lyon (1)	Marseille
21:05 CET	Fanni 24'; Dória 109'		Tolisso 64'	Stadium: Stade Vélodrome; Attendance: 53,502; Referee: Amaury Delerue

1 February 2017	Rennes (1)	0–4	Paris Saint-Germain (1)	Rennes
21:00 CET			Draxler 27', 68'; Lucas 38'; Ben Arfa 90'	Stadium: Roazhon Park; Attendance: 21,524; Referee: Jérôme Miguelgorry

31 January 2017	Sarreguemines FC (5)	0–3	Niort (2)	Sarreguemines
18:00 CET			Grange 6'; Dabasse 45'; Ndoh 88'	Stadium: Stade de la Blies; Attendance: 2,500; Referee: Aurélien Petit

1 February 2017	CA Bastia (3)	2–0	Nancy (1)	Ajaccio
18:00 CET	Camara 11'; Hérelle 89'			Stadium: Stade Ange Casanova; Attendance: 1,231; Referee: Bartolomeu Varela

1 February 2017	Les Herbiers VF (3)	1–2 (a.e.t.)	Guingamp (1)	Les Herbiers
18:00 CET	Glombard 90+1'		Mendy 72'; Bodmer 114'	Stadium: Stade Massabielle; Attendance: 4,600; Referee: Olivier Thual

31 January 2017	Lille (1)	1–0	Nantes (1)	Lille
18:00 CET	Corchia 80' (pen.)			Stadium: Stade Pierre-Mauroy; Attendance: 7,571; Referee: Sébastien Desiage

31 January 2017	Châteauroux (3)	2–3 (a.e.t.)	Lorient (1)	Châteauroux
18:00 CET	Tounkara 5'; Siebatcheu 62'; Angoula (red card) 109'		Cabot 49'; Cafú 77', 111' (pen.)	Stadium: Stade Gaston Petit; Attendance: 2,957; Referee: Hakim Ben El Hadj

1 February 2017	US Avranches (3)	1–0	FC Fleury 91 (4)	Avranches
18:00 CET	Louiserre 59'			Stadium: Stade René Fenouillère; Attendance: 3,200; Referee: William Lavis

31 January 2017	Bordeaux (1)	2–1	Dijon (1)	Bordeaux
18:00 CET	Malcom 53'; Laborde 90+2'		Diony 83'	Stadium: Matmut Atlantique; Attendance: 5,738; Referee: Mikael Lesange

31 January 2017	Bergerac Périgord FC (4)	2–0	Lens (2)	Bergerac
18:00 CET	Bouscarrat 38'; Covin 48'			Stadium: Stade Gaston Simounet; Attendance: 4,500; Referee: Florent Batta

1 February 2017	Auxerre (2)	3–0 (a.e.t.)	Saint-Étienne (1)	Auxerre
18:00 CET	Yattara 97'; Touré 105'; Boto 119'			Stadium: Stade de l'Abbé-Deschamps; Attendance: 7,508; Referee: Karim Abed

1 February 2017	FC Chambly (3)	4–5 (a.e.t.)	Monaco (1)	Beauvais
18:00 CET	Soubervie 57', 90+3'; Gendrey 81'; Padovani 111'		Carrillo 17'; Lemar 34'; Mbappé 48'; N'Doram 96'; Glik 103'	Stadium: Stade Pierre Brisson; Attendance: 7,555; Referee: Johan Hamel

1 February 2017	Angers (1)	3–1	Caen (1)	Angers
18:00 CET	Mangani 14' (pen.), 82'; Capelle 89'		Thomas 36' (o.g.)	Stadium: Stade Jean-Bouin; Attendance: 4,059; Referee: Tony Chapron

== Round of 16 ==
The draw for the Round of 16 was made on 2 February 2017. The lowest ranked clubs remaining were Étoile Fréjus Saint-Raphaël and Bergerac Périgord FC (level 4). Matches took place between 28 February and 2 March 2017.

28 February 2017	Étoile Fréjus Saint-Raphaël (4)	2–0	Auxerre (2)	Saint-Raphaël
18:00 CET	Mendy 5'; Tlili 37'	Report		Stadium: Stade Louis-Hon; Attendance: 1,142; Referee: Hakim Ben El Hadj

2 March 2017	Bergerac Périgord FC (4)	1–2	Lille (1)	Libourne
21:00 CET	Kamissoko 90+2'; Pinto (red card) 90+5'	Report	Lopes 70'; Éder 90+4'	Stadium: Stade Jean-Antoine Moueix; Attendance: 4,223; Referee: Olivier Thual

1 March 2017	US Quevilly-Rouen (3)	1–2	Guingamp (1)	Le Petit-Quevilly
18:30 CET	Vignaud 90+2'	Report	Mendy 59'; De Pauw 61'	Stadium: Stade Robert-Diochon; Attendance: 7,536; Referee: Nicolas Rainville

1 March 2017	Marseille (1)	3–4 (a.e.t.)	Monaco (1)	Marseille
21:05 CET	Payet 43'; Cabella 84', 111'	Report	Pelé 19' (o.g.); Mbappé 66'; Mendy 104'; Lemar 113'	Stadium: Stade Vélodrome; Attendance: 35,513; Referee: Benoît Millot

28 February 2017	Bordeaux (1)	2–1	Lorient (1)	Bordeaux
21:00 CET	Laborde 61', 72'	Report	Jeannot 48'	Stadium: Matmut Atlantique; Attendance: 7,151; Referee: Mikael Lesange

28 February 2017	CA Bastia (3)	0–1	Angers (1)	Ajaccio
18:00 CET		Report	Diedhiou 40'	Stadium: Stade Ange Casanova; Attendance: 1,167; Referee: Amaury Delerue

1 March 2017	Niort (2)	0–2	Paris Saint-Germain (1)	Niort
18:30 CET		Report	Pastore 78'; Cavani 90+4'	Stadium: Stade René Gaillard; Attendance: 9,333; Referee: Bartolomeu Varela

1 March 2017	US Avranches (3)	1–1 (a.e.t.) (6–5 p)	Strasbourg (2)	Avranches
18:30 CET	Mayulu 48'	Report	Gragnic 90+2'	Stadium: Stade René Fenouillère; Attendance: 2,890; Referee: Lionel Jaffredo
	Penalties
	Michel (penalty scored); Le Joncour (penalty scored); Derrien (penalty scored); Louiserre (penalty scored); Lavenant (penalty missed); Abdallah (penalty scored); Guyonnet (penalty scored)		(penalty missed) Liénard; (penalty scored) Blayac; (penalty scored) Saad; (penalty scored) Sacko; (penalty scored) Gragnic; (penalty scored) Guillaume; (penalty missed) Grimm

== Quarter-finals ==
The draw for the quarter-finals was made on 1 March 2017. The lowest ranked club remaining was Étoile Fréjus Saint-Raphaël (level 4). Matches took place on 4 and 5 April 2017.

5 April 2017	Angers (1)	2–1	Bordeaux (1)	Angers
18:30 CEST	Bérigaud 8'; N'Doye 67'	Report	Sankharé 18'	Stadium: Stade Raymond Kopa; Attendance: 12,507; Referee: Antony Gautier

5 April 2017	US Avranches (3)	0–4	Paris Saint-Germain (1)	Caen
21:05 CEST		Report	Ben Arfa 35', 53'; Lucas 56'; Pastore 82'	Stadium: Stade Michel d'Ornano; Attendance: 19,052; Referee: Jérôme Miguelgorry

4 April 2017	Monaco (1)	2–1	Lille (1)	Monaco
21:00 CEST	Germain 35', 45'	Report	Arcus (red card) 40'; El Ghazi 90+3'	Stadium: Stade Louis II; Attendance: 5,709; Referee: Tony Chapron

4 April 2017	Étoile Fréjus Saint-Raphaël (4)	0–1	Guingamp (1)	Cannes
18:00 CEST		Report	Mendy 50'	Stadium: Stade Pierre de Coubertin; Attendance: 4,871; Referee: Benoît Millot

== Semi-finals ==
The draw for the semi-finals was made on 5 April 2017. Matches took place on 25 and 26 April 2017.

25 April 2017	Angers (1)	2–0	Guingamp (1)	Angers
21:00 CEST	Mangani 38'; Toko Ekambi 90+2'	Report		Stadium: Stade Raymond Kopa; Attendance: 15,540; Referee: Benoît Millot

26 April 2017	Paris Saint-Germain (1)	5–0	Monaco (1)	Paris
21:05 CEST	Draxler 26'; Cavani 31'; Mbaé 50' (o.g.); Matuidi 52'; Marquinhos 90'	Report		Stadium: Parc des Princes; Attendance: 47,298; Referee: Clément Turpin

== Final ==
The final took place on 27 May 2017 at the Stade de France in Saint-Denis.

27 May 2017
21:00 CEST

Angers	0–1	Paris Saint-Germain
	Report	Cissokho 90+1' (o.g.)

Stade de France, Saint-Denis
Attendance: 78,000
Referee: Benoît Bastien
