= 2016–17 in French football =

Football in France
- Season: 2016–17

Men's football
- Ligue 1: Monaco
- Ligue 2: Strasbourg
- Championnat National: Châteauroux
- Coupe de France: Paris Saint-Germain
- Coupe de la Ligue: Paris Saint-Germain
- Trophée des Champions: Paris Saint-Germain

Women's football
- Division 1: Lyon
- Coupe de France: Lyon

The following article is a summary of the 2016–17 football season in France, which was the 83rd season of competitive football in the country and ran from July 2016 to June 2017.

== League tables ==
=== Ligue 1 ===
Pos	Team	Pld	W	D	L	GF	GA	GD	Pts	Qualification or relegation
1	Monaco (C)	38	30	5	3	107	31	+76	95	Qualification for the Champions League group stage
2	Paris Saint-Germain	38	27	6	5	83	27	+56	87	Qualification for the Champions League group stage
3	Nice	38	22	12	4	63	36	+27	78	Qualification for the Champions League third qualifying round
4	Lyon	38	21	4	13	77	48	+29	67	Qualification for the Europa League group stage (Note: Since the winners of the 2016–17 Coupe de France and the 2016–17 Coupe de la Ligue, Paris Saint-Germain, qualified for European competition based on league position, the spot awarded to the Coupe de France winners (Europa League group stage) was passed to the fourth-placed team and the spot awarded to the Coupe de la Ligue winners (Europa League third qualifying round) was passed to the sixth-placed team. The fifth-placed team received the spot in Europa League third qualifying round originally designated to the fourth-placed team.)
5	Marseille	38	17	11	10	57	41	+16	62	Qualification for the Europa League third qualifying round
6	Bordeaux	38	15	14	9	53	43	+10	59	Qualification for the Europa League third qualifying round
7	Nantes	38	14	9	15	40	54	−14	51	
8	Saint-Étienne	38	12	14	12	41	42	−1	50	
9	Rennes	38	12	14	12	36	42	−6	50	
10	Guingamp	38	14	8	16	46	53	−7	50	
11	Lille	38	13	7	18	40	47	−7	46	
12	Angers	38	13	7	18	40	49	−9	46	
13	Toulouse	38	10	14	14	37	41	−4	44	
14	Metz	38	11	10	17	39	72	−33	43	
15	Montpellier	38	10	9	19	48	66	−18	39	
16	Dijon	38	8	13	17	46	58	−12	37	
17	Caen	38	10	7	21	36	65	−29	37	
18	Lorient (R)	38	10	6	22	44	70	−26	36	Qualification for the relegation play-offs
19	Nancy (R)	38	9	8	21	29	52	−23	35	Relegation to Ligue 2
20	Bastia (D, R)	38	8	10	20	29	54	−25	34	Relegation to National 3 (Note: After being relegated to Ligue 2, Bastia was initially further relegated to National due to financial difficulties. On 10 August 2017, the FFF announced that Bastia was denied entry to National. The club therefore took the place of its reserve team in Championnat National 3.)

Source: Ligue 1, Soccerway
Rules for classification: 1) Points; 2) Goal difference; 3) Goals scored; 4) Head-to-head goal difference; 5) Fairplay ranking.
(C) Champions; (D) Disqualified; (R) Relegated

=== Ligue 2 ===
Pos	Team	Pld	W	D	L	GF	GA	GD	Pts	Promotion or Relegation
1	Strasbourg (C, P)	38	19	10	9	63	47	+16	67	Promotion to Ligue 1
2	Amiens (P)	38	19	9	10	56	38	+18	66	Promotion to Ligue 1
3	Troyes (O, P)	38	19	9	10	59	43	+16	66	Qualification to promotion play-offs
4	Lens	38	18	11	9	59	40	+19	65	
5	Brest	38	19	8	11	58	44	+14	65	
6	Nîmes	38	17	13	8	58	40	+18	64	
7	Reims	38	14	13	11	42	39	+3	55	
8	Le Havre	38	14	12	12	39	31	+8	54	
9	Gazélec Ajaccio	38	13	12	13	47	51	−4	51	
10	Niort	38	12	13	13	45	57	−12	49	
11	Ajaccio	38	13	9	16	47	58	−11	48	
12	Clermont Foot	38	11	13	14	46	48	−2	46	
13	Sochaux	38	11	13	14	38	43	−5	46	
14	Valenciennes	38	10	15	13	44	44	0	45	
15	Bourg-Péronnas	38	11	11	16	49	58	−9	44	
16	Tours	38	10	13	15	55	60	−5	43	
17	Auxerre	38	11	10	17	28	40	−12	43	
18	Orléans (Note: On 1 March 2017, the Commission de Contrôle des Clubs Professionnels de la DNCG confirmed a deduction of 4 points from Orléans for failing to adhere with financial reporting obligations.) (O)	38	11	9	18	41	54	−13	38	Qualification to relegation play-offs
19	Red Star (R)	38	8	12	18	36	56	−20	36	Relegation to Championnat National
20	Laval (R)	38	5	15	18	33	52	−19	30	Relegation to Championnat National

Source: Ligue 2
Rules for classification: 1) Points; 2) Goal difference; 3) Number of goals scored; 4) Head-to-head goal difference; 5) Fair play points
(C) Champions; (O) Play-off winners; (P) Promoted; (R) Relegated

=== Championnat National ===
Pos	Team	Pld	W	D	L	GF	GA	GD	Pts	Promotion or Relegation
1	Châteauroux (C, P)	34	16	11	7	43	35	+8	59	Promotion to Ligue 2
2	Quevilly-Rouen (P)	34	15	13	6	50	37	+13	58	Promotion to Ligue 2
3	Paris FC (Note: Paris FC lost the relegation play-off, but were promoted to fill the vacant spot created by the administrative relegation of SC Bastia from Ligue 1 to Championnat National.) (P)	34	15	9	10	30	18	+12	54	Qualification to promotion play-offs
4	Marseille Consolat	34	16	6	12	52	44	+8	54	
5	Chambly	34	14	12	8	42	34	+8	54	
6	Dunkerque	34	15	8	11	51	37	+14	53	
7	Lyon-Duchère	34	14	8	12	40	37	+3	50	
8	Béziers	34	14	8	12	44	41	+3	50	
9	Boulogne	34	13	10	11	47	38	+9	49	
10	Avranches	34	12	10	12	47	46	+1	46	
11	Concarneau	34	13	7	14	38	43	−5	46	
12	Créteil	34	12	6	16	40	49	−9	42	
13	Les Herbiers	34	8	15	11	38	42	−4	39	
14	Pau	34	8	14	12	28	37	−9	38	
15	Épinal (R)	34	8	13	13	33	39	−6	37	Relegation to National 2
16	CA Bastia (D, R)	34	9	9	16	34	53	−19	36	Merged after the season
17	Sedan (R)	34	9	8	17	39	52	−13	35	Relegation to National 2
18	Belfort (R)	34	8	7	19	32	46	−14	31	Relegation to National 2

Source: FFF.fr
Rules for classification: 1) points; 2) goal difference; 3) number of goals scored; 4) head-to-head goal difference; 5) fair play points
(C) Champions; (D) Disqualified; (P) Promoted; (R) Relegated

=== Championnat de France Amateur ===
Group A
Pos	Team	Pld	Pts
1	Rennes (res) (C)	30	56
2	Cholet (P)	30	51
3	Bergerac	30	48
4	Granville	30	47
5	Trélissac	30	46
6	Vitré	30	45
7	Romorantin	30	44
8	Fontenay	30	42
9	Saint-Malo	30	42
10	Paris Saint-Germain (res)	30	42
11	Lorient (res)	30	39
12	Chartres	30	33
13	Mantes	30	29
14	Plabennec (R)	30	29
15	Nantes (res) (R)	30	28
16	Châteaubriant (R)	30	26

Source: FFF.fr
(C) Champions;
(P) Promoted;
(R) Relegated

Group B
Pos	Team	Pld	Pts
1	Entente SSG (C, P)	30	58
2	Fleury	30	57
3	Saint-Maur	30	54
4	Boulogne-Billancourt	30	49
5	Arras FA	30	46
6	Lens (res)	30	44
7	Drancy	30	39
8	Lille (res)	30	38
9	Croix	30	37
10	Le Havre (res)	30	36
11	Viry-Châtillon	30	34
12	AC Amiens	30	33
13	Poissy	30	32
14	Wasquehal (R)	30	29
15	Dieppe (R)	30	28
16	Calais RUFC (R)	30	26

Source: FFF.fr
(C) Champions;
(P) Promoted;
(R) Relegated

Group C
Pos	Team	Pld	Pts
1	Grenoble (C, P)	28	66
2	Le Puy	28	57
3	Annecy	28	50
4	Lyon (res)	28	46
5	Jura Sud	28	44
6	Villefranche	28	40
7	Reims (res)	28	36
8	Andrézieux	28	33
9	Raon-l'Étape	28	32
10	Chasselay MDA	28	31
11	Yzeure	28	29
12	St-Louis Neuweg	28	28
13	Montceau	28	28
14	Auxerre (res) (R)	28	25
15	Mulhouse (R)	28	22
16	Evian Thonon Gaillard	0	0

Source: FFF.fr
(C) Champions;
(P) Promoted;
(R) Relegated

Group D
Pos	Team	Pld	Pts
1	Rodez (C, P)	30	61
2	Mont de Marsan	30	51
3	Fréjus Saint-Raphaël	30	51
4	Toulon	30	44
5	Colomiers	30	43
6	Hyères	30	43
7	Monaco (res)	30	42
8	Marignane-Gignac	30	40
9	Tarbes	30	39
10	Marseille (res)	30	38
11	Martigues	30	38
12	Nice (res)	30	35
13	Sète	30	35
14	Paulhan-Pézenas	30	33
15	Montpellier (res) (R)	30	31
16	Le Pontet (R)	30	24

Source: FFF.fr
(C) Champions;
(P) Promoted;
(R) Relegated
