= Baldé =

Baldé is a surname of West African origin. Some notable people with the surname include:

- Abdoulaye Baldé (footballer) (born 1986), French football (soccer) striker
- Abdoulaye Baldé (politician) (born 1964), Senegalese politician
- Adul Baldé (born 1989), Bissau-Guinean footballer
- Aldair Adulai Djaló Baldé (born 1992), Bissau-Guinean footballer
- Alejandro Baldé (born 2003), Bissau-Guinean and Dominican Spanish born footballer
- Algassimou Baldé (born 1984), Guinean footballer with AS Cannes in France
- Amido Baldé (born 1991), Portuguese professional footballer
- Bacar Baldé (born 1992), Bissau-Guinean footballer
- Bobo Baldé (born 1975), French-born Guinean professional footballer
- Cheick Sidia Baldé (born 1983), Guinean footballer
- Dai Baldé (born 2006), Bissau-Guinea footballer
- Elladj Baldé (born 1990), Canadian figure skater
- Elves Baldé (born 1999), Bissau-Guinean born Portuguese footballer
- Fatoumata Baldé (born 1993), Senegalese footballer
- Fatumata Djau Baldé, Bissau-Guinean politician and former Minister of Foreign Affairs
- Gerson Baldé (born 2000), Portuguese athlete
- Habib Baldé (born 1985), French-born Guinean footballer
- Hélder Baldé (born 1998), Portuguese footballer
- Ibrahima Baldé (born 1989), Senegalese footballer
- Ibraima Baldé (born 1986), Bissau-Guinean footballer
- Jean-François Baldé (born 1950), former Grand Prix motorcycle road racer from France
- Keita Baldé (born 1995), Senegalese footballer
- Mama Samba Baldé (born 1995), Bissau-Guinean footballer
- Mamadi Baldé (born 1978), Bissau-Guinean footballer
- Mamadou Baldé (born 1985), Senegalese football central midfielder
- Ousmane Baldé (died 1971), Guinean economist and politician
- Ousmane Baldé (footballer) (born 1980), Guinean footballer
- Romário Baldé (born 1996) Bissau-Guinean born Portuguese footballer
- Seydina Baldé (born 1976), French martial artist, actor, and stunt choreographer
- Sirah Baldé, Guinean writer and teacher
- William Baldé, singer-songwriter and composer born in Guinea

== See also ==
- Jakob Balde, German scholar
- Balde, San Luis
