= 2013–14 Championnat de France Amateur =

Championnat de France amateur
- Season: 2013–14
- Promoted: FC Chambly-Thelle; SAS Épinal; Marseille Consolat; US Avranches

The 2013–14 Championnat de France amateur was the 16th season since its establishment. FC Chambly-Thelle, SAS Épinal, Marseille Consolat and US Avranches were promoted.

== Teams ==
There were eight teams promoted from Championnat de France amateur 2, while eighteen teams were relegated from the 2012–13 Championnat de France amateur. These teams were also joined by SAS Épinal, AS Cherbourg and US Quevilly from the 2012–13 Championnat National. The original plan was to have FC Bourg-Péronnas, ES Uzès Pont du Gard and Paris FC also relegated from the Championnat National, but due DNCG rulings, FC Rouen, Le Mans FC and CS Sedan-Ardennes were relegated to lower divisions, and Bourg-Péronnas, Uzès Pont du Gard and Paris FC stayed on Championnat National.

On August 6, 2013, FCA Calvi, which ended on 7th on Group A, announced that they would renounce to participate the CFA because their stadium couldn't be homologated, which would force them to play in another stadium and that would be dangerous to their finances.

Because of the four spots open, FC Montceau Bourgogne, ES Viry-Châtillon, Stade Montois and Monts d'Or Azergues Foot remained on the CFA.

== League tables ==
=== Group A ===
Pos	Team	Pld	W	D	L	GF	GA	GD	Pts	Promotion or relegation
1	Chambly-Thelle (C, P)	28	13	12	3	38	19	+19	79	Promotion to 2013–14 Championnat National
2	Lille Reserves	28	15	5	8	46	26	+20	78	
3	Aubervilliers	28	12	9	7	35	35	0	73	
4	Roye	28	12	7	9	31	24	+7	71	
5	Beauvais	28	13	6	9	33	27	+6	70 (Note: 3 points deducted?)	
6	L'Entente SSG	28	11	8	9	34	28	+6	69	
7	Ivry	28	11	8	9	37	37	0	69	
8	AC Amiens	28	11	5	12	29	38	−9	66	
9	Paris Saint-Germain Reserves	28	10	8	10	34	35	−1	66	
10	Quevilly	28	11	5	12	32	28	+4	66	
11	Lens Reserves	28	10	7	11	33	33	0	65	
12	Dieppe	28	10	6	12	30	32	−2	64	
13	Mantes	28	9	9	10	24	30	−6	64	
14	Drancy	28	4	10	14	20	39	−19	50	Saved from relegation
15	Villemomble Sports (R)	28	3	5	20	16	51	−35	42	Relegation to 2013–14 Championnat de France amateur 2

Source: French Football Federation
Rules for classification: 1) points; 2) goal difference; 3) number of goals scored.
(C) Champions; (P) Promoted; (R) Relegated

=== Group B ===
Pos	Team	Pld	W	D	L	GF	GA	GD	Pts	Promotion or relegation
1	Épinal (C, P)	30	16	7	7	56	37	+19	85	Promotion to 2013–14 Championnat National
2	Moulins	30	15	7	8	51	35	+16	82	
3	Yzeure	30	12	12	6	42	31	+11	78	
4	Lyon Reserves	30	14	5	11	53	45	+8	77	
5	Mulhouse	30	13	6	11	36	38	−2	75	
6	Lyon-Duchère	30	12	7	11	40	37	+3	73	
7	Raon	30	11	9	10	45	49	−4	72	
8	Belfort	30	12	6	12	32	32	0	72	
9	Sarre-Union	30	11	7	12	48	47	+1	70	
10	Sochaux Reserves	30	11	7	12	37	40	−3	70	
11	Villefranche	30	10	8	12	34	32	+2	68	
12	Chasselay	30	10	8	12	33	39	−6	68	
13	Saint-Priest	30	11	5	14	28	45	−17	68	
14	Montceau	30	10	6	14	37	48	−11	66	Saved from relegation
15	Jura Sud	30	10	5	15	45	44	+1	65	Saved from relegation
16	Vesoul (D, R)	30	6	7	17	26	44	−18	55	Demotion to 7th division

Source: French Football Federation
Rules for classification: 1) points; 2) goal difference; 3) number of goals scored.
(C) Champions; (D) Disqualified; (P) Promoted; (R) Relegated

=== Group C ===
Pos	Team	Pld	W	D	L	GF	GA	GD	Pts	Promotion or relegation
1	Marseille Consolat (C, P)	28	14	8	6	48	25	+23	78	Promotion to 2013–14 Championnat National
2	Rodez	28	14	8	6	38	27	+11	77 (Note: 1 point deducted?)	
3	Grenoble	28	12	10	6	41	26	+15	74	
4	Hyères	28	12	9	7	31	32	−1	72 (Note: 1 point deducted?)	
5	Pau	28	11	8	9	32	27	+5	69	
6	Cannes (D, R)	28	9	10	9	31	30	+1	65	Demotion to 6th division
7	Martigues	28	10	7	11	30	29	+1	65	
8	Monaco Reserves	28	9	9	10	43	42	+1	64	
9	Béziers	28	7	14	7	35	32	+3	63	
10	Marignane	28	10	5	13	29	35	−6	63	
11	Nice Reserves	28	8	10	10	34	38	−4	62	
12	Le Pontet	28	9	6	13	23	36	−13	60 (Note: 1 point deducted?)	
13	Tarbes	28	7	10	11	24	35	−11	59	Saved from relegation
14	AS Valence (R, D)	28	6	12	10	26	34	−8	58	Club folded; refounded as Olympique de Valence
15	Stade Montois	28	6	6	16	29	46	−17	52	Saved from relegation

Source: French Football Federation
Rules for classification: 1) points; 2) goal difference; 3) number of goals scored.
(C) Champions; (D) Disqualified; (P) Promoted; (R) Relegated

=== Group D ===
Pos	Team	Pld	W	D	L	GF	GA	GD	Pts	Promotion or relegation
1	Avranches (C, P)	30	19	6	5	56	22	+34	93	Promotion to 2013–14 Championnat National
2	Saint-Malo	30	17	5	8	45	29	+16	86	
3	Les Herbiers	30	13	11	6	46	26	+20	80	
4	Nantes Reserves	30	13	8	9	31	23	+8	77	
5	Trélissac	30	12	8	10	29	26	+3	74	
6	Vitré	30	11	9	10	36	39	−3	72	
7	Concarneau	30	10	11	9	33	34	−1	71	
8	Stade Bordelais	30	11	7	12	29	36	−7	70	
9	Bordeaux Reserves	30	9	12	9	33	25	+8	69	
10	Pontivy	30	9	9	12	36	39	−3	66	
11	Viry	30	7	14	9	27	34	−7	65	
12	Romorantin	30	8	10	12	33	36	−3	64	
13	Vendée Fontenay	30	8	9	13	36	48	−12	63	
14	Cherbourg (D, R)	30	8	9	13	27	43	−16	63	Demotion to 6th division
15	Stade Plabennecois	30	6	10	14	28	42	−14	58	Saved from relegation
16	Jeunesse Villenavaise (R)	30	6	8	16	28	51	−23	54 (Note: 2 points deducted?)	Relegation to 2013–14 Championnat de France amateur 2

Source: French Football Federation
Rules for classification: 1) points; 2) goal difference; 3) number of goals scored.
(C) Champions; (D) Disqualified; (P) Promoted; (R) Relegated
