= Digbeu =

Digbeu is a surname. Notable people with the surname include:

- Alain Digbeu (born 1975), French basketball player
- Ange Digbeu (born 1992), French footballer
- Jennifer Digbeu (born 1987), French basketball player
- Leoh Digbeu (born 1990), Ivorian footballer
