= 2017–18 Championnat National 2 =

Championnat National 2
- Season: 2017–18
- Champions: Drancy
- Promoted: Drancy; Le Mans; Villefranche; Marignane-Gignac
- Relegated: 11 teams (see outcomes section)
- Top goalscorer: 20 goals Alexandre Ramalingom, Marignane-Gignac
- Biggest home win: Le Mans 10–0 Trélissac; Group D, Round 18, 3 February 2018
- Biggest away win: Raon-l'Étape 0–6 Schiltigheim; Group B, Round 28, 28 April 2018
- Highest scoring: 10 goals Le Mans 10–0 Trélissac; Group D, Round 18, 3 February 2018
- All statistics correct as of 09:35, 21 May 2018 (UTC).

The 2017–18 Championnat National 2 was the 20th season of the fourth tier in the French football league system. The competition was contested by 64 clubs split geographically across 4 groups of 16 teams each. The teams included amateur clubs (although a few were semi-professional) and the reserve teams of professional clubs.

== Teams ==
On July 13, the FFF ratified the constitution of the competition, and published the groups as follows:

- 48 clubs who were neither relegated or promoted from the 2016–17 Championnat de France Amateur groups.
- 4 teams relegated from 2016–17 Championnat National (Épinal, Belfort, Sedan and CA Bastia (Note: note that CA Bastia merged with Borgo FC to form FC Bastia-Borgo during the close season.)).
- 11 teams promoted from 2016–17 Championnat de France Amateur 2. (Saint-Brieuc, Saint-Pryvé, Beauvais, Ste-Geneviève, Saint-Priest, Grasse, Stade Bordelais, Schiltigheim, Le Mans, Furiani-Agliani and Limoges).
- 1 team reprieved from relegation from 2016–17 Championnat de France Amateur (Paulhan-Pézenas).

== League tables ==
Group A
Pos	Team	Pld	W	D	L	GF	GA	GD	Pts	Promotion or relegation
1	Marignane-Gignac (P)	30	17	6	7	39	25	+14	57 (Note: Marignane-Gignac is ahead of Toulon on head-to-head points: Marignane-Gignac 1–1 Toulon, Toulon 0–1 Marignane-Gignac)	Promotion to National
2	Toulon	30	17	6	7	41	25	+16	57	
3	Colomiers	30	14	9	7	43	27	+16	51	
4	Bergerac	30	13	10	7	43	28	+15	49 (Note: Bergerac is ahead of Fréjus Saint-Raphaël on head-to-head points: Bergerac 1–1 Fréjus Saint-Raphaël, Fréjus Saint-Raphaël 0–1 Bergerac)	
5	Fréjus Saint-Raphaël	30	14	7	9	41	32	+9	49	
6	Martigues	30	13	8	9	42	33	+9	47	
7	Sète	30	11	13	6	42	25	+17	46	
8	Monaco (res)	30	11	10	9	44	33	+11	43	
9	Grasse	30	9	12	9	32	31	+1	39	
10	Hyères	30	8	12	10	35	32	+3	36	
11	Nice (res)	30	10	5	15	31	48	−17	35	
12	Mont-de-Marsan	30	8	8	14	32	46	−14	32	
13	Stade Bordelais (Note: On 23 February 2018, the FFF announced that Stade Bordelais would be penalised for fielding an ineligible player in the games against Sète (at home) and Monaco (res) (away) on 10 and 17 February respectively. The original results were 1–0 and 3–1. The revised results are 0–3 and 3–0, and Stade Bordelais were deducted an additional two penalty points, one for each game. Stade Bordelais appealed, but the decision was upheld. They could still take the matter to the CNOSF.)	30	8	9	13	28	39	−11	31	
14	Marseille (res)	30	6	10	14	31	46	−15	28	
15	Tarbes (R)	30	7	5	18	32	60	−28	26	Relegation to National 3
16	Paulhan-Pézenas (Note: On 19 December 2017, the FFF announced that Paulhan-Pézenas would be deducted two points for breaking the financial rules of the competition.) (R)	30	5	8	17	19	45	−26	21	Relegation to National 3

Source: fff.fr
Rules for classification: 1) points; 2) head-to-head results; 3) head-to-head goal difference; 4) goal difference; 5) number of goals scored; 6) fair play points; 7) draw
(P) Promoted; (R) Relegated
Notes:

Group B
Pos	Team	Pld	W	D	L	GF	GA	GD	Pts	Promotion or relegation
1	Villefranche (P)	30	18	4	8	50	32	+18	58	Promotion to National
2	Annecy	30	16	9	5	51	33	+18	57	
3	Andrézieux	30	16	4	10	48	36	+12	52	
4	Jura Sud	30	15	6	9	49	41	+8	51	
5	Schiltigheim	30	14	8	8	47	35	+12	50	
6	Yzeure	30	13	7	10	33	29	+4	46	
7	Épinal	30	10	11	9	42	36	+6	41	
8	Paris Saint-Germain (res)	30	11	7	12	42	39	+3	40	
9	Belfort	30	12	3	15	43	42	+1	39 (Note: Belfort is ahead of Le Puy on head-to-head goal difference: Belfort 4–0 Le Puy, Le Puy 1–0 Belfort)	
10	Le Puy	30	9	12	9	35	35	0	39	
11	Lyon (res)	30	11	4	15	42	45	−3	37 (Note: Lyon (res) is ahead of Chasselay MDA on head-to-head points: Lyon (res) 2–1 Chasselay MDA, Chasselay MDA 1–2 Lyon (res))	
12	Chasselay MDA	30	10	7	13	34	39	−5	37	
13	Saint-Priest	30	10	5	15	35	43	−8	35	
14	St-Louis Neuweg (R)	30	8	10	12	28	43	−15	34	Relegation to National 3
15	Montceau (Note: On 12 December 2017, the FFF announced that Montceau would be deducted three points for breaking the financial regulations of the competition.) (R)	30	10	6	14	34	44	−10	33	Relegation to National 3
16	Raon-l'Étape (R)	30	2	7	21	23	64	−41	13	Relegation to National 3

Source: fff.fr
Rules for classification: 1) points; 2) head-to-head results; 3) head-to-head goal difference; 4) goal difference; 5) number of goals scored; 6) fair play points; 7) draw
(P) Promoted; (R) Relegated
Notes:

Group C
Pos	Team	Pld	W	D	L	GF	GA	GD	Pts	Promotion or relegation
1	Drancy (P)	30	15	14	1	41	17	+24	59	Promotion to National
2	Sedan (Note: The game between Furiani-Agliani and Sedan on 12 May 2018, the penultimate round of the competition, was abandoned at half time with the score 0–0, after the Sedan team refused to re-enter the field. After investigation, the FFF penalised Sedan, awarding a 3–0 victory to Furiani-Agliani and deducting a penalty point from Sedan.)	30	16	7	7	52	33	+19	54	
3	Sainte-Geneviève	30	16	6	8	41	31	+10	54	
4	Fleury	30	16	3	11	45	34	+11	51	
5	Arras FA	30	13	9	8	46	37	+9	48	
6	Saint-Maur	30	12	10	8	37	33	+4	46	
7	Bastia-Borgo (Note: The game between Bastia-Borgo and Viry-Châtillon on the final day of the season did not take place, due to Viry-Châtillon electing not to travel. This was recorded as a forfeit for Viry-Châtillon (with the deduction of a penalty point) and a 3–0 victory for Bastia-Borgo.)	30	10	14	6	33	24	+9	44	
8	Poissy	30	10	10	10	34	36	−2	40	
9	Croix	30	7	15	8	26	32	−6	36	
10	Lens (res)	30	9	7	14	46	48	−2	34 (Note: Lens (res) is ahead of Lille (res) on total goal difference.)	
11	Lille (res)	30	9	7	14	39	48	−9	34	
12	Furiani-Agliani	30	10	4	16	34	48	−14	34	
13	Reims (res)	30	7	11	12	41	43	−2	32	
14	AC Amiens (R)	30	7	9	14	18	28	−10	30	Relegation to National 3
15	Viry-Châtillon (Note: On 5 December 2017 the FFF announced that Viry-Châtillon would be deducted 3 points for breaking the financial rules of the competition. The punishment was confirmed at the appeal on 16 January 2018. The game between Bastia-Borgo and Viry-Châtillon on the final day of the season did not take place, due to Viry-Châtillon electing not to travel. This was recorded as a forfeit for Viry-Châtillon (with the deduction of a penalty point) and a 3–0 victory for Bastia-Borgo.) (R)	30	7	8	15	28	50	−22	25	Relegation to National 3
16	Beauvais (R)	30	6	6	18	31	50	−19	24	Relegation to National 3

Source: fff.fr
Rules for classification: 1) points; 2) head-to-head results; 3) head-to-head goal difference; 4) goal difference; 5) number of goals scored; 6) fair play points; 7) draw
(P) Promoted; (R) Relegated
Notes:

Group D
Pos	Team	Pld	W	D	L	GF	GA	GD	Pts	Promotion or relegation
1	Le Mans (P)	30	18	6	6	59	27	+32	60	Promotion to National
2	Saint-Brieuc	30	16	9	5	50	32	+18	57	
3	Saint-Malo	30	12	12	6	43	33	+10	48	
4	Lorient (res)	30	11	12	7	31	24	+7	45	
5	Romorantin	30	10	11	9	45	40	+5	41	
6	Saint-Pryvé (Note: On 12 December 2017 the FFF announced that Saint-Pryvé would be deducted three points for breaching the financial rules of the competition. This was reduced to one point on appeal.)	30	9	14	7	29	31	−2	40	
7	Chartres (M)	30	9	12	9	49	42	+7	39	Merged after the season.
8	Le Havre (res)	30	11	5	14	43	55	−12	38	
9	Granville	30	9	10	11	38	36	+2	37 (Note: Granville is ahead of Mantes on head-to-head goal difference: Granville 3–0 Mantes, Mantes 1–0 Granville)	
10	Mantes	30	10	7	13	32	39	−7	37	
11	Vitré	30	8	12	10	43	44	−1	36	
12	Limoges (Note: On 5 December 2017 the FFF announced that Limoges would be deducted three points for breaching the financial rules of the competition. After being placed in administration in April, Limoges were given an administrative relegation by the FFF, confirmed on 8 May 2018.) (R)	30	9	10	11	31	38	−7	34 (Note: Limoges is ahead of Boulogne-Billancourt on head-to-head goal difference: Limoges 4–2 Boulogne-Billancourt, Boulogne-Billancourt 2–1 Limoges)	Administrative relegation to National 3
13	Boulogne-Billancourt (Note: Boulogne-Billancourt were penalized (for currently unknown reasons) after the match with Fontenay on 13 January 2018. The original scoreline was 1–0. Currently, the FFF table reflects a revised scoreline of 0–3 and a penalty point deducted for Boulogne-Billancourt, however this result has not been given to Fontenay yet.)	30	10	5	15	44	58	−14	34	
14	Trélissac	30	8	9	13	26	43	−17	33	
15	Rennes (res) (R)	30	8	8	14	33	42	−9	32	Relegation to National 3
16	Fontenay (R)	30	5	10	15	25	41	−16	25	Relegation to National 3

Source: fff.fr
Rules for classification: 1) points; 2) head-to-head results; 3) head-to-head goal difference; 4) goal difference; 5) number of goals scored; 6) fair play points; 7) draw
(M) Merged after the season; (P) Promoted; (R) Relegated

== Season Outcomes ==
=== Champions and promotions ===
The champion of Championnat National 2 is decided by measuring performance of each group winner in matches against the top 6 clubs in their group.

As of 19 May 2018.

Pos	Team	Pld	Pts	GD
1	Drancy	10	23	10
2	Le Mans	10	22	13
3	Villefranche	10	22	8
4	Marignane-Gignac	10	17	3

Drancy are champions of 2017–18 Championnat National 2 and are promoted to 2018–19 Championnat National.

Le Mans, Villefranche and Marignane-Gignac are promoted to 2018–19 Championnat National.

=== Relegation ===
Paulhan-Pézenas, Raon-l'Étape, Beauvais, Fontenay, Rennes (res), Tarbes, Viry-Châtillon, Montceau, St-Louis Neuweg and AC Amiens were relegated to 2018–19 Championnat National 3 once the reprieves in the next section were taken into account.

After being placed in administration in April, Limoges were given an administrative relegation by the FFF, confirmed on 8 May 2018.

Paulhan-Pézenas and Viry-Châtillon were given additional administrative relegations by the FFF, subject to appeal, on 11 June 2018, meaning neither will contest Championnat National 3 next season.

=== Reprieves ===
Any reprieves required due to administrative relegations, mergers or clubs folding are decided by taking, in order, the 14th placed clubs ranked by order of their record against clubs finishing 9th to 13th position in their group, followed by the 15th placed clubs ranked by order of their record against clubs finishing in 10th to 14th position in their group.

On 17 October 2017 the FFF announced that due to SC Bastia not participating in the division as planned, the best 14th placed team will automatically be reprieved from relegation. Marseille (res) were reprieved from relegation.

Trélissac were reprieved from relegation due to the administrative relegation of Limoges.

==== Best 14th placed team ====
As of 19 May 2018.

Pos	Team	Pld	Pts	GD	
1	Marseille (res)	10	15	2	Reprieved
2	Trélissac	10	15	1	Reprieved
3	AC Amiens	10	12	1	
4	St-Louis Neuweg	10	10	-10	

==== Best 15th placed team ====
As of 19 May 2018.

Pos	Team	Pld	Pts	GD
1	Rennes (res)	10	17	1
2	Tarbes	10	16	1
3	Viry-Châtillon	10	11	-4
4	Montceau	10	8	-5

== Top scorers ==
As of end of season

Rank	Player	Club	Goals
1	(France) Alexandre Ramalingom	Marignane-Gignac	20
2	(France) Vincent Créhin	Le Mans	19
3	(France) Manuel Delgado	Hyères	17
4	(Ivory Coast) Mamadou Soro Nanga	Le Mans	16
4	(France) Romain Pastorelli	Furiani-Agliani	16
4	(France) Abdoul Bila	Sedan	16
7	(Algeria) Nassim Akrour	Annecy	15
7	(France) Boulaye Dia	Jura Sud	15
7	(France) Valentin Jacob	Annecy	15
10	(Ivory Coast) Oussoumane Fofana	Fleury	14
10	(France) Moussa Sylla	Monaco (res)	14
10	(France) Thomas Régnier	Belfort	14
