= Moussa Doumbia =

Moussa Doumbia may refer to:

- Moussa Doumbia (footballer, born 1989), Burkinabé football defender
- Moussa Doumbia (footballer, born 1994), Malian football midfielder
