= Antoine Abrassart =

French professional football player (born 1987)

Personal information
- Date of birth: 5 September 1987 (age 39)
- Place of birth: Saint-Dizier, France
- Height: 1.97 m (6 ft 5 1/2 in)
- Position: Defender

Team information
- Current team: Genêts Anglet

Senior career*
Years	Team	Apps	(Gls)
2006–2008	Gueugnon	1	(1)
2008–2009	Saumur	30	(0)
2009–2011	Villefranche-sur-Saône	55	(1)
2011–2013	Mont-de-Marsan	57	(5)
2013–2015	Dieppe	44	(3)
2015–2017	Mont-de-Marsan	53	(5)
2017–	Genêts Anglet	3	(0)
- * Club domestic league appearances and goals as of 24 September 2017

Antoine Abrassart (born 5 September 1987) is a French professional football player, who currently plays in the Championnat de France amateur for Genêts Anglet.

== Playing career ==
Abrassart played on the professional level in Ligue 2 for FC Gueugnon, making his debut in the 4–4 draw with Amiens on 16 May 2008. He has since played in the lower reaches of French football, representing Saumur, Villefranche-sur-Saône, Mont-de-Marsan and Dieppe.

== Career statistics ==
As of 15 November 2015.

Appearances and goals by club, season and competition
Club	Division	Season	League		Cup		League Cup		Total	
Club	Division	Season	Apps	Goals	Apps	Goals	Apps	Goals	Apps	Goals
Gueugnon	Ligue 2	2006–07	0	0	1	0	0	0	1	0
Gueugnon	Ligue 2	2007–08	1	1	0	0	0	0	1	1
Saumur	CFA2 Group G	2008–09	30	0	0	0	0	0	30	0
Villefranche-sur-Saône	CFA Group B	2009–10	28	0	2	0	0	0	30	0
Villefranche-sur-Saône	CFA Group B	2010–11	27	1	1	0	0	0	28	1
Mont-de-Marsan	CFA Group C	2011–12	27	3	1	0	0	0	28	3
Mont-de-Marsan	CFA Group C	2012–13	30	2	0	0	0	0	30	2
Dieppe	CFA Group A	2013–14	17	1	0	0	0	0	17	1
Dieppe	CFA Group A	2014–15	27	2	0	0	0	0	27	2
Mont-de-Marsan	CFA Group C	2015–16	9	0	1	0	0	0	10	0
Career totals			196	10	6	0	0	0	202	10
