= El Hassane M'Barki =

French footballer (born 2002)

Personal information
- Date of birth: May 8, 1987 (age 39)
- Position: Striker

Team information
- Current team: US Hostert

Senior career*
Years	Team	Apps	(Gls)
–2012	US Sarre-Union		
2012–2019	Sarreguemines FC	151	(79)
2019	US Sarre-Union		
2020	SSEP Hombourg-Haut		
2020	US Sarre-Union	6	(4)
2021–2023	FC Mondercange	30	(17)
2023–	US Hostert		
- * Club domestic league appearances and goals

El Hassane M'Barki (born 8 May 1987) is a French footballer who plays as a striker for US Hostert.

== Early life ==
M'Barki is of Moroccan descent.

== Career ==
M'Barki played for Luxembourgish side FC Mondercange, where he was regarded as one of the club's most important players.

== Style of play ==
M'Barki mainly operates as a striker.

== Personal life ==
M'Barki has a daughter.
