= Oumar Camara (footballer, born 1992) =

Mauritanian footballer (born 1992)

Personal information
- Full name: Oumar Camara
- Date of birth: August 19, 1992 (age 34)
- Place of birth: Montivilliers, France
- Height: 1.86 m (6 ft 1 in)
- Position: Left winger

Team information
- Current team: Nantong Zhiyun

Senior career*
Years	Team	Apps	(Gls)
2011–2012	Le Havre B	4	(0)
2012	La Vitréenne	6	(0)
2013–2014	Chartres	5	(0)
2014–2015	Gonfreville	18	(2)
2015–2018	Orléans	10	(0)
2016–2017	→ CA Bastia (loan)	28	(7)
2018	→ Lyon Duchère (loan)	9	(2)
2018–2020	Panionios	33	(2)
2020–2021	Sète	9	(3)
2021–2022	Beroe	24	(5)
2022–	Nantong Zhiyun	9	(1)

International career
2021–	Mauritania	13	(0)
- * Club domestic league appearances and goals as of 12 August 2022

Oumar Camara (born 19 August 1992) is a professional footballer who plays for Chinese Super League club Nantong Zhiyun as a midfielder. Born in France, he played for the Mauritania national team.

== Club career ==
Camara trained as a youth with Le Havre AC, making appearances with their B team and training with the professional group. On leaving Le Havre he joined La Vitréenne FC in the fifth tier at the start of the 2012–13 season, but after issues over pay and a groin injury he left in November 2013 and returned to his home to train alone.

In the summer of 2013, Camara signed for fourth-level FC Chartres. In the 2014–15 season he played with ESM Gonfreville, enjoying a "quality season", which saw him attract the attention of US Orléans, for whom he signed in July 2015.

Camara signed his first professional contract with Orléans in the summer of 2016, before being loaned out to CA Bastia for the 2016–17 season.

Following the clubs promotion, Camara made his debut at the professional level for Orléans in a 3–1 Ligue 2 win over AS Nancy on 28 July 2017. In January 2018 he joined Lyon Duchère on loan until the end of the season.

On 21 August 2018, Greek club Panionios officially announced the signing of Camara, until the end of 2018–19 season.

Released by Panionis in the summer of 2020, Camara was without a club until a successful trial with FC Sète 34 resulted in a contract.

En juillet 2021 Oumar signe en liga efbet en Bulgarie au club de Beroé où il réalise une bonne saison avec 6 goals et 4 passe décisive, durant cette année il participe à la Coupe d Afrique dés nations au Cameroun avec la sélection mauritanienne

On 12 August 2022, Camara joined China League One club Nantong Zhiyun.

== International career ==
Camara is of Mauritanian descent. He was called up to represent the Mauritania national team for a set of friendlies in June 2021. He debuted with Mauritania in a 1–0 friendly win over Liberia on 11 June 2021.

== Career statistics ==
As of match played 24 June 2023

Appearances and goals by club, season and competition
Club	Season	League			Cup		League Cup		Continental		Other		Total	
Club	Season	League	Apps	Goals	Apps	Goals	Apps	Goals	Apps	Goals	Apps	Goals	Apps	Goals
Orléans	2015–16	National	3	0	1	1	0	0	—		—		4	1
Orléans	2017–18	Ligue 2	7	0	1	0	2	0	—		—		10	0
Orléans	Total		10	0	2	1	2	0	—		—		14	1
CA Bastia (loan)	2016–17	National	28	7	5	3	—		—		—		33	10
Lyon Duchère (loan)	2017–18	National	9	2	—		—		—		—		9	2
Panionios	2018–19	Super League Greece	16	1	4	1	—		—		—		20	2
Panionios	2019–20	Super League Greece	12	0	1	1	—		—		—		13	1
Panionios	Total		28	1	5	2	—		—		—		33	3
Sète	2020–21	National	9	3	—		—		—		—		9	3
Beroe	2021–22	Bulgarian First League	22	3	2	2	—		—		—		24	5
Nantong Zhiyun	2022	China League One	9	1	0	0	—		—		—		9	1
Nantong Zhiyun	2023	Chinese Super League	0	0	1	0	—		—		—		1	0
Nantong Zhiyun	Total		9	1	1	0	—		—		—		10	1
Career total			115	17	15	8	2	0	0	0	0	0	132	25
