= Gwenn Foulon =

French footballer (born 1998)

Personal information
- Date of birth: 20 October 1998 (age 28)
- Place of birth: Quimper, France
- Height: 1.72 m (5 ft 8 in)
- Position: Forward

Team information
- Current team: Châteauroux
- Number: 9

Youth career
- 2004–2010: US Fouesnant
- 2010–2012: Concarneau
- 2012–2015: Lorient

Senior career*
Years	Team	Apps	(Gls)
2015–2020	Valenciennes B	15	(1)
2017–2020	Valenciennes	4	(0)
2017–2018	→ IC Croix (loan)	14	(3)
2018–2019	→ Bastia-Borgo (loan)	29	(18)
2019–2020	→ Bastia-Borgo (loan)	9	(1)
2020–2021	Saint-Malo	9	(1)
2021–2022	Béziers	9	(1)
2022–2023	Stade Poitevin	18	(4)
2023–2025	Bourg-Péronnas	31	(14)
2025	Bourges Foot	12	(7)
2025–	Châteauroux	4	(0)
2025–	Châteauroux B	5	(1)

International career^{‡}
2016	France U18	3	(0)
- * Club domestic league appearances and goals as of 23 June 2026 ‡ National team caps and goals as of 21:47, 26 November 2019 (UTC)

Gwenn Foulon (born 20 October 1998) is a French professional footballer who plays as a forward for Championnat National 1 club Châteauroux.

== Club career ==
Foulon joined Valenciennes in 2015. He made his professional debut for the club in a 4–0 Ligue 2 win over Orléans on 21 April 2017. In June 2017, he signed his first professional contract with the club.

In January 2018, Foulon joined IC Croix on loan for the remainder of the 2017–18 season. In July 2018, Foulon was loaned again, this time to Bastia-Borgo for the 2018–19 season. Bastia-Borgo won promotion to the Championnat National, and Foulon joined the club for a second season. At the end of the 2019–20 season, Foulon terminated his contract with Valenciennes, and signed for Saint-Malo in Championnat National 2. In June 2021, he signed for Béziers. He left the club in January 2022. In July 2025, Foulon signed for Châteauroux.

== International career ==
Foulon is a former youth international for France.
