= Tommy Plumain =

French footballer (born 2001)

Personal information
- Date of birth: 12 January 2001 (age 25)
- Place of birth: Grand-Bourg, Guadeloupe
- Height: 1.95 m (6 ft 5 in)
- Position: Goalkeeper

Team information
- Current team: Feignies Aulnoye

Youth career
- –2019: Lens

Senior career*
| Years | Team | Apps | (Gls) |
| 2019–2023 | Châteauroux II | 23 | (0) |
| 2020–2023 | Châteauroux | 13 | (0) |
| 2023–2024 | Olympic Charleroi | 6 | (0) |
| 2024– | Feignies Aulnoye | 11 | (0) |
- * Club domestic league appearances and goals as of 7 December 2024

Tommy Plumain (born 12 January 2001) is a French professional footballer who plays as a goalkeeper for Championnat National 1 club Feignies Aulnoye.

== Career ==
Plumain made his professional debut with Châteauroux in a 1–0 Ligue 2 loss to Paris FC on 20 February 2021.
