= Zakaria Grich =

French footballer (born 1996)

Personal information
- Date of birth: 9 June 1996 (age 30)
- Place of birth: Grasse, France
- Height: 1.75 m (5 ft 9 in)
- Position: Forward

Team information
- Current team: Gueugnon

Youth career
- –2015: Grasse

Senior career*
Years	Team	Apps	(Gls)
2015–2019	Chamois Niortais B	36	(16)
2016–2019	Chamois Niortais	35	(1)
2017–2018	→ Dunkerque (loan)	26	(2)
2018	→ Dunkerque B (loan)	1	(2)
2019–2020	Les Herbiers	4	(0)
2020	Les Herbiers B	2	(0)
2020–2021	Granville	8	(0)
2021–2022	Versailles	4	(0)
2022–2023	Ouest Tourangeau	23	(11)
2023–2024	Chamalières	14	(4)
2024–	Gueugnon	9	(2)
- * Club domestic league appearances and goals as of 7 December 2024

Zakaria Grich (born 9 June 1996) is a French professional footballer who plays as a forward for Championnat National 3 side Gueugnon.

== Career ==
Grich made his Ligue 2 debut for Chamois Niortais on 29 July 2016 in a 0–0 draw with Lens at the Stade René Gaillard.

On 20 June 2017, it was announced that Grich had joined National side Dunkerque for the duration of the 2017–18 season. He returned to Chamois Niortais for the 2018–19 season, where he only made 9 appearances, before leaving at the end of the season.

Grich remained without contract until 30 December 2019, where he signed with Championnat National 2 club Les Herbiers.

== Personal life ==
Born in France, Grich is of Moroccan descent.

== Career statistics ==
As of match played 5 February 2022

Appearances and goals by club, season and competition
Club	Season	League			National Cup		Other		Total	
Club	Season	Division	Apps	Goals	Apps	Goals	Apps	Goals	Apps	Goals
Chamois Niortais B	2015–16	CFA 2	18	6	—		—		18	6
Chamois Niortais B	2016–17	CFA 2	6	2	—		—		6	2
Chamois Niortais B	2018–19	National 3	12	8	—		—		12	8
Chamois Niortais B	Total		36	16	—		—		36	16
Chamois Niortais	2016–17	Ligue 2	27	0	4	0	1 (Note: Appearance in the Coupe de la Ligue)	0	32	0
Chamois Niortais	2018–19	Ligue 2	8	1	1	1	0	0	9	2
Chamois Niortais	Totals		35	1	5	1	1	0	41	2
Dunkerque (loan)	2017–18	National	26	2	2	2	—		28	4
Dunkerque B (loan)	2017–18	National 3	1	2	—		—		1	2
Les Herbiers	2019–20	National 2	4	0	0	0	—		4	0
Les Herbiers B	2019–20	National 3	2	0	—		—		2	0
Granville	2020–21	National 2	8	0	0	0	—		8	0
Versailles	2021–22	National 2	4	0	2	0	—		6	0
Career totals			116	21	9	3	1	0	126	24

== Honours ==
Versailles

- Championnat National 2: 2021–22
