= Lucas Laplace-Palette =

French association football player (born 1996)

Personal information
- Date of birth: 9 February 1996 (age 30)
- Place of birth: Pau, France
- Height: 1.77 m (5 ft 10 in)
- Position: Midfielder

Team information
- Current team: Les Genêts d'Anglet
- Number: 25

Senior career*
Years	Team	Apps	(Gls)
2016–2021	Pau II	93	(2)
2017–2021	Pau	2	(0)
2022–	Les Genêts d'Anglet	73	(13)
- * Club domestic league appearances and goals as of 9 November 2024

Lucas Laplace-Palette (born 9 February 1996) is a French professional footballer who plays as a midfielder for Championnat National 1 club Les Genêts d'Anglet.

== Career ==
Laplace-Palette made his professional debut with Pau FC in a 3–0 Ligue 2 loss to Clermont Foot on 5 December 2020.
