= Farez Brahmia =

French-Algerian footballer (born 1990)

Personal information
- Full name: Farez Brahmia
- Date of birth: 24 January 1990 (age 36)
- Place of birth: Saint-Louis, France
- Height: 1.73 m (5 ft 8 in)
- Position: Midfielder

Team information
- Current team: Mulhouse

Youth career
- 2003–2006: AS Bourgfelden
- 2006–2007: RC Strasbourg

Senior career*
Years	Team	Apps	(Gls)
2007–2009	RC Strasbourg B	33	(3)
2009–2011	RC Strasbourg	33	(1)
2012	SR Colmar B	16	(5)
2012–2013	SR Colmar	30	(3)
2013–2016	FC Mulhouse	74	(8)
2016–2018	Lyon-Duchère	40	(6)
2018–2019	Sarre-Union	18	(3)
2019–	Mulhouse	10	(1)
- * Club domestic league appearances and goals as of 20:40, 14 November 2019 (UTC)

Farez Brahmia (born 24 January 1990) (Arabic: فارس براهميا)is a French football player of Algerian origin who is currently playing as a right wing midfielder for Championnat National 1 side FC Mulhouse.

== Club career ==
In 2003, Brahmia joined the junior ranks of local side RC Strasbourg. In 2008, he was a member of Strasbourg's 18 ans team that reached the semi-finals of the Coupe Gambardella before losing to eventual champions Rennes.

At the start of the 2009-2010 season, although he only had an amateur contract, Brahmia was promoted to the Strasbourg first team. On 2 October 2009 he made his professional debut for RC Strasbourg, starting in a Ligue 2 game against Angers SCO. On 15 January 2010 he scored his first league goal for Strasbourg in a 4-1 win over Stade Lavallois. On 21 April 2010 Brahmia signed a three-year contract with the club.
