= Mamadi Baldé =

Guinea-Bissauan footballer

Mamadi
Personal information
- Full name: Mamadi Baldé
- Date of birth: 15 August 1978 (age 48)
- Place of birth: Bissau, Guinea-Bissau
- Height: 1.85 m (6 ft 1 in)
- Position: Centre back

Team information
- Current team: Moura

Senior career*
Years	Team	Apps	(Gls)
1997–1998	Sporting Bissau		
1998–2001	Beneditense	45	(1)
2001–2003	Fátima	66	(10)
2003–2010	Feirense	145	(7)
2009–2010	→ Fátima (loan)	12	(0)
2010	Pinhalnovense	4	(0)
2011	Benfica Castelo Branco	20	(1)
2011–2012	Praiense	17	(1)
2012–	Moura	121	(10)

International career
2001–2007	Guinea-Bissau		
- * Club domestic league appearances and goals as of 14 May 2017

Mamadi Baldé (born 15 August 1978 in Bissau) is a Guinea-Bissauan footballer who plays for Portuguese club Moura Atlético Clube as a central defender.
