= Mohamed Lamine Camara =

Guinean footballer

Personal information
- Date of birth: 1 January 1986 (age 40)
- Place of birth: Conakry, Guinea
- Height: 1.70 m (5 ft 7 in)
- Position: Forward

Senior career*
Years	Team	Apps	(Gls)
2002–2005	Séquence		
2006–2007	RCO Agde	2	(1)
2007–2008	Sedan	3	(0)
2008–2009	Libourne	14	(1)
- * Club domestic league appearances and goals

Mohamed Lamine Camara (born 1 January 1986) is a Guinean former footballer.

== Career statistics ==
=== Club ===
As of 23 December 2021.

Appearances and goals by club, season and competition
Club	Season	League			Cup		Other		Total	
Club	Season	Division	Apps	Goals	Apps	Goals	Apps	Goals	Apps	Goals
RCO Agde	2006–07	CFA	2	1	0	0	0	0	2	1
Sedan	2007–08	Ligue 2	3	0	1 (Note: Appearances in the Coupe de France)	0	0	0	4	0
Libourne	2008–09	Championnat National	14	1	4	1	0	0	18	2
Career total			19	2	5	1	0	0	24	3
