= Julien Leghait =

French footballer (born 1994)

Personal information
- Full name: Julien Leghait
- Date of birth: 23 March 1994 (age 32)
- Place of birth: Valenciennes, France
- Position: Midfielder

Youth career
- 2001–2003: Dutemple Valenciennes
- 2003–2007: Valenciennes
- 2007–2012: Lens

Senior career*
Years	Team	Apps	(Gls)
2012–2014	Lens	6	(0)
2014–2015	AC Ajaccio B	18	(3)
2015–2019	SC Feignies	82	(31)

International career^{‡}
2012	France U18	2	(1)
2013	France U20	5	(0)
- * Club domestic league appearances and goals as of 17 August 2012 ‡ National team caps and goals as of 13:16, 21 August 2016 (UTC)

Julien Leghait (born 23 March 1994) is a French footballer who plays for French club SC Feignies as an attacking midfielder. Leghait is a France youth international having represented his nation at under-18 level.

== Career ==
Leghait made his professional debut on 3 August 2012 in the Lens's opening league match of the 2012–13 campaign against Arles-Avignon.

Completed his playing career due to injury in October 2019 at Feignies Aulnoye FC.
