= Vincent Gragnic =

French footballer (born 1983)

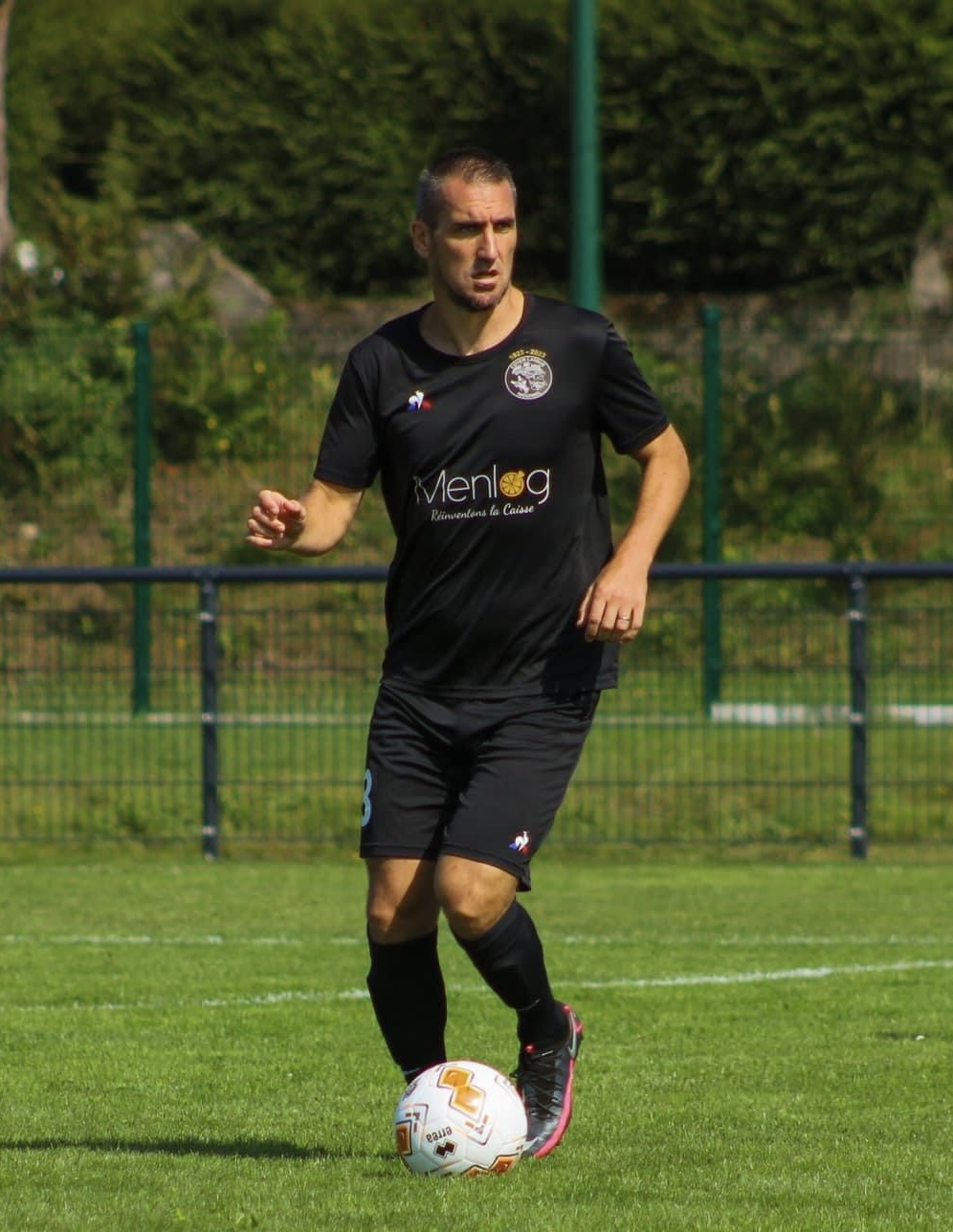

Personal information
- Full name: Vincent Gragnic
- Date of birth: June 23, 1983 (age 43)
- Place of birth: Quimperlé, France
- Height: 1.86 m (6 ft 1 in)
- Position: Attacking midfielder

Senior career*
Years	Team	Apps	(Gls)
2003–2005	Lorient	32	(2)
2005–2006	L'Entente SSG	31	(2)
2006–2007	Libourne St-Seurin	31	(6)
2007–2008	Marseille	3	(0)
2008	→ Troyes (loan)	17	(0)
2008–2011	Reims	69	(14)
2011–2012	Sedan	17	(0)
2012–2014	Nîmes	62	(26)
2014–2016	Auxerre	26	(9)
2016–2017	Strasbourg	24	(1)
Total		312	(60)
- * Club domestic league appearances and goals

Vincent Gragnic (born 23 June 1983) is a retired French footballer who played as midfielder.

== Career ==
Having left AJ Auxerre at the end of his contract, Gragnic signed a one-year deal with Strasbourg on 10 July 2016.
