= Terence Pinto =

French footballer (born 1989)

Personal information
- Date of birth: 12 September 1989 (age 37)
- Place of birth: Pau, France
- Height: 1.67 m (5 ft 6 in)
- Position: Defender

Team information
- Current team: Libourne

Senior career*
Years	Team	Apps	(Gls)
2006–2007	Saint-Médard-en-Jalles		
2007–2010	Libourne	25	(0)
2011–2012	KV Oostende	41	(4)
2012–2013	La Louvière	21	(4)
2013–2014	Lège Cap Ferret	26	(9)
2014–2019	Bergerac	111	(29)
2020–	Libourne	13	(1)
- * Club domestic league appearances and goals as of 18:48, 9 March 2022 (UTC)

Terence Pinto (born 12 September 1989) is a French professional footballer who plays as a defender for Championnat National 3 club Libourne.

== Career ==
Pinto played on the professional level in Ligue 2 for Libourne, making his debut as a second-half substitute on 12 May 2008 in the 2–5 defeat against Amiens.
