= Matthieu Chemin =

French footballer

Personal information
- Full name: Matthieu Chemin
- Date of birth: 20 April 1986 (age 40)
- Place of birth: Nantes, France
- Height: 1.81 m (5 ft 11 in)
- Position: Centre back

Team information
- Current team: Drapeau Fougères
- Number: 8

Senior career*
Years	Team	Apps	(Gls)
2004–2007	Nantes B		
2007–2008	Aurillac		
2008–2010	Libourne	48	(3)
2010–2016	Luçon	187	(4)
2016–2018	Orléans	36	(0)
2018–2020	Les Herbiers	17	(0)
2020–	Drapeau Fougères		
- * Club domestic league appearances and goals as of 15:54, 18 November 2019 (UTC)

Matthieu Chemin (born 20 April 1984) is a French footballer who plays as a defender for Drapeau Fougères.

== Career ==
In June 2016, Chemin joined Orléans, newly promoted to Ligue 2, after captaining Luçon in the third-tier Championnat National. He signed a one-year contract with an optional second.

After six months with no club, he signed with Les Herbiers in December 2018.

Chemin signed for Drapeau Fougères in June 2020.
