= Jackson Mendes =

French footballer (born 1991)

Personal information
- Full name: Jackson Mendes da Silva
- Date of birth: 4 January 1991 (age 35)
- Place of birth: Grasse, France
- Height: 1.76 m (5 ft 9 in)
- Position: Forward

Team information
- Current team: RC Grasse

Senior career*
Years	Team	Apps	(Gls)
2008–2013	Monaco B	74	(20)
2013–2015	Arles-Avignon	15	(0)
2015–2017	Bastia	62	(10)
2017–2019	AS Lyon-Duchère	38	(4)
2019–	RC Grasse	10	(1)
- * Club domestic league appearances and goals as of 16:50, 10 November 2019 (UTC)

Jackson Mendes da Silva (born 4 January 1991) is a French professional footballer who currently plays as a forward for RC Grasse.
