= 2017–18 Championnat National =

Championnat National
- Season: 2017–18
- Champions: Red Star
- Promoted: Red Star; Beziers; Grenoble
- Relegated: Créteil; Marseille Consolat; Les Herbiers
- Matches: 272
- Goals: 636 (2.34 per match)
- Top goalscorer: 15 goals Aaron Boupendza, Pau
- All statistics correct as of 20:11, 11 May 2018 (UTC).

The 2017–18 Championnat National season is the 20th season since its establishment. The fixtures were announced on 25 July 2017.

== Team changes ==
=== To National ===
Promoted from CFA

- Cholet
- L'Entente
- Grenoble
- Rodez

Relegated from Ligue 2

- Red Star
- Laval

=== From National ===
Relegated to CFA

- Épinal
- CA Bastia (merged)
- Sedan
- Belfort

Promoted to Ligue 2

- Châteauroux
- Quevilly-Rouen
- Paris FC (Note: Paris FC were promoted to fill the vacant spot created by the administrative relegation of SC Bastia from Ligue 1 to Championnat National. On 10 August, the FFF announced that SC Bastia would be denied entry to Championnat National due to financial issues. The club will therefore take the place of its reserve team in Championnat National 3 and Championnat National will operate with 17 clubs.)

=== Stadia and locations ===
Location of teams in 2017–18 National

| Club | Location | Venue | Capacity |
|---|---|---|---|
| Avranches | Avranches | Stade René Fenouillère | 2,000 |
| Béziers | Béziers | Stade de Sauclières | 12,000 |
| Boulogne | Boulogne-sur-Mer | Stade de la Libération | 15,204 |
| Chambly | Chambly | Stade des Marais | 2,500 |
| Cholet | Cholet | Stade Pierre Blouen | 9,000 |
| Concarneau | Concarneau | Stade Guy Piriou | 6,500 |
| Créteil | Créteil | Stade Dominique Duvauchelle | 12,050 |
| Dunkerque | Dunkirk | Stade Marcel-Tribut | 4,200 |
| Grenoble | Grenoble | Stade des Alpes | 20,068 |
| Laval | Laval | Stade Francis Le Basser | 18,607 |
| L'Entente | Saint-Gratien | Parc des Sports Michel Hidalgo | 8,000 |
| Les Herbiers | Les Herbiers | Stade Massabielle | 5,000 |
| Lyon-Duchère | Lyon | Stade de Balmont | 5,438 |
| Marseille Consolat | Marseille | Stade La Martine | 1,990 |
| Pau | Pau | Stade du Hameau | 13,819 |
| Red Star | Saint-Ouen | Stade Bauer | 2,999 |
| Rodez | Rodez | Stade Paul Lignon | 5,955 |

== League table ==
| Pos | Team | Pld | W | D | L | GF | GA | GD | Pts | Promotion or relegation |
|---|---|---|---|---|---|---|---|---|---|---|
| 1 | Red Star (C, P) | 32 | 15 | 11 | 6 | 41 | 25 | +16 | 56 | Promotion to Ligue 2 |
| 2 | Béziers (P) | 32 | 13 | 13 | 6 | 41 | 29 | +12 | 52 | Promotion to Ligue 2 |
| 3 | Grenoble (O, P) | 32 | 13 | 12 | 7 | 33 | 23 | +10 | 51 | Qualification to promotion play-off |
| 4 | Rodez | 32 | 12 | 9 | 11 | 33 | 33 | 0 | 45 | |
| 5 | Avranches | 32 | 11 | 10 | 11 | 39 | 42 | −3 | 43 | |
| 6 | Lyon-Duchère | 32 | 10 | 12 | 10 | 30 | 33 | −3 | 42 | |
| 7 | Boulogne (Note: Boulogne were penalised for fielding a suspended player in the game against Créteil on 17 November 2017. The game originally ended 1–1. Créteil were awarded a 3–0 victory, and Boulogne were deducted a point.) | 32 | 10 | 13 | 9 | 36 | 34 | +2 | 42 | |
| 8 | Laval | 32 | 10 | 12 | 10 | 37 | 36 | +1 | 42 | |
| 9 | Dunkerque (Note: On 28 November 2017, the FFF announced that Dunkerque would be deducted three points due to breaking the financial rules of the league. Dunkerque appealed, but the decision was upheld.) | 32 | 11 | 11 | 10 | 39 | 39 | 0 | 41 | |
| 10 | Pau | 32 | 9 | 13 | 10 | 43 | 37 | +6 | 40 | |
| 11 | L'Entente SSG | 32 | 8 | 16 | 8 | 41 | 46 | −5 | 40 | |
| 12 | Chambly | 32 | 10 | 10 | 12 | 36 | 32 | +4 | 40 | |
| 13 | Concarneau | 32 | 9 | 13 | 10 | 38 | 38 | 0 | 40 | |
| 14 | Cholet | 32 | 10 | 9 | 13 | 49 | 53 | −4 | 39 | |
| 15 | Les Herbiers (R) | 32 | 9 | 12 | 11 | 37 | 45 | −8 | 39 | Relegation to National 2 |
| 16 | Marseille Consolat (R) | 32 | 9 | 10 | 13 | 37 | 46 | −9 | 37 | Relegation to National 2 |
| 17 | Créteil (R) | 32 | 6 | 8 | 18 | 29 | 48 | −19 | 26 | Relegation to National 2 |

Source: FFF.fr
Rules for classification: 1) points; 2) head-to-head results; 3) head-to-head goal difference; 4) goal difference; 5) number of goals scored; 6) fair play points; 7) draw
(C) Champions; (O) Play-off winners; (P) Promoted; (R) Relegated

== Promotion play-off ==
A promotion play-off will be held at the end of the season between the 18th-placed 2017–18 Ligue 2 team and the 3rd-placed team of Championnat National. This will be played over two legs on 22 and 27 May 2018.

22 May 2018
20:45

| Grenoble | 2–1 | Bourg-Péronnas |
|---|---|---|
| Sotoca 1'; Elogo (red card) 69'; Belvito 83' | Report | Bègue 45+1' |

Stade des Alpes, Grenoble
Referee: Nicolas Rainville

27 May 2018
18:00

| Bourg-Péronnas | 0–0 | Grenoble |
|---|---|---|
| Sarr (red card) 90+5' | Report |

Stade Marcel-Verchère, Bourg-en-Bresse
Attendance: 4,700
Referee: François Letexier

Grenoble are promoted to 2018–19 Ligue 2

== Top scorers ==
As of 11 May 2018

| Rank | Player | Club | Goals |
|---|---|---|---|
| 1 | (Gabon) Aaron Boupendza | Pau | 15 |
| 2 | (Senegal) Jamal Thiaré | Avranches | 14 |
| 2 | (Ivory Coast) Koro Koné | Boulogne | 14 |
| 2 | (Morocco) Saïd Idazza | Concarneau | 14 |
| 5 | (Senegal) Abdoulaye Sané | Red Star | 13 |
| 6 | (Argentina) Diego Gómez | Cholet | 10 |
| 7 | (France) Romain Montiel | Chambly | 9 |
| 7 | (Senegal) Oumar Pouye | Créteil | 9 |
| 7 | (France) Alexy Bosetti | Laval | 9 |
| 7 | (Burkina Faso) Louckmane Ouédraogo | L'Entente SSG | 9 |

== Attendances ==
| # | Club | Average |
|---|---|---|
| 1 | Grenoble | 4,678 |
| 2 | Stade lavallois | 4,005 |
| 3 | Boulogne | 2,928 |
| 4 | Red Star | 2,457 |
| 5 | Rodez | 2,358 |
| 6 | Concarneau | 1,878 |
| 7 | Les Herbiers | 1,559 |
| 8 | Dunkerque | 1,199 |
| 9 | Avranches | 1,009 |
| 10 | Béziers | 998 |
| 11 | Créteil | 959 |
| 12 | Chambly | 895 |
| 13 | Pau | 886 |
| 14 | Cholet | 860 |
| 15 | Entente | 770 |
| 16 | Lyon-La Duchère | 377 |
| 17 | Consolat | 314 |
