= Rémi Sergio =

French footballer (born 1987)

Rémy Sergio
Personal information
- Date of birth: 1 December 1987 (age 38)
- Place of birth: Marseille, France
- Height: 1.68 m (5 ft 6 in)
- Position: Midfielder

Team information
- Current team: Marignane GCB
- Number: 20

Youth career
- 2002–2007: Marseille

Senior career*
Years	Team	Apps	(Gls)
2006–2007	Marseille	0	(0)
2007–2010	Charleroi	28	(0)
2010–2013	Consolat Marseille	32	(2)
2011	→ Troyes (loan)	0	(0)
2011–2012	→ Aurillac FCA (loan)	3	(2)
2013–2014	Martigues	22	(3)
2015–2016	Nîmes	10	(0)
2016–2018	Consolat Marseille	57	(3)
2018–2024	Villefranche	176	(19)
2024–	Marignane GCB	8	(0)
- * Club domestic league appearances and goals as of 23 November 2024

Rémi Sergio (born 1 December 1987) is a French professional footballer who plays for Marignane GCB.

== Career ==
Sergio played for Nîmes Olympique in Ligue 2 and for Belgian Jupiler League side R. Charleroi S.C.
