= Martin François =

French footballer (born 1996)

Personal information
- Full name: Martin François
- Date of birth: 23 December 1996 (age 29)
- Place of birth: Montbéliard, France
- Height: 1.80 m (5 ft 11 in)
- Position: Midfielder

Team information
- Current team: Kriens
- Number: 12

Youth career
- 2003–2015: Sochaux

Senior career*
Years	Team	Apps	(Gls)
2014–2020	Sochaux B	56	(7)
2015–2020	Sochaux	4	(0)
2016–2017	→ ASM Belfort (loan)	28	(2)
2018–2019	→ Dunkerque (loan)	22	(2)
2018–2019	→ Dunkerque B (loan)	6	(1)
2020	→ FC Villefranche (loan)	2	(0)
2020–2021	Louhans-Cuiseaux	8	(1)
2021–2025	Delémont	115	(24)
2025–	Kriens	40	(7)
- * Club domestic league appearances and goals as of 28 September 2026

Martin François (born 23 December 1996) is a French professional footballer who plays for Kriens.
