= Dai Baldé =

Bissau-Guinean footballer

Personal information
- Full name: Dai Rodrigo Costa Baldé
- Date of birth: 18 October 2006 (age 20)
- Place of birth: Vila Nova de Gaia, Portugal
- Height: 1.83 m (6 ft 0 in)
- Position: Defensive midfielder

Team information
- Current team: Rio Ave U23

Youth career
- 2015–2018: Estarreja
- 2018–2019: Varzim
- 2019–: Rio Ave

International career^{‡}
Years	Team	Apps	(Gls)
2025–	Guinea-Bissau	2	(0)
- ‡ National team caps and goals as of 17:15, 27 August 2025 (UTC)

Dai Rodrigo Costa Baldé (born 18 October 2006) is a Bissau-Guinean professional footballer who plays as a defensive midfielder for the Rio Ave U23s. Born in Portugal, he plays for the Guinea-Bissau national team.

== Club career ==
Baldé is a product of the youth academies of Estarreja, Varzim and Rio Ave. He was promoted to the Rio Ave U23s for the 2024–25 season.

== International career ==
Born in Portugal, Baldé is of Bissau-Guinean descent. He was called up to the Guinea-Bissau national team for a set of friendlies in June 2025. He made his debut in a 1–1 tie with Burundi on 6 June 2025.
