= Algassimou Baldé =

Guinean footballer (born 1984)

Personal information
- Date of birth: 11 October 1984 (age 42)
- Place of birth: Thiès, Senegal
- Height: 1.83 m (6 ft 0 in)
- Position: Attacking midfielder

Senior career*
Years	Team	Apps	(Gls)
2003–2004	Torcy		
2004–2005	RC Paris	12	(1)
2005–2006	Angers	18	(0)
2006–2007	US Raon-l'Étape	35	(0)
2007–2008	Beauvais	19	(0)
2008–2010	Cannes	45	(4)
2010–2011	Toulon	22	(4)
2011–2012	R.C.S. Verviétois	0	(0)
2012–2013	L'Entente SSG	22	(8)
2013–2015	Fleury-Mérogis	35	(5)
2015–2018	ES Viry-Châtillon	68	(10)
2018–2019	CS Meaux	4	(0)
2019	FC Gobelins	14	(3)
2019–2020	Noisy-le-Grand FC	10	(0)

International career
2008	Guinea	2	(0)
- * Club domestic league appearances and goals

Algassimou Baldé (born 11 October 1984) is a Guinean former professional footballer who played as an attacking midfielder. He has spent all of his career in France.

== Personal life ==
Born in Thiès, Senegal, Baldé holds citizenship from France, Guinea, and Senegal.
