= Kévin Afougou =

French footballer (born 1990)

Personal information
- Full name: Kévin Afougou Jouanneau
- Date of birth: 26 January 1990 (age 36)
- Place of birth: Aubergenville, France
- Height: 1.82 m (5 ft 11 1/2 in)
- Position: Centre-back

Team information
- Current team: Thonon Evian

Senior career*
Years	Team	Apps	(Gls)
2008–2010	Paris Saint-Germain B		
2010–2012	Paris FC	64	(0)
2012–2015	Châteauroux	44	(0)
2015	Orléans	11	(0)
2015–2017	Laval	50	(3)
2015–2016	Laval B	6	(0)
2018–2019	Boulogne-Billancourt	6	(1)
2019–	Thonon Evian	19+ (Note: Statistics are missing for the 2019–20 season.)	(1+)
- * Club domestic league appearances and goals as of 17:46, 8 June 2022 (UTC)

Kévin Afougou Jouanneau (born 26 January 1990) is a French professional footballer who plays as a centre-back for Championnat National 3 club Thonon Evian.

== Career ==
Afougou grew up in Ecquevilly, Yvelines.

He signed with Boulogne-Billancourt in December 2018.

Ahead of the 2019–20 season, Afougou joined Thonon Evian.

== Honours ==
Thonon Evian

- Championnat National 3: 2021–22
- Régional 1 Auvergne-Rhône-Alpes: 2019–20
