= Abdoul Bila =

Burkinabé footballer

Personal information
- Full name: Abdoul Sakirou Bila
- Date of birth: 6 November 1992 (age 34)
- Place of birth: Ouagadougou, Burkina Faso
- Height: 1.78 m (5 ft 10 in)
- Position: Forward

Team information
- Current team: Saint-Colomban Locminé
- Number: 19

Senior career*
Years	Team	Apps	(Gls)
- 9 Athlétic Football Club
2016–2017	Prix-lès-Mézières	22	(11)
2017	Drancy	4	(0)
2017–2018	Sedan	22	(16)
2018–2019	Lorient II	26	(11)
2018–2019	Lorient	2	(0)
2019–2020	Lyon-Duchère	11	(2)
2020–2021	Sedan	7	(2)
2021–2022	Vitré	23	(2)
2022–2023	La Roche VF	7	(3)
2023–	Saint-Colomban Locminé	46	(19)
- * Club domestic league appearances and goals as of 7 December 2024

Abdoul Sakirou Bila (born 6 November 1992) is a Burkinabé professional footballer who plays as a forward for French Championnat National 1 club Saint-Colomban Locminé.

== Club career ==
Bila began his footballing career in his native Burkina Faso with 9 Athlétic Football Club. He moved to France to continue his footballing career, and played for various teams in the lower divisions of France.

On 17 July 2018, Bila moved to the reserve side of FC Lorient. He made his professional debut for Lorient in a 1–0 Coupe de la Ligue win over Valenciennes FC on 14 August 2018.

In August 2019, Bila joined Lyon-Duchère.
