= Moussa Doumbia (footballer, born 1989) =

Burkinabé footballer

Personal information
- Full name: Moussa Doumbia
- Date of birth: 4 April 1989 (age 37)
- Place of birth: Bingerville, Ivory Coast
- Height: 1.78 m (5 ft 10 in)
- Position: Defender

Team information
- Current team: Sablé

Senior career*
Years	Team	Apps	(Gls)
2009–2012	Istres	3	(0)
2012–2018	Le Mans	86	(4)
2012–2018	Le Mans B	57	(2)
2018–2021	Granville	40	(0)
2021–	Sablé	4	(0)

International career^{‡}
2011	Burkina Faso	1	(0)
- * Club domestic league appearances and goals as of 04:19, 8 October 2021 (UTC) ‡ National team caps and goals as of 04:19, 8 October 2021 (UTC)

Moussa Doumbia (born 4 April 1989) is a Burkinabé professional footballer who plays as a defender for French fourth-tier club Sablé. He previously played for Le Mans and in Ligue 2 for FC Istres. He has been capped for the Burkina Faso national team.

== Club career ==
Doumbia moved to FC Istres in 2009 and played for Istres B in 2009–10, but failed to progress to the club's first team until the next season. He made three league appearances for Istres in the 2010–11 season, featuring against FC Metz, Stade Lavallois and AC Ajaccio. Istres lost two and drew one of these games. Doumbia also made one appearance in the 2010–11 Coupe de France for Istres, scoring in his side's 3–2 loss to Nimes Olympique in the eighth round of the competition. He moved back to Istres' "B" team for the 2011–12 season. He later scored on his first season appearance for the B team.

Doumbia signed for Le Mans in 2012 and remained with the club for six seasons before moving on to National 2 club Granville in 2018.

== International career ==
Doumbia made his debut for the Burkina Faso national team on 29 August 2011 in a 3–0 friendly defeat to South Africa.
