= Ange Digbeu =

French footballer (born 1992)

Personal information
- Full name: Ange Digbeu
- Date of birth: 29 June 1992 (age 34)
- Place of birth: Paris, France
- Height: 1.80 m (5 ft 11 in)
- Position: Defender

Team information
- Current team: Beauvais

Senior career*
Years	Team	Apps	(Gls)
2013–2015	Nice B	38	(0)
2013–2015	Nice	0	(0)
2015–2016	Fréjus Saint-Raphaël	25	(2)
2016–2018	Bourg-en-Bresse	25	(0)
2019–	Beauvais	29	(0)
- * Club domestic league appearances and goals as of 07:14, 18 January 2022 (UTC)

Ange Digbeu (born 29 June 1992) is a French professional footballer who plays as a defender for Championnat National 1 club Beauvais.

== Personal life ==
Born in France, Digbeu is of Ivorian descent.
