= Romain Montiel =

French footballer (born 1995)

Personal information
- Date of birth: 22 April 1995 (age 31)
- Place of birth: Manosque, France
- Height: 1.86 m (6 ft 1 in)
- Positions: Forward; attacking midfielder

Team information
- Current team: Créteil

Senior career*
Years	Team	Apps	(Gls)
2013–2019	Auxerre B	60	(17)
2015–2019	Auxerre	19	(0)
2017–2018	→ Chambly (loan)	22	(9)
2018–2019	→ Le Mans (loan)	22	(4)
2019	→ Le Mans B (loan)	2	(0)
2019–2020	Béziers	15	(3)
2020–2022	Bourg-Péronnas	43	(9)
2022–2025	Martigues	65	(13)
2025–	Créteil	0	(0)
- * Club domestic league appearances and goals as of 13 May 2025

Romain Montiel (born 22 April 1995) is a French professional footballer who plays as a forward for Championnat National 1 club Créteil.

== Career ==
Born in Manosque, Montiel started his youth career with Istres in 2008. Playing for the under 13s he was spotted by Auxerre, and joined the club in the summer 2010 as part of their sport studies intake. He was part of the team that won the Coupe Gambardella in 2014. In 2015 he had trials elsewhere, having been refused a place in the first team but was invite back to the training centre and scored four goals in his first game of the 2015–16 Championnat de France Amateur season. He was called into the first team training group the next day.

Montiel made his first team debut for Auxerre on 14 November 2015, in the seventh round of the 2015–16 Coupe de France, coming on as a substitute as Auxerre were giant-killed by tier 5 side Limoges. He made his Ligue 2 debut on 8 January 2016 as a late substitute in a 1–1 draw with Valenciennes.

On 27 January 2016, Montiel signed his first professional contract with Auxerre, for three years, coming into effect from June 2016. At the end of the summer 2017 transfer window, despite figuring in the previous three Ligue 2 games, he was loaned out to Championnat National side Chambly. Injured in his first training session with the club, he didn't play a game until October 2017, when he scored five goals in a 2017-18 Coupe de France preliminary rounds game against amateur opposition. Returning to Auxerre at the end of the loan after scoring 16 goals for Chambly, he was given a one-year extension of this Auxerre contract, and loaned out to another Championnat National side, Le Mans.

In June 2019, Auxerre agreed to transfer Montiel to Béziers, just relegated from Ligue 2. After one season, he left to join Bourg-en-Bresse.

On 8 June 2022, Montiel signed with Martigues. On 24 June 2025, he signed for Créteil.
