= US Sarre-Union =

Sarre-Union
- Full name: Union Sportive Sarre-Union
- Founded: 1924
- Ground: Stade Omnisports, Sarre-Union
- Capacity: 3,000
- Chairman: Laurent Weinstein
- Manager: Arnaud Bey
- League: National 3 Group I
- 2022–23: National 3 Group F, 7th

Union Sportive Sarre-Union is a French association football team founded in 1924, based in the town of Sarre-Union. Their home stadium is the Stade Omnisports in the town. As of the 2017–18 season they play in Championnat National 3, the fifth level in the French football league system.

== History ==
The club was founded in 1924.

After the war, the club played in Troisième Division Départementale and Deuxième Division Départementale, the two lowest divisions of football in Alsace.

As of the 2016–17 season, they play in the Championnat de France Amateur 2 Group D.

=== Disputed championship ===
US Sarre-Union's disputed championship
Level I	Level II	Level III	Level IV	Level V	Level VI	Level VII	Level VIII	Level IX	Level X	Level XI	Level XII
Division 1	Division 2	DH Alsace	P. Honneur	Division 1	Division 2	Division 3					
						1947-1948					
Division 1	Division 2	CFA/Division 3	DH Alsace	P. Honneur	Division 1	Division 2	Division 3				
					1949-1950						
						1951-1953					
					1953-1954						
						1954-1956					
							1956-1960				
						1960-1967					
					1967-1970						
						1970-1978					
Division 1	Division 2	Division 3	Division 4	DH Alsace	P. Honneur	Division 1	Division 2	Division 3			
						1978-1981					
							1981-1985				
Division 1	Division 2	Division 3	Division 4	DH Alsace	P. Excellence	P. Honneur	Division 1	Division 2	Division 3		
								1985-1988			
									1988-1989		
								1989-1993			
Division 1/ Ligue 1	Division 2/ Ligue 2	National 1/ National	National 2/ CFA	National 3/ CFA 2	DH Alsace	Excellence	P. Excellence	Promotion	Division 1	Division 2	Division 3
									1993-1995		
								1995-1996			
							1996-1999				
						1999-2000					
					2000-2003						
				2003-2004							
					2004-2009						
				2009-2011							
			2011-2016								
				2016-							

Professional national championship
Amateur and professional national championship
Amateur national championship
Amateur regional championship
Amateur local championship

== Current squad ==
As of 28 February 2019

Note: Flags indicate national team as defined under FIFA eligibility rules; some limited exceptions apply. Players may hold more than one non-FIFA nationality.

No.	Pos.	Nation	Player
—	GK	(France) FRA	Esteban Camilleri
—	GK	(France) FRA	Johan Schouver
—	GK	(France) FRA	Louis Deschateaux
—	DF	(France) FRA	Mohamed Al Hammaoui
—	DF	(France) FRA	Vincent Bauer
—	DF	(France) FRA	Mathieu Crouzat
—	DF	(France) FRA	Amara Keita
—	DF	(France) FRA	Joris Moustapha
—	DF	(France) FRA	Ulysse Barthelemy
—	DF	(France) FRA	Mathieu Roger
—	MF	(France) FRA	Adel Guendez

No.	Pos.	Nation	Player
—	MF	(France) FRA	Yves NToke
—	MF	(France) FRA	Martial Riff
—	MF	(France) FRA	Thomas Zerbini
—	MF	(Algeria) ALG	Chadli Amri
—	MF	(France) FRA	Amine Groune
—	MF	(France) FRA	Bastien Frassineti
—	MF	(France) FRA	Sofiane Tergou
—	FW	(France) FRA	Jean-Philippe Djé
—	FW	(France) FRA	Vianney Schermann
—	FW	(France) FRA	Farez Brahmia
—	FW	(France) FRA	Paul Maurice
