= Stade Montois (football) =

French football club

Mont-de-Marsan
- Full name: Stade Montois Rugby
- Founded: 1921
- Ground: Stade de l'Argenté, Mont-de-Marsan
- Capacity: 6,000
- Chairman: Marine Ballion
- Manager: Mathieu Robin
- League: Régional 1 Nouvelle Aquitaine
- 2022–23: National 3 Group A, 14th (relegated)
- Website: https://stade-montois.fr/football/
Home colours

Stade Montois Rugby is a French association rugby club founded in 1921. They are based in the town of Mont-de-Marsan and their home stadium is the Stade de l'Argenté, which has a capacity of 6,000 spectators. As of the 2023–24 season, they play in Régional 1.

== History ==
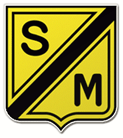
Former logo.

Stade Montois Football was formed in 1921 as the association football section of Stade Montois Club Omnisports, a 28 section multi-sport club which is best known for its rugby team.

The club was four-times consecutive champion of the Division d'Honneur South-West between 1945 and 1948, and as a result were qualified to play the first season of the national Championnat de France Amateur, the top level of amateur football in France, in the 1948–49 season. They finished top of the west group, and participated in the four-team final playoff, eventually finishing third. The club were regular participants at this level until the division was integrated into the French football pyramid at level 3 in 1971. They were relegated from the then Division 3 in 1973. In 1978 they were granted access to the newly created fourth level of French football, where they stayed until gaining promotion in 1982. They remained at the third level until the FFF reorganised the league again in 1993, when they were placed in the fourth level Championnat de France Amateur.

In 1996 the club finished top of group B of the National 2 and won promotion to the third tier once again. However another league reorganisation caused them to be returned to the fourth level, as the Championnat National restructured from two groups to one. A season later they were relegated to the fifth tier, Championnat de France Amateur 2. They won promotion as champions of their group in 2011 and played at the fourth level until 2019. They were relegated, promoted and relegated again in each of the next three completed season. The 2022–23 season brought an end to the yo-yo between divisions, with a second consecutive relegation.

The club reached the last 16 of the Coupe de France in 1927, and has reached the last 32 six times, the latest in 1995.

== Current squad ==
As of 20 November 2018

Note: Flags indicate national team as defined under FIFA eligibility rules; some limited exceptions apply. Players may hold more than one non-FIFA nationality.

| No. | Pos. | Nation | Player |
|---|---|---|---|
| — | GK | FRA | Olivier Jacques |
| 1 | GK | FRA | Christian Marques |
| 2 | DF | FRA | Valentin Girard |
| 3 | DF | FRA | Mickaël Deheegher |
| 5 | MF | FRA | Jerôme Dupouy |
| 6 | MF | FRA | Kevin Clavé |
| 7 | MF | FRA | Théo Bodet |
| 8 | MF | FRA | Simon Elissalt |
| 9 | FW | FRA | Guillaume Surot |
| 10 | MF | FRA | Nicolas Bigné |
| 11 | FW | FRA | Guillaume Surot |
| 12 | MF | FRA | Morgan Crouzet |
| 17 | DF | FRA | Damien Vignolles |
| 18 | DF | FRA | Yannick Soubieille |

| No. | Pos. | Nation | Player |
|---|---|---|---|
| 20 | DF | FRA | Dan Zampieri |
| 22 | FW | FRA | Cyril Brethous |
| 23 | MF | FRA | Ebrahim Farud |
| 24 | DF | FRA | Benjamin Lacrampe |
| 25 | FW | FRA | Anderson Maes |
| 26 | DF | FRA | Tristan Ledent |
| 27 | FW | FRA | Killian Benvindo |
| 28 | DF | FRA | Philippe Simporé |
| 29 | FW | FRA | Brandon Moenza |
| 30 | GK | FRA | Paul Taczanowski |
| 31 | FW | FRA | Loic Mata |
| 32 | MF | FRA | Romain Renard |
| — | FW | FRA | Moreno Bascle |
| — | FW | FRA | Benjamin Labadie |

== Honours ==
- Division d'Honneur South West: 1945, 1946, 1947, 1948, 1954, 1961, 1966
- Championnat de France Amateur (Premier Amateur Division): 1949 (Group winner)
- National 2/Division 4 (fourth tier): 1996 (Group winner), 1982 (Group winner)
- Championnat de France Amateur 2 (fifth tier): 2011 (Group winner)

== Notable former players ==
- (France) Jacques Foix
- (France) Joel Bats
- (France) Gaëtan Laborde (youth)
