= ES Viry-Châtillon =

French football club

- Full name: L'Entente Sportive Viry-Châtillon
- Founded: 1958
- Ground: Stade Henri Longuet; Viry-Châtillon
- Capacity: 5,700
- Chairman: Pascal Mazeau
- Manager: Stéphane Cabrelli
- League: Regional 1, Île-de-France
- 2017–18: National 2 Group C, 15th (relegated)
Home colours

L'Entente Sportive Viry-Châtillon is a French football team, based in Viry-Châtillon, Paris. It plays in Regional 1, Île-de-France, the sixth tier in the French football league system, holding home games at the Stade Henri Longuet, which has a capacity of 5,700. Their most famous ever player is Thierry Henry.

== History ==
Founded in 1958 after two local sides, L'Union Sportive de Viry, which existed between 1932 and 1958, and FC Viry, (1952–58), merged.

In 2018, the club suffered administrative relegation, in addition to relegation on the field, from Championnat National 2 after suffering financial difficulties.

== Notable players ==
- (France) Jean-Louis Coustillet
- (France) Warren Bondo (youth)
- (France) Thierry Henry (youth)
