= 2014–15 AC Ajaccio season =

Ajaccio
2014–15 season
- Chairman: Alain Orsoni
- Manager: Olivier Pantaloni
- Stadium: Stade François Coty
- Ligue 2: 13th
- Coupe de France: Round 3
- Coupe de la Ligue: Round of 16
Home colours	Away colours	Third colours

AC Ajaccio are a French football club which are based in Ajaccio. They play their home games at the Stade François Coty. During the 2014/15 campaign, they will be competing in the Ligue 2, Coupe de France, and Coupe de la Ligue.

== Competitions ==
=== Ligue 2 ===
==== League table ====
Pos	Team	Pld	W	D	L	GF	GA	GD	Pts	Promotion or Relegation
15	Tours	38	12	8	18	49	54	−5	44	
16	Valenciennes	38	10	12	16	34	51	−17	42	
17	Ajaccio	38	9	14	15	32	42	−10	41	
18	Orléans (R)	38	9	13	16	36	47	−11	40	Relegation to Championnat National
19	Châteauroux (R)	38	7	11	20	31	63	−32	32	Relegation to Championnat National

Source: Ligue 2
Rules for classification: 1) points; 2) goal difference; 3) number of goals scored
(R) Relegated

==== Results summary ====
Overall								Home						Away					
Pld	W	D	L	GF	GA	GD	Pts	W	D	L	GF	GA	GD	W	D	L	GF	GA	GD
38	9	15	14	32	42	−10	42	7	5	7	18	20	−2	2	10	7	14	22	−8

Last updated: 22 May 2015.
Source: Competitive matches

==== Results by round ====
Round	1	2	3	4	5	6	7	8	9	10	11	12	13	14	15	16	17	18	19	20	21	22	23	24	25	26	27	28	29	30	31	32	33	34	35	36	37	38
Ground	A	H	A	H	A	H	A	H	A	H	A	H	A	H	H	A	H	A	H	A	H	A	H	A	H	A	H	A	H	A	H	A	A	H	A	H	A	H
Result	D	L	W	W	D	D	D	L	L	D	D	W	L	W	D	D	W	L	L	D	L	W	D	D	D	L	L	L	L	D	W	L	L	L	L	W	D	W
Position	13	19	13	5	6	6	8	12	16	15	14	12	12	11	11	12	12	12	12	12	14	13	14	14	14	14	14	14	17	17	15	16	17	17	17	17	17	17

Source: ligue1.com
A = Away; H = Home; W = Win; D = Draw; L = Loss

==== Matches ====
1 August 2014 Match 1	Arles-Avignon	0–0	Ajaccio	Avignon
20:00	Rodriguez (yellow card) 72'	Summary	Lesoimier (yellow card) 43'; Oliech (yellow card) 48'	Stadium: Parc des Sports; Attendance: 1,428; Referee: (France) Sylvain Palhies

9 August 2014 Match 2	Ajaccio	0–2	Sochaux	Ajaccio
18:00	Babiloni (yellow card) 33'; Cavalli (yellow card) 46'; Pedretti (yellow card) 90+3'	Summary	Mignot 36'; Toko Ekambi 42'	Stadium: Stade François Coty; Attendance: 4,077; Referee: (France) Bartolomeu Varela

18 August 2014 Match 3	Gazélec Ajaccio	0–2	Ajaccio	Ajaccio
20:00	Pablo Martinez (yellow card) 17'; François (red card) 27'; Rodéric Filippi (yellow card) 42'	Summary	Fauvergue 14' (yellow card) 45+2'; Lesoimier (yellow card) 19'; Gonçalves (yellow card) 31'; Oliech 34'; Perozo (yellow card) 89'	Stadium: Stade Ange Casanova; Attendance: 3,007; Referee: (France) Wilfried Bien

22 August 2014 Match 4	Ajaccio	1–0	Tours FC	Ajaccio
20:00	Pedretti (yellow card) 52' (goal) 73'; Babiloni (yellow card) 72'; Gonçalves (yellow card) 80'	Summary	Bergougnoux (yellow card) 35'	Stadium: Stade François Coty; Attendance: 3,655; Referee: (France) Floris Aubin

29 August 2014 Match 5	Stade Lavallois	0–0	Ajaccio	Laval
20:00		Summary	Fauvergue (yellow card) 63'	Stadium: Stade Francis Le Basser; Attendance: 5,016; Referee: (France) Thomas Léonard

12 September 2014 Match 6	Ajaccio	1–1	LB Châteauroux	Ajaccio
20:00	Pedretti (yellow card) 62'; Coulibaly (yellow card) 66'; Cavalli 72'	Summary	Makengo 28'; Bonnart (yellow card) 76'	Stadium: Stade François Coty; Attendance: 4,321; Referee: (France) Johann Hamel

19 September 2014 Match 7	Auxerre	1–1	Ajaccio	Auxerre
20:00	Mulumba (yellow card) 3'; Bouby (yellow card) 25'; Baby 36'	Summary	Fauvergue 8'; Babiloni (yellow card) 53'; Coulibaly (yellow card) 64'	Stadium: Stade de l'Abbé-Deschamps; Attendance: 4,968; Referee: (France) Jerome Miguelgorry

23 September 2014 Match 8	Ajaccio	0–1	Le Havre AC	Ajaccio
20:55	Cavalli (yellow card) 36'	Summary	Le Bihan 6' (pen.); Mendes (red card) 36'; Diallo (yellow card) 90'	Stadium: Stade François Coty; Attendance: 4,119; Referee: (France) Sebastien Desiage

26 September 2014 Match 9	US Créteil	3–2	Ajaccio	Créteil
20:00	Andriatsima 19'; Diedhiou (yellow card) 42'; Essombé 86'; Bagaliy Dabo 87'	Summary	Abergel (red card) 64'; Fauvergue (yellow card) 69' (goal) 90+3'; Lesoimier 81'	Stadium: Stade Dominique Duvauchelle; Attendance: 2,304; Referee: (France) Alexandre Perreau Niel

3 October 2014 Match 10	Ajaccio	0–0	Niort	Ajaccio
20:00	Gonçalves (yellow card) 78'; Deville (yellow card) 87'; Coulibaly (yellow card) 90'	Summary	Malcuit (yellow card) 19'; Koné (yellow card) 73' (yellow-red card); Diaw (yellow card) 90+2'	Stadium: Stade François Coty; Attendance: 4,107; Referee: (France) Hamid Guenaoui

17 October 2014 Match 11	Clermont Foot	1–1	Ajaccio	Clermont-Ferrand
20:00	Lippini (yellow card) 23'; Pedretti 30' (o.g.); Mehdi Jeannin (red card) 82'	Summary	Baradji (yellow card) 10'; Marvin Diop 72'	Stadium: Stade Gabriel Montpied; Attendance: 3,783; Referee: (France) Florent Batta

24 October 2014 Match 12	Ajaccio	2–1	Valenciennes FC	Ajaccio
20:00	Oliech 28'; Cavalli (yellow card) 31'; Marvin Diop 52'; Fauvergue (yellow card) 73'	Summary	Abdul Aziz Kaboré (yellow card) 6' (yellow-red card) (goal) 25'; Abriel (yellow card) 40'	Stadium: Stade François Coty; Attendance: 4,234; Referee: (France) Stephane Jochem

31 October 2014 Match 13	Dijon FCO	3–0	Ajaccio	Dijon
20:00	Loïs Diony (yellow card) 51' (goal) 59'; Júlio Tavares 68'; Amalfitano 75' (pen.); Rémy (red card) 78'	Summary	Babiloni (yellow card) 29'; Cavalli (yellow card) 44'; Bergorgi (yellow card) 74'; Gonçalves (yellow card) 86'	Stadium: Stade Gaston Gérard; Attendance: 9,160; Referee: (France) Yohann Rouinsard

7 November 2014 Match 14	Ajaccio	2–1	Troyes AC	Ajaccio
20:00	Cavalli (yellow card) 26'; Fauvergue 71'; Perozo (yellow card) 74'; Oliech 86'; Lesoimier (yellow card) 90+3'	Summary	Gimbert 14' (yellow card) 74'; Thiago (yellow card) 39'	Stadium: Stade François Coty; Attendance: 4,133; Referee: (France) Jean Cailleux

21 November 2014 Match 15	Ajaccio	1–1	Angers SCO	Ajaccio
20:00 CET	Abergel (yellow card) 39'; Fauvergue 59'	Summary	Boufal (yellow card) 35'; Perozo 76' (o.g.)	Stadium: Stade François Coty; Attendance: 4,147; Referee: (France) Alexandre Perreau Niel

28 November 2014 Match 16	US Orléans	1–1	Ajaccio	Orléans
20:00 CET	Fauvergue 32' (o.g.)	Summary	Fauvergue 14' (pen.) (yellow card) 88'; Gonçalves (yellow card) 17'; Scribe (yellow card) 39'; Kanté (yellow card) 71'	Stadium: Stade de la Source; Attendance: 3,892; Referee: (France) Johan Hamel

12 December 2014 Match 17	Ajaccio	2–0	AS Nancy	Ajaccio
20:00 CET	Fauvergue 3' (yellow card) 63'; Oliech 30'; Babiloni (yellow card) 47'	Summary	Ibrahim Amadou (yellow card) 16'; Dalé (yellow card) 18'	Stadium: Stade François Coty; Attendance: 4,046; Referee: (France) William Lavis

20 December 2014 Match 18	Stade Brestois 29	2–1	Ajaccio	Brest, France
14:00 CET	Grougi 23' (pen.) 49' (pen.); Belghazouani (yellow card) 65'	Summary	Coulibaly (yellow card) 15'; Scribe (yellow card) 23'; Gonçalves (yellow card) 38'; Babiloni (yellow card) 51'; Cavalli 64'; Abergel (yellow card) 84'	Stadium: Stade Francis-Le Blé; Attendance: 7,318; Referee: (France) Stéphanie Frappart

9 January 2015 Match 19	Ajaccio	0–1	Nîmes Olympique	Ajaccio
20:00 CET	Fauvergue (yellow card) 54'; Cavalli (yellow card) 65'; Babiloni (yellow card) 90+1'	Summary	Nouri 48'	Stadium: Stade François Coty; Attendance: 4,060; Referee: (France) Floris Aubin

17 January 2015 Match 20	Sochaux	1–1	Ajaccio	Montbéliard
14:00 CET	Matheus Coradini Vivian (yellow card) 59'; Butin 71'; Kharja (yellow card) 90+3'	Summary	Cavalli (yellow card) 17'; Begeorgi (yellow card) 57' (yellow-red card); Diop (yellow card) 60'; Kanté (yellow card) 75'; Madri 90+4'	Stadium: Stade Auguste Bonal; Attendance: 7,896; Referee: (France) Olivier Husset

23 January 2015 Match 21	Ajaccio	0–3	Gazélec Ajaccio	Ajaccio
20:00 CET	Pedretti (yellow card) 31'; Perozo (yellow card) 50'	Summary	Pujol (yellow card) 8' (goal) 53'; Poggi 22'; Pablo Martinez (yellow card) 28'; Mayi 86'	Stadium: Stade François Coty; Attendance: 6,525; Referee: (France) Amaury Delerue

30 January 2015 Match 22	Tours FC	0–2	Ajaccio	Tours
20:00 CET	Cillard (yellow card) 24'; Touré (yellow card) 40'	Report	Fauvergue 4', (yellow card) 76'; Pedretti 25', (yellow card) 38'; Marester (yellow card) 51'; Lesoimier (yellow card) 73'	Stadium: Stade de la Vallée du Cher; Attendance: 3,776; Referee: (France) Aurélien Petit

6 February 2015 Match 23	Ajaccio	0–0	Stade Lavallois	Ajaccio
20:00 CET		Summary	Gonçalves (yellow card) 43'; Guerriero (yellow card) 72'	Stadium: Stade François Coty; Attendance: 3,980; Referee: (France) William Lavis

13 February 2015 Match 24	LB Châteauroux	0–0	Ajaccio	Châteauroux
20:00 CET	Zola (yellow card) 51'; Bain (yellow card) 73'	Summary	Kanté (yellow card) 29'; Begeorgi (yellow card) 62'; Sainati (yellow card) 77'	Stadium: Stade Gaston Petit; Attendance: 4,797; Referee: (France) Florent Batta

20 February 2015 Match 25	Ajaccio	1–1	Auxerre	Ajaccio
20:00 CET	Fauvergue 5' (yellow card) 29'; Cavalli (red card) 13'	Summary	Diarra (yellow card) 16'; Gragnic 45'; Fontaine (red card) 47'; Puygrenier (yellow card) 75'	Stadium: Stade François Coty; Attendance: 4,076; Referee: (France) Stéphane Jochem

27 February 2015 Match 26	Le Havre AC	2–1	Ajaccio	Le Havre
20:00 CET	Touré (red card) 10'; Issam Chebake (yellow card) 36'; Bonnet 63'; Le Bihan 77'	Summary	Videmont 12' (pen.) (yellow card) 29'; Madri (yellow card) 20'; Fauvergue (yellow card) 44'	Stadium: Stade Océane; Attendance: 5,676; Referee: (France) Sylvain Palhies

6 March 2015 Match 27	Ajaccio	0–1	US Créteil-Lusitanos	Ajaccio
20:00 CET	Gonçalves (yellow card) 72'	Summary	N'Doye 16'; Esor (yellow card) 49'	Stadium: Stade François Coty; Attendance: 3,523; Referee: (France) Sébastien Desiage

13 March 2015 Match 28	Niort	1–0	Ajaccio	Niort
20:00 CET	Koné 19'; Yoann Barbet (yellow card) 70'; Dona Ndoh (yellow card) 90+1'	Summary	Begeorgi (yellow card) 45'; Sainati (yellow card) 58'	Stadium: Stade René Gaillard; Attendance: 4,188; Referee: (France) Jérôme Miguelgorry

20 March 2015 Match 29	Ajaccio	1–2	Clermont Foot	Ajaccio
20:00 CET	Leca (yellow card) 17'; Sainati (yellow card) 25'; Diop 56'; Fauvergue (yellow card) 65'; Marester (red card) 90+4'	Summary	Hunou 22'; Brandon Agounon (yellow card) 32'; Jordan N'Kololo (yellow card) 67'; Dugimont 86'; Hugo Konongo (yellow card) 90'	Stadium: Stade François Coty; Attendance: 4,028; Referee: (France) Olivier Thual

3 April 2015 Match 30	Valenciennes FC	1–1	Ajaccio	Valenciennes
20:00 CET	Le Tallec 6' (yellow card) 45+5'; Ciss (red card) 44'; Abdul Aziz Kaboré (yellow card) 63'	Summary	Madri (yellow card) 45+5'; Fauvergue 55'; Perozo (yellow card) 70'; Hugo Aine (yellow card) 75'; Begeorgi (yellow card) 89'	Stadium: Stade du Hainaut; Attendance: 7,098; Referee: (France) Sébastien Moreira

10 April 2015 Match 31	Ajaccio	1–0	Dijon FCO	Ajaccio
20:00 CET	Cavalli 71' (pen.); Diop (yellow card) 83'	Summary	Rémy (yellow card) 17'; Bamba (yellow card) 43' (yellow-red card)	Stadium: Stade François Coty; Attendance: 4,062; Referee: (France) Benoît Millot

17 April 2015 Match 32	Troyes AC	2–0	Ajaccio	Troyes
20:00 CET	Ayasse 22' (yellow card) 79'; Pi 80'; Saunier (yellow card) 90'	Summary	Sainati (yellow card) 54'; Videmont (yellow card) 90+1'	Stadium: Stade de l'Aube; Attendance: 8,375; Referee: (France) Florent Batta

24 April 2015 Match 33	Angers SCO	1–0	Ajaccio	Angers
20:00 CET	Sacha Clemence 28'	Summary	Sainati (yellow card) 30'; Abergel (yellow card) 44'	Stadium: Jean-Bouin Stadium, Angers; Attendance: 10,645; Referee: (France) Nicolas Rainville

28 April 2015 Match 34	Ajaccio	2–3	US Orléans	Ajaccio
20:30 CET	Fauvergue 7' (yellow card) 62'; Videmont 16'; Sainati (yellow card) 42'; Marester (yellow card) 66'	Summary	Delonglée (yellow card) 45+1' (goal) 73'; Jean-Paul Mendy 51'; Brillault 58'	Stadium: Stade François Coty; Attendance: 4,138; Referee: (France) Alexandre Castro

1 May 2015 Match 35	AS Nancy	2–0	Ajaccio	Tomblaine
20:00 CET	Walter (yellow card) 8'; Hadji 45+2'; Lenglet (yellow card) 50'; Coulibaly 70'	Summary	Marester (yellow card) 17'; Hugo Aine (yellow card) 30'; Scribe (yellow card) 45+2'; Pedretti (yellow card) 82'; Warren Caddy (yellow card) 85'	Stadium: Stade Marcel Picot; Attendance: 15,552; Referee: (France) Floris Aubin

8 May 2015 Match 36	Ajaccio	2–1	Stade Brestois 29	Ajaccio
20:00 CET	Videmont 7'; Cavalli 32'; Abergel (yellow card) 53'; Sainati (yellow card) 60'; Cissé (yellow card) 83'	Summary	Ramaré (yellow card) 29'; Hamdi 64'; Touré (yellow card) 86'	Stadium: Stade François Coty; Attendance: 3,744; Referee: (France) Fredy Fautrel

15 May 2015 Match 37	Nîmes Olympique	1–1	Ajaccio	Nîmes
20:30 CET	Vlachodimos (yellow card) 53'; Maoulida 75'; Robail (yellow card) 85'	Summary	Begeorgi (yellow card) 24'; Cavalli (yellow card) 28'; Videmont 42'	Stadium: Stade des Costières; Attendance: 4,327; Referee: (France) Sébastien Desiage

22 May 2015 Match 38	Ajaccio	2–1	Arles-Avignon	Ajaccio
20:30 CET	Fauvergue 13' (yellow card) 90+1' (red card) 90+1'; Cavalli (yellow card) 45'; Videmont 52'; Guillaume Fanucchi (yellow card) 84'	Summary	Cissé 65'; Domoraud (yellow card) 75'	Stadium: Stade François Coty; Attendance: 4,492; Referee: (France) Amaury Delerue

=== Coupe de France ===
15 November 2014 Round 1	Olympique Alès	0–1	Ajaccio	Alès
19:00 CET		Summary		Stadium: Stade Pierre Pibarot

6 December 2014 Round 2	Borgo FC	2–3 (a.e.t.)	Ajaccio	Borgo, Haute-Corse
14:00 CET	Marester 20' (o.g.); Dimitri Lesueur (yellow card) 33'; Steven Inzerillo 71'	Summary	Mouaad Madri 30'; Babiloni (yellow card) 58' (goal) 72'; Fauvergue 94'	Stadium: Stade Paul-Antoniotti; Attendance: 1,200; Referee: (France) Mehdi Mokhtari

4 January 2015 Round 3	Consolat Marseille	3–0	Ajaccio	Marseille
14:15 CET	David Gigliotti (yellow card) 17' (goal) 80'; Anthony Arlaud (yellow card) 30'; Abdoul Diawara 35'; Marek Amiri 42'; Faiz Selemanie (yellow card) 60'; Thomas Wilwert (yellow card) 85'	Summary	Madri (yellow card) 19'	Stadium: Stade La Martin; Attendance: 1,800; Referee: (France) Said Ennjimi

=== Coupe de la Ligue ===
26 August 2014 Round 2	Troyes AC	1–4	Ajaccio	Troyes
20:00	Rincón (yellow card) 39'; Karim Azamoum 67'; Gope-Fenepej (yellow card) 69'	Summary	Mouaad Madri 52'; Fauvergue 54'; Oliech 59' 65'; Gonçalves (yellow card) 63'	Stadium: Stade de l'Aube; Attendance: 6,904; Referee: (France) Stephane Jochem

28 October 2014 Round 3	Montpellier	0–1	Ajaccio	Montpellier
20:00	Hilton (yellow card) 36'; Mounier (yellow card) 78'	Summary	Abergel (yellow card) 37'; Mouaad Madri 44'	Stadium: Stade de la Mosson; Attendance: 7,386; Referee: (France) Sebastien Moreira

17 December 2014 Last 16	Ajaccio	1–3	Paris Saint-Germain	Ajaccio
21:00	Cavalli 26' (pen.); Gonçalves (yellow card) 37'; Mouaad Madri (yellow card) 63'	Summary	Chantôme (yellow card) 44'; Lavezzi (yellow card) 52'; Cavani 54'; Aurier 79'; Bahebeck 83'	Stadium: Stade François Coty; Attendance: 4,980; Referee: (France) Stéphane Lannoy
