= 2014–15 Coupe de la Ligue =

French League Cup

Tournament details
- Country: France
- Teams: 42

Final positions
- Champions: Paris Saint-Germain (5th title)
- Runners-up: Bastia

Tournament statistics
- Matches played: 41
- Goals scored: 124 (3.02 per match)
- Top goal scorer(s): Edinson Cavani; Djibril Cissé; Quentin N'Gakoutou (3 goals each)

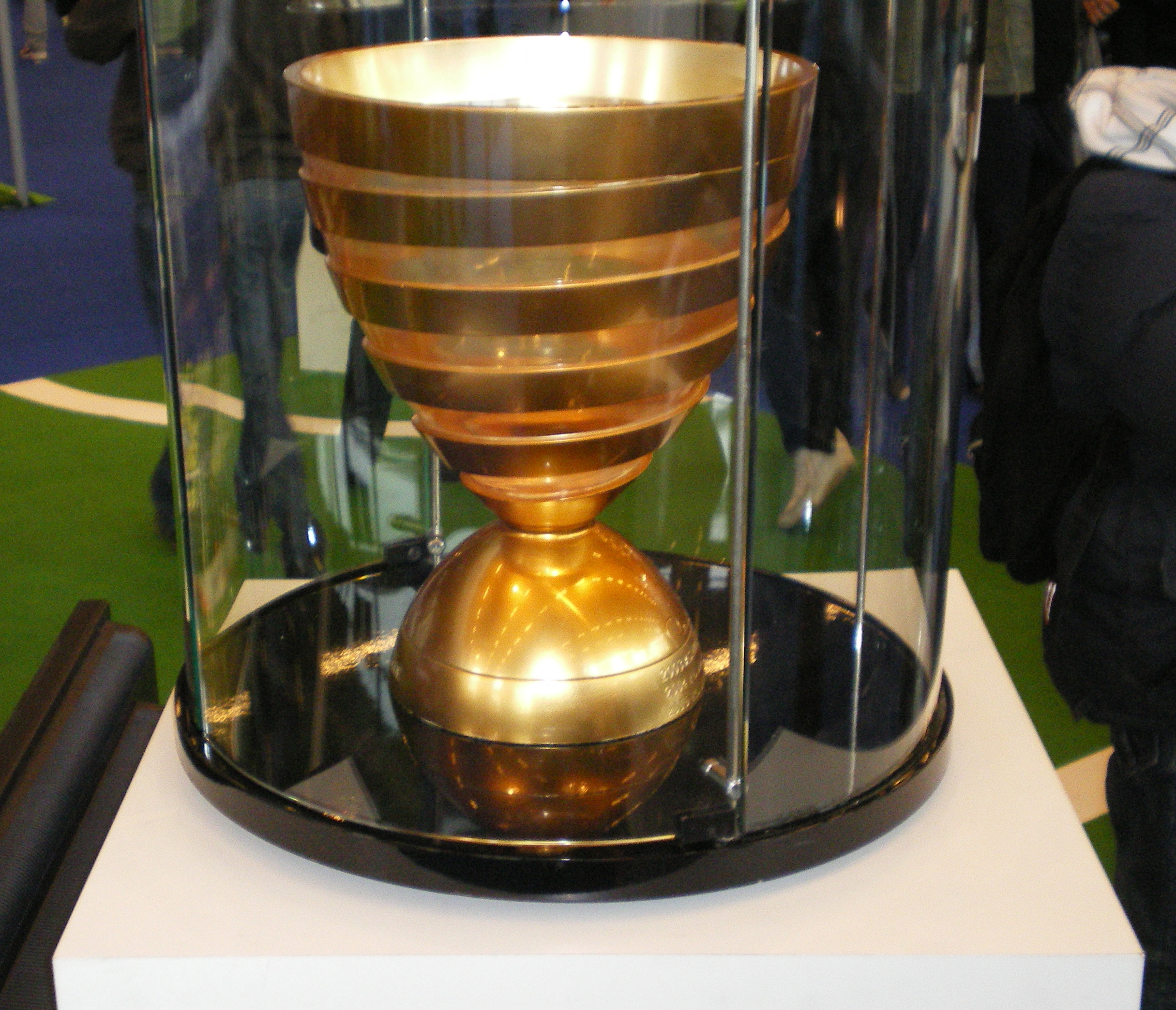
The second trophy of the League Cup

The 2014–15 Coupe de la Ligue was the 21st edition of the French league cup competition. The competition was organized by the Ligue de Football Professionnel and was open to the 44 professional clubs in France that are managed by the organization.

Paris Saint-Germain were the reigning champions, having defeated Lyon 2–1 in the previous season's final for a record-breaking fourth title. They won their record-extending fifth on 11 April, defeating Bastia 4–0 in the final.

== First round ==
First round matches were held over 1 day; 12 of August 2014. The 10 winners secured places in the second round.

12 August 2014	Valenciennes (2)	1–3	Troyes (2)	Valenciennes
	Nguette 56'		Gimbert 23'; Ayasse 58'; Darbion 74'	Stadium: Stade du Hainaut; Attendance: 4,640; Referee: Olivier Thual

12 August 2014	Tours (2)	2–2 (a.e.t.) (2–4 p)	Dijon (2)	Tours
	Diaz 6'; Adnane 64'		Diony 66'; Babit 71'	Stadium: Stade de la Vallée du Cher; Attendance: 3,578; Referee: Sylvain Palhies
	Penalties
	Chavalerin (penalty missed); Ketkeophomphone (penalty scored); Bouhours (penalty missed); Fontaine (penalty scored)		Philippoteaux (penalty scored); Varrault (penalty scored); Gastien (penalty scored); Diony (penalty scored)

12 August 2014	Laval (2)	2–0	Sochaux (2)	Laval
	Robic 11'; Gonçalves 90+3'			Stadium: Stade Francis Le Basser; Attendance: 5,737; Referee: Alexandre Castro

12 August 2014	Nancy (2)	2–1	Le Havre (2)	Tomblaine
	Coulibaly 12'; Grange 45'		Manzala 55'	Stadium: Stade Marcel Picot; Attendance: 12,579; Referee: Sébastien Moreira

12 August 2014	Arles (2)	3–2	Niort (2)	Avignon
	Ngakoutou 19', 54', 86'		Koné 24', 70'	Stadium: Parc des Sports; Attendance: 1,093; Referee: Alexandre Perreau Niel

12 August 2014	Clermont (2)	1–0	Istres (3)	Clermont-Ferrand
	Capelle 5'			Stadium: Stade Gabriel Montpied; Attendance: 1,962; Referee: Romain Delpech

12 August 2014	Orléans (2)	1–1 (a.e.t.) (3–4 p)	Auxerre (2)	Orléans
	Maah 45+4'		Chérif 44'	Stadium: Stade de la Source; Attendance: 4,089; Referee: Yohann Rouinsard
	Penalties
	Louisy-Daniel (penalty missed); Glombard (penalty scored); Loval (penalty missed); Delonglée (penalty scored); Tomas (penalty scored)		Lefebvre (penalty scored); Haller (penalty scored); Ben Idir (penalty missed); Boly (penalty scored); Viale (penalty scored)

12 August 2014	Angers (2)	2–1	Nîmes (2)	Angers
	Blayac 7'; Thomas 90+1'		Nouri 10'	Stadium: Jean-Bouin Stadium; Attendance: 4,425; Referee: Amaury Delerue

12 August 2014	CA Bastia (3)	1–2 (a.e.t.)	Créteil (2)	Furiani
	Ripart 108'		Diedhiou 96'; Essombé 105'	Stadium: Stade Armand Cesari; Attendance: 450; Referee: Didier Falcone

12 August 2014	Brest (2)	1–1 (a.e.t.) (2–4 p)	Gazélec Ajaccio (2)	Brest
	Grougi 90+1'		Larbi 64'	Stadium: Stade Francis-Le Blé; Attendance: 4,917; Referee: William Lavis
	Penalties
	Moimbé (penalty scored); Ramaré (penalty missed); Perez (penalty scored); Grougi (penalty missed)		Martinez (penalty scored); François (penalty scored); Mayi (penalty scored); Ducourtioux (penalty scored)

== Second round ==
The round featured the 10 winners of the first-round matches, plus Ajaccio and Châteauroux, who were exempt from the first round. The matches were contested on 26 August 2014.

26 August 2014	Auxerre (2)	3–0	Nancy (2)	Auxerre
	Viale 9', 41' (pen.), 73'			Stadium: Stade de l'Abbé-Deschamps; Referee: Sébastien Desiage

26 August 2014	Châteauroux (2)	1–3	Clermont (2)	Châteauroux
	Thil 19'		Sawadogo 35'; Novillo 82'; Saadi 90'	Stadium: Stade Gaston-Petit; Referee: Sébastien Desiage

26 August 2014	Angers (2)	1–2	Arles (2)	Angers
	Eudeline 24'		Hammar 66', 75'	Stadium: Stade Jean Bouin; Attendance: 3,584; Referee: Johann Hamel

26 August 2014	Laval (2)	1–0	Dijon (2)	Laval
	Diallo 51'			Stadium: Stade Francis Le Basser; Attendance: 3,824; Referee: Floris Aubin

26 August 2014	Créteil (2)	2–1	Gazélec Ajaccio (2)	Furiani
	Seck 34'; Piquionne 80'		François 45'	Stadium: Stade Dominique Duvauchelle; Attendance: 1,812; Referee: Olivier Husset

26 August 2014	Troyes (2)	1–4	Ajaccio (2)	Troyes
	Azamoum 67'		Madri 52'; Fauvergue 54'; Oliech 59', 65'	Stadium: Stade de l'Aube; Attendance: 6,904; Referee: Stephane Jochem

== Third round ==
The round features the 6 winners of the second round matches in addition to 14 Ligue 1 clubs who were not participating in the European competitions. The matches were contested on 28 and 29 October 2014.

28 October 2014	Evian (1)	1–2	Lorient (1)	Annecy
20:00 CET	Wass 8'		Lavigne 15'; Ayew 73'	Stadium: Parc des Sports, Annecy; Attendance: 4,526; Referee: Clement Turpin

28 October 2014	Reims (1)	2–3 (a.e.t.)	Arles (2)	Reims
20:00 CET	de Préville 29'; Courtet 90'		Niang 63'; Savanier 81'; Ouaamar 102'	Stadium: Stade Auguste Delaune; Attendance: 7,336; Referee: Antony Gautier

28 October 2014	Montpellier (1)	0–1	Ajaccio (2)	Montpellier
20:00 CET			Madri 44'	Stadium: Stade de la Mosson; Attendance: 7,386; Referee: Sebastien Moreira

28 October 2014	Caen (1)	4–3 (a.e.t.)	Clermont (2)	Caen
20:00 CET	Féret 55'; Duhamel 72', 120+1'; Bazile 83'		Dugimont 49'; Novillo 61'; Diogo 88'	Stadium: Stade Michel d'Ornano; Attendance: 8,635; Referee: Bartolomeu Varela

28 October 2014	Nantes (1)	4–0	Laval (2)	Nantes
20:00 CET	Shechter 4', 90+1'; Bessat 57'; Bangoura 72'			Stadium: Stade de la Beaujoire; Attendance: 24,551; Referee: Sebastien Desiage

28 October 2014	Lens (1)	0–2	Créteil (2)	Amiens
20:00 CET			Lesage 58'; Genest 87'	Stadium: Stade de la Licorne; Attendance: 3,848; Referee: Alexandre Castro

28 October 2014	Bastia (1)	3–1	Auxerre (2)	Bastia
20:00 CET	Ayité 58'; Cissé 64', 71'		Mbombo 13'	Stadium: Stade Armand Cesari; Attendance: 4,381; Referee: Amaury Delerue

28 October 2014	Toulouse (1)	1–3	Bordeaux (1)	Toulouse
21:00 CET	Akpa Akpro 84'		Pallois 17'; Contento 24'; Diabaté 68'	Stadium: Stadium Municipal; Attendance: 11,331; Referee: Fredy Fautrel

29 October 2014	Nice (1)	3–3 (a.e.t.) (2–3 p)	Metz (1)	Nice
18:30 CET	Maupay 20'; Bosetti 37'; Cvitanich 88' (pen.)		Palomino 5'; Ngbakoto 13'; Vion 17'	Stadium: Allianz Riviera; Attendance: 9,560; Referee: Ruddy Buquet
	Penalties
	Bodmer (penalty missed); Cvitanich (penalty missed); Pléa (penalty scored); Eysseric (penalty scored); Bosetti (penalty missed)		Malouda (penalty missed); Doukouré (penalty scored); Marchal (penalty scored); Palomino (penalty scored)

29 October 2014	Rennes (1)	2–1	Marseille (1)	Rennes
20:45 CET	Konradsen 60'; Hosiner 90+3'		Batshuayi 19'	Stadium: Stade de la Route de Lorient; Attendance: 26,660; Referee: Said Ennjimi

== Round of 16 ==
The draw for the Round of 16 of the 2014–15 edition of the Coupe de la Ligue was held on 5 November 2014. The round featured the ten winners of the third round matches and the six Ligue 1 clubs that qualified for European competition in the 2013–14 season. The matches were contested on 16 and 17 December 2014.

16 December 2014	Bastia (1)	3–2 (a.e.t.)	Caen (1)	Bastia
18:00 CET	Gillet 42'; Koné 89'; Mokulu 103'		Privat 12'; Saez 72'	Stadium: Stade Armand Cesari; Attendance: 3,034; Referee: Philippe Kalt

16 December 2014	Nantes (1)	4–2 (a.e.t.)	Metz (1)	Nantes
21:00 CET	Vizcarrondo 71'; Gakpé 83' (pen.); Audel 92'; Bangoura 118'		Falcón 60'; Doukouré 62'	Stadium: Stade de la Beaujoire; Attendance: 12,601; Referee: Nicolas Rainville

17 December 2014	Lorient (1)	0–1	Saint-Étienne (1)	Lorient
18:40 CET			Hamouma 48'	Stadium: Stade du Moustoir; Attendance: 9,015; Referee: Benoît Bastien

17 December 2014	Arles-Avignon (2)	0–2	Guingamp (1)	Avignon
21:00 CET			Mandanne 13'; Beauvue 68'	Stadium: Parc des Sports; Attendance: 1,676; Referee: Wilfried Bien

17 December 2014	Rennes (1)	1–0	Créteil (2)	Rennes
21:00 CET	Armand 69'			Stadium: Stade de la Route de Lorient; Attendance: 12,300; Referee: Mickael Lesage

17 December 2014	Lyon (1)	1–1 (a.e.t.) (4–5 p)	Monaco (1)	Lyon
21:00 CET	Lacazette 105'		Carrasco 94'	Stadium: Stade Gerland; Attendance: 21,541; Referee: Antony Gautier
	Penalties
	Gonalons (penalty scored); Lacazette (penalty scored); Ghezzal (penalty scored); Koné (penalty missed); Umtiti (penalty scored); Ferri (penalty missed)		(penalty missed) Toulalan; (penalty scored) López; (penalty scored) Martial; (penalty scored) Fabinho; (penalty scored) Bernardo; (penalty scored) Ocampos

17 December 2014	Lille (1)	1–1 (a.e.t.) (6–5 p)	Bordeaux (1)	Lille
21:00 CET	Frey 30'		Mariano 16'	Stadium: Stade Pierre-Mauroy; Attendance: 10,035; Referee: Clément Turpin
	Penalties
	Balmont (penalty missed); Meïté (penalty scored); Rodelin (penalty scored); Sidibé (penalty missed); Mendes (penalty scored); Origi (penalty missed); Enyeama (penalty scored); Rozehnal (penalty scored); Souaré (penalty scored)		(penalty scored) Sertic; (penalty missed) Faubert; (penalty missed) Plašil; (penalty scored) Touré; (penalty scored) Diabaté; (penalty missed) Pallois; (penalty scored) Sané; (penalty scored) Traoré; (penalty missed) Mariano

17 December 2014	Ajaccio (2)	1–3	Paris Saint-Germain (1)	Ajaccio
21:00 CET	Cavalli 27' (pen.)		Cavani 54'; Aurier 80'; Bahebeck 84'	Stadium: Stade François Coty; Attendance: 4,980; Referee: Stéphane Lannoy

== Quarter-finals ==
The draw for the quarter-finals was held 17 December 2014 following the conclusion of the Round of 16 matches. The round featured the eight winners of the Round of 16 matches and were contested on 13 and 14 January 2015.

13 January 2015	Bastia (1)	3–1	Rennes (1)	Bastia
18:40	Squillaci 46'; Danzé 71' (o.g.); Cissé 90'		Armand 12'	Stadium: Stade Armand Cesari; Attendance: 4,836; Referee: Clément Turpin

13 January 2015	Saint-Étienne (1)	0–1	Paris Saint-Germain (1)	Saint-Etienne
21:00			Ibrahimović 72'	Stadium: Stade Geoffroy Guichard; Attendance: 28,855; Referee: Saïd Ennjimi

14 January 2015	Monaco (1)	2–0	Guingamp (1)	Monaco
17:00	Berbatov 8'; Martial 90+4'			Stadium: Stade Louis II; Attendance: 4,785; Referee: Nicolas Rainville

14 January 2015	Lille (1)	2–0	Nantes (1)	Lille
	Corchia 9'; Kjær 69'			Stadium: Stade Pierre-Mauroy; Attendance: 11,106; Referee: Ruddy Buquet

== Semi-finals ==
The draw for the semi-finals was held on 14 January 2015 following the conclusion of the quarter-finals matches. The round featured the four winners of the quarter-final matches and were contested on 3 and 4 February 2015.

3 February 2015	Lille (1)	0–1	Paris Saint-Germain (1)	Lille
			Maxwell 27'	Stadium: Stade Pierre-Mauroy; Attendance: 41,977; Referee: Lionel Jaffredo

4 February 2015	Monaco (1)	0–0 (a.e.t.) (6–7 p)	Bastia (1)	Monaco
				Stadium: Stade Louis II; Attendance: 8,260; Referee: Antony Gautier
	Penalties
	Martial (penalty scored); Bernardo Silva (penalty missed); Fabinho (penalty scored); Kurzawa (penalty scored); João Moutinho (penalty missed); Toulalan (penalty scored); Traoré (penalty scored); Echiéjilé (penalty scored); Dirar (penalty missed)		(penalty scored) Boudebouz; (penalty missed) Gillet; (penalty missed) Sio; (penalty scored) Modesto; (penalty scored) Palmieri; (penalty scored) Marange; (penalty scored) Ongenda; (penalty scored) Cioni; (penalty scored) Squillaci

== Final ==
The final was held on 11 April 2015 at the Stade de France, Saint-Denis.

11 April 2015
21:00 CEST

Bastia	0–4	Paris Saint-Germain
	Report	Ibrahimović 21' (pen.), 41'; Cavani 80', 90+2'

Stade de France, Saint-Denis
Attendance: 72,000
Referee: Benoît Bastien

== Media coverage ==
For the seventh consecutive season, the tournament was screened in France by France Télévisions.

Round	France Télévisions live match
First round	
Second round	
Third Round	
Round of 16	
Quarter-finals	
Semi-finals	
Final	

== See also ==
- 2014–15 Ligue 1
- 2014–15 Ligue 2
