= 2016 Toulon Tournament squads =

Players marked in bold have been capped at full International level.

== Group A ==
=== Bulgaria ===
Coach: (Bulgaria) Antoni Zdravkov

No.	Pos.	Player	Date of birth (age)	Club
1	GK	Georgi Kitanov	March 6, 1995 (aged 21)	(Bulgarian Football Union) Cherno More
2	DF	Georgi Radev	September 15, 1994 (aged 21)	(Bulgarian Football Union) Sozopol
3	DF	Galin Minkov	November 2, 1997 (aged 18)	(Bulgarian Football Union) Litex Lovech
4	DF	Radoslav Terziev	August 6, 1994 (aged 21)	(Bulgarian Football Union) Botev Plovdiv
5	DF	**Plamen Galabov**	November 2, 1995 (aged 20)	(Bulgarian Football Union) Litex Lovech
6	DF	Plamen Tenev	June 13, 1995 (aged 20)	(Bulgarian Football Union) Beroe
7	FW	**Kiril Despodov**	November 11, 1996 (aged 19)	(Bulgarian Football Union) Litex Lovech
8	MF	Milen Gamakov	April 12, 1994 (aged 22)	(Bulgarian Football Union) Botev Plovdiv
9	FW	**Georgi Minchev**	April 20, 1995 (aged 21)	(Bulgarian Football Union) Litex Lovech
10	FW	**Antonio Vutov**	June 6, 1996 (aged 19)	(Italian Football Federation) Cosenza Calcio
11	FW	Yulian Nenov	November 17, 1994 (aged 21)	(Bulgarian Football Union) Dunav Ruse
12	GK	Mihail Mihaylov	June 16, 1997 (aged 18)	(Bulgarian Football Union) Beroe
14	FW	Aleksandar Georgiev	October 10, 1997 (aged 18)	(Bulgarian Football Union) Litex Lovech
15	MF	**Kristiyan Malinov**	March 30, 1994 (aged 22)	(Bulgarian Football Union) Litex Lovech
16	MF	Manol Chapov	January 25, 1996 (aged 20)	(Bulgarian Football Union) Lokomotiv 2012 Mezdra
17	MF	**Dimitar Velkovski**	January 22, 1995 (aged 21)	(Bulgarian Football Union) Lokomotiv Plovdiv
18	MF	**Borislav Tsonev**	April 29, 1995 (aged 21)	(Bulgarian Football Union) Levski Sofia
19	MF	Bekir Rasim	December 26, 1994 (aged 21)	(Bulgarian Football Union) Cherno More
20	MF	**Bozhidar Kraev**	June 23, 1997 (aged 18)	(Bulgarian Football Union) Levski Sofia
21	DF	Lazar Marin	February 9, 1994 (aged 22)	(Bulgarian Football Union) Botev Plovdiv

=== France ===
Coach: (France) Patrick Gonfalone

No.	Pos.	Player	Date of birth (age)	Club
1	GK	Florian Escales	February 3, 1996 (aged 20)	(French Football Federation) Marseille
3	DF	**Moussa Niakhaté**	March 8, 1996 (aged 20)	(French Football Federation) Valenciennes
4	DF	**Mouctar Diakhaby**	December 19, 1996 (aged 19)	(French Football Federation) Lyon
5	DF	**Dylan Batubinsika**	February 15, 1996 (aged 20)	(French Football Federation) Paris Saint-Germain
6	MF	**Olivier Kemen**	July 20, 1996 (aged 19)	(French Football Federation) Lyon
7	FW	Roli Pereira de Sa	December 10, 1996 (aged 19)	(French Football Federation) Paris
8	MF	Samed Kılıç	January 28, 1996 (aged 20)	(French Football Federation) Auxerre
9	FW	**Serhou Guirassy**	March 12, 1996 (aged 20)	(French Football Federation) Auxerre
10	FW	Lys Mousset	February 8, 1996 (aged 20)	(French Football Federation) Le Havre
11	MF	Maxime D'Arpino	July 12, 1996 (aged 19)	(French Football Federation) Lyon
12	DF	Séga Coulibaly	June 9, 1996 (aged 19)	(French Football Federation) Rennes
13	DF	**Angelo Fulgini**	August 20, 1996 (aged 19)	(French Football Federation) Valenciennes
14	MF	Brahim Konaté	March 20, 1996 (aged 20)	(French Football Federation) Auxerre
15	FW	**Jonathan Bamba**	March 26, 1996 (aged 20)	(French Football Federation) Paris
16	GK	**Bingourou Kamara**	October 21, 1996 (aged 19)	(French Football Federation) Tours
17	MF	Sébastien Salles-Lamonge	January 28, 1996 (aged 20)	(French Football Federation) Rennes
18	FW	Thomas Robinet	September 18, 1996 (aged 19)	(French Football Federation) Sochaux
19	DF	**Abdou Diallo**	May 4, 1996 (aged 20)	(Royal Belgian Football Association) Zulte Waregem

=== Czech Republic ===
Coach: (Czech Republic) Pavel Hoftych

No.	Pos.	Player	Date of birth (age)	Club
1	GK	Luděk Vejmola	November 3, 1994 (aged 21)	(Football Association of the Czech Republic) FC Vysočina Jihlava
2	DF	Petr Chýla	May 5, 1994 (aged 22)	(Football Association of the Czech Republic) 1. FC Slovácko
3	DF	Denis Granečný	September 7, 1998 (aged 17)	(Football Association of the Czech Republic) FC Baník Ostrava
4	MF	Daniel Tetour	July 17, 1994 (aged 21)	(Football Association of the Czech Republic) FK Dukla Praha
5	DF	**Filip Kaša**	January 1, 1994 (aged 22)	(Football Association of the Czech Republic) FC Baník Ostrava
6	MF	**Jan Sýkora**	December 9, 1993 (aged 22)	(Football Association of the Czech Republic) FC Slovan Liberec
7	FW	Lukáš Buchvaldek	January 30, 1996 (aged 20)	(Football Association of the Czech Republic) SK Dynamo České Budějovice
8	MF	Ondřej Machuča	April 13, 1996 (aged 20)	(Football Association of the Czech Republic) FC Slovan Liberec
9	MF	Jakub Fulnek	April 26, 1994 (aged 22)	(Football Association of the Czech Republic) FC Vysočina Jihlava
10	MF	Petr Kodeš	January 31, 1996 (aged 20)	(Football Association of the Czech Republic) FK Teplice
11	MF	Dominik Preisler	September 20, 1995 (aged 20)	(Football Association of the Czech Republic) FK Dukla Praha
12	DF	Jan Štěrba	July 8, 1994 (aged 21)	(Football Association of the Czech Republic) SK Sigma Olomouc
13	DF	Lukáš Hůlka	March 31, 1995 (aged 21)	(Football Association of the Czech Republic) FK Mladá Boleslav
14	DF	Oldřich Byrtus	January 4, 1994 (aged 22)	(Football Association of the Czech Republic) MFK Frýdek-Místek
15	FW	**Tomáš Chorý**	January 26, 1995 (aged 21)	(Football Association of the Czech Republic) SK Sigma Olomouc
16	GK	Vojtěch Vorel	June 18, 1996 (aged 19)	(Football Association of the Czech Republic) FC Sellior Bellot Vlašim
17	DF	**Patrizio Stronati**	November 17, 1994 (aged 21)	(Austrian Football Association) Austria Wien
18	FW	Matěj Pulkrab	May 23, 1997 (aged 18)	(Football Association of the Czech Republic) FC Slovan Liberec
19	MF	Milan Lutonský	August 10, 1993 (aged 22)	(Football Association of the Czech Republic) FC Zbrojovka Brno
20	MF	**Šimon Falta**	April 23, 1993 (aged 23)	(Football Association of the Czech Republic) SK Sigma Olomouc

=== Mexico ===
Coach: (Mexico) Raúl Gutiérrez

No.	Pos.	Player	Date of birth (age)	Club
1	GK	**Gibran Lajud**	December 25, 1993 (aged 22)	(Mexican Football Federation) Tijuana
2	DF	Carlos Guzmán	May 19, 1994 (aged 21)	(Mexican Football Federation) Tijuana
3	DF	Luis López	August 25, 1993 (aged 22)	(Mexican Football Federation) Monterrey
4	DF	**Jordan Silva**	July 30, 1994 (aged 21)	(Mexican Football Federation) Toluca
5	DF	Kevin Gutiérrez	March 1, 1995 (aged 21)	(Mexican Football Federation) Tijuana
6	MF	Ulises Rivas	January 26, 1996 (aged 20)	(Mexican Football Federation) Santos Laguna Premier
7	MF	**Alfonso González**	September 5, 1994 (aged 21)	(Mexican Football Federation) Atlas
8	MF	Daniel Álvarez	July 22, 1994 (aged 21)	(Mexican Football Federation) Atlas
9	FW	Luis Loroña	June 21, 1993 (aged 22)	(Mexican Football Federation) Chiapas
10	MF	**Omar Govea**	January 18, 1996 (aged 20)	(Portuguese Football Federation) FC Porto B
11	FW	Alejandro Díaz	January 27, 1996 (aged 20)	(Mexican Football Federation) América
12	GK	**Raúl Gudiño**	April 22, 1996 (aged 20)	(Portuguese Football Federation) União da Madeira
13	DF	Juan García Sancho	November 10, 1994 (aged 21)	(Mexican Football Federation) Cruz Azul
14	DF	Jesús García	August 7, 1994 (aged 21)	(Mexican Football Federation) Sinaloa Premier
15	DF	**Osvaldo Rodríguez**	September 10, 1996 (aged 19)	(Mexican Football Federation) Pachuca
16	MF	Javier Salas	August 20, 1993 (aged 22)	(Mexican Football Federation) Sinaloa
17	MF	Rosario Cota	September 12, 1995 (aged 20)	(Mexican Football Federation) Cruz Azul Premier
18	MF	Carlos Fierro	July 24, 1994 (aged 21)	(Mexican Football Federation) Querétaro
19	FW	**Erick Torres**	January 19, 1993 (aged 23)	(United States Soccer Federation) Houston Dynamo
20	FW	Ulises Jaimes	April 20, 1996 (aged 20)	(Mexican Football Federation) Monarcas Morelia

=== Mali ===
Coach: (Mali) Fousseni Diawara

No.	Pos.	Player	Date of birth (age)	Club
1	GK	Ousmane Dibatère	January 8, 1997 (aged 19)	(French Football Federation) SC Amiens
2	DF	Baba Traoré	February 21, 1996 (aged 20)	(French Football Federation) Bordeaux
3	DF	Madigoundo Diakité	April 17, 1994 (aged 22)	(French Football Federation) Stade Briochin
4	DF	**Alassane Diaby**	October 6, 1995 (aged 20)	(Royal Belgian Football Association) Lierse
5	DF	Samba Touré	January 8, 1993 (aged 23)	(French Football Federation) Saint-Malo
6	MF	Modibo Dembélé	August 14, 1993 (aged 22)	(French Football Federation) Laval
7	FW	Issa Baradji	June 15, 1995 (aged 20)	(French Football Federation) Red Star
8	MF	**Diadie Samassékou**	January 11, 1996 (aged 20)	(Austrian Football Association) Red Bull Salzburg
9	FW	**Adama Niane**	June 16, 1993 (aged 22)	(French Football Federation) Nantes
10	MF	**Ibrahima Tandia**	July 12, 1993 (aged 22)	(French Football Federation) Tours
11	MF	**Fousseni Diabaté**	October 18, 1995 (aged 20)	(French Football Federation) Guingamp
12	MF	Nianankoro Doumbia	May 23, 1996 (aged 19)	(Royal Belgian Football Association) Seraing United
13	MF	**Souleymane Diarra**	June 30, 1995 (aged 20)	(Hungarian Football Federation) Ujpest
14	FW	Mamadou Sambagué	January 11, 1996 (aged 20)	(French Football Federation) Caen
15	MF	Phousseyne Diaby	January 6, 1995 (aged 21)	(Royal Belgian Football Association) Zaventem
17	DF	**Falaye Sacko**	May 1, 1995 (aged 21)	(Portuguese Football Federation) Vitória
18	FW	Mohamed Guilavogui	November 14, 1996 (aged 19)	(French Football Federation) Montpellier
20	FW	**Lassana Coulibaly**	April 10, 1996 (aged 20)	(French Football Federation) Bastia

== Group B ==
=== England ===
Coach: (England) Gareth Southgate

Brendan Galloway was ruled out of the England squad after he was injured in training; he was replaced by Rob Holding.

No.	Pos.	Player	Date of birth (age)	Club
1	GK	**Jordan Pickford**	March 7, 1994 (aged 22)	(The Football Association) Sunderland
2	DF	Dominic Iorfa	June 24, 1995 (aged 20)	(The Football Association) Wolverhampton Wanderers
3	DF	Matt Targett	September 18, 1995 (aged 20)	(The Football Association) Southampton
4	MF	**Nathaniel Chalobah**	December 12, 1994 (aged 21)	(The Football Association) Chelsea
5	DF	**Calum Chambers**	January 20, 1995 (aged 21)	(The Football Association) Arsenal
6	DF	Kortney Hause	July 16, 1995 (aged 20)	(The Football Association) Wolverhampton Wanderers
7	FW	Duncan Watmore	March 8, 1994 (aged 22)	(The Football Association) Sunderland
8	MF	**James Ward-Prowse**	November 1, 1994 (aged 21)	(The Football Association) Southampton
9	FW	Cauley Woodrow	December 2, 1994 (aged 21)	(The Football Association) Fulham
10	MF	**Ruben Loftus-Cheek**	January 23, 1996 (aged 20)	(The Football Association) Chelsea
11	MF	**Nathan Redmond**	March 6, 1994 (aged 22)	(The Football Association) Norwich City
12	MF	Lewis Baker	April 25, 1995 (aged 21)	(The Football Association) Chelsea
13	GK	**Angus Gunn**	January 22, 1996 (aged 20)	(The Football Association) Manchester City
14	MF	**Jack Grealish**	September 10, 1995 (aged 20)	(The Football Association) Aston Villa
15	DF	Jack Stephens	January 27, 1994 (aged 22)	(The Football Association) Southampton
16	MF	Matt Grimes	July 15, 1995 (aged 20)	(Football Association of Wales) Swansea City
17	MF	John Swift	June 23, 1995 (aged 20)	(The Football Association) Chelsea
18	DF	Rob Holding	September 20, 1995 (aged 20)	(The Football Association) Bolton Wanderers
19	MF	**Kasey Palmer**	November 9, 1996 (aged 19)	(The Football Association) Chelsea
20	DF	**Ben Chilwell**	December 21, 1996 (aged 19)	(The Football Association) Leicester City

=== Guinea ===
Head coach: (Guinea) Koly Koivogui

No.	Pos.	Player	Date of birth (age)	Club
1	GK	Kandjoura Diaby		(French Football Federation) CS Sablon Gazonfier
2	DF	Abou Magnora	May 12, 1996 (aged 20)	(French Football Federation) Rennes
3	DF	Naby Sampou	July 11, 1994 (aged 21)	(French Football Federation) Fontenay
4	DF	Jean François Kamano		(French Football Federation) Le Mans
5	DF	Mohamed Touré		(French Football Federation) Châteauroux
6	MF	Alpha Kaba	October 13, 1997 (aged 18)	(French Football Federation) Caen
7	FW	Tafsir Chérif	June 19, 1995 (aged 20)	(French Football Federation) Monaco
8	MF	Salimou Touré	September 18, 1994 (aged 21)	(French Football Federation) Marseille
9	FW	Mamadou Guirassy		(United States Soccer Federation) NJIT Highlanders
10	MF	**Pépé Guilavogui**	January 2, 1993 (aged 23)	(Slovak Football Association) Spartak Trnava
11	MF	Fodé Guirassy	January 6, 1996 (aged 20)	(French Football Federation) Auxerre
12	MF	Seiti Touré	October 22, 1995 (aged 20)	(French Football Federation) Toulouse
13	DF	**Abdoulaye Cissé**	November 30, 1994 (aged 21)	(French Football Federation) Angers
14	DF	Babacar Camara	November 21, 1994 (aged 21)	(Guinean Football Federation) Kaloum Star
15	DF	Souleymane Makadji	October 27, 1996 (aged 19)	(Royal Belgian Football Association) Londerzeel
16	GK	Ousmane Doukouré		(French Football Federation) Mureaux
17	MF	Amadou Diallo	June 21, 1994 (aged 21)	(Royal Belgian Football Association) Royal White Star Bruxelles
18	FW	Bangaly Soumah	November 23, 1995 (aged 20)	(French Football Federation) St-Pryvé St-Hilaire
19	FW	Joey Milimono	May 27, 1995 (aged 20)	(Royal Belgian Football Association) Coxyde
20	FW	Thierno Diallo	March 7, 1996 (aged 20)	(French Football Federation) Tours

=== Japan ===
Head coach: (Japan) Makoto Teguramori

No.	Pos.	Player	Date of birth (age)	Club
1	GK	Masatoshi Kushibiki	January 29, 1993 (aged 23)	(Japan Football Association) Kashima Antlers
2	DF	Sai van Wermeskerken	June 28, 1994 (aged 21)	(Royal Dutch Football Association) Dordrecht
3	DF	**Genta Miura**	March 1, 1995 (aged 21)	(Japan Football Association) Shimizu S-Pulse
4	DF	Takuya Iwanami	June 18, 1994 (aged 21)	(Japan Football Association) Vissel Kobe
5	DF	**Naomichi Ueda**	October 24, 1994 (aged 21)	(Japan Football Association) Kashima Antlers
6	DF	Masashi Kamekawa	May 28, 1993 (aged 22)	(Japan Football Association) Avispa Fukuoka
7	MF	Riki Harakawa	August 18, 1993 (aged 22)	(Japan Football Association) Kawasaki Frontale
8	MF	**Ryota Oshima**	January 23, 1993 (aged 23)	(Japan Football Association) Kawasaki Frontale
9	FW	**Ado Onaiwu**	November 8, 1995 (aged 20)	(Japan Football Association) JEF United
10	MF	Shinya Yajima	January 18, 1994 (aged 22)	(Japan Football Association) Fagiano Okayama
11	MF	**Gakuto Notsuda**	June 6, 1994 (aged 21)	(Japan Football Association) Albirex Niigata
12	GK	**Kosuke Nakamura**	February 27, 1995 (aged 21)	(Japan Football Association) Kashiwa Reysol
13	DF	Hiromu Mitsumaru	July 6, 1993 (aged 22)	(Japan Football Association) Sagan Tosu
14	MF	Naoki Maeda	November 17, 1994 (aged 21)	(Japan Football Association) Yokohama Marinos
15	MF	Takuya Kida	September 23, 1994 (aged 21)	(Japan Football Association) Yokohama Marinos
16	FW	**Takuma Asano**	November 10, 1994 (aged 21)	(Japan Football Association) Sanfrecce Hiroshima
17	MF	**Yosuke Ideguchi**	August 23, 1996 (aged 19)	(Japan Football Association) Gamba Osaka
18	MF	**Takumi Minamino**	January 16, 1995 (aged 21)	(Austrian Football Association) Red Bull Salzburg
19	FW	**Daichi Kamada**	August 5, 1996 (aged 19)	(Japan Football Association) Sagan Tosu
20	FW	Cayman Togashi	August 10, 1993 (aged 22)	(Japan Football Association) Yokohama Marinos

=== Paraguay ===
Head coach: (Paraguay) Carlos Humberto Paredes

No.	Pos.	Player	Date of birth (age)	Club
1	GK	Alan Vento	May 9, 1995 (aged 21)	(Paraguayan Football Association) Olimpia
2	DF	Rodi Ferreira	May 29, 1998 (aged 17)	(Paraguayan Football Association) Olimpia
3	DF	Hugo Paniagua	April 4, 1997 (aged 19)	(Paraguayan Football Association) Cerro Porteño
4	DF	Diego Melgarejo	September 19, 1998 (aged 17)	(Paraguayan Football Association) Nacional
5	DF	Édgar Benítez	March 14, 1997 (aged 19)	(Paraguayan Football Association) Libertad
6	MF	Arturo Aranda	April 20, 1998 (aged 18)	(Paraguayan Football Association) Libertad
7	FW	Derlis Rodríguez	September 18, 1997 (aged 18)	(Paraguayan Football Association) Libertad
8	MF	Gustavo Viera	August 28, 1995 (aged 20)	(Paraguayan Football Association) Rubio Ñu
9	FW	Pedro Báez	January 15, 1997 (aged 19)	(Paraguayan Football Association) Cerro Porteño
11	MF	Walter Bogado	March 1, 1999 (aged 17)	(Paraguayan Football Association) Olimpia
12	GK	Ever Mereles	April 6, 1997 (aged 19)	(Paraguayan Football Association) Libertad
14	DF	**Omar Alderete**	December 26, 1996 (aged 19)	(Paraguayan Football Association) Cerro Porteño
15	MF	Richard Prieto	January 25, 1997 (aged 19)	(Paraguayan Football Association) General Díaz
16	DF	Joel Jiménez	May 22, 1997 (aged 18)	(Paraguayan Football Association) Cerro Porteño
17	MF	Richard Brítez	March 13, 1999 (aged 17)	(Paraguayan Football Association) Libertad
18	MF	**Josué Colmán**	July 25, 1998 (aged 17)	(Paraguayan Football Association) Cerro Porteño
19	MF	**Mathías Villasanti**	January 24, 1997 (aged 19)	(Paraguayan Football Association) Cerro Porteño
20	FW	**Sergio Díaz**	March 5, 1998 (aged 18)	(Paraguayan Football Association) Cerro Porteño
21	FW	Sergio Bareiro	November 4, 1998 (aged 17)	(Paraguayan Football Association) General Díaz

=== Portugal ===
Head coach: (Portugal) Edgar Álvaro Borges

No.	Pos.	Player	Date of birth (age)	Caps	Goals	Club
1	GK	Joel Castro Pereira	June 28, 1996 (aged 19)	1	0	(The Football Association) Manchester United
2	DF	**Hildeberto Pereira**	March 2, 1996 (aged 20)	2	0	(Portuguese Football Federation) Benfica
3	DF	**Rúben Dias**	May 14, 1997 (aged 19)	0	0	(Portuguese Football Federation) Benfica
4	DF	Diogo Verdasca	October 26, 1996 (aged 19)	2	0	(Portuguese Football Federation) Porto
5	DF	**Ivanildo Fernandes**	March 26, 1996 (aged 20)	2	0	(Portuguese Football Federation) Sporting CP
6	MF	Gilson Costa	September 24, 1996 (aged 19)	2	0	(Portuguese Football Federation) Benfica
7	FW	**Romário Baldé** (captain)	December 25, 1996 (aged 19)	2	1	(Portuguese Football Federation) Tondela
8	MF	Sérgio Ribeiro	January 18, 1996 (aged 20)	2	0	(Portuguese Football Federation) Porto
9	FW	**João Pedro**	November 13, 1996 (aged 19)	2	0	(Portuguese Football Federation) Gil Vicente
10	MF	André Horta	November 7, 1996 (aged 19)	2	0	(Portuguese Football Federation) Vitória Setúbal
11	FW	Rúben Macedo	March 9, 1996 (aged 20)	2	0	(Portuguese Football Federation) Porto
12	GK	João Costa	February 2, 1996 (aged 20)	1	0	(Portuguese Football Federation) Porto
13	DF	Rui Silva	June 5, 1996 (aged 19)	0	0	(Portuguese Football Federation) Santa Clara
14	MF	**Dálcio Gomes**	May 22, 1996 (aged 19)	2	1	(Portuguese Football Federation) Benfica
15	MF	Joca	January 30, 1996 (aged 20)	2	0	(Portuguese Football Federation) Braga
16	MF	João Gamboa	August 31, 1996 (aged 19)	2	0	(Portuguese Football Federation) Braga
17	FW	Xande Silva	March 16, 1997 (aged 19)	0	0	(Portuguese Football Federation) Vitória S.C.
18	MF	Pedro Rodrigues	May 20, 1997 (aged 18)	0	0	(Portuguese Football Federation) Benfica
19	DF	Bruno Wilson	December 27, 1996 (aged 19)	1	0	(Portuguese Football Federation) Braga
20	DF	Paulo Henrique	October 23, 1996 (aged 19)	0	0	(Portuguese Football Federation) Pacos de Ferreira
