= N'Gakoutou =

N'Gakoutou is a Central African surname. Notable people with the surname include:

- Quentin N'Gakoutou (born 1994), Central African Republic football forward
- Yannis N'Gakoutou (born 1998), Gabonese football right-back
- Wesley N'Gakoutou (born 2001), Central African Republic football winger
