= Yannis N'Gakoutou =

Association football player (born 1998)

Personal information
- Full name: Yannis Clarence N'Gakoutou Yapéndé
- Date of birth: 30 September 1998 (age 28)
- Place of birth: Saint-Denis, France
- Height: 1.76 m (5 ft 9 in)
- Position: Right-back

Team information
- Current team: Lyon La Duchère
- Number: 2

Youth career
- 2011–2015: Drancy
- 2015–2016: Monaco

Senior career*
Years	Team	Apps	(Gls)
2016–2020	Monaco B	51	(1)
2020–2021	GOAL FC	0	(0)
2021–	Lyon La Duchère II	10	(1)
2021–2022	Lyon La Duchère	21	(1)
2022–2023	FC 93	19	(0)
2023–	Balagne	18	(2)

International career^{‡}
2022–	Gabon	4	(0)
- * Club domestic league appearances and goals as of 03:24, 10 April 2025 (UTC) ‡ National team caps and goals as of 03:24, 10 April 2025 (UTC)

Yannis Clarence N'Gakoutou Yapéndé (born 30 September 1998) is a professional footballer who plays as a winger for Championnat National 1 club Balagne. Born in France, he plays for the Gabon national team.

== Club career ==
N'Gakoutou is a youth product of Drancy and Monaco before beginning his senior career with the reserves of Monaco in 2016. He moved to GOAL FC in 2020, but was hampered by injuries. He then transferred to Lyon La Duchère on 25 June 2021.

== International career ==
N'Gakoutou was born in France to a Central African Republic father and Gabonese mother. He made his international debut with the Gabon national team in a 1–1 friendly tie with Mauritania on 4 January 2022. He was part of the Gabon squad for the 2021 Africa Cup of Nations.

== Personal life ==
Yannis is the brother of the Central African Republic international footballers Quentin and Wesley N'Gakoutou.
