= Babiloni =

Babiloni is a surname of Spanish origin. Notable people with the surname include:

- Pascual Babiloni (1946–2023), Spanish footballer
- Paul Babiloni (born 1990), French footballer
