= Benjamin Gomel =

French footballer (born 1998)

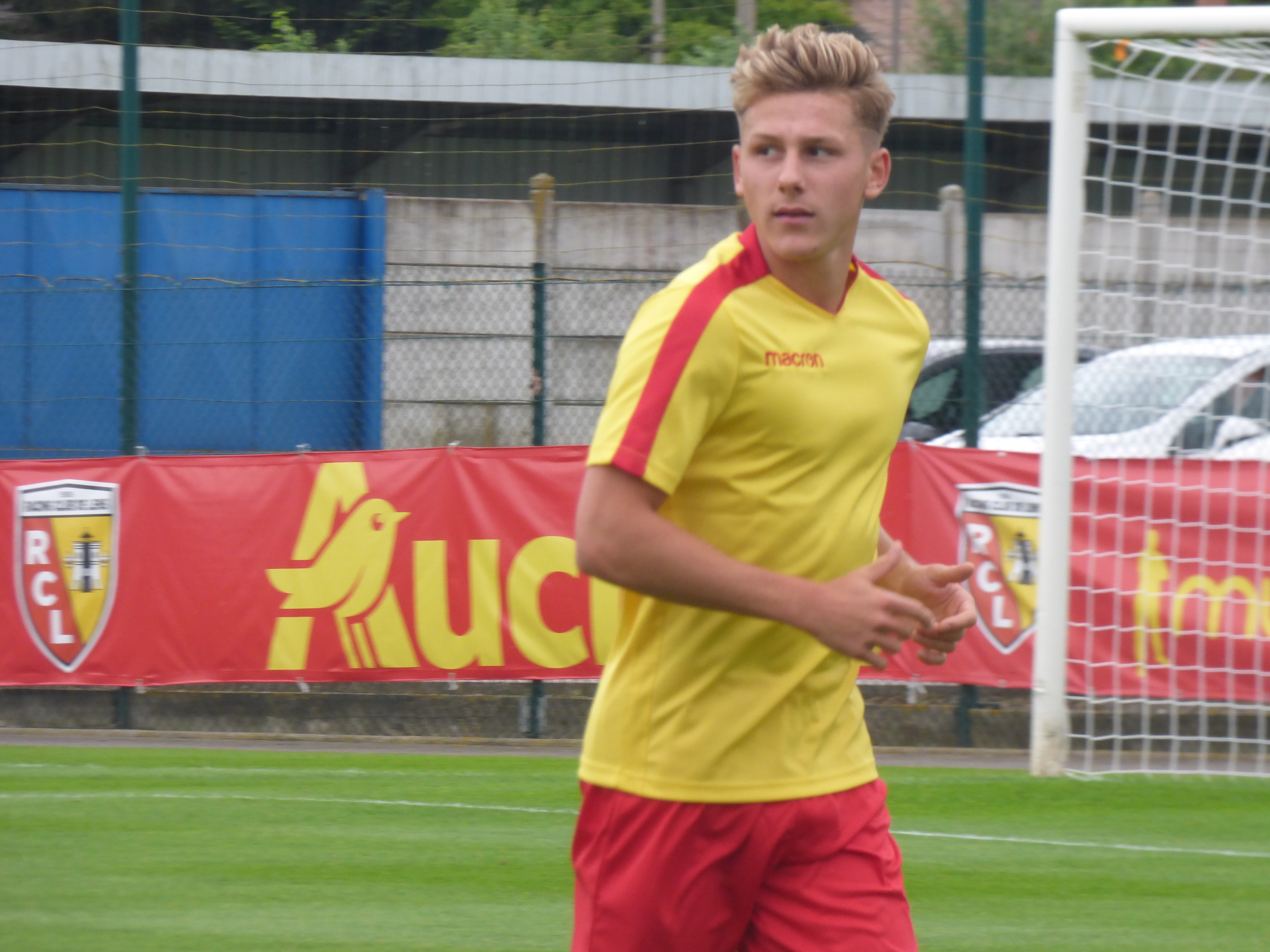
- Gomel with Lens in 2018

Personal information
- Date of birth: 14 May 1998 (age 28)
- Place of birth: Boulogne-Sur-Mer, France
- Height: 1.77 m (5 ft 10 in)
- Position: Forward

Team information
- Current team: Sochaux
- Number: 7

Youth career
- Lens

Senior career*
Years	Team	Apps	(Gls)
2016–2020	Lens B	47	(10)
2017–2020	Lens	1	(0)
2018–2019	→ Boulogne (loan)	11	(0)
2018–2019	→ Drancy (loan)	4	(0)
2019–2020	→ Cholet (loan)	18	(3)
2020–2021	Red Star	28	(5)
2021–2022	Boulogne	23	(4)
2022–2023	Sedan	26	(4)
2023–2025	Nancy	42	(7)
2025–	Sochaux	31	(12)
- * Club domestic league appearances and goals as of 23 June 2026

Benjamin Gomel (French pronunciation: [bɛ̃ʒamɛ̃ gɔmɛl]; born 14 May 1998) is a French professional footballer who plays as a forward for Ligue 2 club Sochaux.

== Career ==
Gomel made his professional debut for Lens in a 1–1 Ligue 2 tie against Lorient on 3 February 2018. After three loans, he signed for Red Star, in the Championnat National.

In October 2021, Gomel returned to Boulogne. In June 2022, he signed for Sedan. After Sedan filed for bankruptcy during summer 2023, he transfers to Nancy.

== Honours ==
Nancy

- Championnat National: 2024–25
