= Claude Gonçalves =

Portuguese footballer (born 1994)

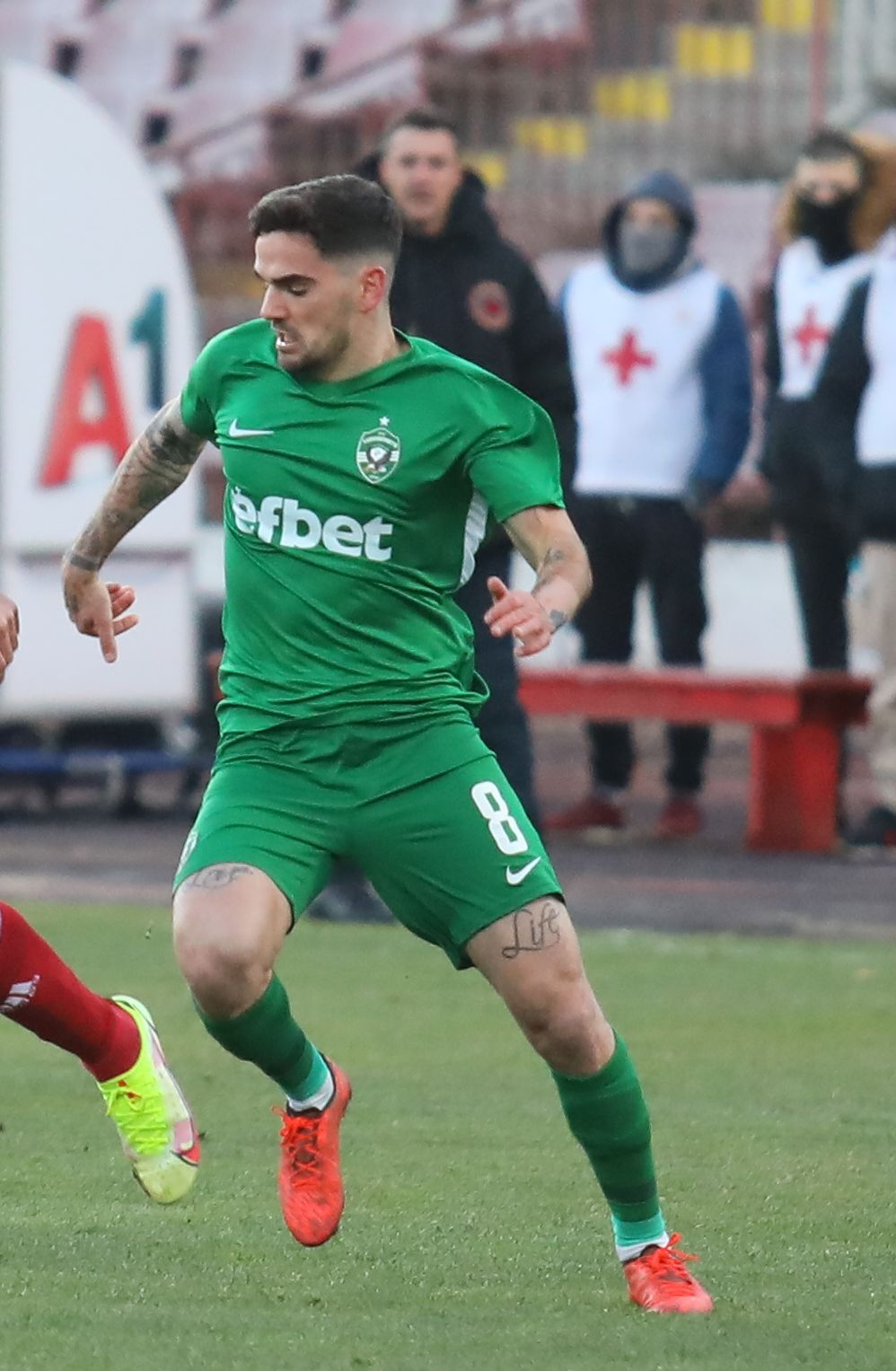
- Gonçalves with Ludogorets Razgrad in 2021

Personal information
- Full name: Joaquim Claude Gonçalves Araújo
- Date of birth: 9 April 1994 (age 32)
- Place of birth: Propriano, France
- Height: 1.73 m (5 ft 8 in)
- Position: Defensive midfielder

Team information
- Current team: Maribor
- Number: 8

Youth career
- 2007–2012: Ajaccio

Senior career*
Years	Team	Apps	(Gls)
2012–2016	Ajaccio B	28	(1)
2013–2016	Ajaccio	75	(0)
2016–2018	Tondela	53	(0)
2018–2019	Troyes	15	(0)
2019–2021	Gil Vicente	57	(3)
2021−2024	Ludogorets Razgrad	74	(2)
2022	Ludogorets Razgrad II	3	(0)
2024−2026	Legia Warsaw	27	(1)
2026−	Maribor	8	(0)

International career
2014	Portugal U20	5	(0)
- * Club domestic league appearances and goals as of 23:36, 5 October 2026 (UTC)

Joaquim Claude Gonçalves Araújo (born 9 April 1994), known as Gonçalves, is a professional footballer who plays as a defensive midfielder for Slovenian PrvaLiga club Maribor.

Born in France, he represented Portugal at youth international level.

== Club career ==
=== Ajaccio ===
Born in Propriano, Corsica of Portuguese descent, Gonçalves came through local AC Ajaccio's youth system. He made his Ligue 1 debut on 21 September 2013, coming on as a 46th-minute substitute for Jean-Baptiste Pierazzi in a 2–0 away loss against Stade Rennais FC.

Gonçalves contributed 23 games – 14 starts – in his first season, but the club returned to Ligue 2 after finishing in 20th and last position.

=== Tondela ===
On 20 June 2016, Gonçalves signed a two-year contract with C.D. Tondela of the Portuguese Primeira Liga. He first appeared in the competition on 13 August, playing 34 minutes in a 0–2 home defeat to S.L. Benfica.

Gonçalves appeared in 58 competitive matches during his spell at the Estádio João Cardoso.

=== Troyes ===
On 30 August 2018, Gonçalves joined French second-tier side Troyes AC on a two-year deal. His maiden league appearance took place on 26 October, when he replaced Yoann Salmier midway through the second half of the 2–0 away victory over Grenoble Foot 38.

=== Gil Vicente ===
Gonçalves returned to the Portuguese top flight in summer 2019, agreeing to a contract at Gil Vicente FC. He scored his first goal for the club on 19 October, closing the 2–0 defeat of F.C. Penafiel in the third round of the Taça de Portugal. His first in the league came two months later, at home with Vitória de Guimarães (2–2).

=== Ludogorets ===
In May 2021, Gonçalves joined PFC Ludogorets Razgrad of the First Professional Football League, with the deal being made effective on 1 July. He won the Bulgarian Supercup on 17 July after beating PFC CSKA Sofia 4–0, and at the end of his debut campaign was also crowned national champion.

Gonçalves won a further two domestic leagues until the end of his tenure, totalling 121 appearances and nine assists.

=== Legia Warsaw ===
On 15 June 2024, Gonçalves signed a three-year contract with Polish Ekstraklasa club Legia Warsaw. He scored his first goal on 25 July, closing a 6–0 home win over Caernarfon Town in the second qualifying round of the UEFA Conference League in injury time.

Gonçalves featured 60 minutes of the 4–3 victory against Pogoń Szczecin in the final of the Polish Cup.

=== Maribor ===
On 6 July 2026, Gonçalves moved to NK Maribor on a two-year deal.

== International career ==
Gonçalves won the second of his five caps for the Portugal under-20 team during the 2014 Toulon Tournament, featuring the full 90 minutes in the 2–0 group stage win over Mexico.

== Career statistics ==
As of match played 18 December 2025

Appearances and goals by club, season and competition
Club	Season	League			National cup (Note: Includes Coupe de France, Taça de Portugal, Bulgarian Cup, Polish Cup)		League cup (Note: Includes Coupe de la Ligue, Taça da Liga)		Europe		Other		Total	
Club	Season	Division	Apps	Goals	Apps	Goals	Apps	Goals	Apps	Goals	Apps	Goals	Apps	Goals
Ajaccio B	2012–13	Championnat National 3	21	0	—		—		—		—		21	0
Ajaccio B	2013–14	Championnat National 3	2	0	—		—		—		—		2	0
Ajaccio B	2015–16	Championnat National 3	5	1	—		—		—		—		5	1
Ajaccio B	Total		28	1	—		—		—		—		28	1
Ajaccio	2013–14	Ligue 1	23	0	1	0	0	0	—		—		24	0
Ajaccio	2014–15	Ligue 2	27	0	2	0	3	0	—		—		32	0
Ajaccio	2015–16	Ligue 2	25	0	2	0	2	0	—		—		29	0
Ajaccio	Total		75	0	5	0	5	0	—		—		85	0
Tondela	2016–17	Primeira Liga	28	0	1	0	1	0	—		—		30	0
Tondela	2017–18	Primeira Liga	25	0	0	0	1	0	—		—		26	0
Tondela	Total		53	0	1	0	2	0	—		—		56	0
Troyes	2018–19	Ligue 2	15	0	0	0	1	0	—		—		16	0
Gil Vicente	2019–20	Primeira Liga	24	1	1	0	2	0	—		—		27	1
Gil Vicente	2020–21	Primeira Liga	33	2	4	1	0	0	—		—		37	3
Gil Vicente	Total		57	3	5	1	2	0	—		—		64	4
Ludogorets Razgrad	2021–22	First Professional League	27	0	2	0	—		14 (Note: Eight appearances in UEFA Champions League, six appearances in UEFA Europa League)	0	1 (Note: Appearance in Bulgarian Super Cup)	0	44	0
Ludogorets Razgrad	2022–23	First Professional League	19	1	5	0	—		4 (Note: One appearance in UEFA Champions League, one appearance in UEFA Europa League, two appearances in UEFA Europa Conference League)	0	0	0	28	1
Ludogorets Razgrad	2023–24	First Professional League	28	1	5	0	—		16 (Note: Four appearances in UEFA Champions League, four appearances in UEFA Europa League, eight appearances in UEFA Europa Conference League)	0	0	0	49	1
Ludogorets Razgrad	Total		74	2	12	0	—		34	0	1	0	121	2
Ludogorets Razgrad II	2022–23	Second Professional League	3	0	—		—		—		—		3	0
Legia Warsaw	2024–25	Ekstraklasa	20	1	1	0	—		11 (Note: Appearances in UEFA Conference League)	1	—		32	2
Legia Warsaw	2025–26	Ekstraklasa	7	0	1	0	—		5 (Note: Three appearances in UEFA Europa League, two appearances in UEFA Conference League)	0	0	0	13	0
Legia Warsaw	Total		27	1	2	0	—		16	1	0	0	45	2
Career total			332	7	25	1	10	0	50	1	1	0	418	9

== Honours ==
Ludogorets Razgrad

- First Professional Football League: 2021–22, 2022–23, 2023–24
- Bulgarian Cup: 2022–23
- Bulgarian Supercup: 2021

Legia Warsaw

- Polish Cup: 2024–25
