= Abdallah Imamo =

Comorian international footballer (born 1993)

Personal information
- Full name: Abdallah Imamo Ahmed
- Date of birth: 19 April 1993 (age 33)
- Height: 1.80 m (5 ft 11 in)
- Positions: Left-back; midfielder

Senior career*
Years	Team	Apps	(Gls)
2013–2014	Savigny-le-Temple		
2014–2015	Longvic		
2015–2016	Quétigny	42	(11)
2016–2017	Selongey	24	(0)
2017–2019	Drancy	49	(3)
2019	Cherno More	0	(0)
2020	Sant Julià	6	(0)
2021–2022	Gueugnon	9	(0)
2022–2023	Jura Dolois	21	(1)
2023–2025	Pontarlier	14	(0)

International career^{‡}
2016–	Comoros	4	(0)
- * Club domestic league appearances and goals as of 20:13, 2 November 2025 (UTC) ‡ National team caps and goals as of 8 June 2019

Abdallah Imamo Ahmed (born 19 April 1993) is a footballer who plays as a left-back. Born in France, he represents Comoros internationally.

== Career ==
Imamo has formerly played in France for Savigny-le-Temple, Longvic, Quétigny, Selongey and Drancy.

On 11 November 2016, Imamo made his senior international debut for Comoros in a 2–2 home friendly draw against Togo, as a 88th-minute substitute for Youssouf M'Changama.
