= Mickaël Leca =

French footballer (born 1994)

Mickael Leca
Personal information
- Full name: Mickaël Leca
- Date of birth: 4 July 1994 (age 32)
- Place of birth: Ajaccio, France
- Height: 1.85 m (6 ft 1 in)
- Position: Left-back

Team information
- Current team: SC Bocognano

Youth career
- –2014: AC Ajaccio

Senior career*
Years	Team	Apps	(Gls)
2012–2015	AC Ajaccio B	46	(1)
2014–2015	AC Ajaccio	17	(0)
2015–	SC Bocognano		
- * Club domestic league appearances and goals as of 14:26, 13 April 2021 (UTC)

Mickaël Leca (born 4 July 1994) is a French professional footballer who plays as a left-back for Régional 1 club SC Bocognano.

== Career ==
On 22 March 2014, Leca made his professional debut in a 3–2 Ligue 1 away win over Valenciennes, playing the full ninety minutes.
