= GOAL FC =

French football club, based in Chasselay

- Full name: Grand Ouest Association Lyonnaise Football Club
- Founded: 1962; 64 years ago (as ACSMO); 2000; 26 years ago (as Monts d'Or); 2020; 6 years ago (as GOAL FC)
- Ground: Stade Ludovic Giuly, Chasselay
- Capacity: 5,000
- Chairman: Jocelyn Fontanel; Olivier Delorme
- Manager: Fabien Pujo
- League: National 1
- 2025–26: National 2 Group C, 9th of 16
- Website: https://goalfc.fr
Home colours	Away colours	Third colours

Grand Ouest Association Lyonnaise Football Club (short: GOAL FC, or Goal FC) is a French association football club founded in 2000. As of the 2026–2027 season, they compete in the Championnat National 1, having been relegated in the 2024–25 season.

== History ==
=== Predecessor club ===
The club was original founded as ASCMO (Association Sportive et Culturelle des Monts d'Or), on 30 May 1962. It was created by local families, teachers, and municipal leaders from the neighboring villages of Lissieu and Chasselay who wanted to team up and create recreational activities for local youth. Initially, the club had no dedicated sports fields, money, or even jerseys. Gradually, the club progressed and focused on the youth set-up bringing up players like Ludovic Giuly in the 1980s. At the same time his father, Dominique, was an active footballer for the club.

=== Modern era ===
In 2000 the club was established as Beaujolais Monts d'Or, the club became Monts d'Or Azergues in 2005 and Monts d'Or Anse Foot in 2017. The club took its current name in 2020 when it merged with smaller amateur clubs Tassin FC, Champagne Sport FC and Futsal Saône Monts d'Or. The new club had over 1,800 registered players across all age groups and activities, making it France's largest. They are based in the towns of Chasselay, Anse, Tassin-la-Demi-Lune, and Champagne-au-Mont-d'Or in the Auvergne-Rhône-Alpes region, and their main home stadium is the Stade Ludovic Giuly in Chasselay, named after France international Ludovic Giuly.

On the pitch, the club won the fifth-tier Championnat de France Amateur 2 in 2009–10. In January 2013, they announced the signing of Lyon-born former France international and FC Barcelona player Ludovic Giuly from June. He scored in a draw with FC Istres of Ligue 2 in the last 32 of the Coupe de France on 4 January 2014, which his team won on penalties. Eighteen days later in the last 16, held at Olympique Lyonnais's Stade de Gerland, the team lost 3–0 at home to Giuly's former club AS Monaco FC, for whom Radamel Falcao scored twice. Also in January 2014, former France international and OL mainstay Sidney Govou joined the club.

In May 2019, former Brazil international and OL player Cris was hired as manager, leaving two years later for Championnat National club Le Mans FC. Another of his former teammates, France international Anthony Réveillère, was director of football from 2020 to 2022. The club won promotion to the third-tier Championnat National for the first time as group winners in 2022–23, after defeating Stade Bordelais 3–1 on 3 June 2023.

== Honours ==
- Championnat National 3
  - Winner: 2009–10
- Championnat National 2
  - Winner: 2022–23

== Name history ==
- 1962: ASCMO (Founded as a regional youth association for Chasselay and Lissieu).
- 2000 : Beaujolais Monts d'Or (Rebranded to expand regional footprint).
- 2005 : Monts d'Or Azergues Foot (MDA Foot) (Changed after absorbing the Azergues valley area).
- 2017 : Monts d'Or Anse Foot (Updated to reflect a partnership with the town of Anse).
- 2020: GOAL FC (Grand Ouest Association Lyonnaise). Formed via a massive four-club merger.

== Current squad ==
As of 11 June 2026

Note: Flags indicate national team as defined under FIFA eligibility rules; some limited exceptions apply. Players may hold more than one non-FIFA nationality.

No.	Pos.	Nation	Player
6	MF	FRA	Loïc Dufau
7	MF	FRA	Enzo Reale
11	MF	FRA	Saïd Arab
12	FW	CAF	Wesley N'Gakoutou
15	DF	FRA	Zephir Bever
16	GK	FRA	Abdoul Coulibaly
18	DF	FRA	Mathis Louiserre
19	MF	FRA	Omar Benyounes
20	MF	FRA	Chafik Abbas
23	DF	FRA	Nathan Tanard
24	MF	FRA	Léo Fichten

No.	Pos.	Nation	Player
—	FW	FRA	Kenny Herbin
—	MF	FRA	Kamel Bennekrouf
—	FW	BEL	Marvin Bio
—	GK	FRA	Lucas Marsella
—	MF	FRA	Baptiste Macon
—	FW	HAI	Mc Jeffrey Pierre
—	MF	COD	Carmel Mabanza
—	MF	FRA	Yassine Zerfaoui
—	MF	CMR	Hamed Foundikou
—	DF	FRA	Aban Gibert
—	FW	MAR	Ade Balogun

== Notable players ==
- (France) Dominique Giuly
- (France) Ludovic Giuly
