= Manol Chapov =

Bulgarian footballer

Personal information
- Full name: Manol Ivanov Chapov
- Date of birth: 25 January 1996 (age 30)
- Place of birth: Blagoevgrad, Bulgaria
- Position: Midfielder

Team information
- Current team: [

Youth career
- 2004–2011: Pirin Blagoevgrad
- 2012–2013: 1. FC Nürnberg
- 2013–2014: VfR Aalen
- 2014–2015: Wuppertaler SV

Senior career*
Years	Team	Apps	(Gls)
2016	Lokomotiv Mezdra	5	(0)
2016–2019	Pirin Blagoevgrad	10	(0)

International career
2016	Bulgaria U21	2	(0)
- * Club domestic league appearances and goals as of 15 October 2021

Manol Chapov (Bulgarian: Манол Чапов; born 25 January 1996) is a Bulgarian retired footballer who last played as a midfielder for Pirin Blagoevgrad.
