= Anthony Scribe =

French footballer (born 1988)

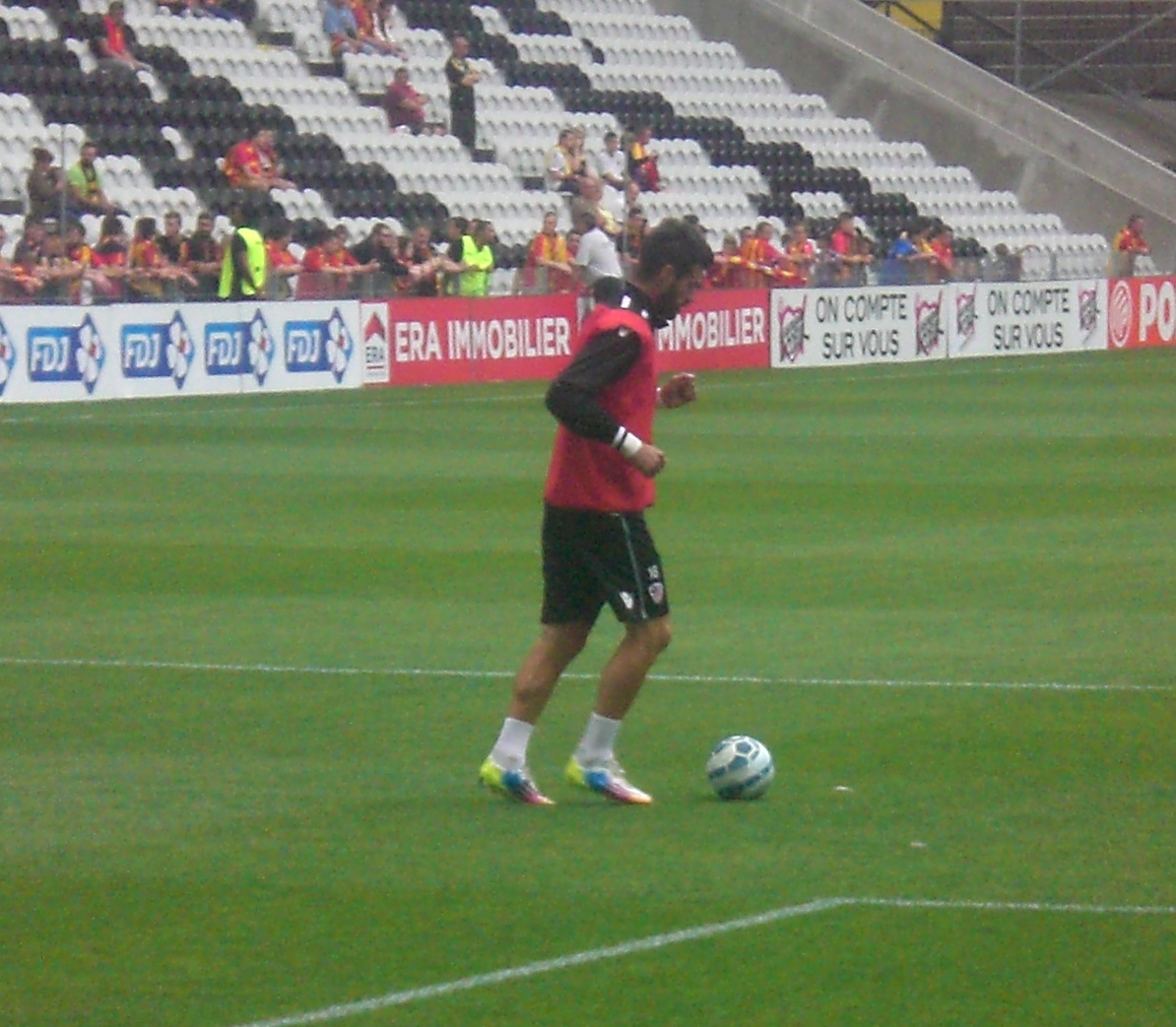
- Scribe with Ajaccio in 2015

Personal information
- Date of birth: 1 January 1988 (age 38)
- Place of birth: Saint-Germain-en-Laye, France
- Position: Goalkeeper

Team information
- Current team: US Lège Cap Ferret

Senior career*
Years	Team	Apps	(Gls)
2005–2011	Montpellier B	31	(0)
2007–2011	Montpellier	1	(0)
2008–2009	→ Croix-de-Savoie (loan)	3	(0)
2010–2011	→ Alfortville (loan)	18	(0)
2011–2013	Corte	47	(0)
2013–2016	Ajaccio	30	(0)
2016	Dinamo Tbilisi	4	(0)
2017–2018	UMS Montélimar		
2018–2020	Stade Bordelais	37	(0)
2020–	US Lège Cap Ferret	31	(0)

International career
2004–2005	France U17	3	(0)
- * Club domestic league appearances and goals as of 1 July 2022

Anthony Scribe (born 1 January 1988) is a French professional footballer who plays as a goalkeeper for US Lège Cap Ferret in the Championnat National 3.

== Career ==
Scribe played 13 minutes in the Ligue 2 for Montpellier HSC on 10 April 2008 as substitute for Karim Aït-Fana, after the red card for first keeper Geoffrey Jourdren against AC Ajaccio.
