= Marvin Diop =

French footballer (born 1992)

Personal information
- Full name: Marvin Diop
- Date of birth: 8 August 1992 (age 34)
- Place of birth: Drancy, France
- Height: 1.81 m (5 ft 11 in)
- Position: Striker

Team information
- Current team: Drancy
- Number: 23

Youth career
- –2014: Ajaccio

Senior career*
Years	Team	Apps	(Gls)
2012–2016	Ajaccio B	63	(29)
2014–2016	Ajaccio	38	(3)
2016–2017	ASM Belfort	11	(0)
2017–	JA Drancy	47	(5)
- * Club domestic league appearances and goals as of 12:04, 11 February 2019 (UTC)

Marvin Diop (born 8 August 1992) is a French footballer who plays as a striker for Championnat National side JA Drancy.

== Career ==
Diop made his Ligue 2 debut on 3 October 2014 against Chamois Niortais replacing Mouaad Madri after 74 minutes in a 0–0 home draw. He scored his first professional goal on 17 October 2014 in a 1–1 away draw against Clermont Foot.

== Career statistics ==
As of 22 June 2015

Appearances and goals by club, season and competition
Club	Season	Ligue 2		Coupe de France		Coupe de la Ligue		Continental		Total	
Club	Season	App	Goals	App	Goals	App	Goals	App	Goals	App	Goals
AC Ajaccio	2014–15	24	3	3	1	1	0	—		28	4
AC Ajaccio	Total	24	3	3	1	1	0	0	0	28	4
