= Quentin N'Gakoutou =

Central African Republic footballer (born 1994)

Personal information
- Full name: Quentin N'Gakoutou Yapéndé
- Date of birth: 10 May 1994 (age 32)
- Place of birth: Bangui, Central African Republic
- Height: 1.78 m (5 ft 10 in)
- Position: Forward

Team information
- Current team: JA Drancy

Youth career
- 2006–2009: Red Star
- 2009–2013: Monaco

Senior career*
| Years | Team | Apps | (Gls) |
| 2013–2018 | Monaco B | 52 | (20) |
| 2014 | → Arles-Avignon (loan) | 13 | (1) |
| 2015 | → Lausanne-Sport (loan) | 7 | (0) |
| 2015–2016 | → Evian (loan) | 19 | (3) |
| 2017 | → Union Saint-Gilloise (loan) | 0 | (0) |
| 2019–2020 | Bourges 18 | 10 | (5) |
| 2021 | FC 93 | 2 | (0) |
| 2022 | Romorantin | 9 | (0) |
| 2023– | Drancy | 4 | (0) |

International career^{‡}
| 2009 | France U16 | 2 | (0) |
| 2010 | France U17 | 3 | (0) |
| 2018–2019 | Central African Republic | 6 | (0) |
- * Club domestic league appearances and goals as of 03:27, 10 April 2025 (UTC) ‡ National team caps and goals as of 03:27, 10 April 2025 (UTC)

Quentin N'Gakoutou Yapéndé (born 10 May 1994) is a Central African professional footballer who plays as a forward for Championnat National 3 club Drancy.

== Club career ==
A youth player of Monaco, Ngakoutou gained first-team playing time on loan at Arles-Avignon in 2014, where he made his professional debut in a 0–0 Ligue 2 draw against Ajaccio. After a short experience in Switzerland with Lausanne, Ngakoutou was loaned again in Ligue 2 to Evian in July 2015. After a relatively good season with Evian, in July 2016, he went on trial with Ligue 1 side Bastia but did not convince the club. In January 2017, he went on trial at EFL League One side Bolton Wanderers but did not convince the club and on 31 January 2017, he was loaned for six months to Belgian second division side Union Saint-Gilloise. In July 2017, he went on trial at Belgian second division side Cercle Brugge but failed to convince the club and stayed at Monaco for one more season. On 1 July 2018, his contract with Monaco expired and he was released after seven years with the club.

After nearly two years without playing professional football, in July 2019, N'Gakoutou was tested in two clubs, he first went on trial at EFL League Two side Swindon Town and after with the French fourth division team Annecy but did not convince either of the two clubs and ended up signing a one-year contract with the French fifth division club Bourges 18, where he scored 5 goals in 10 matches before the COVID-19 pandemic permanently interrupted competition in France.

In January 2022, N'Gakoutou signed for French club Romorantin.

== International career ==
N'Gakoutou was born in the Central African Republic to a Central African father and Gabonese mother, and moved to France at a young age. He is a former youth international of France, but in September 2018, the 24-year-old made his international debut for his country of birth, the Central African Republic in the 2019 Africa Cup of Nations qualification match against Guinea on 9 September 2018.

== Personal life ==
Quentin is the brother of the footballers Yanis and Wesley N'Gakoutou, Gabon and Central African Republic international respectively.

== Career statistics ==
As of 9 January 2022

Appearances and goals by club, season and competition
| Club | Season | League | | | National Cup | | League Cup | | Other | | Total | |
| Club | Season | Division | Apps | Goals | Apps | Goals | Apps | Goals | Apps | Goals | Apps | Goals |
|---|---|---|---|---|---|---|---|---|---|---|---|---|
| Monaco B | 2011–12 | Championnat de France Amateur | 11 | 3 | — | | — | | — | | 11 | 3 |
| Monaco B | 2012–13 | Championnat de France Amateur | 13 | 3 | — | | — | | — | | 13 | 3 |
| Monaco B | 2013–14 | Championnat de France Amateur | 28 | 14 | — | | — | | — | | 28 | 14 |
| Monaco B | Monaco II | | 52 | 20 | — | | — | | — | | 52 | 20 |
| AC Arles-Avignon (loan) | 2014–15 | Ligue 2 | 13 | 1 | 0 | 0 | 1 | 3 | — | | 14 | 4 |
| Lausanne-Sport (loan) | 2014–15 | Swiss Challenge League | 7 | 0 | 0 | 0 | — | | — | | 7 | 0 |
| Evian B (loan) | 2015–16 | Championnat de France Amateur 2 | 5 | 4 | — | | — | | — | | 5 | 4 |
| Evian (loan) | 2015–16 | Ligue 2 | 19 | 3 | 2 | 0 | 1 | 0 | — | | 22 | 3 |
| Saint-Gilloise (loan) | 2016–17 | Belgian First Division B | 0 | 0 | 0 | 0 | — | | 1 (Note: Appearance in the Belgian "Europa League" play-off) | 0 | 1 | 0 |
| Bourges 18 | 2019–20 | Championnat National 3 | 10 | 5 | 0 | 0 | — | | — | | 10 | 5 |
| FC 93 | 2021–22 | Championnat National 2 | 2 | 0 | 0 | 0 | — | | — | | 2 | 0 |
| Romorantin | 2021–22 | Championnat National 2 | 0 | 0 | 0 | 0 | — | | — | | 0 | 0 |
| Career total | | | 108 | 33 | 2 | 0 | 2 | 3 | 1 | 0 | 113 | 36 |
