= Fabrice Begeorgi =

French footballer (born 1987)

Personal information
- Full name: Fabrice Pierre Begeorgi Cabezas
- Date of birth: 20 April 1987 (age 39)
- Place of birth: Martigues, France
- Height: 1.77 m (5 ft 10 in)
- Position: Left back

Youth career
- Marseille

Senior career*
Years	Team	Apps	(Gls)
2006–2009	Marseille	0	(0)
2006–2007	→ Libourne (loan)	22	(3)
2007–2008	→ Amiens (loan)	5	(0)
2008	→ TuS Koblenz (loan)	11	(1)
2009	→ Werder Bremen II (loan)	9	(0)
2009–2010	Istres	23	(3)
2010–2015	Ajaccio	68	(0)
2013–2014	→ Uzès (loan)	16	(0)
2016	Petrolul Ploiești	11	(1)
2016–2017	UE Engordany	14	(1)
2017–2018	Le Pontet	18	(2)
2018–2019	Sant Julià		
- * Club domestic league appearances and goals

Fabrice Pierre Begeorgi Cabezas (born 20 April 1987) is a French former footballer who played as a left-back.

== Career ==
Begeorgi played for French lower league sides FC Libourne-Saint-Seurin and Amiens SC as well as for German 2. Bundesliga side TuS Koblenz in loan deals. In January 2009 he joined the third division reserve team of Werder Bremen on loan. He returned to Marseille on 30 June 2009.

On 21 June 2010, the attacking midfielder of FC Istres signed a two-year deal with AC Ajaccio. Begeorgi made his Ligue 2 debut on 3 October 2014 after being loaned in the 2013–14 season. His debut came against Niortais at the Stade Francois Coty.
