= Pépé Guilavogui =

Guinean footballer

Pepe Guilavogui
Personal information
- Date of birth: 2 June 1993 (age 33)
- Place of birth: Conakry, Guinea
- Height: 1.69 m (5 ft 7 in)
- Position: Midfielder

Senior career*
Years	Team	Apps	(Gls)
2012	Rayo Vallecano B	1	(0)
2013–2014	Atlético Madrid B	0	(0)
–2015	CS Bretigny		
2016	Spartak Trnava juniori	8	(1)
2016–2017	ViOn Zlaté Moravce	28	(2)
2020	Stade Bordelais	1	(0)
2020	Orihuela CF	0	(0)

International career
2016	Guinea U20	2	(0)
2015	Guinea	1	(0)
- * Club domestic league appearances and goals as of 16:05, 8 September 2020 (UTC)

Pepe Guilavogui (born 2 June 1993) is a Guinean footballer who plays as a midfielder.

== Club career ==
Guilavogui made his professional Fortuna Liga debut for ViOn Zlaté Moravce against Spartak Myjava on 16 July 2016.

== International career ==
Guilavogui represented the Guinea U20s at the 2016 Toulon Tournament.
