= Ondřej Machuča =

Czechfootballer (born 1996)

Personal information
- Full name: Ondřej Machuča
- Date of birth: 24 April 1996 (age 30)
- Place of birth: Velké Heraltice, Czech Republic
- Height: 1.80 m (5 ft 11 in)
- Position: Midfielder

Team information
- Current team: FK Třinec

Youth career
- Opava

Senior career*
Years	Team	Apps	(Gls)
2015–2019	Slovan Liberec	12	(0)
2017	→ ViOn Zlaté Moravce (loan)	8	(0)
2017–2018	→ Znojmo (loan)	22	(0)
2018–2019	→ Vysočina Jihlava (loan)	20	(0)
2019–2020	Baník Sokolov	21	(1)
2020–2021	Orion Tip Sereď	22	(0)
2022–	Fotbal Třinec	0	(0)

International career
2016	Czech Republic U23	5	(0)
- * Club domestic league appearances and goals as of 17:08, 25 January 2022 (UTC)

Ondřej Machuča (born 24 April 1996) is a Czech footballer who plays for FK Třinec as a midfielder.

== Career ==
=== Baník Sokolov ===
On 28 August 2019, Machuča signed with Baník Sokolov.
