= Benoît Lesoimier =

French footballer (born 1983)

Benoit Lesoimier
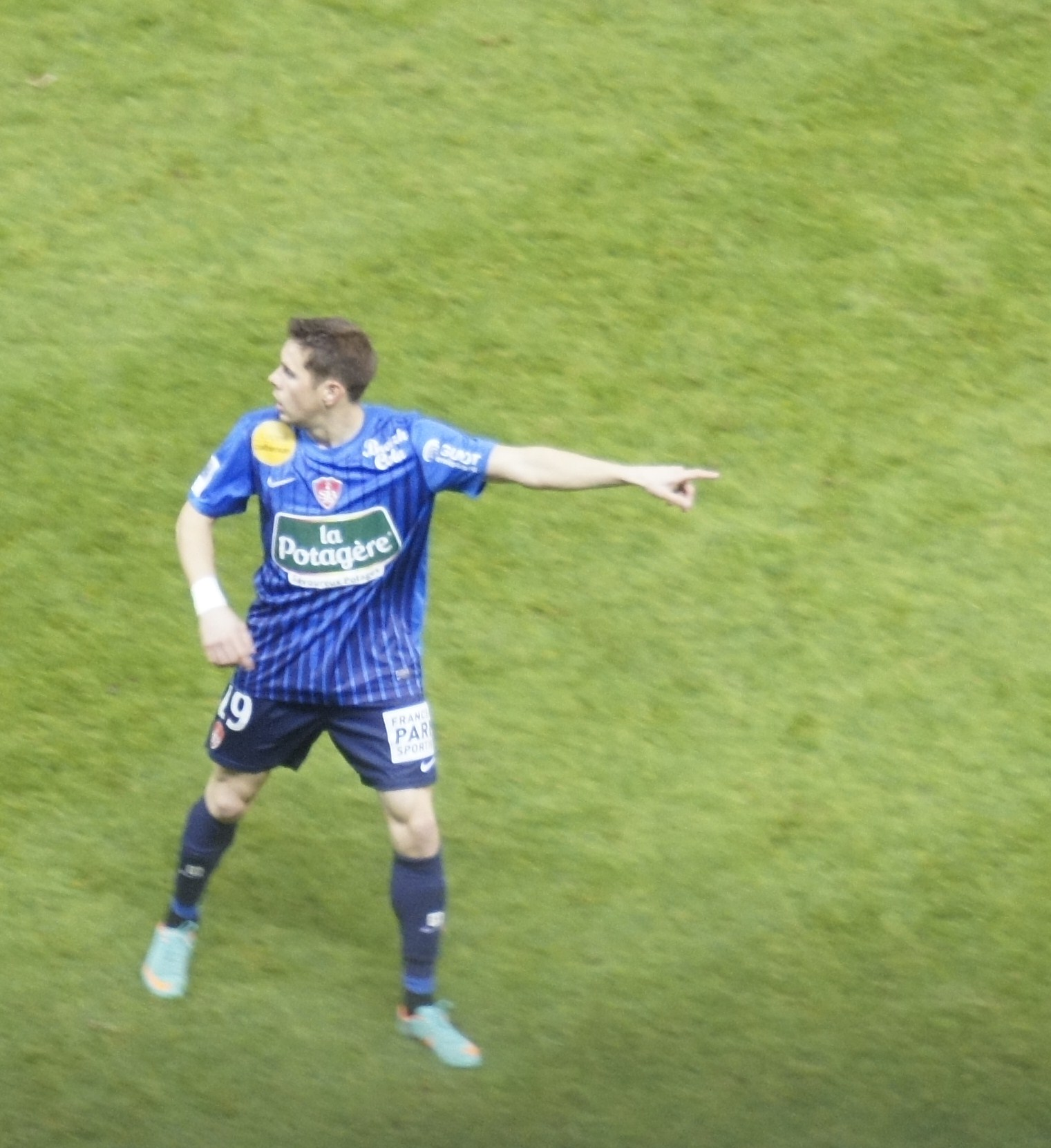

Personal information
- Date of birth: February 21, 1983 (age 43)
- Place of birth: Saint-Lô, France
- Height: 1.71 m (5 ft 7 in)
- Position: Midfielder

Senior career*
| Years | Team | Apps | (Gls) |
| 2002–2006 | Caen | 39 | (1) |
| 2006–2008 | Clermont | 64 | (17) |
| 2008–2009 | Troyes | 32 | (3) |
| 2009–2014 | Brest | 146 | (13) |
| 2014–2015 | Ajaccio | 26 | (1) |
| Total | | 307 | (35) |
- * Club domestic league appearances and goals

Benoit Lesoimier (born 21 February 1983) is a French former professional footballer who played as a midfielder.
