= Wesley N'Gakoutou =

Central African footballer (born 2001)

Personal information
- Full name: Wesley Yohan N'Gakoutou-Yapende
- Date of birth: 18 August 2001 (age 25)
- Place of birth: Clichy, France
- Position: Winger

Team information
- Current team: Nîmes

Youth career
- 2008–2009: Strasbourg
- 2009–2011: Schiltigheim
- 2011–2012: Vauban Strasbourg
- 2012–2014: AS Strasbourg
- 2014–2016: Kehler FV
- 2016–2017: FC Geispolsheim 01
- 2017–2019: Haguenau
- 2019–2020: ASPTT Dijon

Senior career*
| Years | Team | Apps | (Gls) |
| 2020–2021 | Haguenau II | 0 | (0) |
| 2021–2022 | Chambly II | 6 | (0) |
| 2022–2023 | Nîmes II | 0 | (0) |
| 2023– | Nîmes | 12 | (0) |
| 2024–2025 | → GOAL FC (loan) | 0 | (0) |

International career^{‡}
| 2024– | Central African Republic | 4 | (0) |
- * Club domestic league appearances and goals as of 03:18, 13 June 2025 (UTC) ‡ National team caps and goals as of 03:18, 13 June 2025 (UTC)

Wesley Yohan N'Gakoutou-Yapende (born 18 August 2001) is a professional footballer who plays as a winger for Nîmes. Born in France, he plays for the Central African Republic national team.

== Club career ==
N'Gakoutou is a youth product of the academies of Strasbourg, Schiltigheim, Vauban Strasbourg, AS Strasbourg, Kehler FV, Geispolsheim, Haguenau and ASPTT Dijon. He joined Nîmes in 2022 originally playing for their reserves, and debuted for their senior team in a 3–1 Ligue 2 win over Sochaux on 2 June 2023. On 11 July 2023 he signed his first professional contract with Nîmes. On 20 August 2024, he joined GOAL FC on loan in the Championnat National 2.

== International career ==
N'Gakoutou was born in France to a Central Africa Republic father and Serbian mother. He was called up to the Central African Republic national team for a set of friendlies in March 2024.

== Personal life ==
Wesley is the youngest brothers of the professional footballers Quentin N'Gakoutou and Yannis N'Gakoutou, who played international football for Central African Republic and Gabon respectively. He was born in a large family as one of 14 children.
