= Modibo Dembélé =

Malian footballer (born 1993)

Personal information
- Date of birth: 14 August 1993 (age 33)
- Place of birth: Thiais, France
- Height: 1.82 m (6 ft 0 in)
- Position: Defensive midfielder

Team information
- Current team: Sainte-Geneviève
- Number: 26

Senior career*
Years	Team	Apps	(Gls)
2013–2017	Laval B	55	(7)
2015–2017	Laval	29	(0)
2017–2018	Brescia	0	(0)
2018–2019	US Villejuif		
2019–	Sainte-Geneviève	11	(0)

International career
2016	Mali U23	2	(0)
- * Club domestic league appearances and goals as of 13:21, 22 February 2020 (UTC)

Modibo Dembélé (born 14 August 1993) is a footballer who plays as a defensive midfielder for Sainte-Geneviève Sports. Born in France, he represented Mali at youth level.

== International ==
Dembélé was called up to the Mali national under-20 football team for the 2016 Toulon Tournament, and made his debut in a 3–3 tie with the Mexico U20s.
