= Issa Baradji =

Malian footballer (born 1995)

Personal information
- Full name: Issa Baradji
- Date of birth: 15 June 1995 (age 31)
- Place of birth: Créteil, France
- Height: 1.87 m (6 ft 2 in)
- Position: Striker

Team information
- Current team: Bobigny AC

Youth career
- –2013: Guingamp
- 2013–2014: Ajaccio

Senior career*
Years	Team	Apps	(Gls)
2013–2015	Ajaccio	13	(3)
2015–2016	RWS Bruxelles	2	(1)
2015–2016	→ SR Colmar (loan)	0	(0)
2016–2017	Red Star	9	(0)
2017	Gil Vicente	0	(0)
2017–2018	Trélissac	16	(2)
2018	Feignies Aulnoye	2	(0)
2019–	Bobigny AC	4	(0)

International career
2016	Mali U23	4	(0)
- * Club domestic league appearances and goals as of 1 August 2020

Issa Baradji (born 15 June 1995) is a footballer who plays as a forward for Bobigny AC. Born in France, he represented Mali at youth level.

== Club career ==
Baradji made his Ligue 1 debut on 22 March 2014 against Valenciennes FC in a 3–2 away win scoring the two last goals of the game.

In January 2015, he signed with Belgian side R. White Star Bruxelles.

== International career ==
Baradji was born in France and is of Malian and Ivorian descent. Baradji was called up to the Mali national under-20 football team for the 2016 Toulon Tournament, and made his debut in a 1–0 loss to the Czech Republic U20s as a 51-minute sub.
