= Paul Babiloni =

French footballer (born 1990)

Personal information
- Full name: Paul Babiloni
- Date of birth: 16 January 1990 (age 36)
- Place of birth: Limoges, France
- Height: 1.80 m (5 ft 11 in)
- Position: Left back

Youth career
- Châteauroux
- 2008–2012: Guingamp

Senior career*
Years	Team	Apps	(Gls)
2012–2014	Guingamp	7	(0)
2014–2017	Ajaccio	31	(0)
2015–2017	→ Ajaccio B	16	(0)
2017–2019	FC Villefranche	10	(0)
- * Club domestic league appearances and goals

Paul Babiloni (born 16 January 1990) is a French retired footballer.

== Career ==
Babiloni started his career at Guingamp and on 3 May 2012, he signed a one-year professional contract. He made his professional debut on 7 August 2012 in a 1–0 defeat over AC Arles-Avignon in the Coupe de la Ligue, substituting Thierry Argelier. Three days later, he made his league debut starting the game at Angers.
