= Mouaad Madri =

French footballer (born 1990)

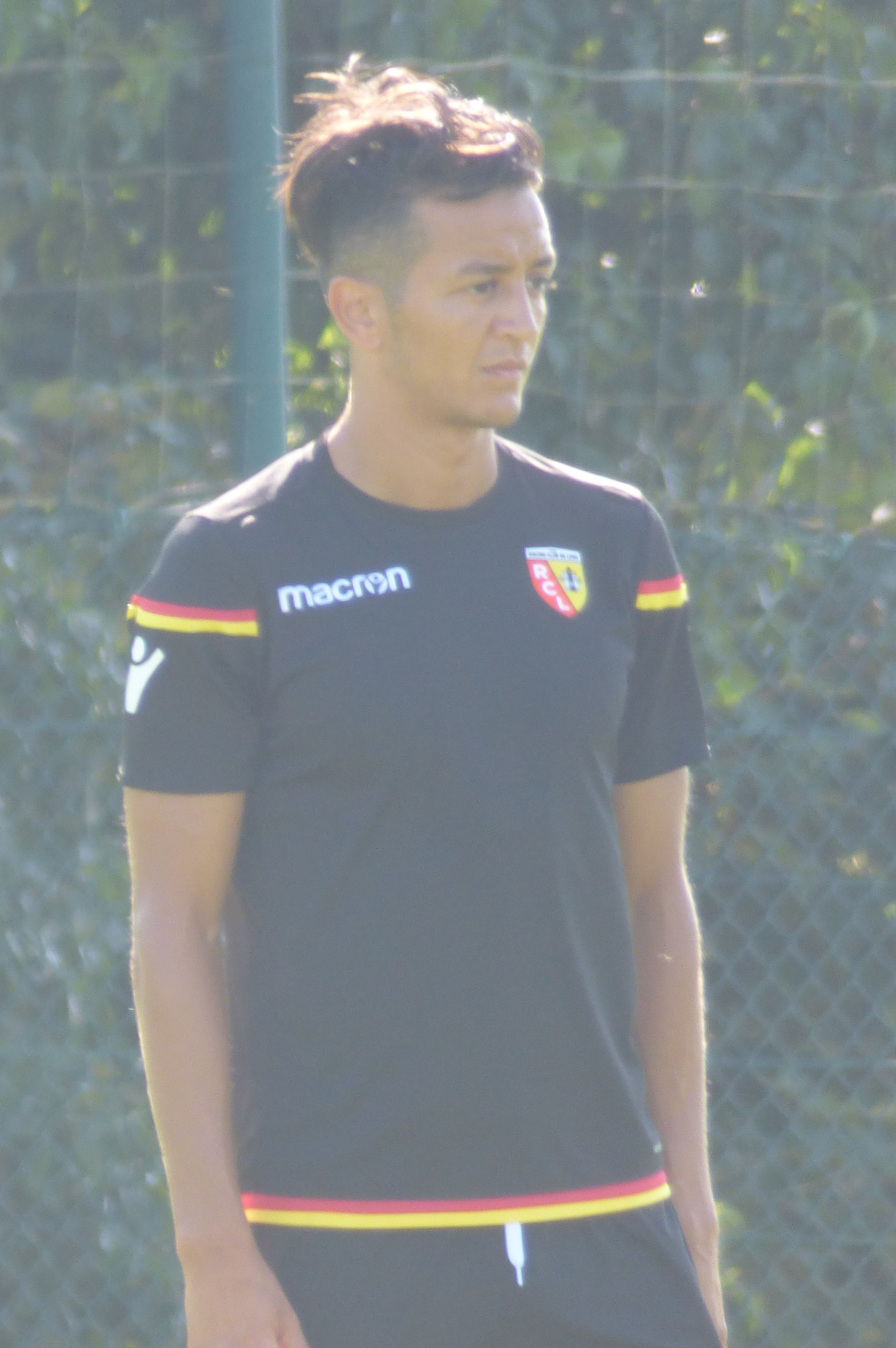
- Madri training with Lens in August 2018

Personal information
- Date of birth: 9 April 1990 (age 36)
- Place of birth: Saint-Pol-sur-Mer, France
- Height: 1.77 m (5 ft 10 in)
- Position: Striker

Youth career
- 2003–2008: Dunkerque Sud
- 2008–2009: Rouen

Senior career*
Years	Team	Apps	(Gls)
2009–2014	Dunkerque	86	(25)
2014–2017	Ajaccio	90	(12)
2017–2020	Lens	3	(0)
2018–2020	Lens B	9	(2)
2022	Le Touquet	1	(0)
2023	Grande-Synthe		
- * Club domestic league appearances and goals as of 19:08, 21 July 2023 (UTC)

Mouaad Madri (born 9 April 1990) is a French professional footballer who plays as a striker. He has notably played for Dunkerque, Ajaccio, Manchester United, and Lens.

== Career ==
In June 2017, Madri joined Lens. In 2023, he joined Grande-Synthe in the Régional 1.

== Personal life ==
Mouaad Madri was born in Saint-Pol-sur-Mer, in the North of France. He holds French and Moroccan nationalities.
