= Grenddy Perozo =

Venezuelan footballer (born 1986)

Personal information
- Full name: Grenddy Adrián Perozo Rincón
- Date of birth: 28 February 1986 (age 40)
- Place of birth: Maracaibo, Venezuela
- Height: 1.82 m (6 ft 0 in)
- Position: Centre back

Team information
- Current team: Junior (assistant)

Youth career
- 1998–2002: Trujillanos

Senior career*
Years	Team	Apps	(Gls)
2002–2005	Trujillanos	74	(5)
2005–2007	Táchira	28	(5)
2007–2010	Anzoátegui	79	(4)
2010–2013	Boyacá Chicó	39	(3)
2012	→ Olimpo (loan)	7	(1)
2013	→ Táchira (loan)	14	(1)
2013–2015	Ajaccio	46	(2)
2015	Zulia	12	(0)
2016	Atlético CP	15	(2)
2016–2017	Sport Boys Warnes	35	(1)
2017–2018	Zulia	43	(6)
2019–2020	Carabobo	37	(11)
2020	Atlético Venezuela	17	(0)
2021–2023	Monagas	41	(1)

International career
2006–2014	Venezuela	44	(2)

Managerial career
- 2024: Monagas U21
- 2024: Monagas
- 2024–: Junior (assistant)
- * Club domestic league appearances and goals

Grenddy Adrián Perozo Rincón (born 28 February 1986) is a Venezuelan football manager and former player who played as a centre back. He is the current assistant manager of Colombian club Junior.

== International career ==
Perozo is a central defender who can also play as a defensive midfielder. He has been noted for his physical style and tackling ability, and has been a regular member of the Venezuela national team earning 44 caps and scoring two goals.

== International goals ==
No.	Date	Venue	Opponent	Score	Result	Competition	Ref.
1.	1 June 2011	Estadio Mateo Flores, Guatemala City, Guatemala	Guatemala	0–2	0–2	Friendly	
2.	13 July 2011	Estadio Padre Ernesto Martearena, Salta, Argentina	Paraguay	3–3	3–3	2011 Copa América	
