= Johann Ramaré =

French footballer and manager (born 1984)

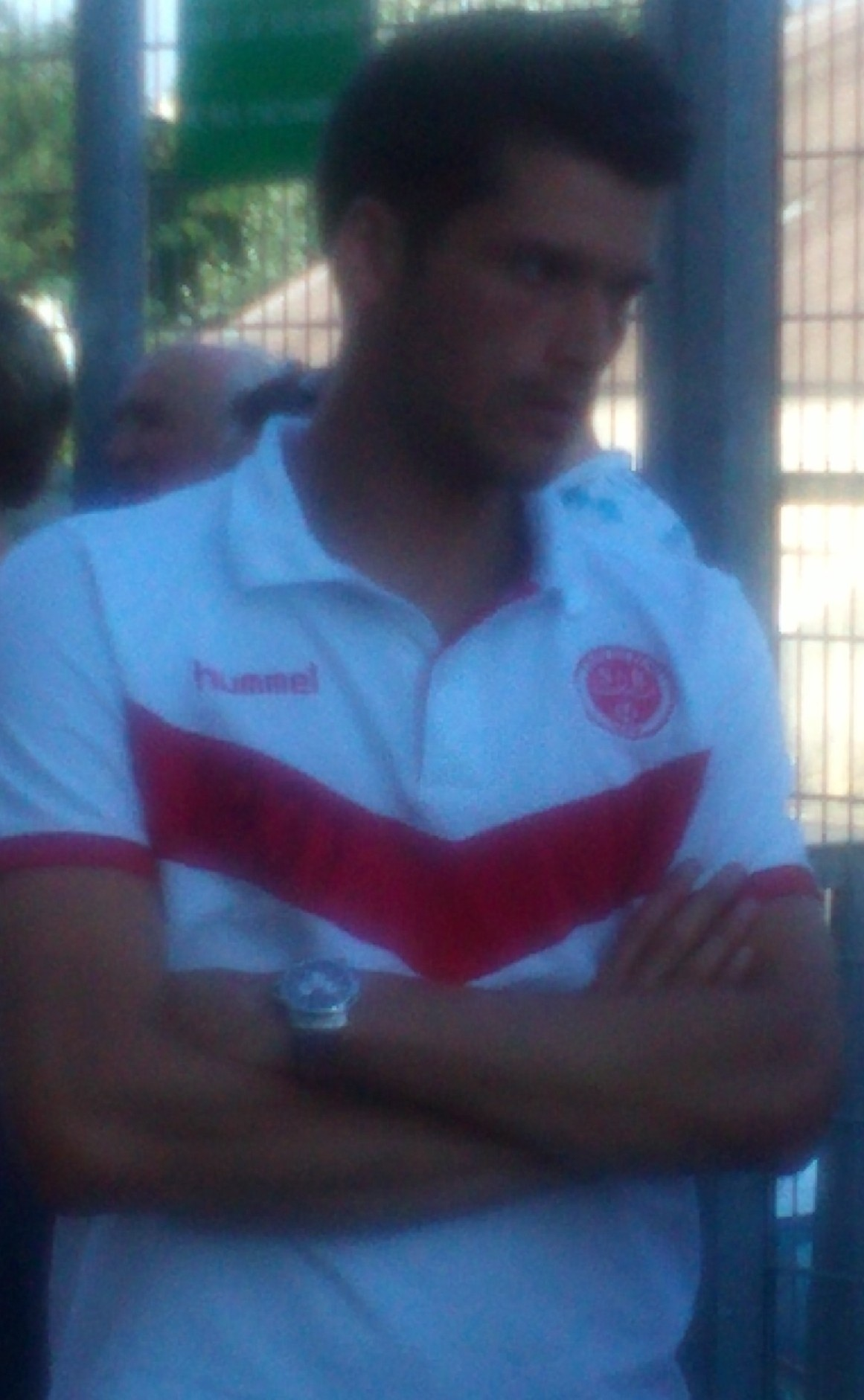

Personal information
- Date of birth: 5 June 1984 (age 42)
- Place of birth: Rennes, France
- Height: 1.78 m (5 ft 10 in)
- Position: Midfielder

Team information
- Current team: Rennes (assistant coach)

Youth career
- 1992–1997: JA Mordelles
- 1997–2003: Rennes

Senior career*
Years	Team	Apps	(Gls)
2003–2006	Rennes B	78	(1)
2006–2010	Boulogne	122	(6)
2010–2013	Reims	47	(0)
2013–2015	Brest	71	(1)
2015–2017	Sochaux	44	(1)
2017–2019	Valenciennes	60	(2)

Managerial career
- 2019–2023: Brest (U17 assistant)
- 2023–2024: RC Lens (assistant)
- 2024––2025: Nice (assistant)
- 2026–: Rennes (assistant)
- * Club domestic league appearances and goals

Johann Ramaré (born 5 June 1984) is a retired French football midfielder. he is the currently assistant coach of Ligue 1 club Rennes.

== Career ==
Born in Rennes, Ramaré began his career with JA Mordelles and joined 1997 in the youth team of Stade Rennais. He was part of the reserve team until 2006, when he joined US Boulogne, then of the Championnat National. He has been an integral part of the club since then, wearing the number eight shirt, and helping his side to promotion to French Ligue 2. On 26 May 2010, the 25-year-old midfielder, whose contract with Boulogne had expired, signed a two-year deal with Stade Reims. His contract was not renewed at the end of this deal. On 24 July 2013, he signed a three-year deal with Stade Brestois in Ligue 2.

Ramaré retired at the end of the 2018-19 season. On 1 September 2019 Brest announced, that he had returned to the club as the assistant manager of the U17 squad.
