= Julien François =

French footballer (born 1979)

Personal information
- Date of birth: 21 September 1979 (age 47)
- Place of birth: Metz, France
- Height: 1.92 m (6 ft 4 in)
- Position: Midfielder

Team information
- Current team: Thionville (manager)

Youth career
- 1996–2000: Metz

Senior career*
Years	Team	Apps	(Gls)
2000–2001	GFC Ajaccio	31	(0)
2001–2002	Metz	0	(0)
2002–2006	Grenoble	129	(12)
2006–2009	Metz	81	(3)
2009–2010	Tours	55	(1)
2010–2013	Le Havre	59	(2)
2013–2015	GFC Ajaccio	42	(4)

Managerial career
- 2016–2019: Gazélec Ajaccio
- 2023: Amnéville
- 2021–: Thionville
- * Club domestic league appearances and goals

Julien François (born 21 September 1979) is a retired French professional footballer who played as a midfielder. They currently manager of Thionville.

== Career ==
Born in Metz, Julien started his career at FC Metz, and also played for Gazélec Ajaccio and Grenoble, in Ligue 2. He played at Grenoble for four seasons before returning to FC Metz in the summer of 2006. He signed for Tours FC in January 2009. In June 2010, AC Le Havre signed the midfielder on a two-year contract, he joined on a free transfers from Tours FC.

== Managerial career ==
On 28 July 2021, François was announce official manager of Thionville which had just merged to Regional 2, through the president of the Thionville Club, François Ventrici, whom he had known during his time at CSO Amnéville.
