= JA Drancy =

French football club

- Full name: Jeanne d'Arc de Drancy
- Founded: 1903
- Ground: Stade Charles Sage; Drancy, Seine-Saint-Denis
- Capacity: 2,500
- Chairman: (France) Melaye Alain
- Manager: (France) Philippe Lemaître
- League: National 3
- 2024–25: National 3 Group E, 7th
- Website: ja-drancy.com
Home colours	Away colours

La Jeanne d'Arc de Drancy (French pronunciation: [la ʒan daʁk də dʁɑ̃si]; abbreviated as JAD; French pronunciation: [ʒi.a.de]) is a French football club based in Drancy, a suburb of Paris. The club was founded in 1903. As of the 2025–26 season, the club plays in the Championnat National 3, the fifth division of French football.

== Current status ==
Jeanne d'Arc de Drancy have achieved numerous honors in the amateur section of French football in the 21st century resulting in the club reaching the Championnat de France amateur for the 2009-10 season. In 2003, the club won the Ligue d'Excellence of its region and, the following year, won its region's Ligue d'Promotion. The next year, the club achieved promotion again, winning the Division d'Honneur Régionale and followed this up with another promotion run, this time winning the Division Supérieure Régionale meaning Drancy had reached the 6th division of French football, the Division d'Honneur. In 2007, the club finished 2nd achieving promotion to the CFA 2, however they were relegated back down after they failed to meet the league's financial requirements and expectations. A year later, Drancy won the league and were accepted into CFA 2 and proceeded to win its group after just one year in the league and were accepting into the Championnat de France amateur.

In 2018, Jeanne d'Arc de Drancy were promoted to Championnat National for the first time in the club's history after finishing first in the Championnat National 2. After just one season they were relegated back to National 2 on 3 May 2019. A further relegation to National 3 followed when the 2019–20 season was ended early due to the COVID-19 pandemic.

== Coupe de France success ==
Despite the club's amateur status, they have played well in France's most prestigious cup competition, the Coupe de France. From 2003 to 2007, Drancy reached as far as the 8th round, where Ligue 1 clubs enter. In 2006, they reached the Round of 32 before losing to professional club Metz. Twice consecutively, in 2011 and 2012, Drancy reached Round of 16.

== Current squad ==
As of 15 April 2019

Note: Flags indicate national team as defined under FIFA eligibility rules; some limited exceptions apply. Players may hold more than one non-FIFA nationality.

No.	Pos.	Nation	Player
1	GK	FRA	Clément Lume
2	DF	FRA	Gustave Akueson
3	DF	COM	Abdallah Imamo
4	MF	FRA	Souleymane Coulibaly
6	MF	FRA	Mamadou Magassouba
7	MF	FRA	Aziz Dahchour
8	MF	FRA	Bakari Camara
9	MF	CMR	Serge Bando N'Gambé
10	MF	LIE	Guillaume Khous
12	MF	FRA	Nianankoro Doumbia
14	FW	FRA	Benjamin Gomel (on loan from Lens)
15	DF	FRA	Bakary Sissoko (on loan from Troyes)
16	GK	FRA	Didier Desprez (on loan from Lens)
17	DF	FRA	Djessy Basimba

No.	Pos.	Nation	Player
18	MF	FRA	Mamadou Danfa
19	FW	CIV	Anderson Banvo
20	DF	FRA	Ousmane Samba
21	DF	FRA	Martin Ekani
22	MF	FRA	Abderrahmane Sanogo
23	FW	FRA	Marvin Diop
24	DF	FRA	Cédric Jean-Etienne
25	MF	FRA	Bilal El Hajjam
26	FW	FRA	Dramane Koné
27	FW	FRA	Aboubakar Koné
28	DF	FRA	Clement Cabaton
29	FW	ALG	Hakeem Achour
30	GK	FRA	Sébastien Mpeck Makendi
32	MF	FRA	Maguette Diongue

== Famous players ==
- (France) Rayan Fofana (youth)
- (France) Youssouf Fofana (youth)
- (France) Jean-Philippe Mateta (youth)
