= Johan Cavalli =

French footballer (born 1981)

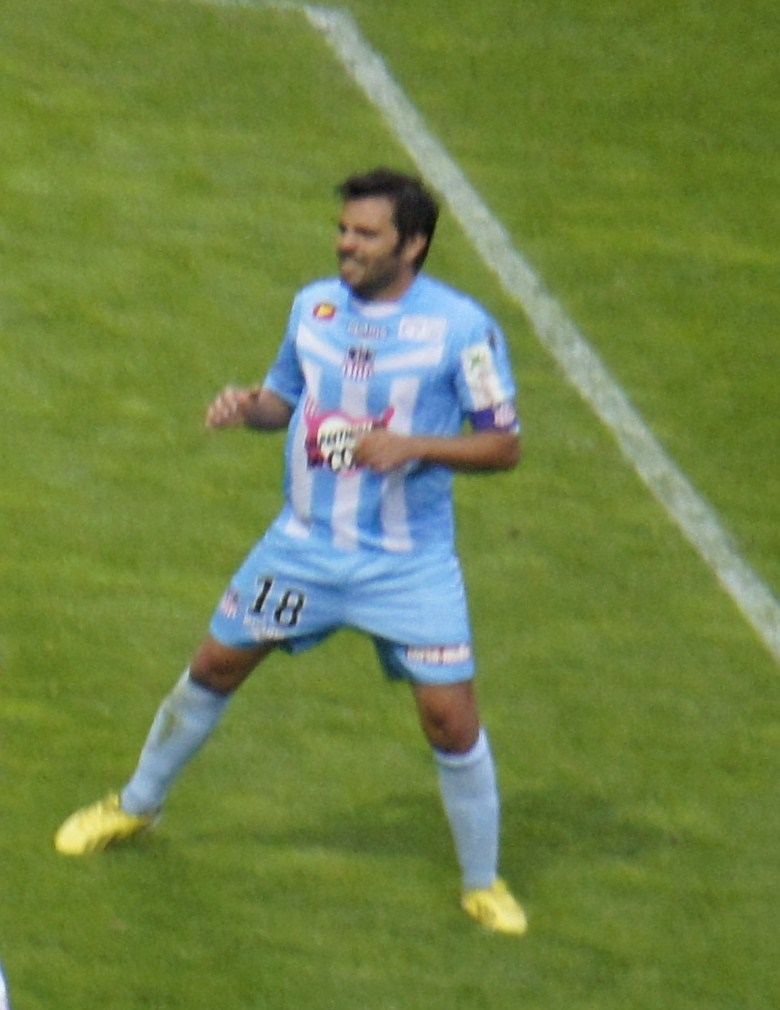
- Cavalli in 2013

Personal information
- Full name: Johan Étienne Anthony Cavalli
- Date of birth: 12 September 1981 (age 45)
- Place of birth: Ajaccio, Corsica, France
- Height: 1.70 m (5 ft 7 in)
- Position: Midfielder

Youth career
- 1997–2001: Nantes

Senior career*
Years	Team	Apps	(Gls)
2001–2003	Lorient	22	(0)
2003–2004	Créteil	44	(11)
2004–2005	Real Mallorca B	15	(0)
2005–2007	Istres	51	(2)
2007	Watford	3	(0)
2007–2008	Mons	8	(0)
2008–2010	Nîmes Olympique	51	(1)
2010–2020	Ajaccio	271	(28)
Total		465	(42)

International career
2009–2019	Corsica	10	(1)
- * Club domestic league appearances and goals

Johan Étienne Anthony Cavalli (born 12 September 1981) is a French former professional footballer who played as a midfielder.

== Club career ==
=== Early career ===
Whilst at Lorient Cavalli played as a substitute in the 2002 Coupe de France Final in which they beat SC Bastia.

=== Watford ===
Cavalli joined Watford on deadline day of the 2007 January transfer window, on a free transfer from French side Istres, signing an 18-month contract. He made his debut in the 1–0 win against West Ham United on 10 February 2007. He had his contract with "Hornets" cancelled by mutual consent on 20 August 2007.

=== Mons ===
On 18 October 2007, it was announced that Cavalli had signed a two-year contract with Belgian club Mons. In May 2008, he left the club my mutual consent.

=== Ajaccio ===
Cavalli joined his hometown club AC Ajaccio in November 2010 on a contract running until 2013.

He started on the opening day of the 2011–12 Ligue 1 season, playing 77 minutes in a 2–0 loss to Toulouse. He was also in the starting eleven for Ajaccio's trip to the Stade Gerland the following weekend and played 78 minutes in a 1–1 draw with hosts Lyon. In Ajaccio 1–1 draw against fellow Ligue 1 newcomers Evian on 20 August 2011 he set up midfield partner Frédéric Sammaritano for the 7th-minute 1–0 lead following a "great combination" between him and Benjamin André.

Following a five-match suspension, Cavalli returned on 10 April 2015 to face Dijon. He scored via penalty as Ajaccio beat Dijon 1–0 at the Stade François Coty.

At the end of the 2019–20 season, after ten years with Ajaccio, Cavalli retired from playing.

== International career ==
Cavalli was capped for the Corsica national football team, which is not a FIFA member, as it does not represent a fully sovereign nation. On 31 May 2011, he scored the only goal to help his team to a prestigious 1–0 win over Bulgaria in a friendly match.

== Personal life ==
Cavalli's father Jean-Michel is also a former footballer and coached him during his time at Créteil.
