= Julien Delonglée =

French footballer (born 1983)

Personal information
- Date of birth: March 23, 1983 (age 43)
- Place of birth: Montfermeil, France
- Height: 1.84 m (6 ft 0 in)
- Position: Midfielder

Senior career*
Years	Team	Apps	(Gls)
2001–2002	Beauvais B		
2002–2004	Beauvais	41	(2)
2004–2006	Orléans		
2006–2008	Romorantin	28	(1)
2008–2009	Saint-Pryvé Saint-Hilaire		
2009–2016	Orléans	203	(6)
2016–2018	Chartres	41	(4)
2018	C'Chartres	0	(0)
2018–2020	Saint-Pryvé Saint-Hilaire	8	(0)
- * Club domestic league appearances and goals as of 02:54, 23 January 2022 (UTC)

Julien Delonglée (born 23 March 1983) is a French professional footballer who plays as a midfielder.
