= Nicolas Fauvergue =

French footballer (born 1984)

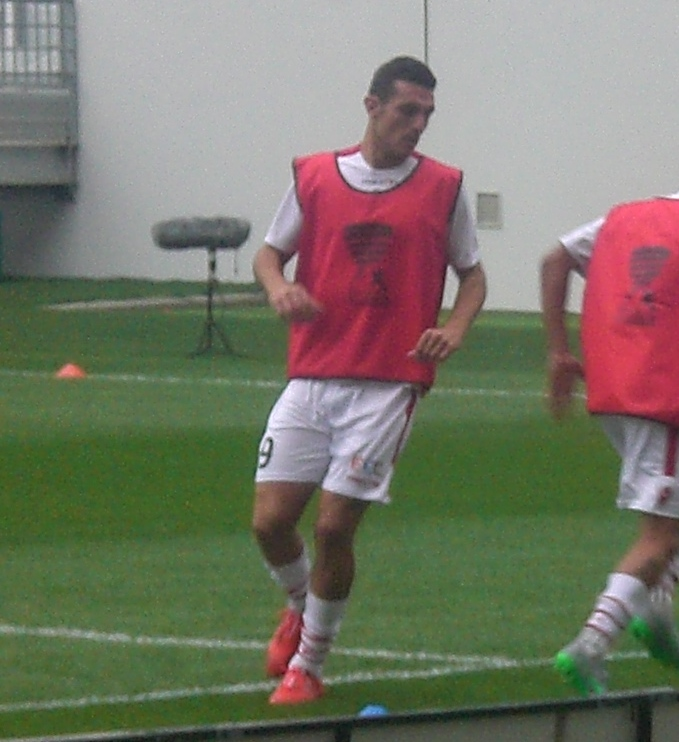
- Fauvergue in 2015

Personal information
- Full name: Nicolas Jean-Renaud Fauvergue
- Date of birth: 13 October 1984 (age 42)
- Place of birth: Béthune, Pas-de-Calais, France
- Height: 1.93 m (6 ft 4 in)
- Position: Forward

Senior career*
Years	Team	Apps	(Gls)
2003–2011	Lille	101	(11)
2009–2010	→ Strasbourg (loan)	26	(13)
2010–2011	→ Sedan (loan)	31	(9)
2011–2012	Sedan	30	(12)
2012–2014	Reims	23	(2)
2013–2014	→ Metz (loan)	28	(5)
2014–2015	Ajaccio	35	(12)
2015–2016	Paris FC	14	(0)
- * Club domestic league appearances and goals

Nicolas Jean-Renaud Fauvergue (French pronunciation: [nikɔla fovɛʁɡ]; born 13 October 1984) is a French former professional footballer who played as a forward.

== Early life ==
Nicolas Jean-Renaud Fauvergue was born on 13 October 1984 in Béthune, a town in the Pas-de-Calais department of France.

== Career ==
On 5 August 2009, RC Strasbourg signed Fauverge on loan from OSC Lille. On 23 June 2010, CS Sedan Ardennes signed him on loan for a year from OSC Lille, with a call option.

In June 2014, after winning the Ligue 2 with Metz in the previous season, he signed a two-year contract with relegated side AC Ajaccio.

On 28 August 2015, Fauvergue left AC Ajaccio in order to sign for Paris FC.

== Honours ==
Lille

- UEFA Intertoto Cup: 2004
