= 2019–20 Coupe de France =

Tournament details
- Country: France
- Teams: 196 (from 7th round)

Final positions
- Champions: Paris Saint-Germain (13th title)
- Runners-up: Saint-Étienne

Tournament statistics
- Matches played: 211
- Goals scored: 586 (2.78 per match)
- Top goal scorer(s): Carnejy Antoine; Pablo Sarabia (7 goals each)

The 2019–20 Coupe de France was the 103rd season of the main football cup competition of France. The competition was organised by the French Football Federation (FFF) and was open to all clubs in French football, as well as clubs from the overseas departments and territories (Guadeloupe, French Guiana, Martinique, Mayotte, New Caledonia (Winner of 2019 New Caledonia Cup), Tahiti (Winner of 2018–19 Tahiti Cup), Réunion, Saint Martin, and Saint Pierre and Miquelon).

Rennes were the defending champions, but they were eliminated by Saint-Étienne in the semi-finals.

Due to the COVID-19 pandemic in France, on 28 April 2020, Prime Minister Edouard Philippe announced all sporting events in France, including those behind closed doors, would be banned until September. The FFF were considering whether the final of the Coupe de France could be rescheduled for when events are allowed to restart. On 26 June, the FFF announced that the final was rescheduled to 24 July.

Paris Saint-Germain won their record 13th title overall with a 1–0 win over Saint-Étienne in the final.

== Dates ==
Dates for the first two qualifying round were set by the individual Regional leagues. The remaining qualifying rounds, the seventh and eight round, and the round of 64 took place at weekends. The later rounds up to, but not including, the final, took place on midweek evenings. The final took place on Friday 24 July 2020.

Round	Draw Date	Matches Played
Third	various	15 September 2019
Fourth	various	29 September 2019
Fifth	various	13 October 2019
Sixth	various	27 October 2019
Seventh	29 and 30 October 2019	16 and 17 November 2019
Eighth	19 November 2019	7 and 8 December 2019
Round of 64	9 December 2019	4, 5 and 6 January 2020
Round of 32	6 January 2020	16, 17, 18 and 19 January 2020
Round of 16	19 or 20 January 2020	28, 29 and 30 January 2020
Quarter-finals	29 January 2020	11, 12 and 13 February 2020
Semi-finals	12 February 2020	4 and 5 March 2020
Final	n/a	24 July 2020

== Notable rule changes ==
For this season, there were changes in the rules of participation for Overseas Territories teams in both the seventh and eighth rounds. For Guadeloupe, French Guiana and Martinique, the seventh round match was defined as being between the two teams who qualified from the sixth round, rather than being a draw against a side from mainland France as previously.

Following the established rule regarding alternation of venue between overseas and mainland, the eighth-round games involving the teams from French Guiana and Martinique were played on mainland France regardless of the order the teams were drawn. However, if the overseas team was drawn first, the match took place at a neutral venue within 100 km of Paris. The eighth-round game involving the team from Guadeloupe took place in Guadeloupe.

== Teams ==
=== Round 1 to 6 ===
The first six rounds, and any preliminaries required, were organised by the Regional Leagues and the Overseas Territories, who allowed teams from within their league structure to enter at any point up to the third round. Teams from Championnat National 3 entered at the third round, those from Championnat National 2 entered at the fourth round and those from Championnat National entered at the fifth round.

The number of teams entering at each qualifying round was as follows:

Region	Prelim	First	Second	Third	Fourth	Fifth
Nouvelle-Aquitaine		536	70	11	4	1
Pays-de-la-Loire		438	49	32	1	2
Centre-Val de Loire		214	11	11	4	0
Corsica			14	12	1	2
Bourgogne-Franche-Comté		296	30	33	3	0
Grand Est		698	120	59	5	0
Méditerranée		180	20	9	6	1
Occitanie		356	104	11	2	1
Hauts-de-France		788	180	37	2	2
Normandie		284	70	10	3	2
Bretagne		558	81	32	4	1
Paris IDF		360	87	11	9	2
Auvergne-Rhône-Alpes		798	0	81	6	4
Réunion			20	22	0	0
Mayotte	2	63	0	0	0	0
Guadeloupe			40	12	0	0
Martinique			40	12	0	0
French Guiana				32	0	0
Saint Pierre and Miquelon		2	1 (Note: winner entered into the Auvergne-Rhône-Alpes draw)			
Total	2	5571	937	427	51	18

=== Round 7 ===
145 qualifiers from the Regional Leagues were joined by the 11 qualifiers from the Overseas Territories and the 20 teams from Ligue 2.

As of 27 October 2019

==== Ligue 2 ====
- Ajaccio
- Auxerre
- Caen
- Chambly
- Châteauroux
- Clermont
- Grenoble
- Guingamp
- Le Havre
- Le Mans
- Lens
- Lorient
- Nancy
- Niort
- Orléans
- Paris FC
- Rodez
- Sochaux
- Troyes
- Valenciennes

==== Regional Leagues ====
Figures in parentheses indicate the tier of the French football league system the team play at.

Nouvelle-Aquitaine: 12 teams

- Pau FC (3)
- Angoulême-Soyaux Charente (4)
- Bergerac Périgord FC (4)
- Trélissac FC (4)
- Aviron Bayonnais FC (5)
- Stade Montois (5)
- Stade Poitevin FC (5)
- FC Chauray (6)
- FC Nueillaubiers (6)
- OL Saint-Liguaire Niort (6)
- FC Saint-Médard-en-Jalles (6)
- JS Sireuil (7)

Pays de la Loire: 11 teams

- Stade Lavallois (3)
- Les Herbiers VF (4)
- FC Challans (5)
- Voltigeurs de Châteaubriant (5)
- Vendée Fontenay Foot (5)
- La Flèche RC (5)
- Sablé FC (5)
- Ancienne Château-Gontier (6)
- Vendée Poiré-sur-Vie Football (6)
- US La Baule-Le Pouliguen (7)
- ASI Mûrs-Erigné (7)

Centre-Val de Loire: 5 teams

- Bourges Foot (4)
- C'Chartres Football (4)
- Saint-Pryvé Saint-Hilaire FC (4)
- AS Montlouis-sur-Loire (5)
- Tours FC (5)

Corsica: 2 teams

- Gazélec Ajaccio (3)
- FC Bastia-Borgo (3)

Bourgogne-Franche-Comté: 8 teams

- ASM Belfort (4)
- Jura Sud Foot (4)
- Racing Besançon (5)
- FC Montceau Bourgogne (5)
- FC 4 Rivières 70 (6)
- AS Belfort Sud (6)
- RC Lons-le-Saunier (6)
- US La Charité (6)

Grand Est: 19 teams

- SAS Épinal (4)
- FC Mulhouse (4)
- CSO Amnéville (5)
- AS Prix-lès-Mézières (5)
- US Raon-l'Étape (5)
- US Sarre-Union (5)
- ASPV Strasbourg (5)
- ES Thaon (5)
- CA Boulay (6)
- MJEP Cormontreuil (6)
- AS Erstein (6)
- US Forbach (6)
- FC Geispolsheim 01 (6)
- FC Lunéville (6)
- EF Reims Ste Anne Châtillons (6)
- US Vandœuvre (6)
- AS Sundhoffen (7)
- SSEP Hombourg-Haut (8)
- US Oberschaeffolsheim (8)

Méditerranée: 5 teams

- Étoile Fréjus Saint-Raphaël (4)
- RC Grasse (4)
- US Marseille Endoume (4)
- EUGA Ardziv (5)
- Athlético Marseille (5)

Occitanie: 10 teams

- US Colomiers Football (4)
- RCO Agde (5)
- Olympique Alès (5)
- Auch Football (5)
- AS Fabrègues (5)
- Toulouse Rodéo FC (5)
- FC Alberes Argelès (6)
- AS Lattoise (6)
- FC Marssac-Rivières-Senouillac Rives du Tarn (6)
- L'Union Saint-Jean FC (6)

Hauts-de-France: 21 teams

- US Boulogne (3)
- USL Dunkerque (3)
- Iris Club de Croix (4)
- Olympique Saint-Quentin (4)
- Olympique Grande-Synthe (5)
- Stade Portelois (5)
- Le Touquet AC (5)
- Olympique Marcquois Football (5)
- AC Cambrai (6)
- US Gravelines (6)
- US Nœux-les-Mines (6)
- US Saint-Omer (6)
- USM Senlisienne (6)
- US Tourcoing FC (6)
- Wasquehal Football (6)
- Grand Calais Pascal FC (7)
- Olympique Lumbrois (7)
- US Pont Sainte-Maxence (7)
- US Saint-Maximin (7)
- Verton FC (9)
- AS Beauvais Oise (5)

Normandy: 8 teams

- US Quevilly-Rouen (3)
- US Granville (4)
- FC Rouen (4)
- AG Caennaise (5)
- FC Dieppe (5)
- Évreux FC 27 (5)
- ESM Gonfreville (5)
- AF Virois (5)

Brittany: 14 teams

- US Concarneau (3)
- Stade Briochin (4)
- Dinan-Léhon FC (5)
- FC Guichen (5)
- Stade Plabennécois (5)
- Stade Pontivyen (5)
- TA Rennes (5)
- SC Le Rheu (6)
- CEP Lorient (6)
- US Montagnarde (6)
- Saint-Pierre Milizac (6)
- Stade Paimpolais FC (7)
- Avenir Theix (7)
- CS Betton (8)

Paris-Île-de-France: 11 teams

- US Créteil-Lusitanos (3)
- Red Star (3)
- L'Entente SSG (4)
- Sainte-Geneviève Sports (4)
- FC Versailles 78 (5)
- ESA Linas-Montlhéry (6)
- CS Meaux (6)
- Olympique Adamois (7)
- CSM Gennevilliers (7)
- ES Nanterre (7)
- Villemomble Sports (7)

Auvergne-Rhône-Alpes: 19 teams

- Football Bourg-en-Bresse Péronnas 01 (3)
- Le Puy Foot 43 Auvergne (3)
- FC Villefranche (3)
- Annecy FC (4)
- Moulins Yzeure Foot (4)
- FC Bourgoin-Jallieu (5)
- Hauts Lyonnais (5)
- FC Limonest Saint-Didier (5)
- US Saint-Flour (5)
- Chassieu Décines FC (6)
- Thonon Évian FC (6)
- Olympique de Valence (6)
- US Annecy-le-Vieux (7)
- ES Chilly (7)
- Côte Chaude Sportif (7)
- FC Cournon-d'Auvergne (7)
- FC Lyon (7)
- US Mozac (8)
- US Saint-Galmier-Chambœuf (8)

==== Overseas Territories teams ====
French Guiana: 2 teams

- AJ Saint-Georges
- CSC Cayenne

Martinique: 2 teams

- Golden Star
- Club Franciscain

Guadeloupe: 2 teams

- AN Jeunesse Évolution
- CS Moulien

Réunion: 2 teams

- JS Saint-Pierroise
- US Sainte-Marienne

Mayotte: 1 team

- FC Mtsapéré

New Caledonia: 1 team

- Hienghène Sport

(French Polynesia) Tahiti: 1 team

- A.S. Vénus

== Seventh round ==
The draw for the seventh round took place in two parts, with three sets of ties drawn:

- Playoff ties between teams from the same overseas leagues (Guadeloupe, Martinique, French Guiana) were drawn on 29 October 2019, and took place between 6 and 8 November 2019.
- Ties pitching teams from mainland France against overseas teams (Réunion, New Caledonia, Tahiti) were also drawn on 29 October 2019, and took place on 16 and 17 November 2019.
- Ties involving just teams from mainland France were drawn on 30 October 2019, and took place on 15, 16 and 17 November 2019.

=== Overseas playoff ties ===
Ties were played between 6 and 8 November 2019.

6 November 2019	CS Moulien (Guadeloupe)	0–2	(Guadeloupe) AN Jeunesse Évolution	Les Abymes, Guadeloupe
20:00 ECT		Report	Sennoaj 45+7'; Noyon 65'	Stadium: Stade René Serge Nabajoth; Referee: Damien Nicolas Rosa

6 November 2019	Golden Star (Martinique)	0–1	(Martinique) Club Franciscain	Fort-de-France, Martinique
20:00 ECT		Report	Abaul 26'	Stadium: Stade Pierre-Aliker; Referee: Luxon Noel

8 November 2019	AJ Saint-Georges (French Guiana)	2–1	(French Guiana) CSC Cayenne	Remire-Montjoly, French Guiana
20:00 GFT	Rino 44', 88'	Report	Jean-Jacques 21'	Stadium: Stade Municipal Dr. Edmard Lama; Referee: Boris Des Bonne

=== Overseas and mainland ties ===
Ties were played on 16 and 17 November 2019.

17 November 2019	US Sainte-Marienne (Réunion)	2–3	FC Versailles 78 (5)	Saint-Denis, Réunion
15:30 UTC−10:00	Charles Henri 43'; Ichiza 65'	Report	Akassou 57', 90+3'; Fofana 77'	Stadium: Stade Jean-Ivoula; Attendance: 2,202; Referee: Jérémie Pignard

16 November 2019	A.S. Vénus (French Polynesia)	1–4	Racing Besançon (5)	Pirae, Tahiti
16:00 UTC−10:00	Barbe 63'	Report	Boudiba 48', 53'; Chi 67'; Mazeghrane 84'	Stadium: Stade Pater Te Hono Nui; Attendance: 1,500; Referee: Arnaud Baert

17 November 2019	Évreux FC 27 (5)	3–0	(Mayotte) FC Mtsapéré	Évreux
14:00 CET	N'djoli 48'; Gomis 90+3'; Landini 90+4'	Report		Stadium: Stade du 14 Juillet Madeleine; Attendance: 1,000; Referee: Clément Fabry

16 November 2019	ASPV Strasbourg (5)	3–1	(New Caledonia) Hienghène Sport	Strasbourg
17:00 CET	Oliveira Malucha 38'; Bellahcéne 84'; Kekambus 90'	Report	Athale 54'	Stadium: Stadium Emile-Stahl; Attendance: 1,000; Referee: Alexandre Mercier

16 November 2019	Jura Sud Foot (4)	0–1	(Réunion) JS Saint-Pierroise	Moirans-en-Montagne
16:00 CET		Report	Fontaine 19'	Stadium: Stade Municipal; Attendance: 523; Referee: Floris Aubis

=== Mainland ties ===
The mainland ties were drawn in ten groups, with two Ligue 2 teams in each group. The rest of the teams in each group were selected to give an even distribution of teams from different tiers, and the best possible geographical fit.

The lowest ranked team remaining in the competition at this stage was Verton FC from tier 9 (District division 1).

Ties were played on 15, 16 and 17 November 2019, with postponements rearranged for 19, 23 and 24 November 2019.

==== Group 7A ====
17 November 2019	US Gravelines (6)	2–3 (a.e.t.)	FC Rouen (4)	Gravelines
14:00 CET	Joveta 31'; Vereecque 38' (pen.)	Report	Sainte-Luce 30'; Sahloune 90+3'; Diop 100'	Stadium: Stade des Huttes; Attendance: 674; Referee: Mohomed Akbar

16 November 2019	ESM Gonfreville (5)	1–0	Le Touquet AC (5)	Gonfreville-l'Orcher
18:00 CET	Thioubou 56'	Report		Stadium: Stade Maurice Baquet; Attendance: 280; Referee: Marc Michout

17 November 2019	Verton FC (9)	0–3	Stade Portelois (5)	Le Touquet
14:00 CET		Report	Delpierre 65'; Lerat 81'; Flahaut 88'	Stadium: Complexe Sportif; Attendance: 2,000; Referee: Geoffrey Kubler

17 November 2019	Olympique Lumbrois (7)	3–3 (a.e.t.) (2–4 p)	Olympique Grande-Synthe (5)	Lumbres
14:00 CET	Caron 12'; Ferlin 87'; Rufin 119'	Report	Niang 23'; Cosyn 34'; Mlowa 98'	Stadium: Stade Jean Lebas; Referee: Gaétan Korbas

15 November 2019	Le Havre (2)	1–3	USL Dunkerque (3)	Le Havre
20:00 CET	Basque 37'	Report	Goteni 27'; Bayo 66', 83'	Stadium: Stade Océane; Attendance: 1,938; Referee: Aurélien Petit

16 November 2019	Lens (2)	3–1 (a.e.t.)	US Boulogne (3)	Lens
17:00 CET	Perez 54'; Keita 108', 110'	Report	Idazza 76'	Stadium: Stade Bollaert-Delelis; Attendance: 9,007; Referee: Bastien Dechepy

17 November 2019	US Saint-Omer (6)	0–1	FC Dieppe (5)	Saint-Omer
14:00 CET		Report	Garnier 45+3'	Stadium: Stade Gaston Bonnet; Attendance: 800; Referee: Renaud Potier

17 November 2019	US Tourcoing FC (6)	5–0	Grand Calais Pascal FC (7)	Tourcoing
14:00 CET	De Araujo 38', 72'; Petit 64'; Lounas 72'; Halipre 87'	Report		Stadium: Stade Charles Van de Veegaete; Attendance: 800; Referee: Ludovic Genest

==== Group 7B ====
17 November 2019	US Pont Sainte-Maxence (7)	1–2	USM Senlisienne (6)	Pont-Sainte-Maxence
14:00 CET	Ganga 21'	Report	Kaba 41'; Gonzalez 90+1'	Stadium: Stade Georges Decroze; Attendance: 400; Referee: Médéric Lacour

16 November 2019	AC Cambrai (6)	0–1	US Quevilly-Rouen (3)	Cambrai
18:00 CET		Report	Pianelli 59'	Stadium: Stade de la Liberté; Attendance: 906; Referee: Anthony Ustaritz

17 November 2019	Olympique Marcquois Football (5)	0–1	Iris Club de Croix (4)	Marcq-en-Barœul
15:00 CET		Report	Christiaens 59'	Stadium: Stade Georges Niquet; Attendance: 1,186; Referee: Félicien Gazon

16 November 2019	AS Beauvais Oise (5)	1–4	Chambly (2)	Beauvais
20:00 CET	Traoré 60'	Report	Tallo 15' (pen.); Santelli 44'; Beaulieu 45'; Guezoui 53'	Stadium: Stade Pierre Brisson; Attendance: 2,000; Referee: Thierry Bouille

16 November 2019	US Nœux-les-Mines (6)	0–2	FC Bastia-Borgo (3)	Nœux-les-Mines
14:00 CET		Report	Cropanese 50'; Odzoumo 77'	Stadium: Stade Camille Tisserand; Attendance: 1,663; Referee: Lakhdar El Bedoui

17 November 2019	Olympique Adamois (7)	2–3 (a.e.t.)	Olympique Saint-Quentin (4)	L'Isle-Adam
14:00 CET	Ruberecht 41'; Sakho 112'	Report	Modeste 88'; Sylla 100'; Gaye 115'	Stadium: Stade Philippe Grant; Attendance: 254; Referee: Paul Garo

17 November 2019	AS Prix-lès-Mézières (5)	2–0	Wasquehal Football (6)	Prix-lès-Mézières
14:00 CET	Thioune 3'; Houtlot 85'	Report		Stadium: Stade de la Poterie; Attendance: 500; Referee: Romain Zamo

17 November 2019	US Saint-Maximin (7)	0–2	Valenciennes (2)	Vineuil-Saint-Firmin
14:00 CET		Report	Chevalier 60'; Boutoutaou 80'	Stadium: Stade des Bourgognes; Attendance: 500; Referee: Pierre Legat

==== Group 7C ====
17 November 2019	US Mozac (8)	2–3	FC Cournon-d'Auvergne (7)	Mozac
14:00 CET	Lelion 8'; Ducrotoy 29'	Report	Guittard 46'; Berot 56', 67' (pen.)	Stadium: Complexe Sportif Edmond Vacant; Attendance: 1,200; Referee: Bastien Leray

16 November 2019	Auch Football (5)	0–5	Rodez (2)	Auch
14:00 CET		Report	Caddy 27', 34'; Ouhafsa 37', 62'; Mathis 88'	Stadium: Complexe Sportif Éric Carrière; Attendance: 2,000; Referee: Gaël Angoula

17 November 2019	L'Union Saint-Jean FC (6)	0–1	Aviron Bayonnais FC (5)	L'Union
14:00 CET		Report	Dos Santos 74' (pen.)	Stadium: Stade Georges Beney; Attendance: 400; Referee: Rémy Rasclard

16 November 2019	FC Alberes Argelès (6)	0–1	Pau FC (3)	Argelès-sur-Mer
18:00 CET		Report	Sabaly 7'	Stadium: Stade Éric Cantona; Attendance: 637; Referee: Aldric Chancioux

16 November 2019	Trélissac FC (4)	2–0	Stade Montois (5)	Trélissac
18:00 CET	Fourmy 8' (pen.); Diaby 90+2'	Report		Stadium: Stade Firmin Daudou; Attendance: 368; Referee: Julien Rouquette

19 November 2019 (Note: Match originally scheduled for 17 November 2019, but was postponed due to closure of municipal pitches by the weather.)	Toulouse Rodéo FC (5)	0–1	US Colomiers Football (4)	Toulouse
20:00 CET		Report	Temmar 45+2'	Stadium: Stade Robert Barran; Attendance: 250; Referee: Mathieu Vernice

16 November 2019	Bergerac Périgord FC (4)	1–0	Clermont (2)	Bergerac
14:30 CET	Fichten 18'	Report		Stadium: Stade de Campréal; Attendance: 1,200; Referee: Ahmed Taleb

16 November 2019	FC Marssac-Rivières-Senouillac Rives du Tarn (6)	2–1	FC Saint-Médard-en-Jalles (6)	Marssac-sur-Tarn
19:00 CET	Lacourt 78'; Michel 83'	Report	Julisson 14'	Stadium: Stade Désiré Gach; Attendance: 400; Referee: Tawbane Kani

==== Group 7D ====
17 November 2019	US Saint-Galmier-Chambœuf (8)	0–0 (a.e.t.) (2–3 p)	Côte Chaude Sportif (7)	Saint-Galmier
14:00 CET		Report		Stadium: Stade Benoît Rolles; Referee: Julien Schmitt

16 November 2019	Olympique Alès (5)	1–0	AS Lattoise (6)	Alès
19:00 CET	Briancon 53'	Report		Stadium: Stade Pierre Pibarot; Attendance: 150; Referee: Louis Lungeri

16 November 2019	US Saint-Flour (5)	3–1	Ajaccio (2)	Saint-Flour
14:00 CET	Coutarel 10'; Jusserandot 62'; Raoul 90+4'	Report	Cavalli 20'	Stadium: Stade René Jarlier; Attendance: 2,500; Referee: Cédric Dos Santos

16 November 2019	RC Grasse (4)	2–0	US Marseille Endoume (4)	Grasse
18:00 CET	Ako 54'; Artheron 58'	Report		Stadium: Stade de la Paoute; Attendance: 556; Referee: William Toulliou

16 November 2019	AS Fabrègues (5)	3–1 (a.e.t.)	RCO Agde (5)	Fabrègues
14:00 CET	Derrar 40'; Yagousseti 97'; Ouabi 103'	Report	Pron 24'	Stadium: Stade Joseph Jeanton; Attendance: 339; Referee: Yann Gazagnes

16 November 2019	Étoile Fréjus Saint-Raphaël (4)	2–1	Grenoble (2)	Saint-Raphaël
17:00 CET	Tlili 22', 48'	Report	Bénet 54' (pen.)	Stadium: Stade Louis Hon; Attendance: 593; Referee: Jeremy Stinat

16 November 2019	EUGA Ardziv (5)	0–1	Le Puy Foot 43 Auvergne (3)	Marseille
15:00 CET		Report	Clément 78'	Stadium: Stade Sévan; Attendance: 441; Referee: Julien Reynet

16 November 2019	FC Lyon (7)	0–1	Athlético Marseille (5)	Lyon
18:00 CET		Report	Bâ 36'	Stadium: Stade Georges Vuillermet; Attendance: 756; Referee: Robin Chapapria

==== Group 7E ====
16 November 2019	RC Lons-le-Saunier (6)	1–2	Annecy FC (4)	Lons-le-Saunier
18:00 CET	Rachedi 56'	Report	Kadi 35'; Rocchi 46'	Stadium: Stade Municipal; Attendance: 965; Referee: Ali Djedid

15 November 2019	Football Bourg-en-Bresse Péronnas 01 (3)	1–0	Troyes (2)	Bourg-en-Bresse (Note: Tie reversed from original draw due to Stade de l'Aube being closed due to structural issues.)
20:00 CET	Anani 45'	Report		Stadium: Stade Marcel-Verchère; Attendance: 1,021; Referee: Mehdi Mokhtari

19 November 2019 (Note: Match originally scheduled for 15 November 2019, but was postponed due to snow.)	FC Bourgoin-Jallieu (5)	0–2	FC Villefranche (3)	Bourgoin-Jallieu
20:00 CET		Report	Dadoune 19'; Sergio 60' (pen.)	Stadium: Stade Pierre Rajon; Attendance: 602; Referee: Joachim Pierson

24 November 2019 (Note: Match originally scheduled for 17 November 2019, but was postponed due to the weather conditions forcing a closure of municipal pitches.)	Olympique de Valence (6)	3–1	Thonon Évian FC (6)	Valence
14:00 CET	Merabet 42'; Benhmida 53'; Cettier 90+3'	Report	Chaibi 12'	Stadium: Stade Georges Pompidou; Attendance: 1,400; Referee: Guillaume Janin

16 November 2019	ES Chilly (7)	1–0	Hauts Lyonnais (5)	Rumilly
18:00 CET	Roulier 57'	Report		Stadium: Stade des Grangettes; Attendance: 1,185; Referee: Maxime Apruzzese

17 November 2019	US Annecy-le-Vieux (7)	0–4	FC Limonest Saint-Didier (5)	Annecy-le-Vieux
14:00 CET		Report	Simon 45', 75', 79', 90'	Stadium: Complex Sportif d'Albigny; Attendance: 400; Referee: Gaetan Martin

17 November 2019	FC 4 Rivières 70 (6)	3–1	Chassieu Décines FC (6)	Dampierre-sur-Salon
14:00 CET	Linotte 47'; Dupoisot 71'; Barthelet 81'	Report	Boulanger 36' (o.g.)	Stadium: Stade Municipal; Attendance: 500; Referee: Guy Prevot

16 November 2019	US La Charité (6)	0–4	Auxerre (2)	Varennes-Vauzelles
14:00 CET		Report	Merdji 3'; Sorgić 40'; Ngando 54'; Ji 90'	Stadium: Stade des Senets; Attendance: 2,500; Referee: Mickaël Leleu

==== Group 7F ====
17 November 2019	Nancy (2)	2–1	AS Belfort Sud (6)	Nancy (Note: Tie reversed from original draw, due to AS Belfort Sud not being able to provide a suitable ground.)
14:00 CET	Dona Ndoh 19'; Seka 90+7'	Report	Saoudi 27' (pen.)	Stadium: Stade Marcel Picot; Attendance: 400; Referee: Faouzi Benchabane

17 November 2019	AS Erstein (6)	0–2	ES Thaon (5)	Erstein
15:00 CET		Report	Ulrich 7'; Comara 89'	Stadium: Stade Municipal; Attendance: 150; Referee: Cyril Dell Angela

17 November 2019	US Oberschaeffolsheim (8)	1–3	US Raon-l'Étape (5)	Geispolsheim
15:00 CET	Koerin 74'	Report	Merbah 5'; Omombé 67'; Hassidou 85' (pen.)	Stadium: Stade Municipal; Attendance: 500; Referee: Loïc L'Henoret

17 November 2019	US Vandœuvre (6)	2–0	FC Lunéville (6)	Vandœuvre-lès-Nancy
14:00 CET	el Guerrab 41', 45' (pen.)	Report		Stadium: Stade Jacques Sonet; Attendance: 850; Referee: Clément Visbecq

16 November 2019	FC Montceau Bourgogne (5)	4–2 (a.e.t.)	FC Geispolsheim 01 (6)	Montceau-les-Mines
18:00 CET	Rougeot 51', 120'; Gauthier Moreau 77'; De Oliveira Maia 113'	Report	Bagnon 41' (o.g.); Comtesse 79'	Stadium: Stade des Alouettes; Attendance: 480; Referee: Raphaël Roumy

16 November 2019	ASM Belfort (4)	1–0	Gazélec Ajaccio (3)	Belfort
14:00 CET	Régnier 71'	Report		Stadium: Stade Roger Serzian; Attendance: 527; Referee: Pierre Gaillouste

17 November 2019	AS Sundhoffen (7)	0–3	FC Mulhouse (4)	Sundhoffen
14:00 CET		Report	Olávio Gomes 11'; Taqtak 17'; Kecha 47'	Stadium: Stade Raymond Bollinger; Attendance: 827; Referee: Emmanuel Caron

16 November 2019	SAS Épinal (4)	2–0	Sochaux (2)	Épinal
15:00 CET	Biron 27'; Kubota 82'	Report		Stadium: Stade de la Colombière; Attendance: 2,000; Referee: Abdelatif Kherradji

==== Group 7G ====
23 November 2019 (Note: Match originally scheduled for 16 November 2019, but was postponed due to a waterlogged pitch.)	Sainte-Geneviève Sports (4)	0–1	L'Entente SSG (4)	Sainte-Geneviève-des-Bois
18:00 CET		Report	Diedhiou 3'	Stadium: Parc des Sports Léo Lagrange; Attendance: 282; Referee: Azzedine Souifi

17 November 2019	SSEP Hombourg-Haut (8)	1–0	US Forbach (6)	Hombourg-Haut
14:00 CET	M'Barki 82'	Report		Stadium: Stade Omnisports; Attendance: 1,500; Referee: Thomas Depierreux

17 November 2019	CA Boulay (6)	2–1	CS Meaux (6)	Boulay-Moselle
14:00 CET	Chirre 75'; Stuber 90'	Report	Camara 17'	Stadium: Stade Charles Muller; Attendance: 800; Referee: Adrien Duperrier Simond

16 November 2019	Villemomble Sports (7)	1–5	Orléans (2)	Villemomble
19:00 CET	Adnaouene 65'	Report	Correa 24'; Marchadier 55'; Scheidler 69', 76' (pen.); Talal 87'	Stadium: Stade Georges Pompidou; Attendance: 711; Referee: Marc Bollengier

16 November 2019	Moulins Yzeure Foot (4)	1–2	Saint-Pryvé Saint-Hilaire FC (4)	Yzeure
18:00 CET	Deniaud 84' (pen.)	Report	Antoine 22', 35'	Stadium: Stade de Bellevue; Attendance: 762; Referee: Valentin Ougier

17 November 2019	EF Reims Ste Anne Châtillons (6)	0–0 (a.e.t.) (5–4 p)	MJEP Cormontreuil (6)	Cormontreuil
14:00 CET		Report		Stadium: Stade Robert Pirès; Attendance: 250; Referee: Valentin Giorgetti

16 November 2019	US Sarre-Union (5)	0–2	US Créteil-Lusitanos (3)	Sarre-Union
17:00 CET		Report	Habbas 28'; Fábio Pereira 80'	Stadium: Stade Omnisports; Attendance: 492; Referee: Antoine Valnet

16 November 2019	CSO Amnéville (5)	0–2	Paris FC (2)	Amnéville
17:00 CET		Report	Mara 17'; Diaby-Fadiga 74'	Stadium: Stade Andre Valentin; Attendance: 1,000; Referee: Matthieu Bonnetin

==== Group 7H ====
23 November 2019 (Note: Match originally scheduled for 16 November 2019, but was postponed due to a waterlogged pitch.)	Dinan-Léhon FC (5)	0–1	Stade Pontivyen (5)	Léhon
18:00 CET		Report	Le Sauce 69'	Stadium: Stade Le Clos Gastel; Attendance: 1,400; Referee: Kevin Barbin

17 November 2019	CEP Lorient (6)	1–3	Stade Plabennécois (5)	Lorient
14:00 CET	Derennes 25'	Report	Fekir 60', 83'; Coat 62'	Stadium: Stade de Kervénanec; Attendance: 500; Referee: Léo Beulet

16 November 2019	Lorient (2)	3–0	Guingamp (2)	Lorient
17:30 CET	Bozok 6'; Laurienté 50'; Kerbrat 82' (o.g.)	Report		Stadium: Stade du Moustoir; Attendance: 7,660; Referee: Bartolomeu Varela

16 November 2019	Voltigeurs de Châteaubriant (5)	4–0	TA Rennes (5)	Châteaubriant
18:00 CET	Vernet 57'; Leye 76'; Danso 81'; Bangoura 90+2'	Report		Stadium: Stade de la Ville en Bois; Attendance: 1,185; Referee: Guilliaume Bousquet

17 November 2019	FC Guichen (5)	2–1 (a.e.t.)	Saint-Pierre Milizac (6)	Guichen
14:00 CET	Rousseau 74', 108'	Report	Kerzil 45'	Stadium: Stade Charles Gautier; Attendance: 500; Referee: Lyes Boukeroui

16 November 2019	CS Betton (8)	0–6	US Concarneau (3)	Cesson-Sévigné
18:00 CET		Report	Ebrard 26', 33' (pen.); Moina 62', 63'; Benali 79', 84'	Stadium: Stade Roger Belliard; Attendance: 1,571; Referee: Jordan Riche

16 November 2019	US Montagnarde (6)	1–2 (a.e.t.)	Stade Briochin (4)	Inzinzac-Lochrist
18:00 CET	Barry 32'	Report	N'Diaye 47'; Le Méhauté 93'	Stadium: Stade Mané Braz; Attendance: 634; Referee: Samir Zolota

17 November 2019	SC Le Rheu (6)	4–3 (a.e.t.)	Stade Paimpolais FC (7)	Le Rheu
14:00 CET	Ricavy 43'; L'Honore 59'; Ambassa 107'; Lardoux 118'	Report	Callac 56', 77'; Guyomard 119'	Stadium: Stade du Cosec; Attendance: 800; Referee: Steven Llewellyn

==== Group 7I ====
16 November 2019	US Granville (4)	2–0	AG Caennaise (5)	Granville
18:00 CET	Blondel 22'; Ibayi 88'	Report		Stadium: Stade Louis Dior; Attendance: 1,000; Referee: Philippe Lucas

16 November 2019	La Flèche RC (5)	2–3	ESA Linas-Montlhéry (6)	La Flèche
18:00 CET	Bouanga 6', 78'	Report	Duval 15'; Kanouté 29'; Leno 85'	Stadium: Stade Montréal; Attendance: 500; Referee: Garry Cambon

16 November 2019	Ancienne Château-Gontier (6)	0–1	C'Chartres Football (4)	Château-Gontier
18:00 CET		Report	Archimbaud 90+1'	Stadium: Stade du Pavé; Attendance: 1,250; Referee: Nicolas Wassouf

16 November 2019	Bourges Foot (4)	1–1 (a.e.t.) (3–5 p)	Sablé FC (5)	Bourges
19:00 CET	Mboup 28'	Report	Sylla 45+1' (o.g.)	Stadium: Stade Jacques Rimbault; Attendance: 361; Referee: Romain Perpinan

16 November 2019	ASI Mûrs-Erigné (7)	0–6	Caen (2)	Angers
18:00 CET		Report	Vandermersch 8'; Gioacchini 11'; Pi 18' (pen.); Rivierez 68'; Armougom 83'; Diaw 86'	Stadium: Stade Raymond Kopa; Attendance: 4,065; Referee: Romain Lissourgue

17 November 2019	ES Nanterre (7)	2–0	Stade Lavallois (3)	Nanterre
14:00 CET	Sylla 36', 88'	Report		Stadium: Stade Gabriel Péri; Attendance: 991; Referee: Brendan Roffet

23 November 2019 (Note: Match originally scheduled for 16 November 2019, but was postponed due to the weather conditions forcing a closure of municipal pitches.)	AS Montlouis-sur-Loire (5)	1–2	AF Virois (5)	Montlouis-sur-Loire
18:00 CET	Ferron 17' (o.g.)	Report	Dallois 59'; Boucaud 90+2'	Stadium: Stade Eugène Cholet; Attendance: 800; Referee: Jacques Salze

16 November 2019	CSM Gennevilliers (7)	0–2	Le Mans (2)	Colombes
14:00 CET		Report	Hafidi 40'; Julienne 56'	Stadium: Stade Olympique Yves-du-Manoir; Attendance: 3,000; Referee: Eddy Rosier

==== Group 7J ====
16 November 2019	Châteauroux (2)	1–1 (a.e.t.) (6–7 p)	Niort (2)	Châteauroux
15:00 CET	Grange 36' (pen.)	Report	Baroan 14'	Stadium: Stade Gaston Petit; Attendance: 1,500; Referee: Benjamin Lepaysant

16 November 2019	FC Challans (5)	3–0	Vendée Poiré-sur-Vie Football (6)	Challans
18:00 CET	Letapissier 18'; Chebbi 43'; N'Guessan 73'	Report		Stadium: Stade Jean Léveillé; Attendance: 1,200; Referee: Cédric Mouysset

16 November 2019	JS Sireuil (7)	1–7	Les Herbiers VF (4)	Sireuil
19:00 CET	Chaoua 25'	Report	Assoumin 13'; Héry 21'; Pouye 31', 68', 83'; Dutard 40'; Schuster 58'	Stadium: Stade Gérard Pivetaud; Attendance: 586; Referee: Loic Mouton

16 November 2019	US La Baule-Le Pouliguen (7)	0–1	Angoulême-Soyaux Charente (4)	La Baule-Escoublac
18:00 CET		Report	Moke 81'	Stadium: Stade Moreau Defarges; Attendance: 656; Referee: Damien Rossini

17 November 2019	OL Saint-Liguaire Niort (6)	1–3	Vendée Fontenay Foot (5)	Niort
14:00 CET	Camara 90'	Report	Godet 11'; Diawara 35'; Garot 78'	Stadium: Stade de Saint Liguaire; Referee: Gauthier Lapalu

17 November 2019	Stade Poitevin FC (5)	5–0	FC Nueillaubiers (6)	Buxerolles
14:00 CET	Choubani 7'; Jean-Etienne 26'; Cuvier 34', 42'; Cambrone 67'	Report		Stadium: Complexe Sportif Michel Amand; Referee: Pierre Retail

16 November 2019	Tours FC (5)	2–0	FC Chauray (6)	Tours
17:00 CET	Camara 6', 19'	Report		Stadium: Stade de la Vallée du Cher; Attendance: 652; Referee: Gaëtan Deneuve

16 November 2019	Avenir Theix (7)	2–3	Red Star FC (3)	Theix-Noyalo
16:30 CET	Jaffrès 54', 84'	Report	N'Zuzi Mata 21', 76'; Arab 41'	Stadium: Complexe Sportif Brestivan; Attendance: 1,337; Referee: Emmanuel Esneu

== Eighth round ==
The draw for the eighth round took place in two parts:

- Ties involving overseas teams playing at home (Jeunesse Evolution of Guadeloupe and JS Saint-Pierroise of Réunion) were drawn on 19 November 2019.
- Ties involving teams from mainland France and the remaining teams from Martinique and French Guiana were drawn on 20 November 2019.

All ties took place on the weekend of 7 and 8 December 2019.

=== Overseas ties ===
Ties were played on 7 and 8 December 2019.

7 December 2019	AN Jeunesse Évolution (Guadeloupe)	0–2	ASM Belfort (4)	Les Abymes, Guadeloupe
18:00 ECT		Report	Ranneaud 63'; Régnier 87'	Stadium: Stade René Serge Nabajoth; Attendance: 1,500; Referee: Gaël Angoula

8 December 2019	JS Saint-Pierroise (Réunion)	1–1 (a.e.t.) (5–3 p)	ES Thaon (5)	Saint-Pierre, Réunion
15:30 UTC−10:00	Souéfou 40'	Report	Comara 90+1' (pen.)	Stadium: Stade Michel Volnay; Attendance: 7,000; Referee: Remi Landry

=== Main draw ties ===
The main draw ties were drawn in six groups, with the teams in each group selected to give an even distribution of teams from different tiers, and the best possible geographical fit.

The lowest ranked team remaining in the competition at this stage was SSEP Hombourg-Haut from tier 8 (Regional division 3).

Ties were played on 7 and 8 December 2019.

==== Group 8A ====
7 December 2019	US Vandœuvre (6)	2–3 (a.e.t.)	Red Star (3)	Vandœuvre-lès-Nancy
13:30 CET	Rolland 13'; Konowrocki 63'	Report	Roye 4'; Koita 23'; Verdier 112'	Stadium: Stade Jacques Sonet; Attendance: 2,000; Referee: Joachim Pierson

8 December 2019	ASPV Strasbourg (5)	1–3	Nancy (2)	Strasbourg
15:00 CET	Kahla 90'	Report	Dona Ndoh 35'; Bassi 36'; N'Guessan 87'	Stadium: Stadium Emile-Stahl; Attendance: 1,500; Referee: Alexandre Perreau Niel

7 December 2019	US Raon-l'Étape (5)	6–2	CA Boulay (6)	Raon-l'Étape
16:30 CET	Bah 6'; Géhin 9'; Merbah 34'; Duminy 35'; Hassidou 54'; Omombé 69'	Report	Chirre 21'; Garofalo 72'	Stadium: Stade Paul Gasser; Attendance: 1,098; Referee: Valentin Ougier

7 December 2019	SSEP Hombourg-Haut (8)	2–1	Auxerre (2)	Sarreguemines
15:00 CET	M'Barki 7'; Benichou 76'	Report	Le Bihan 58'	Stadium: Stade de la Blies; Attendance: 3,000; Referee: Marc Bollengier

7 December 2019	FC Mulhouse (4)	2–3	SAS Épinal (4)	Mulhouse
17:00 CET	Soumah 21', 71'	Report	Krasso 5'; Makengo 9'; Biron 45'	Stadium: Stade de l'Ill; Attendance: 480; Referee: Tawbane Kani

7 December 2019	FC 4 Rivières 70 (6)	0–2	Football Bourg-en-Bresse Péronnas 01 (3)	Dampierre-sur-Salon
13:30 CET		Report	Nirlo 42'; Anani 47'	Stadium: Stade Municipal; Attendance: 1,155; Referee: Ali Djedid

7 December 2019	FC Montceau Bourgogne (5)	3–0	Racing Besançon (5)	Montceau-les-Mines
18:00 CET	Renoud 36' de Oliveira 73'; Brelier 90+2'	Report		Stadium: Stade des Alouettes; Attendance: 542; Referee: Damien Rossini

==== Group 8B ====
7 December 2019	Étoile Fréjus Saint-Raphaël (4)	1–1 (a.e.t.) (5–3 p)	Olympique Alès (5)	Saint-Raphaël
18:30 CET	Da Silva 30'	Report	Laffaille 72'	Stadium: Stade Louis Hon; Attendance: 480; Referee: Cédric Mouysset

7 December 2019	FC Limonest Saint-Didier (5)	2–1 (a.e.t.)	FC Villefranche (3)	Limonest
18:00 CET	Rouvière 98', 112'	Report	Renaut 111'	Stadium: Parc des Sports Courtois Fillot; Attendance: 732; Referee: Louis Lungeri

7 December 2019	RC Grasse (4)	1–2	Athlético Marseille (5)	Grasse
18:00 CET	Saffour 76'	Report	Nagui 2'; Nehari 54'	Stadium: Stade de la Paoute; Attendance: 536; Referee: Gaetan Martin

7 December 2019	ES Chilly (7)	0–1 (a.e.t.)	AS Fabrègues (5)	Rumilly
17:00 CET		Report	Yagousseti 94'	Stadium: Stade des Grangettes; Attendance: 2,124; Referee: Geoffrey Kubler

7 December 2019	Côte Chaude Sportif (7)	0–1	Le Puy Foot 43 Auvergne (3)	Saint-Étienne
13:30 CET		Report	Fleury 7'	Stadium: Complexe Sportif Michon; Attendance: 763; Referee: Maxime Apruzzese

8 December 2019	Olympique de Valence (6)	0–1 (a.e.t.)	Paris FC (2)	Valence
14:00 CET		Report	Martin 98'	Stadium: Stade Georges Pompidou; Attendance: 3,062; Referee: Julien Schmitt

7 December 2019	Annecy FC (4)	1–2	Chambly (2)	Annecy
14:00 CET	Le Tallec 65' (pen.)	Report	Eickmayer 55'; Jaques 69' (pen.)	Stadium: Parc des Sports; Attendance: 2,050; Referee: Nicolas Rainville

==== Group 8C ====
7 December 2019	Angoulême-Soyaux Charente (4)	5–1	US Saint-Flour (5)	Angoulême
18:00 CET	Alouache 26', 35'; Lacroix 52'; Gonçalves 65'; Mondziaou Zinga 80'	Report	Mieze 89'	Stadium: Stade Lebon; Attendance: 537; Referee: Alexis Brouard

7 December 2019	Bergerac Périgord FC (4)	0–0 (a.e.t.) (6–7 p)	Trélissac FC (4)	Bergerac
18:00 CET		Report		Stadium: Stade de Campréal; Attendance: 1,065; Referee: Guilliaume Janin

7 December 2019	Stade Poitevin FC (5)	1–3	Rodez (2)	Buxerolles
17:00 CET	Neto 18'	Report	Caddy 46', 53'; Douline 74'	Stadium: Stade Michel Amand; Attendance: 2,500; Referee: Samir Zolota

7 December 2019	Aviron Bayonnais FC (5)	4–1	Vendée Fontenay Foot (5)	Bayonne
18:00 CET	Escarpit 6', 55'; Laplace-Palette 68'; Hirigoyen 85'	Report	Tangatchy 25'	Stadium: Stade Didier Deschamps; Attendance: 272; Referee: Julie Reynet

7 December 2019	FC Marssac-Rivières-Senouillac Rives du Tarn (6)	1–4	Pau FC (3)	Albi
19:00 CET	Lacourt 50'	Report	Ba 7'; Sabaly 26'; Gueye 30'; Bayard 81'	Stadium: Stade Maurice Rigaud; Attendance: 1,839; Referee: Kevin Barbin

7 December 2019	FC Challans (5)	1–1 (a.e.t.) (3–1 p)	US Colomiers Football (4)	Challans
18:00 CET	Quarshie 55'	Report	Cardinali 4'	Stadium: Stade Jean Léveillé; Attendance: 1,000; Referee: Paul Garo

7 December 2019	FC Cournon-d'Auvergne (7)	0–2	Niort (2)	Cournon-d'Auvergne
15:00 CET		Report	Koné 20', 59'	Stadium: Stade Joseph et Michel Gardet; Attendance: 1,000; Referee: Yann Gazagnes

==== Group 8D ====
8 December 2019	Les Herbiers VF (4)	1–2 (a.e.t.)	Le Mans (2)	Les Herbiers
15:00 CET	Schuster 36' (pen.)	Report	Créhin 26' (pen.); Manzala 107' (pen.)	Stadium: Stade Massabielle; Attendance: 2,419; Referee: Benjamin Lepaysant

7 December 2019	Tours FC (5)	2–1 (a.e.t.)	(Martinique) Club Franciscain	Tours
15:00 CET	Dugain 53'; Jaki 113'	Report	Thimon 9'	Stadium: Stade de la Vallée du Cher; Attendance: 1,925; Referee: Marc Michout

7 December 2019	Sablé FC (5)	2–0	US Concarneau (3)	Sablé-sur-Sarthe
18:00 CET	Naïs 34', 70'	Report		Stadium: Stade Rémy Lambert; Attendance: 889; Referee: Yohan Gagnant

7 December 2019	Voltigeurs de Châteaubriant (5)	0–0 (a.e.t.) (5–6 p)	Stade Briochin (4)	Châteaubriant
18:00 CET		Report		Stadium: Stade de la Ville en Bois; Attendance: 1,567; Referee: Lyes Boukeroui

7 December 2019	FC Guichen (5)	2–1	SC Le Rheu (6)	Guichen
16:00 CET	Michel 9'; Huet 90+3'	Report	Grabowski 73' (o.g.)	Stadium: Stade Charles Gautier; Attendance: 1,603; Referee: Guillaume Bousquet

7 December 2019	Stade Plabennécois (5)	0–2	US Granville (4)	Plabennec
18:00 CET		Report	Akueson 40'; Mouaddib 55'	Stadium: Stade de Kervéguen; Attendance: 720; Referee: Jordan Riche

7 December 2019	Stade Pontivyen (5)	0–1	Lorient (2)	Pontivy
14:15 CET		Report	Bozok 50'	Stadium: Stade du Faubourg de Verdun; Attendance: 2,936; Referee: Cédric Dos Santos

==== Group 8E ====
7 December 2019	FC Rouen (4)	1–0	Orléans (2)	Le Petit-Quevilly
18:00 CET	Rogie 84' (pen.)	Report		Stadium: Stade Robert Diochon; Attendance: 5,000; Referee: Thierry Bouille

8 December 2019	ESA Linas-Montlhéry (6)	3–1	Évreux FC 27 (5)	Montlhéry
13:30 CET	Kanouté 49'; Cissé 51', 57'	Report	Diallo 42' (o.g.)	Stadium: Stade Paul Desgouillons; Attendance: 726; Referee: Valentin Giorgetti

8 December 2019	AF Virois (5)	0–3	FC Versailles 78 (5)	Vire
14:30 CET		Report	Akassou 7', 25', 67'	Stadium: Stade Pierre Compte; Attendance: 1,186; Referee: Loic Mouton

7 December 2019	Saint-Pryvé Saint-Hilaire FC (4)	6–0	(French Guiana) AJ Saint-Georges	Saint-Pryvé-Saint-Mesmin
15:00 CET	Kimbembe 20', 50'; Lemaitre 42'; Antoine 46', 66', 89'	Report		Stadium: Stade du Grand Clos; Attendance: 378; Referee: Emmanuel Esneu

7 December 2019	ESM Gonfreville (5)	5–2 (a.e.t.)	US Créteil-Lusitanos (3)	Gonfreville-l'Orcher
18:00 CET	Mendy 7', 112', 116'; Diallo 97'; Thioubou 119'	Report	Bouhmidi 9', 111'	Stadium: Stade Maurice Baquet; Attendance: 566; Referee: Emmanuel Caron

7 December 2019	C'Chartres Football (4)	0–1	Caen (2)	Chartres
14:15 CET		Report	Gonçalves 26'	Stadium: Stade Jacques-Couvret; Attendance: 4,000; Referee: Philippe Lucas

8 December 2019	ES Nanterre (7)	1–2	FC Bastia-Borgo (3)	Nanterre
13:30 CET	Sylla 90+2'		Odzoumo 2'; Grimaldi 58' (pen.)	Stadium: Stade Gabriel Péri; Attendance: 1,896; Referee: Alexandre Mercier

==== Group 8F ====
8 December 2019	FC Dieppe (5)	2–1	Lens (2)	Saint-Aubin-sur-Scie
13:45 CET	Nkeng 3'; Henoc 7'	Report	Moukandjo 61'	Stadium: Stade Jean Dasnias; Attendance: 3,948; Referee: Romain Zamo

7 December 2019	AS Prix-lès-Mézières (5)	3–1	US Quevilly-Rouen (3)	Prix-lès-Mézières
13:30 CET	Lamine 45+1'; Hervé 85' (pen.); Thioune 89'	Report	Guel 72'	Stadium: Stade de la Poterie; Attendance: 900; Referee: Edgar Barenton

8 December 2019	US Tourcoing FC (6)	1–2	Valenciennes (2)	Tourcoing
15:00 CET	Fall 90+2'	Report	Guillaume 6'; Chevalier 13'	Stadium: Stade Van de Veegaete; Attendance: 946; Referee: Renaud Potier

8 December 2019	USM Senlisienne (6)	0–1	Stade Portelois (5)	Senlis
13:30 CET		Report	Spetebrot 53'	Stadium: Complexe Sportif; Attendance: 513; Referee: Gaétan Korbas

7 December 2019	Olympique Saint-Quentin (4)	1–3	Olympique Grande-Synthe (5)	Saint-Quentin
17:00 CET	Touré 71'	Report	Bellaredj 73'; Janeszko 86', 90+5'	Stadium: Stade Paul Debrésie; Attendance: 296; Referee: Cyril Dell Angela

8 December 2019	EF Reims Ste Anne Châtillons (6)	1–0	USL Dunkerque (3)	Cormontreuil
13:30 CET	Mansouri 85'	Report		Stadium: Stade Robert Pirès; Attendance: 950; Referee: Matthieu Bonnetin

7 December 2019	Iris Club de Croix (4)	0–1	L'Entente SSG (4)	Croix
18:00 CET		Report	Rodrigues Silva 74'	Stadium: Stade Henri Seigneur; Attendance: 604; Referee: Pierre Retail

== Round of 64 ==
The draw for the ninth round (known as the round of 64) took place on 9 December 2019. The 20 Ligue 1 teams joined the draw at this stage. The draw was split into four groups to ensure equal distribution of teams from each tier, with geographical proximity a secondary factor.

The lowest ranked team remaining in the competition at this stage was SSEP Hombourg-Haut from tier 8 (Regional League 3).

Games were played on 3, 4, 5 and 6 January 2020.

=== Group 9A ===
5 January 2020	Nice (1)	2–0	Étoile Fréjus Saint-Raphaël (4)	Nice
17:15 CET	Boudaoui 55'; Ounas 90+2'	Report		Stadium: Allianz Riviera; Attendance: 8,655; Referee: Nicolas Rainville

5 January 2020	FC Limonest Saint-Didier (5)	1–1 (a.e.t.) (3–1 p)	Le Puy Foot 43 Auvergne (3)	Limonest
17:15 CET	Canales 37'	Report	Fleury 59'	Stadium: Parc des Sports Courtois Fillot; Attendance: 1,500; Referee: Thomas Leonard
	Penalties
	Canales (penalty scored); Merabai (penalty scored); Tanard (penalty missed); Bouzit (penalty scored)		(penalty scored) Ouadoudi; (penalty missed) Ouaneh; (penalty missed) Fleury; (penalty missed) Sall

4 January 2020	Athlético Marseille (5)	2–1	Rodez (2)	Marseille
18:00 CET	Benbachir 8'; Meghezel 47'	Report	Maanane 53'	Stadium: Stade de la Martine; Attendance: 1,000; Referee: Cedric Dos Santos

4 January 2020	AS Fabrègues (5)	0–2	Paris FC (2)	Fabrègues
13:00 CET		Report	Armand 16'; Diaby 90+4'	Stadium: Stade Joseph Jeanton; Attendance: 2,500; Referee: Pierre Gaillouste

5 January 2020	FC Bastia-Borgo (3)	0–3	Saint-Étienne (1)	Furiani
14:15 CET		Report	Nordin 33', 90+3'; Fofana 45+1'	Stadium: Stade Armand Cesari; Attendance: 4,992; Referee: Karim Abed

5 January 2020	EF Reims Ste Anne Châtillons (6)	0–1	Montpellier (1)	Reims
14:15 CET		Report	Hilton 6'	Stadium: Stade Auguste-Delaune; Attendance: 3,824; Referee: Florent Batta

4 January 2020	ASM Belfort (4)	3–0	FC Montceau Bourgogne (5)	Belfort
18:00 CET	Bentahar 47'; Mukendi 86'; Saline 90+3'	Report		Stadium: Stade Roger Serzian; Attendance: 1,600; Referee: Aurélien Petit

4 January 2020	Monaco (1)	2–1	Reims (1)	Monaco
15:00 CET	Keita 61', 90+4'	Report	Dia 69'	Stadium: Stade Louis II; Attendance: 3,500; Referee: Willy Delajod

=== Group 9B ===
4 January 2020	Saint-Pryvé Saint-Hilaire FC (4)	1–0	Toulouse (1)	Saint-Pryvé-Saint-Mesmin
18:00 CET	Antoine 90+6'	Report		Stadium: Stade du Grand Clos; Attendance: 1,620; Referee: Antony Gautier

4 January 2020	Aviron Bayonnais FC (5)	0–2	Nantes (1)	Bayonne
13:00 CET		Report	Coulibaly 13'; Abeid 90+4'	Stadium: Stade Jean Dauger; Attendance: 8,000; Referee: Johan Hamel

5 January 2020	Trélissac FC (4)	1–1 (a.e.t.) (2–4 p)	Marseille (1)	Limoges
14:15 CET	Diaby 1'	Report	Payet 20'	Stadium: Stade Municipal de Beaublanc; Attendance: 13,200; Referee: Jérôme Brisard
	Penalties
	Bigné (penalty scored); Aguad (penalty scored); Diakhaby (penalty missed); Gnaleko (penalty missed)		(penalty scored) Payet; (penalty scored) Strootman; (penalty scored) Rongier; (penalty scored) Perrin

3 January 2020	Bordeaux (1)	2–0	Le Mans (2)	Bordeaux
20:55 CET	Briand 53' (pen.); Bašić 90+4'	Report		Stadium: Matmut Atlantique; Attendance: 5,436; Referee: François Letexier

4 January 2020	Niort (2)	1–2	(Réunion) JS Saint-Pierroise	Niort
13:00 CET	Randrianarisoa 63' (o.g.)	Report	Hubert 59'; Ponti 76'	Stadium: Stade René-Gaillard; Attendance: 2,000; Referee: Bartolomeu Varela

4 January 2020	Sablé FC (5)	2–2 (a.e.t.) (2–4 p)	Pau FC (3)	Sablé-sur-Sarthe
18:00 CET	Legendre 71'; Riclin 85' (pen.)	Report	Gueye 27'; Ba 40' (pen.)	Stadium: Stade Rémy Lambert; Attendance: 2,040; Referee: Romain Lissorgue
	Penalties
	Legendre (penalty missed); Thibault (penalty scored); Kabeya (penalty scored); Naïs (penalty missed)		? (penalty scored) ? (penalty scored) ? (penalty scored) ? (penalty scored)

4 January 2020	Angoulême-Soyaux Charente (4)	3–1	FC Challans (5)	Angoulême
18:00 CET	Moke Njedi 2'; Franco 61'; Zinga 90+3'	Report	Connan 41'	Stadium: Stade Lebon; Attendance: 2,500; Referee: Stéphanie Frappart

4 January 2020	Tours FC (5)	2–2 (a.e.t.) (2–4 p)	Nîmes (1)	Tours
15:00 CET	Da Silva 38'; Camara 64'	Report	Briançon 24'; Ripart 51' (pen.)	Stadium: Stade de la Vallée du Cher; Attendance: 3,510; Referee: Clément Turpin
	Penalties
	Mouangué (penalty scored); Dugain (penalty scored); Hidasse (penalty missed); Da Silva (penalty missed)		(penalty scored) Briançon; (penalty missed) Paquiez; (penalty scored) Stojanovski; (penalty scored) Denkey; (penalty scored) Valerio

=== Group 9C ===
5 January 2020	Olympique Grande-Synthe (5)	0–1	Nancy (2)	Dunkirk
17:15 CET		Report	Gueye 88'	Stadium: Stade Marcel-Tribut; Attendance: 1,168; Referee: Alexandre Perreau Niel

5 January 2020	SSEP Hombourg-Haut (8)	0–3	AS Prix-lès-Mézières (5)	Sarreguemines
17:15 CET		Report	Houlot 9'; Thioune 39'; Casado 90+3'	Stadium: Stade de la Blies; Attendance: 2,800; Referee: Mehdi Mokhtari

5 January 2020	L'Entente SSG (4)	0–1	SAS Épinal (4)	Saint-Gratien
17:15 CET		Report	Krasso 70'	Stadium: Stade Albert Talar; Attendance: 1,529; Referee: Sylvain Palhies

4 January 2020	Stade Portelois (5)	1–4	Strasbourg (1)	Calais
15:00 CET	Bultel 35'	Report	Corgnet 3'; Zohi 59', 65'; Lebeau 86' (pen.)	Stadium: Stade de l'Épopée; Attendance: 7,746; Referee: Benoît Millot

4 January 2020	Football Bourg-en-Bresse 01 (3)	0–7	Lyon (1)	Bourg-en-Bresse
20:55 CET		Report	Dembélé 17', 41'; Terrier 47'; Cornet 55'; Caqueret 82'; Aouar 89'; Cherki 90+1'	Stadium: Stade Marcel-Verchère; Attendance: 8,000; Referee: Hakim Ben El Hadj

5 January 2020	US Raon-l'Étape (5)	2–3	Lille (1)	Raon-l'Étape
14:15 CET	Duminy 77'; Hassidou 83' (pen.)	Report	Luiz Araújo 14'; Fonte 47'; Rémy 64'	Stadium: Stade Paul Gasser; Attendance: 3,779; Referee: Jérémie Pignard

5 January 2020	Valenciennes (2)	1–2	Dijon (1)	Valenciennes
17:15 CET	Chevalier 18' (pen.)	Report	Sammaritano 14'; Lautoa 74'	Stadium: Stade du Hainaut; Attendance: 3,421; Referee: Benoît Bastien

6 January 2020	FC Rouen (4)	3–0	Metz (1)	Le Petit-Quevilly
20:55 CET	Dembi 6'; Fataki 77'; Diarra 88'	Report		Stadium: Stade Robert Diochon; Attendance: 8,000; Referee: Gaël Angoula

=== Group 9D ===
4 January 2020	FC Versailles 78 (5)	1–2	Granville (4)	Versailles
13:00 CET	Louvet 14' (pen.)	Report	Lamrabette 21'; Mouaddib 71'	Stadium: Stade Montbauron; Attendance: 6,000; Referee: Thierry Bouillé

4 January 2020	Rennes (1)	0–0 (a.e.t.) (5–4 p)	Amiens (1)	Rennes
18:00 CET		Report		Stadium: Roazhon Park; Attendance: 13,525; Referee: Mikael Lesage
	Penalties
	Siebatcheu (penalty scored); Hunou (penalty scored); Gboho (penalty missed); Traoré (penalty missed); Del Castillo (penalty scored); Gnagnon (penalty scored); Da Silva (penalty scored)		(penalty scored) Chedjou; (penalty missed) Talal; (penalty scored) Ghoddos; (penalty scored) Aleesami; (penalty missed) Gnahoré; (penalty scored) Diabaté; (penalty missed) Dibassy

5 January 2020	Lorient (2)	2–1 (a.e.t.)	Brest (1)	Lorient
14:15 CET	Marveaux 22' (pen.); Wissa 112'	Report	Charbonnier 36'	Stadium: Stade du Moustoir; Attendance: 10,686; Referee: Eric Wattellier

4 January 2020	Red Star (3)	2–1	Chambly (2)	Saint-Ouen-sur-Seine
18:00 CET	Verdier 60'; Chahiri 75'	Report	David 10'	Stadium: Stade Bauer; Attendance: 2,500; Referee: Jérôme Miguelgorry

4 January 2020	FC Guichen (5)	1–2	Caen (2)	Rennes
13:00 CET	Manounou 78'	Report	Gioacchini 10'; Rivierez 26'	Stadium: Stade du Commandant Bougouin; Attendance: 3,000; Referee: Jérémy Stinat

5 January 2020	FC Dieppe (5)	1–3	Angers (1)	Dieppe
17:15 CET	Etame 86'	Report	Thomas 68'; Capelle 84', 90+4'	Stadium: Stade Jean Dasnias; Attendance: 4,457; Referee: Bastien Dechepy

5 January 2020	ESA Linas-Montlhéry (6)	0–6	Paris Saint-Germain (1)	Bondoufle
20:55 CET		Report	Aouchiche 30'; Cavani 40', 60'; Sarabia 63', 68'; Choupo-Moting 87'	Stadium: Stade Robert Bobin; Attendance: 14,987; Referee: Frank Schneider

4 January 2020	Stade Briochin (4)	1–1 (a.e.t.) (3–4 p)	ESM Gonfreville (5)	Saint-Brieuc
15:00 CET	Bloudeau 56' (pen.)	Report	Mendy 89'	Stadium: Stade Fred Aubert; Attendance: 3,749; Referee: Olivier Thual
	Penalties
	Bloudeau (penalty missed); Allée (penalty scored); Ndiaye (penalty scored) ? (penalty scored); Le Marer (penalty missed)		(penalty scored) Hamouda; (penalty scored) Auzou; (penalty scored) Berrehil; (penalty scored) Mendy

== Round of 32 ==
The draw for the tenth round (known as the round of 32) took place on 6 January 2020. This was an open draw.

The lowest ranked mainland teams remaining in the competition at this stage were AS Prix-lès-Mézières, Athlético Marseille, ESM Gonfreville and FC Limonest Saint-Didier, all from tier 5 (Championnat National 3).

Games were played on 16, 17, 18, 19 and 20 January 2020.

16 January 2020	Pau FC (3)	3–2 (a.e.t.)	Bordeaux (1)	Pau
20:55 CET	Name 23'; Jarju 44'; Gueye 117'	Report	Maja 41'; De Préville 81'	Stadium: Stade du Hameau; Attendance: 15,668; Referee: Hakim Ben El Hadj

17 January 2020	Granville (4)	0–3	Marseille (1)	Caen
21:05 CET		Report	Álvaro 77'; Radonjić 83'; Payet 90+2'	Stadium: Stade Michel d'Ornano; Attendance: 19,479; Referee: Antony Gautier

18 January 2020	SAS Épinal (4)	1–0 (a.e.t.)	(Réunion) JS Saint-Pierroise	Épinal
13:00 CET	Berkane 118'	Report		Stadium: Stade de la Colombière; Attendance: 3,500; Referee: Eric Wattellier

18 January 2020	Nice (1)	2–1	Red Star (3)	Nice (Note: Tie reversed from original draw, due to FFF security concerns over playing the game at Stade Bauer.)
13:00 CET	Danilo 26'; Ganago 29'	Report	Hamache 90+2' (pen.)	Stadium: Allianz Riviera; Attendance: 14,622; Referee: Clément Turpin

18 January 2020	AS Prix-lès-Mézières (5)	0–1	FC Limonest Saint-Didier (5)	Charleville-Mézières
13:00 CET		Report	Rouvière 53'	Stadium: Petit-Bois Stadium; Attendance: 2,372; Referee: Stéphanie Frappart

18 January 2020	ESM Gonfreville (5)	0–2	Lille (1)	Le Havre
15:00 CET		Report	Rémy 69'; Osimhen 90+2'	Stadium: Stade Océane; Attendance: 15,491; Referee: Willy Delajod

18 January 2020	ASM Belfort (4)	3–1	Nancy (2)	Belfort
15:00 CET	Grasso 7'; Régnier 73', 78' (pen.)	Report	Dembélé 25'	Stadium: Stade Roger Serzian; Attendance: 2,181; Referee: Nicolas Rainville

18 January 2020	Paris FC (2)	2–3	Saint-Étienne (1)	Paris
18:00 CET	Ménez 23'; Pitroipa 56'	Report	Khazri 31'; Abi 70'; Debuchy 78'	Stadium: Stade Sébastien Charléty; Attendance: 8,057; Referee: Frank Schneider

18 January 2020	Angoulême-Soyaux Charente (4)	1–5	Strasbourg (1)	Angoulême
18:00 CET	Franco 6'	Report	Zohi 34'; Thomasson 36'; Bellegarde 38'; Djiku 43'; Ajorque 82' (pen.)	Stadium: Stade Chanzy; Attendance: 5,945; Referee: Jérémy Stinat

18 January 2020	Nantes (1)	3–4	Lyon (1)	Nantes
20:55 CET	Emond 16'; Louza 83'; Simon 86'	Report	Cherki 2', 9'; Terrier 37'; Dembélé 69'	Stadium: Stade de la Beaujoire; Attendance: 24,511; Referee: Mikael Lesage

19 January 2020	FC Rouen (4)	1–4	Angers (1)	Le Petit-Quevilly
17:15 CET	Sidibé 13'	Report	Alioui 5'; El Melali 19', 23'; Bahoken 81'	Stadium: Stade Robert Diochon; Attendance: 10,600; Referee: Benoît Millot

19 January 2020	Athlético Marseille (5)	0–2	Rennes (1)	Fos-sur-Mer
17:15 CET		Report	Traoré 23'; Raphinha 45+2'	Stadium: Stade Parsemain; Attendance: 5,098; Referee: Amaury Delerue

19 January 2020	Montpellier (1)	5–0	Caen (2)	Montpellier
17:15 CET	Savanier 24' (pen.); Laborde 37'; Delort 40', 64'; Mollet 59'	Report		Stadium: Stade de la Mosson; Attendance: 4,697; Referee: Thomas Léonard

19 January 2020	Dijon (1)	5–0	Nîmes (1)	Dijon
17:15 CET	Cádiz 18' (pen.); Mavididi 75', 90'; Chouiar 79'; Manga 86'	Report		Stadium: Stade Gaston Gérard; Attendance: 7,964; Referee: Hakim Ben El Hadj

19 January 2020	Lorient (2)	0–1	Paris Saint-Germain (1)	Lorient
20:55 CET		Report	Sarabia 80'	Stadium: Stade du Moustoir; Attendance: 14,000; Referee: Karim Abed

20 January 2020	Saint-Pryvé Saint-Hilaire FC (4)	1–3	Monaco (1)	Orléans
20:55 CET	Antoine 83'	Report	Keita 12', 29'; Ben Yedder 36'	Stadium: Stade de la Source; Attendance: 7,300; Referee: Frank Schneider

== Round of 16 ==
The draw for the eleventh round (known as the round of 16) took place on 19 January 2020. This was an open draw.

The lowest ranked team remaining in the competition at this stage was FC Limonest Saint-Didier from tier 5 (Championnat National 3).

Games were played on 28, 29 and 30 January 2020.

28 January 2020	Angers (1)	4–5 (a.e.t.)	Rennes (1)	Angers
18:30 CET	Thioub 52', 85'; Bahoken 89' (pen.); Pereira Lage 105+1'	Report	Léa Siliki 37'; Niang 42', 61' (pen.); Gboho 101'; Gelin 110'	Stadium: Stade Raymond Kopa; Attendance: 9,821; Referee: Thomas Léonard

28 January 2020	ASM Belfort (4)	0–0 (a.e.t.) (5–4 p)	Montpellier (1)	Belfort
18:30 CET		Report		Stadium: Stade Roger Serzian; Attendance: 4,500; Referee: Olivier Thual
	Penalties
	Régnier (penalty scored); Magassouba (penalty scored); Grasso (penalty missed); Ranneaud (penalty scored); Cuenin (penalty scored); Loichot (penalty scored)		(penalty scored) Savanier; (penalty scored) Delort; (penalty missed) Sambia; (penalty scored) Laborde; (penalty scored) Camara; (penalty missed) Le Tallec

28 January 2020	FC Limonest Saint-Didier (5)	1–2 (a.e.t.)	Dijon (1)	Décines-Charpieu
18:30 CET	Bouzit 49'	Report	Cádiz 55'; Mavididi 120'	Stadium: Stade Groupama Training Center; Attendance: 2,600; Referee: Karim Abed

28 January 2020	Monaco (1)	0–1	Saint-Étienne (1)	Monaco
20:55 CET		Report	Bouanga 24'	Stadium: Stade Louis II; Attendance: 3,485; Referee: Johan Hamel

29 January 2020	Pau FC (3)	0–2	Paris Saint-Germain (1)	Pau
18:30 CET		Report	Paredes 25'; Sarabia 53'	Stadium: Stade du Hameau; Attendance: 16,707; Referee: Florent Batta

29 January 2020	SAS Épinal (4)	2–1	Lille (1)	Épinal
18:30 CET	Krasso 56', 62'	Report	Rémy 8'	Stadium: Stade de la Colombière; Attendance: 3,500; Referee: Jérôme Miguelgorry

29 January 2020	Marseille (1)	3–1	Strasbourg (1)	Marseille
21:05 CET	Sarr 32'; Payet 43' (pen.); Kamara 90+5'	Report	Corgnet 59'	Stadium: Stade Vélodrome; Attendance: 29,589; Referee: Mikael Lesage

30 January 2020	Nice (1)	1–2	Lyon (1)	Nice
20:55 CET	Ounas 89'	Report	Dembélé 15'; Aouar 90+3' (pen.)	Stadium: Allianz Riviera; Attendance: 9,646; Referee: Frank Schneider

== Quarter-finals ==
The draw for the quarter-finals took place on 30 January 2020. This was an open draw.

The lowest ranked teams remaining in the competition at this stage were ASM Belfort and SAS Épinal, both from tier 4 (Championnat National 2).

Games were played on 11, 12 and 13 February 2020.

11 February 2020	ASM Belfort (4)	0–3	Rennes (1)	Montbéliard
20:55 CET		Report	Raphinha 23'; Niang 71' (pen.); Siebatcheu 90+1'	Stadium: Stade Auguste Bonal; Attendance: 19,506; Referee: Amaury Delerue

12 February 2020	Dijon (1)	1–6	Paris Saint-Germain (1)	Dijon
18:30 CET	Chouiar 13'	Report	Lautoa 1' (o.g.); Mbappé 44'; Thiago Silva 50'; Sarabia 56', 90+1'; Coulibaly 86' (o.g.)	Stadium: Stade Gaston Gérard; Attendance: 14,193; Referee: Benoît Bastien

12 February 2020	Lyon (1)	1–0	Marseille (1)	Décines-Charpieu
21:05 CET	Aouar 81'	Report		Stadium: Parc Olympique Lyonnais; Attendance: 36,000; Referee: Benoît Millot

13 February 2020	SAS Épinal (4)	1–2	Saint-Étienne (1)	Tomblaine
21:00 CET	Krasso 62' (pen.)	Report	Bouanga 37'; Camara 58'	Stadium: Stade Marcel Picot; Attendance: 12,730; Referee: François Letexier

== Semi-finals ==
The draw for the semi-finals took place on 13 February 2020. This was an open draw.

Games were played on 4 and 5 March 2020.

4 March 2020	Lyon (1)	1–5	Paris Saint-Germain (1)	Décines-Charpieu
21:10 CET	Terrier 11'	Report	Mbappé 14', 70', 90+3'; Neymar 64' (pen.); Sarabia 82'	Stadium: Parc Olympique Lyonnais; Attendance: 42,500; Referee: Ruddy Buquet

5 March 2020	Saint-Étienne (1)	2–1	Rennes (1)	Saint-Étienne
20:55 CET	Kolodziejczak 43'; Boudebouz 90+4'	Report	Niang 33' (pen.)	Stadium: Stade Geoffroy-Guichard; Attendance: 30,535; Referee: Antony Gautier

== Final ==
The final was originally scheduled for 25 April 2020, but was postponed due to concerns over the COVID-19 pandemic.

24 July 2020
21:10 CEST

Paris Saint-Germain	1–0	Saint-Étienne
Neymar 14'

Stade de France, Saint-Denis
Attendance: 2,805 (Note: The final was played in front of 2,805 spectators due to the COVID-19 pandemic in France.)
Referee: Amaury Delerue
