= Youssouf Ahamadi =

Comorian international footballer (born 1982)

Personal information
- Date of birth: 27 July 1982 (age 44)
- Place of birth: Manjagou, Mayotte, France
- Height: 1.67 m (5 ft 6 in)
- Position: Right winger

Senior career*
Years	Team	Apps	(Gls)
2005–2008	Jura Sud	63	(19)
2008–2012	Besançon RC	103	(14)
2012–2019	Belfort	174	(30)
Total		340	(63)

International career
2014–2017	Comoros	11	(0)
- * Club domestic league appearances and goals

Youssouf Ahamadi (born 27 July 1982) is a former footballer who played as a right winger. Born in Mayotte, he played for the Comoros national team.

== Club career ==
Born in Manjagou, Mayotte, Ahamadi played club football for Jura Sud, Besançon RC, and Belfort. He retired at the end of the 2018–19 season.

== International career ==
Ahamadi made his international debut for Comoros in 2014.

== Career statistics ==
As of match played 25 May 2019

Appearances and goals by club, season and competition
Club	Season	League			National cup		Other		Total	
Club	Season	Division	Apps	Goals	Apps	Goals	Apps	Goals	Apps	Goals
Jura Sud	2005–06	CFA	2	0	0	0	0	0	2	0
Jura Sud	2006–07	CFA	30	9	0	0	0	0	30	9
Jura Sud	2007–08	CFA	31	10	0	0	0	0	31	10
Jura Sud	Total		63	19	0	0	0	0	63	19
Besançon RC	2008–09	CFA	26	6	1	0	0	0	27	6
Besançon RC	2009–10	CFA	19	2	2	0	0	0	21	2
Besançon RC	2010–11	CFA	28	5	2	0	0	0	30	5
Besançon RC	2011–12	National	30	1	0	0	0	0	30	1
Besançon RC	Total		103	14	5	0	0	0	108	14
Belfort	2012–13	CFA	29	4	2	0	0	0	31	4
Belfort	2013–14	CFA	23	3	1	0	0	0	24	3
Belfort	2014–15	CFA	25	9	0	0	0	0	25	9
Belfort	2015–16	National	23	5	0	0	0	0	23	5
Belfort	2016–17	National	26	4	1	0	0	0	27	4
Belfort	2017–18	National 2	27	3	2	0	0	0	29	3
Belfort	2018–19	National 2	21	2	0	0	0	0	21	2
Belfort	Total		174	30	6	0	0	0	180	30
Career total			340	63	11	0	0	0	351	63

=== International ===
Appearances and goals by national team and year
National team	Year	Apps	Goals
Comoros	2014	2	0
Comoros	2015	5	0
Comoros	2016	2	0
Comoros	2017	2	0
Total		11	0
