= Garot (surname) =

Garot is a surname. Notable people with the surname include:

- Guillaume Garot (born 1966), French politician
- Martin Garot (born 1988), French footballer
- Philippe Garot (1948–2023), Belgian footballer and manager
