= Makengo =

Makengo is a surname. Notable people with the surname include:

- Christopher Makengo (born 1994), French footballer
- Jean-Victor Makengo (born 1998), French footballer
- Jordy Makengo (born 2001), French footballer
- Terence Makengo (born 1992), French footballer
