= Alpha Kubota =

Japanese footballer (born 1996)

Personal information
- Date of birth: 19 July 1996 (age 30)
- Place of birth: Tokyo, Japan
- Height: 1.78 m (5 ft 10 in)
- Position: Winger

Team information
- Current team: Nîmes
- Number: 7

Senior career*
Years	Team	Apps	(Gls)
2015–2017	Drancy	16	(0)
2017–2018	Montceau Bourgogne	9	(3)
2018–2020	Épinal	41	(3)
2020–2021	Sedan	6	(2)
2021	Louhans-Cuiseaux	9	(1)
2022–2023	Saint-Priest	43	(7)
2023–2024	Furiani	12	(2)
2024–2025	Alès	24	(3)
2025–	Nîmes	14	(2)
- * Club domestic league appearances and goals as of 7 February 2026

Alpha Sawaneh Kubota (Japanese: 窪田アルファサワネ; born 19 July 1996) is a Japanese footballer who plays as a winger for French Championnat National 1 club Nîmes.

== Early life ==
Kubota was born on 19 July 1996 in Tokyo, Japan and is a native of Tokyo, Japan. Born to a Sierra Leonean father and a Japanese mother, he is a cousin of Guinean footballer Iya Traoré.

== Career ==
Kubota started his career with French side JA Drancy in 2015, where he made sixteen league appearances and scored zero goals. Two years later, he signed for FC Montceau Bourgogne, where he made nine league appearances and scored three goals, before signing for SAS Épinal in 2018, helping the club reach the quarter-finals of the 2019–20 Coupe de France.

In 2020, he signed for French side CS Sedan, where he made six league appearances and scored two goals. French magazine So Foot wrote in 2021 that he "has been a hit with National 2 clubs for six seasons. He rarely leaves anyone indifferent, thanks to his breakthrough performances on the right wing, and because he is the only Japanese player in the division" while playing for the club.

One year later, he signed for French side Louhans-Cuiseaux FC, where he made nine league appearances and scored one goal. Subsequently, he signed for French side AS Saint-Priest in 2022, where he made forty-three appearances and scored seven goals. During the summer of 2023, he signed for French side AS Furiani-Agliani, where he made twelve league appearances and scored two goals. Ahead of the 2024–25 season, he signed for French side Olympique Alès.

== Style of play ==
Kubota plays as a winger. Right-footed, he is known for his speed.
