= Pierre-Ange Omombé =

French association football player (born 1995)

Personal information
- Full name: Pierre-Ange Omombé Epoyo
- Date of birth: 9 March 1995 (age 31)
- Place of birth: Villemanoche, France
- Height: 1.73 m (5 ft 8 in)
- Position: Forward

Team information
- Current team: Colmar

Youth career
- 2011–2014: Orléans

Senior career*
Years	Team	Apps	(Gls)
2014–2015	Orléans	0	(0)
2015–2017	Paris FC	1	(0)
2017–2018	Olympique Saint-Quentin	22	(4)
2018–2019	Limoges	22	(5)
2019–2020	Raon l'Etape	16	(2)
2020–2021	Peterborough Sports		
2021–2022	Yaxley		
2022–2023	Raon-l'Étape B		
2023–2024	Vendée Fontenay	22	(13)
2024–	Colmar	7	(0)
- * Club domestic league appearances and goals as of 30 November 2024

Pierre-Ange Omombé Epoyo (born 9 March 1995) is a French footballer who plays for Championnat National 3 club Colmar as a forward.

== Playing career ==
=== Paris FC ===
Omombé played for Paris FC for two seasons between 2015 and 2017. He played once for the club in a Ligue 2 fixture on 18 December 2015, coming on 67th-minute substitute for Bocundji Cá in a 1–1 draw away to Valenciennes.

=== Peterborough Sports ===
Omombé moved to England and signed for Southern League Premier Division Central side Peterborough Sports on 16 October 2020.

== Career statistics ==
=== Club ===
As of match played 24 November 2020

Appearances and goals by club, season and competition
Club	Season	League			National Cup		League Cup		Other		Total	
Club	Season	Division	Apps	Goals	Apps	Goals	Apps	Goals	Apps	Goals	Apps	Goals
Paris FC	2015–16	Ligue 2	1	0	0	0	0	0	0	0	1	0
Peterborough Sports	2020–21	Southern League Premier Division Central	0	0	0	0	—		1 (Note: One appearance in FA Trophy)	0	1	0
Career total			1	0	0	0	0	0	1	0	2	0
