= Denis Bouanga =

French-Gabonese footballer (born 1994)

- Bouanga with Los Angeles FC in 2026

Personal information
- Full name: Denis Athanase Bouanga
- Date of birth: 11 November 1994 (age 32)
- Place of birth: Le Mans, France
- Height: 1.80 m (5 ft 11 in)
- Positions: Winger; forward

Team information
- Current team: Los Angeles FC
- Number: 99

Youth career
- –2011: SO Maine
- 2011–2013: Le Mans

Senior career*
| Years | Team | Apps | (Gls) |
| 2013–2014 | AS Mulsanne-Téloché | | (26) |
| 2014–2015 | Lorient B | 25 | (12) |
| 2014–2018 | Lorient | 39 | (10) |
| 2016 | → Strasbourg (loan) | 18 | (5) |
| 2016–2017 | → Tours (loan) | 36 | (16) |
| 2018–2019 | Nîmes | 35 | (8) |
| 2019–2022 | Saint-Étienne | 97 | (26) |
| 2022– | Los Angeles FC | 133 | (83) |

International career^{‡}
| 2017– | Gabon | 59 | (20) |
- * Club domestic league appearances and goals as of 7 November 2026 ‡ National team caps and goals as of 23:17, 17 November 2026 (UTC)

Denis Athanase Bouanga (born 11 November 1994) is a professional footballer who plays as a winger or forward for Major League Soccer club Los Angeles FC. Born in France, he represents the Gabon national team.

Bouanga began his career in France, making 136 Ligue 1 appearances for Lorient, Nîmes and Saint-Étienne and scoring 35 goals. In 2022, he signed for Los Angeles FC for a $5 million fee. In 2022, he helped the team win the Supporters' Shield and MLS Cup, while in 2023 he won the MLS Golden Boot. He is regarded as one of the greatest LAFC players of all time.

Bouanga made his international debut for Gabon in 2017, and was selected in the squads for three Africa Cup of Nations (in 2017, 2021 and 2025).

== Club career ==
=== Lorient ===
Born in Le Mans, Bouanga played as a youth for Stade Olympique du Maine and for two years at Le Mans FC but was released after two years at the latter club. In 2013, he started his senior career in the sixth-tier Division d'Honneur for Mulsanne. He was the top scorer in the Ligue de Maine in 2013–14 with 26 goals, and was then signed by Ligue 1 club Lorient; manager Franck Haise signed his younger brother Didier Bouanga as well.

Bouanga made his professional debut on 28 October 2014 in the third round of the Coupe de la Ligue, playing the full 90 minutes of a 2–1 win at Evian. Four days later he made his one top-flight appearance of the season, the last eight minutes as a substitute for Raphaël Guerreiro in a 2–1 home loss to Paris Saint-Germain. On 29 August 2015, he scored his only Ligue 1 goal for Les Merlus, equalising in a 4–1 loss at Reims.

Bouanga was loaned to Strasbourg in the third-tier Championnat National on 3 January 2016, for the remainder of the season. He scored five goals, all in his first eight games, including two in a 3–0 win away to Alsace rivals Colmar on 11 March; Strasbourg ended the season as league champions.

In 2016–17, Bouanga was lent out again, this time to Tours in Ligue 2. He ranked third in the league with 16 goals. In July 2017, he signed a new deal at Lorient for four years; despite his rare opportunities at the club, he cited his upcoming fatherhood as a reason to commit to the club. Saint-Étienne and Valencia had tracked him after his season at Tours.

Representing Lorient in the 2017–18 Ligue 2 season, Bouanga scored nine goals in 34 games. On 24 April, he was sent off in a 1–0 loss at Nîmes for a dangerous tackle, as were teammate Ibrahima Conte and opponent Téji Savanier.

=== Nîmes and Saint-Étienne ===
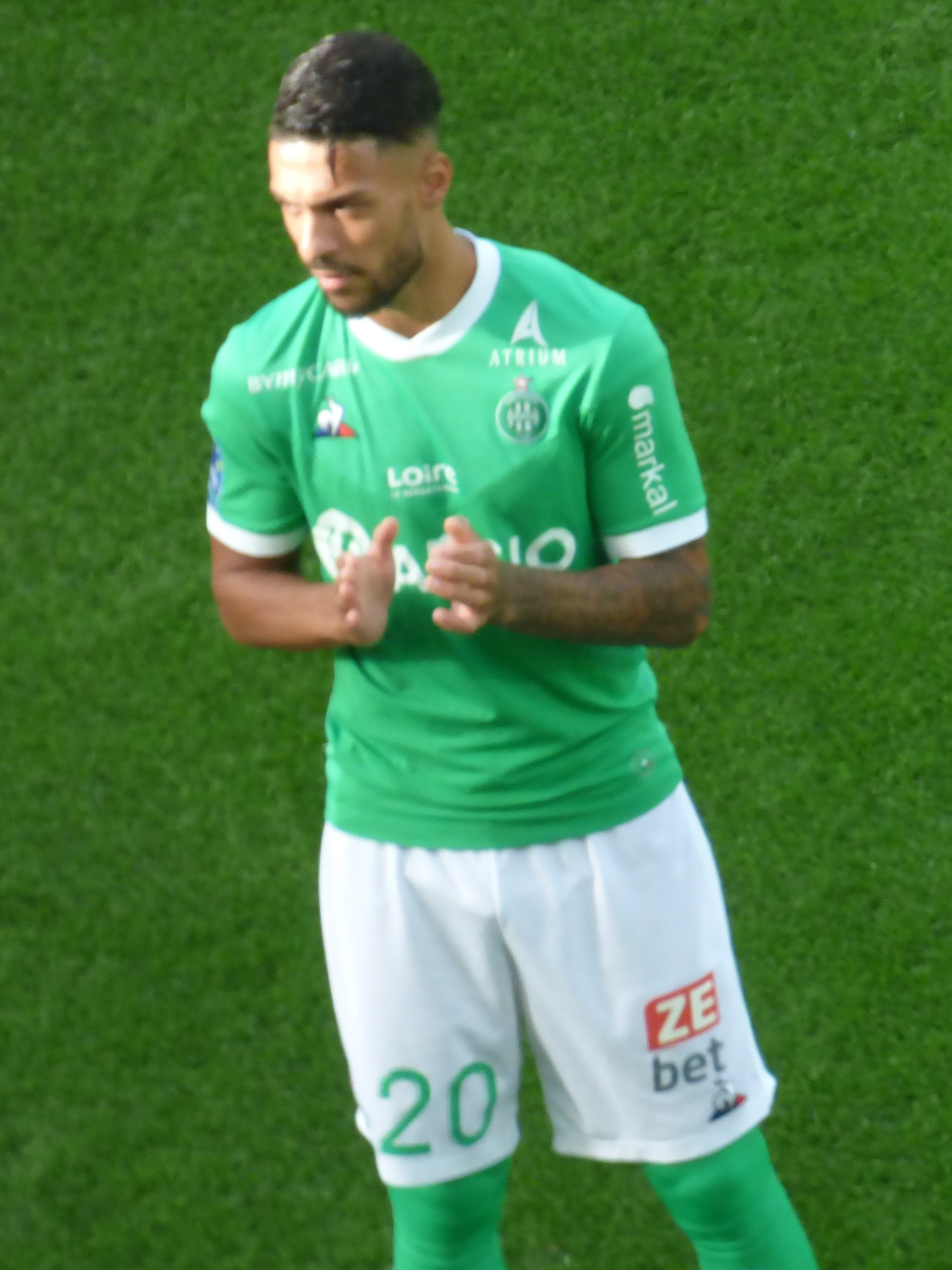
Bouanga playing for Saint-Étienne in 2020.

In July 2018, Bouanga joined Nîmes in Ligue 1 on a three-year contract for a reported transfer fee of €3 million. A year later, having scored eight goals in his one season at Nîmes, he joined Saint-Étienne for €4.5 million on a four-year deal.

Bouanga scored 10 goals in 26 games in his first league season for ASSE, which was curtailed by the COVID-19 pandemic. He also helped them to the Coupe de France final by scoring the only goal away to Monaco in the last 16, and one more goal in a 2–1 win in the next round at Épinal.

In Bouanga's final game for Saint-Étienne, a 2–1 loss to Dijon on the first day of the 2022–23 Ligue 2 season, he was sent off at the end for insulting the referee.

=== Los Angeles FC ===
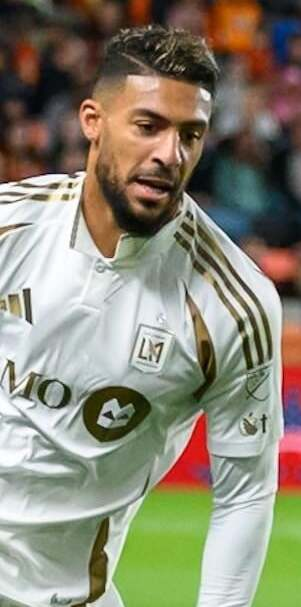
Bouanga playing for Los Angeles FC in 2025.

On 5 August 2022, Bouanga was acquired by Los Angeles FC of Major League Soccer for a $5 million fee. On 2 October, he scored the match-winning goal in the 95th minute against Portland Timbers to win 2–1, clinching LAFC's second Supporters' Shield and his first trophy with the club. Eighteen days later, he netted twice in a 3–2 win at home to LA Galaxy in the Western Conference semi-finals of the MLS Cup playoffs. On 5 November, his team won MLS Cup 2022 by beating Philadelphia Union 3–0 on penalties after a 3–3 extra-time draw; he was among the penalty scorers.

In 2023, after scoring twice and tallying one assist in the club's 4–0 victory over New England Revolution, Bouanga was named to the league's Team of the Matchday for week three. On 9 March 2023, Bouanga scored his first hat-trick of his career with a 3–0 victory at L.D. Alajuelense during the first leg in the two club's Round of 16 showdown in the CONCACAF Champions League. Just under a month later on 8 April 2023, Bouanga scored his second hat-trick of his career in a 3–0 win at home over Austin FC. In 2023, he was the most prolific African goalscorer in top tier matches with 40 goals, including 38 for Los Angeles, finishing ahead of Mohamed Salah (36). In the following year, however, he finished joint-third with 30 goals, only behind Salah (33) and Ayoub El Kaabi (41). On 21 September 2025 Bouanga earned is second hat trick in three matches after a 4–1 defeat of Real Salt Lake. As of September 2025, Bouanga is tied with Lionel Messi for goals scored in the MLS.

On 31 May 2025, he scored an extra-time goal in a 2–1 play-off victory over Club América, securing his club's participation in the 2025 FIFA Club World Cup. During the tournament, he scored only goal, in a 1–1 draw with Brazilian side Flamengo, becoming the first-ever Gabonese goalscorer in the history of the Club World Cup. On 18 September 2025, Bouanga passed Carlos Vela's record and became the top goal scorer for LAFC following their 4–1 win at Real Salt Lake.

== International career ==
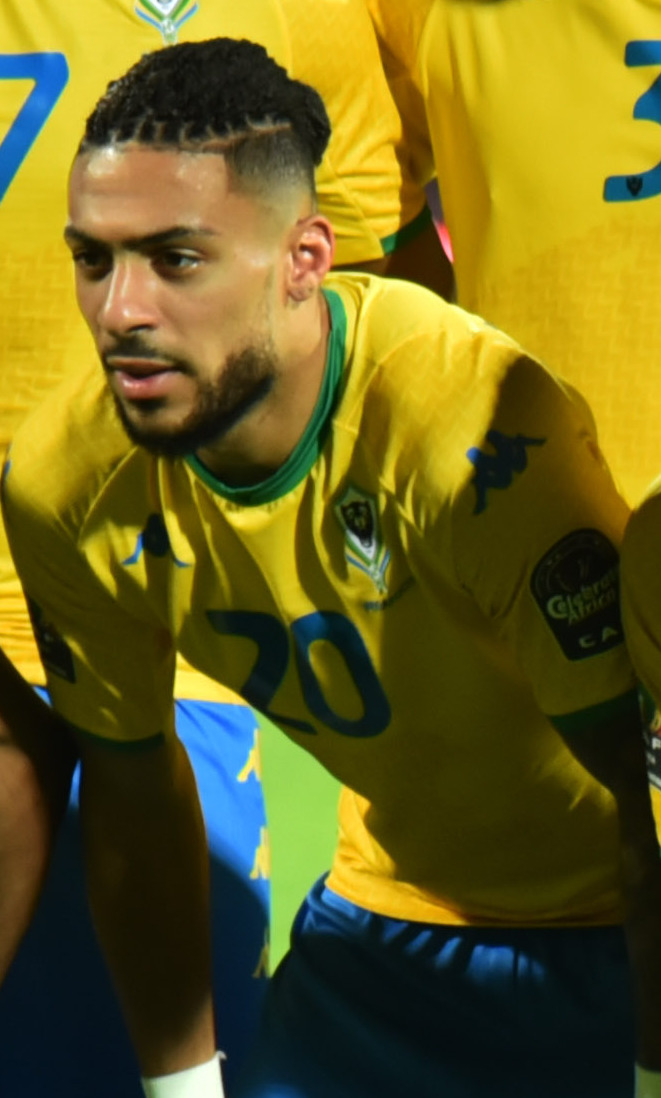
Bouanga playing for Gabon national team in 2022.

Bouanga first received a call-up to the Gabon national team for a match against Mauritania on 28 May 2016. He made the final squad for Gabon for the 2017 Africa Cup of Nations.

In January 2017, he was selected by Gabonese coach José Antonio Camacho to participate in the Africa Cup of Nations held in Gabon during which he took part in all the matches of his selection in the competition. Even though Gabon failed to pass the group stage, Bouanga's fine performances did not go unappreciated, as he won two consecutive "Total Man of the Match" trophies for his performances against Burkina Faso and Cameroon.

Bouanga scored his first international goal for Gabon in a friendly match on 24 March 2017 against Guinea.

On 3 September 2025, Bouanga scored a first half hat-trick for Gabon in a 4–0 win over Seychelles to help bring the team to the top of their 2026 World Cup qualifying group. In the 2025 Africa Cup of Nations, Gabon finished bottom of their group without earning a single point. The Gabonese sports ministry reacted to the national team's performance in the tournament by suspending the national team indefinitely and banning Bruno Ecuele Manga and Pierre-Emerick Aubameyang. During the tournament, Bouanga scored one goal as Gabon tried and failed to come back against the Ivory Coast in the final group stage match, ultimately losing 3–2.

== Personal life ==
Bouanga was born in France to a Gabonese father and a French mother. His brother Didier is also a footballer.

== Career statistics ==
=== Club ===
As of match played 7 November 2026

Appearances and goals by club, season and competition
| Club | Season | League | | | National cup (Note: Includes Coupe de France, U.S. Open Cup) | | League cup (Note: Includes Coupe de la Ligue) | | Continental | | Other | | Total | |
| Club | Season | Division | Apps | Goals | Apps | Goals | Apps | Goals | Apps | Goals | Apps | Goals | Apps | Goals |
|---|---|---|---|---|---|---|---|---|---|---|---|---|---|---|
| AS Mulsanne-Téloché | 2013–14 | Division d'Honneur | | | | | — | | — | | — | | | |
| Lorient B | 2014–15 | CFA | 19 | 10 | — | | — | | — | | — | | 19 | 10 |
| Lorient B | 2015–16 | CFA | 6 | 2 | — | | — | | — | | — | | 6 | 2 |
| Lorient B | Total | | 25 | 12 | — | | — | | — | | — | | 25 | 12 |
| Lorient | 2014–15 | Ligue 1 | 1 | 0 | 0 | 0 | 1 | 0 | — | | — | | 2 | 0 |
| Lorient | 2015–16 | Ligue 1 | 4 | 1 | 0 | 0 | 1 | 0 | — | | — | | 5 | 1 |
| Lorient | 2017–18 | Ligue 2 | 34 | 9 | 4 | 5 | 3 | 1 | — | | — | | 41 | 15 |
| Lorient | Total | | 39 | 10 | 4 | 5 | 5 | 1 | — | | — | | 48 | 16 |
| Strasbourg (loan) | 2015–16 | Championnat National | 18 | 5 | — | | — | | — | | — | | 18 | 5 |
| Tours (loan) | 2016–17 | Ligue 2 | 36 | 16 | 0 | 0 | 1 | 0 | — | | — | | 37 | 16 |
| Nîmes | 2018–19 | Ligue 1 | 35 | 8 | 1 | 0 | 2 | 1 | — | | — | | 38 | 9 |
| Saint-Étienne | 2019–20 | Ligue 1 | 26 | 10 | 4 | 2 | 1 | 0 | 5 (Note: Appearances in UEFA Europa League) | 0 | — | | 36 | 12 |
| Saint-Étienne | 2020–21 | Ligue 1 | 36 | 7 | — | | — | | — | | — | | 36 | 7 |
| Saint-Étienne | 2021–22 | Ligue 1 | 34 | 9 | 1 | 0 | — | | — | | 2 (Note: Appearances in Ligue 1 relegation/promotion play-offs) | 0 | 37 | 9 |
| Saint-Étienne | 2022–23 | Ligue 2 | 1 | 0 | — | | — | | — | | — | | 1 | 0 |
| Saint-Étienne | Total | | 97 | 26 | 5 | 2 | 1 | 0 | 5 | 0 | 2 | 0 | 110 | 28 |
| Los Angeles | 2022 | MLS | 7 | 1 | 0 | 0 | — | | — | | 3 (Note: Appearances in MLS Cup playoffs) | 2 | 10 | 3 |
| Los Angeles | 2023 | MLS | 31 | 20 | 0 | 0 | — | | 8 (Note: Appearances in CONCACAF Champions League/Cup) | 7 | 9 (Note: Three appearances and six goals in Leagues Cup, one appearance in Campeones Cup, five appearances and five goals in MLS Cup playoffs) | 11 | 48 | 38 |
| Los Angeles | 2024 | MLS | 32 | 20 | 5 | 1 | — | | — | | 11 (Note: Seven appearances and six goals in Leagues Cup, four appearances and one goal in MLS Cup playoffs) | 7 | 48 | 28 |
| Los Angeles | 2025 | MLS | 31 | 24 | — | | — | | 6 | 3 | 9 (Note: One appearance and one goal in FIFA Club World Cup play-in, three appearances and one goal in FIFA Club World Cup, two appearances and one goal in Leagues Cup, three appearances and two goals in MLS Cup playoffs) | 5 | 46 | 32 |
| Los Angeles | 2026 | MLS | 32 | 18 | — | | — | | 7 | 5 | 3 (Note: Appearances in Leagues Cup) | 2 | 42 | 25 |
| Los Angeles | Total | | 133 | 83 | 5 | 1 | 0 | 0 | 21 | 15 | 34 | 27 | 194 | 126 |
| Career total | | | 383 | 160 | 15 | 8 | 9 | 2 | 26 | 15 | 36 | 27 | 470 | 212 |

=== International ===
As of match played 17 November 2026

Appearances and goals by national team and year
| National team | Year | Apps | Goals |
|---|---|---|---|
| Gabon | 2017 | 9 | 2 |
| Gabon | 2018 | 3 | 1 |
| Gabon | 2019 | 5 | 2 |
| Gabon | 2020 | 3 | 1 |
| Gabon | 2021 | 6 | 1 |
| Gabon | 2022 | 7 | 0 |
| Gabon | 2023 | 5 | 2 |
| Gabon | 2024 | 7 | 2 |
| Gabon | 2025 | 10 | 6 |
| Gabon | 2026 | 4 | 3 |
| Total | | 59 | 20 |

Scores and results list Gabon's goal tally first, score column indicates score after each Bouanga goal.

List of international goals scored by Denis Bouanga
| No. | Date | Venue | Opponent | Score | Result | Competition |
|---|---|---|---|---|---|---|
| 1 | 24 March 2017 | Stade Océane, Le Havre, France | Guinea | 1–1 | 2–2 | Friendly |
| 2 | 10 June 2017 | 26 March Stadium, Bamako, Mali | Mali | 1–0 | 1–2 | 2019 Africa Cup of Nations qualification |
| 3 | 12 October 2018 | Stade d'Angondjé, Libreville, Gabon | South Sudan | 1–0 | 3–0 | 2019 Africa Cup of Nations qualification |
| 4 | 15 October 2019 | Ibn Battouta Stadium, Tangier, Morocco | Morocco | 2–1 | 3–2 | Friendly |
| 5 | 17 November 2019 | Franceville Stadium, Franceville, Gabon | Angola | 2–0 | 2–1 | 2021 Africa Cup of Nations qualification |
| 6 | 12 November 2020 | Franceville Stadium, Franceville, Gabon | Gambia | 1–0 | 2–1 | 2021 Africa Cup of Nations qualification |
| 7 | 25 March 2021 | Franceville Stadium, Franceville, Gabon | DR Congo | 2–0 | 3–0 | 2021 Africa Cup of Nations qualification |
| 8 | 16 November 2023 | Franceville Stadium, Franceville, Gabon | Kenya | 1–1 | 2–1 | 2026 FIFA World Cup qualification |
| 9 | 19 November 2023 | National Stadium, Dar es Salaam, Tanzania | Burundi | 2–0 | 2–1 | 2026 FIFA World Cup qualification |
| 10 | 11 June 2024 | Franceville Stadium, Franceville, Gabon | Gambia | 3–1 | 3–2 | 2026 FIFA World Cup qualification |
| 11 | 15 November 2024 | Franceville Stadium, Franceville, Gabon | Morocco | 1–0 | 1–5 | 2025 Africa Cup of Nations qualification |
| 12 | 20 March 2025 | Franceville Stadium, Franceville, Gabon | Seychelles | 2–0 | 3–0 | 2026 FIFA World Cup qualification |
| 13 | 20 March 2025 | Franceville Stadium, Franceville, Gabon | Seychelles | 3–0 | 3–0 | 2026 FIFA World Cup qualification |
| 14 | 3 September 2025 | Côte d'Or National Sports Complex, Saint-Pierre, Mauritius | Seychelles | 1–0 | 4–0 | 2026 FIFA World Cup qualification |
| 15 | 3 September 2025 | Côte d'Or National Sports Complex, Saint-Pierre, Mauritius | Seychelles | 2–0 | 4–0 | 2026 FIFA World Cup qualification |
| 16 | 3 September 2025 | Côte d'Or National Sports Complex, Saint-Pierre, Mauritius | Seychelles | 3–0 | 4–0 | 2026 FIFA World Cup qualification |
| 17 | 31 December 2025 | Marrakesh Stadium, Marrakesh, Morocco | Ivory Coast | 2–0 | 2–3 | 2025 Africa Cup of Nations |
| 18 | 29 September 2026 | Franceville Stadium, Franceville, Gabon | Niger | 2–0 | 2–0 | 2027 Africa Cup of Nations qualification |
| 19 | 13 November 2026 | Franceville Stadium, Franceville, Gabon | Lesotho | 1–0 | 2–0 | 2027 Africa Cup of Nations qualification |
| 20 | 13 November 2026 | Franceville Stadium, Franceville, Gabon | Lesotho | 2–0 | 2–0 | 2027 Africa Cup of Nations qualification |

== Honours ==
Strasbourg

- Championnat National: 2015–16

Saint-Étienne

- Coupe de France runner-up: 2019–20

Los Angeles FC

- MLS Cup: 2022
- Supporters' Shield: 2022
- U.S. Open Cup: 2024
- CONCACAF Champions League runner-up: 2023
- Leagues Cup runner-up: 2024

Gabon

- King's Cup third place: 2018

Individual

- CONCACAF Champions League Golden Boot: 2023
- CONCACAF Champions League Best XI: 2023
- MLS All-Star: 2023, 2024, 2025
- MLS Best XI: 2023, 2024, 2025
- MLS Golden Boot: 2023
- MLS Player of the Month: October 2023, September 2025
