= Stade Émile-Stahl =

Stadium in Strasbourg, France

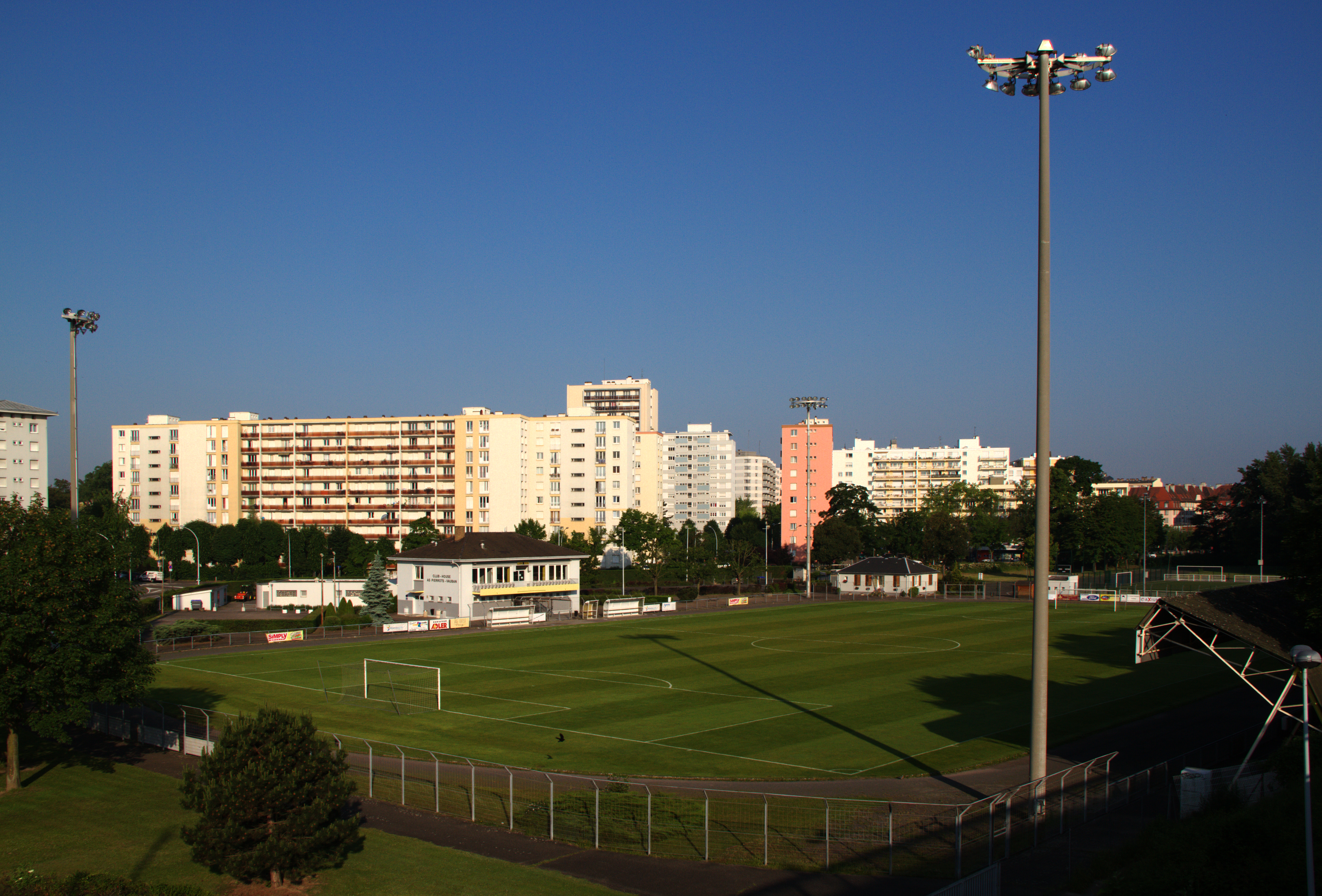

- Location within France
- Address: 5, place de Kehl; 67000 Strasbourg
- Coordinates: 48.579°N 7.779°E
- Capacity: 3,000 (of which 600 are grandstand)
- Surface: Natural grass
- Field size: 107 m × 70 m

Construction
- Built: c. 1920

Tenant
- ASPV Strasbourg

The Stade Émile-Stahl is a stadium located in the municipality of Strasbourg in France. With a capacity of 3,000 places (of which 600 places are in the grandstand), its resident club is ASPV Strasbourg. It is the second largest football stadium in the city, after the Stade de la Meinau.

== History ==
The stadium was built around 1920. ASPV Strasbourg settled there during World War II. Formerly called the Stade de la Porte de Kehl, on 22 August 2009, it was renamed to the Stade Émile-Stahl in honor of a former officer of the resident club. This name change was inaugurated by the Mayor of Strasbourg, Roland Ries, accompanied by the club president and other personalities.
