= Kévin Renaut =

French footballer (born 1991)

Personal information
- Date of birth: 28 April 1991 (age 35)
- Place of birth: Marseille, France
- Height: 1.85 m (6 ft 1 in)
- Position: Defender

Team information
- Current team: Istres
- Number: 28

Senior career*
Years	Team	Apps	(Gls)
2010–2012	Martigues	9	(0)
2012–2014	US Le Pontet	53	(4)
2014–2016	Nîmes B	27	(3)
2014–2016	Nîmes	14	(0)
2016–2019	Marignane Gignac	74	(7)
2019–2023	Villefranche	85	(0)
2023–2024	Pays de Grasse	4	(0)
2024–	Istres	0	(0)
- * Club domestic league appearances and goals as of 16 November 2024

Kévin Renaut (born 28 April 1991) is a French footballer who plays as a defender for Championnat National 1 club Istres.

== Career ==
Renaut played professionally in Ligue 2 for Nîmes from 2015 to 2016. He made his debut on 16 January 2015 in a 2–0 victory over Valenciennes.

On 13 June 2019, Renaut joined FC Villefranche.
