= Lassana Diakhaby =

Mauritanian footballer (born 1996)

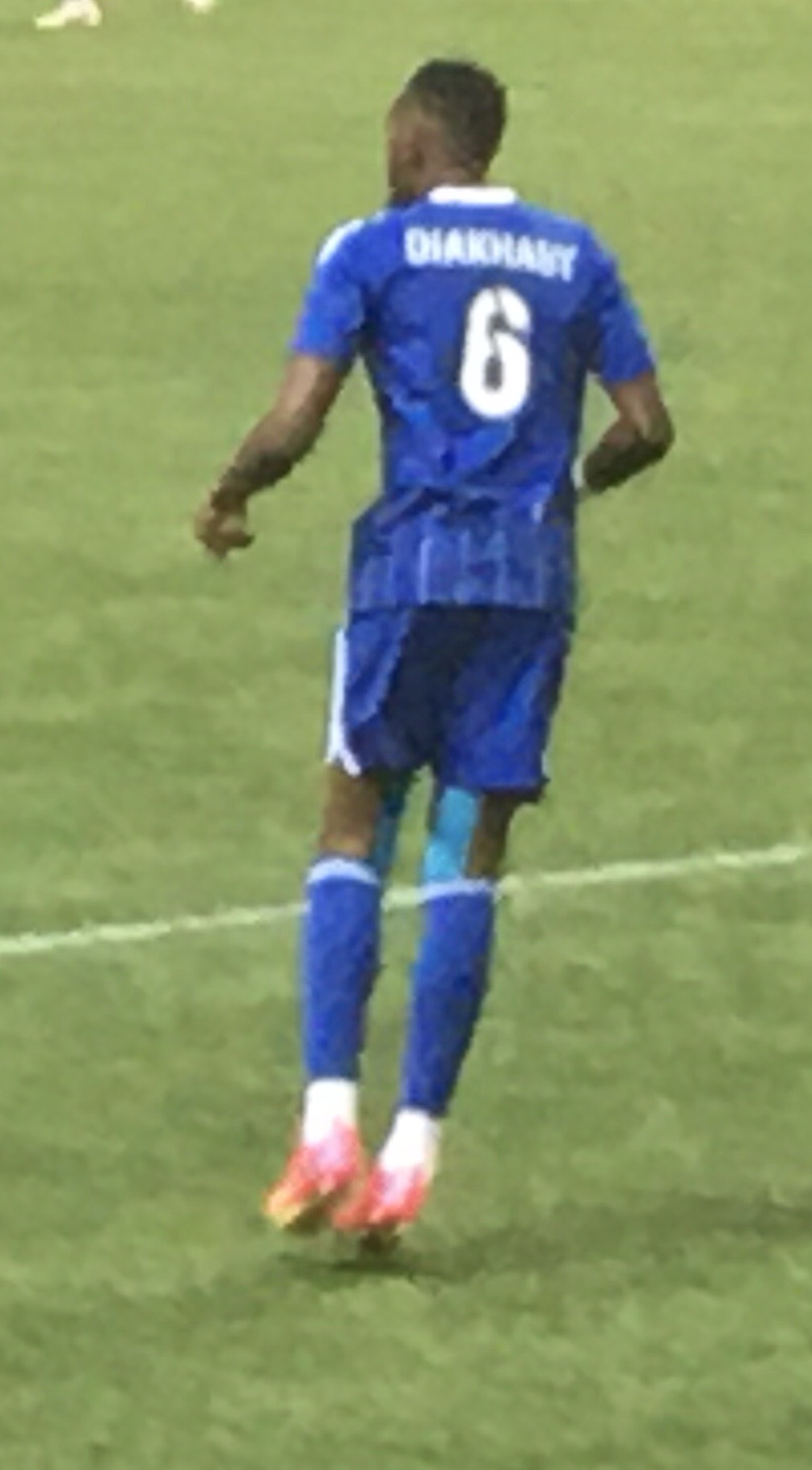
- Diakhaby in 2023

Personal information
- Date of birth: 1 January 1996 (age 30)
- Place of birth: Paris, France
- Height: 1.84 m (6 ft 0 in)
- Position: Left-back

Team information
- Current team: Châteauroux
- Number: 29

Youth career
- 2012–2014: Troyes

Senior career*
Years	Team	Apps	(Gls)
2014–2015	Troyes II	2	(0)
2015–2016	Angers II	18	(0)
2016–2018	Virton	30	(0)
2018–2020	Rodange	37	(7)
2020–2021	Trélissac	20	(0)
2021–2022	Fréjus Saint-Raphaël	5	(0)
2022–2023	Martigues	53	(0)
2023–2025	Versailles	39	(3)
2025–2026	Créteil	10	(0)
2026–	Châteauroux	10	(0)

International career^{‡}
2023–	Mauritania	3	(0)
- * Club domestic league appearances and goals as of 24 June 2026 ‡ National team caps and goals as of 6 February 2026

Lassana Diakhaby (born 1 January 1996) is a professional footballer who plays as a left-back for Championnat National 1 club Châteauroux. Born in France, he plays for the Mauritania national team.

== Club career ==
Diakhaby began his career in his native France with the reserves of Troyes and Angers. In the summer of 2016, he moved to Virton where he spent a couple of seasons. He then moved to the Luxembourgian club Rodange on 19 January 2018, where he helped them win the 2018–2019 Luxembourg Division of Honour and earn a promotion. He returned to France with Trélissac in 2020, and the next season had a stint with Fréjus Saint-Raphaël. On 22 June 2021, he moved to Martigues, again achieving promotion into the Championnat National.

== International career ==
Born in France, Diakhaby is French, Mauritanian and Senegalese. He was called up to the Mauritania national team for a set of 2023 Africa Cup of Nations qualification matches against the DR Congo in March 2023.

== Personal life ==
Diakhaby's twin brother Alfhhusein Diakhaby is a semi-pro footballer.

== Honours ==
Rodange

- Luxembourg Division of Honour: 2018–2019
