= Mehdi Kadi =

French footballer (born 1994)

Personal information
- Date of birth: 21 September 1994 (age 32)
- Place of birth: Tarare, France
- Height: 1.75 m (5 ft 9 in)
- Position: Forward

Team information
- Current team: Cannet Rocheville

Senior career*
Years	Team	Apps	(Gls)
2012–2013	Troyes B	6	(1)
2013–2016	Bourg-Péronnas	9	(1)
2016–2018	Jura Sud	56	(15)
2018–2020	Annecy	43	(5)
2020–2023	Cannes	64	(8)
2023–2024	Pays de Grasse	19	(0)
2024–	Cannet Rocheville	9	(3)
- * Club domestic league appearances and goals as of 14 December 2024

Mehdi Kadi (born 21 September 1994) is a French footballer who plays as a forward for Championnat National 3 club Cannet Rocheville.

== Career statistics ==
As of match played 1 July 2018

Appearances and goals by club, season and competition
Club	Season	League			Domestic Cup		League Cup		Other		Total	
Club	Season	Division	Apps	Goals	Apps	Goals	Apps	Goals	Apps	Goals	Apps	Goals
Troyes II	2012–13	CFA 2	6	1	—		—		—		6	1
Bourg-en-Bresse	2013–14	National	1	0	0	0	—		—		1	0
Bourg-en-Bresse	2014–15	National	6	1	0	0	—		—		6	1
Bourg-en-Bresse	2015–16	Ligue 2	2	0	1	0	0	0	—		3	0
Bourg-en-Bresse	Total		9	1	1	0	0	0	0	0	10	1
Jura Sud	2016–17	CFA	26	2	0	0	—		—		26	2
Jura Sud	2017–18	National 2	30	13	0	0	—		—		30	13
Jura Sud	Total		56	15	0	0	0	0	0	0	56	15
Career total			71	17	1	0	0	0	0	0	72	17
