= Anthony Schuster =

French footballer (born 1990)

Personal information
- Date of birth: 22 March 1990 (age 36)
- Place of birth: Marseille, France
- Height: 1.78 m (5 ft 10 in)
- Position: Midfielder

Team information
- Current team: GC Lucciana

Senior career*
Years	Team	Apps	(Gls)
–2010	Toulouse B		
2010–2011	Montauban		
2011–2017	Les Herbiers	154	(36)
2017–2019	Tubize	51	(4)
2019–2021	Les Herbiers	26	(3)
2021–2022	Bastia-Borgo	12	(0)
2022–	GC Lucciana	12	(6)
- * Club domestic league appearances and goals as of 4 February 2023

Anthony Schuster (born 22 March 1990) is a French professional footballer who plays as a midfielder for Championnat National 3 club GC Lucciana.

== Career ==
After having played six years at Les Herbiers, Schuster left the club to join Belgian side Tubize in the summer 2017. But ahead of the 2019–20 season, he returned to Les Herbiers.

In August 2021, Schuster signed with Bastia-Borgo.
