= Jad Mouaddib =

French footballer (born 1999)

Personal information
- Date of birth: 5 April 1999 (age 27)
- Place of birth: Lens, France
- Height: 1.73 m (5 ft 8 in)
- Position: Midfielder

Youth career
- 2006–2010: AG Caennaise
- 2010–2019: Caen

Senior career*
Years	Team	Apps	(Gls)
2017–2019	Caen B	31	(3)
2019–2020	Caen	1	(1)
2019–2020	→ Granville (loan)	14	(2)
2021	Farul Constanța II		
2021–2022	Virton	10	(0)

International career
2015	France U16	4	(0)
- * Club domestic league appearances and goals as of 20:28, 30 July 2023 (UTC)

Jad Mouaddib (born 5 April 1999) is a French professional footballer who plays as a midfielder.

== International career ==
Mouaddib has represented France at youth international level. He holds both French and Moroccan nationalities.

== Career statistics ==
=== Club ===
As of 16 August 2021

Club	Season	League			Cup		Other		Total	
Club	Season	Division	Apps	Goals	Apps	Goals	Apps	Goals	Apps	Goals
Caen B	2016–17	Championnat de France Amateur 2	3	0	–		0	0	3	0
Caen B	2017–18	Championnat National 3	5	0	–		0	0	5	0
Caen B	2018–19	Championnat National 3	21	3	–		0	0	21	3
Caen B	2019–20	Championnat National 3	2	0	–		0	0	2	0
Caen B	Total		31	1	0	0	0	0	31	3
Caen	2018–19	Ligue 1	0	0	1 (Note: Appearance(s) in the Coupe de France)	1	0	0	1	1
Caen	2019–20	Ligue 2	0	0	0	0	0	0	0	0
Caen	Total		0	0	1	1	0	0	1	1
Granville (loan)	2019–20	Championnat National 2	14	2	3	2	0	0	17	4
Virton	2021–22	Proximus League	1	0	0	0	0	0	1	0
Career total			46	3	4	3	0	0	50	6
