= Christopher Makengo =

French footballer (born 1994)

Personal information
- Full name: Christopher Sorrene Makengo
- Date of birth: 7 July 1994 (age 32)
- Place of birth: France
- Position: Midfielder

Senior career*
Years	Team	Apps	(Gls)
2017	Thunder Bay Chill	12	(2)
2018	NK Aluminij	9	(1)
2018–2019	Niki Volos		
2019–2020	SAS Épinal	28	(3)
2020–2021	AS Béziers	1	(0)
2021–	ASM Belfort	9	(0)
- * Club domestic league appearances and goals as of 10:11, 4 January 2022 (UTC)

Christopher Sorrene Makengo (born 7 July 1994) is a French footballer who plays as a midfielder for ASM Belfort.
