= Thomas Régnier =

French footballer (born 1984)

Personal information
- Date of birth: 11 March 1984 (age 42)
- Place of birth: Belfort, France
- Height: 1.81 m (5 ft 11 in)
- Position: Striker

Team information
- Current team: Belfort
- Number: 9

Youth career
- –2003: Belfort

Senior career*
Years	Team	Apps	(Gls)
2003–2007	Sochaux	1	(0)
2005–2006	→ Clermont (loan)	8	(1)
2006–2007	→ Châtellerault (loan)	34	(5)
2007–2008	Cannes	34	(2)
2008–2009	Mulhouse	33	(24)
2009–2010	Reims	24	(0)
2010	Colmar	14	(1)
2010–2011	Mulhouse	12	(1)
2011–2013	Lille B	37	(7)
2013–	Belfort	265	(74)
- * Club domestic league appearances and goals as of 18:41, 28 January 2024 (UTC)

Thomas Régnier (born 11 March 1984) is a French professional footballer who plays as a striker for Championnat National 1 club Belfort.

== Career ==
Régnier played on the professional level in Ligue 1 for Sochaux and in Ligue 2 for Clermont. He played 2 games for Sochaux in the 2004–05 UEFA Cup.
