= Mangajou =

Village in the commune of Sada on Mayotte, France

Coordinates: 12°50′41″S 45°7′0″E

Mangajou is a village in the commune of Sada on Mayotte.
