= Didier Bouanga =

French footballer (born 1995)

Didier Bouanga (born 14 December 1995, in Le Mans) is a French footballer who last played as a striker for Olympique Saumur FC.

== Early life ==
Bouanga was born in France to a Gabonese father and a French mother.

== Career ==
Bouanga started his career with French Ligue 1 side FC Lorient, where he suffered an injury. In 2017, Bouanga signed for French side AS Mulsanne-Teloché, where he was regarded as having "a major role at the forefront of the attack". In 2020, he signed for French side Olympique Saumur FC, where he was regarded to have initially performed well for the club.

== Style of play ==
Bouanga mainly operates as a striker and is known for his speed.

== Personal life ==
Bouanga is the younger brother of Gabon international Denis Bouanga.
