= Moulaye Ba =

French footballer (born 1990)

Idrissa Ba
Personal information
- Full name: Moulaye Idrissa Ba
- Date of birth: 11 November 1990 (age 35)
- Place of birth: Échirolles, France
- Height: 1.85 m (6 ft 1 in)
- Position: Forward

Team information
- Current team: Bourgoin-Jallieu
- Number: 19

Senior career*
Years	Team	Apps	(Gls)
2010–2012	Fréjus Saint-Raphaël B	16	(6)
2010–2014	Fréjus Saint-Raphaël	36	(3)
2014–2016	Bourg-en-Bresse (Note: In 2015, FC Bourg-Péronnas became Football Bourg-en-Bresse Péronnas 01.)	62	(6)
2016–2018	Les Herbiers B	13	(3)
2016–2018	Les Herbiers	35	(5)
2018–2019	Dunkerque	25	(1)
2019	Dunkerque B	4	(0)
2020–2021	Pau	39	(4)
2021–2022	Bastia-Borgo	26	(7)
2022–2025	Villefranche	88	(20)
2025–	Bourgoin-Jallieu	10	(4)
- * Club domestic league appearances and goals as of 13 December 2025

Moulaye Idrissa Ba, known as Idrissa Ba (born 11 November 1990) is a French professional footballer who plays as a forward for Championnat National 3 club Bourgoin-Jallieu.

== Club career ==
On 25 August 2021, Ba joined Bastia-Borgo.

On 20 June 2022, Ba signed with Villefranche.

== Personal life ==
Born in France, Ba is of Senegalese and Mauritanian descent.

== Honours ==
Les Herbiers

- Coupe de France runner-up: 2017–18
