= AS Pierrots Vauban Strasbourg =

Vauban Strasbourg
- Full name: Association Sportive Pierrots Vauban Strasbourg
- Short name: ASPV Strasbourg; Vauban Strasbourg
- Founded: February 1921; 105 years ago
- Ground: Stadium Emile-Stahl
- Capacity: 3,000
- President: Serge Comtesse
- Coach: Djamel Ferdjani
- Website: www.aspierrotsvauban.fr
Home colours	Away colours

Association Sportive Pierrots Vauban de Strasbourg, known as ASPV Strasbourg and Vauban Strasbourg, is a French association football team based in Strasbourg, France, which currently plays in the Régional 1 Grand-Est.

The club plays at the Stadium Emile-Stahl in Strasbourg, which has a capacity of 3,000. Former Arsenal manager Arsène Wenger played for Vauban from 1975 to 1978, and scored 20 goals in 80 league appearances.

== History ==
The club was founded in February 1921. It has played entirely at the amateur level, except for one season in 2nd Division in 1970–71. In the 1980s the club declined invitation to turn professional and join the 2nd Division, then chairman Emile Stahl stating that to take the promotion would be "a suicidal adventure which would lead the club to its death."

The club has won the Division d'Honneur, Alsace 8 times (1964, 1965, 1977, 1989, 1993, 1994, 1998 and 2015) and the third level of the French football league system 4 times (1969, 1970, 1981 and 1982).

The club has reached the 1/8th final of the Coupe de France twice (1964 and 1977)

== Season-by-season ==
Year	Level	Division	Position
1997–98	6	Division d'Honneur Alsace	2nd
1998–99	6	Division d'Honneur Alsace	1st
1999–2000	5	Championnat de France Amateur 2 Group B	7th
2000–01	5	Championnat de France Amateur 2 Group C	13th
2001–02	5	Championnat de France Amateur 2 Group C	7th
2002–03	5	Championnat de France Amateur 2 Group C	11th
2003–04	5	Championnat de France Amateur 2 Group C	9th
2004–05	6	Championnat de France Amateur 2 Group B	3rd
2005–06	5	Championnat de France Amateur Group A	15th
2006–07	5	Championnat de France Amateur 2 Group B	5th
2007–08	5	Championnat de France Amateur 2 Group B	7th
2008–09	5	Championnat de France Amateur 2 Group C	11th
2009–10	5	Championnat de France Amateur 2 Group C	12th
2010–11	5	Championnat de France Amateur 2 Group C	15th
2011–12	6	Division d'Honneur Alsace	3rd
2012–13	6	Division d'Honneur Alsace	3rd
2013–14	6	Division d'Honneur Alsace	5th
2014–15	6	Division d'Honneur Alsace	2nd
2015–16	6	Division d'Honneur Alsace	1st
2016–17	5	Championnat de France Amateur 2 Group D	13th
2017–18	6	Regional 1 Alsace	1st

== Honours ==
- French Amateur Champions: 1969, 1970
- Division 3 Champions: 1981, 1982
- Champions of DH Alsace (8): 1964, 1977, 1989, 1993, 1994, 1999, 2016, 2018
- Coupe d'Alsace (10): 1967, 1969, 1977, 1984, 1985, 1986, 1987, 1989, 1995, 2003

== Notable players ==
- (France) Jonathan Clauss
- (Morocco) Samir El Mourabet
- (France) Arsène Wenger
