= Ludovic Saline =

French footballer (born 1989)

Personal information
- Date of birth: 23 March 1989 (age 37)
- Place of birth: Saint-Denis, France
- Height: 1.79 m (5 ft 10 in)
- Position: Midfielder

Team information
- Current team: Beauvais

Youth career
- Torcy
- Lorient

Senior career*
Years	Team	Apps	(Gls)
2009–2010	Concarneau		
2010–2011	Pisa	5	(0)
2011	Concarneau		
2011–2014	Moulins	81	(20)
2014–2015	Lyon-Duchère	25	(4)
2015–2016	Chambly	13	(0)
2016–2017	Concarneau	26	(1)
2017–2018	Schiltigheim	16	(1)
2018–2020	Belfort	38	(5)
2020–	Beauvais	17	(0)
- * Club domestic league appearances and goals as of 21:48, 17 April 2022 (UTC)

Ludovic Saline (born 23 March 1989) is a French professional footballer who plays as a midfielder for Championnat National 1 club Beauvais.

== Career ==
During a spell in Italian football between 2010 and 2011, Saline played five matches in the Lega Pro for Pisa. In july 2018, he joined Belfort.

== Career statistics ==
As of match played 12 March 2022

Appearances and goals by club, season and competition
Club	Season	League			National Cup		Other		Total	
Club	Season	Division	Apps	Goals	Apps	Goals	Apps	Goals	Apps	Goals
Pisa	2010–11	Lega Pro	5	0	0	0	—		5	0
Moulins	2011–12	CFA	22	4	0	0	—		22	4
Moulins	2012–13	CFA	32	5	2	0	—		34	5
Moulins	2013–14	CFA	27	11	4	0	—		31	11
Moulins	Total		81	20	6	0	—		87	20
Lyon-Duchère	2014–15	CFA	25	4	1	1	—		26	5
Chambly	2015–16	National	13	0	2	1	—		15	1
Concarneau	2016–17	National	26	1	0	0	—		26	1
Schiltigheim	2017–18	National 2	16	1	3	1	—		19	2
Belfort	2018–19	National 2	20	4	5	1	—		25	5
Belfort	2019–20	National 2	18	1	1	0	—		19	1
Belfort	Total		38	5	6	1	—		44	6
Beauvais	2020–21	National 2	6	0	1	0	—		7	0
Beauvais	2021–22	National 2	11	0	2	0	—		13	0
Beauvais	Total		17	0	3	0	—		20	0
Career total			221	31	21	4	0	0	242	35
