= Alex Marchadier =

French footballer (born 1998)

Personal information
- Date of birth: 26 September 1998 (age 28)
- Place of birth: Clermont-Ferrand, France
- Height: 1.90 m (6 ft 3 in)
- Position: Defender

Team information
- Current team: Chamalières

Youth career
- 2004–2015: Clermont

Senior career*
Years	Team	Apps	(Gls)
2015–2016	Marseille II	1	(0)
2017–2019	Moulins Yzeure	39	(2)
2019–2021	Orléans II	5	(0)
2019–2021	Orléans	20	(0)
2021–2023	Le Puy	7	(0)
2023–2024	Romorantin	14	(0)
2024–	Chamalières	8	(0)
- * Club domestic league appearances and goals as of 7 December 2024

Alex Marchadier (born 26 September 1998) is a French professional footballer who plays as defender for Championnat National 3 club Chamalières.

== Career ==
Marchadier was a member of the youth academy of Marseille, but left the club in the summer of 2016 after refusing a contrat pro stagiaire (professional trainee contract). He had trials with Benfica and Juventus, but was without a club until signing for Moulins Yzeure Foot in the summer of 2017.

On 12 June 2019, Marchadier signed a three-year contract with Orléans. He made his senior debut with Orléans in a 4–1 Ligue 2 loss to Lens on 7 October 2019.

== Honours ==
Le Puy

- Championnat National 2: 2021–22
