= Cédric Gonçalves =

French footballer (born 1993)

Personal information
- Date of birth: 6 August 1993 (age 33)
- Place of birth: Beaumont, France
- Height: 1.75 m (5 ft 9 in)
- Position: Central midfielder

Team information
- Current team: Cannes
- Number: 6

Senior career*
Years	Team	Apps	(Gls)
2014–2016	Clermont	18	(0)
2017	Saint-Priest	20	(8)
2017–2019	Fréjus Saint-Raphaël	36	(3)
2019–2021	Angoulême	23	(1)
2021–	Cannes	81	(10)
- * Club domestic league appearances and goals as of 30 November 2024

Cédric Gonçalves (born 6 August 1993) is a French professional footballer who plays as a midfielder for Ligue 3 club Cannes.

== Club career ==
Gonçalves made his full professional debut in a 2–1 Ligue 2 defeat against Brest in August 2014, coming on the pitch in the last ten minutes as a substitute for Eugène Ekobo.
