= Vendée Fontenay Foot =

French football club

Fontenay
- Full name: Vendée Fontenay Foot
- Nickname(s): VFF
- Founded: 1991
- Ground: Stade Emmanuel Murzeau; Fontenay-le-Comte
- Capacity: 4,500
- Chairman: Loic Turpeau
- Manager: Philippe Guilloteau
- League: National 3 Group D
- 2022–23: National 3 Group B, 7th
- Website: www.vendee-fontenay-foot.fr
Home colours	Away colours

Vendée Fontenay Foot is a French football club based in Fontenay-le-Comte, Vendée. It was founded in 1991 in a merger of two teams, the Stade Athlétique Fontenaysien and Étoile. The club currently plays in the Championnat National 3, the fifth tier of the French football league system.

== History ==
The club was formed in 1991 from the merger of the Stade Athlétique Fontenaysien and Étoile.

The club played mostly in CFA before being demoted to CFA 2 in 2005 for non-sporting reasons.

At the end of the 2006–07 season the club finished first in its group in CFA 2, allowing it to return in CFA.

Fontenay reached the quarter-finals of the 2000–01 Coupe de France, losing on penalties to Lyon.

== Current squad ==
As of 24 February 2019

Note: Flags indicate national team as defined under FIFA eligibility rules; some limited exceptions apply. Players may hold more than one non-FIFA nationality.

No.	Pos.	Nation	Player
—	GK	(France) FRA	Dimitri Bonnin
—	GK	(France) FRA	Manu Rauturier
—	DF	(France) FRA	Jonas Charpentier
—	DF	(France) FRA	Freddy Colombo
—	DF	(France) FRA	Alexandre Dupas
—	DF	(France) FRA	Clément Godet
—	DF	(France) FRA	Christopher Graffin
—	DF	(France) FRA	Kenny Rauturier
—	MF	(France) FRA	Corentin Artaillou
—	MF	(France) FRA	Keo Balliau
—	MF	(France) FRA	Mohamed Belissaoui
—	MF	(France) FRA	Mathieu Blais

No.	Pos.	Nation	Player
—	MF	(France) FRA	Theo Boisard
—	MF	(France) FRA	Damien Cosset
—	MF	(Mali) MLI	Mahamadou Niakaté
—	MF	(France) FRA	Emilien Orveau
—	MF	(France) FRA	Cédric Tangatchy
—	MF	(Morocco) MAR	Mohamed Hamzaoui
—	FW	(France) FRA	Rémi Bonaventure
—	FW	(France) FRA	Thimothée Ferand
—	FW	(France) FRA	Martin Garot
—	FW	(France) FRA	Yassine Latifeddine
—	FW	(France) FRA	Vincent Ugarte
