= ASM Belfort =

French football club

- Full name: Association Sportive Municipale Belfortaine Football Club
- Founded: 1947 as ASP Belfort
- Ground: Stade Serzian, Belfort
- Capacity: 5,500
- Chairman: Jean-Paul Simon
- Manager: Maurice Goldman
- League: National 3 Group I
- 2022–23: National 2 Group B, 13th (relegated)
- Website: www.asmbelfortfoot.com

Association Sportive Municipale Belfortaine Football Club is a French association football team from Belfort, Franche-Comté, currently playing in the Championnat National 3, the fifth tier in the French football league system.

== History ==
The club was founded in 1947 as Association Sportive des Patronages Belfortains and was renamed ASM Belfort 1971 after the merger with US Belfort. The club plays its home matches at the Stade Serzian in Belfort.

== Current squad ==
As of 5 October 2018

Note: Flags indicate national team as defined under FIFA eligibility rules; some limited exceptions apply. Players may hold more than one non-FIFA nationality.

No.	Pos.	Nation	Player
—	GK	FRA	Jean N'Djalkonog
—	GK	FRA	Adrien Lheritier
—	GK	FRA	Eddy Ehlinger
—	DF	FRA	Andy Cizo
—	DF	FRA	Guillaume Arisi
—	DF	FRA	Thomas Manzinali
—	DF	FRA	Yannick Konki
—	DF	FRA	Nasser Tahiri
—	DF	FRA	Hendricks Romain
—	DF	FRA	Mathias Moltenis
—	DF	FRA	Jordan Perrony
—	MF	FRA	Benoît Barros

No.	Pos.	Nation	Player
—	MF	FRA	Jason Ranneaud
—	MF	FRA	Bilel Badre
—	MF	FRA	Guerlain Bentabet
—	MF	FRA	Mathieu Leroux
—	MF	FRA	Lucas Brenet
—	MF	FRA	Jeremy Gaag
—	MF	COM	Youssouf Ahamadi
—	FW	FRA	Thomas Régnier
—	FW	FRA	Sofiane Bekkouche
—	FW	FRA	Ludovic Saline
—	FW	FRA	Sofiane Aber
—	FW	FRA	Esli Mukendi
