= Martin Garot =

French footballer (born 1988)

Personal information
- Date of birth: 21 March 1988 (age 38)
- Place of birth: Le Mans, France
- Height: 1.83 m (6 ft 0 in)
- Position: Attacking midfielder

Senior career*
Years	Team	Apps	(Gls)
2006–2010	Laval B	85	(29)
2008–2010	Laval	12	(1)
2010–2011	La Vitréenne	29	(11)
2011–2012	Les Herbiers	28	(3)
2012–2020	Fontenay	190	(48)
2020–2023	Les Sables FC Olonne-Château		
- * Club domestic league appearances and goals

Martin Garot (French: [maʁtɛ̃ ɡaʁo]; born 21 March 1988) is a French former professional footballer who played as an attacking midfielder.
