= Noyalo =

Commune in Morbihan, France

Noyalo Noaloù
- Part of Theix-Noyalo
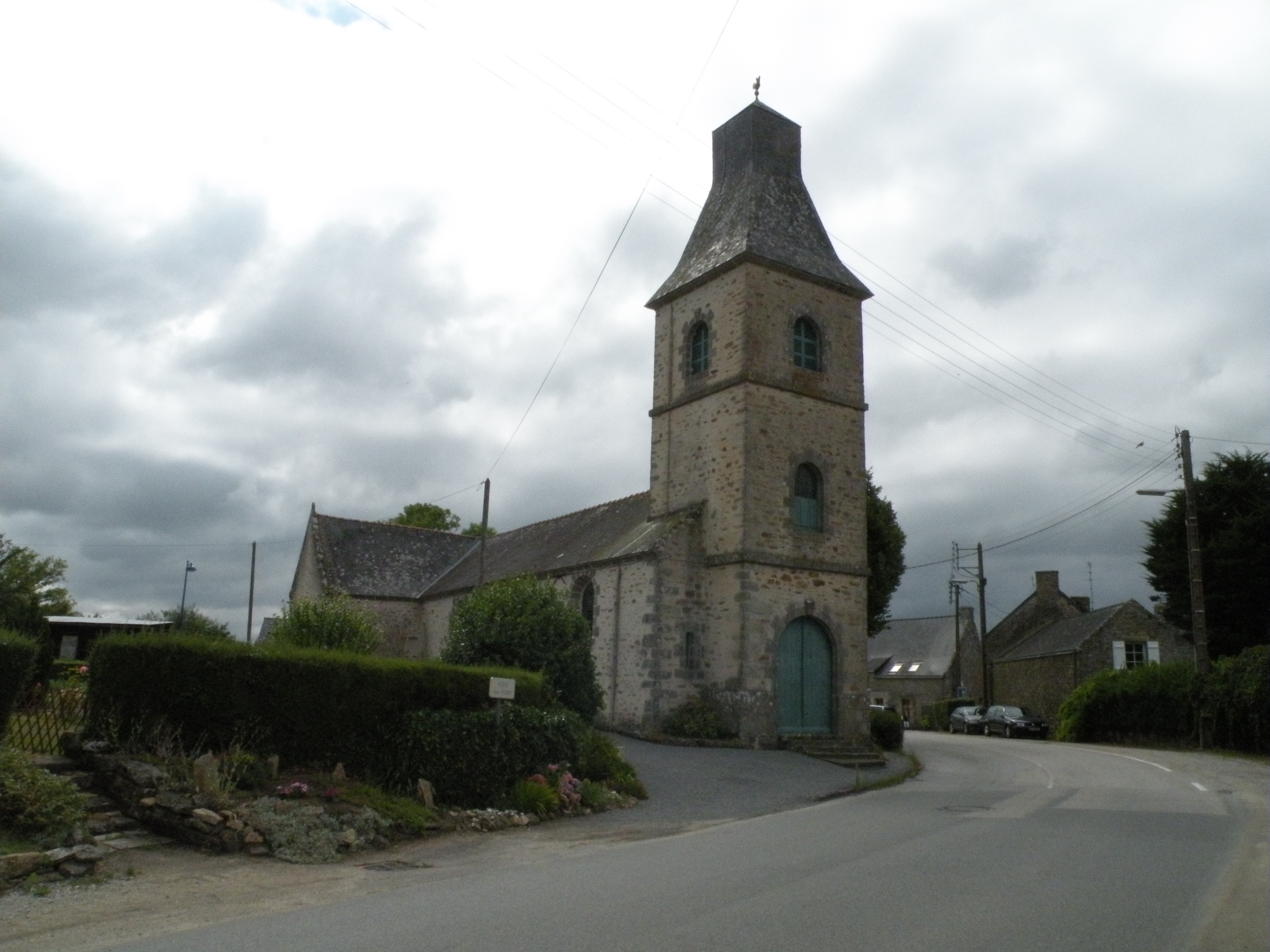
- The church in Noyalo

- Coat of arms
- Location of Noyalo
- Location within France Location within Brittany
- Coordinates: 47°36′40″N 2°40′47″W
- Country: France
- Region: Brittany
- Department: Morbihan
- Arrondissement: Vannes
- Canton: Sené
- Commune: Theix-Noyalo
- Area^{1}: 4.93 km^{2} (1.90 sq mi)
- Highest elevation: 22 m (72 ft)
- Lowest elevation: 0 m (0 ft)
- Population (2021): 930
  - Density: 190/km^{2} (490/sq mi)
- Time zone: UTC+01:00 (CET)
  - Summer (DST): UTC+02:00 (CEST)
- Postal code: 56450
- ^{1} French Land Register data, which excludes lakes, ponds, glaciers > 1 km^{2} (0.386 sq mi or 247 acres) and river estuaries.

Noyalo (French pronunciation: [nwajalo]; Breton: Noaloù) is a former commune in the Morbihan department of Brittany in north-western France. On 1 January 2016, it was merged into the new commune Theix-Noyalo. Its population was 930 in 2021. Inhabitants of Noyalo are called in French Noyalais.

== See also ==
- Communes of the Morbihan department
