= Theix =

Commune in Morbihan, France

Theix Teiz
- Part of Theix-Noyalo
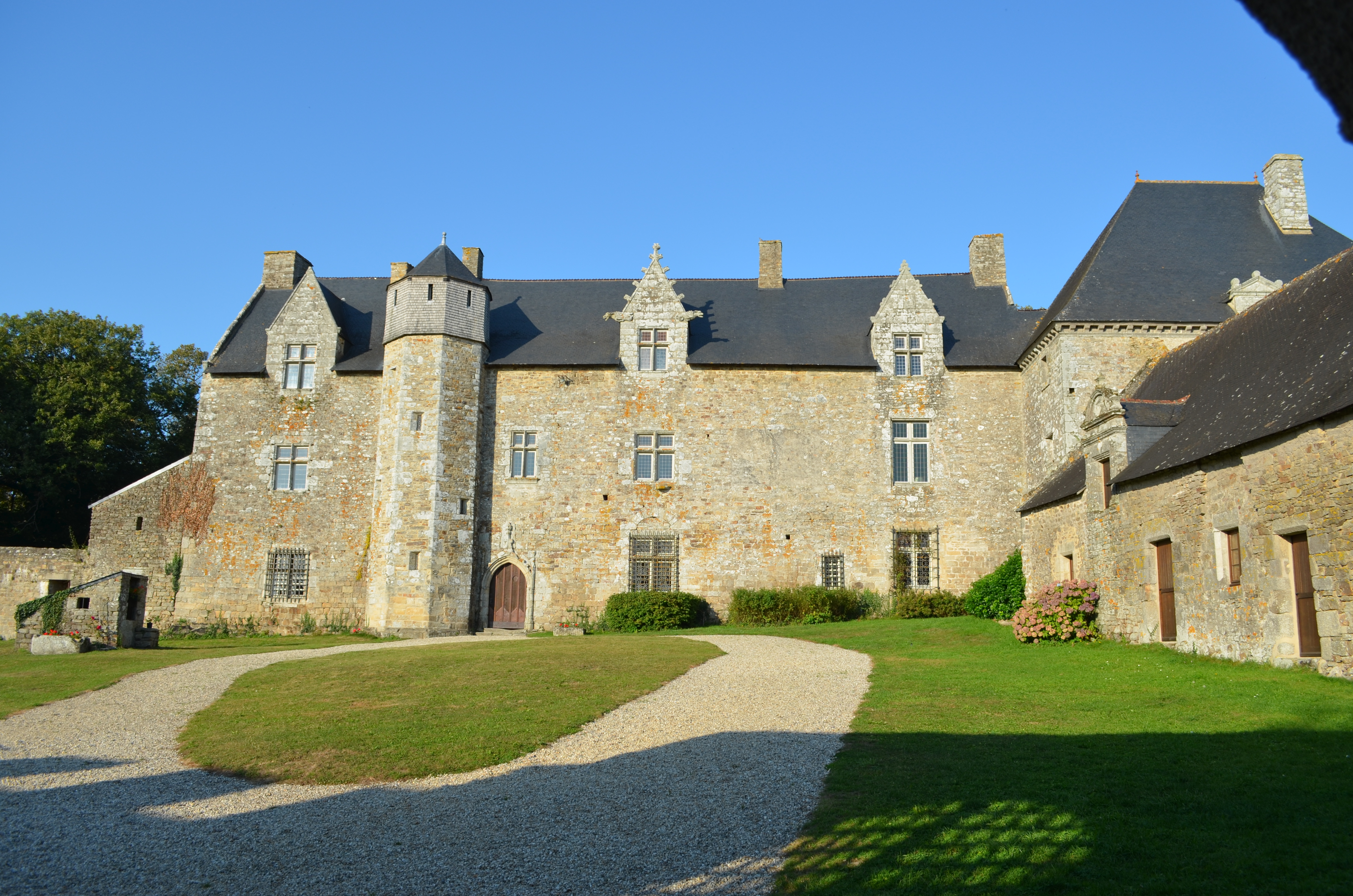
- The Château of Plessis-Josso, in Theix

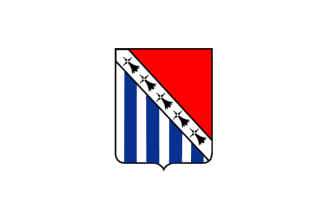
- Flag Coat of arms
- Location of Theix
- Location within France Location within Brittany
- Coordinates: 47°37′47″N 2°39′17″W
- Country: France
- Region: Brittany
- Department: Morbihan
- Arrondissement: Vannes
- Canton: Sené
- Commune: Theix-Noyalo
- Area^{1}: 47.13 km^{2} (18.20 sq mi)
- Highest elevation: 25 m (82 ft)
- Lowest elevation: 2 m (6.6 ft)
- Population (2013): 6,946
  - Density: 147.4/km^{2} (381.7/sq mi)
- Time zone: UTC+01:00 (CET)
  - Summer (DST): UTC+02:00 (CEST)
- Postal code: 56450
- ^{1} French Land Register data, which excludes lakes, ponds, glaciers > 1 km^{2} (0.386 sq mi or 247 acres) and river estuaries.

Theix (French pronunciation: [tɛks]; Breton: Teiz) is a former commune in the Morbihan department of Brittany in north-western France. On 1 January 2016, it was merged into the new commune Theix-Noyalo. Inhabitants of Theix are called in French Theixois.

== Breton language ==
In 2008, there was 25,37% of the children attended the bilingual schools in primary education.

== Sightseeing ==
- Château du Plessis-Josso, a well-preserved 15th century fortified manor-house.

== See also ==
- Communes of the Morbihan department
