= Theix-Noyalo =

- Commune
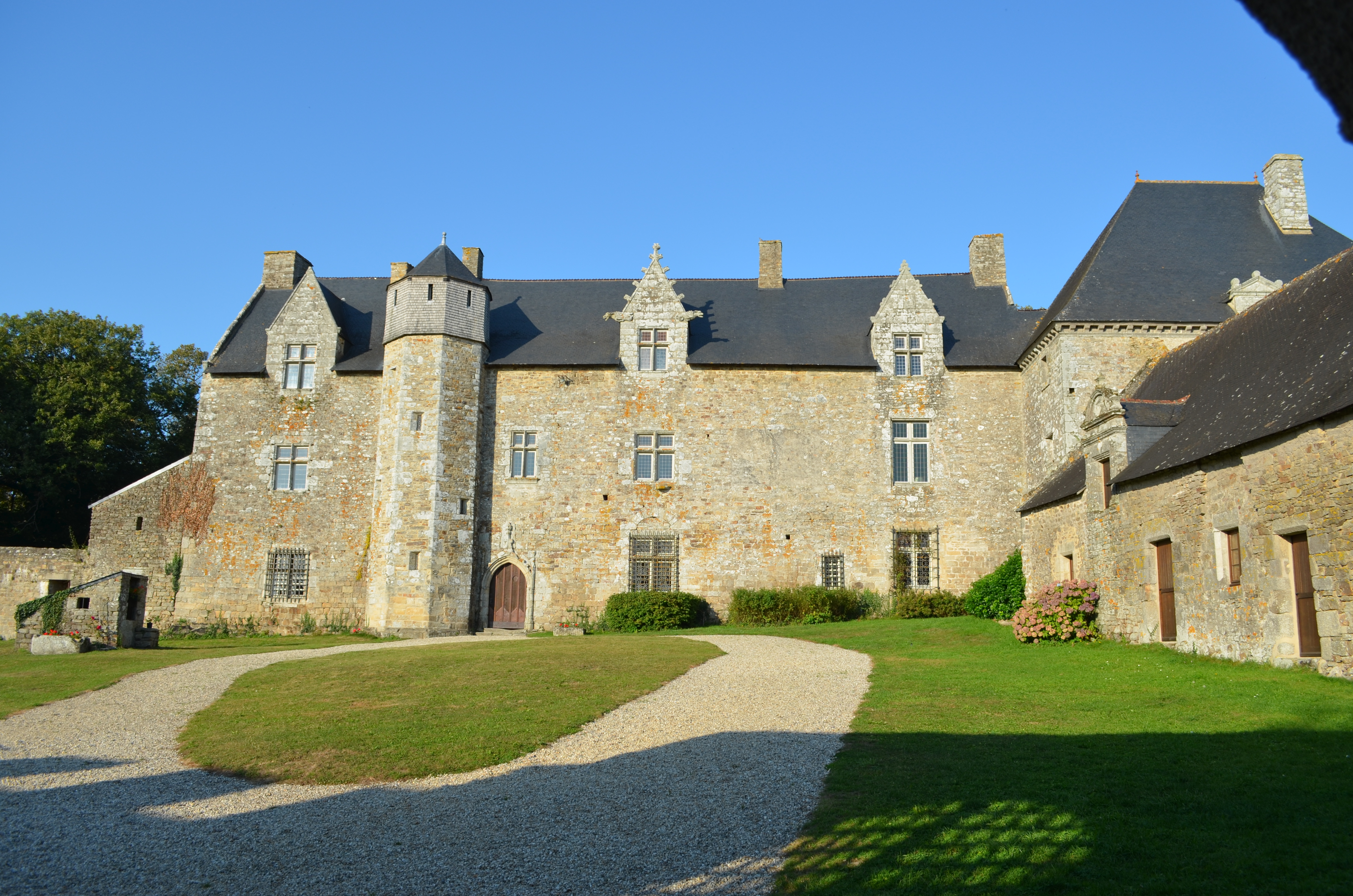
- The chateau of Le Plessis-Josso, in Theix
- Location of Theix-Noyalo
- Location within France Location within Brittany
- Coordinates: 47°37′44″N 2°38′56″W
- Country: France
- Region: Brittany
- Department: Morbihan
- Arrondissement: Vannes
- Canton: Séné
- Intercommunality: Golfe du Morbihan - Vannes Agglomération

Government
  - Mayor (2026–32): Christian Sébille
- Area^{1}: 52.06 km^{2} (20.10 sq mi)
- Population (2023): 8,500
  - Density: 160/km^{2} (420/sq mi)
- Time zone: UTC+01:00 (CET)
  - Summer (DST): UTC+02:00 (CEST)
- INSEE/Postal code: 56251 /56450
- ^{1} French Land Register data, which excludes lakes, ponds, glaciers > 1 km^{2} (0.386 sq mi or 247 acres) and river estuaries.

Theix-Noyalo (French pronunciation: [tɛks nwajalo]; Breton: Teiz-Noaloù) is a commune in the Morbihan department of western France. Theix is the municipal seat. The municipality was established on 1 January 2016 and consists of the former communes of Theix and Noyalo.

== Population ==
The population data given in the table below refer to the commune in its geography as of January 2025.

Historical population
Year	Pop.	±% p.a.
1968	2,143	—
1975	2,545	+2.49%
1982	3,993	+6.65%
1990	5,028	+2.92%
1999	5,695	+1.39%
2007	7,517	+3.53%
2012	7,662	+0.38%
2017	7,966	+0.78%
2023	8,500	+1.09%
Source: INSEE

== See also ==
- Communes of the Morbihan department
