= Château du Plessis-Josso =

Château in Theix, Brittany, France

Coordinates: 47°37′47″N 2°35′40″W

The Château du Plessis-Josso is a fortified 14th century manor house in the Morbihan département of France. The manor is located in the town of Theix, near Vannes. The manor-house is open for tours during the summer, and offers its main hall for hosting events and marriages as well as a small country cottage outside the enclosing walls.

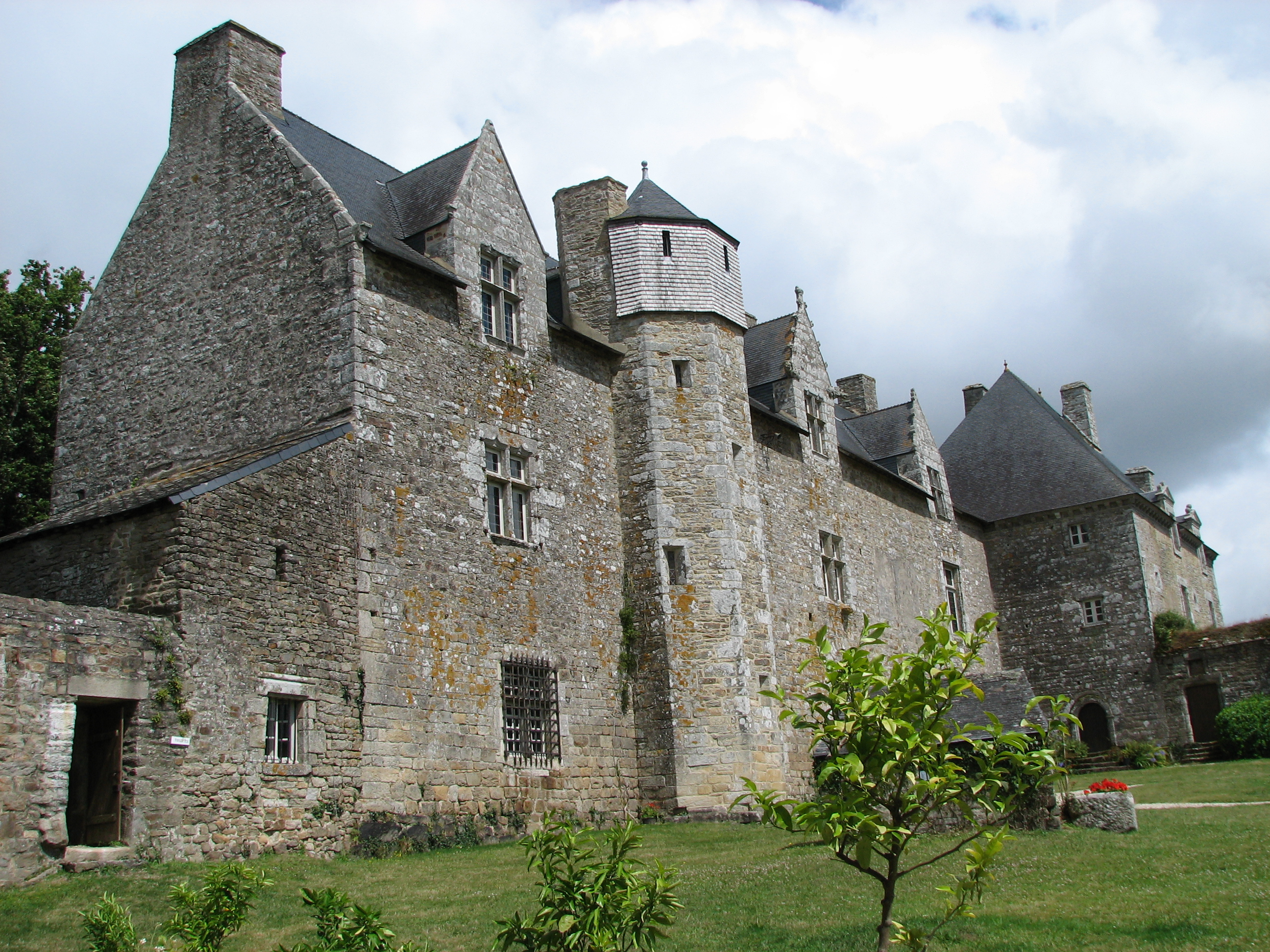
Castle of Plessis-Josso

== History ==
Well-preserved and partially inhabited, the manor-house stands next to a large pond. This feudal Breton ensemble still has its fortified enceinte with towers and crenellated walls that protected it from the armed gangs and pillagers who were operating in the region during the Hundred Years' War and later during the Wars of Religion of the 16th century.

Built around 1330 by Sylvestre Josso, squire of the Duke Jean III during the turbulent period of the Breton War of Succession in the 14th century, it passed next by a powerful alliance to the Rosmadec family and served as a residence for dignitaries such as a bishop, sénéchaux and the governors of various Breton towns. In the late 18th century it became the property of the Le Mintier de Léhélec family who still live there today.

Plessis-Josso, like all 15th century manors in Brittany, had especially an agricultural function as the head of a domaine of 1,500 hectares spread over several parishes and with a population of nearly 500 inhabitants. It had several mills, baker's ovens, a chapel and a small private port in the Gulf of Morbihan. Its role was therefore political, economic and administrative.

== Architecture ==
This medieval site is composed of several sections of varying architectural styles and eras: the main corps de logis dating from the 15th century with its Gothic dormer windows, a 16th-century Renaissance pavilion, Classical 17th century outbuildings, and a complete enclosing wall whose corner tower (tour d’angle) defended the access road that spans the causeway, between the lake and the mill.

The ground-floor hall has a very beautiful example of a crédence de justice (wall-cupboard built directly into the stone wall) that was used by the lord of the manor to place books and documents relating to the administration of the manor-court.

== See also ==
- List of castles in France
- Manor house
