= 2018–19 Coupe de France preliminary rounds, Centre-Val de Loire =

The 2018–19 Coupe de France preliminary rounds, Centre-Val de Loire was the qualifying competition to decide which teams from the leagues of the Centre-Val de Loire region of France took part in the main competition from the seventh round.

== Preliminary rounds ==
These matches were played on 25 and 26 August 2018.

Preliminary round results: Centre-Val de Loire
Tie no	Home team (tier)	Score	Away team (tier)
1.	US Belhomert (11)	1–4	FC Rémois (9)
2.	EE Pithiviers-le-Veil-Dadonville (11)	1–7	AS Ste Gemme-Moronval (9)
3.	FC Bû (12)	2–1	AS Villemeux-sur-Eure (10)
4.	AS Anet (11)	0–3 (Note: Tie won by forfeit.)	CEP La Ferté-Vidame (9)
5.	FC Lèves (11)	1–2 (Note: FC Lèves penalised for fielding a suspended player. ES Maintenon-Pierres qualify. Original scoreline 1–2.)	ES Maintenon-Pierres (9)
6.	Avenir Amilly-Cintray (11)	0–3	Orléans Métropole Académie (11)
7.	Stade Loupéen (11)	4–4 (4–5 p)	USS Portugais Orléans (11)
8.	CJF Fleury-les-Aubrais (9)	9–2	AS Châteauneuf-en-Thymerais (9)
9.	MSD Chartres (11)	9–3	CS Angerville-Pussay (10)
10.	FC Lucé Ouest (10)	3–1	CD Espagnol Orléans (11)
11.	FC Haut Vendômois (11)	3–0	ES Jouy-St Prest (10)
12.	AS Baccon-Huisseau (10)	6–0	CAN Portugais Chartres (9)
13.	FC Lutz-en-Dunois (11)	1–2	AS Suèvres (11)
14.	ES Azé Thoré Lunay (10)	1–6	UP Illiers-Combray (10)
15.	Avenir St Amand-Longpré (9)	0–1	Etoile Brou (9)
16.	US Vallée du Loir (10)	4–2	US Selommes (9)
17.	Entente Bauloise (12)	1–3	ASL Orchaise (10)
18.	FC Magdunois (9)	1–3	ES Villebarou (9)
19.	AS Cléry-St André (11)	1–0	CA St Laurent-Nouan (10)
20.	Jargeau-St Denis FC (10)	8–2	St Denis-en-Val FC (11)
21.	US Lorris (11)	1–3	FC Mandorais (9)
22.	ES Marigny 45 (10)	9–0	AS Corbeilles (11)
23.	Santranges FC (9)	1–1 (3–4 p)	CL Bonny (10)
24.	US Briare (11)	1–4	ES Aubigny (9)
25.	US St Cyr-en-Val (12)	2–3	US Henrichemont-Menetou-Salon (9)
26.	FC Coullons-Cerdon (11)	0–3	COS Marcilly-en-Villette (9)
27.	AS Isdes-Vannes-Villemurlin-Viglain (13)	0–3	SL Chaillot Vierzon (10)
28.	US Poilly-Autry (10)	1–4	FC Fussy-St Martin-Vigneux (9)
29.	US St Aignan/Noyers (11)	2–2 (4–2 p)	SC Vatan (9)
30.	Liniez AC (11)	1–3 (a.e.t.)	JS Cormeray (11)
31.	US Pouillé-Mareuil (12)	0–2	SA Issoudun (8)
32.	AJ St Romanaise (11)	2–4	Olympique Mehunois (9)
33.	ES Villefranche-sur-Cher (10)	1–1 (5–4 p)	AS Chabris (10)
34.	US Reuilly (9)	0–4	Olympique Portugais Mehun-sur-Yèvre (9)
35.	ASIE du Cher (11)	0–2	USC Châtres-Langon-Mennetou (10)
36.	US St Florent-sur-Cher (10)	8–4	AS Soulangis (11)
37.	AC Villers-les-Ormes (9)	1–1 (3–5 p)	USA Lury-Méreau (9)
38.	AS Chapelloise (10)	0–1	US Montierchaume (10)
39.	JAS Moulins-sur-Céphons (11)	3–3 (6–7 p)	Olympique Morthomiers (11)
40.	FC Levroux (9)	3–1	FC Avord (10)
41.	AS Chalivoy-Milon (12)	1–3 (a.e.t.)	FR Velles (10)
42.	ES Sancoins (10)	2–1 (a.e.t.)	ES Étrechet (10)
43.	ES St Plantaire-Cuzion-Orsennes (11)	0–2	ECF Bouzanne Vallée Noire (9)
44.	US Dun-sur-Auron (10)	0–3	US Aigurande (10)
45.	FC Le Châtelet-Culan (12)	0–3	US Le Pêchereau (10)
46.	Espoire Pont-Chrétien-Chabenet (11)	1–4	AS Ingrandes (11)
47.	US Charenton-du-Cher (11)	3–2	SS Cluis (11)
48.	FC de la Marche Occitane (10)	1–0	Avenir Lignières (10)
49.	RC Val Sud Touraine (12)	0–9	ACS Buzançais (9)
50.	AS Nazelles-Négron (12)	2–6	FC Etoile Verte (10)
51.	US Le Blanc (9)	2–3 (a.e.t.)	FC St Maure-Maillé (10)
52.	ES Vineuil-Brion (10)	3–0	AS Aubrière (11)
53.	ES St Benoît-la-Forêt (11)	0–7	ES Bourgueil (10)
54.	FC Beaumont-en-Véron (10)	6–2	US Brenne Vendœuvres (9)
55.	CS Tourangeau Veigné (10)	8–1	US Argy (11)
56.	SLO Mazières-de-Touraine (12)	2–8	AS Esvres (11)
57.	AS Pays de Racan (10)	1–3	FC Lamembrolle-Mettray (10)
58.	AS Villedômer (10)	3–1	AS Chailles-Candé 99 (10)
59.	US Monnaie (10)	3–1	AS St Gervais (10)
60.	US Pernay (11)	2–2 (6–5 p)	Avionnette Parçay-Meslay FC (10)

== First round ==
These matches were played on 25 and 26 August and 2 September 2018.

First round results: Centre-Val de Loire
Tie no	Home team (tier)	Score	Away team (tier)
1.	SC Malesherbes (9)	4–0	ACSF Dreux (8)
2.	SMOC St Jean-de-Braye (7)	4–2 (a.e.t.)	ES Nogent-le-Roi (8)
3.	USM Olivet (7)	2–1 (a.e.t.)	CS Mainvilliers (8)
4.	Amicale Gallardon (10)	1–3	FCM Ingré (8)
5.	Amicale Épernon (7)	3–0 (Note: Tie won by forfeit.)	US Beaune-la-Rolande (8)
6.	Neuville Sports (9)	3–0 (Note: Amicale de Lucé penalised for fielding a suspended player. Neuville Sports qualify. Original scoreline 3–3 (2–3 p).)	Amicale de Lucé (8)
7.	FJ Champhol (10)	3–0 (Note: AS Tout Horizon Dreux penalised for fielding a suspended player. FJ Champhol qualify. Original scoreline 1–2.)	AS Tout Horizon Dreux (8)
8.	FC St Georges-sur-Eure (7)	1–1 (5–6 p)	Avenir Ymonville (8)
9.	FCO Saint-Jean-de-la-Ruelle (10)	3–7	Dammarie Foot Bois-Gueslin (7)
10.	Amicale Sours (8)	0–1	Luisant AC (7)
11.	CA Ouzouer-le-Marché (8)	2–0	US Vendôme (9)
12.	ES Chaingy-St Ay (9)	0–4	US Mer (8)
13.	ASJ La Chaussée-St-Victor (8)	4–0	CS Lusitanos Beaugency (9)
14.	US Beaugency Val-de-Loire (7)	6–0	ESCALE Orléans (8)
15.	FC Boigny-sur-Bionne (9)	1–2 (a.e.t.)	CSM Sully-sur-Loire (7)
16.	Diables Rouges Selles-St Denis (9)	3–0	SC Massay (8)
17.	AS Nouan-Lamotte (10)	0–1	US Dampierre-en-Burly (8)
18.	ES Nancray-Chambon-Nibelle (8)	2–1 (a.e.t.)	ES Gâtinaise (7)
19.	US La-Ferté-St Aubin (10)	1–5	CS Vignoux-sur-Barangeon (8)
20.	ES Trouy (9)	2–0	US Le Poinçonnet (8)
21.	AS St Gaultier-Thenay (9)	1–2	SC Châteauneuf-sur-Cher (10)
22.	Gazelec Bourges (8)	2–3 (a.e.t.)	FC Diors (8)
23.	US Billy (9)	2–4	US St Maur (8)
24.	US Sancerre (10)	2–3 (a.e.t.)	ES Moulon Bourges (7)
25.	Etoile Châteauroux (10)	0–3 (Note: Etoile Châteauroux penalised for fielding a suspended player. AS Orval qualify. Original scoreline 0–1.)	AS Orval (8)
26.	US Villedieu-sur-Indre (9)	2–2 (3–5 p)	AS St Germain-du-Puy (8)
27.	EGC Touvent Châteauroux (9)	2–1	AC Parnac Val d'Abloux (8)
28.	US La Châtre (8)	2–4	FC St Doulchard (7)
29.	ES Poulaines (10)	1–0 (a.e.t.)	CA Montrichard (8)
30.	US Argenton-sur-Creuse (9)	5–3	US Montgivray (8)
31.	FC Berry Touraine (11)	3–0 (Note: Loches AC penalised for fielding a suspended player. FC Berry Touraine qualify. Original scoreline 3–2.)	Loches AC (10)
32.	FC Bléré Val de Cher (9)	1–1 (3–2 p)	US Selles-sur-Cher (8)
33.	ES La Ville-aux-Dames (8)	1–3	AFC Blois (8)
34.	ASC Portugais Blois (9)	0–5	US Chambray-lès-Tours (7)
35.	US Renaudine (8)	2–1	US Saint-Pierre-des-Corps (7)
36.	US Yzeures-Preuilly (10)	1–1 (2–3 p)	Le Richelais (8)
37.	FC Veretz-Azay-Larçay (10)	1–2	Racing La Riche-Tours (8)
38.	AS Fondettes (10)	5–0	AS Chouzy-Onzain (8)
39.	ES Oésienne (9)	0–4	AC Amboise (9)
40.	AS Monts (8)	5–0	US Chitenay-Cellettes (8)
41.	ES Vallée Verte (10)	0–2	St Georges Descartes (8)
42.	CCSP Tours (9)	0–3 (Note: CCSP Tours penalised for fielding a suspended player. Joué-lès-Tours FCT qualify. Original scoreline 1–3.)	Joué-lès-Tours FCT (8)
43.	SC Azay-Cheillé (7)	1–5	Langeais Cinq-Mars Foot (8)
44.	CEP La Ferté-Vidame (9)	9–3	FC Rémois (9)
45.	FC Bû (12)	0–4 (Note: Tie switched at the request of both clubs.)	AS Ste Gemme-Moronval (9)
46.	ES Maintenon-Pierres (9)	1–2	CJF Fleury-les-Aubrais (9)
47.	USS Portugais Orléans (11)	2–1	Orléans Métropole Académie (11)
48.	AS Baccon-Huisseau (10)	11–0	FC Haut Vendômois (11)
49.	FC Lucé Ouest (10)	2–5	MSD Chartres (11)
50.	AS Suèvres (11)	1–4	UP Illiers-Combray (10)
51.	Etoile Brou (9)	3–2	US Vallée du Loir (10)
52.	ASL Orchaise (10)	2–0	Jargeau-St Denis FC (10)
53.	AS Cléry-St André (11)	2–1	ES Villebarou (9)
54.	FC Mandorais (9)	3–2 (a.e.t.)	CL Bonny (10)
55.	ES Aubigny (9)	5–0	ES Marigny 45 (10)
56.	SL Chaillot Vierzon (10)	2–1 (a.e.t.)	COS Marcilly-en-Villette (9)
57.	US Henrichemont-Menetou-Salon (9)	1–5	FC Fussy-St Martin-Vigneux (9)
58.	SA Issoudun (8)	4–1	Olympique Mehunois (9)
59.	JS Cormeray (11)	0–4	US St Aignan/Noyers (11)
60.	ES Villefranche-sur-Cher (10)	1–2	US St Florent-sur-Cher (10)
61.	Olympique Portugais Mehun-sur-Yèvre (9)	3–1	USC Châtres-Langon-Mennetou (10)
62.	FC Levroux (9)	2–1 (a.e.t.)	US Montierchaume (10)
63.	Olympique Morthomiers (11)	2–2 (2–4 p)	USA Lury-Méreau (9)
64.	ECF Bouzanne Vallée Noire (9)	2–1	US Aigurande (10)
65.	FR Velles (10)	4–0	ES Sancoins (10)
66.	AS Ingrandes (11)	2–1	US Charenton-du-Cher (11)
67.	US Le Pêchereau (10)	0–1 (a.e.t.)	FC de la Marche Occitane (10)
68.	FC Etoile Verte (10)	8–0	ES Vineuil-Brion (10)
69.	ACS Buzançais (9)	2–3	FC St Maure-Maillé (10)
70.	AS Esvres (11)	1–2	ES Bourgueil (10)
71.	FC Beaumont-en-Véron (10)	0–0 (2–3 p)	CS Tourangeau Veigné (10)
72.	US Pernay (11)	1–0	AS Villedômer (10)
73.	FC Lamembrolle-Mettray (10)	3–1 (a.e.t.)	US Monnaie (10)

== Second round ==
These matches were played on 1, 2 and 9 September 2018.

Second round results: Centre-Val de Loire
Tie no	Home team (tier)	Score	Away team (tier)
1.	US Chambray-lès-Tours (7)	1–2	Joué-lès-Tours FCT (8)
2.	ES Trouy (9)	1–4	AS St Amandoise (6)
3.	AS St Germain-du-Puy (8)	4–1	US St Maur (8)
4.	SC Châteauneuf-sur-Cher (10)	0–4	US Argenton-sur-Creuse (9)
5.	FC Diors (8)	0–4	FC Déolois (6)
6.	EGC Touvent Châteauroux (9)	4–5 (a.e.t.)	FC St Doulchard (7)
7.	Langeais Cinq-Mars Foot (8)	2–1	St Georges Descartes (8)
8.	AS Fondettes (10)	1–1 (2–4 p)	FC Bléré Val de Cher (9)
9.	FC Berry Touraine (11)	0–3	AS Monts (8)
10.	ES Poulaines (10)	2–3 (a.e.t.)	AFC Blois (8)
11.	Le Richelais (8)	1–2 (a.e.t.)	Étoile Bleue Saint-Cyr-sur-Loire (6)
12.	AC Amboise (9)	2–0	Racing La Riche-Tours (8)
13.	US Renaudine (8)	0–1	US Portugaise Joué-lès-Tours (6)
14.	AS Orval (8)	2–4	ES Moulon Bourges (7)
15.	Diables Rouges Selles-St Denis (9)	3–5	AS Portugais Bourges (6)
16.	Avenir Ymonville (8)	0–4	USM Saran (6)
17.	SC Malesherbes (9)	1–2 (a.e.t.)	Dammarie Foot Bois-Gueslin (7)
18.	USM Olivet (7)	2–3	FC Drouais (6)
19.	Luisant AC (7)	1–1 (3–4 p)	SMOC St Jean-de-Braye (7)
20.	FJ Champhol (10)	0–1	Amicale Épernon (7)
21.	FCM Ingré (8)	3–2	OC Châteaudun (6)
22.	Neuville Sports (9)	0–1	CA Pithiviers (6)
23.	US Mer (8)	1–0	CA Ouzouer-le-Marché (8)
24.	Vineuil SF (6)	3–1	US Beaugency Val-de-Loire (7)
25.	CSM Sully-sur-Loire (7)	4–1	ES Nancray-Chambon-Nibelle (8)
26.	ASJ La Chaussée-St-Victor (8)	0–3	AS Contres (6)
27.	US Dampierre-en-Burly (8)	2–2 (4–3 p)	CS Vignoux-sur-Barangeon (8)
28.	US St Florent-sur-Cher (10)	0–2	Olympique Portugais Mehun-sur-Yèvre (9)
29.	USA Lury-Méreau (9)	2–3 (a.e.t.)	FC Levroux (9)
30.	ECF Bouzanne Vallée Noire (9)	3–1 (a.e.t.)	FR Velles (10)
31.	FC de la Marche Occitane (10)	3–1	AS Ingrandes (11)
32.	FC St Maure-Maillé (10)	0–3	FC Etoile Verte (10)
33.	CS Tourangeau Veigné (10)	0–2	ES Bourgueil (10)
34.	US St Aignan/Noyers (11)	3–4 (a.e.t.)	SA Issoudun (8)
35.	FC Fussy-St Martin-Vigneux (9)	2–0	SL Chaillot Vierzon (10)
36.	FC Mandorais (9)	4–1	ES Aubigny (9)
37.	ASL Orchaise (10)	1–0	AS Cléry-St André (11)
38.	UP Illiers-Combray (10)	2–0	Etoile Brou (9)
39.	MSD Chartres (11)	2–2 (4–2 p)	AS Baccon-Huisseau (10)
40.	USS Portugais Orléans (11)	3–5	CJF Fleury-les-Aubrais (9)
41.	AS Ste Gemme-Moronval (9)	3–1 (a.e.t.)	CEP La Ferté-Vidame (9)
42.	US Pernay (11)	1–0	FC Lamembrolle-Mettray (10)

== Third round ==
These matches were played on 15 and 16 September 2018.

Third round results: Centre-Val de Loire
Tie no	Home team (tier)	Score	Away team (tier)
1.	CJF Fleury-les-Aubrais (9)	0–3	USM Montargis (5)
2.	FC Déolois (6)	0–2	AS Montlouis-sur-Loire (5)
3.	US Mer (8)	1–4	Vineuil SF (6)
4.	FC de la Marche Occitane (10)	1–2	Joué-lès-Tours FCT (8)
5.	FC Levroux (9)	1–6	Bourges Foot (5)
6.	Olympique Portugais Mehun-sur-Yèvre (9)	0–3	Avoine OCC (5)
7.	FC Bléré Val de Cher (9)	0–3	AS St Germain-du-Puy (8)
8.	US Argenton-sur-Creuse (9)	1–2	ECF Bouzanne Vallée Noire (9)
9.	FC Fussy-St Martin-Vigneux (9)	3–2	Langeais Cinq-Mars Foot (8)
10.	FC Etoile Verte (10)	1–2	SA Issoudun (8)
11.	AS Contres (6)	2–3	FC Ouest Tourangeau (5)
12.	AS Monts (8)	0–2	US Portugaise Joué-lès-Tours (6)
13.	Bourges 18 (5)	3–0	AS Portugais Bourges (6)
14.	ES Bourgueil (10)	2–1	AS St Amandoise (6)
15.	AC Amboise (9)	2–1	ASL Orchaise (10)
16.	Vierzon FC (5)	3–1 (a.e.t.)	USM Saran (6)
17.	FC Drouais (6)	0–0 (3–4 p)	Étoile Bleue Saint-Cyr-sur-Loire (6)
18.	CSM Sully-sur-Loire (7)	3–1 (Note: Tie switched at the request of both clubs.)	MSD Chartres (11)
19.	US Pernay (11)	0–2	J3S Amilly (5)
20.	Amicale Épernon (7)	0–1	FC Saint-Jean-le-Blanc (5)
21.	SMOC St Jean-de-Braye (7)	0–4	FCM Ingré (8)
22.	US Dampierre-en-Burly (8)	3–2	AS Ste Gemme-Moronval (9)
23.	CA Pithiviers (6)	0–1	Dammarie Foot Bois-Gueslin (7)
24.	FC Mandorais (9)	0–1	UP Illiers-Combray (10)
25.	AFC Blois (8)	0–2	US Châteauneuf-sur-Loire (5)
26.	ES Moulon Bourges (7)	3–1	FC St Doulchard (7)

== Fourth round ==
These matches were played on 29 and 30 September 2018.

Fourth round results: Centre-Val de Loire
Tie no	Home team (tier)	Score	Away team (tier)
1.	J3S Amilly (5)	0–4	SO Romorantin (4)
2.	ES Bourgueil (10)	0–3	Bourges Foot (5)
3.	C'Chartres Football (4)	0–2	Saint-Pryvé Saint-Hilaire FC (4)
4.	FCM Ingré (8)	0–4	Bourges 18 (5)
5.	US Dampierre-en-Burly (8)	0–8	Avoine OCC (5)
6.	FC Ouest Tourangeau (5)	1–0	US Portugaise Joué-lès-Tours (6)
7.	UP Illiers-Combray (10)	2–4 (a.e.t.)	AC Amboise (9)
8.	SA Issoudun (8)	1–0	FC Saint-Jean-le-Blanc (5)
9.	AS Montlouis-sur-Loire (5)	2–0	Vierzon FC (5)
10.	ECF Bouzanne Vallée Noire (9)	2–3	ES Moulon Bourges (7)
11.	CSM Sully-sur-Loire (7)	1–0	USM Montargis (5)
12.	Étoile Bleue Saint-Cyr-sur-Loire (6)	0–4	Blois Football 41 (4)
13.	FC Fussy-St Martin-Vigneux (9)	0–2	US Châteauneuf-sur-Loire (5)
14.	Joué-lès-Tours FCT (8)	2–1	AS St Germain-du-Puy (8)
15.	Dammarie Foot Bois-Gueslin (7)	1–4	Vineuil SF (6)

== Fifth round ==
These matches were played on 13 and 14 October 2018.

Fifth round results: Centre-Val de Loire
Tie no	Home team (tier)	Score	Away team (tier)
1.	CSM Sully-sur-Loire (7)	0–2	Saint-Pryvé Saint-Hilaire FC (4)
2.	SA Issoudun (8)	1–2 (a.e.t.)	Vineuil SF (6)
3.	Blois Football 41 (4)	5–0	FC Ouest Tourangeau (5)
4.	Joué-lès-Tours FCT (8)	0–3	AS Montlouis-sur-Loire (5)
5.	Avoine OCC (5)	2–2 (2–4 p)	Tours FC (3)
6.	SO Romorantin (4)	5–1	US Châteauneuf-sur-Loire (5)
7.	ES Moulon Bourges (7)	0–5	Bourges Foot (5)
8.	AC Amboise (9)	0–6	Bourges 18 (5)

== Sixth round ==
These matches were played on 27 October 2018.

Sixth round results: Centre-Val de Loire
Tie no	Home team (tier)	Score	Away team (tier)
1.	AS Montlouis-sur-Loire (5)	0–2	Blois Football 41 (4)
2.	Bourges Foot (5)	5–0	SO Romorantin (4)
3.	Bourges 18 (5)	0–2	Tours FC (3)
4.	Vineuil SF (6)	0–3	Saint-Pryvé Saint-Hilaire FC (4)
