= 2021–22 Coupe de France preliminary rounds, Centre-Val de Loire =

The 2021–22 Coupe de France preliminary rounds, Centre-Val de Loire was the qualifying competition to decide which teams from the leagues of the Centre-Val de Loire region of France took part in the main competition from the seventh round.

A total of six teams qualified from the Centre-Val de Loire preliminary rounds. In 2020–21, SO Romorantin progressed furthest in the main competition, reaching the round of 32 before losing to Voltigeurs de Châteaubriant.

== Draws and fixtures ==
On 15 July 2021, the league published the draw for the first three rounds of the competition, the preliminary round, first round and second round. A total of 244 teams from the region entered the competition. 50 teams from District 3 and District 4 levels entered in the preliminary round, with a single District 3 team exempted to the first round. The 84 remaining District level teams entered at the first round stage. 67 teams from the Régional leagues entered at the second round stage. The 10 Championnat National 3 teams entered at the third round stage, the 6 Championnat National 2 teams entered at the fourth round stage, the 2 Championnat National teams entered at the fifth round stage.

The third round draw was published on 7 September 2021. The fourth round draw was published on 21 September 2021. The fifth round draw was published on 5 October 2021. The sixth round draw was made on 19 October 2021.

=== Preliminary round ===
These matches were played on 29 August 2021.

Preliminary round results: Centre-Val de Loire
Tie no	Home team (tier)	Score	Away team (tier)
1.	AS Tréon (11)	5–0	RC Bû Abondant (11)
2.	AS Châteauneuf-en-Thymerais (11)	2–5	CS Aunay-sous-Auneau (10)
3.	La Gauloise Foot (11)	1–4	US Pontoise (11)
4.	RS Patay (12)	5–2	US Alluyes (11)
5.	Avionnette Parçay-Meslay FC (11)	1–1 (5–4 p)	ASPO Tours (11)
6.	US Saint-Martin-le-Beau (12)	4–1	AS de l'Aubrière Saint-Pierre-des-Corps (11)
7.	Shoot d'Ingrandes (12)	0–5	AC Bréhémont (11)
8.	US Champigny-sur-Veude (12)	1–2	AF Bouchardais (11)
9.	US Saint-Nicolas-de-Bourgueil (12)	1–8	ES Val de Veude (11)
10.	AAS Cléry-Mareau (11)	1–0	La Fraternelle de Bou (11)
11.	AS Mur-de-Sologne (11)	11–0	CA Dhuizon (12)
12.	US Chémery/Méhers/Saint-Romain (11)	2–4	AC Amboise (11)
13.	SC La Croix-en-Touraine (11)	4–1	AS Nazelles-Négron (11)
14.	Reignac Chambourg Val d'Indre (11)	2–2 (4–3 p)	CS Tourangeau Veigne (11)
15.	US Pouillé-Mareuil (11)	2–1	AJS Théséenne (11)
16.	US Ports-Nouâtre (11)	1–7	US Montbazon (11)
17.	AS Ingrandes (11)	0–4	AC Villers-les-Ormes (11)
18.	AS Les Bordes (11)	0–5	JS de la Montagne (11)
19.	ECL Saint-Christophe (13)	2–1	AS Jeu-les-Bois (11)
20.	AS Saint-Georges-de-Poisieux (11)	1–1 (5–6 p)	AS Ardentes (11)
21.	SS Cluis (11)	1–0	FC Saint-Denis-de-Jouhet/Sarzay (11)
22.	CS Foëcy (11)	1–0	ES Brécy (11)
23.	SS La Solognote Souesmes (11)	9–1	US Briare (11)
24.	ASC Franco-Turque de Bourges et du Cher (12)	1–1 (14–15 p)	US Sainte-Solange (12)
25.	AJS Bourges (12)	0–3 (Note: Tie won by means of forfeit.)	ES Justices Bourges (11)

=== First round ===
These matches were played on 28 and 29 August and 5 September 2021.

First round results: Centre-Val de Loire
Tie no	Home team (tier)	Score	Away team (tier)
1.	FC Tremblay-les-Villages (9)	0–3(5–6 p)	FC Lèves (10)
2.	FC Nogent-le-Phaye (10)	3–0	Amicale Sours (9)
3.	Amicale Gallardon (10)	0–7	ACSF Dreux (9)
4.	UP Illiers-Combray (9)	1–1 (6–5 p)	AS Nogent-le-Rotrou (10)
5.	US Monnaie (9)	3–0	Football Choisille Lamembrolle-Mettray (10)
6.	ES Azé Thoré Lunay (10)	2–4	FC Beauvoir (10)
7.	FC Gâtine Choisilles (10)	1–0	US Selommes (10)
8.	CS Oucques (10)	0–4	OC Châteaudun (9)
9.	US Renaudine (9)	3–0	ES Oésienne (10)
10.	CA Ouzouer-le-Marché (9)	7–1	AS Suèvres (10)
11.	SA Marboué (10)	0–4	US Vallée du Loir (9)
12.	AS Chanceaux (9)	1–3	ASL Orchaise (9)
13.	AG Boigny-Chécy-Mardié (9)	1–0	USS Portugais Orléans (10)
14.	ES Beauceronne (10)	1–4	CS Angerville-Pussay (9)
15.	ES Loges et Forêt (9)	2–4	Neuville Sports (9)
16.	CD Espagnol Orléans (10)	4–3	FC Mandorais (10)
17.	SC Malesherbes (9)	5–0	US Châlette (10)
18.	FC Vallée de l'Ouanne (9)	2–2 (4–2 p)	ES Marigny (9)
19.	US Saint-Pierre-des-Corps (9)	3–1	ES Bourgueil (9)
20.	FC Véretz-Azay-Larçay (10)	4–2	OC Tours (10)
21.	AS Villiers-au-Bouin (9)	5–1	AS Fondettes (9)
22.	FC Étoile Verte (9)	3–0	US Véronaise (10)
23.	AS Saint-Gervais-la-Forêt (10)	2–0	AS Salbris (10)
24.	JS Cormeray (10)	1–2	ES Villebarou (9)
25.	ES Chargé (10)	2–2 (1–2 p)	FC Bléré Val de Cher (9)
26.	Saint-Roch City Romorantin (10)	4–0	CS Lusitanos Beaugency (9)
27.	Jargeau-Saint-Denis FC (10)	5–4	US2O Loire et Trézee (10)
28.	FC Coullons-Cerdon (10)	1–5	ES Nancray-Chambon-Nibelle (9)
29.	Entente Savigny Boulleret (10)	0–1	ES Aubigny (9)
30.	RC Bouzy-Les Bordes (10)	1–2	US Fertesienne (10)
31.	COS Marcilly-en-Villette (10)	1–3	FCO Saint-Jean-de-la-Ruelle (9)
32.	US Poilly-Autry (10)	3–1	Olympique Mehunois (10)
33.	Olympique Portugais Mehun-sur-Yèvre (9)	3–0	FC Verdigny Sancerre (9)
34.	AS Chabris (10)	3–0	AS Esvres (10)
35.	EGC Touvent Châteauroux (9)	0–5	ES Poulaines (9)
36.	JAS Moulins-sur-Céphons (10)	1–2	FC Velles-Arthon-La Pérouille 36 (9)
37.	Entente Le Pont-Chrétien-Chabenet (10)	1–1 (1–4 p)	US Villedieu-sur-Indre (10)
38.	AC Parnac Val d'Abloux (9)	2–0	FC Luant (10)
39.	FC Berry Touraine (10)	2–0	US Saint-Aignan Noyers (10)
40.	ACS Buzançais (9)	7–0	AS Niherne (10)
41.	Entente Arpheuilles-Clion-Saulnay (10)	0–6	US Yzeures-Preuilly (9)
42.	ES Vallée Verte (9)	0–1	Loches AC (10)
43.	FC Levroux (9)	3–1	USC Châtres-Langon-Mennetou (9)
44.	US Gâtines (10)	2–2 (3–5 p)	US Pruniers-en-Sologne (9)
45.	ES Vineuil-Brion (10)	2–6	FC Portugais Selles-sur-Cher (10)
46.	Avenir Lignières (9)	1–0	SA Issoudun (9)
47.	SL Chaillot Vierzon (9)	0–2	US Reuilly (9)
48.	US Châteaumeillant-Le Châtelet-Culan (10)	0–3	US Aigurande (9)
49.	Olympique Morthomiers (10)	2–3	SC Châteauneuf-sur-Cher (9)
50.	Étoile Châteauroux (10)	6–0	US Saint-Florent-sur-Cher (10)
51.	ES Étrechet (10)	0–2	ECF Bouzanne Vallée Noire (9)
52.	US Charenton-du-Cher (10)	1–2	EAS Orval (9)
53.	FC Avord (10)	5–1	ASIE du Cher (10)
54.	AS Chapelloise (9)	5–0	Avenir de la Septaine (9)
55.	CS Aunay-sous-Auneau (10)	1–1 (2–4 p)	AS Tréon (11)
56.	US Pontoise (11)	3–1	RS Patay (12)
57.	US Argy (11)	1–6	US Saint-Martin-le-Beau (12)
58.	AC Bréhémont (11)	1–1 (5–4 p)	Avionnette Parçay-Meslay FC (11)
59.	ES Val de Veude (11)	3–1	AF Bouchardais (11)
60.	AS Mur-de-Sologne (11)	2–3	AAS Cléry-Mareau (11)
61.	AC Amboise (11)	3–1	SC La Croix-en-Touraine (11)
62.	Reignac Chambourg Val d'Indre (11)	0–2	US Pouillé-Mareuil (11)
63.	US Montbazon (11)	3–3 (2–4 p)	AC Villers-les-Ormes (11)
64.	ECL Saint-Christophe (13)	2–1	JS de la Montagne (11)
65.	AS Ardentes (11)	1–1 (7–6 p)	SS Cluis (11)
66.	SS La Solognote Souesmes (11)	12–5	CS Foëcy (11)
67.	US Sainte-Solange (12)	5–1	ES Justices Bourges (11)

=== Second round ===
These matches were played on 4, 5 and 12 September 2021.

Second round results: Centre-Val de Loire
Tie no	Home team (tier)	Score	Away team (tier)
1.	FC Lèves (10)	2–2 (2–4 p)	AS Tout Horizon Dreux (8)
2.	FC Nogent-le-Phaye (10)	2–2 (1–3 p)	ES Maintenon-Pierres (8)
3.	Amicale Épernon (8)	0–3	CS Mainvilliers (7)
4.	ACSF Dreux (9)	2–4	FC Saint-Georges-sur-Eure (6)
5.	UP Illiers-Combray (9)	4–2	ES Nogent-le-Roi (7)
6.	FJ Champhol (8)	0–10	FC Drouais (6)
7.	ASL Orchaise (9)	1–2	US Beaugency Val-de-Loire (7)
8.	FC Gâtine Choisilles (10)	1–6	Dammarie Foot Bois-Gueslin (8)
9.	CA Ouzouer-le-Marché (9)	0–1	US Vendôme (8)
10.	US Renaudine (9)	1–3	US Mer (8)
11.	Amicale de Lucé (8)	6–2	OC Châteaudun (9)
12.	US Vallée du Loir (9)	0–1	Luisant AC (7)
13.	FC Beauvoir (10)	0–0 (5–4 p)	AS Baccon-Huisseau (8)
14.	Avenir Saint-Amand-Longpré (8)	1–1 (6–5 p)	US Monnaie (9)
15.	AG Boigny-Chécy-Mardié (9)	1–0	ES Gâtinaise (8)
16.	CJF Fleury-les-Aubrais (8)	2–5	CA Pithiviers (6)
17.	ESCALE Orléans (8)	4–2	FC Vallée de l'Ouanne (9)
18.	FCM Ingré (7)	0–2	Neuville Sports (9)
19.	SC Malesherbes (9)	3–0	ES Chaingy-Saint-Ay (7)
20.	SMOC Saint-Jean-de-Braye (7)	5–0	Avenir Ymonville (8)
21.	CS Angerville-Pussay (9)	2–3	CD Espagnol Orléans (10)
22.	FC Étoile Verte (9)	4–0	Le Richelais (8)
23.	SC Azay-Cheillé (6)	3–2	AC Portugal Tours (7)
24.	US Portugaise Joué-lès-Tours (7)	8–2	AS Monts (8)
25.	ES La Ville-aux-Dames (8)	0–5	Joué-lès-Tours FCT (7)
26.	US Saint-Pierre-des-Corps (9)	1–4	ÉB Saint-Cyr-sur-Loire (6)
27.	FC Pays Langeaisien (8)	2–2 (5–4 p)	Racing La Riche-Tours (8)
28.	AS Villiers-au-Bouin (9)	2–2 (4–5 p)	Chambray FC (6)
29.	ES Villebarou (9)	4–1	AS Saint-Gervais-la-Forêt (10)
30.	FC Bléré Val de Cher (9)	1–4	AS Contres (6)
31.	AFC Blois (8)	1–3	Vineuil SF (6)
32.	USM Olivet (7)	0–2	ASJ La Chaussée-Saint-Victor (7)
33.	Saint-Roch City Romorantin (10)	1–1 (3–5 p)	US Chitenay-Cellettes (8)
34.	SC Massay (7)	1–2	AS Chouzy-Onzain (8)
35.	US Poilly-Autry (10)	4–3	US Henrichemont-Menetou-Salon (8)
36.	Diables Rouges Selles-Saint-Denis (8)	4–1	ES Aubigny (9)
37.	Olympique Portugais Mehun-sur-Yèvre (9)	2–0	CS Vignoux-sur-Barangeon (8)
38.	US Fertesienne (10)	2–2 (4–2 p)	US Dampierre-en-Burly (8)
39.	Jargeau-Saint-Denis FC (10)	2–0	CSM Sully-sur-Loire (7)
40.	ES Nancray-Chambon-Nibelle (9)	1–2	FCO Saint-Jean-de-la-Ruelle (9)
41.	FC Levroux (9)	1–1 (2–4 p)	FC Berry Touraine (10)
42.	AS Chabris (10)	0–5	US Saint-Maur (8)
43.	US Pruniers-en-Sologne (9)	1–3	Loches AC (10)
44.	FC Portugais Selles-sur-Cher (10)	0–3	US Le Blanc (8)
45.	US Villedieu-sur-Indre (10)	2–3	ACS Buzançais (9)
46.	SC Vatan (8)	5–1	Cher-Sologne Football (8)
47.	CA Montrichard (8)	1–1 (2–4 p)	ES Poulaines (9)
48.	US Yzeures-Preuilly (9)	1–4	AC Parnac Val d'Abloux (9)
49.	FC Velles-Arthon-La Pérouille 36 (9)	0–2	Saint-Georges Descartes (8)
50.	ECF Bouzanne Vallée Noire (9)	1–1 (4–5 p)	Avenir Lignières (9)
51.	ES Trouy (8)	5–1	US Aigurande (9)
52.	US La Châtre (8)	1–1 (5–6 p)	FC Diors (7)
53.	SC Châteauneuf-sur-Cher (9)	0–0 (2–3 p)	US Montgivray (8)
54.	US Le Poinçonnet (8)	1–1 (5–3 p)	US Argenton Le Pêchereau (8)
55.	US Reuilly (9)	1–2	Étoile Châteauroux (10)
56.	AS Chapelloise (9)	0–2	FC Fussy-Saint-Martin-Vigneux (8)
57.	FC Avord (10)	0–7	AS Portugais Bourges (6)
58.	FC Saint-Doulchard (7)	3–2	Gazélec Bourges (8)
59.	EAS Orval (9)	0–4	AS Saint-Germain-du-Puy (8)
60.	AS Saint-Amandoise (6)	1–2	ES Moulon Bourges (7)
61.	AS Tréon (11)	6–2	US Pontoise (11)
62.	US Saint-Martin-le-Beau (12)	0–3	FC Véretz-Azay-Larçay (10)
63.	AC Bréhémont (11)	1–1 (3–4 p)	ES Val de Veude (11)
64.	AAS Cléry-Mareau (11)	0–4	AC Amboise (11)
65.	US Pouillé-Mareuil (11)	1–5	AC Villers-les-Ormes (11)
66.	ECL Saint-Christophe (13)	0–1	AS Ardentes (11)
67.	US Sainte-Solange (12)	1–2	SS La Solognote Souesmes (11)

=== Third round ===
These matches were played on 18 and 19 September 2021.

Third round results: Centre-Val de Loire
Tie no	Home team (tier)	Score	Away team (tier)
1.	US Mer (8)	0–3	US Châteauneuf-sur-Loire (5)
2.	US Beaugency Val-de-Loire (7)	2–2 (4–3 p)	US Vendôme (8)
3.	AS Chouzy-Onzain (8)	7–0	ESCALE Orléans (8)
4.	SS La Solognote Souesmes (11)	1–7	CA Pithiviers (6)
5.	SC Malesherbes (9)	2–3	USM Montargis (5)
6.	FCO Saint-Jean-de-la-Ruelle (9)	2–2 (1–4 p)	US Poilly-Autry (10)
7.	AG Boigny-Chécy-Mardié (9)	1–1 (4–5 p)	AS Contres (6)
8.	Neuville Sports (9)	6–1	US Fertesienne (10)
9.	Jargeau-Saint-Denis FC (10)	0–3	J3S Amilly (5)
10.	ES Villebarou (9)	0–1	ASJ La Chaussée-Saint-Victor (7)
11.	FC Montlouis (5)	1–2	FC Drouais (6)
12.	AS Tréon (11)	1–0	ES Maintenon-Pierres (8)
13.	AS Tout Horizon Dreux (8)	2–4	Vineuil SF (6)
14.	Amicale de Lucé (8)	0–0 (2–4 p)	FC Saint-Jean-le-Blanc (5)
15.	UP Illiers-Combray (9)	1–3	Luisant AC (7)
16.	FC Saint-Georges-sur-Eure (6)	2–3	SMOC Saint-Jean-de-Braye (7)
17.	Dammarie Foot Bois-Gueslin (8)	2–4	USM Saran (5)
18.	CD Espagnol Orléans (10)	4–1	Avenir Saint-Amand-Longpré (8)
19.	FC Beauvoir (10)	0–2	CS Mainvilliers (7)
20.	FC Pays Langeaisien (8)	0–7	SC Azay-Cheillé (6)
21.	ES Val de Veude (11)	1–5	US Portugaise Joué-lès-Tours (7)
22.	Saint-Georges Descartes (8)	2–0	FC Étoile Verte (9)
23.	FC Véretz-Azay-Larçay (10)	0–3	US Le Blanc (8)
24.	US Chitenay-Cellettes (8)	1–2	Tours FC (6)
25.	AC Parnac Val d'Abloux (9)	0–7	FC Ouest Tourangeau (5)
26.	Loches AC (10)	0–2	ÉB Saint-Cyr-sur-Loire (6)
27.	AC Amboise (11)	1–5	Joué-lès-Tours FCT (7)
28.	ES Poulaines (9)	2–1	SC Vatan (8)
29.	ACS Buzançais (9)	0–8	Avoine OCC (5)
30.	ES Trouy (8)	2–0	Chambray FC (6)
31.	FC Diors (7)	0–1	Diables Rouges Selles-Saint-Denis (8)
32.	FC Berry Touraine (10)	1–5	FC Saint-Doulchard (7)
33.	AC Villers-les-Ormes (11)	0–0 (5–4 p)	US Le Poinçonnet (8)
34.	ES Moulon Bourges (7)	0–1	Vierzon FC (5)
35.	Avenir Lignières (9)	3–1	AS Portugais Bourges (6)
36.	AS Ardentes (11)	0–5	FC Fussy-Saint-Martin-Vigneux (8)
37.	US Saint-Maur (8)	2–0	US Montgivray (8)
38.	Étoile Châteauroux (10)	0–4	FC Déolois (5)
39.	AS Saint-Germain-du-Puy (8)	0–0 (3–4 p)	Olympique Portugais Mehun-sur-Yèvre (9)

=== Fourth round ===
These matches were played on 2 and 3 October 2021.

Fourth round results: Centre-Val de Loire
Tie no	Home team (tier)	Score	Away team (tier)
1.	CD Espagnol Orléans (10)	0–4	FC Drouais (6)
2.	Saint-Pryvé Saint-Hilaire FC (4)	0–0 (1–3 p)	J3S Amilly (5)
3.	AS Contres (6)	1–2	USM Saran (5)
4.	AS Tréon (11)	1–2	Vineuil SF (6)
5.	CA Pithiviers (6)	3–2	USM Montargis (5)
6.	SMOC Saint-Jean-de-Braye (7)	0–0 (3–4 p)	US Châteauneuf-sur-Loire (5)
7.	US Beaugency Val-de-Loire (7)	0–1	FC Saint-Jean-le-Blanc (5)
8.	AS Chouzy-Onzain (8)	0–8	C'Chartres Football (4)
9.	Neuville Sports (9)	1–5	CS Mainvilliers (7)
10.	US Portugaise Joué-lès-Tours (7)	2–1	Luisant AC (7)
11.	US Poilly-Autry (10)	0–4	ASJ La Chaussée-Saint-Victor (7)
12.	Saint-Georges Descartes (8)	2–6	FC Déolois (5)
13.	Diables Rouges Selles-Saint-Denis (8)	0–6	Tours FC (6)
14.	ES Trouy (8)	1–1 (3–5 p)	ES Poulaines (9)
15.	Avenir Lignières (9)	1–3	FC Saint-Doulchard (7)
16.	Olympique Portugais Mehun-sur-Yèvre (9)	1–5	Vierzon FC (5)
17.	AC Villers-les-Ormes (11)	1–3	SO Romorantin (4)
18.	FC Ouest Tourangeau (5)	3–0	Avoine OCC (5)
19.	US Le Blanc (8)	2–3	SC Azay-Cheillé (6)
20.	Blois Football 41 (4)	2–1	Bourges Foot 18 (4)
21.	ÉB Saint-Cyr-sur-Loire (6)	0–0 (0–2 p)	Joué-lès-Tours FCT (7)
22.	FC Fussy-Saint-Martin-Vigneux (8)	2–1	US Saint-Maur (8)

=== Fifth round ===
These matches were played on 16 and 17 October 2021.

Fifth round results: Centre-Val de Loire
Tie no	Home team (tier)	Score	Away team (tier)
1.	Vineuil SF (6)	0–1	US Orléans (3)
2.	FC Drouais (6)	2–2 (8–9 p)	CS Mainvilliers (7)
3.	US Portugaise Joué-lès-Tours (7)	0–5	US Châteauneuf-sur-Loire (5)
4.	ASJ La Chaussée-Saint-Victor (7)	0–2	FC Saint-Jean-le-Blanc (5)
5.	C'Chartres Football (4)	2–0	USM Saran (5)
6.	J3S Amilly (5)	1–1 (5–4 p)	CA Pithiviers (6)
7.	ES Poulaines (9)	0–2	FC Déolois (5)
8.	FC Saint-Doulchard (7)	0–7	FC Ouest Tourangeau (5)
9.	Tours FC (6)	3–2	Blois Football 41 (4)
10.	Joué-lès-Tours FCT (7)	2–0	SC Azay-Cheillé (6)
11.	SO Romorantin (4)	1–2	LB Châteauroux (3)
12.	FC Fussy-Saint-Martin-Vigneux (8)	2–4	Vierzon FC (5)

=== Sixth round ===
These matches were played on 30 and 31 October 2021.

Sixth round results: Centre-Val de Loire
Tie no	Home team (tier)	Score	Away team (tier)
1.	Joué-lès-Tours FCT (7)	0–10	US Orléans (3)
2.	Vierzon FC (5)	1–0	Tours FC (6)
3.	FC Déolois (5)	1–1 (2–4 p)	J3S Amilly (5)
4.	FC Ouest Tourangeau (5)	0–0 (5–3 p)	LB Châteauroux (3)
5.	US Châteauneuf-sur-Loire (5)	1–2	C'Chartres Football (4)
6.	CS Mainvilliers (7)	2–2 (4–3 p)	FC Saint-Jean-le-Blanc (5)
