= 2023–24 Coupe de France preliminary rounds, Centre-Val de Loire =

The 2023–24 Coupe de France preliminary rounds, Centre-Val de Loire is the qualifying competition to decide which teams from the leagues of the Centre-Val de Loire region of France take part in the main competition from the seventh round.

A total of six teams will qualify from the Centre-Val de Loire section of the 2023–24 Coupe de France preliminary rounds.

In 2022–23, Vierzon FC were the last amateur team in the main competition, reaching the round of 16, where they were narrowly beaten by Grenoble.

== Draws and fixtures ==
On 20 July 2023, the league published that 238 teams from the region had entered the competition, and that 170 teams would enter at the first round stage, being the teams from the departmental divisions and four team from Régional 3. The remaining teams from Régional 3, plus the teams from the other regional divisions (totalling 51) would enter at the second round stage. On the same day, the first and second round draws were published. The second round draw was published on 28 August 2023.

The third round draw, featuring the 8 teams from Championnat National 3, was published on 6 September 2023. The fourth round draw, including the five teams from Championnat National 2, was carried out live on the Facebook page of the league on 20 September 2023. The fourth round draw, featuring the two teams from Championnat National, was carried out on 4 October 2023. The sixth and final regional round was drawn on 18 October 2023.

=== First round ===
These matches were played on 27 August 2023, with one replayed on 3 September 2023.

First Round Results: Centre-Val de Loire
Tie no	Home team (Tier)	Score	Away team (Tier)
1.	AS Tréon (10)	4–2	RC Bû Abondant (11)
2.	ES Nogent-le-Roi (9)	1–1 (0–3 p)	AS Châteauneuf-en-Thymerais (10)
3.	AS Villemeux (10)	0–1	FC Lèves (9)
4.	Amicale Courvilloise (10)	5–3	FC Rémois (11)
5.	Association Portugaise Dreux (11)	0–8	FJ Champhol (9)
6.	AS Tout Horizon Dreux (9)	1–5 (Note: Tie reversed from original draw.) (Note: US Brezolles penalised for fielding too many players transferred players, AS Tout Horizon Dreux qualify.)	US Brezolles (10)
7.	FC Artenay Chevilly (11)	2–5	US Vendôme (9)
8.	ALEP Saint-Ouen (11)	1–3	AS Nogent-le-Rotrou (9)
9.	AG Savigny (10)	2–6	US Petite Beauce (9)
10.	SA Marboué (10)	3–0	US Vallée du Loir (10)
11.	US Alluyes (10)	0–4	Étoile de Brou (10)
12.	Amicale Sours (9)	2–2 (3–4 p)	Avenir Ymonville (9)
13.	FC Nogent-le-Phaye (10)	0–3	Luisant AC (8)
14.	US Voves Foot (11)	3–4	FC Lucé Ouest (10)
15.	FC Les Bords De l'Eure (11)	2–8	Auneau FC (11)
16.	US Saint-Nicolas-de-Bourgeuil (11)	0–1	Football Saint-Benoit Huismes (11)
17.	Saint-Avertin Sports (11)	0–5	ES Bourgueil (10)
18.	AS Esvres (11)	3–2	US Saint-Martin-le-Beau (11)
19.	AS Tours Sud (11)	0–1	AS Fondettes (10)
20.	FC Véretz-Azay-Larçay (10)	0–3	Racing La Riche-Tours (9)
21.	ASPO Tours (10)	1–1 (4–3 p)	AS Villiers-au-Bouin (10)
22.	US Pernay (10)	0–1	US Saint-Pierre-des-Corps (9)
23.	AS Chanceaux (9)	1–1 (5–3 p)	FC Étoile Vert (9)
24.	FA Saint-Symphorien Tours (10)	1–1 (5–3 p)	CS Tourangeau Veigné (9)
25.	OC Tours (9)	4–0	Football Choisille La Membrolle-Mettray (10)
26.	AS Suèvres (11)	0–3 (Note: Tie won by means of forfeit.)	CA Saint-Laurent-Nouan La Ferté-Saint-Cyr (9)
27.	AS Chailles Candé 99 (10)	0–0 (5–3 p)	US Renaudine (9)
28.	AS Villedômer (11)	1–1 (2–4 p)	ASJ La Chaussée-Saint-Victor (9)
29.	US Chémery/Méhers/Saint-Romain (11)	2–2 (4–5 p)	FC Val de Cissé (11)
30.	US Chitenay-Cellettes (10)	4–0 (Note: Original match abandoned after 60 minutes due to serious injury to a US Chitenay-Cellettes player. Replayed in full on 3 September 2023.)	ES Chargé (10)
31.	US Saint-Aignan Noyers (10)	2–1	ASL Orchaise (9)
32.	AJS Théséenne (10)	3–2	US Saint-Georges-sur-Cher (9)
33.	US Fougères Ouchamps Feings (11)	1–1 (3–2 p)	ÉS Villebarou (9)
34.	Union Saint-Romain-Pouillé-Mareuil (11)	2–3	JS Cormeray (11)
35.	FC Saint-Denis-en-Val (10)	1–4	CS Lusitanos Beaugency (10)
36.	FC Semoy (10)	0–0 (4–5 p)	US Beaugency Val-de-Loire (8)
37.	Union Portugaise SS Orléans (10)	4–1	FC Magdunois (10)
38.	US Saint-Cyr-en-Val (10)	4–2	ES Marigny (9)
39.	Francs Lurons Saint-Viâtre (11)	2–5	CSM Sully-sur-Loire (9)
40.	US Sandillon (11)	1–0	ASPTT Orléans (10)
41.	AS Baccon Huisseau (10)	1–1 (4–2 p)	CD Espagnol Orléans (10)
42.	AS Puiseaux (11)	0–1	US Turcs Chalette (9)
43.	US Cepoy-Corquilleroy (11)	0–1	Neuville Sports (9)
44.	US Châlette (10)	1–2	FC Vallée de l'Ouanne (9)
45.	US Lorris (11)	0–4	Entente Nancray Chambon Nibelle (9)
46.	FC Pays Montrésorois (11)	1–5	Loches AC (8)
47.	US Champigny-sur-Veude (10)	1–2	Saint-Georges Descartes (9)
48.	Reignac Chambourg Val d'Indre (11)	4–3	SC Villeperdue (11)
49.	ES Val de Veude (10)	3–0	ESJ La Celle-Saint-Avant (11)
50.	FC Sainte-Maure-Maillé (11)	2–1	US Antogny-le-Tillac (11)
51.	FC Portugais Selles-sur-Cher (10)	2–4	ES Poulaines (9)
52.	ES Villefranche (10)	1–0	Foot Sud 41 (8)
53.	ES Vineuil Brion (10)	1–2	SC Massay (9)
54.	US Gâtines (10)	1–3	US Pruniers (10)
55.	FC Céphons Bois d'Hault (10)	1–7	Cher-Sologne Football (9)
56.	US Reuilly (9)	3–3 (3–5 p)	USA Lury/Méreau (9)
57.	FC Levroux (9)	4–1	Graçay Genouilly Sports (10)
58.	Diables Rouges Selles-Saint-Denis (10)	2–0	AS Chabris (10)
59.	US Briare (11)	1–1 (5–6 p)	CS Foëcy (11)
60.	ASL Allouis (11)	2–1	AS Salbris (10)
61.	SS La Solognote Souesmes (9)	8–0	Olympique Mehunois (10)
62.	SL Chaillot Vierzon (9)	2–1	CS Vignoux (10)
63.	US Les Aix-Rians (9)	3–0	Bonny-Beaulieu FC (10)
64.	FC Coullons-Cerdon (11)	2–0	ES Aubigny (10)
65.	US Poilly-Autry (10)	1–1 (2–4 p)	US Nancay-Neuvy-Vouzeron (10)
66.	AC Parnac Val d'Abloux (10)	3–1	FC Marche Occitane (9)
67.	FC Berry Touraine (10)	1–9	US Villedieu-sur-Indre (10)
68.	US Brenne-Vendoeuvres (10)	6–0	AS Ingrandes (11)
69.	AS Niherne (11)	0–6	SS Bélâbre (10)
70.	Espérance Le Pont-Chrétien-Chabenet (11)	2–3	FC Velles-Arthon-La Pérouille 36 (10)
71.	FC Saint-Denis-de-Jouhet/Sarzay (11)	0–4	US Saint-Maur (9)
72.	ECF Bouzanne Vallée Noire (10)	2–0	AS Ardentes (9)
73.	AC Saint-Août (12)	0–4	SS Cluis (10)
74.	US La Châtre (9)	4–1	EGC Touvent Châteauroux (9)
75.	US Aigurande (9)	2–1	FC Diors (9)
76.	SC Châteauneuf-sur-Cher (9)	3–0	Étoile Châteauroux (9)
77.	ECL Saint-Christophe (10)	3–0	FC Bas-Berry (11)
78.	AS Neuvy-Pailloux (12)	0–3	AAE Nohant-Vic (10)
79.	AS Chalivoy-Milon (11)	1–8	AS Chapelloise (9)
80.	US Saint-Florent-sur-Cher (10)	14–0	ES Brécy (11)
81.	US Sainte-Solange (10)	3–1	US Charenton-du-Cher (9)
82.	AS Baugy (11)	4–2	EAS Orval (9)
83.	FC Nerondes (12)	2–2 (4–2 p)	Olympique Loire Val d'Aubois (10)
84.	US Plaimpied-Givaudins (11)	1–6	ES Sancoins (10)
85.	ES Justices Bourges (10)	5–2	AS Bigny-Vallenay (11)

=== Second round ===
These matches were played on 2 and 3 September 2023, with one delayed until 10 September 2023, due to the replay of a match in the previous round.

Second Round Results: Centre-Val de Loire
Tie no	Home team (Tier)	Score	Away team (Tier)
1.	ES Maintenon-Pierres (8)	5–2	AS Tréon (10)
2.	AS Châteauneuf-en-Thymerais (10)	2–4	ACSF Dreux (8)
3.	Amicale Épernon (8)	1–3	FC Drouais (6)
4.	AS Tout Horizon Dreux (9)	3–1	FC Lèves (9)
5.	FJ Champhol (9)	3–1	Amicale Courvilloise (10)
6.	SA Marboué (10)	0–0 (3–5 p)	FC Beauvoir (8)
7.	Étoile de Brou (10)	0–4	US Vendôme (9)
8.	AS Nogent-le-Rotrou (9)	1–2	US Petite Beauce (9)
9.	Dammarie Foot Bois-Gueslin (8)	3–1	Amicale de Lucé (6)
10.	Avenir Ymonville (9)	0–5	C'Chartres Football (6)
11.	FC Lucé Ouest (10)	0–10	Luisant AC (8)
12.	Auneau FC (11)	2–5	FC Saint-Georges-sur-Eure (7)
13.	ES Bourgueil (10)	5–3	ASPO Tours (10)
14.	AS Fondettes (10)	0–5	Racing La Riche-Tours (9)
15.	SC Azay-Cheillé (7)	4–2	Joué-lès-Tours FCT (7)
16.	US Saint-Pierre-des-Corps (9)	0–0 (4–3 p)	ES La Ville-aux-Dames (8)
17.	AS Monts (8)	0–2	AS Chanceaux (9)
18.	AC Portugal Tours (6)	3–2	US Monnaie (7)
19.	AS Esvres (11)	3–11	ÉB Saint-Cyr-sur-Loire (7)
20.	Football Saint-Benoit Huismes (11)	0–3	US Portugaise Joué-lès-Tours (7)
21.	OC Tours (9)	2–1	FA Saint-Symphorien Tours (10)
22.	CA Montrichard (8)	0–4	US Mer (7)
23.	AS Chailles Candé 99 (10)	2–1	US Fougères Ouchamps Feings (11)
24.	ASJ La Chaussée-Saint-Victor (9)	0–3	AS Contres (7)
25.	CA Saint-Laurent-Nouan La Ferté-Saint-Cyr (9)	2–1	US Chitenay-Cellettes (10)
26.	AJS Théséenne (10)	2–9	Avenir Saint-Amand-Longpré (8)
27.	US Saint-Aignan Noyers (10)	0–3	AS Chouzy-Onzain (8)
28.	FC Val de Cissé (11)	2–2 (4–3 p)	JS Cormeray (11)
29.	CSM Sully-sur-Loire (9)	0–4	SMOC Saint-Jean-de-Braye (7)
30.	FCM Ingré (8)	1–3	FC Saint-Jean-le-Blanc (6)
31.	US Sandillon (11)	0–3	US Beaugency Val-de-Loire (8)
32.	US Saint-Cyr-en-Val (10)	0–8	CJF Fleury-les-Aubrais (7)
33.	AS Baccon Huisseau (10)	0–2	AG Boigny-Chécy-Mardié (8)
34.	CS Lusitanos Beaugency (10)	6–2	Union Portugaise SS Orléans (10)
35.	FC Vallée de l'Ouanne (9)	1–4	J3S Amilly (6)
36.	Neuville Sports (9)	4–1	US Turcs Chalette (9)
37.	Entente Nancray Chambon Nibelle (9)	0–2	SC Malesherbes (7)
38.	FC Mandorais (8)	0–2	USM Montargis (6)
39.	ES Val de Veude (10)	1–2	Le Richelais (7)
40.	FC Sainte-Maure-Maillé (11)	1–4	Loches AC (8)
41.	Reignac Chambourg Val d'Indre (11)	1–6	Saint-Georges Descartes (9)
42.	ES Villefranche (10)	3–5	SC Vatan (8)
43.	US Pruniers (10)	3–1	ES Poulaines (9)
44.	Cher-Sologne Football (9)	0–8	FC Déolois (6)
45.	SC Massay (9)	1–2	Diables Rouges Selles-Saint-Denis (10)
46.	USA Lury/Méreau (9)	6–1	FC Levroux (9)
47.	FC Val de Loire (8)	1–2	FC Saint-Doulchard (6)
48.	FC Coullons-Cerdon (11)	2–5	US Les Aix-Rians (9)
49.	FC Fussy-Saint-Martin-Vigneux (8)	1–6	US Dampierre-en-Burly (7)
50.	CS Foëcy (11)	2–3	US Nancay-Neuvy-Vouzeron (10)
51.	Olympique Portugais Mehun-sur-Yèvre (8)	5–2	SL Chaillot Vierzon (9)
52.	ASL Allouis (11)	0–2	SS La Solognote Souesmes (9)
53.	US Yzeures Preuilly (8)	1–4	US Le Blanc (7)
54.	FC Velles-Arthon-La Pérouille 36 (10)	1–3	AC Villers-les-Ormes (8)
55.	US Brenne-Vendoeuvres (10)	0–0 (4–3 p)	ACS Buzançais (8)
56.	SS Bélâbre (10)	0–6	US Argenton Le Pêchereau (8)
57.	US Villedieu-sur-Indre (10)	0–0 (3–4 p)	AC Parnac Val d'Abloux (10)
58.	US Aigurande (9)	0–4	US Le Poinçonnet (7)
59.	SS Cluis (10)	1–3	ECL Saint-Christophe (10)
60.	US Saint-Maur (9)	1–1 (4–5 p)	US Montgivray (8)
61.	AAE Nohant-Vic (10)	1–3	ECF Bouzanne Vallée Noire (10)
62.	SC Châteauneuf-sur-Cher (9)	2–1	US La Châtre (9)
63.	AS Saint-Amandoise (8)	3–5	ES Trouy (7)
64.	FC Nerondes (12)	2–2 (3–4 p)	ES Justices Bourges (10)
65.	AS Chapelloise (9)	2–2 (3–0 p)	AS Saint-Germain-du-Puy (8)
66.	ES Sancoins (10)	1–0	Gazélec Bourges (8)
67.	AS Baugy (11)	0–2	AS Portugais Bourges (8)
68.	US Saint-Florent-sur-Cher (10)	1–2	US Sainte-Solange (10)

=== Third round ===
These matches were played on 16 and 17 September 2023.

Third Round Results: Centre-Val de Loire
Tie no	Home team (Tier)	Score	Away team (Tier)
1.	US Beaugency Val-de-Loire (8)	1–0	FC Drouais (6)
2.	CA Saint-Laurent-Nouan La Ferté-Saint-Cyr (9)	1–4	ES Maintenon-Pierres (8)
3.	US Petite Beauce (9)	1–1 (5–3 p)	OC Tours (9)
4.	Luisant AC (8)	0–0 (5–4 p)	CS Mainvilliers (5)
5.	ACSF Dreux (8)	2–2 (2–1 p)	J3S Amilly (6)
6.	CS Lusitanos Beaugency (10)	0–6	USM Montargis (6)
7.	AS Chailles Candé 99 (10)	1–0	FC Val de Cissé (11)
8.	FC Beauvoir (8)	0–12	Tours FC (5)
9.	SMOC Saint-Jean-de-Braye (7)	1–2	US Châteauneuf-sur-Loire (5)
10.	AS Chanceaux (9)	4–1	FJ Champhol (9)
11.	C'Chartres Football (6)	1–0	USM Saran (5)
12.	Neuville Sports (9)	0–1	FC Montlouis (5)
13.	Diables Rouges Selles-Saint-Denis (10)	1–4	US Portugaise Joué-lès-Tours (7)
14.	AS Tout Horizon Dreux (9)	2–4	Dammarie Foot Bois-Gueslin (8)
15.	SC Malesherbes (7)	2–2 (4–2 p)	US Mer (7)
16.	US Nancay-Neuvy-Vouzeron (10)	1–0	Avenir Saint-Amand-Longpré (8)
17.	US Pruniers (10)	0–5	FC Saint-Georges-sur-Eure (7)
18.	US Vendôme (9)	5–1	AG Boigny-Chécy-Mardié (8)
19.	US Dampierre-en-Burly (7)	2–4	CJF Fleury-les-Aubrais (7)
20.	US Sainte-Solange (10)	0–1	SC Châteauneuf-sur-Cher (9)
21.	US Le Blanc (7)	2–0 (Note: US Le Blanc penalised for fielding a player under a false identity, US Le Poinçonnet qualify.)	US Le Poinçonnet (7)
22.	AS Portugais Bourges (8)	1–1 (2–4 p)	US Saint-Pierre-des-Corps (9)
23.	Olympique Portugais Mehun-sur-Yèvre (8)	1–3	AC Portugal Tours (6)
24.	AS Chapelloise (9)	3–2	US Brenne-Vendoeuvres (10)
25.	US Les Aix-Rians (9)	2–0	AC Parnac Val d'Abloux (10)
26.	USA Lury/Méreau (9)	3–3 (4–2 p)	ES Bourgueil (10)
27.	ES Trouy (7)	1–4	Vierzon FC (5)
28.	ÉB Saint-Cyr-sur-Loire (7)	2–1	Chambray FC (5)
29.	Racing La Riche-Tours (9)	3–3 (2–4 p)	Le Richelais (7)
30.	FC Ouest Tourangeau (5)	2–3	FC Déolois (6)
31.	Loches AC (8)	0–2	Vineuil SF (5)
32.	ECF Bouzanne Vallée Noire (10)	0–3	AS Chouzy-Onzain (8)
33.	ECL Saint-Christophe (10)	2–0	ES Sancoins (10)
34.	ES Justices Bourges (10)	1–3	SC Vatan (8)
35.	US Montgivray (8)	0–3	ES Moulon Bourges (5)
36.	US Argenton Le Pêchereau (8)	1–1 (4–1 p)	SS La Solognote Souesmes (9)
37.	AS Contres (7)	4–1	SC Azay-Cheillé (7)
38.	FC Saint-Jean-le-Blanc (6)	3–3 (5–3 p)	FC Saint-Doulchard (6)
39.	Saint-Georges Descartes (9)	0–4	AC Villers-les-Ormes (8)

=== Fourth round ===
These matches were played on 30 September and 11 October 2023, with one postponed until 8 October 2023, awaiting the outcome of an investigation from the previous round.

Fourth Round Results: Centre-Val de Loire
Tie no	Home team (Tier)	Score	Away team (Tier)
1.	Dammarie Foot Bois-Gueslin (8)	1–3	Saint-Pryvé Saint-Hilaire FC (4)
2.	ES Maintenon-Pierres (8)	5–1	US Beaugency Val-de-Loire (8)
3.	AS Chanceaux (9)	0–0 (2–4 p)	Tours FC (5)
4.	FC Saint-Jean-le-Blanc (6)	1–3	Blois Football 41 (4)
5.	CJF Fleury-les-Aubrais (7)	4–1	ACSF Dreux (8)
6.	C'Chartres Football (6)	1–1 (4–5 p)	SC Malesherbes (7)
7.	US Saint-Pierre-des-Corps (9)	3–3 (3–5 p)	FC Montlouis (5)
8.	Luisant AC (8)	0–3	USM Montargis (6)
9.	AS Chailles Candé 99 (10)	0–6	US Châteauneuf-sur-Loire (5)
10.	US Vendôme (9)	1–2	FC Saint-Georges-sur-Eure (7)
11.	US Petite Beauce (9)	2–1	US Portugaise Joué-lès-Tours (7)
12.	US Argenton Le Pêchereau (8)	1–2	AC Portugal Tours (6)
13.	AC Villers-les-Ormes (8)	1–2	Vierzon FC (5)
14.	USA Lury/Méreau (9)	1–3	SO Romorantin (4)
15.	ECL Saint-Christophe (10)	0–3	Bourges Foot 18 (4)
16.	ES Moulon Bourges (5)	3–0	Vineuil SF (5)
17.	AS Chapelloise (9)	1–4	Avoine OCC (4)
18.	SC Vatan (8)	2–0	US Les Aix-Rians (9)
19.	US Le Poinçonnet (7)	1–1 (4–3 p)	AS Chouzy-Onzain (8)
20.	US Nancay-Neuvy-Vouzeron (10)	2–4	FC Déolois (6)
21.	ÉB Saint-Cyr-sur-Loire (7)	4–2	AS Contres (7)
22.	SC Châteauneuf-sur-Cher (9)	1–1 (4–1 p)	Le Richelais (7)

=== Fifth round ===
These matches were played on 14 and 15 October 2023.

Fifth Round Results: Centre-Val de Loire
Tie no	Home team (Tier)	Score	Away team (Tier)
1.	AC Portugal Tours (6)	0–2	Tours FC (5)
2.	US Orléans (3)	1–0	Blois Football 41 (4)
3.	US Petite Beauce (9)	2–1	USM Montargis (6)
4.	SC Malesherbes (7)	1–0	ES Maintenon-Pierres (8)
5.	FC Saint-Georges-sur-Eure (7)	1–4	Vierzon FC (5)
6.	US Châteauneuf-sur-Loire (5)	0–5	Saint-Pryvé Saint-Hilaire FC (4)
7.	US Le Poinçonnet (7)	0–2	Avoine OCC (4)
8.	CJF Fleury-les-Aubrais (7)	1–8	ÉB Saint-Cyr-sur-Loire (7)
9.	FC Montlouis (5)	2–2 (5–4 p)	Bourges Foot 18 (4)
10.	ES Moulon Bourges (5)	0–5	LB Châteauroux (3)
11.	SC Vatan (8)	1–1 (4–5 p)	SC Châteauneuf-sur-Cher (9)
12.	FC Déolois (6)	0–1	SO Romorantin (4)

=== Sixth round ===
These matches were played on 28 and 29 October 2023.

Sixth Round Results: Centre-Val de Loire
Tie no	Home team (Tier)	Score	Away team (Tier)
1.	US Petite Beauce (9)	0–2	FC Montlouis (5)
2.	SC Malesherbes (7)	1–2	Avoine OCC (4)
3.	SO Romorantin (4)	2–1	Tours FC (5)
4.	ÉB Saint-Cyr-sur-Loire (7)	0–1	Vierzon FC (5)
5.	Saint-Pryvé Saint-Hilaire FC (4)	1–1 (3–4 p)	US Orléans (3)
6.	SC Châteauneuf-sur-Cher (9)	0–3	LB Châteauroux (3)
