= 2022–23 Coupe de France preliminary rounds, Centre-Val de Loire =

The 2022–23 Coupe de France preliminary rounds, Centre-Val de Loire is the qualifying competition to decide which teams from the leagues of the Centre-Val de Loire region of France take part in the main competition from the seventh round.

A total of six teams will qualify from the Centre-Val de Loire preliminary rounds. Preliminary rounds start on 11 June 2022.

In 2021–22, C'Chartres Football progressed furthest in the main competition, reaching the round of 64, where they were beaten by US Chauvigny, from the division below, and missing out on a tie against Olympique de Marseille in the next round.

== Draws and fixtures ==
In late April 2022, the league published their plans to hold three preliminary rounds in June 2022. However, when the first round draw was made on 31 May 2022, this had been reduced to one round in June and one in August. Originally, 104 teams from the District divisions entered at the first round stage, with 23 District 1 teams given byes to the second round. On 20 July 2022, the league announced that due to changes higher up the structure (specifically the reprieve of SO Romorantin in Championnat National 2), six District 1 teams previously exempted from the first round would need to play a first round tie on 21 August 2022.

The second round draw was also published on 20 July 2022, with 77 teams from divisions up to Régional 1 entering at this stage. The third round draw was published on 30 August 2022, with 10 teams from Championnat National 3 joining the 66 qualifiers from the second round for a total of 38 ties. The fourth round draw was published on 14 September 2022, with the 6 teams from Championnat National 2 joining at this stage. The fifth and sixth rounds were drawn together on 27 September 2022, with the two teams from Championnat National joining the competition at the fifth round stage.

=== First round ===
The first 52 matches were played on 15, 18 and 19 June 2022. Tiers refer to 2021–22 season. Three additional matches were played on 20 August 2022.

First round results: Centre-Val de Loire
Tie no	Home team (tier)	Score	Away team (tier)
1.	RC Bû Abondant (11)	5–2	AS Villemeux (10)
2.	FC Rémois (10)	3–1 (Note: FC Rémois penalised for fielding a suspended player. FC Lèves qualify.)	FC Lèves (10)
3.	Association Portugaise Dreux (11)	0–2	FJ Champhol (9)
4.	AS Tréon (11)	3–0	ES Jouy Saint-Prest (12)
5.	AS Châteauneuf-en-Thymerais (11)	2–2 (5–3 p)	CO Chérisy (10)
6.	SA Marboué (10)	2–6	FC Beauvoir (10)
7.	FREP Logron (12)	1–7	AS Nogent-le-Rotrou (10)
8.	US Cloyes-Droué (10)	1–3	CA Ouzouer-le-Marché (9)
9.	FC Lucé Ouest (10)	2–0	OC Châteaudun (9)
10.	RS Patay (12)	6–3	CS Aunay-sous-Auneau (10)
11.	CO Chillers-aux-Bois (12)	3–2	Auneau FC (11)
12.	FC Les Bords De l'Eure (11)	1–1 (6–7 p)	FC Nogent-le-Phaye (10)
13.	Loches AC (10)	1–0	FC Véretz-Azay-Larçay (10)
14.	US Saint-Martin-le-Beau (12)	5–3	AS Villiers-au-Bouin (9)
15.	OC Tours (10)	4–2	ASPO Tours (11)
16.	Football Choisille La Membrolle-Mettray (10)	2–1	AS Esvres (10)
17.	AS de l'Aubrière Saint-Pierre-des-Corps (11)	0–8	FA Saint-Symphorien Tours (11)
18.	AJS Théséenne (11)	1–5	SC La Croix-en-Touraine (11)
19.	AS Saint-Gervais-la-Forêt (10)	2–3	ES Cheverny Cour (10)
20.	US Renaudine (9)	7–2	AS Chailles Candé 99 (10)
21.	FC Val de Cissé (11)	3–0	CA Saint-Laurent-Nouan La Ferté-Saint-Cyr (10)
22.	US Chémery/Méhers/Saint-Romain (11)	0–2	ES Chargé (10)
23.	AC Amboise (11)	12–0	US Saint-Aignan Noyers (10)
24.	US Fougères Ouchamps Feings (11)	2–0	CA Dhuizon (12)
25.	ASPTT Orléans (11)	1–1 (4–1 p)	ES Loges et Forêt (9)
26.	US Saint-Cyr-en-Val (10)	4–2	ES Marigny (9)
27.	CD Espagnol Orléans (10)	5–1 (Note: Tie reversed from original draw.)	FC Magdunois (10)
28.	FC Saint-Denis-en-Val (11)	2–2 (5–4 p)	USS Portugais Orléans (10)
29.	US Cepoy-Corquilleroy (11)	1–0	La Fraternelle Nogent-sur-Vernisson (11)
30.	AS Gien (11)	1–2 (Note: FC Mandorais penalised for fielding a suspended player. AS Gien qualify.)	FC Mandorais (10)
31.	US Argy (11)	1–13	ES Genillé (11)
32.	SC Villeperdue (11)	6–0	AF Bouchardais (11)
33.	Reignac Chambourg Val d'Indre (11)	5–2	US Ports-Nouâtre (11)
34.	US Champigny-sur-Veude (12)	0–5	ES Val de Veude (11)
35.	AS Salbris (10)	4–3	CS Argent-sur-Sauldre (11)
36.	FC Portugais Selles-sur-Cher (10)	3–0 (Note: Tie won by means of forfeit.)	ES Villefranche (10)
37.	Bonny-Beaulieu FC (10)	0–2	US Les Aix-Rians (10)
38.	SS La Solognote Souesmes (11)	3–0	US Briare (11)
39.	Olympique Mehunois (10)	2–0	CS Foëcy (11)
40.	AS Ingrandes (11)	2–2 (4–3 p)	FC Sacierges-Saint-Martin Saint-Civran Roussines Prissac (12)
41.	FC Marche Occitane (10)	0–5	US Brenne-Vendoeuvres (10)
42.	FC Berry Touraine (10)	3–2	US Villedieu-sur-Indre (10)
43.	Étoile Châteauroux (10)	4–2	US Aigurande (9)
44.	FC Bas-Berry (11)	0–11	Avenir Lignières (9)
45.	SS Cluis (11)	3–4	EGC Touvent Châteauroux (9)
46.	FC Saint-Denis-de-Jouhet/Sarzay (11)	1–10 (Note: FC Saint-Denis-de-Jouhet/Sarzay penalised for fielding a suspended player, AS Ardentes qualify.)	AS Ardentes (11)
47.	US Charenton-du-Cher (10)	3–0	US Dun-sur-Auron (11)
48.	SC Châteauneuf-sur-Cher (10)	1–1 (6–5 p)	AS Chalivoy-Milon (11)
49.	AS Baugy (12)	2–2 (3–4 p)	US Saint-Florent-sur-Cher (10)
50.	AS Saint-Georges-de-Poisieux (11)	0–4	US Sainte-Solange (12)
51.	ES Brécy (11)	4–1	FR Ids-Saint-Roch (12)
52.	AS Chapelloise (9)	2–3	ES Sancoins (10)
53.	Neuville Sports (9)	6–0	CS Angerville-Pussay (9)
54.	SL Chaillot Vierzon (9)	2–3	US Reuilly (9)
55.	AS Chanceaux (9)	0–0 (4–3 p)	ES Vallée Verte (9)

=== Second round ===
These matches were played on 26, 27 and 28 August 2022.

Second round results: Centre-Val de Loire
Tie no	Home team (tier)	Score	Away team (tier)
1.	AS Châteauneuf-en-Thymerais (10)	0–2 (Note: AS Châteauneuf-en-Thymerais fielded a suspended player, and were penalised regardless of the scoreline in the game.)	CJF Fleury-les-Aubrais (8)
2.	CA Pithiviers (7)	3–3 (4–3 p)	AG Boigny-Chécy-Mardié (8)
3.	AS Nogent-le-Rotrou (10)	1–2	Amicale Épernon (7)
4.	FCM Ingré (8)	3–1	CS Mainvilliers (6)
5.	CO Chillers-aux-Bois (11)	2–3	AS Tréon (10)
6.	FC Lèves (9)	1–3	ACSF Dreux (8)
7.	RC Bû Abondant (11)	2–2 (2–4 p)	US Beaugency Val-de-Loire (8)
8.	US Vendôme (9)	1–4	US Mer (7)
9.	RS Patay (11)	2–4	SMOC Saint-Jean-de-Braye (6)
10.	AS Tout Horizon Dreux (9)	6–2	ES Nogent-le-Roi (8)
11.	FC Lucé Ouest (10)	1–3	US Vallée du Loir (9)
12.	FC Beauvoir (9)	1–0 (Note: FC Beauvoir penalised for fielding a suspended player, FC Nogent-le-Phaye qualify.)	FC Nogent-le-Phaye (10)
13.	FC Saint-Georges-sur-Eure (7)	1–2	SC Malesherbes (8)
14.	Dammarie Foot Bois-Gueslin (8)	0–2	ES Maintenon-Pierres (8)
15.	FJ Champhol (9)	0–1	Luisant AC' (8)
16.	Beauce FC (10) (Note: Beauce FC was formed in the summer of 2022, as a result of the merger of first round winner CA Ouzouer-le-Marché and another club.)	1–2	Neuville Sports (9)
17.	Avenir Ymonville (8)	0–0 (5–4 p)	Amicale de Lucé (8)
18.	SC Villeperdue (11)	1–2	Avenir Saint-Amand-Longpré (8)
19.	ASL Orchaise (8)	3–1	ES La Ville-aux-Dames (8)
20.	FA Saint-Symphorien Tours (11)	0–4	AS Monts (7)
21.	US Renaudine (9)	3–0	Racing La Riche-Tours (9)
22.	FC Pays Langeaisien (9)	0–3	US Monnaie (8)
23.	FC Val de Cissé (11)	2–4	AS Chouzy-Onzain (8)
24.	US Fougères Ouchamps Feings (12)	0–7	AC Amboise (10)
25.	AS Chanceaux (9)	4–2 (Note: Tie reversed from original draw.)	ES Bourgueil (9)
26.	ES Val de Veude (10)	0–3	CA Montrichard (8)
27.	ES Chargé (10)	4–0	Reignac Chambourg Val d'Indre (11)
28.	US Saint-Martin-le-Beau (11)	1–2	US Portugaise Joué-lès-Tours (7)
29.	Le Richelais (8)	1–3	ÉB Saint-Cyr-sur-Loire (6)
30.	SC La Croix-en-Touraine (11)	0–3 (Note: Tie won by means of forfeit.)	SC Azay-Cheillé (6)
31.	Football Choisille La Membrolle-Mettray (10)	2–2 (5–3 p)	US Chitenay-Cellettes (9)
32.	AC Portugal Tours (7)	2–1	AFC Blois (8)
33.	OC Tours (9)	1–1 (6–5 p)	Joué-lès-Tours FCT (6)
34.	ES Cheverny Cour (10)	0–5	SC Vatan (8)
35.	AC Parnac Val d'Abloux (10)	3–0	SA Issoudun (8)
36.	US Brenne-Vendoeuvres (9)	2–2 (3–2 p)	ES Poulaines (9)
37.	FC Pays Montrésorois (11) (Note: FC Pays Montésorois was formed in the summer of 2022 as the result of a merger between first round winner ES Genillé and two other clubs.)	0–4	US Le Blanc (7)
38.	Loches AC (9)	1–0	US La Châtre (9)
39.	FC Portugais Selles-sur-Cher (10)	5–3	SC Châteauneuf-sur-Cher (9)
40.	Étoile Châteauroux (9)	1–2	US Argenton Le Pêchereau (9)
41.	EGC Touvent Châteauroux (10)	1–0	AS Ingrandes (10)
42.	AS Ardentes (10)	0–5	US Le Poinçonnet (8)
43.	FC Diors (8)	2–0	US Saint-Maur (9)
44.	Avenir Lignières (10)	2–2 (5–6 p)	ACS Buzançais (9)
45.	Saint-Georges Descartes (8)	2–2 (3–4 p)	AS Contres (6)
46.	ASJ La Chaussée-Saint-Victor (8)	6–1	FC Levroux (9)
47.	ECF Bouzanne Vallée Noire (9)	0–1	US Montgivray (8)
48.	FC Berry Touraine (10)	0–4	AC Villers-les-Ormes (8)
49.	ASC Portugais Blois (8)	1–1 (3–4 p)	FC Déolois (6)
50.	ES Brécy (11)	1–2	US Cepoy-Corquilleroy (11)
51.	US Sainte-Solange (11)	1–2	AS Saint-Germain-du-Puy (8)
52.	US Saint-Cyr-en-Val (9)	1–4	USM Olivet (7)
53.	ES Sancoins (11)	0–1	US Charenton-du-Cher (10)
54.	Olympique Mehunois (9)	1–0	AS Saint-Amandoise (7)
55.	ES Trouy (8)	4–0	AS Portugais Bourges (7)
56.	US Reuilly (9)	4–0	EAS Orval (9)
57.	US Les Aix-Rians (10)	0–6	ES Moulon Bourges (6)
58.	Olympique Portugais Mehun-sur-Yèvre (8)	0–0 (1–4 p)	Vineuil SF (6)
59.	ASPTT Orléans (11)	2–3	FC Fussy-Saint-Martin-Vigneux (7)
60.	FC Saint-Denis-en-Val (10)	1–3	J3S Amilly (6)
61.	US Saint-Florent-sur-Cher (10)	2–3 (Note: SC Massay penalised for fielding a suspended player, US Saint-Florent-sur-Cher qualify.)	SC Massay (8)
62.	AS Salbris (10)	0–1	Gazélec Bourges (8)
63.	ESCALE Orléans (9)	1–3	FC Saint-Doulchard (7)
64.	Diables Rouges Selles-Saint-Denis (9)	3–0	AS Gien (10)
65.	ES Gatinaise (9)	2–1	SS La Solognote Souesmes (10)
66.	CD Espagnol Orléans (10)	2–2 (3–4 p)	CSM Sully-sur-Loire (8)

=== Third round ===
These matches were played on 10 and 11 September 2022.

Third round results: Centre-Val de Loire
Tie no	Home team (tier)	Score	Away team (tier)
1.	US Beaugency Val-de-Loire (8)	3–4	SMOC Saint-Jean-de-Braye (6)
2.	AS Chanceaux (9)	2–2 (3–1 p)	ES Gatinaise (9)
3.	Avenir Saint-Amand-Longpré (8)	1–3	US Châteauneuf-sur-Loire (5)
4.	FC Nogent-le-Phaye (10)	0–2	Luisant AC (8)
5.	US Vallée du Loir (9)	1–9	Football Choisille La Membrolle-Mettray (10)
6.	ES Chargé (10)	1–1 (9–8 p)	AC Portugal Tours (7)
7.	ACSF Dreux (8)	1–1 (2–4 p)	SC Malesherbes (8)
8.	US Cepoy-Corquilleroy (11)	0–5	Neuville Sports (9)
9.	AS Tréon (10)	0–3	J3S Amilly (6)
10.	FC Drouais (5)	4–0	USM Saran (5)
11.	CSM Sully-sur-Loire (8)	3–1	AS Tout Horizon Dreux (9)
12.	US Renaudine (9)	2–0	Avenir Ymonville (8)
13.	US Monnaie (8)	2–3	USM Olivet (7)
14.	AS Chouzy-Onzain (8)	2–2 (4–1 p)	ASL Orchaise (8)
15.	ES Maintenon-Pierres (8)	2–2 (4–5 p)	FCM Ingré (8)
16.	Vineuil SF (6)	4–0	ÉB Saint-Cyr-sur-Loire (6)
17.	CJF Fleury-les-Aubrais (8)	2–2 (0–3 p)	FC Saint-Jean-le-Blanc (5)
18.	US Mer (7)	5–3	Amicale Épernon (7)
19.	CA Pithiviers (7)	2–0	USM Montargis (5)
20.	EGC Touvent Châteauroux (10)	2–1	ES Moulon Bourges (6)
21.	SC Vatan (8)	0–2	AS Contres (6)
22.	Gazélec Bourges (8)	3–2	FC Diors (8)
23.	US Charenton-du-Cher (10)	1–2	OC Tours (9)
24.	US Montgivray (8)	2–2 (4–3 p)	US Le Poinçonnet (8)
25.	AC Villers-les-Ormes (8)	4–1	ASJ La Chaussée-Saint-Victor (8)
26.	US Reuilly (9)	5–0	Diables Rouges Selles-Saint-Denis (9)
27.	AS Monts (7)	0–6	FC Déolois (6)
28.	US Portugaise Joué-lès-Tours (7)	4–1	ES Trouy (8)
29.	AC Parnac Val d'Abloux (10)	3–0	US Saint-Florent-sur-Cher (10)
30.	Loches AC (9)	1–8	FC Montlouis (5)
31.	FC Ouest Tourangeau (5)	4–0	SC Azay-Cheillé (6)
32.	FC Fussy-Saint-Martin-Vigneux (7)	0–2	Chambray FC (5)
33.	AC Amboise (10)	2–1	US Le Blanc (7)
34.	AS Saint-Germain-du-Puy (8)	1–2 (Note: AS Saint-Germain-du-Puy penalised for fielding a suspended player.)	US Argenton Le Pêchereau (9)
35.	ACS Buzançais (9)	0–2	FC Saint-Doulchard (7)
36.	US Brenne-Vendoeuvres (9)	2–3	FC Portugais Selles-sur-Cher (10)
37.	CA Montrichard (8)	0–2	Tours FC (5)
38.	Olympique Mehunois (9)	0–7	Avoine OCC (5)

=== Fourth round ===
These matches were played on 24 and 25 September 2022.

Fourth round results: Centre-Val de Loire
Tie no	Home team (tier)	Score	Away team (tier)
1.	US Mer (7)	0–1	Vineuil SF (6)
2.	Football Choisille La Membrolle-Mettray (10)	1–4	FC Saint-Jean-le-Blanc (5)
3.	C'Chartres Football (4)	1–1 (2–4 p)	FC Drouais (5)
4.	AS Chanceaux (9)	1–3	USM Olivet (7)
5.	CSM Sully-sur-Loire (8)	2–0	SMOC Saint-Jean-de-Braye (6)
6.	ES Chargé (10)	0–7	US Châteauneuf-sur-Loire (5)
7.	Neuville Sports (9)	0–0 (5–3 p)	CA Pithiviers (7)
8.	J3S Amilly (6)	1–1 (4–2 p)	Blois Football 41 (4)
9.	US Renaudine (9)	0–4	FC Montlouis (5)
10.	Luisant AC (8)	2–0	FCM Ingré (8)
11.	SC Malesherbes (8)	1–2	Saint-Pryvé Saint-Hilaire FC (4)
12.	AC Amboise (10)	0–2	FC Déolois (6)
13.	OC Tours (9)	3–3 (1–4 p)	US Portugaise Joué-lès-Tours (7)
14.	AC Villers-les-Ormes (8)	0–0 (3–0 p)	FC Ouest Tourangeau (5)
15.	US Reuilly (9)	0–2	Vierzon FC (4)
16.	AC Parnac Val d'Abloux (10)	1–5	FC Saint-Doulchard (7)
17.	US Argenton Le Pêchereau (9)	1–5	AS Contres (6)
18.	Bourges Foot 18 (4)	2–2 (5–4 p)	Chambray FC (5)
19.	Tours FC (5)	0–1	SO Romorantin (4)
20.	Gazélec Bourges (8)	3–4	Avoine OCC (5)
21.	US Montgivray (8)	1–2	AS Chouzy-Onzain (8)
22.	FC Portugais Selles-sur-Cher (10)	1–1 (5–4 p)	EGC Touvent Châteauroux (10)

=== Fifth round ===
These matches were played on 8 and 9 October 2022.

Fifth round results: Centre-Val de Loire
Tie no	Home team (tier)	Score	Away team (tier)
1.	Vineuil SF (6)	1–3	Saint-Pryvé Saint-Hilaire FC (4)
2.	CSM Sully-sur-Loire (8)	0–1	US Châteauneuf-sur-Loire (5)
3.	SO Romorantin (4)	2–0	FC Saint-Jean-le-Blanc (5)
4.	USM Olivet (7)	4–0	Luisant AC (8)
5.	FC Drouais (5)	1–2	J3S Amilly (6)
6.	Neuville Sports (9)	0–5	US Orléans (3)
7.	US Portugaise Joué-lès-Tours (7)	2–2 (4–5 p)	FC Saint-Doulchard (7)
8.	AS Contres (6)	0–3	Bourges Foot 18 (4)
9.	FC Montlouis (5)	0–1	Avoine OCC (5)
10.	FC Portugais Selles-sur-Cher (10)	2–1	AC Villers-les-Ormes (8)
11.	FC Déolois (6)	0–1	Vierzon FC (4)
12.	AS Chouzy-Onzain (8)	0–5	LB Châteauroux (3)

=== Sixth round ===
These matches were played on 15 and 16 October 2022.

Sixth round results: Centre-Val de Loire
Tie no	Home team (tier)	Score	Away team (tier)
1.	FC Portugais Selles-sur-Cher (10)	0–2	FC Saint-Doulchard (7)
2.	Bourges Foot 18 (4)	5–1	US Châteauneuf-sur-Loire (5)
3.	Vierzon FC (4)	2–0	SO Romorantin (4)
4.	J3S Amilly (6)	1–5	LB Châteauroux (3)
5.	Avoine OCC (5)	1–1 (8–7 p)	US Orléans (3)
6.	USM Olivet (7)	1–5	Saint-Pryvé Saint-Hilaire FC (4)
