= 2025–26 Coupe de France preliminary rounds, Centre-Val de Loire =

The 2025–26 Coupe de France preliminary rounds, Centre-Val de Loire is the qualifying competition to decide which teams from the leagues of the Centre-Val de Loire region of France take part in the main competition from the seventh round.

A total of six teams will qualify from the Centre-Val de Loire preliminary rounds.

In 2024–25, Tours FC progressed to the round of 64, to be the last team standing from the region. However, they were removed from the competition at this stage after being held responsibility for the cancellation of the scheduled match against FC Lorient.

== Draws and fixtures ==
On 21 July 2025, the league published the structure of the preliminary rounds, and noted that 261 teams from the region had entered the competition. The ties for the first two rounds of the competition were also published on the same day. The first round draw saw 200 teams enter, including all teams from departmental divisions and 16 from the third division of the regional league. The second round draw saw 50 additional teams enter, including all remaining teams from regional divisions. The five teams from the region that participate in Championnat National 3 entered the competition at the third round stage, the draw for which was published on 4 September 2025. The draw for the fourth round, featuring the four teams from Championnat National 2, was carried out on 16 September 2025. The fifth round draw, which included the two sides from Championnat National, took place on 1 October 2025. The sixth round draw was published on 14 October 2025.

=== First round ===
These matches were played on 24 August 2025.

First Round Results: Centre-Val de Loire
Tie no	Home team (Tier)	Score	Away team (Tier)
1.	FC Loupéen (11)	0–4	US Vallée du Loir (9)
2.	Amicale Gallardon (10)	5–2	UP Illiers-Combray (10)
3.	AS Tréon (10)	6–0	FC Beauvoir (10)
4.	SA Marboué (11)	0–6	AS Villemeux (10)
5.	RS Patay (11)	1–1 (1–3 p)	ACSF Dreux (9)
6.	OC Châteaudun (11)	0–2	FC Lèves (9)
7.	RC Bû Abondant (11)	0–4	US Pontoise Saint-Denis-les-Ponts (10)
8.	AS Châteauneuf-en-Thymerais (9)	2–0	ES Beauceronne (9)
9.	Amicale Courvilloise (10)	2–4	AS Nogent-le-Rotrou (9)
10.	ALEP Saint-Ouen (9)	2–3	AS Tout Horizon Dreux (8)
11.	ÉS Jouy Saint-Prest (12)	4–1	ES Naveil Thoré Villiers Azé Lunay (10)
12.	US Brezolles (9)	0–2	US Petite Beauce (8)
13.	FC Chouzé-sur-Loire (12)	0–3	US Renaudine (10)
14.	FC Gâtine Choisilles (10)	4–2	Val de Brenne FC (9)
15.	ES Chargé (10)	5–2	US Lignières Bréhémont (10)
16.	AS Villedômer (11)	1–5	FC Pays Langeaisien (10)
17.	FC Val de Cher 37 (10)	0–8	ES Bourgueil (9)
18.	FC Val de Cissé (11)	0–3 (Note: Tie won by means of forfeit.)	ES La Ville-aux-Dames (8)
19.	US Chémery/Méhers/Saint-Romain (11)	1–4	AS Esvres (11)
20.	ASJ La Chaussée-Saint-Victor (9)	2–1	OC Tours (10)
21.	ES Cheverny Cour-Cheverny (11)	1–0	US Cléré (12)
22.	ASL Orchaise (9)	1–3	Racing La Riche-Tours (9)
23.	AJS Mont/Bracieux (12)	1–4	ÉS Oésienne (10)
24.	FC Véretz-Azay-Larçay (10)	3–3 (3–0 p)	US Fougères Ouchamps Feings (10)
25.	US Saint-Aignan Noyers (10)	2–0	US Pernay (11)
26.	Avenir Saint-Amand-Longpré (9)	2–1	AS Chanceaux (9)
27.	FC Souvigné Villiers Saint-Laurent (10)	1–3	ES Stade Montoirien Saint-Martin (10)
28.	ÉS Villebarou (10)	4–2	Obee Joué FC (11)
29.	US Saint-Martin-le-Beau (10)	1–2	US Saint-Georges-sur-Cher (9)
30.	Saint-Étienne-de-Chigny FC (11)	3–1	AS Suèvres (11)
31.	US Chitenay-Cellettes (9)	0–1	AS Luynes (10)
32.	FC Pays Montrésorois (11)	1–1 (4–3 p)	Football Saint-Benoit Huismes (10)
33.	AFC Blois (9)	1–3	FA Saint-Symphorien Tours (10)
34.	FC Thenay-Pontlevoy-Sambin (12)	0–3	FC Étoile Verte (10)
35.	AC Chambord (11)	2–2 (2–4 p)	CS Tourangeau Veigné (10)
36.	Saint-Avertin Sports (10)	1–2	AS Saint-Gervais (10)
37.	AS Fondettes (9)	2–1	Cher-Sologne Football (9)
38.	Union Saint-Romain-Pouillé-Mareuil (11)	1–5	SC Benais (11)
39.	SS Bélâbre (10)	1–2	SC Massay (9)
40.	Graçay Genouilly Sports (11)	2–1	Espérance Le Pont-Chrétien-Chabenet (10)
41.	ASFR Saint-Hilaire-de-Court (11)	1–2	FC Martizay Mézières Tournon (9)
42.	JS La Montagne Saint-Georges-sur-la-Prée (11)	1–2	AC Villers-les-Ormes (10)
43.	AC Parnac Val d'Abloux (9)	0–5	USA Lury/Méreau (8)
44.	AS Coings Céré (11)	0–6	AS Sainte-Catherine-de-Fierbois (11)
45.	FC Sainte-Maure-Maillé (10)	6–0	US Pruniers (10)
46.	FC Levroux (10)	2–1	ÉS Val de Veude (10)
47.	ES Poulaines (9)	2–1	Loches AC (9)
48.	Saint-Georges Descartes (9)	0–5	Foot Sud 41 (8)
49.	US Ports-Nouâtre (11)	1–6	FC Portugais Selles-sur-Cher (8)
50.	AS Saint-Gaultier-Thenay (10)	5–3	US Gâtines (10)
51.	FC Marche Occitane (10)	0–3	US Reuilly (8)
52.	AF Bouchardais (11)	0–4	ACS Buzançais (9)
53.	US Antogny-le-Tillac (12)	0–6	AS Chabris (10)
54.	FC Berry Touraine (12)	1–6	Diables Rouges Selles-Saint-Denis (9)
55.	SC Villeperdue (11)	0–2	SS Écueilloise (9)
56.	AS Brion (11)	1–2	US Brenne-Vendoeuvres (11)
57.	AS Niherne (11)	0–3	FC Sacierges-Saint-Martin/Saint-Civran/Roussines/Prissac (10)
58.	SA Issoudun (12)	1–7	US Yzeures Preuilly (9)
59.	JL Val de Creuse (11)	0–5	FC Étoile Châteauroux (10)
60.	FC Velles-Arthon-La Pérouille 36 (10)	2–3	ES Vineuil Brion (11)
61.	US Azay-le-Ferron (11)	1–1 (1–3 p)	US Villedieu-sur-Indre (8)
62.	FC Artenay Chevilly (10)	2–0	Entente Nancray Chambon Nibelle (8)
63.	ES Gâtinaise (10)	0–3	FC Lucé Ouest (10)
64.	US Cepoy-Corquilleroy (10)	3–0	Auneau FC (11)
65.	US Beaune-la-Rolande/Corbeilles (10)	1–1 (4–5 p)	Luisant AC (9)
66.	SS Sermaises (11)	1–0	Avenir Ymonville (8)
67.	Amicale Sours (10)	2–3	CA Pithiviers (8)
68.	FC Les Bords De l'Eure (10)	2–4	US Turcs Chalette (9)
69.	FC Nogent-le-Phaye (10)	2–1	US Chalette (10)
70.	AS Bigny-Vallenay (11)	3–1	SS Cluis (11)
71.	CSM Sully-sur-Loire (9)	3–1	CS Argent-sur-Sauldre (10)
72.	ÉS Meung-Baule (10)	0–1	SS La Solognote Souesmes (9)
73.	Ormes Saint-Péravy FC (10)	2–2 (2–4 p)	AS Nouan-Lamotte (9)
74.	SL Chaillot Vierzon (9)	0–2	US Saint-Cyr-en-Val (9)
75.	ES Aubigny (9)	1–1 (5–4 p)	Jargeau-Saint-Denis FC (9)
76.	US Poilly-Autry (11)	5–0	AS Saint-Benoît-sur-Loire (11)
77.	COS Marcilly-en-Villette (10)	6–1	US Theillay (11)
78.	AS Salbris (11)	1–13	CD Espagnol Orléans (8)
79.	Union Portugaise SS Orléans (9)	3–1	FC Val de Loire (10)
80.	ASL Allouis (10)	2–4	ES Marigny (9)
81.	RC Châtillon-sur-Loire (11)	1–2	US Sandillon (10)
82.	ALS Léré (10)	3–0	FC Coullons-Cerdon (11)
83.	Bonny-Beaulieu FC (11)	2–1	FC Semoy (9)
84.	ÉS Villefranche-sur-Cher (10)	7–2	US Beaugency Val-de-Loire (10)
85.	AS Ardentes (9)	2–0	US Sainte-Solange (10)
86.	US La Châtre (9)	0–1	AS Saint-Germain-du-Puy (8)
87.	EGC Touvent Châteauroux (8)	0–2	AS Chapelloise (8)
88.	ÉS Marçais (11)	1–5	US Montgivray (9)
89.	AS Chalivoy-Milon (11)	0–2	US Aigurande (9)
90.	US Saint-Florent-sur-Cher (9)	4–2	FC Diors (9)
91.	FC Vasselay-Saint Éloy-de-Gy (10)	4–2	CS Vignoux (10)
92.	ES Étrechet (11)	1–0	FC Nerondes (10)
93.	US Henrichemont Menetou-Salon (10)	0–2	Olympique Mehunois (10)
94.	US Dun-sur-Auron (11)	1–5	US Saint-Maur (9)
95.	ÉS Colombiers (10)	1–6	ECF Bouzanne Vallée Noire (9)
96.	La Patriote Ambrault (11)	0–2	Châteauneuf Levet Lignières Foot (9)
97.	FC Fussy-Saint-Martin-Vignoux (10)	1–0	Gazélec Bourges (9)
98.	AAE Nohant-Vic (11)	0–1	ES Sancoins (9)
99.	ECL Saint-Christophe (11)	4–0	FC Avord (11)
100.	FC Saint-Denis-de-Jouhet/Sarzay (11)	1–5	Olympique Loire Val d'Aubois (11)

=== Second round ===
These matches were played on 29, 30 and 31 August 2025.

Second Round Results: Centre-Val de Loire
Tie no	Home team (Tier)	Score	Away team (Tier)
1.	FC Lèves (9)	1–0	US Vendôme (7)
2.	US Pontoise Saint-Denis-les-Ponts (10)	0–1	FC Drouais (6)
3.	US Vallée du Loir (9)	0–1	AS Tréon (10)
4.	ÉS Jouy Saint-Prest (12)	0–4	ES Maintenon-Pierres (7)
5.	ES Nogent-le-Roi (8)	0–2	Amicale Épernon (8)
6.	Amicale Gallardon (10)	1–2	AS Tout Horizon Dreux (8)
7.	AS Villemeux (10)	2–3	Amicale de Lucé (8)
8.	US Petite Beauce (8)	1–3	ACSF Dreux (9)
9.	AS Nogent-le-Rotrou (9)	2–1	AS Châteauneuf-en-Thymerais (9)
10.	CA Saint-Laurent-Nouan La Ferté-Saint-Cyr (8)	0–3	Avoine OCC (6)
11.	AS Luynes (10)	3–1	AS Saint-Gervais (10)
12.	US Renaudine (10)	2–2 (0–3 p)	Avenir Saint-Amand-Longpré (9)
13.	ES Bourgueil (9)	2–2 (2–3 p)	AC Portugal Tours (7)
14.	US Saint-Aignan Noyers (10)	2–10	US Portugaise Joué-lès-Tours (7)
15.	FC Gâtine Choisilles (10)	0–6	AS Contres (7)
16.	AS Monts (8)	1–3	Vineuil SF (6)
17.	AS Esvres (11)	0–6	SC Azay-Cheillé (6)
18.	ASJ La Chaussée-Saint-Victor (9)	2–2 (4–2 p)	ES Chargé (10)
19.	US Saint-Georges-sur-Cher (9)	0–5	ÉB Saint-Cyr-sur-Loire (6)
20.	FC Pays Langeaisien (10)	1–1 (5–4 p)	FC Véretz-Azay-Larçay (10)
21.	US Mer (8)	6–0 (Note: Tie reversed from original draw.)	ES Cheverny Cour-Cheverny (11)
22.	FC Pays Montrésorois (11)	2–4	AS Chouzy-Onzain (8)
23.	SC Benais (11)	0–12	Racing La Riche-Tours (9)
24.	ES Stade Montoirien Saint-Martin (10)	0–1	ES La Ville-aux-Dames (8)
25.	Chambray FC (7)	3–4	AC Amboise (8)
26.	FA Saint-Symphorien Tours (10)	1–2	US Monnaie (6)
27.	ÉS Oésienne (10)	1–5	AS Fondettes (9)
28.	Saint-Étienne-de-Chigny FC (11)	3–0	ÉS Villebarou (10)
29.	CS Tourangeau Veigné (10)	1–1 (4–5 p)	FC Étoile Verte (10)
30.	SC Massay (9)	2–2 (2–4 p)	AS Saint-Gaultier-Thenay (10)
31.	SS Écueilloise (9)	2–0	FC Sainte-Maure-Maillé (10)
32.	Graçay Genouilly Sports (11)	0–4	US Reuilly (8)
33.	US Brenne-Vendoeuvres (11)	1–5	US Villedieu-sur-Indre (8)
34.	ES Vineuil Brion (11)	0–6	USA Lury/Méreau (8)
35.	ACS Buzançais (9)	4–6	FC Portugais Selles-sur-Cher (8)
36.	US Le Blanc (7)	2–1	SC Vatan (8)
37.	FC Martizay Mézières Tournon (9)	0–2	Diables Rouges Selles-Saint-Denis (9)
38.	FC Sacierges-Saint-Martin/Saint-Civran/Roussines/Prissac (10)	3–3 (10–9 p)	CA Montrichard (8)
39.	AS Chabris (10)	1–3	Le Richelais (8)
40.	FC Étoile Châteauroux (10)	0–9	US Yzeures Preuilly (9)
41.	ES Poulaines (9)	0–1	US Argenton Le Pêchereau (8)
42.	AC Villers-les-Ormes (10)	0–3	Foot Sud 41 (8)
43.	AS Sainte-Catherine-de-Fierbois (11)	2–4	FC Levroux (10)
44.	CSM Sully-sur-Loire (9)	0–4	US Châteauneuf-sur-Loire (6)
45.	US Saint-Cyr-en-Val (9)	1–9	FC Saint-Jean-le-Blanc (6)
46.	ALS Léré (10)	0–12	SMOC Saint-Jean-de-Braye (7)
47.	Bonny-Beaulieu FC (11)	0–5	CJF Fleury-les-Aubrais (6)
48.	FCM Ingré (7)	3–0	FC Saint-Doulchard (7)
49.	AG Boigny-Chécy-Mardié (8)	3–5	Olympique Portugais Mehun-sur-Yèvre (7)
50.	US Sandillon (10)	0–4	USM Olivet (7)
51.	ES Marigny (9)	1–4	US Dampierre-en-Burly (8)
52.	ES Aubigny (9)	1–2	Union Portugaise SS Orléans (9)
53.	COS Marcilly-en-Villette (10)	2–3	ÉS Villefranche-sur-Cher (10)
54.	US Poilly-Autry (11)	0–4	SS La Solognote Souesmes (9)
55.	AS Nouan-Lamotte (9)	1–2	CD Espagnol Orléans (8)
56.	FC Vasselay-Saint Éloy-de-Gy (10)	4–3	FC Saint-Amand Orval (8)
57.	US Le Poinçonnet (8)	5–1	ES Moulon Bourges (6)
58.	US Charenton-du-Cher (8)	0–3	FC Déolois (7)
59.	AS Ardentes (9)	1–3	ES Trouy (7)
60.	ES Étrechet (11)	1–1 (2–3 p)	ECF Bouzanne Vallée Noire (9)
61.	Châteauneuf Levet Lignières Foot (9)	3–4	AS Portugais Bourges (7)
62.	AS Bigny-Vallenay (11)	0–4	AS Saint-Germain-du-Puy (8)
63.	Olympique Loire Val d'Aubois (11)	0–1	Olympique Mehunois (10)
64.	ES Sancoins (9)	0–3	US Montgivray (9)
65.	FC Fussy-Saint-Martin-Vignoux (10)	0–6	AS Chapelloise (8)
66.	ECL Saint-Christophe (11)	0–2	US Aigurande (9)
67.	US Saint-Maur (9)	3–0	US Saint-Florent-sur-Cher (9)
68.	FC Artenay Chevilly (10)	2–2 (4–5 p)	FC Saint-Georges-sur-Eure (8)
69.	Dammarie Foot Bois-Gueslin (8)	1–1 (1–4 p)	J3S Amilly (7)
70.	Neuville Sports (8)	0–1	CS Mainvilliers (6)
71.	SS Sermaises (11)	0–8	USM Montargis (7)
72.	Luisant AC (9)	1–1 (3–5 p)	SC Malesherbes (7)
73.	CA Pithiviers (8)	3–1	US Turcs Chalette (9)
74.	US Cepoy-Corquilleroy (10)	0–0 (1–3 p)	FC Mandorais (8)
75.	FC Lucé Ouest (10)	0–3	FC Nogent-le-Phaye (10)

=== Third round ===
These matches were played on 13 and 14 September 2025.

Third Round Results: Centre-Val de Loire
Tie no	Home team (Tier)	Score	Away team (Tier)
1.	ACSF Dreux (9)	0–4	Vineuil SF (6)
2.	Amicale de Lucé (8)	2–4	FC Saint-Jean-le-Blanc (6)
3.	CD Espagnol Orléans (8)	5–1	AS Nogent-le-Rotrou (9)
4.	SO Romorantin (5)	8–0	CS Mainvilliers (6)
5.	Avenir Saint-Amand-Longpré (9)	5–2	ÉS Villefranche-sur-Cher (10)
6.	FC Portugais Selles-sur-Cher (8)	0–5	C'Chartres Football (5)
7.	ASJ La Chaussée-Saint-Victor (9)	1–1 (3–5 p)	CJF Fleury-les-Aubrais (6)
8.	Diables Rouges Selles-Saint-Denis (9)	1–4	FC Drouais (6)
9.	SMOC Saint-Jean-de-Braye (7)	2–2 (5–3 p)	FCM Ingré (7)
10.	FC Saint-Georges-sur-Eure (8)	2–2 (1–3 p)	Saran FC (5)
11.	AS Tout Horizon Dreux (8)	2–4	FC Lèves (9)
12.	Amicale Épernon (8)	1–4	USM Montargis (7)
13.	USM Olivet (7)	5–1	CA Pithiviers (8)
14.	Foot Sud 41 (8)	0–2	AS Contres (7)
15.	AS Tréon (10)	1–2	J3S Amilly (7)
16.	US Dampierre-en-Burly (8)	3–0	SS La Solognote Souesmes (9)
17.	ES Maintenon-Pierres (7)	1–3	AS Chouzy-Onzain (8)
18.	FC Mandorais (8)	1–2	US Châteauneuf-sur-Loire (6)
19.	FC Nogent-le-Phaye (10)	0–4	SC Malesherbes (7)
20.	Union Portugaise SS Orléans (9)	0–2	US Mer (8)
21.	FC Vasselay-Saint Éloy-de-Gy (10)	0–5	US Monnaie (6)
22.	Avoine OCC (6)	4–0	US Portugaise Joué-lès-Tours (7)
23.	Racing La Riche-Tours (9)	4–0	SS Écueilloise (9)
24.	FC Sacierges-Saint-Martin/Saint-Civran/Roussines/Prissac (10)	0–1	SC Azay-Cheillé (6)
25.	ES La Ville-aux-Dames (8)	0–4	ES Trouy (7)
26.	US Aigurande (9)	2–3	AS Luynes (10)
27.	FC Levroux (10)	1–6	Olympique Portugais Mehun-sur-Yèvre (7)
28.	USA Lury/Méreau (8)	1–5	US Argenton Le Pêchereau (8)
29.	US Montgivray (9)	3–1	Olympique Mehunois (10)
30.	FC Déolois (7)	1–3	US Le Blanc (7)
31.	FC Pays Langeaisien (10)	1–2	Saint-Étienne-de-Chigny FC (11)
32.	FC Étoile Verte (10)	0–6	US Yzeures Preuilly (9)
33.	US Saint-Maur (9)	0–2	AS Portugais Bourges (7)
34.	AS Chapelloise (8)	0–1	ÉB Saint-Cyr-sur-Loire (6)
35.	AS Fondettes (9)	1–4	Vierzon FC (5)
36.	AS Saint-Gaultier-Thenay (10)	0–3	Le Richelais (8)
37.	AS Saint-Germain-du-Puy (8)	0–5	UF Touraine (5)
38.	AC Amboise (8)	5–0	US Villedieu-sur-Indre (8)
39.	ECF Bouzanne Vallée Noire (9)	0–5	US Le Poinçonnet (8)
40.	US Reuilly (8)	1–6	AC Portugal Tours (7)

=== Fourth round ===
These matches were played on 27 and 28 September 2025.

Fourth Round Results: Centre-Val de Loire
Tie no	Home team (Tier)	Score	Away team (Tier)
1.	FC Lèves (9)	2–1	USM Montargis (7)
2.	Avenir Saint-Amand-Longpré (9)	0–3	Saran FC (5)
3.	SC Malesherbes (7)	3–2	SMOC Saint-Jean-de-Braye (7)
4.	J3S Amilly (7)	0–7	Saint-Pryvé Saint-Hilaire FC (4)
5.	AC Amboise (8)	1–3	FC Drouais (6)
6.	FC Saint-Jean-le-Blanc (6)	1–3	AS Contres (7)
7.	AS Chouzy-Onzain (8)	1–1 (4–5 p)	US Dampierre-en-Burly (8)
8.	US Mer (8)	3–3 (3–4 p)	US Châteauneuf-sur-Loire (6)
9.	Racing La Riche-Tours (9)	0–5	C'Chartres Football (5)
10.	CD Espagnol Orléans (8)	0–5	Blois Football 41 (4)
11.	Vineuil SF (6)	4–2	CJF Fleury-les-Aubrais (6)
12.	Le Richelais (8)	2–1	AS Portugais Bourges (7)
13.	US Montgivray (9)	0–3	SC Azay-Cheillé (6)
14.	US Monnaie (6)	1–3	SO Romorantin (5)
15.	USM Olivet (7)	0–4	UF Touraine (5)
16.	US Argenton Le Pêchereau (8)	0–3	US Le Poinçonnet (8)
17.	US Le Blanc (7)	1–1 (5–3 p)	ÉB Saint-Cyr-sur-Loire (6)
18.	ES Trouy (7)	0–1	Avoine OCC (6)
19.	Vierzon FC (5)	3–3 (5–6 p)	Bourges FC (4)
20.	AS Luynes (10)	0–1	US Yzeures Preuilly (9)
21.	Saint-Étienne-de-Chigny FC (11)	1–4	Olympique Portugais Mehun-sur-Yèvre (7)
22.	AC Portugal Tours (7)	1–3	FC Montlouis (4)

=== Fifth round ===
These matches were played on 11 and 12 October 2025.

Fifth Round Results: Centre-Val de Loire
Tie no	Home team (Tier)	Score	Away team (Tier)
1.	AS Contres (7)	1–1 (5–3 p)	Saint-Pryvé Saint-Hilaire FC (4)
2.	FC Lèves (9)	0–4	US Orléans (3)
3.	US Dampierre-en-Burly (8)	0–6	FC Drouais (6)
4.	Saran FC (5)	1–3	C'Chartres Football (5)
5.	US Châteauneuf-sur-Loire (6)	0–1	Vineuil SF (6)
6.	SC Malesherbes (7)	0–5	Blois Football 41 (4)
7.	US Yzeures Preuilly (9)	0–4	UF Touraine (5)
8.	US Le Poinçonnet (8)	4–1	Le Richelais (8)
9.	FC Montlouis (4)	1–0	Bourges FC (4)
10.	US Le Blanc (7)	1–4	SO Romorantin (5)
11.	Olympique Portugais Mehun-sur-Yèvre (7)	0–5	LB Châteauroux (3)
12.	SC Azay-Cheillé (6)	1–1 (3–4 p)	Avoine OCC (6)

=== Sixth round ===
These matches were played on 25 and 26 October 2025.

Sixth Round Results: Centre-Val de Loire
Tie no	Home team (Tier)	Score	Away team (Tier)
1.	US Le Poinçonnet (8)	1–1 (3–2 p)	FC Drouais (6)
2.	C'Chartres Football (5)	1–3	Blois Football 41 (4)
3.	SO Romorantin (5)	4–1	Avoine OCC (6)
4.	AS Contres (7)	0–4	LB Châteauroux (3)
5.	Vineuil SF (6)	0–3	US Orléans (3)
6.	UF Touraine (5)	1–0	FC Montlouis (4)
