= 2024–25 Coupe de France preliminary rounds, Centre-Val de Loire =

The 2024–25 Coupe de France preliminary rounds, Centre-Val de Loire was the qualifying competition to decide which teams from the leagues of the Centre-Val de Loire region of France took part in the main competition from the seventh round.

A total of six teams qualified from the Centre-Val de Loire preliminary rounds.

In 2023–24, three sides from the region progressed to the round of 32. US Orléans and LB Châteauroux were both defeated by Ligue 1 opposition in Paris Saint-Germain and Le Havre respectively. SO Romorantin were defeated by AS Saint-Priest, from one league below them.

== Draws and fixtures ==
The league published the draw for the first two rounds on 19 July 2024, with the structure of these rounds indicating 260 clubs from the region had entered the competition. The first round consisted of 93 ties, featuring all but one district-level teams. The second round draw saw all the regional-level teams, and the remaining district-level team enter, with a total of 77 ties drawn. The third round, drawn on 5 September 2024, saw the entry of the nine Championnat National 3 teams from the region. The fourth round, drawn on 18 September 2024, saw the entry of the three Championnat National 2 teams from the region. The fifth round, drawn on 2 October 2024, saw the entry of the single Championnat National team from the region. The sixth round was drawn on 16 October 2024.

=== First round ===
These matches were played on 24 and 25 August 2024.

First Round Results: Centre-Val de Loire
Tie no	Home team (Tier)	Score	Away team (Tier)
1.	AS Châteauneuf-en-Thymerais (9)	3–1	Amicale Courvilloise (10)
2.	FC Rémois (11)	1–2	AS Tréon (10)
3.	AS Villemeux (10)	3–4	US Brezolles (9)
4.	RC Bû Abondant (11)	1–4	FC Lèves (9)
5.	Amicale Gallardon (10)	3–0	FC Loupéen (11)
6.	US Petite Beauce (9)	9–0	FC Beauvoir (9)
7.	US Vallée du Loir (10)	4–2	ALEP Saint-Ouen (10)
8.	OC Châteaudun (11)	1–4	AS Nogent-le-Rotrou (9)
9.	SA Marboué (10)	5–3	US Pontoise Saint-Denis-les-Ponts (10)
10.	RS Patay (12)	3–3 (2–4 p)	ES Beauceronne (9)
11.	ES Naveil Thoré Villiers Azé Lunay (11)	2–3	ES Arrou Châtillon Courtalain (11)
12.	UP Illiers-Combray (10)	1–1 (5–4 p)	AG Savigny (11)
13.	AS La Percheronne (9)	3–1	Étoile de Brou (10)
14.	US Voves Foot (11)	1–6	FC Artenay Chevilly (10)
15.	FC Les Bords De l'Eure (11)	0–4	Avenir Ymonville (9)
16.	Luisant AC (9)	1–2	Amicale Sours (9)
17.	CO Chilleurs-aux-Bois (12)	0–3	FC Nogent-le-Phaye (10)
18.	CS Aunay-sous-Auneau (12)	1–6	FC Lucé Ouest (10)
19.	Saint-Étienne-de-Chigny FC (12)	1–2	AS Tours Sud (10)
20.	CD Espagnol Orléans (11)	1–3	US Saint-Martin-le-Beau (10)
21.	AS Esvres (11)	0–2	OC Tours (10)
22.	AS Aubrière (11)	0–13	FC Gâtine Choisilles (9)
23.	US Pernay (10)	1–3	AS Chanceaux (9)
24.	FC Véretz-Azay-Larçay (10)	1–4	US Saint-Pierre-des-Corps (9)
25.	Racing La Riche-Tours (9)	7–1	AS Fondettes (10)
26.	Saint-Avertin Sports (11)	0–3	FC Pays Langeaisien (9)
27.	Football Choisille La Membrolle-Mettray (10)	1–3	ES Bourgueil (9)
28.	FC Étoile Vert (9)	8–2	ASPO Tours (10)
29.	FC Sainte-Maure-Maillé (11)	1–1 (5–6 p)	US Lignières-de-Touraine (10)
30.	AS Luynes (10)	2–0	CS Tourangeau Veigné (10)
31.	FA Saint-Symphorien Tours (10)	3–0	Football Saint-Benoit Huismes (10)
32.	FC Pays Montrésorois (11)	1–5	US Chitenay-Cellettes (9)
33.	Avenir Saint-Amand-Longpré (9)	4–0	ES Chargé (10)
34.	US Saint-Georges-sur-Cher (9)	4–1	Val de Brenne FC (10)
35.	FC Val de Cissé (11)	1–2	AS Saint-Gervais (11)
36.	ASJ La Chaussée-Saint-Victor (10)	4–2	FC Val de Cher 37 (10)
37.	ÉS Villebarou (10)	3–0 (Note: Tie reversed from original draw.) (Note: Tie won by means of forfeit.)	US Renaudine (10)
38.	AS Villedômer (11)	1–1 (4–5 p)	JS Cormeray (11)
39.	AJS Mont/Bracieux (10)	3–0	ES Cheverny Cour-Cheverny (11)
40.	US Fougères Ouchamps Feings (10)	0–0 (2–3 p)	US Saint-Aignan Noyers (10)
41.	US Chémery/Méhers/Saint-Romain (11)	1–2	ASL Orchaise (9)
42.	Jargeau-Saint-Denis FC (10)	0–2	FC Semoy (10)
43.	Entente Chaingy-Saint-Ay Football (10)	0–3	CD Espagnol Orléans (9)
44.	Union Portugaise SS Orléans (10)	2–2 (4–2 p)	ES Marigny (9)
45.	FC Magdunois (10)	3–2	US Beaugency Val-de-Loire (9)
46.	US Sandillon (10)	3–2	CSM Sully-sur-Loire (9)
47.	US Saint-Cyr-en-Val (9)	2–0	AS Baccon Huisseau (10)
48.	ASPTT Orléans (11)	1–3	COS Marcilly-en-Villette (11)
49.	US Beaune-la-Rolande/Corbeilles (11)	3–3 (5–4 p)	US Châlette (10)
50.	ES Gâtinaise (10)	0–4	US Turcs Châlette (9)
51.	US Briare (11)	2–7	US Cepoy-Corquilleroy (10)
52.	EÉ Pithiverienne Dadonville (11)	0–14	Entente Nancray Chambon Nibelle (9)
53.	SL Paucourt (12)	1–3	FC Saint-Maurice-sur-Aveyron (12)
54.	US Villedieu-sur-Indre (9)	5–2	FC Sacierges-Saint-Martin/Saint-Civran/Roussines/Prissac (10)
55.	Espérance Le Pont-Chrétien-Chabenet (11)	0–4	FC Martizay Mézières Tournon (10)
56.	US Champigny-sur-Veude (10)	2–8	Loches AC (9)
57.	Reignac Chambourg Val d'Indre (11)	1–1 (3–2 p)	ES Val de Veude (10)
58.	FC La Celle/Pouzay (11)	1–2	SS Écueilloise (10)
59.	FC Berry Touraine (12)	0–4	AS Saint-Gaultier-Thenay (10)
60.	US Brenne-Vendoeuvres (10)	3–3 (7–8 p)	AS Niherne (10)
61.	AS Ingrandes (11)	1–3	FC Marche Occitane (9)
62.	AC Parnac Val d'Abloux (10)	2–2 (1–4 p)	AC Villers-les-Ormes (9)
63.	FC Velles-Arthon-La Pérouille 36 (10)	2–1	SS Bélâbre (9)
64.	ASFR Saint-Hilaire-de-Court (11)	2–4	FC Levroux (10)
65.	ES Vineuil Brion (11)	2–4	Diables Rouges Selles-Saint-Denis (10)
66.	AS Chabris (10)	2–1	Graçay Genouilly Sports (10)
67.	FC Portugais Selles-sur-Cher (9)	2–0	SC Massay (9)
68.	FC Céphons Bois d'Hault (10)	0–7	SA Issoudun (10)
69.	Cher-Sologne Football (9)	3–0	US Gâtines (10)
70.	US Pruniers (11)	0–3	Étoile Châteauroux (9)
71.	CS Foëcy (11)	1–4	ES Aubigny (9)
72.	FC Coullons-Cerdon (11)	2–3	ALS Léré (10)
73.	US Poilly-Autry (10)	1–0	Olympique Mehunois (10)
74.	CS Vignoux (10)	4–4 (4–5 p)	Bonny-Beaulieu FC (10)
75.	US Nancay-Neuvy-Vouzeron (10)	0–5	SS La Solognote Souesmes (9)
76.	AS Morogues (11)	2–5	ASL Allouis (10)
77.	US Herry (11)	0–3	FC Vasselay-Saint Éloy-de-Gy (11)
78.	AS Salbris (10)	0–7	SL Chaillot Vierzon (9)
79.	CS Argent-sur-Sauldre (10)	3–1	FC Fussy-Saint-Martin-Vigneux (9)
80.	AC Saint-Août (11)	1–4	ECF Bouzanne Vallée Noire (9)
81.	ECL Saint-Christophe (10)	2–1	ES Étrechet (11)
82.	AAE Nohant-Vic (10)	0–3	US Saint-Maur (9)
83.	US La Châtre (9)	3–1	US Aigurande (9)
84.	AS Ardentes (9)	0–2	EGC Touvent Châteauroux (9)
85.	FC Saint-Denis-de-Jouhet/Sarzay (12)	0–5	SS Cluis (11)
86.	US Lunery/Rosières (11)	3–0	US Plaimpied-Givaudins (11)
87.	FC Nerondes (11)	0–1	US Sainte-Solange (9)
88.	FC Avord (11)	0–4	AS Saint-Germain-du-Puy (9)
89.	ES Sancoins (10)	6–2	Olympique Loire Val d'Aubois (10)
90.	Avenir Septaine (11)	4–2	AS Bigny-Vallenay (11)
91.	ÉS Colombiers (11)	3–0	AS Chalivoy-Milon (11)
92.	FC Le Subdray (12)	1–3	Châteauneuf Levet Lignières Foot (9)
93.	US Saint-Florent-sur-Cher (9)	1–3	AS Chapelloise (9)

=== Second round ===
These matches were played on 31 August and 1 September 2024.

Second Round Results: Centre-Val de Loire
Tie no	Home team (Tier)	Score	Away team (Tier)
1.	AS Tréon (10)	1–0	FC Lèves (9)
2.	ACSF Dreux (8)	2–6	ES Maintenon-Pierres (7)
3.	Amicale Gallardon (10)	2–2 (6–7 p)	ES Nogent-le-Roi (8)
4.	US Brezolles (9)	4–2	Amicale Épernon (7)
5.	AS Châteauneuf-en-Thymerais (9)	0–6	FC Drouais (6)
6.	US Petite Beauce (9)	1–0	Amicale de Lucé (7)
7.	AS Nogent-le-Rotrou (9)	2–4	US Vendôme (8)
8.	ES Beauceronne (9)	2–2 (4–3 p)	US Vallée du Loir (10)
9.	SA Marboué (10)	2–3	AS La Percheronne (9)
10.	ES Arrou Châtillon Courtalain (11)	0–2	UP Illiers-Combray (10)
11.	FC Saint-Georges-sur-Eure (8)	2–2 (5–4 p)	CS Mainvilliers (6)
12.	Avenir Ymonville (9)	1–2	Dammarie Foot Bois-Gueslin (8)
13.	FC Nogent-le-Phaye (10)	4–2	Amicale Sours (9)
14.	FC Artenay Chevilly (10)	0–1	FC Lucé Ouest (10)
15.	US Portugaise Joué-lès-Tours (7)	1–2	US Monnaie (6)
16.	FC Gâtine Choisilles (9)	3–3 (5–3 p)	AS Monts (8)
17.	Racing La Riche-Tours (9)	0–3	Tours FC (6)
18.	ES La Ville-aux-Dames (8)	0–2	Chambray FC (6)
19.	AS Chanceaux (9)	1–2	AC Portugal Tours (7)
20.	FC Étoile Vert (9)	0–10	ÉB Saint-Cyr-sur-Loire (6)
21.	ES Bourgueil (9)	4–3	SC Azay-Cheillé (7)
22.	AS Tours Sud (10)	2–4	US Saint-Martin-le-Beau (10)
23.	OC Tours (10)	2–0	FA Saint-Symphorien Tours (10)
24.	FC Pays Langeaisien (9)	2–0	US Lignières-de-Touraine (10)
25.	US Saint-Pierre-des-Corps (9)	2–0	AS Luynes (10)
26.	US Mer (7)	3–0	AFC Blois (8)
27.	Avenir Saint-Amand-Longpré (9)	3–2	AS Chouzy-Onzain (8)
28.	ÉS Villebarou (10)	0–8	AS Contres (8)
29.	AS Saint-Gervais (11)	1–3	CA Saint-Laurent-Nouan La Ferté-Saint-Cyr (9)
30.	US Chitenay-Cellettes (9)	2–0	AC Amboise (8)
31.	ASL Orchaise (9)	2–1	US Saint-Georges-sur-Cher (9)
32.	ASJ La Chaussée-Saint-Victor (10)	5–1	AJS Mont/Bracieux (10)
33.	JS Cormeray (11)	2–6	US Saint-Aignan Noyers (10)
34.	CJF Fleury-les-Aubrais (7)	1–6	FC Saint-Jean-le-Blanc (6)
35.	USM Olivet (8)	1–1 (3–1 p)	US Saint-Cyr-en-Val (9)
36.	US Sandillon (10)	0–1	FCM Ingré (7)
37.	FC Magdunois (10)	0–5	SMOC Saint-Jean-de-Braye (7)
38.	AG Boigny-Chécy-Mardié (8)	0–4	USM Saran (6)
39.	FC Semoy (10)	3–2	Union Portugaise SS Orléans (10)
40.	COS Marcilly-en-Villette (11)	1–5	CD Espagnol Orléans (9)
41.	US Beaune-la-Rolande/Corbeilles (11)	1–2	Neuville Sports (8)
42.	US Turcs Châlette (9)	6–1	US Dampierre-en-Burly (8)
43.	US Cepoy-Corquilleroy (10)	0–3	J3S Amilly (6)
44.	Entente Nancray Chambon Nibelle (9)	3–1	FC Mandorais (8)
45.	FC Saint-Maurice-sur-Aveyron (12)	0–2	USM Montargis (7)
46.	SC Malesherbes (7)	2–1	CA Pithiviers (8)
47.	US Villedieu-sur-Indre (9)	0–1	US Yzeures Preuilly (9)
48.	FC Martizay Mézières Tournon (10)	1–4	US Le Blanc (8)
49.	Loches AC (9)	3–1	Le Richelais (7)
50.	Reignac Chambourg Val d'Indre (11)	1–2	ACS Buzançais (8)
51.	SS Écueilloise (10)	5–8	Saint-Georges Descartes (9)
52.	AS Niherne (10)	0–12	US Argenton Le Pêchereau (8)
53.	AS Saint-Gaultier-Thenay (10)	2–3	FC Marche Occitane (9)
54.	AC Villers-les-Ormes (9)	1–0	FC Velles-Arthon-La Pérouille 36 (10)
55.	FC Levroux (10)	1–3	SC Vatan (8)
56.	Diables Rouges Selles-Saint-Denis (10)	1–3	US Reuilly (8)
57.	AS Chabris (10)	0–2	Cher-Sologne Football (9)
58.	Étoile Châteauroux (9)	0–4	Foot Sud 41 (8)
59.	SA Issoudun (10)	1–4	USA Lury/Méreau (8)
60.	FC Portugais Selles-sur-Cher (9)	2–3	CA Montrichard (7)
61.	ES Aubigny (9)	0–1	Gazélec Bourges (8)
62.	ALS Léré (10)	5–2	FC Vasselay-Saint Éloy-de-Gy (11)
63.	US Poilly-Autry (10)	1–1 (3–4 p)	CS Argent-sur-Sauldre (10)
64.	Bonny-Beaulieu FC (10)	3–3 (3–4 p)	SL Chaillot Vierzon (9)
65.	SS La Solognote Souesmes (9)	2–1	Olympique Portugais Mehun-sur-Yèvre (7)
66.	ASL Allouis (10)	1–1 (6–5 p)	FC Saint-Doulchard (7)
67.	ECF Bouzanne Vallée Noire (9)	2–3	US Le Poinçonnet (8)
68.	US La Châtre (9)	0–5	FC Déolois (6)
69.	SS Cluis (11)	0–6	US Montgivray (8)
70.	EGC Touvent Châteauroux (9)	5–1	FC Diors (8)
71.	ECL Saint-Christophe (10)	3–2	US Saint-Maur (9)
72.	ES Sancoins (10)	0–4	FC Saint-Amand Orval (8)
73.	AS Chapelloise (9)	3–3 (4–3 p)	US Charenton-du-Cher (8)
74.	ÉS Colombiers (11)	0–7	ES Trouy (7)
75.	US Sainte-Solange (9)	1–2	AS Portugais Bourges (7)
76.	US Lunery/Rosières (11)	0–2	Châteauneuf Levet Lignières Foot (9)
77.	Avenir Septaine (11)	0–2	AS Saint-Germain-du-Puy (9)

=== Third round ===
These matches were played on 14 and 15 September 2024.

Third Round Results: Centre-Val de Loire
Tie no	Home team (Tier)	Score	Away team (Tier)
1.	AS Tréon (10)	1–6	SO Romorantin (5)
2.	UP Illiers-Combray (10)	1–9	US Vendôme (8)
3.	FC Nogent-le-Phaye (10)	0–2	FC Drouais (6)
4.	USM Montargis (7)	1–6	Vineuil SF (5)
5.	AS Contres (8)	2–1	ASL Orchaise (9)
6.	Neuville Sports (8)	1–2	J3S Amilly (6)
7.	Dammarie Foot Bois-Gueslin (8)	1–2	FC Saint-Jean-le-Blanc (6)
8.	ES Beauceronne (9)	1–1 (4–1 p)	FC Semoy (10)
9.	Foot Sud 41 (8)	2–1	US Petite Beauce (9)
10.	US Brezolles (9)	0–1	US Chitenay-Cellettes (9)
11.	US Saint-Pierre-des-Corps (9)	1–7	Tours FC (6)
12.	AS La Percheronne (9)	1–5	USM Saran (6)
13.	ASJ La Chaussée-Saint-Victor (10)	0–3	ES Maintenon-Pierres (7)
14.	FC Lucé Ouest (10)	0–2	SMOC Saint-Jean-de-Braye (7)
15.	US Turcs Châlette (9)	1–2	FCM Ingré (7)
16.	Entente Nancray Chambon Nibelle (9)	0–4	C'Chartres Football (5)
17.	CA Saint-Laurent-Nouan La Ferté-Saint-Cyr (9)	1–3	US Châteauneuf-sur-Loire (5)
18.	SS La Solognote Souesmes (9)	1–7	SC Malesherbes (7)
19.	CD Espagnol Orléans (9)	2–1	USM Olivet (8)
20.	FC Gâtine Choisilles (9)	4–2	FC Saint-Georges-sur-Eure (8)
21.	ES Nogent-le-Roi (8)	3–0	Avenir Saint-Amand-Longpré (9)
22.	OC Tours (10)	2–2 (5–3 p)	US Le Blanc (8)
23.	ALS Léré (10)	0–3	ES Trouy (7)
24.	US Mer (7)	1–3	ES Moulon Bourges (5)
25.	US Reuilly (8)	4–4 (6–5 p)	AS Chapelloise (9)
26.	ECL Saint-Christophe (10)	0–8	FC Montlouis (5)
27.	US Saint-Martin-le-Beau (10)	1–0	US Saint-Aignan Noyers (10)
28.	Cher-Sologne Football (9)	0–2	FC Déolois (6)
29.	FC Marche Occitane (9)	1–4	Vierzon FC (5)
30.	FC Saint-Amand Orval (8)	2–6	FC Ouest Tourangeau (5)
31.	SL Chaillot Vierzon (9)	0–1	US Argenton Le Pêchereau (8)
32.	Châteauneuf Levet Lignières Foot (9)	1–1 (3–5 p)	ES Bourgueil (9)
33.	AC Villers-les-Ormes (9)	0–3	US Monnaie (6)
34.	US Montgivray (8)	2–2 (4–2 p)	AS Saint-Germain-du-Puy (9)
35.	AS Portugais Bourges (7)	3–1	Gazélec Bourges (8)
36.	SC Vatan (8)	1–3	ÉB Saint-Cyr-sur-Loire (6)
37.	USA Lury/Méreau (8)	1–2	Avoine OCC (5)
38.	Loches AC (9)	1–0	AC Portugal Tours (7)
39.	Saint-Georges Descartes (9)	4–1	ACS Buzançais (8)
40.	FC Pays Langeaisien (9)	1–1 (5–4 p)	CA Montrichard (7)
41.	US Le Poinçonnet (8)	1–1 (3–4 p)	Chambray FC (6)
42.	CS Argent-sur-Sauldre (10)	1–4	EGC Touvent Châteauroux (9)
43.	US Yzeures Preuilly (9)	6–0	ASL Allouis (10)

=== Fourth round ===
These matches were played on 28 and 29 September 2024.

Fourth Round Results: Centre-Val de Loire
Tie no	Home team (Tier)	Score	Away team (Tier)
1.	ES Maintenon-Pierres (7)	0–7	Blois Football 41 (4)
2.	US Vendôme (8)	0–4	Tours FC (6)
3.	SC Malesherbes (7)	0–3	C'Chartres Football (5)
4.	J3S Amilly (6)	4–1	SMOC Saint-Jean-de-Braye (7)
5.	CD Espagnol Orléans (9)	0–6	SO Romorantin (5)
6.	USM Saran (6)	1–3	Saint-Pryvé Saint-Hilaire FC (4)
7.	Foot Sud 41 (8)	0–5	FC Drouais (6)
8.	ES Nogent-le-Roi (8)	1–1 (2–1 p)	Vineuil SF (5)
9.	AS Contres (8)	4–1	FC Gâtine Choisilles (9)
10.	US Chitenay-Cellettes (9)	0–1	US Châteauneuf-sur-Loire (5)
11.	OC Tours (10)	4–0	ES Beauceronne (9)
12.	US Reuilly (8)	0–2	Loches AC (9)
13.	EGC Touvent Châteauroux (9)	4–0	US Saint-Martin-le-Beau (10)
14.	US Argenton Le Pêchereau (8)	4–2	Saint-Georges Descartes (9)
15.	ES Trouy (7)	1–4	AS Portugais Bourges (7)
16.	Avoine OCC (5)	1–1 (6–7 p)	FC Montlouis (5)
17.	FC Pays Langeaisien (9)	0–7	ES Moulon Bourges (5)
18.	FC Déolois (6)	0–4	FC Ouest Tourangeau (5)
19.	ÉB Saint-Cyr-sur-Loire (6)	5–2	FCM Ingré (7)
20.	US Yzeures Preuilly (9)	0–2	Chambray FC (6)
21.	Bourges Foot 18 (4)	0–2	Vierzon FC (5)
22.	ES Bourgueil (9)	5–1	US Montgivray (8)
23.	FC Saint-Jean-le-Blanc (6)	1–2	US Monnaie (6)

=== Fifth round ===
These matches were played on 12 and 13 October 2024.

Fifth Round Results: Centre-Val de Loire
Tie no	Home team (Tier)	Score	Away team (Tier)
1.	EGC Touvent Châteauroux (9)	0–4	Tours FC (6)
2.	OC Tours (10)	0–3	ES Bourgueil (9)
3.	US Châteauneuf-sur-Loire (5)	2–4	Blois Football 41 (4)
4.	US Monnaie (6)	2–1	Chambray FC (6)
5.	Loches AC (9)	0–4	Saint-Pryvé Saint-Hilaire FC (4)
6.	FC Ouest Tourangeau (5)	1–2	Vierzon FC (5)
7.	AS Portugais Bourges (7)	4–1	J3S Amilly (6)
8.	US Argenton Le Pêchereau (8)	0–4	US Orléans (3)
9.	FC Montlouis (5)	3–0	FC Drouais (6)
10.	AS Contres (8)	0–3	ES Moulon Bourges (5)
11.	ES Nogent-le-Roi (8)	0–6	SO Romorantin (5)
12.	C'Chartres Football (5)	1–0	ÉB Saint-Cyr-sur-Loire (6)

=== Sixth round ===
These matches were played on 26 and 27 October 2024.

Sixth Round Results: Centre-Val de Loire
Tie no	Home team (Tier)	Score	Away team (Tier)
1.	Saint-Pryvé Saint-Hilaire FC (4)	0–0 (5–6 p)	SO Romorantin (5)
2.	Blois Football 41 (4)	1–1 (2–4 p)	Vierzon FC (5)
3.	Tours FC (6)	2–1	FC Montlouis (5)
4.	ES Bourgueil (9)	0–4	US Orléans (3)
5.	ES Moulon Bourges (5)	1–1 (4–5 p)	C'Chartres Football (5)
6.	AS Portugais Bourges (7)	1–2	US Monnaie (6)
