= FR Velles =

French football club

Velles
- Full name: FR Velles
- Dissolved: 2019
- Ground: Stade Maurice Raes

FR Velles was a French association football club based in the commune of Velles, Indre. In the 1997–98 season, the club reached the Seventh Round of the Coupe de France, but were defeated 9–0 by Chamois Niortais. Their home stadium was Stade Maurice Raes, next to Bureau de Poste de Velles in Département de l'Indre. The club was dissolved in 2019 as part of a merger of three local clubs from Velles, Arthon and La Pérouille to form FC Valp 36.
