= Joué-lès-Tours FCT =

French football club

- Full name: Joué-lès-Tours Football Club Touraine
- Founded: 2008
- Dissolved: 2024
- Ground: Stade Jean Bouin, Joué-lès-Tours
- Chairman: James Saborault
- League: Division d'Honneur de Centre

Joué-lès-Tours Football Club Touraine was a French association football club founded in 2008 as the result of a merger between US Joué-lès-Tours and ASC Joué Touraine. It is based in the town of Joué-lès-Tours, Indre-et-Loire and its home stadium is the Stade Jean Bouin. As of the 2009–10 season, the club plays in the Division d'Honneur de Centre, the sixth tier of French football.

In August 2024, the club announced that they would be folding due to economic difficulties.
