= Vineuil SF =

French football club

- Full name: Vineuil Sports Football
- Founded: 1965
- Ground: Stade Municipal, Vineuil
- Capacity: 1,100
- Chairman: Éric Arrivault
- Manager: Fabien Lavechin
- League: National 3 Group C
- 2022–23: Régional 1, Center-Val de Loire, 3rd (promoted)
Home colours

Vineuil Sports Football is a French association football club founded in 1965. They are based in the town of Vineuil, Loir-et-Cher and their home stadium is the Stade Municipal which has a capacity of approximately 1,100 spectators. As of the 2023–24 season, the club plays in the Championnat National 3, the fifth tier of French football, having been promoted to this level for the first time in their history in 2023.
