= J3S Amilly =

- Full name: J3 Sports Amilly Football
- Founded: 1949
- Ground: Stade Georges Clericeau, Amilly
- Chairman: Olivier Roulland
- Manager: Guillaume Coquelin
- League: Régional 1 Centre-Val de Loire
- 2021–22: National 3 Group C, 14th (relegated)

J3 Sports Amilly Football is a French association football club created in 1949 by René Fouassier. The club wears the colours green and white, and are based in the town of Amilly, Loiret, with their home stadium in the Stade Georges Clericeau. As of the 2022–2023 season, the club plays in the sixth tier of French football, after two seasons at the fifth tier.

The best result in French Cup is the 7th round.
