= C'Chartres Football =

French football club

- Full name: C'Chartres Football
- Founded: 2018
- Ground: Stade Jacques-Couvret, Chartres
- Capacity: 2,500
- Chairman: Gérard Soler
- Manager: Pierre-Yves David
- League: Régional 1 Center-Val de Loire
- 2022–23: National 2 Group A, 16th (relegated)
- Website: https://c-chartresfootball.com
Home colours	Away colours

C'Chartres Football, or simply C'Chartres, is a football club based in Chartres, France. The club was founded in 2018 by the merger of FC Chartres and Chartres Horizon. The club were demoted by the DNCG to Régional 1 at the end of the 2022–23 Championnat National 2 season, for financial reasons.
