= CSM Sully-sur-Loire =

French football club

Sully-sur-Loire
- Full name: Club Sportif Municipal Sully-sur-Loire
- Ground: Stade Lionel Jourdain, Sully-sur-Loire
- Chairman: José Hernandez Rodriguez
- League: Division d'Honneur Regionale de Centre

Club Sportif Municipal Sully-sur-Loire is a French association football club. They are based in the town of Sully-sur-Loire and their home stadium is the Stade Lionel Jourdain. As of the 2009–10 season, the club plays in the Division d'Honneur Regionale de Centre, the seventh tier of French football.
