= Amicale de Lucé =

French football club

- Founded: 1938; 88 years ago
- Ground: Stade Jean Boudrie
- Capacity: 2,000
Home colours

Amicale de Lucé is a French football club based in Lucé.

The club played in the second division from 1976 to 1980. They reached the last 16 of the Coupe de France in 1978.

== Honours ==
- Champion of Division 3 Groupe Centre : 1976
- Champion of Centre de Division d'Honneur : 1979
