= FC Drouais =

French football club

- Full name: Football Club Drouais
- Founded: 1991
- Ground: Stade Jean-Bruck, Dreux (former Stade du Vieux-Pré)
- Capacity: 2,650
- Chairman: Aziz Talata
- Manager: Gwenaël Maurice
- League: Régional 1 Centre-Val de Loire
- 2022–23: National 3 Group C, 13th (relegated)
Home colours

Football Club Drouais is a French association football team based in Dreux, France. Founded in 1991, the team plays its home games at Stade Jean-Bruck in Dreux. As of the 2023–24 season, they compete in Régional 1, the sixth tier of French football, following relegation from Championnat National 3. In 2018, they were administratively relegated from Championnat National 3 for breaching financial regulations.

== Coupe de France ==
FC Drouais reached the round of 64 in 2012–13 Coupe de France, their best ever performance in the competition

== Notable players ==
- (Senegal) Kalifa Cissé
- (France) Enzo Millot (youth)
- (France) Patrick Vieira (youth)
