= SC Malesherbes =

Football club in Le Malesherbois, France

Malesherbes
- Full name: Sporting Club Malesherbois Football
- Founded: 1957
- League: Régional 2 Centre-Val de Loire; Group B

Sporting Club Malesherbes Football, known as SC Malesherbois, SC Malesherbes, or simply Malesherbes, is a football club based in Le Malesherbois, France. As of the 2023–24 season, it competes in the Régional 2, the seventh tier of the French football league system.

== History ==
On 13 June 2023, Malesherbes became the first recipient of a FIFA Clearing House payment thanks to the transfer of Benoît Badiashile to Chelsea.

== Notable players ==
- (France) Benoît Badiashile (youth)
- (France) Yvan Ikia Dimi (youth)
- (France) Jean-Victor Makengo (youth)
