= FC Saint-Jean-le-Blanc =

Saint-Jean-le-Blanc
- Full name: Football Club Saint-Jean-le-Blanc
- Founded: 1969
- Stadium: Stade Lionel Charbonnier, Saint-Jean-le-Blanc
- President: David Lopes
- Manager: Emmanuel Jemili
- League: Régional 1 Center-Val de Loire
- 2022–23: National 3 Group C, 11th (relegated)
Home colours

FC Saint-Jean-le-Blanc is a French football club founded in 1969. It is based in the commune Saint-Jean-le-Blanc, Loiret, and plays its home games at Stade Lionel Charbonnier.

For the 2023–24 season, the team plays in Régional 1, after suffering relegation at the end of the 2022–23 Championnat National 3 season.

The reserve team plays in Régional 2, and the club also has a third team in D2. The senior woman's team is playing in Régional 2 for the second consecutive year.
