= USM Montargis =

French sports club

- Full name: Union Sportive Municipale Montargis
- Founded: 1919
- Ground: Stade Maurice Beraud, Montargis
- Chairman: Alain Desoeuvres
- League: Régional 1 Centre-Val de Loire
- 2022–23: National 3 Group C, 14th (relegated)

Union Sportive Municipale Montargis is a French sports club. They are based in the town of Montargis and their home stadium is the Stade Maurice Beraud. As of the 2023–24 season, the club's association football team plays in the Régional 1, the sixth tier of French football.

== Current squad ==
Note: Flags indicate national team as defined under FIFA eligibility rules; some limited exceptions apply. Players may hold more than one non-FIFA nationality.

No.	Pos.	Nation	Player
—	DF	(Central African Republic) CTA	Karl Kaimba
