= Vierzon FC =

French football club

Vierzon
- Full name: Vierzon FC
- Founded: 2001
- Ground: Stade de Brouhot, Vierzon
- Chairman: Thierry Pronko
- Manager: Davy Merabti
- League: National 3 Group C
- 2021–22: National 2 Group D, 16th (relegated)
- Website: https://vfc-vierzon.footeo.com
Home colours

Vierzon FC is a French association football club founded in 2001 as Vierzon Foot 18, the result of a merger between FC Vierzon and Stade Vierzonnais. In 2015 they merged with Églantine Vierzon and assumed their current name. They are based in the town of Vierzon and their home stadium is the Stade de Labras. As of the 2023–24 season, the club plays in Championnat National 3, the fifth tier of French football.

== Current squad ==
As of 19 March 2019

Note: Flags indicate national team as defined under FIFA eligibility rules; some limited exceptions apply. Players may hold more than one non-FIFA nationality.

No.	Pos.	Nation	Player
—	GK	FRA	Romane Legrand
—	GK	FRA	Ludovic Rose-Antoinette
—	DF	FRA	Anli Ahamada
—	DF	FRA	Mathieu Béguin
—	DF	FRA	Dave Cristiano
—	DF	SEN	Souleymane Diagne
—	DF	FRA	Jordan Petit
—	DF	FRA	Thibaud Plisson
—	DF	FRA	Adrien Ribac
—	DF	FRA	Franck Samet
—	DF	FRA	Wilfried Tchamako
—	DF	FRA	Billel Toumi
—	DF	FRA	Robin Bardi

No.	Pos.	Nation	Player
—	MF	FRA	Mohamed Benmami
—	MF	FRA	Mathieu Dinet
—	MF	FRA	Joan Dossavi
—	MF	FRA	Adel Khechim
—	MF	FRA	Jordan Missonsa
—	MF	FRA	Christopher Petit
—	MF	FRA	Evrard Yagbazia
—	FW	FRA	Mohamed Bouzid
—	FW	FRA	Bakeba Dibane
—	FW	FRA	Radoine Farhan
—	FW	FRA	Andy Felsina
—	FW	FRA	Babacar Gaye
—	FW	FRA	Younes Boughazi
—	FW	FRA	Alexis Gauthier
