= USM Saran =

French football club

Saran
- Full name: Union Sportive Municipale de Saran Football
- Founded: 1974
- Ground: Stade Jacques Mazzuca (ex Bois Joly), Saran, Loiret
- Chairman: Dominique Amico
- Manager: Laurent Chéry
- League: National 3 Group H
- 2022–23: National 3 Group C, 8th
- Website: https://www.saranfoot.fr
Home colours

Union Sportive Municipale Saran Football is a French association football club founded in 1974. They are based in the town of Saran, Loiret and their home stadium is the Stade Jacques Mazzuca (ex Bois Joly). As of the 2022–23 season, the club plays in the National 3, the fifth tier of French football.
