= Avoine OCC =

French football club

- Full name: Avoine Olympique Chinon Cinais
- Founded: 1963
- Ground: Stade Marcel Vignaud, Avoine
- Chairman: Ludovic Le Tout
- Manager: Armand Raimbault
- League: National 1 Group B
- 2022–23: National 3 Group C, 1st (promoted)
- Website: https://www.aocc.fr
| Home colours | Away colours |

Avoine Olympique Chinon Cinais (until 2010 Union Sportive Électrique Avoine) is a French association football club founded in 1963. They are based in the town of Avoine, Indre-et-Loire and their home stadium is the Stade Marcel Vignaud. Since the 2023–24 season, the club plays in the Championnat National 1, the fourth tier of French football. In 2013 they adopted their current name after a merger with FC Chinon.

== Current squad ==
As of 8 May 2020

Note: Flags indicate national team as defined under FIFA eligibility rules; some limited exceptions apply. Players may hold more than one non-FIFA nationality.

| No. | Pos. | Nation | Player |
|---|---|---|---|
| — | GK | FRA | Jawad Khacime |
| — | GK | FRA | Romain Quenard |
| — | GK | FRA | Tristan Beausse |
| — | DF | FRA | Anli Ahamada |
| — | DF | FRA | Yannis Boutouil |
| — | DF | FRA | Nassim Chergui |
| — | DF | FRA | Christian Kipré |
| — | DF | FRA | Benjamin Guérin |
| — | DF | FRA | Denis Mayélé |
| — | DF | FRA | Morgan Vuillemot |
| — | MF | FRA | Ansar Ahamada |

| No. | Pos. | Nation | Player |
|---|---|---|---|
| — | MF | FRA | Florent Gache |
| — | MF | FRA | Nabil Khali |
| — | MF | FRA | Amine Hemia |
| — | MF | GAB | Jack Rissonga Lemboma |
| — | MF | ALB | Renald Xhemo |
| — | FW | FRA | Abiola Badirou |
| — | FW | FRA | Teddy Audinet |
| — | FW | FRA | Babeka Dibane |
| — | FW | CIV | Michel Gaye |
| — | FW | FRA | Mehdi Courgnaud |
| — | FW | FRA | Thomas Koudité |

Former logo of USE Avoine.
