= 2019–20 Coupe de France preliminary rounds, Centre-Val de Loire =

The 2019–20 Coupe de France preliminary rounds, Centre-Val de Loire was the qualifying competition to decide which teams from the leagues of the Centre-Val de Loire region of France took part in the main competition from the seventh round.

A total of five teams qualified from the Centre-Val de Loire preliminary rounds. In 2018–19, Saint-Pryvé Saint-Hilaire FC progressed furthest in the main competition, reaching the round of 32 before losing to Stade Rennais.

== Schedule ==
The first two rounds of qualifying took place on the weekends of 25 August and 1 September 2019. 225 teams entered in these rounds, from tier 6 (Regional division 1) and below. 11 teams were exempted to the second round, meaning 107 ties in the first round and 59 ties in the second round.

The third round draw was made on 5 September 2019, with the 11 Championnat National 3 clubs entering, resulting in 35 ties.

The fourth round draw was made on 19 September 2019, with the 5 Championnat National 2 clubs entering, resulting in 20 ties.

The fifth round draw was made on 3 October 2019. The sixth round draw was made on 15 October 2019.

=== First round ===
These matches were played on 24 and 25 August 2019.

First round results: Centre-Val de Loire
Tie no	Home team (tier)	Score	Away team (tier)
1.	AS Villemeux-sur-Eure (11)	0–3 (Note: Tie won by means of forfeit.)	SMOC St Jean-de-Braye (8)
2.	FC Perche Senonchois (10)	1–9 (Note: ASJ La Chaussée-St-Victor penalised for fielding a suspended player. FC Perche Senonchois qualify.)	ASJ La Chaussée-St-Victor (8)
3.	Amicale Courvilloise (9)	2–3	FCM Ingré (8)
4.	CA Ouzouer-le-Marché (9)	2–1	CS Angerville-Pussay (10)
5.	Amicale Sours (9)	4–1	USS Portugais Orléans (10)
6.	Ormes-St Péravy FC (11)	1–5 (Note: Amicale Épernon penalised for fielding a suspended player. Ormes-St Péravy FC qualify.)	Amicale Épernon (8)
7.	FJ Champhol (9)	2–1	CS Oucques (10)
8.	Avenir Ymonville (8)	4–3 (a.e.t.)	CJF Fleury-les-Aubrais (8)
9.	US Alluyes (11)	1–2	US Vendôme (8)
10.	Béville SF (11)	2–1	CA Pithiviers (7)
11.	ES Azé Thoré Lunay (10)	0–2	ES Maintenon-Pierres (8)
12.	Neuville Sports (9)	2–1	Dammarie Foot Bois-Gueslin (8)
13.	CD Espagnol Orléans (10)	0–1	Luisant AC (7)
14.	AS Suèvres (10)	0–5	UP Illiers-Combray (9)
15.	CS Mainvilliers (8)	2–4	AG Boigny-Chécy-Mardié (9)
16.	FCO Saint-Jean-de-la-Ruelle (9)	3–1	CEP La Ferté-Vidame (9)
17.	MS Authon-du-Perche (11)	1–1 (11–12 p)	Avenir St Amand-Longpré (8)
18.	AJS Mont-Bracieux (9)	4–1	OC Châteaudun (8)
19.	SC Malesherbes (8)	4–2	ES Nogent-le-Roi (7)
20.	ES Nancray-Chambon-Nibelle (9)	3–2	US Vallée du Loir (10)
21.	AS Châteauneuf-en-Thymerais (10)	0–3	ACSF Dreux (9)
22.	US Pontoise (11)	4–1	FC Bû (11)
23.	FC Tremblay-les-Villages (9)	0–3	FC St Georges-sur-Eure (6)
24.	CAN Portugais Chartres (10)	4–0	FC Beauvoir (11)
25.	Stade Loupéen (11)	0–10	Amicale de Lucé (8)
26.	FC Lèves (10)	4–1	AS Tout Horizon Dreux (8)
27.	US St Cyr-en-Val (11)	1–8	St Roch City Romorantin (10)
28.	SL Chaillot Vierzon (10)	0–1	USM Olivet (7)
29.	FC Vallée de l'Ouanne (9)	2–1 (a.e.t.)	Diables Rouges Selles-St Denis (9)
30.	COS Marcilly-en-Villette (10)	1–2	SC Massay (7)
31.	FC Coullons-Cerdon (10)	5–2	Olympique Loire Val d'Aubois (11)
32.	CS Vignoux-sur-Barangeon (8)	0–3	US Dampierre-en-Burly (8)
33.	Bonny-Beaulieu FC (10)	4–3 (a.e.t.)	AS Nouan-Lamotte (9)
34.	US Nançay-Neuvy-Vouzeron (11)	1–2	RC Bouzy-Les Bordes (11)
35.	AS Salbris (10)	0–9	J3S Amilly (6)
36.	CS Foëcy (11)	0–5	US Briare (11)
37.	US Lorris (11)	3–2	ES Aubigny (9)
38.	Olympique Mehunois (10)	0–9	FC Saint-Jean-le-Blanc (6)
39.	ES Marigny 45 (10)	2–2 (4–2 p)	ES Gâtinaise (8)
40.	US Poilly-Autry (10)	0–6 (Note: CSM Sully-sur-Loire penalised for fielding a suspended player. US Poilly-Autry qualify.)	CSM Sully-sur-Loire (7)
41.	Liniez AC (11)	2–3	FC Avord (10)
42.	SS Cluis (11)	0–5	AS St Germain-du-Puy (8)
43.	AS Ingrandes (11)	3–2 (a.e.t.)	Olympique Morthomiers (10)
44.	Olympique Portugais Mehun-sur-Yèvre (9)	4–0	FC de la Marche Occitane (10)
45.	US Dun-sur-Auron (11)	1–3	ECF Bouzanne Vallée Noire (9)
46.	FC Luant (10)	1–8	ES Moulon Bourges (7)
47.	US Sainte-Solange (13)	1–2	AS Chabris (10)
48.	ES Sancoins (10)	0–3	FC Diors (7)
49.	USC Châtres-Langon-Mennetou (10)	3–5	US St Maur (9)
50.	USA Lury-Méreau (10)	3–0	US Reuilly (10)
51.	FC Levroux (9)	3–1	AS Orval (9)
52.	AS Chapelloise (9)	1–1 (2–4 p)	ES Poulaines (9)
53.	US Aigurande (9)	4–2 (a.e.t.)	ES Trouy (9)
54.	FC Velles-Arthon-La Pérouille 36 (10)	1–0	Gazélec Bourges (8)
55.	US La Châtre (8)	2–2 (3–4 p)	FC Fussy-St Martin-Vigneux (8)
56.	ES Villefranche-sur-Cher (10)	1–5	SA Issoudun (9)
57.	US Bouges (10)	0–3	AS Portugais Bourges (6)
58.	Avenir de la Septaine (10)	4–2	La Patriote Ambrault (10)
59.	US Argenton-sur-Creuse (9)	6–0	US Charenton-du-Cher (10)
60.	Avenir Lignières (9)	2–3 (a.e.t.)	AC Parnac Val d'Abloux (9)
61.	EGC Touvent Châteauroux (9)	3–1	US St Florent-sur-Cher (10)
62.	SC Châteauneuf-sur-Cher (10)	3–0	US Montierchaume (10)
63.	US Le Pêchereau (11)	0–2	FC Verdigny Sancerre (9)
64.	US Châteaumeillant-Le Châtelet-Culan (10)	2–8	SC Vatan (8)
65.	ES Étrechet (11)	0–4	FC St Doulchard (7)
66.	AS Bigny-Vallenay (11)	0–0 (3–1 p)	JAS Moulins-sur-Céphons (11)
67.	AC Villers-les-Ormes (10)	0–2	ASIE du Cher (10)
68.	AS Soulangis (11)	3–2	ES St Plantaire-Cuzion-Orsennes (11)
69.	US Le Poinçonnet (8)	0–2	US Montgivray (8)
70.	ES Vineuil-Brion (9)	1–9	FC Déolois (6)
71.	Espoire Pont-Chrétien-Chabenet (10)	0–3	AS St Gaultier-Thenay (10)
72.	US Villedieu-sur-Indre (10)	2–8	US Renaudine (8)
73.	Entente Palluau-St Genou (11)	0–6	ES La Ville-aux-Dames (8)
74.	Entente Arpheuilles-Clion-Saulnay (10)	1–2	FC Berry Touraine (11)
75.	AS Niherne (11)	0–6	US Chambray-lès-Tours (6)
76.	US Argy (11)	0–8	Loches AC (10)
77.	AS Pays de Racan (10)	5–0	US Gâtines (10)
78.	AS Anché (11)	3–5 (a.e.t.)	Cher-Sologne Football (8)
79.	AS Villedômer (10)	0–3	AFC Blois (8)
80.	FC Lamembrolle-Mettray (11)	2–0	Vineuil SF (6)
81.	AS St Gervais (10)	1–2	Avionnette Parçay-Meslay FC (11)
82.	Langeais Cinq-Mars Foot (8)	1–1 (3–4 p)	ACS Buzançais (9)
83.	St Georges Descartes (8)	8–0	AS Chailles-Candé 99 (11)
84.	US Brenne Vendœuvres (10)	2–5	Le Richelais (8)
85.	US Saint-Pierre-des-Corps (9)	5–4 (a.e.t.)	US Le Blanc (8)
86.	AS Chouzy-Onzain (8)	2–1	US Portugaise Joué-lès-Tours (7)
87.	AS Nazelles-Négron (11)	2–5	AS Tours Sud (11)
88.	AS Fondettes (9)	3–5 (a.e.t.)	Joué-lès-Tours FCT (7)
89.	AS Esvres (10)	1–4	US Monnaie (9)
90.	US Véronaise (10)	1–1 (5–3 p)	FC Etoile Verte (9)
91.	FA St Symphorien Tours (11)	1–1 (1–4 p)	FC Beaumont-en-Véron (10)
92.	ES Vallée Verte (10)	5–3	AS Monts (8)
93.	CCSP Tours (8)	4–1	US Yzeures-Preuilly (9)
94.	ES Oésienne (9)	0–4	Racing La Riche-Tours (8)
95.	AS Villiers-au-Bouin (9)	0–2	ES Bourgueil (9)
96.	FC Bléré Val de Cher (9)	5–2	FC Ste Maure-Maillé (10)
97.	US Montbazon (11)	2–3	SC Azay-Cheillé (7)
98.	CA St Laurent-Nouan (10)	0–3	ES Chaingy-St Ay (8)
99.	US Pouillé-Mareuil (11)	2–3	ESCALE Orléans (8)
100.	US St Aignan/Noyers (10)	4–1	St Denis-en-Val FC (11)
101.	CA Montrichard (8)	1–1 (4–5 p)	AS Contres (7)
102.	AC Amboise (10)	5–4	Jargeau-St Denis FC (11)
103.	ES Chargé (11)	2–4	US Mer (8)
104.	US Chémery/Méhers/Saint-Romain (11)	0–3	AS Baccon-Huisseau (9)
105.	JS Cormeray (10)	1–2	US Beaugency Val-de-Loire (8)
106.	ASL Orchaise (9)	2–1	CS Lusitanos Beaugency (9)
107.	US Chitenay-Cellettes (8)	3–2 (a.e.t.)	ES Villebarou (9)

=== Second round ===
These matches were played on 1 September 2019.

Second round results: Centre-Val de Loire
Tie no	Home team (tier)	Score	Away team (tier)
1.	Amicale de Lucé (8)	2–1	FC St Georges-sur-Eure (6)
2.	ES Maintenon-Pierres (8)	2–1	FCM Ingré (8)
3.	Avenir St Amand-Longpré (8)	2–0	AJS Mont-Bracieux (9)
4.	US Pontoise (11)	3–3 (3–4 p) (Note: Tie reversed with the agreement of both clubs.)	AS Tréon (12)
5.	SC Malesherbes (8)	7–2	CA Ouzouer-le-Marché (9)
6.	Ormes-St Péravy FC (11)	2–0	FCO Saint-Jean-de-la-Ruelle (9)
7.	EE Pithiviers-le-Veil-Dadonville (11)	5–0	FC Perche Senonchois (10)
8.	FC Lèves (10)	2–4	Neuville Sports (9)
9.	ACSF Dreux (9)	3–1	US Vendôme (8)
10.	ES Nancray-Chambon-Nibelle (9)	1–5	Luisant AC (7)
11.	Béville SF (11)	3–5	FJ Champhol (9)
12.	CAN Portugais Chartres (10)	0–5	SMOC St Jean-de-Braye (8)
13.	UP Illiers-Combray (9)	2–1	Avenir Ymonville (8)
14.	AG Boigny-Chécy-Mardié (9)	2–0	Amicale Sours (9)
15.	US Briare (11)	2–6	Bonny-Beaulieu FC (10)
16.	St Roch City Romorantin (10)	2–2 (2–4 p)	FC Coullons-Cerdon (10)
17.	RC Bouzy-Les Bordes (11)	2–1	US Lorris (11)
18.	FC Vallée de l'Ouanne (9)	1–4	USM Olivet (7)
19.	ASL Allouis (13)	0–3 (Note: Tie won by means of forfeit.)	FC Saint-Jean-le-Blanc (6)
20.	AS Isdes-Vannes-Villemurlin-Viglain (13)	0–3	ES Marigny 45 (10)
21.	US Poilly-Autry (10)	0–3	SC Massay (7)
22.	US Dampierre-en-Burly (8)	2–5 (a.e.t.)	J3S Amilly (6)
23.	ECF Bouzanne Vallée Noire (9)	4–3	Avenir de la Septaine (10)
24.	US Aigurande (9)	3–8 (a.e.t.)	US Argenton-sur-Creuse (9)
25.	SC Châteauneuf-sur-Cher (10)	8–0	AS Soulangis (11)
26.	ES Poulaines (9)	2–1	AC Parnac Val d'Abloux (9)
27.	SC Vatan (8)	0–2	FC St Doulchard (7)
28.	AS Bigny-Vallenay (11)	0–3	AS St Germain-du-Puy (8)
29.	AS Portugais Bourges (6)	1–0	FC Diors (7)
30.	FC Verdigny Sancerre (9)	1–2	EGC Touvent Châteauroux (9)
31.	Olympique Portugais Mehun-sur-Yèvre (9)	2–0	USA Lury-Méreau (10)
32.	FC Levroux (9)	0–1	ES Moulon Bourges (7)
33.	SA Issoudun (9)	3–1	AS St Gaultier-Thenay (10)
34.	AS Chalivoy-Milon (12)	1–5	US St Maur (9)
35.	FC Fussy-St Martin-Vigneux (8)	2–3	FC Déolois (6)
36.	ASIE du Cher (10)	4–3 (a.e.t.)	FC Velles-Arthon-La Pérouille 36 (10)
37.	FC Sacierges-St Martin/St Civran/Roussines/Prissac (13)	1–7	US Montgivray (8)
38.	AJS Bourges (13)	2–2 (1–3 p)	US Montgivray (8)
39.	AS Chabris (10)	1–4	AS Ingrandes (11)
40.	Avionnette Parçay-Meslay FC (11)	2–0	Racing La Riche-Tours (8)
41.	US Saint-Pierre-des-Corps (9)	4–1	AS Chouzy-Onzain (8)
42.	US Monnaie (9)	0–0 (4–3 p)	Loches AC (10)
43.	ES Bourgueil (9)	0–5	SC Azay-Cheillé (7)
44.	FC Beaumont-en-Véron (10)	2–3 (a.e.t.)	FC Berry Touraine (11)
45.	ES La Ville-aux-Dames (8)	1–0	ACS Buzançais (9)
46.	AS Pays de Racan (10)	2–5 (a.e.t.)	St Georges Descartes (8)
47.	Le Richelais (8)	2–6	CCSP Tours (8)
48.	AS Tours Sud (11)	0–1	FC Bléré Val de Cher (9)
49.	ES Vallée Verte (10)	2–0	US Renaudine (8)
50.	FC Lamembrolle-Mettray (11)	0–4	Cher-Sologne Football (8)
51.	US Véronaise (10)	0–6	US Chambray-lès-Tours (6)
52.	AC Bréhémont (12)	0–3	Joué-lès-Tours FCT (7)
53.	US Ports-Nouâtre (12)	2–7	AFC Blois (8)
54.	US St Aignan/Noyers (10)	0–7	US Beaugency Val-de-Loire (8)
55.	ES Chaingy-St Ay (8)	5–2	US Mer (8)
56.	AC Amboise (10)	2–2 (2–4 p)	ESCALE Orléans (8)
57.	ASL Orchaise (9)	2–1	AS Contres (7)
58.	AS Portugaise Mer (12)	0–1	US Chitenay-Cellettes (8)
59.	JL Val de Creuse (11)	1–8	AS Baccon-Huisseau (9)

=== Third round ===
These matches were played on 14 and 15 September 2019.

Third round results: Centre-Val de Loire
Tie no	Home team (tier)	Score	Away team (tier)
1.	Bonny-Beaulieu FC (10)	0–3	FC Drouais (5)
2.	ES Marigny 45 (10)	3–1	US Beaugency Val-de-Loire (8)
3.	Ormes-St Péravy FC (11)	0–7	Neuville Sports (9)
4.	FJ Champhol (9)	2–5	AG Boigny-Chécy-Mardié (9)
5.	Avenir St Amand-Longpré (8)	2–2 (1–4 p)	ES Maintenon-Pierres (8)
6.	SC Malesherbes (8)	3–2	SMOC St Jean-de-Braye (8)
7.	AS Tréon (12)	1–7	US Chambray-lès-Tours (6)
8.	Tours FC (5)	7–1 (Note: Tie reversed with agreement of both clubs.)	Joué-lès-Tours FCT (7)
9.	FC Coullons-Cerdon (10)	0–4	RC Bouzy-Les Bordes (11)
10.	AFC Blois (8)	0–3	USM Saran (5)
11.	ESCALE Orléans (8)	5–1	UP Illiers-Combray (9)
12.	ES Chaingy-St Ay (8)	1–0	AS Baccon-Huisseau (9)
13.	FC Saint-Jean-le-Blanc (6)	2–1	US Châteauneuf-sur-Loire (5)
14.	ASL Orchaise (9)	3–2	USM Montargis (5)
15.	Luisant AC (7)	3–1	USM Olivet (7)
16.	Amicale de Lucé (8)	3–0	ACSF Dreux (9)
17.	J3S Amilly (6)	14–0	EE Pithiviers-le-Veil-Dadonville (11)
18.	Olympique Portugais Mehun-sur-Yèvre (9)	0–1 (a.e.t.)	Vierzon FC (5)
19.	FC Bléré Val de Cher (9)	2–4	EGC Touvent Châteauroux (9)
20.	US St Maur (9)	0–7	FC Ouest Tourangeau (5)
21.	SA Issoudun (9)	1–2	AS Montlouis-sur-Loire (5)
22.	FC Berry Touraine (11)	1–5	Avoine OCC (5)
23.	AS Ingrandes (11)	1–5	US Saint-Pierre-des-Corps (9)
24.	SC Massay (7)	2–1	ES La Ville-aux-Dames (8)
25.	ÉB Saint-Cyr-sur-Loire (5)	0–1	AS Portugais Bourges (6)
26.	St Georges Descartes (8)	0–8	Bourges 18 (5)
27.	ECF Bouzanne Vallée Noire (9)	1–4	ES Moulon Bourges (7)
28.	AS St Germain-du-Puy (8)	4–1 (a.e.t.)	US Monnaie (9)
29.	ASIE du Cher (10)	1–4	FC St Doulchard (7)
30.	ES Vallée Verte (10)	1–0	ES Poulaines (9)
31.	SC Châteauneuf-sur-Cher (10)	1–1 (4–2 p)	US Chitenay-Cellettes (8)
32.	US Montgivray (8)	0–5	FC Déolois (6)
33.	FC Avord (10)	5–4 (a.e.t.)	Avionnette Parçay-Meslay FC (11)
34.	CCSP Tours (8)	10–3	US Argenton-sur-Creuse (9)
35.	Cher-Sologne Football (8)	0–1	SC Azay-Cheillé (7)

=== Fourth round ===
These matches were played on 28 and 29 September 2019.

Fourth round results: Centre-Val de Loire
Tie no	Home team (tier)	Score	Away team (tier)
1.	Neuville Sports (9)	1–3	Tours FC (5)
2.	US Chambray-lès-Tours (6)	1–4	Blois Football 41 (4)
3.	ES Chaingy-St Ay (8)	1–6	C'Chartres Football (4)
4.	ES Maintenon-Pierres (8)	1–6	AS Montlouis-sur-Loire (5)
5.	ES Marigny 45 (10)	1–2	ESCALE Orléans (8)
6.	SC Malesherbes (8)	1–2 (a.e.t.)	Amicale de Lucé (8)
7.	RC Bouzy-Les Bordes (11)	0–5	FC Drouais (5)
8.	AG Boigny-Chécy-Mardié (9)	0–3	Saint-Pryvé Saint-Hilaire FC (4)
9.	Luisant AC (7)	2–3	J3S Amilly (6)
10.	USM Saran (5)	1–2 (a.e.t.)	FC Saint-Jean-le-Blanc (6)
11.	ES Moulon Bourges (7)	1–1 (4–5 p)	CCSP Tours (8)
12.	FC Ouest Tourangeau (5)	3–0 (Note: SC Châteauneuf-sur-Cher forfeited the match after a dispute with the League regarding where and when it should be played. FC Ouest Tourangeau qualify.)	SC Châteauneuf-sur-Cher (10)
13.	FC St Doulchard (7)	1–6	Avoine OCC (5)
14.	SC Massay (7)	0–1 (a.e.t.)	Bourges 18 (5)
15.	ES Vallée Verte (10)	2–1	AS Portugais Bourges (6)
16.	US Saint-Pierre-des-Corps (9)	3–5 (a.e.t.)	SC Azay-Cheillé (7)
17.	FC Avord (10)	1–5	FC Déolois (6)
18.	Vierzon FC (5)	1–2 (a.e.t.)	Bourges Foot (4)
19.	ASL Orchaise (9)	1–0	AS St Germain-du-Puy (8)
20.	EGC Touvent Châteauroux (9)	0–8	SO Romorantin (4)

=== Fifth round ===
These matches were played on 12 and 13 October 2019.

Fifth round results: Centre-Val de Loire
Tie no	Home team (tier)	Score	Away team (tier)
1.	Avoine OCC (5)	5–1	FC Déolois (6)
2.	J3S Amilly (6)	1–0	Bourges 18 (5)
3.	Tours FC (5)	2–0	FC Ouest Tourangeau (5)
4.	ESCALE Orléans (8)	0–1	Blois Football 41 (4)
5.	Amicale de Lucé (8)	0–1	AS Montlouis-sur-Loire (5)
6.	FC Drouais (5)	1–2 (a.e.t.)	FC Saint-Jean-le-Blanc (6)
7.	ASL Orchaise (9)	1–9	Saint-Pryvé Saint-Hilaire FC (4)
8.	SC Azay-Cheillé (7)	1–5 (a.e.t.)	C'Chartres Football (4)
9.	ES Vallée Verte (10)	1–1 (3–5 p)	CCSP Tours (8)
10.	Bourges Foot (4)	2–2 (3–2 p)	SO Romorantin (4)

=== Sixth round ===
These matches were played on 26 and 27 October 2019.

Sixth round results: Centre-Val de Loire
Tie no	Home team (tier)	Score	Away team (tier)
1.	Blois Football 41 (4)	1–1 (2–4 p)	AS Montlouis-sur-Loire (5)
2.	Bourges Foot (4)	4–1	Avoine OCC (5)
3.	CCSP Tours (8)	0–2	C'Chartres Football (4)
4.	FC Saint-Jean-le-Blanc (6)	1–5	Saint-Pryvé Saint-Hilaire FC (4)
5.	J3S Amilly (6)	1–1 (2–4 p)	Tours FC (5)
