= 2017–18 Coupe de France preliminary rounds, Centre-Val de Loire =

The 2017–18 Coupe de France preliminary rounds, Centre-Val de Loire make up the qualifying competition to decide which teams from the French Centre-Val de Loire region take part in the main competition from the seventh round.

== preliminary round ==
The matches in Centre-Val de Loire were played on 20 August and 3 September 2017.

preliminary round results: Centre-Val de Loire

| Tie no | Home team (tier) | Score | Away team (tier) |
|---|---|---|---|
| 1. | FC Dry (12) | 0–3 (Note: Game won through forfeit.) | CA St Laurent-Nouan (10) |
| 2. | FC Boigny-sur-Bionne (9) | 2–1 | US Selommes (9) |
| 3. | AS Suèvres (11) | 0–9 | ES Chaingy-St Ay (10) |
| 4. | FC Lutz-en-Dunois (10) | 0–3 | UP Illiers-Combray (10) |
| 5. | CEP La Ferté-Vidame (10) | 0–1 | EE Pithiviers-le-Veil-Dadonville (10) |
| 6. | AS Tout Horizon Dreux (9) | 1–0 | Avenir Amilly-Cintray (10) |
| 7. | AS Ste Gemme-Moronval (10) | 0–1 (a.e.t.) | ES Jouy-St Prest (10) |
| 8. | CAN Portugais Chartres (9) | 7–0 | Amicale Gallardon (9) |
| 9. | MSD Chartres (11) | 2–0 | USS Portugais Orléans (11) |
| 10. | SC Malesherbes (9) | 1–2 (a.e.t.) | ES Marigny 45 (10) |
| 11. | CS Angerville-Pussay (10) | 3–1 | Etoile Marsauceux (11) |
| 12. | US St Cyr-en-Val (11) | 2–6 | Neuville Sports (9) |
| 13. | Olympique Portugais Mehun-sur-Yèvre (10) | 3–4 | Diables Rouges Selles-St Denis (9) |
| 14. | FC Fussy-St Martin-Vigneux (10) | 3–1 | US Poilly-Autry (11) |
| 15. | FC Coullons-Cerdon (11) | 2–5 | ES Aubigny (9) |
| 16. | FC Avord (11) | 4–0 (a.e.t.) | USA Lury-Méreau (10) |
| 17. | SC Châteauneuf-sur-Cher (9) | 7–0 | US Dun-sur-Auron (10) |
| 18. | FC Bas Berry (10) | 1–0 | FC de la Marche Occitane (10) |
| 19. | FC Chezal-Benoît (12) | 0–4 | EGC Touvent Châteauroux (9) |
| 20. | AS Préveranges (11) | 6–3 | FC Le Châtelet-Culan (11) |
| 21. | CA Montrichard (9) | 6–2 | ES Poulaines (9) |
| 22. | ES Vineuil-Brion (11) | 0–7 | FC Bléré Val de Cher (9) |
| 23. | Vernou-Neung-Courmemin Foot (9) | 0–2 | ES Vallée Verte (10) |
| 24. | FC Azay-sur-Cher (10) | 0–4 | Loches AC (9) |
| 25. | AF Bouchardais (10) | 7–0 (Note: US Le Blanc penalised for fielding an ineligible player. AF Bouchardais qualify. Original results not known.) | US Le Blanc (10) |
| 26. | ACS Buzançais (10) | 1–1 (2–4 p) | FC Levroux (9) |
| 27. | RC Val Sud Touraine (11) | 3–4 | AS Ingrandes (10) |
| 28. | US Yzeures-Preuilly (11) | 3–1 (Note: Match was replayed after the original fixture was abandoned with 65 minutes played, due to a pitch invasion.) | AS Aubrière (11) |
| 29. | JS Cormeray (10) | 0–3 | AS Villedômer (10) |
| 30. | SLO Mazières-de-Touraine (11) | 1–3 | USC Châtres-Langon-Mennetou (9) |
| 31. | FC Lamembrolle-Mettray (10) | 0–6 | AC Amboise (9) |
| 32. | AS Nazelles-Négron (11) | 0–4 | ES Villebarou (10) |

== First round ==
The matches in Centre-Val de Loire were played between 19 August and 10 September 2017.

First round results: Centre-Val de Loire

| Tie no | Home team (tier) | Score | Away team (tier) |
|---|---|---|---|
| 1. | Avenir St Amand-Longpré (10) | 0–4 | US Vallée du Loir (10) |
| 2. | US Mer (8) | 0–3 | US Beaugency Val-de-Loire (7) |
| 3. | OC Châteaudun (7) | 9–0 | US Vendôme (8) |
| 4. | Stade Loupéen (10) | 0–3 (Note: Game won through forfeit.) | Etoile Brou (9) |
| 5. | CA Ouzouer-le-Marché (8) | 1–0 | CS Lusitanos Beaugency (8) |
| 6. | FC Haut Vendômois (11) | 0–3 | FC Rémois (9) |
| 7. | FC Magdunois (9) | 0–9 | FC St Georges-sur-Eure (7) |
| 8. | ES Nogent-le-Roi (8) | 0–1 | ES Maintenon-Pierres (9) |
| 9. | Avenir Ymonville (8) | 5–4 (a.e.t.) | ESCALE Orléans (8) |
| 10. | CD Espagnol Orléans (11) | 0–4 | Amicale de Lucé (7) |
| 11. | FC Mandorais (10) | 1–1 (1–3 p) | FCM Ingré (7) |
| 12. | Amicale Sours (8) | 3–9 | CA Pithiviers (7) |
| 13. | FJ Champhol (10) | 1–4 | ES Gâtinaise (8) |
| 14. | USM Olivet (8) | 3–2 | Amicale Épernon (8) |
| 15. | St Denis-en-Val FC (10) | 0–3 | ES Nancray-Chambon-Nibelle (8) |
| 16. | AS Anet (11) | 0–3 | Dammarie Foot Bois-Gueslin (8) |
| 17. | Luisant AC (8) | 9–0 | FC Perche Senonchoise (10) |
| 18. | FCO Saint-Jean-de-la-Ruelle (10) | 2–3 (a.e.t.) | ACSF Dreux (8) |
| 19. | Jargeau-St Denis FC (10) | 4–2 (a.e.t.) | US Beaune-la-Rolande (8) |
| 20. | AS Corbeilles (10) | 1–5 | SMOC St Jean-de-Braye (7) |
| 21. | CS Mainvilliers (7) | 3–0 | AS Châteauneuf-en-Thymerais (8) |
| 22. | US Briare (10) | 4–1 | CL Bonny (10) |
| 23. | ES Trouy (9) | 3–0 | Stade Savigny-en-Sancerre (10) |
| 24. | SS La Solognote Souesmes (10) | 1–5 | Santranges FC (10) |
| 25. | RC Bouzy-Les-Bordes (10) | 1–3 | US Henrichemont-Menetou-Salon (8) |
| 26. | US Sancerre (10) | 3–0 (Note: Gazelec Bourges penalised for fielding a suspended player. US Sancerre qualify. Original result 1–2 (a.e.t.).) | Gazelec Bourges (8) |
| 27. | AS Nouan-Lamotte (10) | 2–4 | ES Moulon Bourges (8) |
| 28. | AS Isdes-Vannes-Villemurlin-Viglain (12) | 1–8 | US Dampierre-en-Burly (9) |
| 29. | US La-Ferté-St Aubin (9) | 3–4 | SC Massay (9) |
| 30. | Olympique Mehunois (9) | 0–4 | CS Vignoux-sur-Barangeon (8) |
| 31. | FC St Doulchard (8) | 2–2 (2–3 p) | CSM Sully-sur-Loire (8) |
| 32. | SL Chaillot Vierzon (11) | 1–1 (4–3 p) | AS St Germain-du-Puy (8) |
| 33. | US Le Pêchereau (10) | 0–3 (Note: US Le Pêchereau penalised for fielding a suspended player. Black Roosters FC qualify. Original result not known.) | Black Roosters FC (11) |
| 34. | US St Just (12) | 3–7 | Olympique Morthomiers (11) |
| 35. | US Plaimpied Givaudins (11) | 0–7 | AS Orval (8) |
| 36. | Espoire Pont-Chrétien-Chabenet (11) | 0–1 | US St Florent-sur-Cher (10) |
| 37. | US Le Poinçonnet (8) | 2–0 | AS St Gaultier-Thenay (9) |
| 38. | Mots'Z'arts Châteauroux (10) | 0–11 | US Montgivray (9) |
| 39. | AS Chapelloise (10) | 1–2 | FR Velles (9) |
| 40. | FC Diors (8) | 10–0 | US Aigurande (9) |
| 41. | US St Maur (9) | 1–6 | US La Châtre (8) |
| 42. | ECF Bouzanne Vallée Noire (10) | 1–5 | Avenir Lignières (9) |
| 43. | AS Arthon (9) | 3–2 (a.e.t.) | ES St Plantaire-Cuzion-Orsennes (10) |
| 44. | SS Cluis (11) | 0–4 | AC Parnac Val d'Abloux (8) |
| 45. | US Châteaumeillant (9) | 6–5 | US Argenton-sur-Creuse (8) |
| 46. | US Montierchaume (11) | 1–1 (5–4 p) | US Brenne Vendœuvres (10) |
| 47. | AJ St Romanaise (11) | 0–8 | AS Contres (7) |
| 48. | ES Villefranche-sur-Cher (9) | 1–1 (1–2 p) | US Portugaise Joué-lès-Tours (7) |
| 49. | AJS Mont Bracieux (8) | 2–0 | AC Villers-les-Ormes (9) |
| 50. | Joué-lès-Tours FC Touraine (9) | 3–0 | Etoile Châteauroux (10) |
| 51. | AS Esvres (11) | 2–4 | US Chambray-lès-Tours (7) |
| 52. | US Reuilly (9) | 0–2 | US Billy (9) |
| 53. | US Selles-sur-Cher (8) | 3–1 | SC Vatan(9) |
| 54. | St Georges Descartes (8) | 1–1 (3–4 p) | AS Monts (8) |
| 55. | JAS Moulins-sur-Céphons (11) | 1–4 | US Villedieu-sur-Indre (8) |
| 56. | AS Fondettes (10) | 1–6 | Langeais Cinq-Mars Foot (8) |
| 57. | US Argy (11) | 0–13 | SC Azay-Cheillé (7) |
| 58. | JL Val-de-Creuse (11) | 0–9 | Le Richelais (8) |
| 59. | FC Pellevoisin (12) | 1–14 | ES Bourgueil (10) |
| 60. | ES St Benoît-la-Forêt (11) | 0–6 | FC St Maure-Maillé (10) |
| 61. | Espérance Hippolytaine (11) | 4–3 | FC Beaumont-en-Véron (10) |
| 62. | ES La Ville-aux-Dames (8) | 0–2 | CCSP Tours (9) |
| 63. | US Renaudine (9) | 2–4 | AS Chouzy-Onzain (8) |
| 64. | US Pernay (10) | 0–3 | ASJ La Chaussée-St-Victor (8) |
| 65. | AFC Blois (7) | 3–1 | ES Oésienne (8) |
| 66. | ASL Orchaise (11) | 1–0 | US Monnaie (10) |
| 67. | US Chitenay-Cellettes (8) | 0–3 | Racing La Riche-Tours (7) |
| 68. | Avionnette Parçay-Meslay FC (10) | 3–5 | ASC Portugais Blois (8) |
| 69. | ES Chaingy-St Ay (10) | 14–1 | CA St Laurent-Nouan (10) |
| 70. | UP Illiers-Combray (10) | 1–5 | FC Boigny-sur-Bionne (9) |
| 71. | ES Jouy-St Prest (10) | 2–0 | MSD Chartres (11) |
| 72. | CS Angerville-Pussay (10) | 0–6 | CAN Portugais Chartres (9) |
| 73. | ES Marigny 45 (10) | 0–3 | AS Tout Horizon Dreux (9) |
| 74. | Neuville Sports (9) | 3–2 | EE Pithiviers-le-Veil-Dadonville (10) |
| 75. | ES Aubigny (9) | 1–4 | FC Fussy-St Martin-Vigneux (10) |
| 76. | FC Avord (11) | 3–1 | Diables Rouges Selles-St Denis (9) |
| 77. | EGC Touvent Châteauroux (9) | 0–1 | FC Bas Berry (10) |
| 78. | AS Préveranges (11) | 1–10 | SC Châteauneuf-sur-Cher (9) |
| 79. | Loches AC (9) | 1–2 | CA Montrichard (9) |
| 80. | FC Bléré Val de Cher (9) | 2–1 | ES Vallée Verte (10) |
| 81. | AS Ingrandes (10) | 3–2 | AF Bouchardais (10) |
| 82. | US Yzeures-Preuilly (11) | 2–1 | FC Levroux (9) |
| 83. | AS Villedômer (10) | 1–2 | USC Châtres-Langon-Mennetou (9) |
| 84. | AC Amboise (9) | 5–1 (a.e.t.) | ES Villebarou (10) |

== Second round ==
These matches were played between 30 August and 17 September 2017.

Second round results: Centre-Val de Loire

| Tie no | Home team (tier) | Score | Away team (tier) |
|---|---|---|---|
| 1. | US Beaugency Val-de-Loire (7) | 2–4 | OC Châteaudun (7) |
| 2. | Etoile Brou (9) | 1–2 | FC St Georges-sur-Eure (7) |
| 3. | FC Rémois (9) | 4–5 (a.e.t.) | US Vallée du Loir (10) |
| 4. | CA Ouzouer-le-Marché (8) | 0–2 | Vineuil SF (6) |
| 5. | Dammarie Foot Bois-Gueslin (8) | 2–2 (5–4 p) | CS Mainvilliers (7) |
| 6. | Jargeau-St Denis FC (10) | 0–2 | SMOC St Jean-de-Braye (7) |
| 7. | ES Gâtinaise (8) | 4–1 | Luisant AC (8) |
| 8. | ES Nancray-Chambon-Nibelle (8) | 1–2 | FC St Jean-le-Blanc (6) |
| 9. | Avenir Ymonville (8) | 2–3 (a.e.t.) | USM Saran (6) |
| 10. | Amicale de Lucé (7) | 2–3 (a.e.t.) | ES Maintenon-Pierres (9) |
| 11. | CA Pithiviers (7) | 1–1 (2–3 p) | FCM Ingré (7) |
| 12. | ACSF Dreux (8) | 1–0 (a.e.t.) | USM Olivet (8) |
| 13. | CSM Sully-sur-Loire (8) | 2–2 (5–4 p) | J3S Amilly (6) |
| 14. | Santranges FC (10) | 1–2 | CS Vignoux-sur-Barangeon (8) |
| 15. | SL Chaillot Vierzon (11) | 1–2 | US Sancerre (10) |
| 16. | SC Massay (9) | 4–1 | ES Moulon Bourges (8) |
| 17. | US Henrichemont-Menetou-Salon (8) | 3–2 | ES Trouy (9) |
| 18. | US Dampierre-en-Burly (9) | 5–0 | US Briare (10) |
| 19. | Black Roosters FC (11) | 0–3 | FC Diors (8) |
| 20. | FR Velles (9) | 1–2 | AC Parnac Val d'Abloux (8) |
| 21. | Olympique Morthomiers (11) | 3–5 | Avenir Lignières (9) |
| 22. | AS Arthon (9) | 0–4 | AS St Amandoise (6) |
| 23. | US St Florent-sur-Cher (10) | 3–0 | US Montierchaume (11) |
| 24. | US Châteaumeillant (9) | 0–0 (3–4 p) | AS Portugais Bourges (6) |
| 25. | US La Châtre (8) | 0–2 | US Montgivray (9) |
| 26. | AS Orval (8) | 2–3 | US Le Poinçonnet (8) |
| 27. | US Billy (9) | 0–3 | AJS Mont Bracieux (8) |
| 28. | Joué-lès-Tours FC Touraine (9) | 0–2 | US Portugaise Joué-lès-Tours (7) |
| 29. | SA Issoudun (6) | 1–3 | AS Contres (7) |
| 30. | US Chambray-lès-Tours (7) | 4–0 | US Selles-sur-Cher (8) |
| 31. | US Villedieu-sur-Indre (8) | 2–4 (a.e.t.) | Langeais Cinq-Mars Foot (8) |
| 32. | Le Richelais (8) | 0–3 | FC Déolois (6) |
| 33. | Espérance Hippolytaine (11) | 1–2 | US Saint-Pierre-des-Corps (6) |
| 34. | ES Bourgueil (10) | 1–2 | SC Azay-Cheillé (7) |
| 35. | FC St Maure-Maillé (10) | 0–2 | AS Monts (8) |
| 36. | ASL Orchaise (11) | 1–3 | AFC Blois (7) |
| 37. | Racing La Riche-Tours (7) | 0–6 | AS Montlouis-sur-Loire (6) |
| 38. | ASJ La Chaussée-St-Victor (8) | 2–1 | ASC Portugais Blois (8) |
| 39. | AS Chouzy-Onzain (8) | 0–1 | CCSP Tours (9) |
| 40. | FC Boigny-sur-Bionne (9) | 2–1 | ES Chaingy-St Ay (10) |
| 41. | AS Tout Horizon Dreux (9) | 4–2 | ES Jouy-St Prest (10) |
| 42. | CAN Portugais Chartres (9) | 3–0 | Neuville Sports (9) |
| 43. | FC Fussy-St Martin-Vigneux (10) | 4–0 | FC Avord (11) |
| 44. | SC Châteauneuf-sur-Cher (9) | 2–2 (2–3 p) | FC Bas Berry (10) |
| 45. | CA Montrichard (9) | 0–4 | FC Bléré Val de Cher (9) |
| 46. | US Yzeures-Preuilly (11) | 5–0 | AS Ingrandes (10) |
| 47. | USC Châtres-Langon-Mennetou (9) | 0–1 | AC Amboise (9) |

== Third round ==
These matches were played between 9 and 24 September 2017.

Third round results: Centre-Val de Loire

| Tie no | Home team (tier) | Score | Away team (tier) |
|---|---|---|---|
| 1. | OC Châteaudun (7) | 4–1 | ES Gâtinaise (8) |
| 2. | FC Boigny-sur-Bionne (9) | 1–0 (a.e.t.) | AS Tout Horizon Dreux (9) |
| 3. | ASJ La Chaussée-St-Victor (8) | 0–3 | USM Saran (6) |
| 4. | SMOC St Jean-de-Braye (7) | 0–1 | FCM Ingré (7) |
| 5. | US Dampierre-en-Burly (9) | 2–4 | AFC Blois (7) |
| 6. | ES Maintenon-Pierres (9) | 1–4 | Étoile Bleue Saint-Cyr-sur-Loire (5) |
| 7. | US Vallée du Loir (10) | 2–8 | FC St Jean-le-Blanc (6) |
| 8. | USM Montargis (5) | 1–0 | Vineuil SF (6) |
| 9. | FC St Georges-sur-Eure (7) | 5–0 | CSM Sully-sur-Loire (8) |
| 10. | AJS Mont Bracieux (8) | 1–1 (3–4 p) | CAN Portugais Chartres (9) |
| 11. | Chartres Horizon (5) | 0–2 | US Châteauneuf-sur-Loire (5) |
| 12. | ACSF Dreux (8) | 0–3 | FC Drouais (5) |
| 13. | Dammarie Foot Bois-Gueslin (8) | 3–5 | AS Montlouis-sur-Loire (6) |
| 14. | AS St Amandoise (6) | 1–3 | US Portugaise Joué-lès-Tours (7) |
| 15. | US Sancerre (10) | 0–7 | Blois Football 41 (5) |
| 16. | CS Vignoux-sur-Barangeon (8) | 3–2 | Langeais Cinq-Mars Foot (8) |
| 17. | AC Amboise (9) | 3–1 | US Henrichemont-Menetou-Salon (8) |
| 18. | CCSP Tours (9) | 1–6 | Avoine OCC (5) |
| 19. | FC Bléré Val de Cher (9) | 1–2 | US Saint-Pierre-des-Corps (6) |
| 20. | US Montgivray (9) | 0–1 | AS Contres (7) |
| 21. | SC Azay-Cheillé (7) | 1–2 | Vierzon FC (5) |
| 22. | SC Massay (9) | 1–4 | AS Portugais Bourges (6) |
| 23. | US Le Poinçonnet (8) | 4–7 | US Chambray-lès-Tours (7) |
| 24. | AS Monts (8) | 1–2 | Bourges Foot (5) |
| 25. | FC Ouest Tourangeau (5) | 2–0 | FC Déolois (6) |
| 26. | FC Bas Berry (10) | 1–1 (2–5 p) | US St Florent-sur-Cher (10) |
| 27. | US Yzeures-Preuilly (11) | 3–0 | FC Fussy-St Martin-Vigneux (10) |
| 28. | Avenir Lignières (9) | 4–0 | FC Diors (8) |
| 29. | AC Parnac Val d'Abloux (8) | 1–2 | Bourges 18 (5) |

== Fourth round ==
These matches were played between 23 September and 1 October 2017.

Fourth round results: Centre-Val de Loire

| Tie no | Home team (tier) | Score | Away team (tier) |
|---|---|---|---|
| 1. | Saint-Pryvé Saint-Hilaire FC (4) | 2–1 | FC Drouais (5) |
| 2. | AS Contres (7) | 2–4 | FC Ouest Tourangeau (5) |
| 3. | Avoine OCC (5) | 3–0 | Blois Football 41 (5) |
| 4. | Bourges 18 (5) | 1–2 | SO Romorantin (4) |
| 5. | AS Montlouis-sur-Loire (6) | 1–0 | US Chambray-lès-Tours (7) |
| 6. | OC Châteaudun (7) | 1–2 | FC Chartres (4) |
| 7. | US Châteauneuf-sur-Loire (5) | 2–1 | USM Montargis (5) |
| 8. | Avenir Lignières (9) | 0–1 | AFC Blois (7) |
| 9. | CS Vignoux-sur-Barangeon (8) | 1–2 | Vierzon FC (5) |
| 10. | FCM Ingré (7) | 0–1 | US Saint-Pierre-des-Corps (6) |
| 11. | CAN Portugais Chartres (9) | 0–4 | Bourges Foot (5) |
| 12. | AC Amboise (9) | 4–4 (3–4 p) | FC St Georges-sur-Eure (7) |
| 13. | FC Boigny-sur-Bionne (9) | 0–4 | AS Portugais Bourges (6) |
| 14. | US St Florent-sur-Cher (10) | 1–7 | Étoile Bleue Saint-Cyr-sur-Loire (5) |
| 15. | US Portugaise Joué-lès-Tours (7) | 2–5 | FC St Jean-le-Blanc (6) |
| 16. | US Yzeures-Preuilly (11) | 0–2 | USM Saran (6) |

== Fifth round ==
These matches were played on 7 and 8 October 2017.

Fifth round results: Centre-Val de Loire

| Tie no | Home team (tier) | Score | Away team (tier) |
|---|---|---|---|
| 1. | Bourges Foot (5) | 1–2 | Avoine OCC (5) |
| 2. | FC St Georges-sur-Eure (7) | 4–3 | US Châteauneuf-sur-Loire (5) |
| 3. | US Saint-Pierre-des-Corps (6) | 0–1 (a.e.t.) | Vierzon FC (5) |
| 4. | FC Ouest Tourangeau (5) | 3–0 | AS Montlouis-sur-Loire (6) |
| 5. | AFC Blois (7) | 0–3 | SO Romorantin (4) |
| 6. | USM Saran (6) | 2–1 | Étoile Bleue Saint-Cyr-sur-Loire (5) |
| 7. | FC St Jean-le-Blanc (6) | 1–4 | FC Chartres (4) |
| 8. | AS Portugais Bourges (6) | 0–2 | Saint-Pryvé Saint-Hilaire FC (4) |

== Sixth round ==
These matches were played on 21 and 22 October 2017.

Sixth round results: Centre-Val de Loire

| Tie no | Home team (tier) | Score | Away team (tier) |
|---|---|---|---|
| 1. | FC St Georges-sur-Eure (7) | 0–4 | Avoine OCC (5) |
| 2. | SO Romorantin (4) | 4–0 | FC Ouest Tourangeau (5) |
| 3. | Saint-Pryvé Saint-Hilaire FC (4) | 1–2 | Vierzon FC (5) |
| 4. | USM Saran (6) | 0–2 | FC Chartres (4) |
