= 2020–21 Coupe de France preliminary rounds, Centre-Val de Loire =

Sporting competition

The 2020–21 Coupe de France preliminary rounds, Centre-Val de Loire was the qualifying competition to decide which teams from the leagues of the Centre-Val de Loire region of France took part in the main competition from the seventh round.

A total of four teams qualified from the Centre-Val de Loire Preliminary rounds. In 2019–20, Saint-Pryvé Saint-Hilaire FC progressed furthest in the main competition, reaching the round of 32 before losing to Monaco 1–3.

== Schedule ==
A total of 256 teams entered from the region. The draw required a Preliminary round involving 178 clubs from the district divisions and Régional 3 on 30 August 2020. The 59 clubs from the regional division (other than those Régional 3 clubs already entered) entered at the first round stage on 6 September 2020. The draw for the preliminary, first and second rounds was made on 21 July 2020.

The third round draw, which saw the entry of the Championnat National 3 clubs, was made on 10 September 2020. The fourth round draw, which saw the entry of the Championnat National 2 clubs, was made on 24 September 2020. The fifth round draw, which saw the single Championnat National side from the region enter the competition, was made on 8 October 2020. The sixth round draw was made on 20 October 2020.

=== Preliminary round ===
These matches were played on 29 and 30 August 2020, with one postponed until 3 September 2020.

Preliminary round results: Centre-Val de Loire
Tie no	Home team (tier)	Score	Away team (tier)
1.	AS Tréon (12)	3–2	RC Bû Abondant (11)
2.	Amicale Courvilloise (9)	3–3 (5–3 p)	FC Lèves (10)
3.	CO Cherisy (10)	7–5	FJ Champhol (8)
4.	FC Tremblay-les-Villages (9)	1–0	Avenir Ymonville (8)
5.	US Brezolles (11)	1–5	ACSF Dreux (9)
6.	ES Beauceronne (10)	2–6	US Vallée du Loir (9)
7.	CS Oucques (10)	7–1	AS La Bazoche-Gouet (11)
8.	CA Ouzouer-le-Marché (9)	2–1 (Note: Tie reversed from original draw.)	La Gauloise Foot (11)
9.	RS Patay (12)	1–0	UP Illiers-Combray (9)
10.	Amicale Gallardon (10)	3–2	US Alluyes (11)
11.	OC Châteaudun (9)	0–3	AS Baccon-Huisseau (8)
12.	FC Lucé Ouest (10)	0–6	Dammarie Foot Bois-Gueslin (8)
13.	AS Nogent-le-Rotrou (13)	2–5 (Note: FC Beauvoir penalised for fielding a suspended player. AS Nogent-le-Rotrou qualify.)	FC Beauvoir (10)
14.	US Pontoise (11)	3–1	SA Marboué (10)
15.	AMSD Chartres (11)	1–6	Auneau FC (11)
16.	CAN Portugais Chartres (10)	4–1	Béville SF (11)
17.	Amicale Sours (9)	6–1	CS Angerville-Pussay (9)
18.	AC Bréhémont (11)	1–7	OC Tours (10)
19.	CS Tourangeau Veigne (11)	2–4	AS Villiers-au-Bouin (9)
20.	US Ports-Nouâtre (11)	0–3	US Véronaise (10)
21.	ES Oésienne (10)	0–2	FC Véretz-Azay-Larçay (10)
22.	AS Fondettes (9)	1–1 (3–2 p)	US Saint-Pierre-des-Corps (9)
23.	AS Pays de Racan (10)	3–4	SC La Croix-en-Touraine (11)
24.	US Monnaie (9)	2–2 (5–4 p)	AS Chanceaux (9)
25.	US Saint-Nicolas-de-Bourgueil (12)	0–2	US Pernay (11)
26.	ASPO Tours (11)	4–3	FC Gâtine Choisilles (10)
27.	AS de la Vallée du Lys (12)	2–4	AS Villedômer (10)
28.	Football Choisille Lamembrolle-Mettray (10)	4–3	AS Tours Sud (11)
29.	JS Cormeray (10)	2–1	AS Suèvres (10)
30.	ES Chargé (10)	4–1	AS Chailles-Candé 99 (10)
31.	ASC Turque Blois (11)	0–1	ES Villebarou (9)
32.	US Fougères Ouchamps Feings (11)	1–2	ASC Portugais Blois (9)
33.	AS Nazelles-Négron (11)	0–6	Avenir Saint-Amand-Longpré (8)
34.	AS Cléry-Mareau (11)	2–2 (4–5 p)	CS Lusitanos Beaugency (9)
35.	US Renaudine (9)	4–1	FC Bléré Val de Cher (9)
36.	Ormes-Saint-Péravy FC (11)	0–3	ASL Orchaise (9)
37.	AG Boigny-Chécy-Mardié (9)	3–1	FCO Saint-Jean-de-la-Ruelle (9)
38.	US Fertesienne (10)	0–3 (Note: Tie won by means of forfeit.)	CO BRGM Orléans (11)
39.	COS Marcilly-en-Villette (10)	2–2 (3–4 p)	US Saint-Cyr-en-Val (11)
40.	USS Portugais Orléans (10)	3–1	Saint-Denis-en-Val FC (11)
41.	ES Loges et Forêt (9)	4–1	CD Espagnol Orléans (10)
42.	FC Coullons-Cerdon (10)	1–3	AS Nouan-Lamotte (9)
43.	FC Semoy (10)	1–0	Jargeau-Saint-Denis FC (10)
44.	RC Bouzy-Les Bordes (10)	0–2	ES Marigny (9)
45.	FC Vallée de l'Ouanne (9)	2–4	US Châlette (10)
46.	FC Mandorais (10)	4–1	EE Pithiviers-le-Veil-Dadonville (11)
47.	US Turcs Châlette (10)	0–3	SC Malesherbes (9)
48.	ES Nancray-Chambon-Nibelle (9)	0–1	Neuville Sports (9)
49.	US Ousson-sur-Loire (10)	0–7	ES Gâtinaise (8)
50.	FC Martizay Mézières Tournon (9)	0–6	AC Parnac Val d'Abloux (9)
51.	AS Ingrandes (11)	2–2 (4–3 p)	ACS Buzançais (9)
52.	ES Val de Veude (11)	2–2 (2–4 p)	ES Bourgueil (9)
53.	FC Berry Touraine (10)	1–3	US Yzeures-Preuilly (9)
54.	US Villedieu-sur-Indre (10)	1–1 (3–2 p)	Loches AC (10)
55.	JL Val de Creuse (11)	1–3	Entente Arpheuilles-Clion-Saulnay (10)
56.	AF Bouchardais (11)	1–7	FC Étoile Verte (9)
57.	US Montbazon (11)	4–1	AS Esvres (10)
58.	AS Niherne (10)	0–1	FC de la Marche Occitane (10)
59.	US Pouillé-Mareuil (11)	2–0	AJS Théséenne (11)
60.	US Argy (11)	0–8	US Gâtines (10)
61.	AS Chabris (10)	3–0	ES Vineuil-Brion (10)
62.	ES Villefranche-sur-Cher (10)	1–0	USC Châtres-Langon-Mennetou (9)
63.	US Buxeuil (12)	1–4	FC Levroux (9)
64.	AC Villers-les-Ormes (11)	3–0	ES Poulaines (9)
65.	US Pruniers-en-Sologne (9)	2–0	FC Portugais Selles-sur-Cher
66.	AS Les Bordes (11)	6–2	Liniez AC (11)
67.	JS de la Montagne (11)	0–1	US Reuilly (9)
68.	JAS Moulins-sur-Céphons (10)	1–4	Saint-Roch City Romorantin (10)
69.	US Nançay-Neuvy-Vouzeron (10)	0–4	US Poilly-Autry (10)
70.	CS Foëcy (11)	0–1	SL Chaillot Vierzon (9)
71.	US Sainte-Solange (12)	2–1	Olympique Mehunois (10)
72.	USA Lury-Méreau (10)	0–2	Olympique Portugais Mehun-sur-Yèvre (9)
73.	US Briare (11)	2–3	FC Verdigny Sancerre (9)
74.	CS Argentais (11)	1–6	AS Salbris (10)
75.	AS Gien (11)	0–3	Bonny-Beaulieu FC (10)
76.	US Châteaumeillant-Le Châtelet-Culan (10)	1–7	SA Issoudun (9)
77.	US Aigurande (9)	4–0	EGC Touvent Châteauroux (9)
78.	FC Sacierges-Saint-Martin/Saint-Civran/Roussines/Prissac (13)	0–0 (4–5 p)	FC Velles-Arthon-La Pérouille 36 (9)
79.	La Patriote Ambrault (10)	8–0	US Montierchaume (10)
80.	Étoile Châteauroux (10)	1–1 (3–5 p)	AS Neuvy-Pailloux (10)
81.	SS Cluis (11)	0–4	AS Jeu-les-Bois (11)
82.	FC Saint-Denis-de-Jouhet/Sarzay (11)	2–1	ES Étrechet (10)
83.	FC Avord (10)	3–0	US Saint-Florent-sur-Cher (10)
84.	Olympique Morthomiers (10)	0–2	US Dun-sur-Auron (10)
85.	ASIE du Cher (10)	2–5	SC Châteauneuf-sur-Cher (9)
86.	ES Justices Bourges (11)	4–1	Avenir de la Septaine (10)
87.	ASC Levet (12)	1–4	Avenir Lignières (9)
88.	ES Vallée Verte (9)	1–1 (5–4 p)	AS Monts (8)
89.	US La Châtre (8)	3–1	ECF Bouzanne Vallée Noire (9)

=== First round ===
These matches were played on 5 and 6 September 2020.

First round results: Centre-Val de Loire
Tie no	Home team (tier)	Score	Away team (tier)
1.	Amicale Épernon (8)	0–1	FC Drouais (6)
2.	ACSF Dreux (9)	0–1	ES Maintenon-Pierres (8)
3.	CO Cherisy (10)	1–1 (3–2 p)	AS Baccon-Huisseau (8)
4.	AS Tréon (12)	4–0	Amicale Courvilloise (9)
5.	ES Nogent-le-Roi (7)	1–2	AS Tout Horizon Dreux (8)
6.	RS Patay (12)	1–2	FC Tremblay-les-Villages (9)
7.	US Vallée du Loir (9)	5–1	AS Nogent-le-Rotrou (13)
8.	Football Choisille Lamembrolle-Mettray (10)	1–4	US Portugaise Joué-lès-Tours (7)
9.	US Pontoise (11)	2–4	
10.	CS Oucques (10)	5–1	CA Ouzouer-le-Marché (9)
11.	Amicale Sours (9)	1–2	CS Mainvilliers (7)
12.	CAN Portugais Chartres (10)	3–5	FC Saint-Georges-sur-Eure (6)
13.	Auneau FC (11)	0–3	Dammarie Foot Bois-Gueslin (8)
14.	Luisant AC (7)	1–3	Amicale de Lucé (8)
15.	SC La Croix-en-Touraine (11)	1–1 (7–8 p)	Racing La Riche-Tours (8)
16.	OC Tours (10)	1–1 (5–4 p)	CCSP Tours (7)
17.	US Véronaise (10)	1–5	US Chambray-lès-Tours (6)
18.	ÉB Saint-Cyr-sur-Loire (6)	4–0 (Note: Tie reversed from original draw.)	ES La Ville-aux-Dames (8)
19.	AS Fondettes (9)	1–4	Joué-lès-Tours FCT (7)
20.	AS Villiers-au-Bouin (9)	0–2	ES Vallée Verte (9)
21.	US Pernay (11)	0–1	Langeais Cinq-Mars Foot (8)
22.	FC Véretz-Azay-Larçay (10)	1–3	ASPO Tours (11)
23.	AS Villedômer (10)	0–4	US Monnaie (9)
24.	ASL Orchaise (9)	2–1	US Vendôme (8)
25.	US Renaudine (9)	2–1	AS Chouzy-Onzain (8)
26.	ASJ La Chaussée-Saint-Victor (7)	0–0 (4–2 p)	US Beaugency Val-de-Loire (7)
27.	CS Lusitanos Beaugency (9)	3–1	US Mer (8)
28.	JS Cormeray (10)	0–4	US Chitenay-Cellettes (8)
29.	ES Chargé (10)	0–4	Vineuil SF (6)
30.	AFC Blois (8)	0–0 (4–5 p)	AS Contres (6)
31.	Avenir Saint-Amand-Longpré (8)	0–0 (5–3 p)	ES Villebarou (9)
32.	ASC Portugais Blois (9)	1–0	CA Montrichard (8)
33.	AS Nouan-Lamotte (9)	1–0	CO BRGM Orléans (11)
34.	USM Olivet (7)	3–3 (3–1 p)	ESCALE Orléans (8)
35.	US Saint-Cyr-en-Val (11)	0–4	SMOC Saint-Jean-de-Braye (8)
36.	USS Portugais Orléans (10)	0–9	FCM Ingré (7)
37.	ES Marigny (9)	3–0	CJF Fleury-les-Aubrais (8)
38.	AG Boigny-Chécy-Mardié (9)	1–1 (3–4 p)	FC Semoy (10)
39.	ES Loges et Forêt (9)	0–2	ES Chaingy-Saint-Ay (7)
40.	US Châlette (10)	1–3	FC Mandorais (10)
41.	SC Malesherbes (9)	4–0	US Dampierre-en-Burly (8)
42.	ES Gâtinaise (8)	2–3	CA Pithiviers (6)
43.	Neuville Sports (9)	1–4	CSM Sully-sur-Loire (7)
44.	FC Étoile Verte (9)	1–2	Le Richelais (8)
45.	AS Ingrandes (11)	1–2	US Montbazon (11)
46.	US Yzeures-Preuilly (9)	5–1	US Argenton Le Pêchereau (8)
47.	ES Bourgueil (9)	2–2 (4–5 p)	Saint-Georges Descartes (8)
48.	AC Parnac Val d'Abloux (9)	0–1	US Le Blanc (8)
49.	US Villedieu-sur-Indre (10)	0–5	SC Azay-Cheillé (6)
50.	Entente Arpheuilles-Clion-Saulnay (10)	2–1	FC de la Marche Occitane (10)
51.	US Gâtines (10)	3–1	AS Les Bordes (11)
52.	FC Levroux (9)	0–0 (2–4 p)	Cher-Sologne Football (8)
53.	US Pouillé-Mareuil (11)	3–3 (4–3 p)	US Pruniers-en-Sologne (9)
54.	ES Villefranche-sur-Cher (10)	1–3	SC Massay (7)
55.	AS Chabris (10)	1–3	SC Vatan (8)
56.	US Reuilly (9)	0–3	Diables Rouges Selles-Saint-Denis (9)
57.	Saint-Roch City Romorantin (10)	0–0 (4–3 p)	AC Villers-les-Ormes (11)
58.	Bonny-Beaulieu FC (10)	2–1	US Henrichemont-Menetou-Salon (8)
59.	US Sainte-Solange (12)	2–1	CS Vignoux-sur-Barangeon (8)
60.	AS Salbris (10)	1–2	FC Fussy-Saint-Martin-Vigneux (8)
61.	AS Saint-Germain-du-Puy (8)	0–2	FC Saint-Doulchard (7)
62.	FC Verdigny Sancerre (9)	0–0 (5–4 p)	SL Chaillot Vierzon (9)
63.	Olympique Portugais Mehun-sur-Yèvre (9)	2–1	US Poilly-Autry (10)
64.	US Le Poinçonnet (8)	2–2 (4–2 p)	FC Diors (7)
65.	FC Saint-Denis-de-Jouhet/Sarzay (11)	0–1	US La Châtre (8)
66.	AS Jeu-les-Bois (11)	1–4	US Montgivray (8)
67.	SA Issoudun (9)	9–0	La Patriote Ambrault (10)
68.	AS Neuvy-Pailloux (10)	2–3	US Saint-Maur (8)
69.	FC Velles-Arthon-La Pérouille 36 (9)	2–0	US Aigurande (9)
70.	FC Avord (10)	0–3	AS Saint-Amandoise (6)
71.	ES Trouy (8)	1–1 (4–5 p)	AS Portugais Bourges (6)
72.	ES Justices Bourges (11)	1–3	Avenir Lignières (9)
73.	US Dun-sur-Auron (10)	1–0	ES Moulon Bourges (7)
74.	SC Châteauneuf-sur-Cher (9)	0–1	Gazélec Bourges (8)

=== Second round ===
These matches were played on 13 September 2020, with one replayed on 27 September 2020.

Second round results: Centre-Val de Loire
Tie no	Home team (tier)	Score	Away team (tier)
1.	CS Oucques (10)	1–4 (Note: Tie reversed from original draw.)	AS Tréon (12)
2.	CO Cherisy (10)	3–7	FC Saint-Georges-sur-Eure (6)
3.	Amicale Gallardon (10)	1–3	US Portugaise Joué-lès-Tours (7)
4.	CS Mainvilliers (7)	4–1	AS Tout Horizon Dreux (8)
5.	FC Mandorais (10)	1–3	Dammarie Foot Bois-Gueslin (8)
6.	CSM Sully-sur-Loire (7)	1–1 (2–4 p)	ES Maintenon-Pierres (8)
7.	US Vallée du Loir (9)	1–6	CA Pithiviers (6)
8.	Amicale de Lucé (8)	0–0 (4–3 p)	SC Malesherbes (9)
9.	FC Tremblay-les-Villages (9)	0–5	FC Drouais (6)
10.	OC Tours (10)	6–2	Langeais Cinq-Mars Foot (8)
11.	US Montbazon (11)	0–2	ES Vallée Verte (9)
12.	SC Azay-Cheillé (6)	1–4	US Chambray-lès-Tours (6)
13.	Racing La Riche-Tours (8)	1–8	ÉB Saint-Cyr-sur-Loire (6)
14.	Le Richelais (8)	0–2	US Yzeures-Preuilly (9)
15.	Saint-Georges Descartes (8)	2–1	US Monnaie (9)
16.	ASPO Tours (11)	6–0	Entente Arpheuilles-Clion-Saulnay (10)
17.	US Le Blanc (8)	0–2	Joué-lès-Tours FCT (7)
18.	FC Semoy (10)	2–2 (3–5 p)	USM Olivet (7)
19.	US Sainte-Solange (12)	1–3	FC Saint-Doulchard (7)
20.	ASC Portugais Blois (9)	0–2	SMOC Saint-Jean-de-Braye (8)
21.	FC Fussy-Saint-Martin-Vigneux (8)	1–3	Vineuil SF (6)
22.	US Renaudine (9)	0–4	ES Chaingy-Saint-Ay (7)
23.	US Chitenay-Cellettes (8)	2–1	Avenir Saint-Amand-Longpré (8)
24.	ES Marigny (9)	0–1	FC Verdigny Sancerre (9)
25.	Bonny-Beaulieu FC (10)	0–4	Olympique Portugais Mehun-sur-Yèvre (9)
26.	AS Nouan-Lamotte (9)	0–2	FCM Ingré (7)
27.	ASL Orchaise (9)	2–2 (5–4 p)	AS Contres (6)
28.	CS Lusitanos Beaugency (9)	2–6	ASJ La Chaussée-Saint-Victor (7)
29.	Cher-Sologne Football (8)	2–2 (3–2 p)	FC Velles-Arthon-La Pérouille 36 (9)
30.	US Gâtines (10)	0–4	AS Portugais Bourges (6)
31.	US Montgivray (8)	0–2	SC Vatan (8)
32.	Diables Rouges Selles-Saint-Denis (9)	3–2	US Saint-Maur (8)
33.	SC Massay (7)	0–0 (4–3 p)	US Le Poinçonnet (8)
34.	Avenir Lignières (9)	0–0 (4–5 p)	Saint-Roch City Romorantin (10)
35.	Gazélec Bourges (8)	0–1 (Note: Match originally finished 2–3. Gazélec Bourges filed a challenge over a refereeing decision, which was originally rejected by the rules committee. Gazélec Bourges appealed. The game was ordered to be replayed on 27 September 2020.)	SA Issoudun (9)
36.	US La Châtre (8)	1–3	AS Saint-Amandoise (6)
37.	US Pouillé-Mareuil (11)	2–1	US Dun-sur-Auron (10)

=== Third round ===
These matches were played on 19 and 20 September 2020, with one postponed until 30 September 2020 due to awaiting the outcome of the previous round.

Third round results: Centre-Val de Loire
Tie no	Home team (tier)	Score	Away team (tier)
1.	FC Drouais (6)	1–1 (5–4 p)	FC Ouest Tourangeau (5)
2.	Diables Rouges Selles-Saint-Denis (9)	1–5	AS Portugais Bourges (6)
3.	SC Vatan (8)	1–6	US Châteauneuf-sur-Loire (5)
4.	ASJ La Chaussée-Saint-Victor (7)	0–3	Vierzon FC (5)
5.	ASL Orchaise (9)	2–0	FC Saint-Doulchard (7)
6.	Saint-Roch City Romorantin (10)	1–3	AS Saint-Amandoise (6)
7.	SA Issoudun (9)	3–0	Vineuil SF (6)
8.	US Yzeures-Preuilly (9)	2–1	Cher-Sologne Football (8)
9.	ASPO Tours (11)	1–1 (4–2 p)	Joué-lès-Tours FCT (7)
10.	FC Verdigny Sancerre (9)	0–8	FC Montlouis (5)
11.	FC Saint-Jean-le-Blanc (5)	0–1	FC Déolois (5)
12.	US Pouillé-Mareuil (11)	1–11	SC Massay (7)
13.	OC Tours (10)	0–3 (Note: Tie won by means of forfeit.)	USM Montargis (5)
14.	AS Tréon (12)	1–1 (1–3 p)	SMOC Saint-Jean-de-Braye (8)
15.	CA Pithiviers (6)	0–2	ES Chaingy-Saint-Ay (7)
16.	Amicale de Lucé (8)	0–2	J3S Amilly (5)
17.	ES Vallée Verte (9)	1–0	US Chitenay-Cellettes (8)
18.	Dammarie Foot Bois-Gueslin (8)	3–1	Saint-Georges Descartes (8)
19.	USM Olivet (7)	0–15	Avoine OCC (5)
20.	US Chambray-lès-Tours (6)	5–1	FCM Ingré (7)
21.	US Portugaise Joué-lès-Tours (7)	2–4	CS Mainvilliers (7)
22.	ÉB Saint-Cyr-sur-Loire (6)	1–0	USM Saran (5)
23.	ES Maintenon-Pierres (8)	0–2	FC Saint-Georges-sur-Eure (6)
24.	Olympique Portugais Mehun-sur-Yèvre (9)	1–5	Tours FC (5)

=== Fourth round ===
These matches were played on 3 and 4 October 2020.

Fourth round results: Centre-Val de Loire
Tie no	Home team (tier)	Score	Away team (tier)
1.	FC Saint-Georges-sur-Eure (6)	0–3	Saint-Pryvé Saint-Hilaire FC (4)
2.	Blois Football 41 (4)	0–1	J3S Amilly (5)
3.	Dammarie Foot Bois-Gueslin (8)	1–3	FC Drouais (6)
4.	US Chambray-lès-Tours (6)	0–1	USM Montargis (5)
5.	ES Chaingy-Saint-Ay (7)	0–6	Avoine OCC (5)
6.	C'Chartres Football (4)	2–2 (4–5 p)	FC Montlouis (5)
7.	SMOC Saint-Jean-de-Braye (8)	1–1 (4–2 p)	ÉB Saint-Cyr-sur-Loire (6)
8.	ES Vallée Verte (9)	0–1	CS Mainvilliers (7)
9.	US Yzeures-Preuilly (9)	2–2 (4–5 p)	Bourges Foot (4)
10.	SA Issoudun (9)	0–1	SO Romorantin (4)
11.	ASL Orchaise (9)	0–3	Tours FC (5)
12.	Vierzon FC (5)	1–0	US Châteauneuf-sur-Loire (5)
13.	SC Massay (7)	0–9	Bourges 18 (4)
14.	ASPO Tours (11)	1–1 (4–5 p)	AS Saint-Amandoise (6)
15.	AS Portugais Bourges (6)	1–3	FC Déolois (5)

=== Fifth round ===
These matches were played on 17 and 18 October 2020, with one postponed until 28 October 2020.

Fifth round results: Centre-Val de Loire
Tie no	Home team (tier)	Score	Away team (tier)
1.	CS Mainvilliers (7)	0–1	Tours FC (5)
2.	FC Drouais (6)	0–2	SO Romorantin (4)
3.	FC Montlouis (5)	0–0 (3–4 p)	US Orléans (3)
4.	Bourges Foot (4)	2–0	Saint-Pryvé Saint-Hilaire FC (4)
5.	FC Déolois (5)	1–1 (3–4 p)	USM Montargis (5)
6.	Vierzon FC (5)	0–0 (4–3 p) (Note: Tie reversed from original draw.)	Avoine OCC (5)
7.	SMOC Saint-Jean-de-Braye (8)	3–3 (5–4 p)	J3S Amilly (5)
8.	AS Saint-Amandoise (6)	0–2	Bourges 18 (4)

=== Sixth round ===
These matches were played on 31 January 2021.

Sixth round results: Centre-Val de Loire
Tie no	Home team (tier)	Score	Away team (tier)
1.	Vierzon FC (5)	1–2	US Orléans (3)
2.	Bourges 18 (4)	3–2	Bourges Foot (4)
3.	SO Romorantin (4)	3–1	USM Montargis (5)
4.	SMOC Saint-Jean-de-Braye (8)	1–2	Tours FC (5)
