= 2015–16 Championnat de France Amateur =

Championnat de France Amateur
- Season: 2015–16
- Champions: Lyon-Duchère
- Promoted: Lyon-Duchère; Pau; Concarneau; Quevilly
- Relegated: (11 teams - see "Season outcomes" section)
- Top goalscorer: Damien Mayenga, Roye Noyon (18 goals)
- Biggest home win: 6–0 (Troyes (res) v L'Entente SSG, Round 8, 17 October 2015; Cholet v Fleury-Mérogis, Round 27, 7 May 2016)
- Biggest away win: 1–6 (Roye Noyon v Poissy, Round 3, 29 August 2015)
- Highest scoring: 8 goals (Stade Plabennécois v Lorient (res), Round 8, 17 October 2015; Sochaux (res) v Montceau, Round 11, 5 December 2015; Saint-Malo v Lorient (res), Round 30, 4 June 2016)

The 2015–16 Championnat de France Amateur is the 18th season of the fourth tier in the French football league system.

== Teams ==
There were twelve teams promoted from Championnat de France amateur 2, while ten teams were relegated from the 2014–15 Championnat de France amateur. Two teams came from the 2014–15 Ligue 2 and 2014–15 Championnat National, which are AC Arles-Avignon and US Colomiers Football respectively. The original plan was to have CA Bastia, FC Istres and SAS Épinal also relegated from the Championnat National, but due to DNCG and/or FFF rulings, the following clubs were relegated to lower divisions: AC Arles-Avignon (demoted from Ligue 2), Vendée Poiré-sur-Vie Football (resigned to join CFA 2) and FC Istres (demoted to 6th level). Bastia and Épinal stayed in Championnat National.

Because of these vacancies, Hyères FC and Vendée Fontenay Foot remained in the CFA. Arles-Avignon was declared bankrupt in the middle of the season and subsequently relegated to the Mediterranean second tier or 7th tier overall. All results were invalidated and remaining games cancelled.

== League tables ==
Group A
| Pos | Team | Pld | W | D | L | GF | GA | GD | Pts | Promotion or relegation |
|---|---|---|---|---|---|---|---|---|---|---|
| 1 | Quevilly-Rouen (C) | 30 | 17 | 11 | 2 | 50 | 22 | +28 | 92 | Promotion to National |
| 2 | IC Croix | 30 | 15 | 10 | 5 | 55 | 37 | +18 | 85 | |
| 3 | Poissy | 30 | 15 | 7 | 8 | 55 | 42 | +13 | 82 | |
| 4 | L'Entente SSG | 30 | 12 | 10 | 8 | 46 | 39 | +7 | 76 | |
| 5 | Arras FA | 30 | 11 | 8 | 11 | 43 | 43 | 0 | 71 | |
| 6 | AC Amiens | 30 | 12 | 4 | 14 | 35 | 34 | +1 | 70 | |
| 7 | Paris Saint-Germain (res) | 30 | 11 | 7 | 12 | 35 | 40 | −5 | 70 | |
| 8 | Mantes | 30 | 11 | 6 | 13 | 31 | 38 | −7 | 69 | |
| 9 | Calais RUFC | 30 | 10 | 8 | 12 | 32 | 37 | −5 | 68 | |
| 10 | Boulogne-Billancourt | 30 | 10 | 8 | 12 | 43 | 40 | +3 | 68 | |
| 11 | Dieppe | 30 | 9 | 10 | 11 | 31 | 24 | +7 | 67 | |
| 12 | Wasquehal (Note: On 5 January 2016, Wasquehal were handed an administrative demotion to CFA 2 for financial issues. On appeal, this was reduced to a deduction of 10 points on 25 May 2016.) | 30 | 12 | 10 | 8 | 44 | 41 | +3 | 66 | |
| 13 | Lens (res) | 30 | 9 | 9 | 12 | 37 | 45 | −8 | 66 | |
| 14 | Troyes (res) (Note: Troyes reserves were penalised for fielding a suspended player in the game against Wasquehal on 12 March 2016. The match finished 4–0 to Wasquehal. The scoreline stood, but Troyes reserves had the 1 point for defeat withheld.) (R) | 30 | 9 | 9 | 12 | 41 | 47 | −6 | 65 | Relegation to CFA 2 |
| 15 | Aubervilliers (R) | 30 | 4 | 12 | 14 | 27 | 47 | −20 | 54 | Relegation to CFA 2 |
| 16 | Roye Noyon (Note: Roye Noyon were penalised when the game against Troyes reserves on 12 September 2015 was forced to be abandoned with Roye reduced to 7 men, due to three players being sent off and two players injured after all three substitutions had been made. The score at the time of abandonment was 3-0 to Troyes reserves. This scoreline stood, but Roye Noyon had the 1 point for defeat withheld.) (R) | 30 | 5 | 7 | 18 | 38 | 67 | −29 | 51 | Relegation to CFA 2 |

Source: FFF.fr
Rules for classification: 1) points; 2) head-to-head results; 3) head-to-head goal difference; 4) goal difference; 5) number of goals scored; 6) fair play points; 7) draw
(C) Champions; (R) Relegated
Notes:

Group B
| Pos | Team | Pld | W | D | L | GF | GA | GD | Pts | Promotion or relegation |
|---|---|---|---|---|---|---|---|---|---|---|
| 1 | Lyon-Duchère (C) | 30 | 18 | 8 | 4 | 44 | 19 | +25 | 92 | Promotion to National |
| 2 | Grenoble | 30 | 17 | 8 | 5 | 40 | 19 | +21 | 89 | |
| 3 | Auxerre (res) | 30 | 14 | 7 | 9 | 39 | 27 | +12 | 79 | |
| 4 | Lyon (res) | 30 | 14 | 5 | 11 | 39 | 41 | −2 | 77 | |
| 5 | Villefranche | 30 | 11 | 10 | 9 | 37 | 30 | +7 | 73 | |
| 6 | Jura Sud (Note: Jura Sud were penalised for fielding a suspended player in the match against Villefranche on 2 April 2016. The original scoreline was 1–0 in favour of Jura Sud. The match was awarded as a 3–0 victory to Villefranche, and the point due to Jura Sud in defeat was withheld) | 30 | 11 | 11 | 8 | 41 | 34 | +7 | 73 | |
| 7 | Drancy | 30 | 10 | 11 | 9 | 33 | 29 | +4 | 71 | |
| 8 | St-Louis Neuweg | 30 | 11 | 7 | 12 | 30 | 30 | 0 | 70 | |
| 9 | Monts d'Or | 30 | 8 | 14 | 8 | 26 | 32 | −6 | 68 | |
| 10 | Mulhouse | 30 | 10 | 7 | 13 | 33 | 36 | −3 | 67 | |
| 11 | Yzeure | 30 | 8 | 12 | 10 | 27 | 29 | −2 | 66 | |
| 12 | Le Puy Foot | 30 | 8 | 8 | 14 | 27 | 35 | −8 | 62 | |
| 13 | Montceau | 30 | 8 | 8 | 14 | 28 | 50 | −22 | 62 | |
| 14 | Sarre-Union (R) | 30 | 6 | 10 | 14 | 34 | 41 | −7 | 58 | Relegation to CFA 2 |
| 15 | Sochaux (res) (R) | 30 | 5 | 9 | 16 | 23 | 42 | −19 | 54 | Relegation to CFA 2 |
| 16 | Moulins (Note: Moulins forfeited the game against St-Louis Neuweg on 28 May 2016, when their players refused to play after the club's board declined to take forward a merger with Yzeure for the following season. Moulins also did not present for the game against Sarre-Union, the final game of the season, on 4 June 2016. They are to file for bankruptcy and be administratively relegated at the end of the season, and are therefore placed at the bottom of the table by the FFF.) (X) | 30 | 9 | 9 | 12 | 34 | 41 | −7 | 0 | Relegated and points expunged in June 2016, see notes. |

Updated to match(es) played on 4 June 2016. Source: FFF.fr
Rules for classification: 1) points; 2) head-to-head results; 3) head-to-head goal difference; 4) goal difference; 5) number of goals scored; 6) fair play points; 7) draw
(C) Champions; (R) Relegated; (X) Relegated and points expunged
Notes:

Group C
| Pos | Team | Pld | W | D | L | GF | GA | GD | Pts | Promotion or relegation |
|---|---|---|---|---|---|---|---|---|---|---|
| 1 | Pau (C) | 28 | 17 | 7 | 4 | 38 | 19 | +19 | 86 | Promotion to National |
| 2 | Colomiers | 28 | 14 | 6 | 8 | 32 | 27 | +5 | 76 | |
| 3 | Monaco (res) (Note: Monaco reserves were penalised for fielding an ineligible player in the game against Sète on 9 January 2016. The game finished 3-3, but Sète were awarded a 3–0 victory, and Monaco reserves had the point due for defeat withheld.) | 28 | 14 | 5 | 9 | 52 | 35 | +17 | 74 | |
| 4 | Nice (res) | 28 | 13 | 6 | 9 | 42 | 36 | +6 | 73 | |
| 5 | Stade Montois | 28 | 12 | 7 | 9 | 33 | 30 | +3 | 71 | |
| 6 | Marignane | 28 | 10 | 7 | 11 | 32 | 39 | −7 | 65 | |
| 7 | Martigues | 28 | 9 | 10 | 9 | 25 | 29 | −4 | 65 | |
| 8 | Hyères | 28 | 9 | 9 | 10 | 32 | 29 | +3 | 64 | |
| 9 | Marseille (res) | 28 | 7 | 13 | 8 | 33 | 33 | 0 | 62 | |
| 10 | Tarbes | 28 | 9 | 7 | 12 | 28 | 36 | −8 | 62 | |
| 11 | Toulon-Le Las | 28 | 7 | 13 | 8 | 27 | 34 | −7 | 62 | |
| 12 | Le Pontet | 28 | 9 | 7 | 12 | 38 | 40 | −2 | 62 | |
| 13 | Sète | 28 | 7 | 11 | 10 | 23 | 26 | −3 | 60 | |
| 14 | Rodez | 28 | 8 | 7 | 13 | 25 | 27 | −2 | 59 | |
| 15 | Bayonne (R) | 28 | 5 | 5 | 18 | 23 | 43 | −20 | 48 | Relegation to CFA 2 |
| 16 | Arles (Note: Arles were dissolved during the season, and their record thus expunged.) (D) | 0 | 0 | 0 | 0 | 0 | 0 | 0 | 0 | Club dissolved |

Source: FFF.fr
Rules for classification: 1) points; 2) head-to-head results; 3) head-to-head goal difference; 4) goal difference; 5) number of goals scored; 6) fair play points; 7) draw
(C) Champions; (D) Record expunged due to dissolution.; (R) Relegated
Notes:

Group D
| Pos | Team | Pld | W | D | L | GF | GA | GD | Pts | Promotion or relegation |
|---|---|---|---|---|---|---|---|---|---|---|
| 1 | Concarneau (C) | 30 | 15 | 11 | 4 | 41 | 24 | +17 | 86 | Promotion to National |
| 2 | Saint-Malo | 30 | 16 | 7 | 7 | 57 | 32 | +25 | 85 | |
| 3 | Romorantin | 30 | 16 | 6 | 8 | 54 | 44 | +10 | 84 | |
| 4 | Bergerac | 30 | 15 | 7 | 8 | 36 | 33 | +3 | 82 | |
| 5 | Cholet | 30 | 12 | 8 | 10 | 36 | 28 | +8 | 74 | |
| 6 | Lorient (res) | 30 | 11 | 11 | 8 | 40 | 31 | +9 | 74 | |
| 7 | Châteaubriant | 30 | 11 | 10 | 9 | 46 | 41 | +5 | 73 | |
| 8 | Fleury-Mérogis | 30 | 9 | 14 | 7 | 32 | 35 | −3 | 71 | |
| 9 | Trélissac | 30 | 9 | 12 | 9 | 38 | 32 | +6 | 69 | |
| 10 | Vendée Fontenay | 30 | 7 | 14 | 9 | 40 | 45 | −5 | 65 | |
| 11 | Nantes (res) | 30 | 9 | 8 | 13 | 37 | 38 | −1 | 65 | |
| 12 | Stade Plabennécois | 30 | 8 | 10 | 12 | 34 | 49 | −15 | 64 | |
| 13 | Viry | 30 | 6 | 13 | 11 | 26 | 34 | −8 | 61 | |
| 14 | Vitré | 30 | 7 | 9 | 14 | 33 | 46 | −13 | 60 | |
| 15 | Stade Bordelais (R) | 30 | 5 | 10 | 15 | 22 | 37 | −15 | 55 | Relegation to CFA 2 |
| 16 | Bordeaux (res) (R) | 30 | 4 | 10 | 16 | 23 | 46 | −23 | 52 | Relegation to CFA 2 |

Source: FFF.fr
Rules for classification: 1) points; 2) head-to-head results; 3) head-to-head goal difference; 4) goal difference; 5) number of goals scored; 6) fair play points; 7) draw
(C) Champions; (R) Relegated

== Season outcomes ==
Outcomes below are provisional and subject to ratification by the FFF.

=== Champions and promotion ===
Lyon-Duchère, Pau, Concarneau and Quevilly-Rouen are promoted to National.

Lyon-Duchère are Champions of 2015–16 Championnat de France amateur, due to having the best record of the four promoted sides against the teams finishing in 2nd to 6th in their respective groups.

=== Relegation ===
Troyes (res), Aubervilliers, Roye Noyon, Sochaux (res) , Sarre-Union, Moulins, (Note: Montceau originally finished in the relegation places, but Moulins were placed 16th in the Group B table by the FFF due to filing for bankruptcy, meaning Montceau were elevated to 13th) Bayonne, Rodez, Bordeaux (res), Stade Bordelais and Vitré were provisionally relegated to CFA2, subject to reprieves.

=== Reprieves ===
On 8 June, the FFF confirmed that Luçon would be administratively relegated from 2015–16 Championnat National to the regional Division d'Honneur. This results in a reprieve for Rodez.

On 31 May, the FFF confirmed that Colmar would be administratively relegated, in addition to their sporting relegation from 2015–16 Championnat National, resulting in Vitré being reprieved. Colmar subsequently filed for bankruptcy, and will reform in the regional Division d'Honneur.

If any further administrative events lead to teams from outside the relegation places being relegated, already relegated teams will be reprieved in the following order:

==== Best 14th placed teams ====
Based on record against the teams finishing in 9th to 13th place in their respective groups.

| Pos | Team | Pld | Pts | GD | |
|---|---|---|---|---|---|
| 1 | Rodez | 10 | 25 | 2 | Reprieved |
| 2 | Vitré | 10 | 25 | -2 | Reprieved |
| 3 | Sarre-Union | 10 | 23 | 3 | |
| 4 | Troyes (res) | 10 | 21 | -6 | |

==== Best 15th placed teams ====
Based on record against the teams finishing in 10th to 14th place in their respective groups

| Pos | Team | Pld | Pts | GD |
|---|---|---|---|---|
| 1 | Stade Bordelais | 10 | 21 | -6 |
| 2 | Sochaux (res) | 10 | 20 | -1 |
| 3 | Bayonne | 10 | 19 | -6 |
| 4 | Aubervilliers | 10 | 17 | -9 |

== Top scorers ==
As of end of season

| Rank | Player | Club | Goals |
|---|---|---|---|
| 1 | Damien Mayenga | Roye Noyon | 19 |
| 1 | Ilyes Chaïbi | Monaco (res) | 19 |
| 3 | Abou Maiga | Saint-Malo | 18 |
| 3 | Yannick Mamilonne | Poissy | 18 |
| 5 | Tony Do Pilar Patrao | Jura Sud | 17 |
| 6 | Mehdy Guezoui | Quevilly-Rouen | 16 |
| 6 | Malik Rouag | Poissy | 16 |
| 6 | Rémi Laurent | Vitré | 16 |
| 9 | Patrick Etshini Kindenge | L'Entente SSG | 15 |
| 10 | Jeremy Bekhechi | IC Croix | 13 |
| 10 | Rémi Souyeux | Romorantin | 13 |
