= Jordan Fauqué =

French footballer (born 1991)

Personal information
- Date of birth: 26 August 1991 (age 35)
- Place of birth: Arles, France
- Height: 1.73 m (5 ft 8 in)
- Position: Defender

Team information
- Current team: Déols

Youth career
- 2006–2008: Toulouse
- 2008–2009: JS Cugnaux

Senior career*
Years	Team	Apps	(Gls)
2009–2013	Châteauroux	39	(0)
2013–2014	Déols		
2014–2015	Rodez	16	(1)
2015–2020	Balma	51	(1)
2020–	Déols	12+	(0+)
- * Club domestic league appearances and goals as of 20:00, 11 March 2022 (UTC)

Jordan Fauqué (born 26 August 1991) is a French professional footballer who plays as a defender for Championnat National 3 club Déols.
