= Geoffrey Adjet =

French footballer (born 1988)

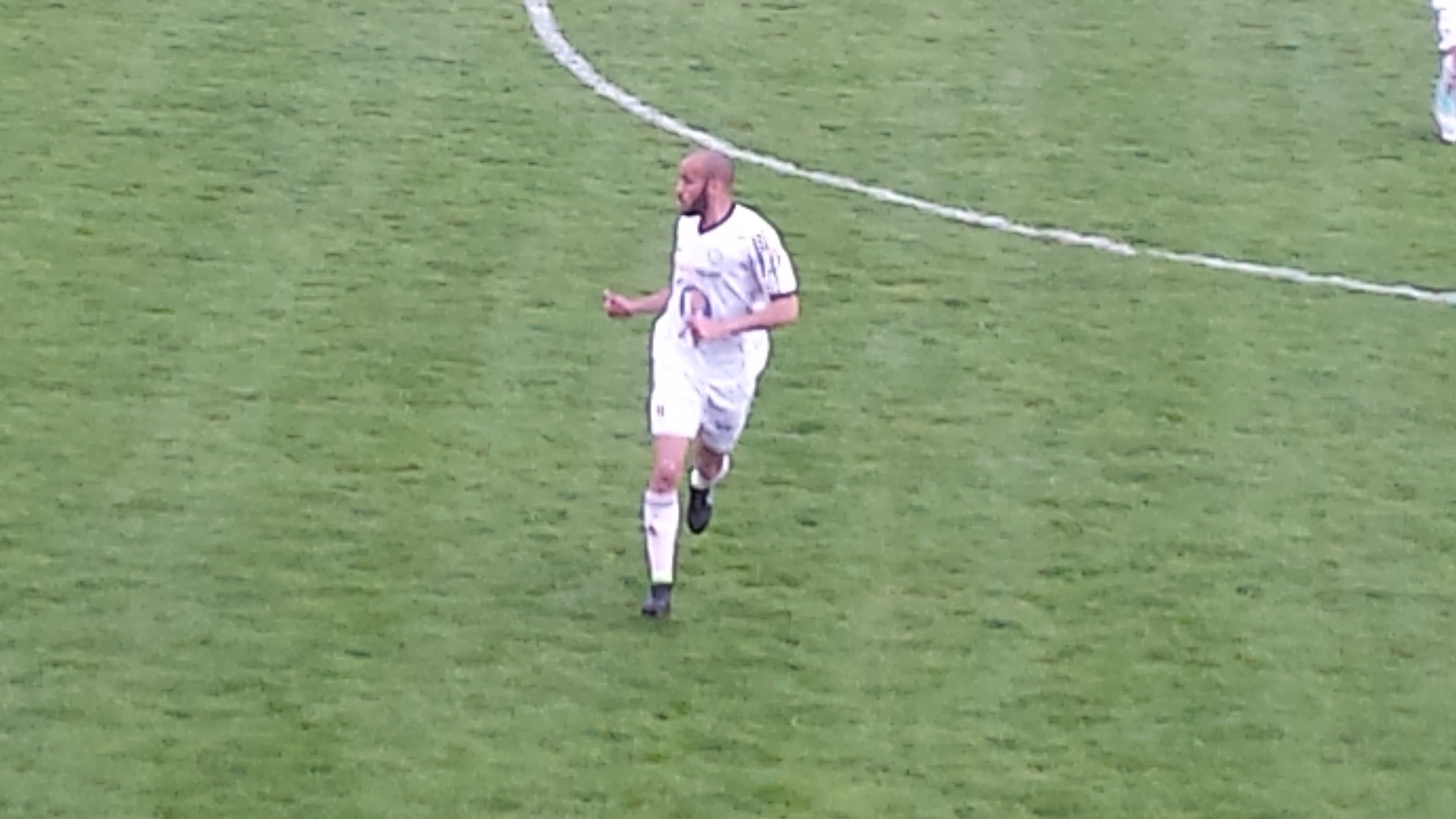
- Adjet playing for Romorantin in 2015

Personal information
- Full name: Geoffrey Adjet
- Date of birth: 15 April 1988 (age 38)
- Place of birth: Toulouse, France
- Height: 6 ft 0 in (1.82 m)
- Positions: Midfielder; left-back

Youth career
- 2001–2005: Toulouse Fontaines
- 2005–2006: Toulouse

Senior career*
Years	Team	Apps	(Gls)
2006–2007	Toulouse	0	(0)
2007	→Blagnac (loan)	10	(0)
2007–2008	Toulouse Fontaines	1	(0)
2008–2009	Nancy	6	(1)
2009–2011	Tours	21	(1)
2013–2014	Toulouse Fontaines	7	(1)
2014–2019	Romorantin	124	(12)
2021–2024	Romorantin	76	(8)
Total		245	(23)
- * Club domestic league appearances and goals as of 02:54, 11 June 2024 (UTC)

Geoffrey Adjet (born 15 April 1988) is a French former footballer who played as a midfielder and left-back.

== Career ==
=== Early career ===
Adjet started his youth career with hometown side Toulouse Fontaines, with their academy competing at national level during this time.

Adjet was spotted by Ligue 1 club Toulouse FC when playing against them twice at under-17 level. As a result, he was invited to train with them, subsequently signing shortly after.

Failing to break through to the first team, Adjet was allowed to join city counterparts Blagnac FC on loan in January 2007 after being approached by an acquaintance in his hometown. Blagnac competed in the fifth-tier, known as the Championnat de France Amateur 2 (CFA 2) at the time, this being equivalent to a Championnat National 3 division in today's format. Adjet was initially involved with the first-team, before spending time with the youth set-up.

Adjet returned to Toulouse Fontaines ahead of the 2007–08 season, after again being approached by an acquaintance in his hometown. The move was appealing to Adjet due to increased investment in the club at the time. Fontaines competed in the same CFA 2 division (Group E) as Blagnac at this time. During this period Adjet mainly represented the youth team, however he did make a solitary league appearance for the first team.

Adjet's talent was spotted by former Nancy player and coach Christophe Bastien whilst training with the first team at Toulouse Fontaines. Bastien went onto recommended Adjet to his former club, who subsequently invited him for a trial.

=== Nancy ===
Following Bastien's recommendation and a successful trial period, Adjet signed for Ligue 1 side Nancy on 15 August 2008.

Nancy had finished in 4th place in the 2007–08 Ligue 1 season, giving Adjet the opportunity to be part of a squad competing in the 2008–09 UEFA Cup.

Adjet made his Ligue 1 debut on 21 February 2009 as a 67th-minute substitute against Lyon. Future Ballon d'Or winner Karim Benzema was introduced for Lyon a minute prior to Adjet. Benzema went onto score as Nancy were defeated 2–0.

On 18 April 2009, Adjet scored a decisive goal in the 85th minute against Caen, with his team going onto the win 2–1.

Adjet made six substitute appearances for the club, all in Ligue 1.

Adjet left Nancy in the summer of 2009, upon the expiration of his contract.

=== Tours ===
On 1 July 2009, Adjet signed for Ligue 2 side Tours. Here he would share the dressing room with future 2018 FIFA World Cup winner and France national team record goalscorer Olivier Giroud.

On 18 January 2010, Adjet made his full professional league debut, starting and playing 79 minutes of a 1–1 draw against Le Havre.

On 23 January 2010, Adjet scored the opening goal in a 4–0 defeat of FC Istres.

Adjet's time at Tours was blighted by injury, seeing him leave the club after a two-year spell.

=== Career break ===
Following his release from Tours, Adjet struggled to find a professional club.

He attended initiatives organised by the National Union of Professional Footballers (UNFP) in the summer of 2011. This allowed him to train and play competitive games, in a bid to stay fit and find a club.

On 29 June 2011, Adjet scored for a team fielded by the UNFP made up of players trying to find a club. His team defeated an RC Lens XI 0–1.

=== Toulouse Fontaines ===
On 17 October 2013, Adjet returned to Toulouse Fontaines after two years without a club.

Fontaines had been relegated to the sixth-tier in 2011 and were now competing in the Division d'Honneur (DH), this being equivalent to a Régional 1 division in today's format.

Adjet admitted this spell at the club was poor in a sporting sense as previous investment had been pulled out of the club, and they were now struggling financially.

However, the move allowed Adjet to re-adjust to competitive football, making a return to a higher division possible.

=== SO Romorantin ===
In July 2014, Adjet signed for fourth-tier side SO Romorantin in the Championnat de France Amateur (CFA) which would later become the Championnat National 2, ahead of the 2017–18 season.

On 11 November 2016, Adjet scored his only ever goal in the Coupe de France, the opener against Blois Football 41 in a 2–3 defeat.

On 10 November 2018, Adjet made a half-time substitute appearance against Trélissac-Antonne Périgord FC, eventually going onto score a ninety-third-minute equaliser after his team went behind late-on.

Adjet remained part of SO Romorantin's squad for five successive seasons.

On 25 May 2019, Adjet sustained an injury to his knee cartilage against US Colomiers in his team's final game of the 2018–19 Championnat National 2 Group B calendar. This injury forced him to be substituted in the forty-second minute and put Adjet's future playing career in real doubt.

=== Career break, injury ===
Adjet completed his rehabilitation from injury throughout the COVID-19 pandemic. He admits this spell was challenging and he even contemplated retirement.

=== SO Romorantin return ===
Following successfully rehabilitation from injury, Adjet continued to represent SO Romorantin.

On 28 October 2023, Adjet played against his former club Tours in the second-round of the 2023–24 Coupe de France. Adjet provided an assist for the equalising goal as his team came from behind to advance to the third-round with a 2–1 win. SO Romorantin were eventually eliminated at the sixth-round stage.

At the end of the 2023–24 season, Adjet had represented SO Romorantin 200 times in the league and 6 times in the Coupe de France, scoring 21 goals.

== Style of play ==
Adjet was a naturally left-footed footballer and spent his developing years as an “attacking midfielder on the left-side”.

Throughout his career Adjet was versatile, playing a range of positions. He admits his best years came on the left-side when he was “in better physical shape”, prior to serious injury struggles. He was mainly deployed as a left-midfielder during his time at Nancy and Tours, whilst also providing cover at full-back.

In his later career for Romorantin, Adjet often played in a more central midfield position, going on record to say this allowed him to see more of the ball and provide chances for teammates.

== Personal life ==
Geoffrey Adjet grew up in the city of Toulouse and is of Ivorian descent.

== Career statistics ==
As of the match played 18 May 2024

Appearances and goals by club, season and competition
Club	Season	League			Coupe de France		Coupe de la Ligue		UEFA Cup		Total	
Club	Season	Division	Apps	Goals	Apps	Goals	Apps	Goals	Apps	Goals	Apps	Goals
Toulouse	2006–2007	Ligue 1	0	0	0	0	0	0	-	-	0	0
Blagnac (loan)	2007	Championnat de France Amateur 2 (CFA 2) (Group E)	10	0	0	0	-	-	-	-	10	0
Toulouse Fontaines	2007–2008	Championnat de France Amateur 2 (CFA 2) (Group E)	1	0	0	0	-	-	-	-	1	0
Nancy	2008–2009	Ligue 1	6	1	0	0	0	0	0	0	6	1
Tours	2009–2010	Ligue 2	8	1	0	0	0	0	-	-	8	1
Tours	2010–2011	Ligue 2	13	0	0	0	0	0	-	-	13	0
Tours	Total		21	1	0	0	0	0	-	-	21	1
Toulouse Fontaines	2013–2014	Division d'Honneur (DH)(Midi-Pyrénées)	7	1	0	0	-	-	-	-	7	1
Romorantin	2014–2015	Championnat de France Amateur (CFA)(Group A)	23	1	0	0	-	-	-	-	23	1
Romorantin	2015–2016	Championnat de France Amateur (CFA)(Group D)	26	4	0	0	-	-	-	-	26	4
Romorantin	2016–2017	Championnat de France Amateur (CFA)(Group A)	20	2	1	1	-	-	-	-	21	3
Romorantin	2017–2018	Championnat National 2 (Group D)	27	4	2	0	-	-	-	-	29	4
Romorantin	2018–2019	Championnat National 2 (Group B)	28	1	0	0	-	-	-	-	28	1
Romorantin	Total		124	12	3	1	-	-	-	-	127	13
Romorantin	2021–2022	Championnat National 2 (Group A)	27	2	0	0	-	-	-	-	27	2
Romorantin	2022–2023	Championnat National 2 (Group D)	27	4	0	0	-	-	-	-	27	4
Romorantin	2023–2024	Championnat National 2 (Group B)	22	2	3	0	-	-	-	-	25	2
Romorantin	Total		76	8	3	0	-	-	-	-	79	8
Career total			245	23	6	1	0	0	0	0	251	24
