= Ludovic Lidon =

French footballer (born 1971)

Personal information
- Full name: Ludovic Lidon
- Date of birth: February 6, 1971 (age 55)
- Place of birth: Tours, France
- Height: 1.82 m (5 ft 11 1/2 in)
- Position: Defender

Senior career*
Years	Team	Apps	(Gls)
1988–1991	Chamois Niortais	1	(0)
1991–2005	Romorantin	251	(24)

Managerial career
- Romorantin
- * Club domestic league appearances and goals

Ludovic Lidon (born February 6, 1971) is a former professional footballer who played as a central defender.
