= 2019–20 Coupe de France preliminary rounds =

2019–20 Coupe de France
Coupe Charles Simon

Tournament details
- Country: France

The 2019–20 Coupe de France preliminary rounds made up the qualifying competition to decide which teams took part in the main competition from round 7. This is the 103rd season of the main football cup competition of France. The competition is organised by the French Football Federation (FFF) and is open to all clubs in French football, as well as clubs from the overseas departments and territories (Guadeloupe, French Guiana, Martinique, Mayotte, New Caledonia (qualification via 2019 New Caledonia Cup), Tahiti (qualification via 2018–19 Tahiti Cup), Réunion, Saint Martin and Saint Pierre and Miquelon). A total of 156 teams qualified for round 7 from this process.

The six (or more, if required) Preliminary rounds were organised by the 13 Regional leagues from the mainland, and the 6 Regional leagues of the overseas departments and territories. They took place between February and October 2019.

== Schedule ==
Other than the overseas leagues, and those regional leagues which choose to have the early rounds before the summer break, the general schedule for the preliminary rounds was as follows:

Round	Date
First round	13 August 2019
Second round	27 August 2019
Third round	15 September 2019
Fourth round	29 September 2019
Fifth round	13 October 2019
Sixth round	27 October 2019

== Leagues ==
The details of the qualifying rounds for each league is separated out to individual articles, to avoid this article being too lengthy.

=== Overseas leagues ===
A total of eleven clubs qualified from the overseas leagues, two each from Guadeloupe, French Guiana, Martinique and Réunion, one each from Mayotte, New Caledonia and Tahiti. In 2018–19, Aiglon du Lamentin from Martinique were the longest surviving in the main competition, reaching the round of 64 before losing to Orléans after extra time.

==== Mayotte ====
The first-round draw was originally made on 14 February 2019, with a total of 48 clubs participating from Régionale 1, Régionale 2 and Régionale 3 divisions. This draw was subsequently cancelled, and replaced on 20 February 2019 with an expanded draw involving 65 clubs, including teams from Régionale 4. To achieve this, a Preliminary round with one match was required.

The second-round draw was published on 19 April 2019, with 16 ties being drawn.

The third-round draw was published on 4 June 2019, with 8 ties being drawn.

The fourth-round draw was published on 16 July 2019, with 4 ties being drawn.

The fifth-round draw was published on 16 August 2019, with 2 ties being drawn.

The details of the sixth-round match were published on 8 October 2019.

This match was played on 12 October 2019.

Sixth round results: Mayotte
Tie no	Home team (tier)	Score	Away team (tier)
1.	(Mayotte) FC Mtsapéré (R1)	5–1	Olympique de Miréréni (R1) (Mayotte)

Note: Mayotte League structure (no promotion to French League structure):
Régionale 1 (R1)
Régionale 2 (R2)
Régionale 3 (R3)
Régionale 4 (R4)

FC Mtsapéré qualified for the seventh round.

==== Réunion ====
A total of 48 teams from Régionale 1 and Régionale 2 divisions entered the competition, which started with a Preliminary round, analogous to the second round in the overall Preliminary round structure, on the weekend of 20 and 21 April 2019. 20 of the 28 Régionale 2 clubs entered at this stage, with the remaining 8 and the 14 Régionale 1 clubs being exempt to the round of 16, analogous to the third round.

Rounds three to six were straight knockouts, each drawn in two groups, to produce one winning team who would play in the seventh round at home and one winning team who would travel to France.

These matches were played on 27 October 2019.

Sixth round results: Réunion
Tie no	Home team (tier)	Score	Away team (tier)
1.	(Réunion) JS Saint-Pierroise (R1)	4–1	AF Saint-Louisien (R1) (Réunion)
2.	(Réunion) US Sainte-Marienne (R1)	1–0	AS Capricorne (R1) (Réunion)

Note: Reúnion League structure (no promotion to French League structure):
Régionale 1 (R1)
Régionale 2 (R2)
Départementale 1 (D1)

JS Saint-Pierroise and US Sainte-Marienne qualified for the seventh round.

==== French Guiana ====
The initial draw was made on 8 July 2019, with a total of 32 teams competing from Régionale 1 and Régionale 2 divisions.

The draw for the fourth round was published on 16 September 2019. Eight ties were drawn.

The draw for the fifth round was published on 30 September 2019. Four ties were drawn.

The draw for the sixth round was published on 16 October 2019. The two final ties were drawn, the winners of which qualify for the seventh round.

These matches were played on 25 and 26 October 2019.

Sixth round results: French Guiana
Tie no	Home team (tier)	Score	Away team (tier)
1.	(French Guiana) ASE Matoury (R1)	0–0 (2–4 p)	AJ Saint-Georges (R1) (French Guiana)
2.	(French Guiana) CSC Cayenne (R1)	1–1 (4–2 p)	ASC Kawina (none) (French Guiana)

Note: French Guiana League structure (no promotion to French League structure):
Régional 1 (R1)
Régional 2 (R2)

==== Martinique ====
A total of 52 teams from the three Régionale divisions entered the competition. Twelve teams (eleven from Régionale 1 and one from Régionale 2) were awarded a bye in the opening round, leaving 20 ties involving 40 teams. Only 19 were played, with the tie between Olympique Le Marin and AS Silver Star being void due to AS Silver Star withdrawing.

In the third round, the 19 winners were joined by AS Silver Star plus the twelve original byes, with 16 ties drawn. In the fourth round, eight ties were drawn.

The fifth-round draw was made on 30 September 2019, with four ties drawn.

The sixth-round draw was made on 12 October 2019, with two ties drawn.

These matches were played on 23 October 2019.

Sixth round results: Martinique
Tie no	Home team (tier)	Score	Away team (tier)
1.	(Martinique) AS Samaritaine (R1)	0–1	Golden Star (R2) (Martinique)
2.	(Martinique) Club Franciscain (R1)	2–1	Club Colonial (R1) (Martinique)

Note: Martinique League structure (no promotion to French League structure):
Régionale 1 (R1)
Régionale 2 (R2)
Régionale 3 (R3)

Golden Star and Club Franciscain qualified for the seventh round.

==== Guadeloupe ====
The draw for the opening round was made on 10 August 2019, with a total of 52 clubs participating. To align with the other qualifying competitions, this competition started at the second round. Twelve clubs from the Régional 1 division were exempted to the third round.

The sixteen ties of the third round were drawn on 3 September 2019. The fourth-round draw, with eight ties, followed on 20 September 2019. The draw for the fifth round was made at the start of October 2019. The sixth round was drawn in the week of 25 October 2019. The sixth round was drawn in the week of 25 October 2019.

These matches were played on 26 and 27 October 2019.

Sixth round results: Guadeloupe
Tie no	Home team (tier)	Score	Away team (tier)
1.	(Guadeloupe) Jeunesse Evolution (R1)	4–0	AO Gourbeyrienne (R2) (Guadeloupe)
2.	(Guadeloupe) CS Moulien (R1)	2–1	AS Le Gosier (R1) (Guadeloupe)

Note: Guadeloupe League structure (no promotion to French League structure):
Ligue Régionale 1 (R1)
Ligue Régionale 2 (R2)
Ligue Régionale 3 (R3)

Jeunesse Evolution and CS Moulien qualified for the seventh round.

==== Saint Pierre and Miquelon ====
Following a debut last year the Overseas Collectivity of Saint Pierre and Miquelon had a qualifying competition again. With only three teams in the collectivity, there is just one match in each of two rounds, with one team receiving a bye to the second round. The winner, AS Îlienne Amateurs, gained entry to the third-round draw of the Auvergne-Rhône-Alpes region.

=== Nouvelle-Aquitaine ===
A total of twelve teams qualified from the Nouvelle-Aquitaine Preliminary rounds. In 2018–19 Bergerac Périgord FC progressed furthest in the main competition, reaching the round of 32 before losing to Orléans after extra time.

The first two rounds of the qualifying competition took place on the weekends of 25 August and 1 September 2019. A total of 536 teams participated in the first round, being all the engaged teams from Régional 3 (tier 8) and below, plus 17 teams from Régional 2 (tier 7), selected according to performance in last years competition. 70 teams entered at the second-round stage, being the remaining 39 teams from Régional 2 and 31 teams from Régional 1 (tier 6).

The third-round draw was made on 5 September 2019. The 11 teams from Championnat National 3 (tier 5) entered at this stage.

The fourth-round draw was made on 20 September 2019. The four teams from Championnat National 2 (tier 4) entered at this stage. 47 ties were drawn.

The fifth-round draw was made on 3 October 2019. The single team from Championnat National (tier 3) entered at this stage. 24 ties were drawn.

The sixth-round draw was made on 17 October 2019. Twelve ties were drawn.

These matches were played on 26 and 27 October 2019

Sixth round results: Nouvelle Aquitaine
Tie no	Home team (tier)	Score	Away team (tier)
1.	Genêts Anglet (5)	1–2	FC Chauray (6)
2.	US Lège Cap Ferret (5)	1–1 (2–4 p)	Aviron Bayonnais FC (5)
3.	US Bessines-Morterolles (8)	1–4	Angoulême-Soyaux Charente (4)
4.	Stade Montois (5)	2–0	UES Montmorillon (6)
5.	Trélissac FC (4)	1–0	FCE Mérignac Arlac (5)
6.	JS Sireuil (7)	0–0 (4–2 p)	FC des Portes de l'Entre-Deux-Mers (6)
7.	Bergerac Périgord FC (4)	1–1 (4–2 p)	Stade Bordelais (4)
8.	Capaunis ASPTT FC (8)	2–8	Stade Poitevin FC (5)
9.	OL St Liguaire Niort (6)	1–0	JA Biarritz (7)
10.	CS Feytiat (6)	0–4	Pau (3)
11.	FC St Médard-en-Jalles (6)	3–1	FC Mascaret (7)
12.	FC Nueillaubiers (6)	3–1	SO Châtellerault (5)

=== Pays de la Loire ===
A total of eleven teams qualified from the Pays de la Loire Preliminary rounds. In 2018–19, Les Herbiers VF progressed furthest in the main competition, reaching the round of 32 before losing FC Villefranche.

The first two rounds of the qualifying competition took place on the weekends of 25 August and 1 September 2019. 438 teams entered in the first round, comprising 353 from the district leagues (tier 9 and below) and 85 teams from Régional 3 (tier 8). The remaining 11 teams from Régional 3 were exempted to the second round, joining at that stage along with the 38 from Régional 2 (tier 7).

The third-round draw took place on 4 September 2019. The 21 teams from Régional 1 (tier 6) and the 11 teams from Championnat National 3 (tier 5) entered at this stage.

The fourth-round draw took place on 18 September 2019. The single team from Championnat National 2 (tier 4) entered at this stage, and 42 ties were drawn.

The fifth-round draw took place on 2 October 2019. The two teams from Championnat National (tier 3) entered at this stage, and 22 ties were drawn.

The sixth-round draw took place on 16 October 2019. 11 ties were drawn.

These matches were played on 26 and 27 October 2019.

Sixth round results: Pays de la Loire
Tie no	Home team (tier)	Score	Away team (tier)
1.	US Loire et Divatte (8)	0–2	La Flèche RC (5)
2.	USSA Vertou (5)	0–0 (4–5 p)	Stade Lavallois (3)
3.	EG Rouillon (8)	0–2	US La Baule-Le Pouliguen (7)
4.	ES Pornichet (8)	1–4 (a.e.t.)	Sablé FC (5)
5.	SC Beaucouzé (6)	1–1 (2–4 p)	FC Challans (5)
6.	JS Coulaines (6)	1–4	Vendée Poiré-sur-Vie Football (6)
7.	ASI Mûrs-Erigné (7)	1–1 (4–2 p)	US Changé (5)
8.	AC Basse-Goulaine (7)	0–1	Voltigeurs de Châteaubriant (5)
9.	Vendée Fontenay Foot (5)	2–0	NDC Angers (6)
10.	Les Herbiers VF (4)	3–2	SO Cholet (3)
11.	Ancienne Château-Gontier (6)	4–2	Mareuil SC (7)

=== Centre-Val de Loire ===
A total of five teams qualified from the Centre-Val de Loire Preliminary rounds. In 2018–19, Saint-Pryvé Saint-Hilaire FC progressed furthest in the main competition, reaching the round of 32 before losing to Stade Rennais.

The first two rounds of qualifying took place on the weekends of 25 August and 1 September 2019. 225 teams entered in these rounds, from tier 6 (Regional division 1) and below. 11 teams were exempted to the second round, meaning 107 ties in the first round and 59 ties in the second round.

The third-round draw was made on 5 September 2019, with the 11 Championnat National 3 clubs entering, resulting in 35 ties.

The fourth-round draw was made on 19 September 2019, with the 5 Championnat National 1 clubs entering, resulting in 20 ties.

The fifth-round draw was made on 3 October 2019.

The sixth-round draw was made on 15 October 2019.

These matches were played on 26 and 27 October 2019.

Sixth round results: Centre-Val de Loire
Tie no	Home team (tier)	Score	Away team (tier)
1.	Blois Football 41 (4)	1–1 (2–4 p)	AS Montlouis-sur-Loire (5)
2.	Bourges Foot (4)	4–1	Avoine OCC (5)
3.	CCSP Tours (8)	0–2	C'Chartres Football (4)
4.	FC Saint-Jean-le-Blanc (6)	1–5	Saint-Pryvé Saint-Hilaire FC (4)
5.	J3S Amilly (6)	1–1 (2–4 p)	Tours FC (5)

=== Corsica ===
Two teams qualified from the Corsica Preliminary rounds. In 2018–19, SC Bastia progressed the furthest in the main competition, reaching the round of 16 before losing to Caen after a penalty shoot-out.

The opening round of the qualifying competition, analogous to the second round, took place on 1 September 2019. 14 teams from Régional 1 (tier 6) and below entered at this stage, with 12 given byes to the third round.

The third-round draw took place on 5 September 2019. The four teams from Championnat National 3 (tier 5) entered at this stage. One team, Oriente FC, were given a bye to the fourth round.

The fourth-round draw took place on 19 September 2019. The single team from Championnat National 2 (tier 4) entered at this stage, and six ties were drawn.

The fifth-round draw took place on 3 October 2019. The two teams from Championnat National (tier 3) entered at this stage, and four ties were drawn.

The sixth-round draw took place on 17 October 2019, with two ties drawn.

These matches were played on 26 and 27 October 2019.

Sixth round results: Corsica
Tie no	Home team (tier)	Score	Away team (tier)
1.	FC Balagne (5)	2–4	FC Bastia-Borgo (3)
2.	GC Lucciana (5)	0–3	Gazélec Ajaccio (3)

=== Bourgogne-Franche-Comté ===
A total of eight teams qualified from the Bourgogne-Franche-Comté Preliminary rounds. In 2018–19, none of the qualified teams made it past the eighth round.

The first two rounds of qualifying took place on the weekends of 17/18 and 24/25 August 2019. A total of 326 teams from Regional 2 (tier 7) and below were included in the draw, with 30 Regional 2 teams given byes to the second round.

The third-round draw was made on 3 September 2019. The 22 teams from Regional 1 (tier 6) and the 11 teams from Championnat National 3 (tier 5) joined at this stage.

The fourth-round draw was made on 17 September 2019. The 3 teams from Championnat National 2 (tier 4) joined at this stage.

The fifth-round draw was made on 2 October 2019. 16 ties were drawn.

The sixth-round draw was made on 16 October 2019. Eight ties were drawn.

These matches were played on 26 and 27 October 2019.

Sixth round results: Bourgogne-Franche-Comté
Tie no	Home team (tier)	Score	Away team (tier)
1.	Jura Dolois Foot (5)	0–1	FC Montceau Bourgogne (5)
2.	RC Lons-le-Saunier (6)	3–2	Is-Selongey Football (5)
3.	Jura Sud Foot (4)	2–0	Besançon Football (5)
4.	FC Gueugnon (5)	0–1	Racing Besançon (5)
5.	RC Nevers-Challuy Sermoise (8)	0–1	AS Belfort Sud (6)
6.	FC 4 Rivières 70 (6)	2–1	FC Chalon (6)
7.	ASM Belfort (4)	1–0	Louhans-Cuiseaux FC (4)
8.	US La Charité (6)	2–1	FC Grandvillars (6)

=== Grand Est ===
A total of 19 teams qualified from the Grand Est Preliminary rounds. In 2018–19, three teams made it as far as the round of 64. SC Schiltigheim lost to Dijon, US Raon-l'Étape lost to Iris Club de Croix and Olympique Strasbourg lost to Saint-Étienne.

The first round of the qualifying competition took place during the 2018–19 season, during June 2019. It consisted of 698 clubs from the district leagues (tier 9 and below of the French league system) with some clubs from the Régional 3 division (tier 8) to shape the draw.

The second round took place in August, with most ties on the weekend of 18 August, and the remainder on the weekend of 25 August. 120 teams, mainly from tiers 7 (Régional 2) and 8 (Régional 3) with two from tier 6 (Régional 1), join at this stage. One team, ASTR Wittenheim, gained re-entry as a Lucky loser due to mergers and liquidations of clubs that have taken place between the first and second rounds.

The third-round draw was made on 29 August 2019. The remaining 12 Régional 2, the remaining 36 Régional 1 teams and the 11 Championnat National 3 (tier 5) teams joined at this stage. One second round winner, Foyer Barsequanais, received a bye to the fourth round.

The fourth-round draw was made on 18 September 2019. The five Championnat National 2 (tier 4) teams joined at this stage. 76 ties were drawn.

The fifth-round draw was made on 2 October 2019. 38 ties were drawn.

The sixth-round draw was made on 16 October 2019. 19 ties were drawn.

These matches were played on 26 and 27 October 2019.

Sixth round results: Grand Est
Tie no	Home team (tier)	Score	Away team (tier)
1.	AS Erstein (6)	4–2 (a.e.t.)	US Nousseviller (7)
2.	CA Boulay (6)	4–4 (4–2 p)	Étoile Naborienne St Avold (6)
3.	RC Épernay Champagne (6)	1–2	SAS Épinal (4)
4.	AS Montigny-lès-Metz (8)	0–2	EF Reims Sainte-Anne Châtillons (6)
5.	FC Côte des Blancs (8)	1–3	US Vandœuvre (6)
6.	Le Theux FC (8)	0–2	CSO Amnéville (5)
7.	FC Hettange-Grande (8)	0–2	MJEP Cormontreuil (6)
8.	FC Lunéville (6)	3–1	GS Haroué-Benney (7)
9.	Chaumont FC (7)	0–3	US Raon-l'Étape (5)
10.	SC Schiltigheim (4)	0–2	ES Thaon (5)
11.	SSEP Hombourg-Haut (8)	1–0 (a.e.t.)	FC Saint-Louis Neuweg (5)
12.	SS Weyersheim (7)	3–3 (2–4 p)	ASPV Strasbourg (5)
13.	ES Molsheim-Ernolsheim (7)	2–2 (1–3 p)	AS Sundhoffen (7)
14.	US Forbach (6)	4–2	FC Kronenbourg Strasbourg (6)
15.	US Oberschaeffolsheim (8)	3–2	US Oberlauterbach (7)
16.	AS Illzach Modenheim (6)	0–1	FC Mulhouse (4)
17.	US Sarre-Union (5)	3–0	ASC Biesheim (5)
18.	FC Geispolsheim 01 (6)	3–2 (a.e.t.)	FCSR Haguenau (4)
19.	USA Le Chesne (7)	0–2	AS Prix-lès-Mézières (5)

=== Méditerranée ===
A total of five teams qualified from the Méditerranée Preliminary rounds. In 2018–19, Marignane Gignac FC progressed furthest in the main competition, reaching the round of 32 before losing to Iris Club de Croix after a penalty shoot-out.

The first two rounds of the qualifying competition took place on the weekends of 25 August and 2 September 2019. 180 teams entered at the first round, from the District leagues (tier 8 and below) with some from Régional 2 (tier 7), whilst the remaining nine teams from Régional 2 and the 11 teams from Régional 1 (tier 6) joined in round 2.

The third-round draw was made on 4 September 2019. The nine clubs from Championnat National 3 (tier 5) joined at this stage.

The fourth-round draw was published on 19 September 2019. The six clubs from Championnat National 2 (tier 4) joined at this stage, and 19 ties were drawn.

The fifth-round draw was published on 2 October 2019. The single club from Championnat National (tier 3) joined at this stage, and ten ties were drawn.

The sixth-round draw was made on 17 October 2019. Five ties were drawn.

These matches were played on 26 and 27 October 2019.

Sixth round results: Méditerranée
Tie no	Home team (tier)	Score	Away team (tier)
1.	FC Istres (5)	2–2 (2–3 p)	Athlético Marseille (5)
2.	EUGA Ardziv (5)	3–2	AS Cannes (5)
3.	RC Grasse (4)	2–0	AS Gémenos (5)
4.	US Cap d'Ail (7)	0–0 (3–5 p)	US Marseille Endoume (4)
5.	US St Mandrier (8)	0–3	Étoile Fréjus Saint-Raphaël (4)

=== Occitanie ===
A total of eleven teams qualified from the Occitanie Preliminary rounds. In 2018–19, FC Sète 34 progressed furthest in the main competition, reaching the round of 32 before losing to Lille OSC.

The first two rounds of the qualifying competition took place on the weekends of 25 August and 1 September 2019. A total of 460 teams were involved in the first two rounds, with 104 teams awarded byes to round two. Both the first and second rounds were arranged entirely within each district of the region.

The third-round draw was made on 4 September 2019. The 11 Championnat National 3 (tier 5) sides entered at this stage.

The fourth-round draw was made on 19 September 2019. The two sides from Championnat National 2 (tier 4) entered at this stage, and 39 ties were drawn.

The fifth-round draw was made on 3 October 2019. The single side from Championnat National (tier 3) entered at this stage, and 20 ties were drawn.

The sixth-round draw was made on 17 October 2019. Ten ties were drawn.

These matches were played on 26 and 27 October 2019.

Sixth round results: Occitanie
Tie no	Home team (tier)	Score	Away team (tier)
1.	AF Lozère (6)	2–3	AS Fabrègues (5)
2.	US Colomiers Football (4)	1–0	AS Béziers (3)
3.	Stade St Affricain (8)	1–3	AS Lattoise (6)
4.	US Salies-du-Salat/Mane/St Martory (7)	1–3	Olympique Alès (5)
5.	Soues Cigognes FC (8)	0–2	Auch Football (5)
6.	FC Marssac-Rivières-Senouillac Rives du Tarn (6)	3–1	FC Lourdais XI (6)
7.	US Monoblet (9)	1–2	RCO Agde (5)
8.	US Salinières Aigues Mortes (5)	1–3	L'Union St Jean FC (6)
9.	UF Lézignanais (8)	0–2	FC Alberes Argelès (6)
10.	Toulouse Rodéo FC (5)	3–1	Canet Roussillon FC (5)

=== Hauts-de-France ===
A total of twenty-one teams qualified from the Hauts-de-France Preliminary rounds. In 2018–19, Iris Club de Croix progressed furthest in the main competition, reaching the round of 16 before losing to Dijon.

The first two rounds of the qualifying competition took place on the weekends of 25 August and 1 September 2019. A total of 788 teams participated in the first round. 180 teams entered at the second-round stage.

The third-round draw took place on 5 September 2019. Ten teams from Championnat National 3 (tier 5) and 27 from Régional 1 (tier 6) joined the competition at this stage.

The fourth-round draw took place on 19 September 2019. Two teams from Championnat National 2 (tier 4) joined the competition at this stage, and 82 ties were drawn.

The fifth-round draw took place on 3 October 2019. Two teams from Championnat National (tier 3) joined the competition at this stage, and 42 ties were drawn.

The sixth-round draw took place on 16 October 2019.

These matches were played on 26 and 27 October and 3 November 2019.

Sixth round results: Hauts-de-France
Tie no	Home team (tier)	Score	Away team (tier)
1.	US Laon (6)	0–1	Olympique Lumbrois (7)
2.	Standard FC Montataire (8)	1–7	US Nœux-les-Mines (6)
3.	SC Coquelles (8)	1–3	Olympique Grande-Synthe (5)
4.	Calais FCHF (10)	1–2	US Saint-Omer (6)
5.	ES Montcornet (9)	1–4	US Gravelines (6)
6.	US Abbeville (9)	1–3 (a.e.t.)	USL Dunkerque (3)
7.	US Fourmies (8)	0–1	AS Beauvais Oise (5)
8.	AS Marck (6)	0–0 (5–6 p)	AC Cambrai (6)
9.	US Pays de Cassel (7)	0–2	Le Touquet AC (5)
10.	RC Bergues (10)	0–2	Grand Calais Pascal FC (7)
11.	AEF Leforest (8)	0–2	US Pont Ste-Maxence (7)
12.	Olympique Marcquois Football (5)	2–0	AC Amiens (5)
13.	AS Étaples (7)	0–0 (2–4 p)	US Boulogne (3)
14.	Wasquehal Football (6)	3–2	SC Abbeville (7)
15.	US Balagny-St Epin (7)	0–3	Olympique Saint-Quentin (4)
16.	CS Avion (6)	1–2 (a.e.t.)	US St Maximin (7)
17.	Verton FC (9)	2–0	ESC Longueau (6)
18.	Olympique Maroilles (11)	1–2	USM Senlisienne (6)
19.	US Esquelbecq (7)	0–1 (a.e.t.)	US Tourcoing FC (6)
20.	SCO Roubaix (8)	1–3 (a.e.t.)	Iris Club de Croix (4)
21.	Stade Portelois (5)	0–0 (5–3 p)	AFC Compiègne (6)

=== Normandy ===
A total of eight teams qualified from the Normandy Preliminary rounds. In 2018–19 none of the teams progressed beyond the eighth round.

The first round of the qualifying competition took place on the weekend of 24 August. A total of 284 teams participated in the first round from Régionale 3 (tier 8) and below. 11 Régionale 3 teams were given byes to the second round, and entered at that stage with all 40 Régional 2 (tier 7) teams and all 19 Régionale 1 (tier 6) teams.

The third-round draw took place on 4 September 2019. The ten Championnat National 3 (tier 5) teams entered at this stage.

The fourth-round draw took place on 19 September 2019. The three Championnat National 2 (tier 4) teams entered at this stage. 30 ties were drawn.

The fifth-round draw took place on 2 October 2019. The two Championnat National (tier 3) teams entered at this stage. 16 ties were drawn.

The sixth-round draw took place on 19 October 2019. Eight ties were drawn.

These matches were played on 26 and 27 October 2019.

Sixth round results: Normandy
Tie no	Home team (tier)	Score	Away team (tier)
1.	FC Dieppe (5)	2–0	US Alençon (5)
2.	USF Fécamp (7)	0–1	AG Caennaise (5)
3.	US Avranches (3)	0–2	FC Rouen (4)
4.	Évreux FC 27 (5)	3–0	SU Dives-Cabourg (6)
5.	AS Cherbourg Football (5)	1–2	AF Virois (5)
6.	AL Déville-Maromme (6)	1–2	US Granville (4)
7.	AS Verson (7)	0–3	ESM Gonfreville (5)
8.	Grand-Quevilly FC (5)	0–2	US Quevilly-Rouen (3)

=== Brittany ===
A total of fourteen teams qualified from the Brittany Preliminary rounds. In 2018–19, AS Vitré progressed the furthest in the main competition, reaching the quarter-final before losing to Nantes.

The first two rounds of the qualifying competition took place on the weekends of 25 August and 1 September 2019. 558 clubs entered in the first round, with 111 from Régional 3 (tier 8) and the rest from the district leagues (tier 9 and below). 22 Régional 3 and 59 Régional 2 clubs entered in the second round.

The third-round draw took place on 3 September 2019. 20 teams from Régional 1 (tier 6) and the 12 teams from Championnat National 3 (tier 5) joined the competition at this stage.

The fourth-round draw was published on 18 September 2019. Four teams from Championnat National 2 (tier 4) joined the competition at this stage. 55 ties were drawn.

The fifth-round draw was published on 2 October 2019. The single team from Championnat National (tier 3) joined the competition at this stage. 28 ties were drawn.

The sixth-round draw was published on 17 October 2019. 14 ties were drawn.

These matches were played on 26 and 27 October 2019.

Sixth round results: Brittany
Tie no	Home team (tier)	Score	Away team (tier)
1.	TA Rennes (5)	6–1	FC Atlantique Vilaine (6)
2.	Baud FC (8)	0–1	US Montagnarde (6)
3.	OC Cesson (6)	0–1	Stade Briochin (4)
4.	Riantec OC (9)	3–3 (6–7 p)	CEP Lorient (6)
5.	US Liffré (7)	1–1 (3–4 p)	Stade Pontivyen (5)
6.	Stade Paimpolais FC (7)	1–1 (4–3 p)	Saint-Colomban Sportive Locminé (5)
7.	St Pierre Milizac (6)	4–0	FC Dinardais (7)
8.	AS Ménimur (7)	1–3	FC Guichen (5)
9.	Gars de St Yves (7)	0–1	CS Betton (8)
10.	US Quimperoise (7)	1–6	Dinan-Léhon FC (5)
11.	Guipavas GdR (6)	2–2 (5–6 p)	Avenir Theix (7)
12.	Stade Plabennécois (5)	6–1	Fougères AGLD (5)
13.	SC Le Rheu (6)	2–0	Lamballe FC (6)
14.	AS Vignoc-Hédé-Guipel (6)	1–1 (2–4 p)	US Concarneau (3)

=== Paris-Île-de-France ===
A total of eleven teams qualified from the Paris-Île-de-France Preliminary rounds. In 2018–19, Noisy-le-Grand FC progressed furthest in the main competition, reaching the round of 32 before losing to SC Bastia.

The first two rounds of the qualifying competition took place during the 2018–19 season. The first round consisted of the clubs in the district leagues (level 9 and below of the French league system). 360 teams entered at this stage, and the draw was made on 28 March 2019. An additional 87 teams from the regional league (levels 6 to 8) entered at the second-round stage, with one winner from round 1 (FC Romainville) being given a bye to round three. The draw was published on 2 May 2019 with matches taking place in June.

The third-round draw was made at the end of August 2019, with the remaining teams from Championnat National 3 (tier 5) joining the competition. 68 ties were scheduled, with seven second round winners given byes to the fourth round (UJA Maccabi Paris Métropole, AC Houilles, AS Ballainvilliers, Cergy-Pontoise FC, FC Morangis-Chilly, OFC Pantin, US Mauloise).

The fourth-round draw was made on 17 September 2019, with the nine Championnat National 2 teams entering, and 42 ties drawn. The fifth-round draw was made on 1 October 2019, with the two Championnat National teams entering, and 22 ties drawn.

The sixth-round draw was made on 15 October 2019, with 11 ties drawn.

These matches were played on 26 and 27 October 2019.

Sixth round results: Paris-Île-de-France
Tie no	Home team (tier)	Score	Away team (tier)
1.	Montreuil FC (6)	2–3	CSM Gennevilliers (7)
2.	AAS Sarcelles (7)	0–3	Red Star FC (3)
3.	CS Brétigny (6)	3–3 (3–5 p)	Sainte-Geneviève Sports (4)
4.	CS Meaux (6)	1–1 (3–2 p)	FC Fleury 91 (4)
5.	ES Viry-Châtillon (6)	0–0 (4–5 p)	FC Versailles 78 (5)
6.	ES Nanterre (7)	2–1 (a.e.t.)	UJA Maccabi Paris Métropole (7)
7.	L'Entente SSG (4)	3–1	FC Gobelins (4)
8.	ESA Linas-Montlhéry (6)	3–2 (a.e.t.)	Espérance Aulnay (6)
9.	Olympique Noisy-le-Sec (6)	0–2	US Créteil-Lusitanos (3)
10.	Olympique Adamois (7)	3–2	FC Franconville (8)
11.	Villemomble Sports (7)	1–0	Blanc-Mesnil SF (5)

=== Auvergne-Rhône-Alpes ===
A total of nineteen teams qualified from the Auvergne-Rhône-Alpes Preliminary rounds. In 2018–19, two teams reached the round of 16. FC Villefranche lost to Paris Saint-Germain after extra time, and AS Lyon Duchère lost to AS Vitré.

The first two rounds took place on the weekends of 25 August 2019 and 1 September 2019. Additionally, there was a cadrage, or intermediate framing round on 8 September 2019 to obtain the number of teams required in the third round. 798 teams took place in the first round, from tier 8 (Regional division 3) and below. One winning team (from first round tie number 311) was given a bye in the second round. There were six ties in the cadrage round.

The third-round draw took place on 3 September 2019, with the 193 second round winner joined by the team given a bye, FC Belle Étoile Mercury, the team from Saint Pierre et Miquelon, AS Îlienne Amateurs, the 48 teams from Régional 2 (tier 7), the 22 teams from Régional 1 (tier 6) and the 11 teams from Championnat National 3 (tier 5).

The fourth-round draw took place on 17 September 2019. The six teams from Championnat National 2 (tier 4) joined at this stage, with 72 ties being drawn.

The fifth-round draw took place on 3 October 2019. The four teams from Championnat National (tier 3) joined at this stage, with 38 ties being drawn.

The sixth-round draw took place on 17 October 2019. 19 ties were drawn.

These matches were played on 26 and 27 October 2019.

Sixth round results: Auvergne-Rhône-Alpes
Tie no	Home team (tier)	Score	Away team (tier)
1.	US Mozac (8)	3–2 (a.e.t.)	AS Saint-Priest (4)
2.	FC Vaulx-en-Velin (5)	– (Note: Original scoreline 2–1. FC Vaulx-en-Velin penalised for fielding too many transferred players. Olympique de Valence qualify.)	Olympique de Valence (6)
3.	FC Bourgoin-Jallieu (5)	3–2 (a.e.t.)	Ain Sud Foot (5)
4.	CA Maurienne (8)	0–3	FC Limonest (5)
5.	ES Chilly (7)	1–0	SC Cruas (7)
6.	AS Misérieux-Trévoux (7)	0–1	FC Villefranche (3)
7.	FC Charvieu-Chavagneux (7)	0–4	Football Bourg-en-Bresse Péronnas 01 (3)
8.	AS Algerienne Villeurbanne (8)	3–4	Chassieu Décines FC (6)
9.	Thonon Évian FC (6)	1–0	Monts d'Or Anse Foot (4)
10.	US Annemasse-Gaillard (8)	0–7	Annecy FC (4)
11.	FC Roche-St Genest (7)	0–1	Moulins Yzeure Foot (4)
12.	US St Galmier-Chambœuf (8)	2–0	FC Aurillac Arpajon Cantal Auvergne (5)
13.	Ytrac Foot (6)	0–1	Le Puy Foot 43 Auvergne (3)
14.	Hauts Lyonnais (5)	0–0 (5–4 p)	AS Lyon-Duchère (3)
15.	Côte Chaude Sportif (7)	2–0	St Chamond Foot (7)
16.	AS Moulins (6)	0–4	US Saint-Flour (5)
17.	Montluçon FC (11)	0–1	FC Cournon-d'Auvergne (7)
18.	FC Lyon (7)	4–1 (a.e.t.)	Velay FC (6)
19.	AS Craponne (9)	0–1	US Annecy-le-Vieux (7)
