= Rémi Souyeux =

French footballer (born 1984)

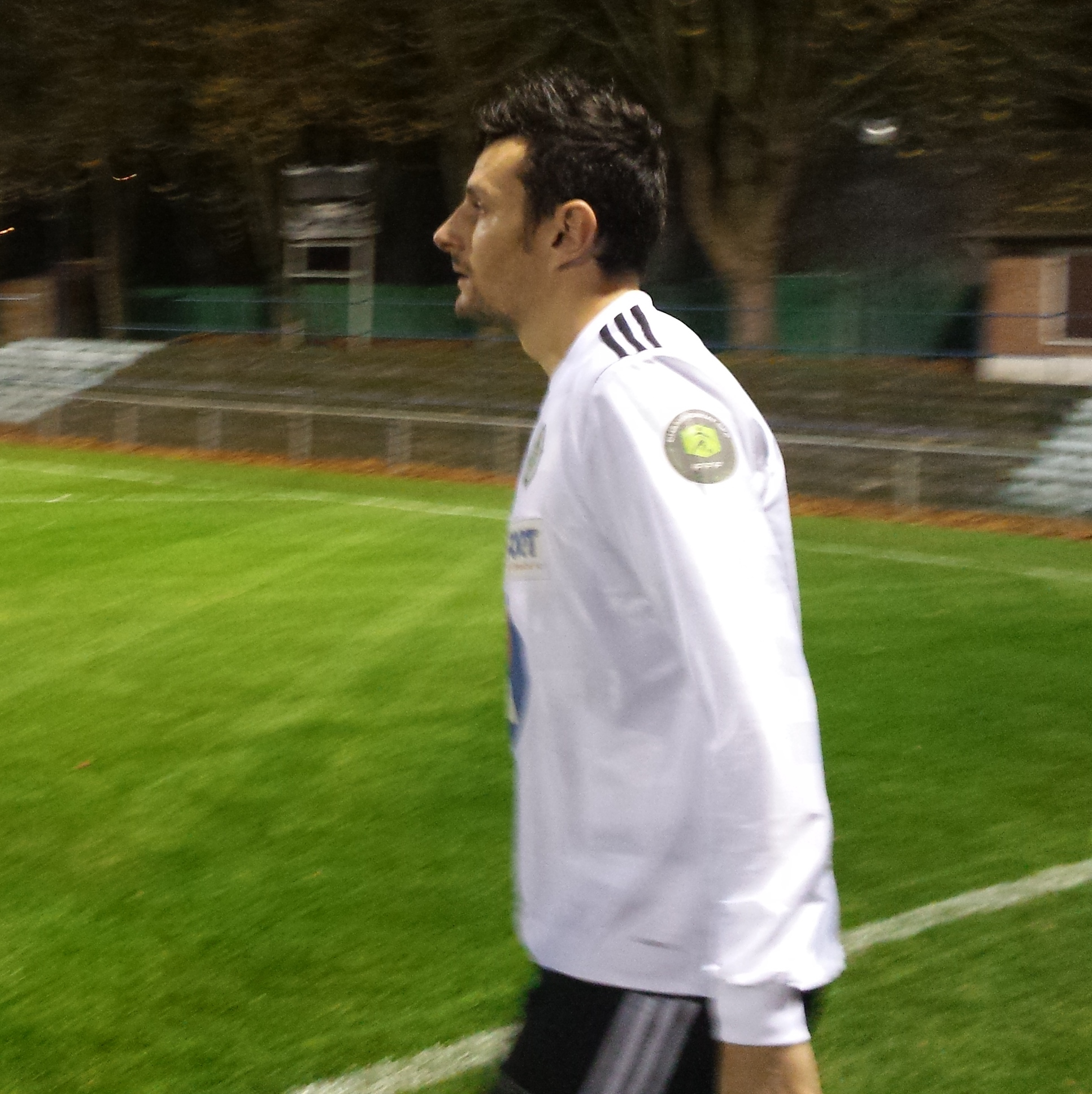
- Souyeux with Romorantin in November 2014

Personal information
- Full name: Rémi Souyeux
- Date of birth: 19 July 1984 (age 42)
- Place of birth: Toulouse, France
- Height: 1.86 m (6 ft 1 in)
- Position: Striker

Team information
- Current team: Romorantin

Senior career*
Years	Team	Apps	(Gls)
2001–2002	Balma	0	(0)
2002–2003	Pau	0	(0)
2003–2004	Alès		
2004–2005	Nîmes	0	(0)
2005–2006	Troyes	0	(0)
2006–2007	Martigues	14	(1)
2007–2008	Rodez	31	(10)
2008–2009	Dijon	22	(2)
2009–2011	Paris FC	35	(7)
2009–2010	Colmar	15	(5)
2011–2014	Luzenac	60	(11)
2014–	Romorantin	170	(50)
- * Club domestic league appearances and goals as of 15:29, 14 April 2022 (UTC)

Rémi Souyeux (born 19 July 1984) is a French professional footballer who plays as a striker for Championnat National 1 side Romorantin.
