= Yoan Pivaty =

Footballer (born 1990)

Personal information
- Date of birth: 29 January 1990 (age 36)
- Place of birth: Montreuil, France
- Height: 1.80 m (5 ft 11 in)
- Positions: Midfielder; forward

Youth career
- Rennes

Senior career*
Years	Team	Apps	(Gls)
2007–2010	Rennes B	29	(1)
2010–2011	La Vitréenne	12	(0)
2011–2012	Viry-Châtillon	25	(6)
2012	Etar 1924	9	(0)
2013–2015	Avranches	54	(6)
2015–2018	Le Mans	60	(4)
2018–2023	Romorantin	77	(1)

International career
2012–2014	Martinique	4	(0)
- * Club domestic league appearances and goals

Yoan Pivaty (born 29 January 1990) is a professional footballer who plays as a midfielder and forward. Born in metropolitan France, he played for the Martinique national team from 2012 to 2014.

== Club career ==
Pivaty is a Rennes youth product. In August 2015 he joined Le Mans.

== International career ==
Born in Montreuil, France, in October 2012, Pivaty received his first call-up to play for the Martinique national team for Caribbean Championship qualifiers against Puerto Rico, Dominican Republic and Guadeloupe. He made his debut on 23 October, in a 2–1 win over Puerto Rico.
