= Toulouse Fontaines Club =

Defunct association football club in France

Toulouse Fontaines
- Founded: 1932
- Dissolved: 2016
- Ground: Stade des Fontaines
- Capacity: 2,000

Toulouse Fontaines Club was a football club based in Toulouse, France. Their stadium was in the rue des Fontaines, in the Saint-Cyprien suburb of Toulouse. The club was dissolved in 2016 as part of a merger with Toulouse Saint-Jo Football SC to form Toulouse Métropole FC.

== History ==
In 1978, the Toulouse Fontaines Club achieved promotion to the newly formed Division 4, thus leaving their regional league to play in a national competition for the first time. Since then, they never went back to regional football, always playing in D4 and D3, and CFA and CFA 2 after the reform of French leagues.

In 1997, they reached the Round of 32 of the Coupe de France, losing 2–0 to Bordeaux.

== Notable players ==
- (France) Noah Edjouma (youth)
- (France) Romain Perraud (youth)
