= Balma SC =

French football club

Balma
- Full name: Balma Sporting Club
- Founded: 1957
- Ground: Stade Municipal de Balma
- Capacity: 4,000
- Chairman: Roger Cau
- Manager: Sébastien Mignotte
- League: Régional 1 Occitanie
- 2022–23: National 3 Group H, 12th
- Website: www.balmafoot.com
Home colours	Away colours

Balma Sporting Club is a football club founded located in Balma, France. Founded in 1957, they play their home matches at the Stade Municipal de Balma, which has a capacity of 4,000. As of the 2023–24 season, they play in Régional 1, the sixth tier of French football.

== History ==
The club won promotion to the national level of the French football pyramid for the first time in 1999, as champions of Division d'Honneur of the Midi-Pyrénées league. They remained at the fourth or fifth tier of the pyramid until 2023, when they were relegated back to the regional league.

== Current squad ==
As of 21 March 2019

Note: Flags indicate national team as defined under FIFA eligibility rules; some limited exceptions apply. Players may hold more than one non-FIFA nationality.

No.	Pos.	Nation	Player
—	GK	FRA	Anthony Mwembia
—	GK	FRA	Rémi Goryl
—	DF	FRA	Fanch Weyders
—	DF	FRA	Gauthier Desfontaine
—	DF	FRA	Thomas Larme
—	DF	COD	Nikolaos Karagiannis
—	DF	FRA	Adrien Perez
—	DF	FRA	Jordan Fauqué
—	DF	FRA	Yanel Temmar
—	DF	FRA	Roméo Vena Diambu
—	DF	ALG	Guillaume Velez
—	DF	FRA	Cheikh Bangré

No.	Pos.	Nation	Player
—	MF	FRA	Bryant Madou
—	MF	SEN	Mamadou Camara
—	MF	FRA	Kaoussou Diakhaté
—	FW	FRA	Mathieu Castaing
—	FW	GUI	Anibal Koné
—	FW	FRA	Fouad Oumiha
—	FW	CMR	Adama Garba Babanguida
—	FW	FRA	Abdou Karamoko
—	FW	FRA	Thomas Ramothe
—	FW	FRA	Martin Lazuech
—			
—			
