= AS Saint-Amandoise =

French football club

- Full name: Association Sportive Saint-Amandoise
- Founded: 1989
- Ground: Stade Municipal Alphonse Gesset, Saint-Amand-Montrond
- Chairman: Philippe Gastelet
- Manager: Franck Sanson
- League: Division Régionale 1
Home colours	Away colours

Association Sportive Saint-Amandoise is a French association football club founded in 1989. They are based in the town of Saint-Amand-Montrond and their home stadium is the Stade Municipal Alphonse Gesset. As of the 2013–14 season, the club plays in the Division d'Honneur de Centre, the sixth tier of French football.
