= AC Amboise =

French football club

- Full name: Athletic Club Amboisien
- Founded: 1920
- Ground: Stade Georges Boulogne, Amboise
- Chairman: Larbi Boussa
- Manager: Alain Guillon
- League: Division d'Honneur de Centre
- 2008–09: DH Centre, 6th
Home colours

Athletic Club Amboisien is a French association football club founded in 1920. They are based in the town of Amboise and their home stadium is the Stade Georges Boulogne. As of the 2009–10 season, the club plays in the Division d'Honneur de Centre, the sixth tier of French football.
