= USM Olivet =

French football club

- Full name: Union Sportive Municipale d'Olivet
- Founded: 1960
- Ground: Stade du Couasnon and stade du donjon Olivet
- Chairman: Hubert Bureau
- Manager: Jacky Froissart
- League: Promotion d'honneur de Centre
Home colours

Union Sportive Municipale d'Olivet is a French association football club founded in 1960. They are based in the town of Olivet, Loiret and their home stadium is the Stade du Couasnon. As of the 2009–10 season, the club plays in the Promotion d'honneur de Centre, the seventh tier of French football. Their u19 team are in Division d'honneur régionale. Since the arrival of captain Enzo Lehocq, they have seen success.
