= US Saint-Pierre-des-Corps =

French football club

Saint-Pierre-des-Corps
- Full name: Union Sportive Saint-Pierre-des-Corps Football
- Founded: 1941
- Ground: Stade Camelinat, Saint-Pierre-des-Corps
- Chairman: Raymond Bessay
- League: Promotion d'Honneur du Centre Group A
Home colours

Union Sportive Saint-Pierre-des-Corps Football is a French association football club founded in 1941. They are based in the town of Saint-Pierre-des-Corps and their home stadium is the Stade Camelinat. As of the 2009–10 season, the club plays in the Promotion d'Honneur de Centre, the eighth tier of French football.

== Notable players ==
- (France) Mikaël Silvestre (youth)
