= CCSP Tours =

French football club

- Full name: Centre Culturel et Sportive Portugais de Tours
- Ground: Stade des Tourettes, Tours
- League: Division d'Honneur Regionale de Centre

Centre Culturel et Sportive Portugais de Tours is a French association football club. They are based in the town of Tours and their home stadium is the Stade des Tourettes. As of the 2009–10 season, the club plays in the Division d'Honneur Regionale de Centre, the seventh tier of French football.
