= FC Déolois =

Déolois
- Full name: Football Club Déolois
- Founded: 1968
- Ground: Stade Municipal Jean Bizet, Déols
- Chairman: Christian Lachaud
- Manager: Alexandre Ballereau
- League: Régional 1 Centre-Val de Loire
- 2021–22: National 3 Group C, 13th (relegated)
- Website: https://fcd.footeo.com
Home colours

Football Club Déolois is a French association football club founded in 1968. They are based in the town of Déols and their home stadium is the Stade Municipal Jean Bizet. In 2020 the club secured promotion to National 3, the fifth tier of the French football league system. They suffered relegation back to the regional level in 2022.
