= Sologne Foot Romorantin =

French football club

- Full name: Sologne Foot Romorantin 41
- Founded: 1930
- Ground: Stade Jules-Ladoumègue
- Capacity: 6,200 (2,200 seated)
- Manager: Yann Lachuer
- League: National 1 Group B
- 2022–23: National 2 Group D, 7th
- Website: https://soromorantin.com
Home colours	Away colours

Sologne Foot Romorantin is a French association football team founded in 1930 as Stade Olympique Romoratinais. It is based in Romorantin-Lanthenay, Centre-Val de Loire, France and plays in the Championnat National 1. It plays at the Stade Jules Ladoumègue in Romorantin-Lanthenay, which has a capacity of 8,033. In 2009, the club surprised in the French Cup by eliminating Ligue 1 side AS Nancy.

In 2015 the club was renamed to Sologne Olympique Romorantin.

== Current squad ==
As of 13 April 2022

Note: Flags indicate national team as defined under FIFA eligibility rules; some limited exceptions apply. Players may hold more than one non-FIFA nationality.

No.	Pos.	Nation	Player
—	GK	BEN	Yoann Djidonou
—	DF	FRA	Alexandre Castro
—	DF	FRA	Hermann Esmel
—	DF	SEN	Adiouma Gaye
—	DF	FRA	Maxence Lomonnier
—	DF	FRA	Isaac Ngoma
—	DF	FRA	Papis Mendy
—	DF	GUI	Djibril Paye
—	MF	FRA	Geoffrey Adjet
—	MF	FRA	Naël Arzalai

No.	Pos.	Nation	Player\
—	MF	FRA	Nordine Benaries
—	MF	FRA	Benjamin Duvoux
—	MF	FRA	Jean-Baptiste Gérard
—	MF	MTQ	Yoan Pivaty
—	MF	FRA	Anthony Vacheron
—	FW	FRA	Dylan Cardoso
—	FW	FRA	Bamoye Kekoumana
—	FW	FRA	Lenny Leonil
—	FW	FRA	Yannis Ouhammou
—	FW	FRA	Rémi Souyeux

== Season-by-Season ==
Season	Division	Position
1997-1998	Championnat de France Amateur Group C	5th
1998-1999	Championnat de France Amateur Group C	8th
1999-2000	Championnat de France Amateur Group C	3rd
2000-2001	Championnat de France Amateur Group C	10th
2001-2002	Championnat de France Amateurs Group C	1st
2002-2003	Championnat National	11th
2003-2004	Championnat National	4th
2004-2005	Championnat National	14th
2005-2006	Championnat National	10th
2006-2007	Championnat National	10th
2007-2008	Championnat National	20th
2008-2009	Championnat de France Amateur Group C	7th
2009-2010	Championnat de France Amateur Group D	8th
2010-2011	Championnat de France Amateur Group D	11th
2011-2012	Championnat de France Amateur Group D	5th
2012-2013	Championnat de France Amateur Group D	5th
2013-2014	Championnat de France Amateur Group D	12th
2014-2015	Championnat de France Amateur Group A	8th
2015-2016	Championnat de France Amateur Group D	3rd
2016-2017	Championnat de France Amateur Group A	7th

== Former coaches ==
- (France) Ludovic Lidon
- (France) Xavier Dudoit
