= Death and funeral of Wallis, Duchess of Windsor =

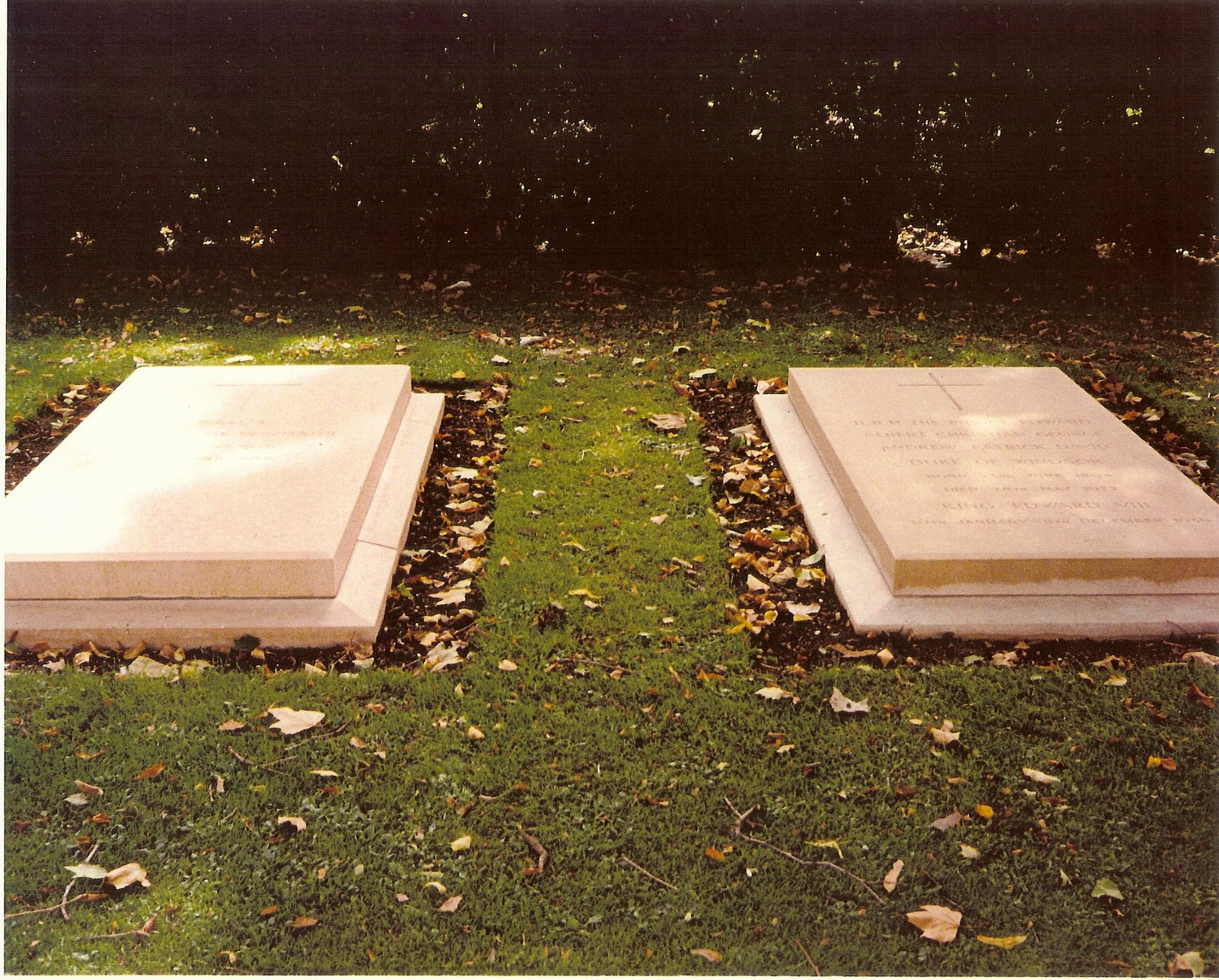
The graves of the Duchess (left) and Duke of Windsor in the Royal Burial Ground, Frogmore

The funeral of Wallis, Duchess of Windsor (born Bessie Wallis Warfield, later Spencer, later Simpson), took place on April 29, 1986. Wallis was the widow of Prince Edward, Duke of Windsor, who had been King of the United Kingdom from January 20 to December 11, 1936, reigning as Edward VIII before his abdication to marry Wallis, an American divorcée. She was living in Paris at the time of her death. Her funeral took place at St George's Chapel in Windsor Castle and she was buried next to her husband at the Royal Burial Ground at Frogmore.

== Background ==
At the time of her husband's death in 1972, Wallis was suffering from mental confusion due to arteriosclerosis. She became increasingly frail and eventually suffered from dementia, living the final years of her life as a recluse, supported by both her husband's estate and an allowance from Queen Elizabeth II. She suffered several falls and broke her hip twice. She also suffered a series of strokes. By 1980, her speech had become fully impaired and she lost her ability to speak. A severe case of arthritis resulted in her fingers becoming so malformed that they could no longer hold her wedding ring. Records were also played for her in her bedroom to reduce the effects of dementia on her memory. Towards the end, she was confined to bed and did not receive any visitors, apart from her doctor and nurses.

Wallis died on April 24, 1986, at 4 route du Champ d'Entraînement in Paris, about two months short of her 90th birthday. Commenting on her final years and suffering, her friend Diana, Lady Mosley said "It wasn't really a life at all. I'm delighted to hear she has died. I wish she'd died many years ago." On April 27, her remains were flown from Paris by an aircraft of the Queen's Flight to RAF Benson and then escorted by a seven-car cortège. Flags flew at half-mast on government buildings and floral tributes were sent from around the world. A period of mourning was observed from April 25 to April 29, the day of her funeral.

== Funeral and burial ==
A private funeral service was held on April 29 at St George's Chapel, Windsor Castle. 175 mourners were present for the ceremony, including members of the British royal family, and members of Wallis' household such as her butler and chauffeur. Her polished English oak lead lined coffin (not draped in a standard) had a single wreath from Queen Elizabeth II on top, which consisted of a spray of white, orange and yellow lilies picked at Windsor Castle. The silver plaque on her casket read "Wallis, Duchess of Windsor 1896–1986" without the HRH prefix. The prefix does not appear on her gravestone either. Eight Welsh Guards served as pallbearers during the ceremony. The service lasted 28 minutes and was conducted by the Dean of Windsor. Per Wallis' wishes there was no funeral address during the ceremony. The ceremony also featured no eulogies and no direct references were made to the Duchess. Only once in a prayer, the Canon of Westminster made a reference to her as "Our sister".

Accompanying the Queen were the Duke of Edinburgh, Queen Elizabeth the Queen Mother, the Prince and Princess of Wales, Princess Anne, Princess Alice, Duchess of Gloucester, and other members of the royal family. Other attendees were Prime Minister Margaret Thatcher and her husband Denis Thatcher, Leader of the Opposition Neil Kinnock, U.S. Ambassador Charles H. Price II, Lady Alexandra Metcalfe, the Duke and Duchess of Marlborough, and Diana, Lady Mosley. Those absent from the service included Princess Margaret, as well as Prince Andrew and Prince Edward, whom the palace said barely knew Wallis. After the funeral, her coffin was taken out of the chapel as Edward Elgar's "Nimrod" played. A hearse took the coffin via private roads for the burial.

The burial was attended by only 15 people, including the Queen, the Duke of Edinburgh, the Prince and Princess of Wales, the Dowager Countess of Dudley, two royal household aides, the Dean of Windsor, and seven members of Wallis' personal household. The Queen Mother was not present at the gravesite on the advice of Queen Elizabeth II. Wallis was buried at the Royal Burial Ground, Frogmore, next to her husband. The Princess of Wales said afterwards that it was the only time she had seen the Queen weep. The media reported that per Wallis' wishes a series of her love letters to Edward would be published after her death. On April 28, the Mail serialized them in a special pullout supplement.

Most of Wallis' estate, valued at £5 million, went to the Pasteur Institute medical research foundation, as a tribute to France where she was provided with a home. The royal family received no major bequests. Her Paris mansion and some of her other possessions were later acquired by Mohamed Al-Fayed and subsequently auctioned in 1998 at Sotheby’s where they were acquired in their near entirety by the Royal Family.
