= List of British monarchs =

British monarchs

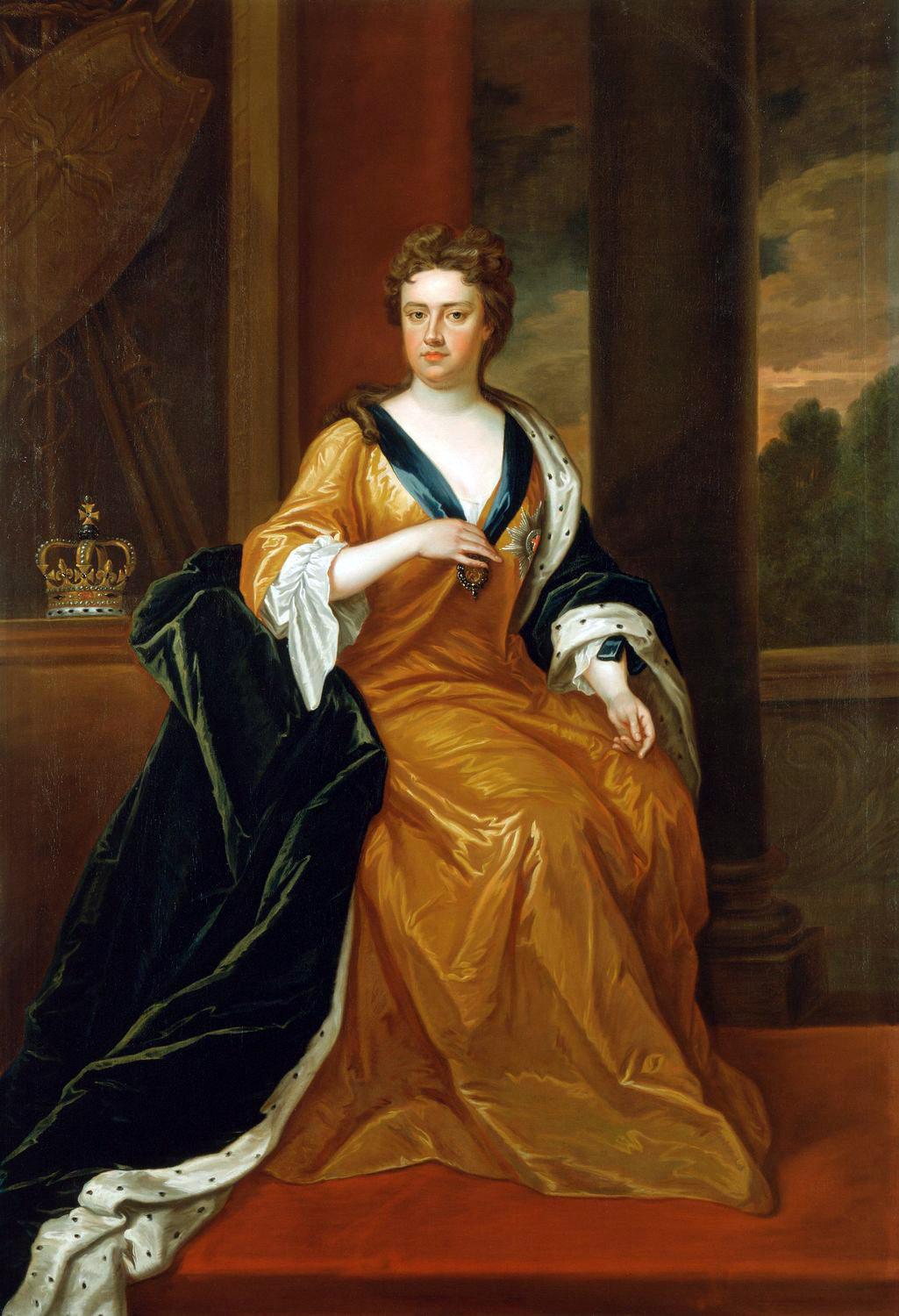
Anne became the first monarch of Great Britain in 1707.

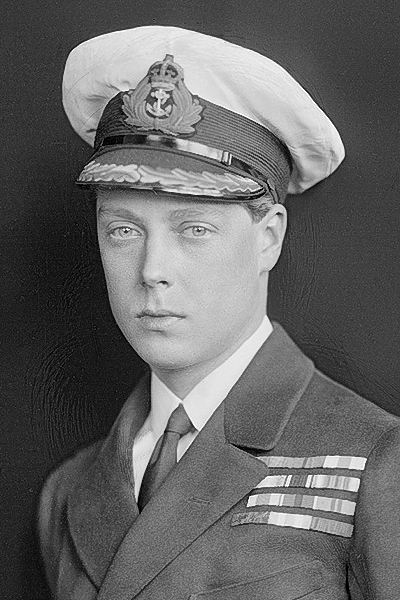
Edward VIII had the shortest reign at 326 days.

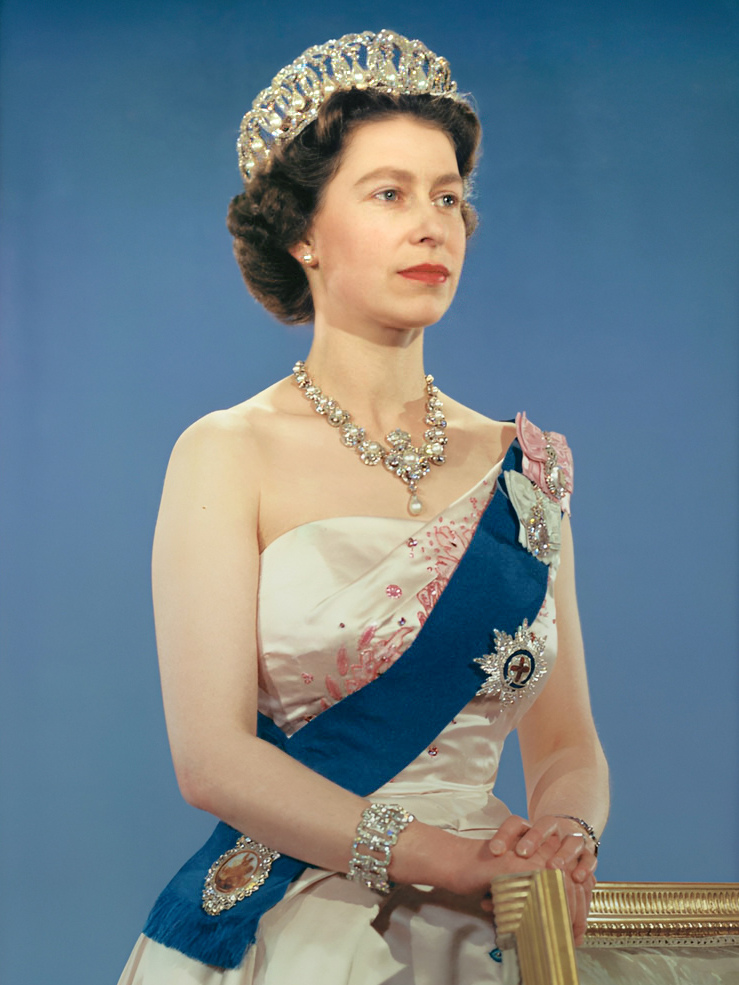
Elizabeth II had the longest reign at 70 years 214 days.

Charles III is the current King of the United Kingdom.

There have been 13 British monarchs since the political union of the Kingdom of England and the Kingdom of Scotland, which occurred on 1 May 1707 upon the commencement of the Acts of Union. The first British monarch was Anne, who reigned between 1707 and 1714; the current monarch is Charles III, who acceded to the throne in September 2022. Although the style of "King of Great Britain" had been in use since the personal union of England and Scotland on 24 March 1603 under James VI and I, the official title came into effect legislatively in 1707 and therefore, apart from Anne, this list of British monarchs does not include the four earlier kings and one queen who ruled as monarchs of England and Scotland at the same time.

On 1 January 1801, the Kingdom of Great Britain and the Kingdom of Ireland merged to create the United Kingdom of Great Britain and Ireland. This later became the United Kingdom of Great Britain and Northern Ireland upon the secession of the Irish Free State (now the Republic of Ireland) in the 1920s. British monarchs have also held various other titles reflecting their claims outside of the United Kingdom, including King of Hanover, Emperor of India, and Head of the Commonwealth. The title of monarch also comes with various secondary titles for land within the United Kingdom, such as the Duchy of Lancaster.

== Background ==
Before 1603, the Kingdom of England and the Kingdom of Scotland were independent states with different monarchs. Upon James VI of Scotland inheriting the monarchy of England from his cousin Elizabeth I, however, the two independent countries began sharing a monarch in a personal union known as the Union of the Crowns. Between November 1606 and July 1607 unification between the two countries was discussed in Parliament. While the English Parliament agreed to certain concessions to the Scots, it refused union. In October 1604, James VI and I declared himself to be the 'King of Great Britain'. The style was used on coins, stamps, and elsewhere, but the Parliament of England did not use it officially, nor did they consider him the King of a single unified country.

James's great-granddaughter, Anne, ascended both thrones on 8 March 1702, upon the death of her brother-in-law and cousin William III, becoming Queen of England and Queen of Scotland. In November that year, Anne began negotiations with the Parliament of Scotland about a possible union of the two countries, but by 1704 they had ended without a deal. In 1706, a new proposal was debated that involved the merger of Scotland and England into a new country called 'Great Britain'. A final version of the proposal was presented to Anne in July that year. In January and March 1707, the Treaty of Union was passed by the Scottish and English parliaments respectively, with the union beginning from May.

Despite having eighteen pregnancies, Anne did not produce an heir that survived her or to adulthood. Before union, England had passed the Act of Settlement 1701 which defined Anne's cousin Sophia of Hanover and her heirs as Anne's successor in England and Ireland and disqualified Catholics from becoming monarch. However, Scotland had passed its own law, the Act of Security 1704, which allowed its parliament to choose an heir upon Anne's death. On union, Great Britain adopted the English succession and the Act of Security was repealed. When Anne died in 1714, she was succeeded by George I, Sophia of Hanover's eldest son.

== Statistics ==
The thirteen monarchs consist of ten kings and three queens. Only two monarchs were born outside of the United Kingdom; these were George I and George II, who were both born in Germany. All but two monarchs died in the United Kingdom: George I died while he was still King, during a trip to his birthplace; Edward VIII (by then Prince Edward, Duke of Windsor) died in Villa Windsor, Paris, while living in exile in France having abdicated over 35 years beforehand. The longest reigning monarch was Elizabeth II, who reigned for 70 years and 214 days between 1952 and 2022; the shortest reigning monarch was Edward VIII, who reigned for 326 days between January and December 1936. Only two of the thirteen monarchs have not been crowned as a monarch of Great Britain or the United Kingdom: Anne was crowned in 1702 before the Treaty of Union; and Edward VIII abdicated before he could be crowned.

=== Other titles ===
Between George I and William IV, all monarchs had the additional office of Elector of Hanover (later King of Hanover). Hanover was a separate kingdom with its own government and army. When Victoria acceded to the throne in 1837, she could not become the Queen of Hanover suo jure as it followed Salic law, meaning that it could only be inherited by men through the male-line. Instead, her uncle Ernest Augustus became King of Hanover.

As well as being the monarch of Great Britain (1707–1801) or the United Kingdom (1801–), monarchs have held various other titles ex officio. On 1 May 1876, Victoria accepted the title of Empress of India from parliament under then-Prime Minister Benjamin Disraeli. Monarchs held this title until George VI issued a Royal Proclamation renouncing it on 22 June 1948, in line with India's independence from the United Kingdom. Since 1949, the monarch has instead been the ceremonial Head of the Commonwealth. The monarch also holds all titles that have been merged into the Crown, such as Duke of Lancaster, which has been a secondary title of the monarch since 1399, and Duke of Normandy, which has been a secondary title of the monarch since 1106.

== List ==
British monarchs since 1 May 1707
Monarch			Life			Reign (Note: Old Style and New Style dates are used in line with the calendar of the time; New Style is used from 1752 onward.)		House	Ref. (Note: All information is sourced from the provided pages of Alison Weir's Britain's Royal Families: The Complete Genealogy unless other sources are referenced in a cell.)
Name	Portrait	Coat of arms	Birth	Spouse	Death	Accession Coronation	Ended Length	House	Ref.
Anne	An oil portrait of Queen Anne in a long dress, holding the orb in her left hand and the sceptre in her right hand, leaning against her shoulder; she is also wearing the Tudor crown.	A coat of arms that comprises a shield in four quadrants.	6 February 1665 St James's Palace	George of Denmark (m. 1683–1708)	1 August 1714 Kensington Palace	1 May 1707 23 April 1702 (Note: Anne had been crowned on St George's Day (23 April), 1702 as Queen of England, Scotland, and Ireland; she was not coronated again after becoming Queen of Britain.)	1 August 1714 7 years, 92 days (Note: Anne's entire reign (8 March 1702 – 1 August 1714) —first as Queen of England; Scotland; and Ireland, and after the Acts of Union 1707 as Queen of Britain— lasted 12 years, 146 days.)	Stuart	
George I George Louis	An oil portrait of George I in his coronation robes, holding the orb in his right hand and an unknown sword in his left hand. On the table to his right is the Imperial State Crown of George I.	A coat of arms that comprises a shield in four quadrants. The bottom right quadrant is its own coat of arms that is split into three equal sections with a crown in the centre.	28 May 1660 Osnabrück, Hanover	Sophia Dorothea of Celle (m. 1682; div. 1694)	11 June 1727 Osnabrück, Hanover	1 August 1714 20 October 1714	11 June 1727 12 years, 314 days	Hanover	
George II; George Augustus	An oil portrait of George II in his coronation robes, holding the sceptre in his right hand. On the table to his right is the Imperial State Crown of George I.	A coat of arms that comprises a shield in four quadrants. The bottom right quadrant is its own coat of arms that is split into three equal sections with a crown in the centre.	30 October 1683 Herrenhausen Palace, Hanover	Caroline of Brandenburg-Ansbach (m. 1705; died 1737)	25 October 1760 Kensington Palace	11 June 1727 11 October 1727	25 October 1760 33 years, 125 days	Hanover	
George III; George William Frederick	An oil portrait of George III in his coronation robes. On the table to his left is the Imperial State Crown of George I, which his left hand is leaning on.	Until 1801 1801–1816 (Note: For his coat of arms before 1801 and after 1816, see the above and below entries in the column) From 1816	24 May 1738 Norfolk House	Charlotte of Mecklenburg-Strelitz (m. 1761; died 1818)	29 January 1820 Windsor Castle	25 October 1760 22 September 1761	29 January 1820 59 years, 96 days	Hanover	
George IV; George Augustus Frederick	An oil portrait of George I in his coronation robes. On the table to his right is the Imperial State Crown of George I.	A coat of arms that comprises a shield in four quadrants. There is a second smaller shield in the centre of the four quadrants, which itself contains three sections and a crown in the centre, as well as a crown on top of the inner shield.	12 August 1762 St James's Palace	Maria Fitzherbert (married illegally 1785; died 1837) (Note: George's attempted marriage to Maria Fitzherbert was not a legal marriage under the Act of Settlement 1701 and the Royal Marriages Act 1772, and therefore it was considered void.)	26 June 1830; Windsor Castle	29 January 1820 19 July 1821	26 June 1830 10 years, 148 days	Hanover	
George IV; George Augustus Frederick	An oil portrait of George I in his coronation robes. On the table to his right is the Imperial State Crown of George I.	A coat of arms that comprises a shield in four quadrants. There is a second smaller shield in the centre of the four quadrants, which itself contains three sections and a crown in the centre, as well as a crown on top of the inner shield.	12 August 1762 St James's Palace	Caroline of Brunswick (m. 1795; died 1821)	26 June 1830; Windsor Castle	29 January 1820 19 July 1821	26 June 1830 10 years, 148 days	Hanover	
William IV; William Henry	An oil portrait of William IV in his coronation robes. On the table to his left is the Crown of St Edward.	A coat of arms that comprises a shield in four quadrants. There is a second smaller shield in the centre of the four quadrants, which itself contains three sections and a crown in the centre, as well as a crown on top of the inner shield.	21 August 1765 Buckingham House	Adelaide of Saxe-Meiningen (m. 1818–1837)	20 June 1837 Windsor Castle	26 June 1830 8 September 1831	20 June 1837 6 years, 359 days	Hanover	
Victoria; Alexandrina Victoria	An oil portrait of Queen Victoria sitting on a chair in a long coronation dress covering the chair and part of the floor. On a table behind her is the Imperial State Crown, and she is wearing an encrusted tiara.	A coat of arms that comprises a shield in four quadrants.	24 May 1819 Kensington Palace	Albert of Saxe-Coburg and Gotha (m. 1840; died 1861)	22 January 1901 Osborne House	20 June 1837 28 June 1838	22 January 1901 63 years, 216 days	Hanover	
Edward VII; Albert Edward	An oil portrait of Edward VII in his coronation robes and holding the sceptre in his right hand, the bottom of which is leaning on a table to his right. Sitting on that table is also the Imperial State Crown.	A coat of arms that comprises a shield in four quadrants.	9 November 1841 Buckingham Palace	Alexandra of Denmark (m. 1863–1910)	6 May 1910 Buckingham Palace	22 January 1901 9 August 1902	6 May 1910 9 years, 104 days	Saxe-Coburg and Gotha	
George V George Frederick Ernest Albert	An oil portrait of George V in his coronation robes, and holding a sword in his left hand. On a table to his left is the Imperial State Crown and the Orb.	A coat of arms that comprises a shield in four quadrants.	3 June 1865 Marlborough House	Mary of Teck (m. 1893–1936)	20 January 1936 Sandringham House	6 May 1910 22 June 1911	20 January 1936 25 years, 259 days	Saxe-Coburg and Gotha Windsor (Note: George V changed the name of the British royal house from 'Saxe-Coburg and Gotha' to 'Windsor' on 17 July 1917 because of anti-German sentiment caused by World War I. The change was designed to abandon any reference to the royal family's German descent, and replace it with 'Windsor' after the castle of the same name.)	
Edward VIII; Edward Albert Christian George; Andrew Patrick David		A coat of arms that comprises a shield in four quadrants.	23 June 1894 White Lodge	Wallis Simpson (m. 1937–1972)	28 May 1972 Villa Windsor	20 January 1936 — (Note: Edward VIII abdicated before his coronation.)	11 December 1936 (Note: The instrument of abdication was signed on 10 December, and given legislative form by His Majesty's Declaration of Abdication Act 1936 the following day. The parliament of the Union of South Africa retroactively approved the abdication with effect from 10 December, and the Irish Free State recognised the abdication on 12 December.) 326 days	Windsor	
George VI; Albert Frederick Arthur George	An oil portrait of George VI in purple coronation robes and holding the sceptre in his right hand. He is facing slightly rightwards, and away from the table to his left that holds the Imperial State Crown.	A coat of arms that comprises a shield in four quadrants.	14 December 1895 York Cottage	Elizabeth Bowes-Lyon (m. 1923–1952)	6 February 1952 Sandringham House	11 December 1936 12 May 1937	6 February 1952 15 years, 57 days	Windsor	
Elizabeth II; Elizabeth Alexandra Mary	An oil portrait of Queen Elizabeth II in a white dress and her coronation robes, which flow over a chair on her left which is engraved EɪɪR. Her right hand is touching the sceptre, which is resting on a table in front of the Imperial State Crown.	A coat of arms that comprises a shield in four quadrants.	21 April 1926 17 Bruton Street, Mayfair	Philip of Greece and Denmark (m. 1947; died 2021)	8 September 2022 Balmoral Castle	6 February 1952 2 June 1953	8 September 2022 70 years, 214 days	Windsor	
Charles III; Charles Philip Arthur George		A coat of arms that comprises a shield in four quadrants.	14 November 1948 Buckingham Palace	Diana Spencer (m. 1981; div. 1996)	—	8 September 2022 6 May 2023	— 4 years, 72 days (Note: From 8 September 2022 until now.)	Windsor	—
Charles III; Charles Philip Arthur George		A coat of arms that comprises a shield in four quadrants.	14 November 1948 Buckingham Palace	Camilla Parker Bowles (m. 2005)	—	8 September 2022 6 May 2023	— 4 years, 72 days	Windsor	—

== Timeline ==
The timeline of each British monarch's reign:

House of Stuart
House of Hanover
House of Saxe-Coburg and Gotha
House of Windsor
Anne (1707–1714)
George I (1714–1727)
George II (1727–1760)
George III (1760–1820)
George IV (1820–1830)
William IV (1830–1837)
Victoria (1837–1901)
Edward VII (1901–1910)
George V (1910–1936)
Edward VIII (1936)
George VI (1936–1952)
Elizabeth II (1952–2022)
Charles III (2022–present)
│
1700
│
1725
│
1750
│
1775
│
1800
│
1825
│
1850
│
1875
│
1900
│
1925
│
1950
│
1975
│
2000
│
2025
│
2050
│
2075
Monarchs of Great Britain and the United Kingdom, 1707–2026

== See also ==
- Family tree of the British royal family
- List of British royal consorts
- List of current British princes and princesses
- List of legendary kings of Britain
- List of monarchs in Britain by length of reign
- Lists of monarchs in the British Isles

== Notes ==
=== Sources ===
==== Web sources ====
- "Union of the Crowns". UK Parliament. Archived from the original on 25 October 2022.
- "Key Dates". UK Parliament. Archived from the original on 29 August 2025.
- "Queen Anne". Westminster Abbey. Archived from the original on 19 June 2025.
- "Elizabeth II". Westminster Abbey. Archived from the original on 10 August 2025.
- "About us". The Commonwealth. Archived from the original on 10 September 2022.
- "HM The King, Duke of Lancaster". Duchy of Lancaster. Archived from the original on 31 January 2026.
- "Crown Dependencies". The Royal Household. 4 June 2018. Archived from the original on 11 July 2021.
- "Anne (1665–1714)". BBC History. 2014. Archived from the original on 4 August 2025.
- "George III". Westminster Abbey. Archived from the original on 19 July 2025.
- "Charles III". Westminster Abbey. Archived from the original on 19 July 2025.

==== News sources ====
- Jones, Neil (16 January 2026). "Queen Anne and the Union of England and Scotland". Discover Britain. Archived from the original on 30 August 2025.
- "Scotland's Constitutional Crisis Three-Hundred Years Ago". BBC News. 31 July 2014. Archived from the original on 25 August 2025.
- "By the King – A Proclamation". The London Gazette. No. 38330. 22 June 1948.
- Tomlinson, Georgina (6 July 2017). "A New Name – Windsor". The Postal Museum. Archived from the original on 1 November 2025.
- "Timeline: Diana, Princess of Wales". BBC News. 5 July 2004. Archived from the original on 8 December 2008.

==== Book sources ====
- Croft, Pauline (2003). King James. Palgrave Macmillan. ISBN 978-0-3336-1395-5 – via Internet Archive.
- Willson, David Harris (1963) [1956]. King James VI & I. Jonathan Cape. OCLC 1035905077 – via Internet Archive.
- Green, David (1970). Queen Anne. HarperCollins. ISBN 0-0021-1693-6 – via Internet Archive.
- Weir, Alison (1996) [1989]. Britain's Royal Families: The Complete Genealogy (Pimlico ed.). Random House. ISBN 978-0-7126-7448-5 – via Internet Archive.
- Ziegler, Philip (1991). King Edward VIII: The Official Biography. Alfred A. Knopf. ISBN 0-394-57730-2 – via Internet Archive.
- Curtis, Gila (1972). The Life and Times of Queen Anne. Weidenfeld & Nicolson. ISBN 978-0-2979-9571-5 – via Internet Archive.
- Packard, Jerrold M. (1998). Victoria's Daughters. St. Martin's Press. ISBN 0-312-24496-7 – via Internet Archive.
- Knight, L. A. (1968). "The Royal Titles Act and India". The Historical Journal. XI (3). Cambridge University Press. doi:10.1017/S0018246X00001667 – via JSTOR.
- Heard, Andrew (1990). "Canadian Independence". Simon Fraser University. Archived from the original on 21 February 2009.
