= Sydney Johnson (valet) =

Valet to the Duke of Windsor and Mohamed Al-Fayed

Sydney Johnson (c. 1921/1923 – 17 January 1990) was a Bahamian-born personal attendant who notably served as the valet and footman to Prince Edward, Duke of Windsor, formerly King Edward VIII of the United Kingdom, and his wife, Wallis, Duchess of Windsor, for more than thirty years. He later worked for the Egyptian businessman Mohamed Al-Fayed.

== Life ==
Johnson was born on the island of Andros in the Bahamas; his birth year is variously reported as 1921 or 1923. At approximately age 16, Johnson was working as a beach attendant when he met the Duke of Windsor while the duke was serving as governor of the Bahamas during World War II, and began working as a footman for the duke and duchess. Following the war, he moved to Paris with the duke and duchess and was promoted to valet, and served them for over thirty years. While acting as personal valet to the duke, he would also wear a uniform and serve as a footman at formal dinners hosted by the duke and duchess. He married a French woman in 1960, with whom he had four children.

After the duke's death in 1972, Johnson was retained by the duchess. Johnson was one of a limited number of attendees at the funeral service of the Duke of Windsor on 5 June 1972. Johnson's wife died around 1972, shortly after the death of the duke. Johnson left the duchess's service in 1973 to care for his children, reports differing if he resigned or was dismissed. Johnson was later reportedly employed by Lady Glover, the wife of Douglas Glover.

Johnson was working as a waiter at the Hôtel Ritz Paris when it was purchased by Mohamed Al-Fayed in 1979. Al-Fayed was impressed by Johnson's knowledge of British high society and the royal family, and hired Johnson as his personal valet. During subsequent years, he worked with Al-Fayed during the restoration of Villa Windsor and served as curator of the collections.

Johnson died suddenly on 17 January 1990 in Paris, the cause not being publicly known. On his death, he was described by Al-Fayed as "truly a gentleman's gentleman".

== In fiction ==
In the Netflix television series The Crown (2022), Johnson was portrayed by Zimbabwe-born actor Connie M'Gadzah in a brief appearance during season 3. Johnson was the focus of the season 5 episode "Mou Mou", which depicts his relationships with the Duke of Windsor and Mohamed Al-Fayed, and was portrayed by Nigerian actor Jude Akuwudike, while a younger version was portrayed by Joshua Kekana.
