= Hélène Bricka =

French governess and tutor (1847–1914)

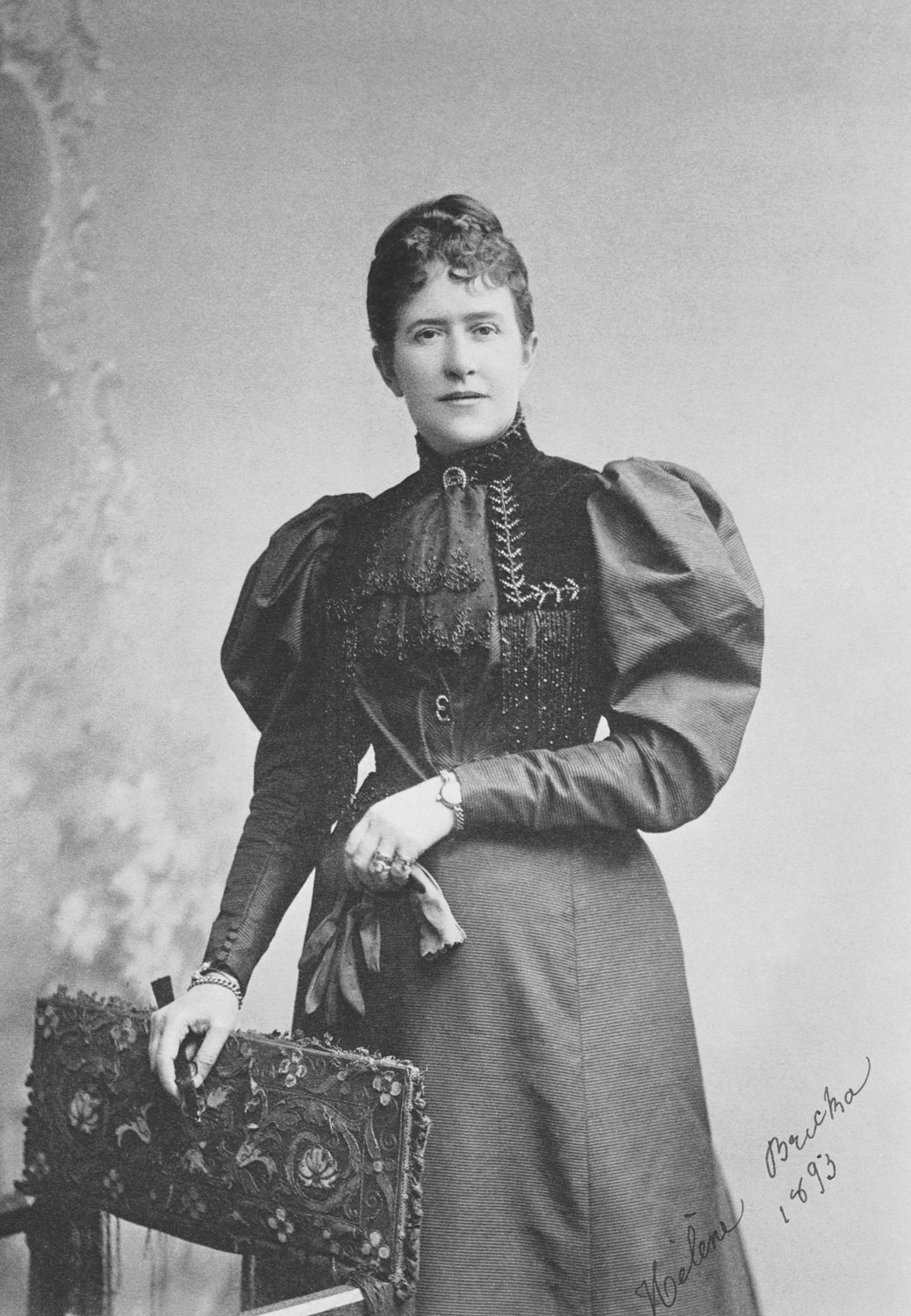
- Bricka, photographed in 1893
- Born: c. 1847; Alsace, France
- Died: 15 September 1914 (aged 66–67); West Brompton, London, England
- Occupations: Governess, tutor, reader
- Employer(s): Teck family; British royal family
- Known for: Governess to Mary of Teck

Hélène Bricka (c. 1847 – 15 September 1914) was a French governess and tutor who served in the household of the Duchess of Teck and became an influential figure in the education of Princess Victoria Mary of Teck, later Queen Mary.

== Early life ==
Bricka was born in Alsace around 1847 and came from a family of four sisters. Although she had no formal higher education, she was described as a "born educationalist" with wide reading in French, German and English and a strong interest in modern history and social questions.

== Employment ==
Bricka entered the service of the Teck household in the mid-1880s, initially working as a reader and educational assistant to the Duchess of Teck. She soon became governess to Princess Victoria Mary ("May"), later Queen Mary, at White Lodge in Richmond Park.

According to James Pope-Hennessy, Bricka assumed control of Princess Mary's education after earlier tutors, introducing a more modern curriculum. This included literature, modern European history, and attention to contemporary social and industrial conditions, including government reports on labour and poverty.

Bricka lived as a permanent member of the household at White Lodge, Richmond Park, where she became closely integrated into daily family life. She also served as a companion-secretary to the Duchess of Teck after Princess Mary's marriage to Prince George, Duke of York in 1893, assisting with correspondence and household duties.

She is also recorded as having assisted in the early education of Queen Mary's children, including teaching French to the future Edward VIII.

Bricka's role extended beyond formal instruction. She is described in contemporary accounts as a close confidante to Queen Mary, with whom she regularly exchanged personal letters in French.

== Later life ==
In later life, Bricka retired from active household service and moved to lodgings in Pimlico, London. Her health declined in the years leading up to her death, and she gradually withdrew from royal household life while remaining personally remembered by Queen Mary.

She died on 15 September 1914 in West Brompton after a prolonged illness. Her death was noted in correspondence from Queen Mary, who wrote to her aunt, the Dowager Grand Duchess of Mecklenburg-Strelitz, expressing sorrow at her passing and describing it as the loss of "another landmark gone".

== Legacy ==
Bricka is remembered primarily through royal correspondence and James Pope-Hennessy's biography of Queen Mary. She is regarded as an important intellectual influence on Queen Mary during her formative years, particularly in broadening her education beyond traditional aristocratic instruction.

Her career illustrates the role of governesses and private tutors in shaping the education of European royalty in the late 19th century, particularly within the household of the Teck family at White Lodge.
