= List of prime ministers of Edward VIII =

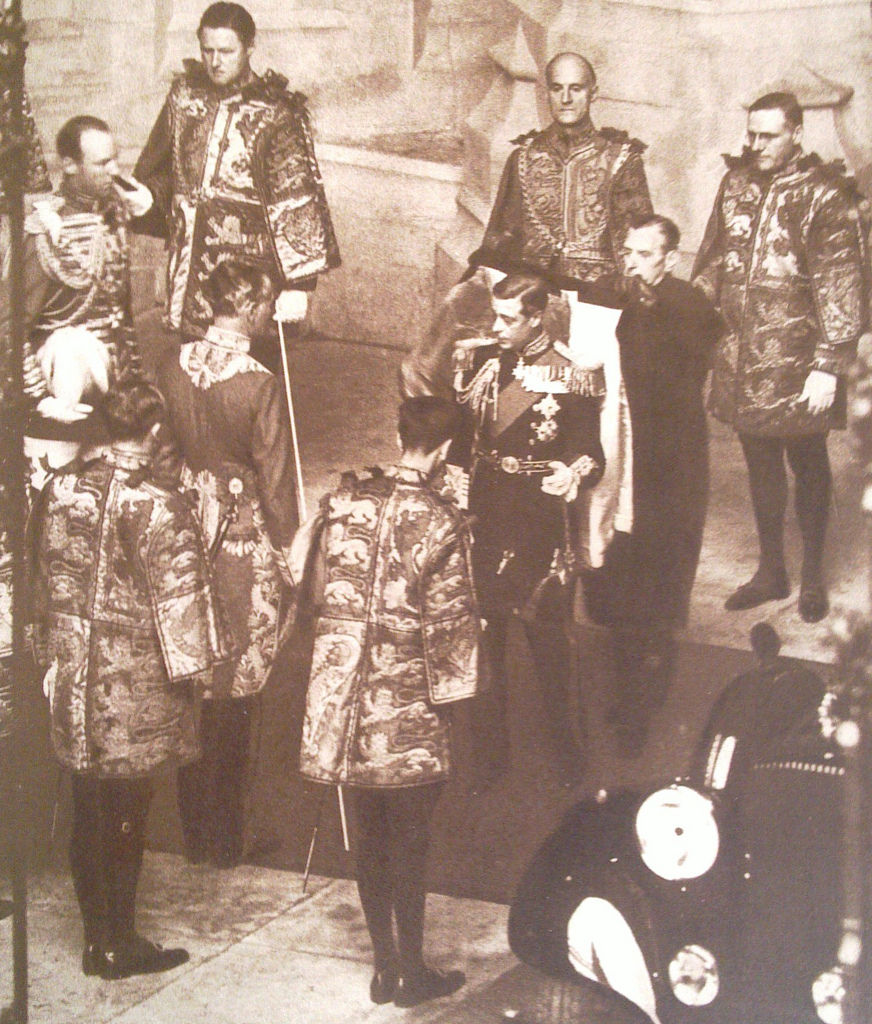
Edward VIII surrounded by heralds of the College of Arms prior to his only State Opening of Parliament in November 1936

King Edward VIII was the King of the United Kingdom and the Dominions and colonies of the British Commonwealth, and Emperor of India from 20 January to 11 December 1936, when he abdicated the throne.

During his reign Edward was served by eight prime ministers; one each from the United Kingdom, Australia, Canada, the Irish Free State, New Zealand, Northern Ireland, South Africa, and Southern Rhodesia. Edward's short reign saw no changes in the occupancy of any of these offices.

Stanley Baldwin was the United Kingdom prime minister during the abdication of Edward VIII.

== Prime ministers ==
Portrait	Name (Birth–Death)	Term of office		Country
	Joseph Lyons (1879–1939)	6 January 1932	7 April 1939	Australia
	William Lyon Mackenzie King (1874–1950)	23 October 1935	15 November 1948	Canada
	Éamon de Valera (1882–1975)	9 March 1932	29 December 1937	Irish Free State
	Michael Joseph Savage (1872–1940)	6 December 1935	27 March 1940	New Zealand
	The Viscount Craigavon (1871–1940)	7 June 1921	24 November 1940	Northern Ireland
	J. B. M. Hertzog (1866–1942)	30 June 1924	5 September 1939	South Africa
	Godfrey Huggins (1883–1971)	12 September 1933	7 September 1953	Southern Rhodesia
	Stanley Baldwin (1867–1947)	7 June 1935	28 May 1937	United Kingdom

== See also ==
- British Empire
- Constitutional monarchy
- Commonwealth of Nations
- Dominion
