= Edward VIII =

King of the United Kingdom in 1936

- Duke of Windsor
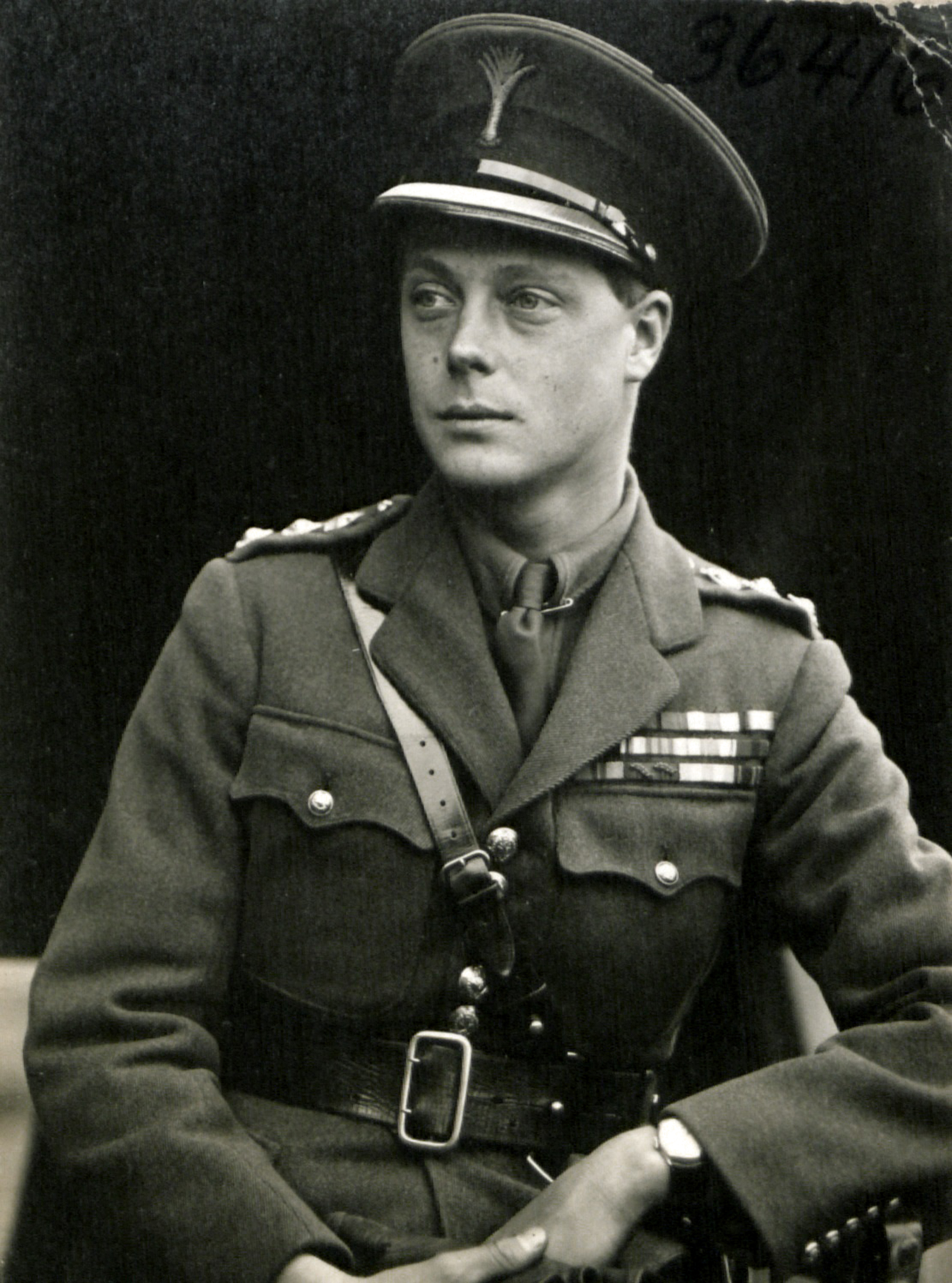
- Edward as Colonel of the Welsh Guards in 1919

King of the United Kingdom and the British Dominions; Emperor of India
- Reign: 20 January – 11 December 1936 (Note: The instrument of abdication was signed on 10 December, and given legislative form by His Majesty's Declaration of Abdication Act 1936 the following day. The parliament of the Union of South Africa retroactively approved the abdication with effect from 10 December, and the Irish Free State recognised the abdication on 12 December.)
- Predecessor: George V
- Successor: George VI
- Born: Prince Edward of York; 23 June 1894; White Lodge, Richmond Park, Surrey, England
- Died: 28 May 1972 (aged 77); 4 route du Champ d'Entraînement, Paris, France
- Burial: 5 June 1972; Royal Burial Ground, Frogmore, Windsor, Berkshire
- Spouse: Wallis Simpson (m. 1937)
Names
- Edward Albert Christian George Andrew Patrick David
- House: Saxe-Coburg and Gotha (until 1917); Windsor (from 1917)
- Father: George V
- Mother: Mary of Teck
- Religion: Protestant (Note: As monarch, Edward was Supreme Governor of the Church of England and a member of the Church of Scotland.)
- Education: Royal Naval College, Osborne; Britannia Royal Naval College; Magdalen College, Oxford
- Military career
- Allegiance: United Kingdom
- Branch: Royal Navy; British Army; Royal Air Force
- Rank
- Awards: Military Cross
- Edward VIII's voice Edward's abdication speech Recorded 11 December 1936

Edward VIII (Edward Albert Christian George Andrew Patrick David; 23 June 1894 – 28 May 1972), later known as the Duke of Windsor, was King of the United Kingdom and the British Dominions, and Emperor of India, from 20 January 1936 until his abdication in December of the same year.

Edward was born during the reign of his great-grandmother Queen Victoria as the eldest child of the Duke and Duchess of York, later King George V and Queen Mary. He was created Prince of Wales on his 16th birthday, seven weeks after his father succeeded as king. As a young man, Edward served in the British Army during the First World War and undertook several overseas tours on behalf of his father. The Prince of Wales gained popularity due to his charm and charisma, and his fashion sense became a hallmark of the era. After the war, his conduct began to give cause for concern; he engaged in a series of sexual affairs that worried both his father and the British prime minister, Stanley Baldwin.

Upon his father's death in 1936, Edward became the second monarch of the House of Windsor. The new king showed impatience with court protocol, and caused consternation among politicians by his apparent disregard for established constitutional conventions. Only months into his reign, Edward caused a constitutional crisis through his proposal to marry Wallis Simpson, an American who had divorced her first husband and was seeking a divorce from her second. The prime ministers of the United Kingdom and the Dominions opposed the marriage, arguing a divorced woman with two living ex-husbands was politically and socially unacceptable as a prospective queen consort. Additionally, such a marriage would have conflicted with Edward's status as titular head of the Church of England, which, at the time, disapproved of remarriage after divorce if a former spouse was still alive. Edward knew the Baldwin government would resign if the marriage went ahead, which could have forced a general election and would have ruined his status as a politically neutral constitutional monarch. When it became apparent he could not marry Simpson and remain on the throne, he abdicated. He was succeeded by his younger brother, George VI. With a reign of 326 days, Edward was one of the shortest-reigning British monarchs to date, and is the most recent British monarch to abdicate.

After his abdication, Edward was created Duke of Windsor. After Simpson's second divorce became final, she married Edward in France in June 1937; they had no children. Later that year, the couple toured Nazi Germany, which fed rumours that he was a Nazi sympathiser. During the Second World War, Edward was at first stationed with the British Military Mission to France. After the fall of France, he was appointed Governor of the Bahamas. After the war, Edward stayed in France until his death in 1972.

== Early life ==
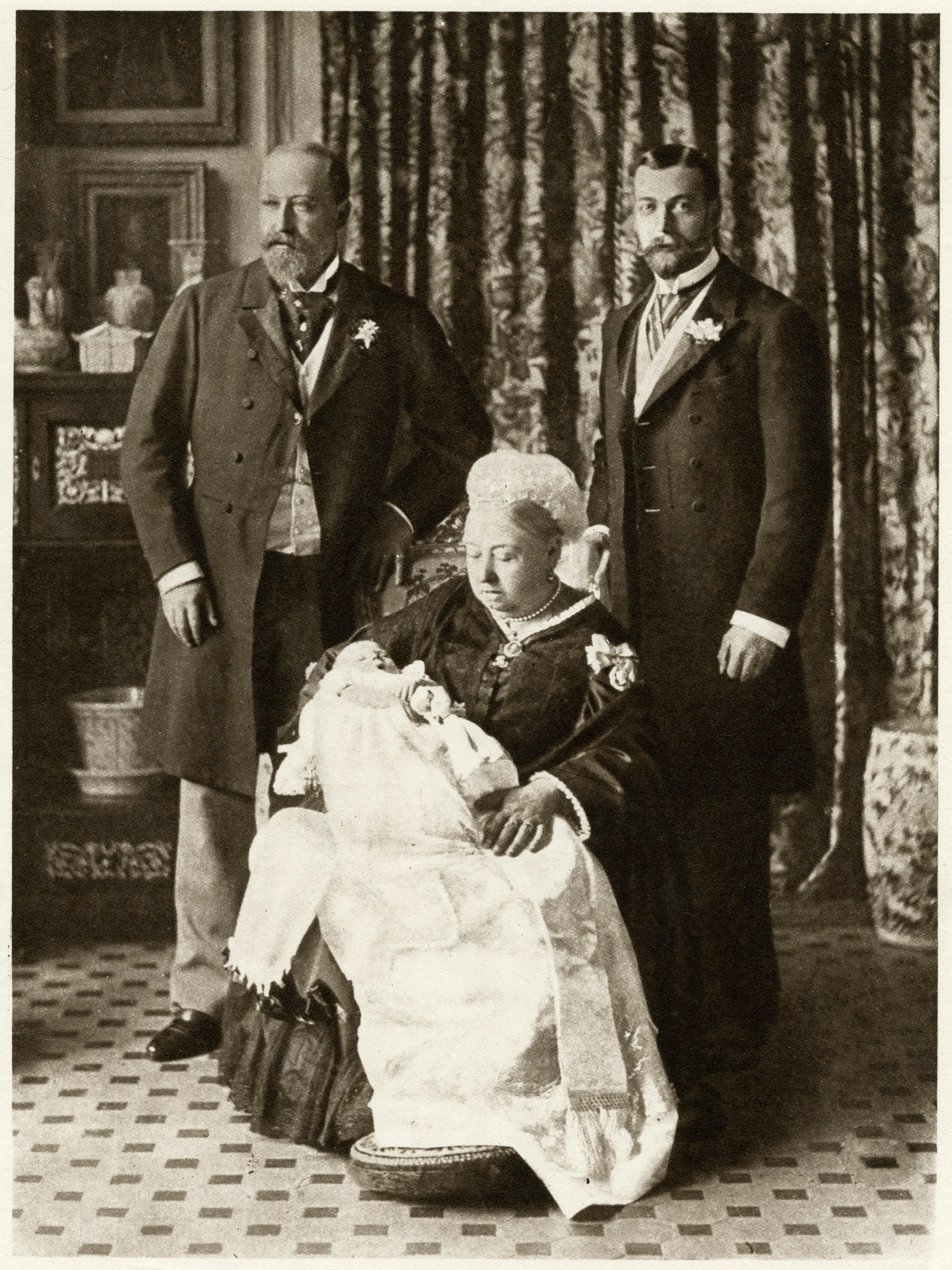
Edward with his father George, grandfather Edward, and great-grandmother Victoria

Edward was born at 10:00 pm on 23 June 1894 at White Lodge, Richmond Park, on the outskirts of London, during the reign of his great-grandmother, Queen Victoria. He was the eldest son of the Duke and Duchess of York (later King George V and Queen Mary). His father was the son of the Prince and Princess of Wales (later King Edward VII and Queen Alexandra) and his mother was the eldest daughter of Princess Mary Adelaide of Cambridge and Francis, Duke of Teck. At the time of his birth, he was third in the line of succession to the throne, behind his grandfather and father.

Edward was baptised Edward Albert Christian George Andrew Patrick David in the Green Drawing Room of White Lodge on 16 July by Edward White Benson, Archbishop of Canterbury. (Note: His twelve godparents were: the Queen of the United Kingdom (his paternal great-grandmother); the King and Queen of Denmark (his paternal great-grandparents, for whom his maternal uncle Prince Adolphus of Teck and his paternal aunt the Duchess of Fife stood proxy); the King of Württemberg (his mother's distant cousin, for whom his granduncle the Duke of Connaught stood proxy); the Queen of Greece (his grandaunt, for whom his paternal aunt Princess Victoria of Wales stood proxy); the Duke of Saxe-Coburg and Gotha (his grand uncle, for whom Prince Louis of Battenberg stood proxy); the Prince and Princess of Wales (his paternal grandparents); the Tsarevich (his father's cousin); the Duke of Cambridge (his maternal granduncle and Queen Victoria's cousin); and the Duke and Duchess of Teck (his maternal grandparents).) The name Edward was chosen in honour of Edward's late uncle Prince Albert Victor, Duke of Clarence and Avondale, who was known within the family as "Eddy" (Edward being among his given names); Albert was included at the behest of Queen Victoria for her late husband Albert, Prince Consort; Christian was in honour of his great-grandfather King Christian IX of Denmark; and the last four names – George, Andrew, Patrick and David – came from, respectively, the patron saints of England, Scotland, Ireland and Wales. He was always known to his family and close friends by his last given name, David.

As was common practice among upper-class families of the period, Edward and his younger siblings were brought up by nannies rather than directly by their parents. One of Edward's early nannies frequently mistreated him by pinching him before he was due to be presented to his parents. His resulting crying and distress would prompt the Duke and Duchess to send him and the nanny away. Her behaviour was eventually discovered, and she was dismissed and replaced by Charlotte Bill.

Edward's father, though a harsh disciplinarian, was demonstratively affectionate, and his mother displayed a playful side with her children that belied her austere public image. She was amused by the children making tadpoles on toast for their French master as a prank, and encouraged them to confide in her.

== Education ==
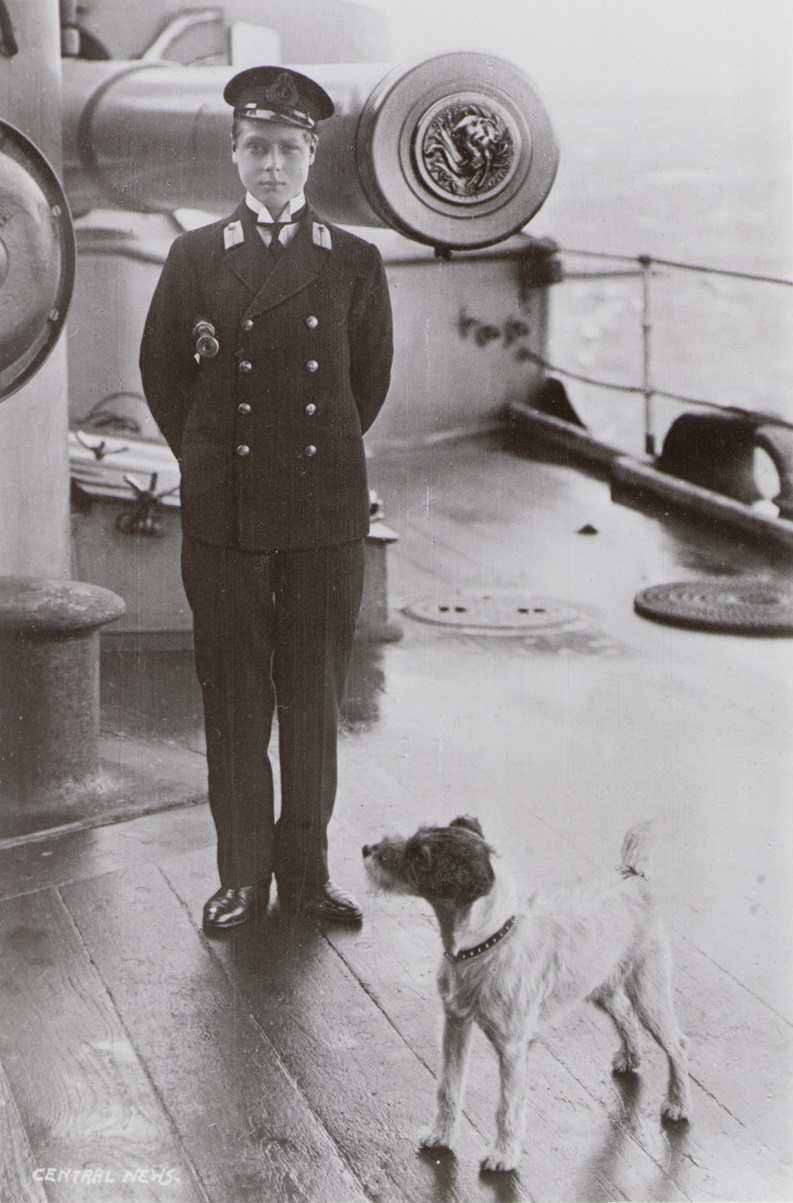
As a midshipman on board HMS Hindustan, 1911

Initially, Edward was tutored at home by Hélène Bricka. When his parents travelled the British Empire for almost nine months following the death of Queen Victoria in 1901, Edward and his siblings remained in Britain with their grandparents, Queen Alexandra and King Edward VII, who showered them with affection. Upon his parents' return, Edward was placed under the care of two men, Frederick Finch and Henry Hansell, who virtually brought up Edward and his siblings for the rest of their nursery years.

Edward stayed under Hansell's strict tutorship until he was almost 13. Private tutors taught him German and French. He took the examination for entry to the Royal Naval College, Osborne, and began there in 1907. Hansell had wanted Edward to enter school earlier, but the prince's father disagreed. After two years at Osborne College, which he did not enjoy, Edward moved on to the Royal Naval College at Dartmouth. A two-year course, followed by entry into the Royal Navy, was planned.

Upon the death of Edward VII, Edward's father ascended the throne as George V, and Edward himself became heir apparent. Preparations for his future as king began in earnest. He was withdrawn from his naval course before his formal graduation, served as a midshipman for three months aboard the battleship Hindustan, and then immediately entered Magdalen College, Oxford, for which, in the opinion of his biographers, he was intellectually unprepared. A keen horseman, he learned to play polo with the university club. He left Oxford after eight terms, without any academic qualifications.

== Prince of Wales ==
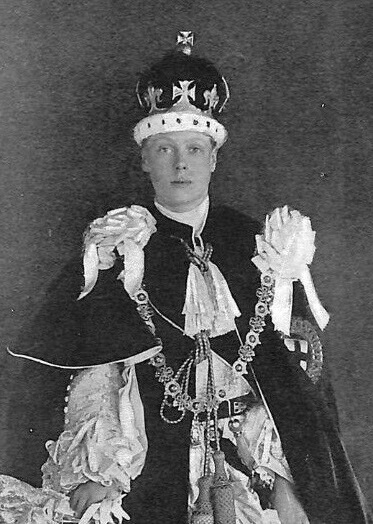
As Prince of Wales, 1911

Edward automatically became Duke of Cornwall and Duke of Rothesay on 6 May 1910 upon his father's accession. He was created, by letters patent, Prince of Wales and Earl of Chester a month later, on 23 June 1910, his 16th birthday. Edward was officially invested as Prince of Wales in a special ceremony at Caernarfon Castle on 13 July 1911. The investiture took place in Wales at the instigation of the Welsh politician David Lloyd George, Constable of the Castle and Chancellor of the Exchequer in the Liberal government. Lloyd George devised a rather fanciful ceremony in the style of a Welsh pageant and coached Edward to speak a few words in Welsh.

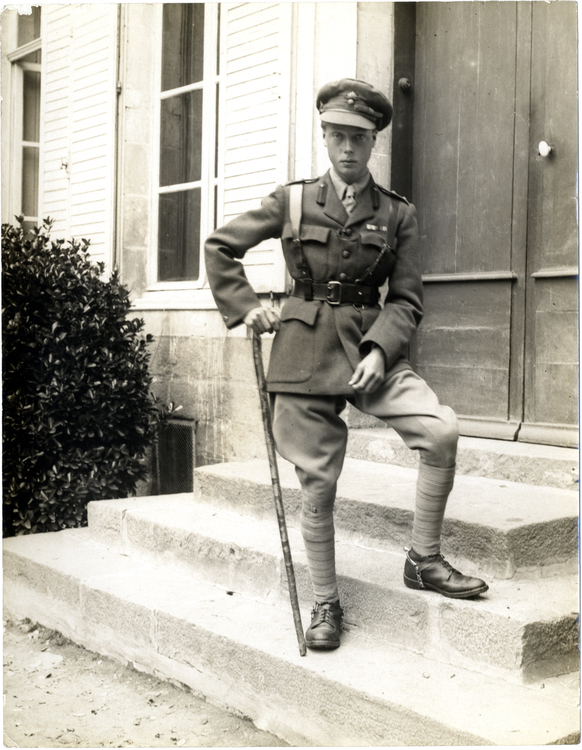
In August 1915, during the First World War

When the First World War broke out in 1914, Edward had reached the minimum age for active service and was keen to participate. He had joined the Grenadier Guards in June 1914, and although he was willing to serve on the front lines, the Secretary of State for War, Lord Kitchener, refused to allow it, citing the immense harm that would occur if the heir apparent to the throne were captured by the enemy. Edward visited frontline trenches several times, for which he was awarded the Military Cross in 1916. His role in the war, although limited, made him popular among veterans of the conflict. He undertook his first military flight in 1918 and later gained a pilot's licence.

Edward's youngest brother, Prince John, died on 18 January 1919, aged 13, after a severe epileptic seizure. Edward, who was eleven years older than John and had hardly known him, saw his death as "little more than a regrettable nuisance". He wrote to his mistress of the time that "[he had] told [her] all about that little brother, and how he was an epileptic. [John]'s been practically shut up for the last two years anyhow, so no one has ever seen him except the family, and then only once or twice a year. This poor boy had become more of an animal than anything else." He also wrote an insensitive letter to his mother, which has since been lost. She did not reply, but he felt compelled to write her an apology, in which he stated: "I feel such a cold hearted and unsympathetic swine for writing all that I did ... No one can realize more than you how little poor Johnnie meant to me who hardly knew him ... I feel so much for you, darling Mama, who was his mother."

In 1919, Edward agreed to serve as president of the organising committee for the proposed British Empire Exhibition at Wembley Park, Middlesex. He wished the Exhibition to include "a great national sports ground", and so played a part in the creation of Wembley Stadium.

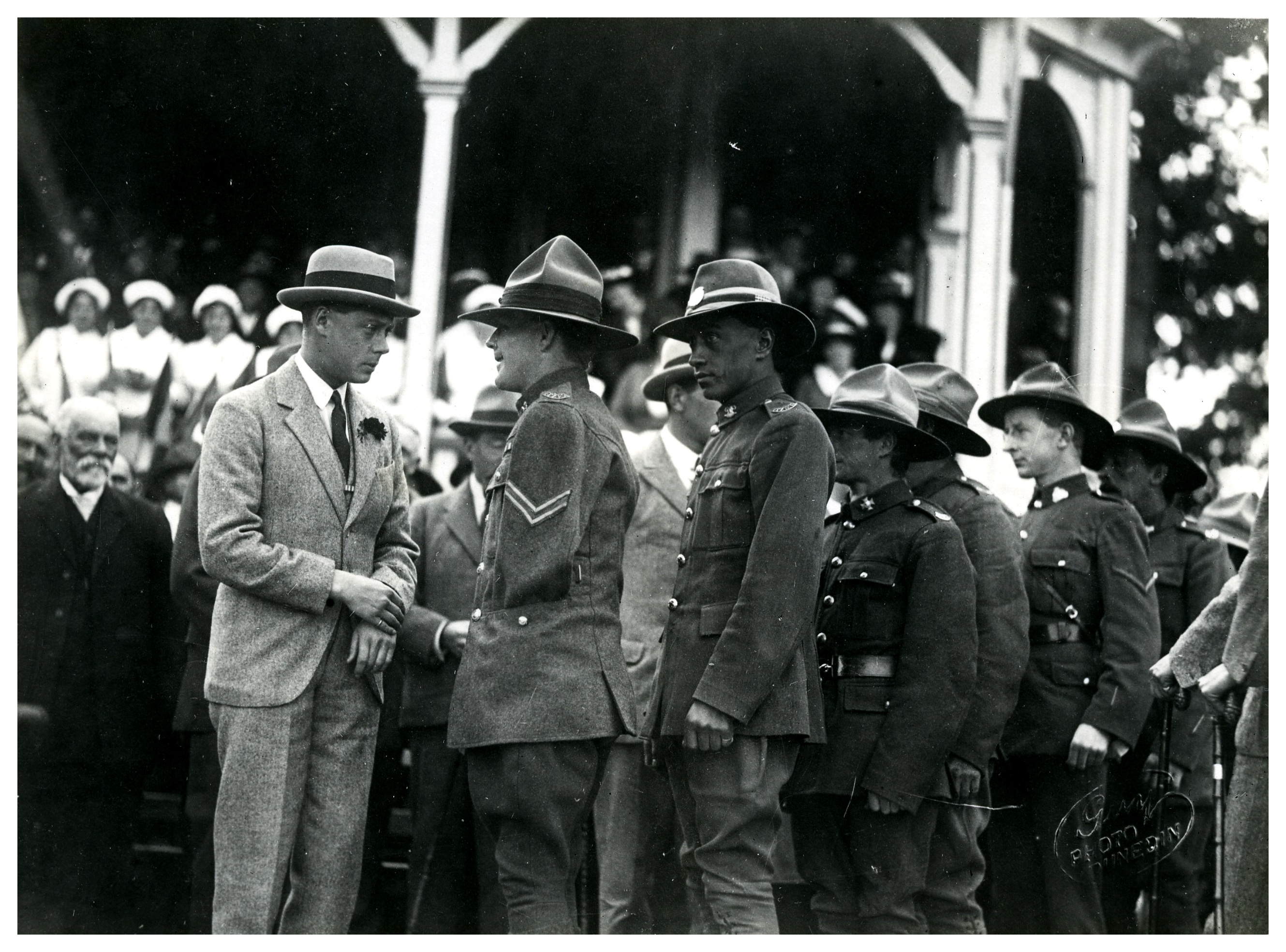
In Ashburton, New Zealand, with returned servicemen, 1920

Throughout the 1920s, Edward, as Prince of Wales, represented his father at home and overseas on many occasions. His rank, travels, good looks, and unmarried status attracted considerable public attention. At the height of his popularity, he was the most photographed celebrity of his time, and he set men's fashion. During his 1924 visit to the United States, Men's Wear magazine observed that, "The average young man in America is more interested in the clothes of the Prince of Wales than in any other individual on earth."

Edward visited poverty-stricken areas of Britain, and undertook sixteen tours to various parts of the Empire between 1919 and 1935. On a tour of Canada in 1919, he acquired the Bedingfield ranch near Pekisko, Alberta, which he owned until 1962. Named the E. P. Ranch (for Edward, Prince), he attempted unsuccessfully to develop it for the breeding of animals, including Shorthorn cattle, Dartmoor ponies, and Clydesdale horses.

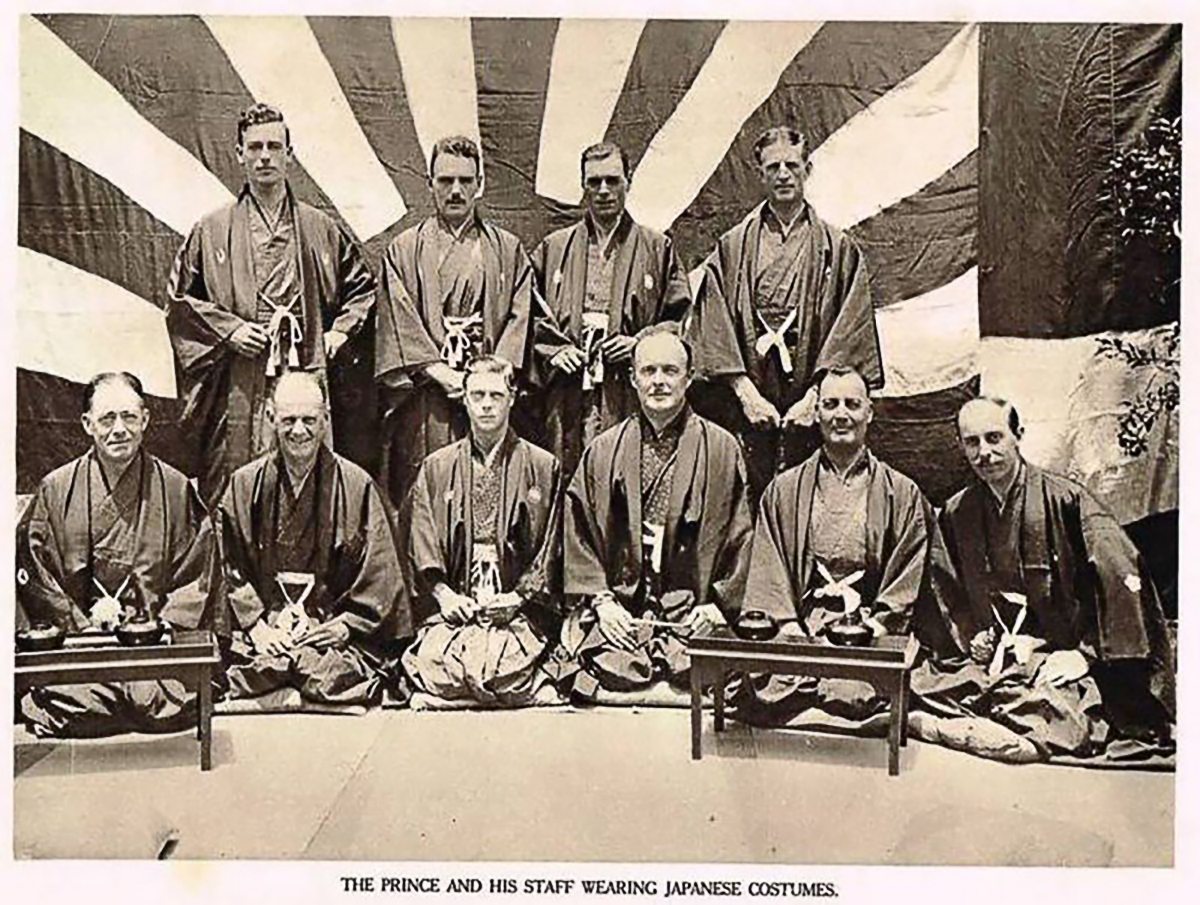
Edward and his staff wearing formal samurai kimono in Japan, 1922

Edward's November 1921 visit to India came during the non-cooperation movement protests for Indian self-rule and was marked by riots in Bombay. In 1929, Sir Alexander Leith, a leading Conservative in the north of England, persuaded him to make a three-day visit to the County Durham and Northumberland coalfields, where there was widespread unemployment. From January to April 1931, the Prince of Wales and his brother Prince George travelled 18,000 miles (29,000 km) on a tour of South America, steaming out on the ocean liner Oropesa, and returning via Paris and an Imperial Airways flight from Paris–Le Bourget Airport that landed specially in Windsor Great Park.

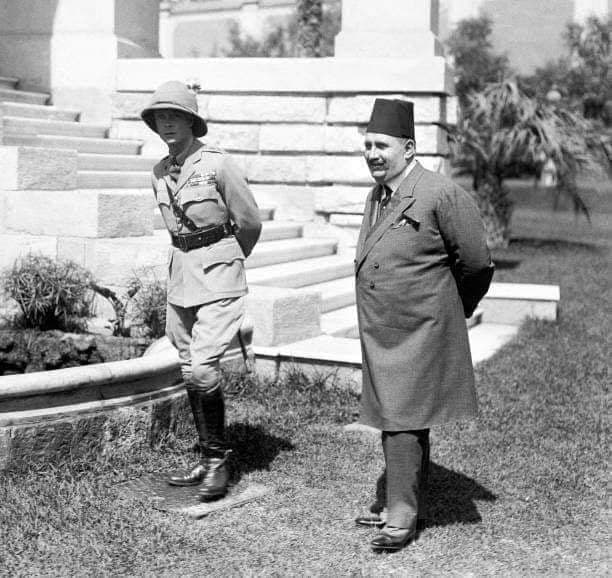
With King Fuad I of Egypt in Abdeen Palace garden, 1932

Though widely travelled, Edward shared a then-common racial prejudice against foreigners and many of the Empire's subjects, believing that whites were inherently superior. In 1920, during his visit to Australia, he wrote of Indigenous Australians: "they are the most revolting form of living creatures I've ever seen!! They are the lowest known form of human beings & are the nearest thing to monkeys."

== Romances ==
Before the First World War, a royal match between Edward and his second cousin, Princess Victoria Louise of Prussia, was suggested. Nothing came of it, and Victoria Louise married Edward's first cousin once removed, Ernest Augustus, Duke of Brunswick. In 1934, Adolf Hitler, seeking to forge a link between the British and German royal houses, asked Victoria Louise to arrange a marriage between the 40-year-old Edward and her 17-year-old daughter, Frederica of Hanover, who was then at boarding school in England. Her parents refused, citing the age gap, and Frederica later married Paul of Greece.

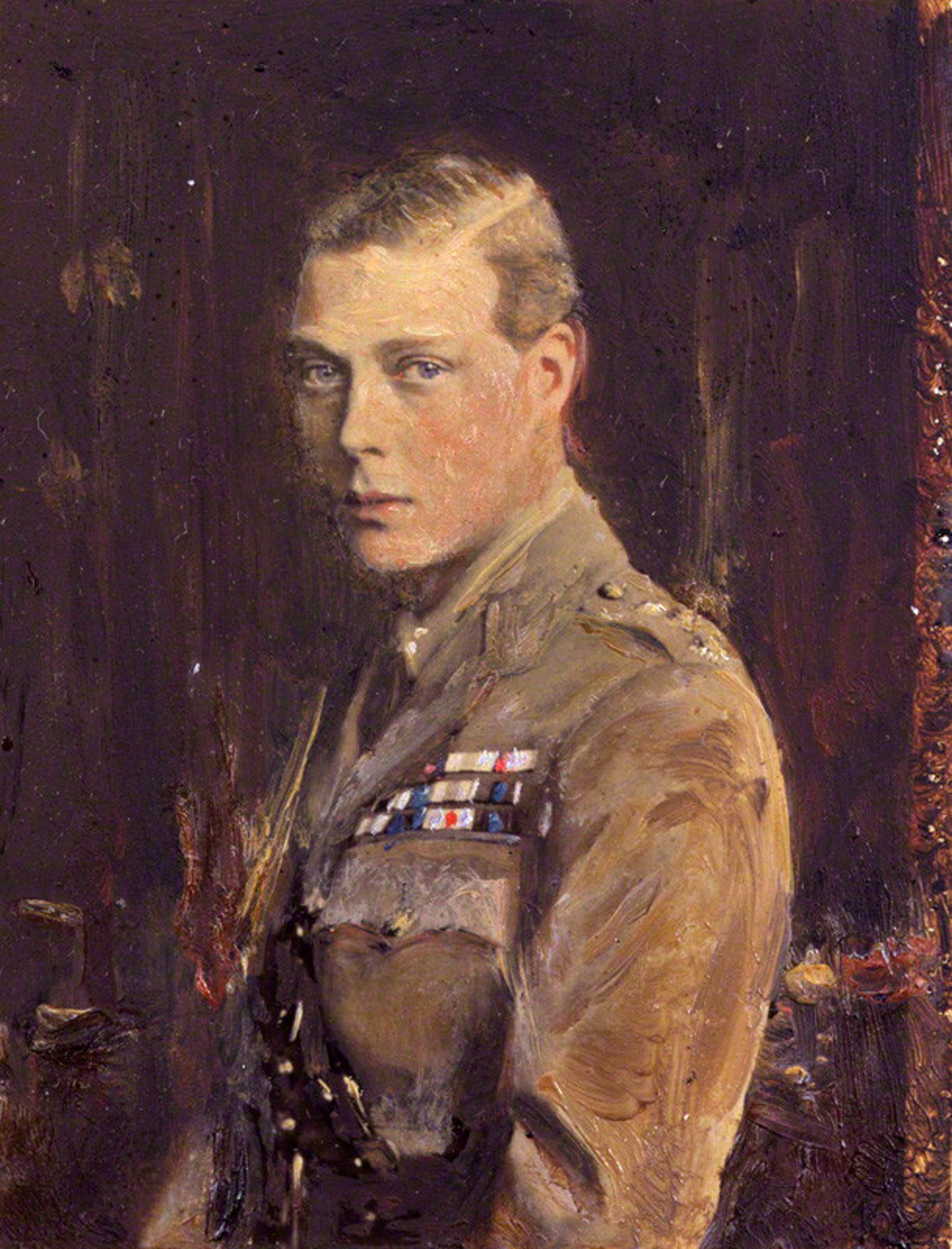
Portrait by Reginald Eves, c. 1920

By 1917, Edward liked to spend time partying in Paris while on leave from his regiment on the Western Front. He was introduced to Parisian courtesan Marguerite Alibert, with whom he became infatuated. He wrote her candid letters, which she kept. After about a year, Edward ended the affair. In 1923, Alibert was acquitted in a spectacular murder trial after she shot her husband at the Savoy Hotel. Desperate efforts were made by the Royal Household to ensure that Edward's name was not mentioned in connection with the trial or Alibert.

Also in 1917, Edward began a relationship with Lady Rosemary Leveson-Gower, the youngest daughter of the 4th Duke of Sutherland. According to Leveson-Gower's friends, Edward proposed to her, but the relationship ended when the King and Queen expressed their disapproval of certain relatives of hers, namely Daisy, Countess of Warwick, a maternal aunt, and the 5th Earl of Rosslyn, a maternal uncle.

Edward's womanising and reckless behaviour during the 1920s and 1930s worried Prime Minister Stanley Baldwin, King George V, and those close to the prince. The King was disappointed by his son's failure to settle down, disgusted by his affairs with married women, and reluctant to see him inherit the Crown. "After I am dead", George said, "the boy will ruin himself in twelve months."

George V favoured his second son Albert ("Bertie") and Albert's daughter Elizabeth ("Lilibet"), later King George VI and Queen Elizabeth II. He told a courtier, "I pray to God that my eldest son will never marry and have children, and that nothing will come between Bertie and Lilibet and the throne." In 1929, Time magazine reported that Edward teased Albert's wife, also named Elizabeth (later the Queen Mother), by calling her "Queen Elizabeth". The magazine asked whether "she did not sometimes wonder how much truth there is in the story that he once said he would renounce his rights upon the death of George V – which would make her nickname come true".

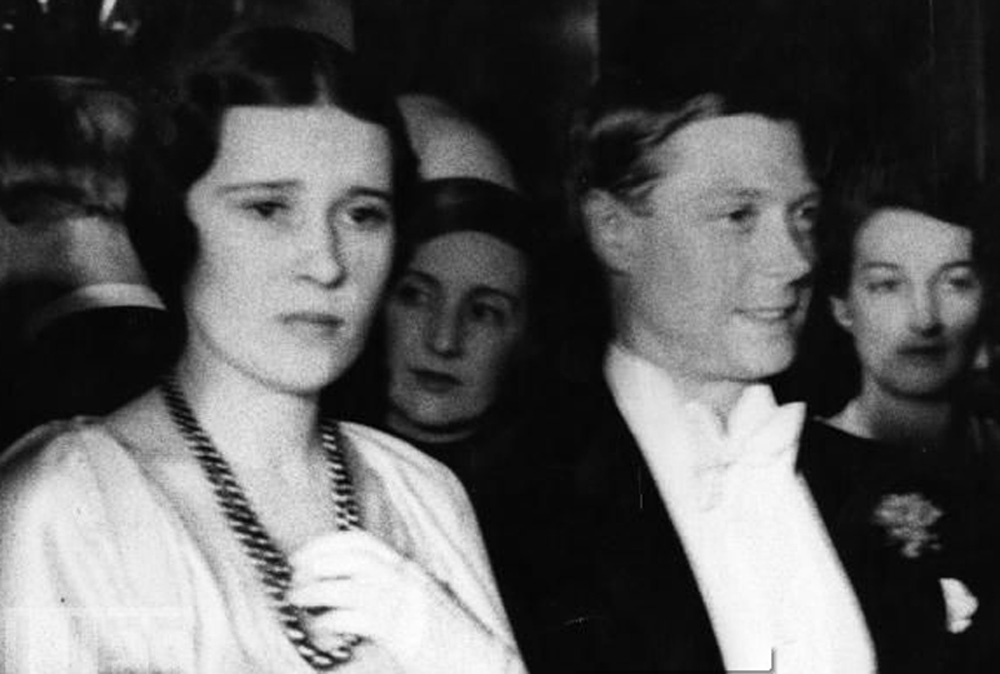
With Thelma Furness, 1932

In 1930, the King gave Edward the lease of Fort Belvedere in Windsor Great Park. There, he continued his relationships with a series of married women, including Freda Dudley Ward and Lady Furness, the American wife of a British peer, who introduced him to her friend and fellow American Wallis Simpson. Simpson had divorced her first husband, U.S. Navy officer Win Spencer, in 1927. Her second husband, Ernest Simpson, was a British-American businessman. Wallis Simpson and the Prince of Wales, it is generally accepted, became lovers while Lady Furness was travelling abroad, although Edward adamantly insisted to his father that he was not having an affair with her and that it was not appropriate to describe her as his mistress. Edward's relationship with Simpson, however, further strained his already poor relationship with his father. Although his parents met Simpson at Buckingham Palace in 1935, they later refused to receive her.

Edward's affair with the latter caused such grave concern that the couple were followed by members of the Metropolitan Police Special Branch, who examined in secret the nature of their relationship. An undated report detailed a visit by the couple to an antique shop, where the proprietor later noted that "the lady seemed to have POW [Prince of Wales] completely under her thumb." The prospect of having an American divorcée with a questionable past exerting such influence over the heir apparent led to anxiety among government and establishment figures.

== Reign ==
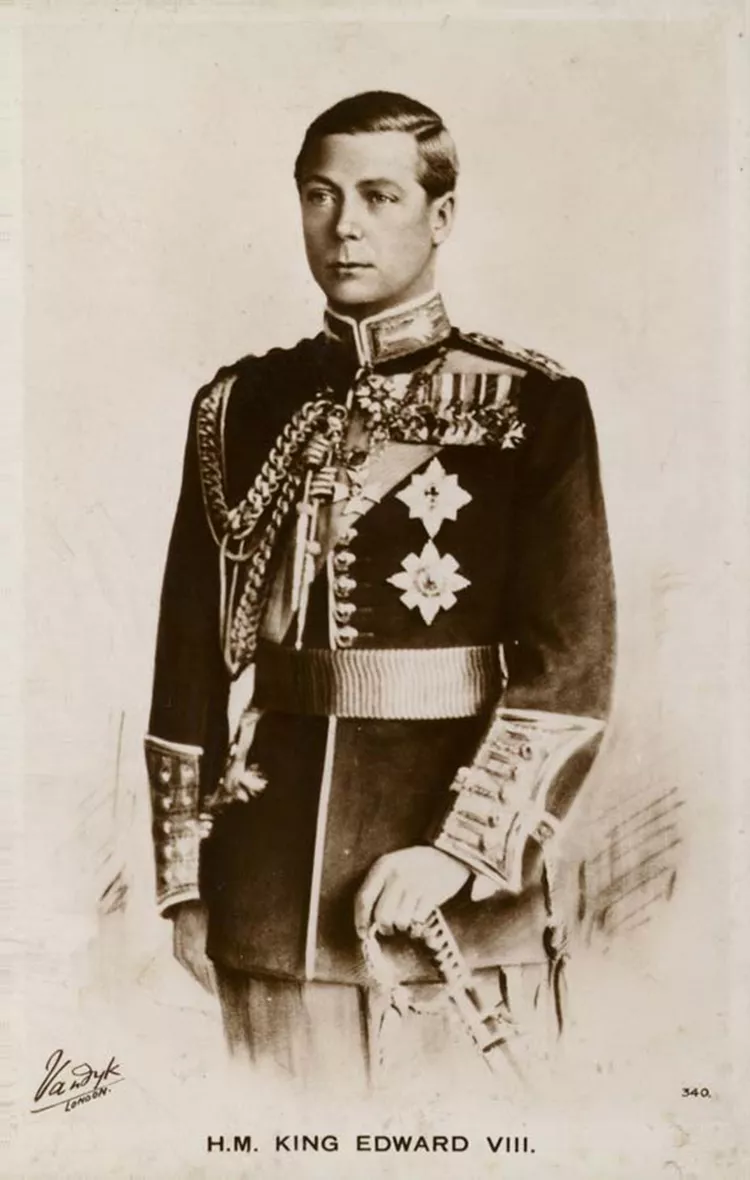
Portrait as king, 1936

George V died on 20 January 1936, and Edward ascended the throne as Edward VIII. The next day, accompanied by Simpson, he broke with custom by watching the proclamation of his own accession from a window of St James's Palace. He became the first monarch of the British Empire to fly in an aircraft when he travelled from Sandringham to London for his Accession Council.

Edward caused unease in government circles with actions that were interpreted as interference in political matters. His comment during a tour of depressed villages in South Wales that "something must be done" for the unemployed coal miners was seen as an attempt to guide government policy, though he had proposed no remedy or change in policy. Government ministers were reluctant to send confidential documents and state papers to Fort Belvedere because it was clear that Edward was paying little attention to them, and it was feared that Simpson and other house guests might read them, improperly or inadvertently revealing government secrets.

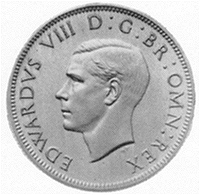
Left-facing coinage portrait of Edward VIII

Edward's unorthodox approach to his role also extended to the coinage that bore his image. He broke with the tradition that the profile portrait of each successive monarch faced in the direction opposite to that of their predecessor. Edward insisted that he face left (as his father had done), to show the parting in his hair. Only a handful of test coins were struck before the abdication, and all are very rare. When George VI succeeded to the throne, he also faced left to maintain the tradition by suggesting that, had any further coins been minted featuring Edward's portrait, they would have shown him facing right.

On 16 July 1936, George Andrew McMahon produced a loaded revolver as Edward rode on horseback at Constitution Hill, near Buckingham Palace. Police spotted the weapon and pounced on him; he was quickly arrested. McMahon alleged at his trial that "a foreign power" had approached him to kill Edward, that he had informed MI5 of the plan, and that he was merely seeing the plan through to help MI5 catch the real culprits. The court rejected the claims and sentenced him to a year in prison for "intent to alarm". It is now thought that McMahon had indeed been in contact with MI5, but the veracity of the remainder of his claims remains debatable.

In August and September, Edward and Simpson cruised the Eastern Mediterranean on the steam yacht Nahlin. By October, it was becoming clear that the new king planned to marry Simpson, particularly when divorce proceedings between the Simpsons were brought at Ipswich Assizes. Although gossip about his affair was widespread in the United States, the British media kept silent voluntarily, and the general public knew nothing until early December.

== Abdication ==
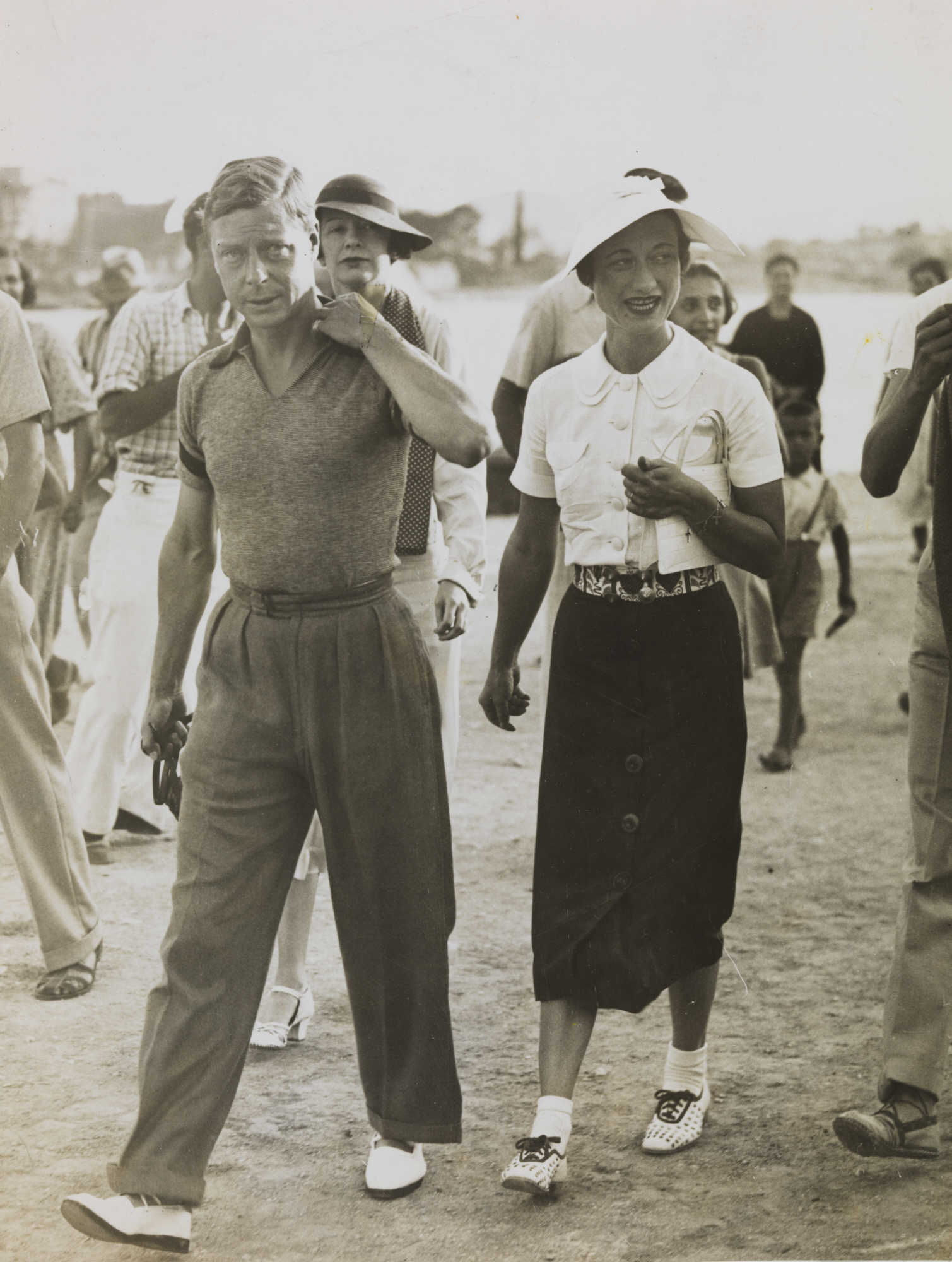
With Wallis Simpson on their holiday in Yugoslavia, August 1936

On 16 November 1936, Edward invited Prime Minister Stanley Baldwin to Buckingham Palace and expressed his desire to marry Simpson when she became free to remarry. Baldwin informed him that his subjects would deem the marriage morally unacceptable, largely because remarriage after divorce was, at the time, opposed by the Church of England, and the public would not tolerate Simpson as queen. As king, Edward was the titular head of the Church, and the clergy expected him to uphold its teachings. The Archbishop of Canterbury, Cosmo Gordon Lang, was vocal in insisting that Edward must go.

Edward proposed an alternative solution of a morganatic marriage, in which he would remain king but Simpson would not become queen consort. She would instead hold a lesser title, and any children they might have would not inherit the throne. This was supported in principle by senior politician Winston Churchill, and some historians suggest he conceived the plan. In any event, it was ultimately rejected by the British Cabinet as well as other Dominion governments. Their views were sought pursuant to the Statute of Westminster 1931, which provided in part that "any alteration in the law touching the Succession to the Throne or the Royal Style and Titles shall hereafter require the assent as well of the Parliaments of all the Dominions as of the Parliament of the United Kingdom." The Prime Ministers of Australia (Joseph Lyons), Canada (Mackenzie King), and South Africa (J. B. M. Hertzog) made clear their opposition to the King marrying a divorcée; their Irish counterpart (Éamon de Valera) expressed indifference and detachment, while the Prime Minister of New Zealand (Michael Joseph Savage), having never heard of Simpson before, vacillated in disbelief. Faced with this opposition, Edward initially responded that there were "not many people in Australia" and that their opinion did not matter.

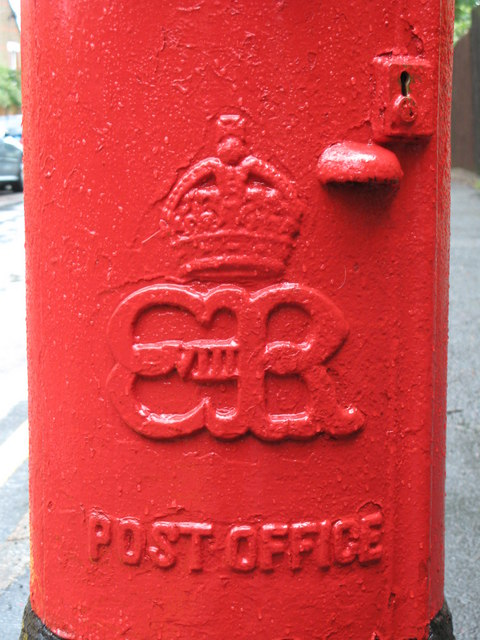
Cypher on a rare postbox erected during his short reign

Edward informed Baldwin that he would relinquish the throne if he could not marry Simpson. Baldwin then presented him with three options: give up the idea of marriage; marry against his ministers' wishes; or abdicate. It was clear that Edward was not prepared to give up Simpson, and he knew that if he married against the advice of his ministers, he would cause the government to resign, prompting a constitutional crisis. He chose to abdicate.

Edward duly signed the instruments of abdication (Note: There were fifteen separate copies – one for each Dominion, the Irish Free State, India, the House of Commons, the House of Lords and the Prime Minister, among others.) at Fort Belvedere on 10 December 1936 in the presence of his younger brothers: Prince Albert, Duke of York, next in line for the throne; Prince Henry, Duke of Gloucester; and Prince George, Duke of Kent. The document included the words: "declare my irrevocable determination to renounce the throne for myself and for my descendants and my desire that effect should be given to this instrument of abdication immediately". The next day, the last act of his reign was the royal assent to His Majesty's Declaration of Abdication Act 1936. As required by the Statute of Westminster, all the Dominions had already consented to the abdication.

On the night of 11 December 1936, Edward, now reverted to the title and style of a prince, explained his decision to abdicate in a worldwide BBC radio broadcast. He said, "I have found it impossible to carry the heavy burden of responsibility and to discharge my duties as king as I would wish to do without the help and support of the woman I love." He added that the "decision was mine and mine alone ... The other person most nearly concerned has tried up to the last to persuade me to take a different course." Edward departed Britain for Austria the following day; he was unable to join Simpson until her divorce became absolute several months later. The Duke of York succeeded to the throne as George VI. Accordingly, George VI's elder daughter, Princess Elizabeth, became heir presumptive.

== Duke of Windsor ==
On 12 December 1936, at the accession meeting of the British Privy Council, George VI announced his intention to make his brother the "Duke of Windsor" with the style of Royal Highness. He wished this to be the first act of his reign, although the formal documents were not signed until 8 March the following year. During the interim, Edward was known as the Duke of Windsor. George's decision to create Edward a royal duke ensured that he could neither stand for election to the British House of Commons nor speak on political subjects in the House of Lords.

Letters Patent dated 27 May 1937 re-conferred the "title, style, or attribute of Royal Highness" upon Edward, but specifically stated that "his wife and descendants, if any, shall not hold said title or attribute". Some British ministers advised that the reconfirmation was unnecessary, since Edward had retained the style automatically, and further that Simpson would automatically obtain the rank of wife of a prince with the style Her Royal Highness; others maintained that he had lost all royal rank and should no longer carry any royal title or style as an abdicated king, and should instead be referred to simply as "Mr Edward Windsor". On 14 April 1937, Sir Donald Somervell, the Attorney General for England and Wales, submitted to Sir John Simon, the Home Secretary, a memorandum summarising the views of Lord Advocate T. M. Cooper, Parliamentary Counsel Sir Granville Ram, and himself:

1. We incline to the view that on his abdication the Duke of Windsor could not have claimed the right to be described as a Royal Highness. In other words, no reasonable objection could have been taken if the King had decided that his exclusion from the lineal succession excluded him from the right to this title as conferred by the existing Letters Patent.
2. The question however has to be considered on the basis of the fact that, for reasons which are readily understandable, he with the express approval of His Majesty enjoys this title and has been referred to as a Royal Highness on a formal occasion and in formal documents. In the light of precedent it seems clear that the wife of a Royal Highness enjoys the same title unless some appropriate express step can be and is taken to deprive her of it.

3. We came to the conclusion that the wife could not claim this right on any legal basis. The right to use this style or title, in our view, is within the prerogative of His Majesty and he has the power to regulate it by Letters Patent generally or in particular circumstances.

=== Wedding ===
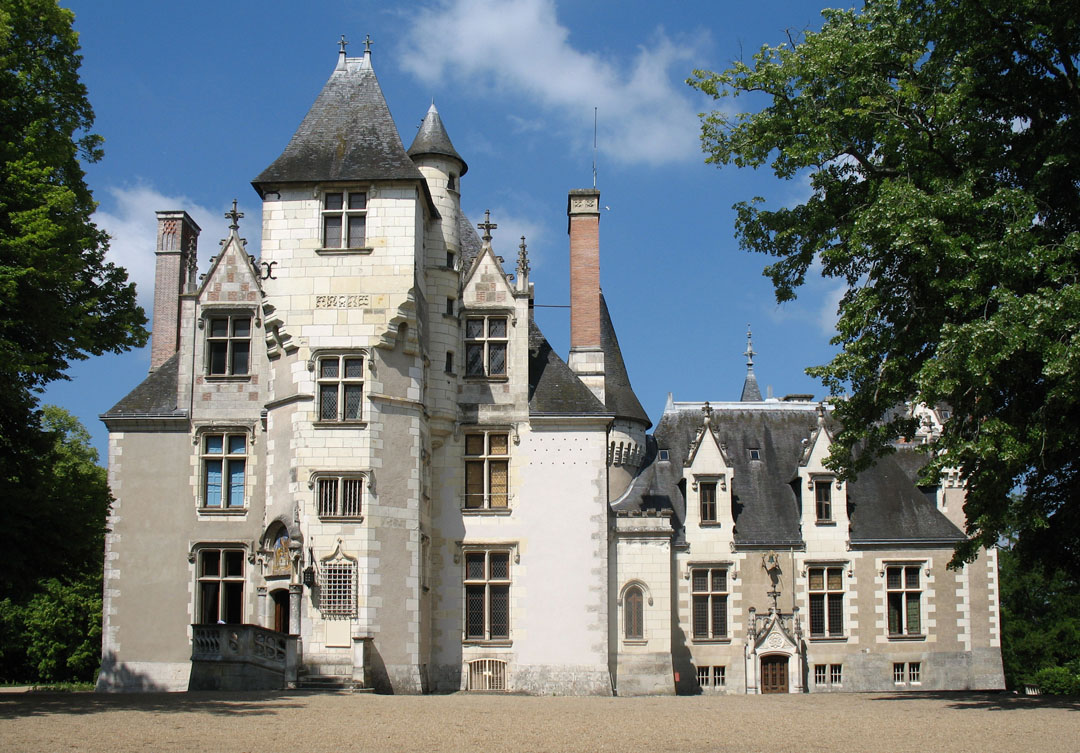
The Château de Candé, the Windsors' wedding venue, south of Tours in France

Edward married Simpson, who had changed her name by deed poll to Wallis Warfield (her birth surname), in a private ceremony on 3 June 1937, at Château de Candé, near Tours, France. When the Church of England refused to sanction the union, a County Durham clergyman, Robert Anderson Jardine (Vicar of St Paul's, Darlington), offered to perform the ceremony, and Edward accepted. George VI forbade members of the royal family to attend, to the enduring resentment of the couple. Edward had particularly wished his brothers, the Dukes of Gloucester and Kent, and his second cousin Lord Louis Mountbatten, to attend the ceremony. The French organist and composer Marcel Dupré played at the wedding.

The denial of the style Royal Highness to Wallis caused further conflict, as did the financial settlement. The Government declined to include Edward and Wallis on the Civil List, and his allowance was paid personally by George VI. Edward compromised his position with his brother by concealing his full financial worth when they informally agreed upon the amount of the annual allowance. Edward had accumulated wealth over the previous twenty-six years from the revenues of the Duchy of Cornwall, paid to him as Prince of Wales, which was ordinarily at the disposal of the incoming monarch. George also purchased Sandringham House and Balmoral Castle from Edward; both were Edward's personal property, inherited from his father, and thus did not automatically pass to George VI on his accession. Edward received approximately £300,000 (equivalent to between £23.8 million and £173 million in 2024) for both residences, which was paid to him in yearly instalments. In the early days of George VI's reign, Edward telephoned daily, importuning for money and urging that Wallis be granted the style of Royal Highness, until the harassed king ordered that the calls not be put through.

Relations between Edward and the rest of the royal family remained strained for decades. He had assumed that he would settle in Britain after a year or two of exile in France. King George VI (with the support of Queen Mary and his wife Queen Elizabeth) threatened to cut off Edward's allowance if he returned to Britain without an invitation. Edward became embittered toward his mother, Queen Mary, writing to her in 1939: "[your last letter] (Note: She had asked Alec Hardinge to write to Edward explaining that he could not be invited to his father's memorial.) destroy[ed] the last vestige of feeling I had left for you ... [and has] made further normal correspondence between us impossible."

Duke and Duchess of Windsor in Germany, October 1937

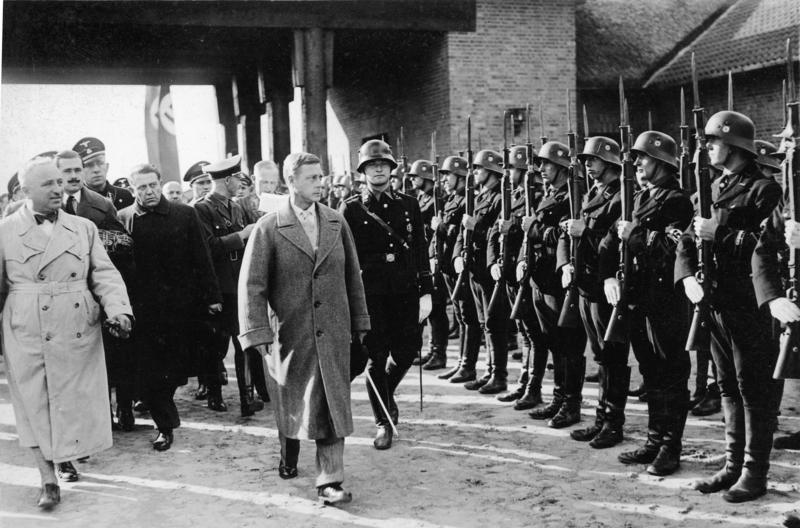
Edward reviewing SS guards with Robert Ley

The Duke and Duchess meeting Adolf Hitler at Berchtesgaden

=== 1937 tour of Germany ===
In October 1937, Edward and Wallis visited Nazi Germany, against the advice of the British government, and met Adolf Hitler at his Berghof retreat in Bavaria. The visit was widely publicised by the German media. During it, Edward gave full Nazi salutes. In Germany, "they were treated like royalty ... members of the aristocracy would bow and curtsy towards her, and she was treated with all the dignity and status that the duke always wanted", according to royal biographer Andrew Morton in a 2016 BBC interview.

The former Austrian ambassador Count Albert von Mensdorff-Pouilly-Dietrichstein, who was also a second cousin once removed and friend of George V, believed that Edward favoured German fascism as a bulwark against communism, and even that he initially favoured an alliance with Germany. According to Edward, the experience of "the unending scenes of horror" during the First World War led him to support appeasement. Hitler considered Edward to be friendly towards Germany and thought that Anglo-German relations could have been improved through Edward had it not been for the abdication. Albert Speer quoted Hitler directly: "I am certain through him permanent friendly relations could have been achieved. If he had stayed, everything would have been different. His abdication was a severe loss for us." Edward and Wallis settled in Paris, leasing a mansion in Boulevard Suchet from late 1938.

=== Second World War ===
In May 1939, Edward was commissioned by NBC to give a radio broadcast (his first since abdicating) during a visit to the First World War battlefields of Verdun. In it, he appealed for peace, saying: "I am deeply conscious of the presence of the great company of the dead, and I am convinced that could they make their voices heard they would be with me in what I am about to say. I speak simply as a soldier of the Last War whose most earnest prayer it is that such cruel and destructive madness shall never again overtake mankind. There is no land whose people want war." The broadcast was heard across the world by millions. It was widely regarded as supporting appeasement, and the BBC refused to broadcast it. It was transmitted outside the United States on shortwave radio and was reported in full by British broadsheet newspapers.

On the outbreak of the Second World War in September 1939, Edward and Wallis were brought back to Britain by Louis Mountbatten on board HMS Kelly, and Edward, although he held the rank of field marshal, was made a major-general attached to the British Military Mission in France. In February 1940, the German ambassador in The Hague, Count Julius von Zech-Burkersroda, claimed that Edward had leaked the Allied war plans for the defence of Belgium, which he later denied. When Germany invaded northern France in May 1940, the Windsors fled south, first to Biarritz, then in June to Francoist Spain. In July they moved to Portugal, where they lived initially in the home of Ricardo Espírito Santo, a Portuguese banker with both British and German contacts. Under the code name Operation Willi, Nazi agents, principally Walter Schellenberg, plotted unsuccessfully to persuade Edward to leave Portugal and return to Spain, kidnapping him if necessary. Lord Caldecote wrote a warning to Winston Churchill, now prime minister, that "[the Duke] is well-known to be pro-Nazi and he may become a centre of intrigue." Churchill threatened Edward with a court-martial if he did not return to British soil.

In July 1940, Edward was appointed governor of the Bahamas. Edward and Wallis left Lisbon on 1 August aboard the American Export Lines steamship Excalibur, which was specially diverted from its usual direct course to New York City so that they could be dropped off at Bermuda on the 9th. They left Bermuda for Nassau on the Canadian National Steamship Company vessel Lady Somers on 15 August, arriving two days later. Edward did not enjoy being governor and privately referred to the islands as "a third-class British colony". The British Foreign Office strenuously objected when Edward and Wallis planned to cruise aboard a yacht belonging to Swedish magnate Axel Wenner-Gren, whom British and American intelligence wrongly believed to be a close friend of Luftwaffe commander Hermann Göring. Edward was praised for his efforts to combat poverty on the islands. He was "considerably more enlightened in his attitudes than the majority of Bahamian whites, or either of his predecessors", and had an "excellent relationship" with Black individuals such as jazz musician Bert Cambridge (later elected to the Bahamian House of Assembly, to Edward's delight) and valet Sydney Johnson, whom Edward retained for thirty years and was said to have "loved as a son". Edward maintained a long-standing dispute with Étienne Dupuch, the editor of the Nassau Daily Tribune, writing privately at one point that Dupuch was "more than half Negro, and due to the peculiar mentality of this Race, they seem unable to rise to prominence without losing their equilibrium". But even Dupuch praised Edward for his resolution of civil unrest over low wages in Nassau in 1942, though Edward blamed the trouble on "mischief makers – communists" and "men of Central European Jewish descent, who had secured jobs as a pretext for obtaining a deferment of draft".

While Edward was governor, Sir Harry Oakes, a wealthy entrepreneur who was the richest man in the Bahamas and possibly the British Empire and a friend of his, was violently murdered on 8 July 1943. Instead of using the usual Bahamian or British procedures, Edward brought in two American detectives from Miami whom he knew personally to handle the investigation. Within 36 hours, Oakes's son-in-law, Alfred de Marigny, was charged with the murder after a single fingerprint was reported at the scene. The preliminary investigation was described as "botched", and the fingerprint was found to have been planted. Edward absented himself from the island for the period of de Marigny's trial. De Marigny was eventually acquitted, and the case was closed.

Many historians have suggested that Hitler was prepared to reinstate Edward as king in the hope of establishing a fascist puppet government in Britain after Operation Sea Lion. It is widely believed that Edward and Wallis sympathised with fascism before and during the Second World War, and were moved to the Bahamas to minimise their opportunities to act on those feelings. In 1940 he said: "In the past 10 years Germany has totally reorganised the order of its society ... Countries which were unwilling to accept such a reorganisation of society and its concomitant sacrifices should direct their policies accordingly." During the occupation of France, Edward asked the German Wehrmacht forces to place guards at his Paris and Riviera homes; they did so. In December 1940, Edward gave Fulton Oursler of Liberty magazine an interview at Government House in Nassau. Oursler conveyed its content to President Franklin D. Roosevelt in a private meeting at the White House on 23 December 1940. The interview was published on 22 March 1941, and in it Edward was reported to have said that "Hitler was the right and logical leader of the German people" and that the time was coming for President Roosevelt to mediate a peace settlement. Edward protested that he had been misquoted and misinterpreted.

The Allies became sufficiently disturbed by German plots revolving around Edward that President Roosevelt ordered covert surveillance of him and Wallis when they visited Palm Beach, Florida, in April 1941. Duke Carl Alexander of Württemberg (then a monk in an American monastery) had told the Federal Bureau of Investigation that Wallis had slept with the German ambassador in London, Joachim von Ribbentrop, in 1936; had remained in constant contact with him; and had continued to leak secrets.

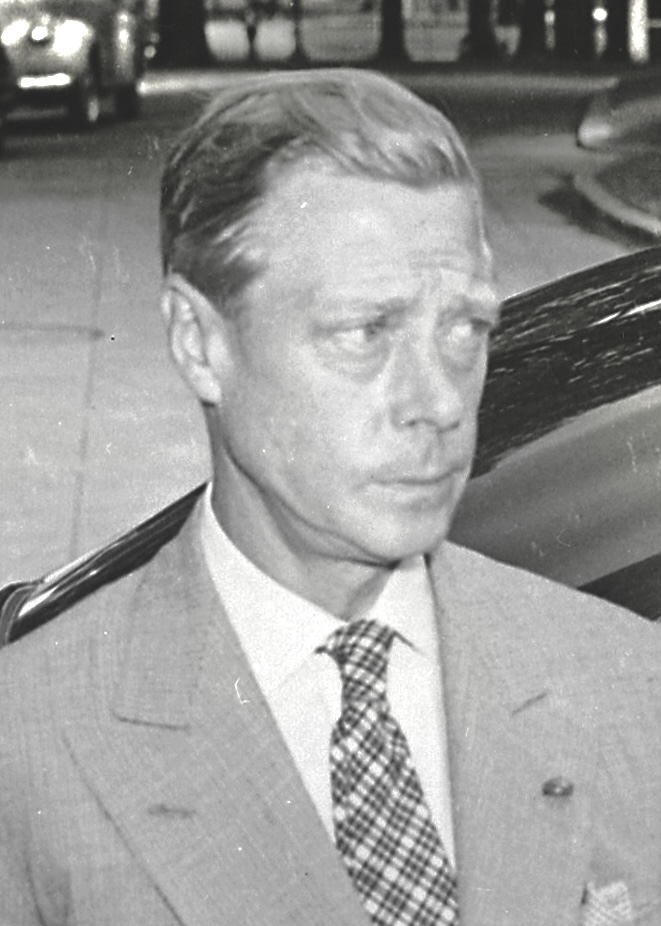
Edward in 1945

Author Charles Higham claimed that Anthony Blunt, an MI5 agent and Soviet spy, acting on orders from the British royal family, made a successful secret trip to Schloss Friedrichshof in Allied-occupied Germany towards the end of the war to retrieve sensitive letters between Edward and Hitler and other leading Nazis. What is certain is that George VI sent the Royal Librarian, Owen Morshead, accompanied by Blunt – then working part-time in the Royal Library as well as for British intelligence – to Friedrichshof in March 1945 to secure papers relating to Victoria, German Empress, the eldest child of Queen Victoria. Looters had stolen part of the castle's archive, including surviving letters between mother and daughter, as well as other valuables, some of which were recovered in Chicago after the war. The papers rescued by Morshead and Blunt, and those returned by the American authorities from Chicago, were deposited in the Royal Archives.

Documents, since titled the Marburg Files, recovered by US troops in Marburg, Germany, in May 1945, include key material that relates directly to theories of Edward's Nazi sympathies. After more than a decade of suppression by the British authorities, they were published in the late 1950s.

He resigned from the post of governor on 16 March 1945. After the war, Edward admitted in his memoirs that he admired the Germans, but he denied being pro-Nazi. Of Hitler he wrote: "[the] Führer struck me as a somewhat ridiculous figure, with his theatrical posturings and his bombastic pretensions." In the 1950s, journalist Frank Giles heard Edward blame British foreign secretary Anthony Eden for helping to "precipitate the war through his treatment of Mussolini ... that's what [Eden] did, he helped to bring on the war ... and of course Roosevelt and the Jews". During the 1960s, in private, Edward reportedly said to a friend, Patrick Balfour, 3rd Baron Kinross, "I never thought Hitler was such a bad chap."

== Later life ==
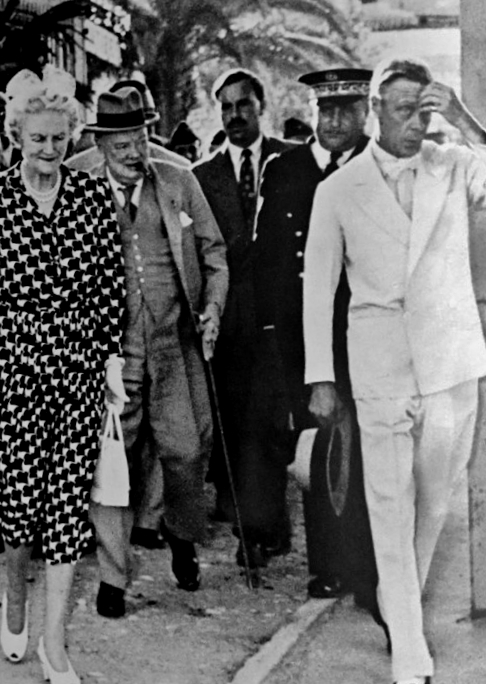
With Clementine (far left) and Winston Churchill on the French Riviera, 1948

At the end of the war, the couple returned to France and spent the remainder of their lives essentially in retirement, as Edward never again held an official role. Letters written by Kenneth de Courcy to Edward, dated between 1946 and 1949 and published in extract form in 2009, suggest a scheme in which Edward would return to England and place himself in a position for a possible regency. The health of George VI was failing and de Courcy was concerned about the influence of the Mountbatten family over the young Princess Elizabeth. De Courcy proposed that Edward should buy a working agricultural estate within easy reach of London in order to gain favour with the British public and make himself available should the King become incapacitated. Edward, however, hesitated, and the King recovered from his surgery. De Courcy also mentioned the possibility of the British occupation zone in Germany becoming a kingdom with Edward as its monarch. Nothing came of the suggestion.

Edward's allowance was supplemented by government favours and illegal currency trading. The City of Paris provided Edward with a house at 4 route du Champ d'Entraînement, on the Neuilly-sur-Seine side of the Bois de Boulogne, for a nominal rent. The French government also exempted him from paying income tax, and the couple were able to buy goods duty-free through the British embassy and the military commissary. In 1952, they bought and renovated a weekend country retreat, Le Moulin de la Tuilerie at Gif-sur-Yvette, the only property the couple ever owned themselves. In 1951, Edward produced a memoir, A King's Story ghost-written by Charles Murphy, in which he expressed disagreement with liberal politics. The royalties from the book added to Edward and Wallis's income.

Edward and Wallis effectively took on the role of celebrities and were regarded as part of café society in the 1950s and 1960s. They hosted parties and shuttled between Paris and New York; Gore Vidal, who met the Windsors socially, reported on the vacuity of Edward's conversation. The couple doted on the pug dogs they kept.

In June 1953, instead of attending the coronation of Queen Elizabeth II, his niece, in London, Edward and Wallis watched the ceremony on television in Paris. Edward said that it was contrary to precedent for a sovereign or former sovereign to attend the coronation of another. He was paid to write articles on the ceremony for the Sunday Express and Woman's Home Companion, as well as a short book, The Crown and the People, 1902–1953.

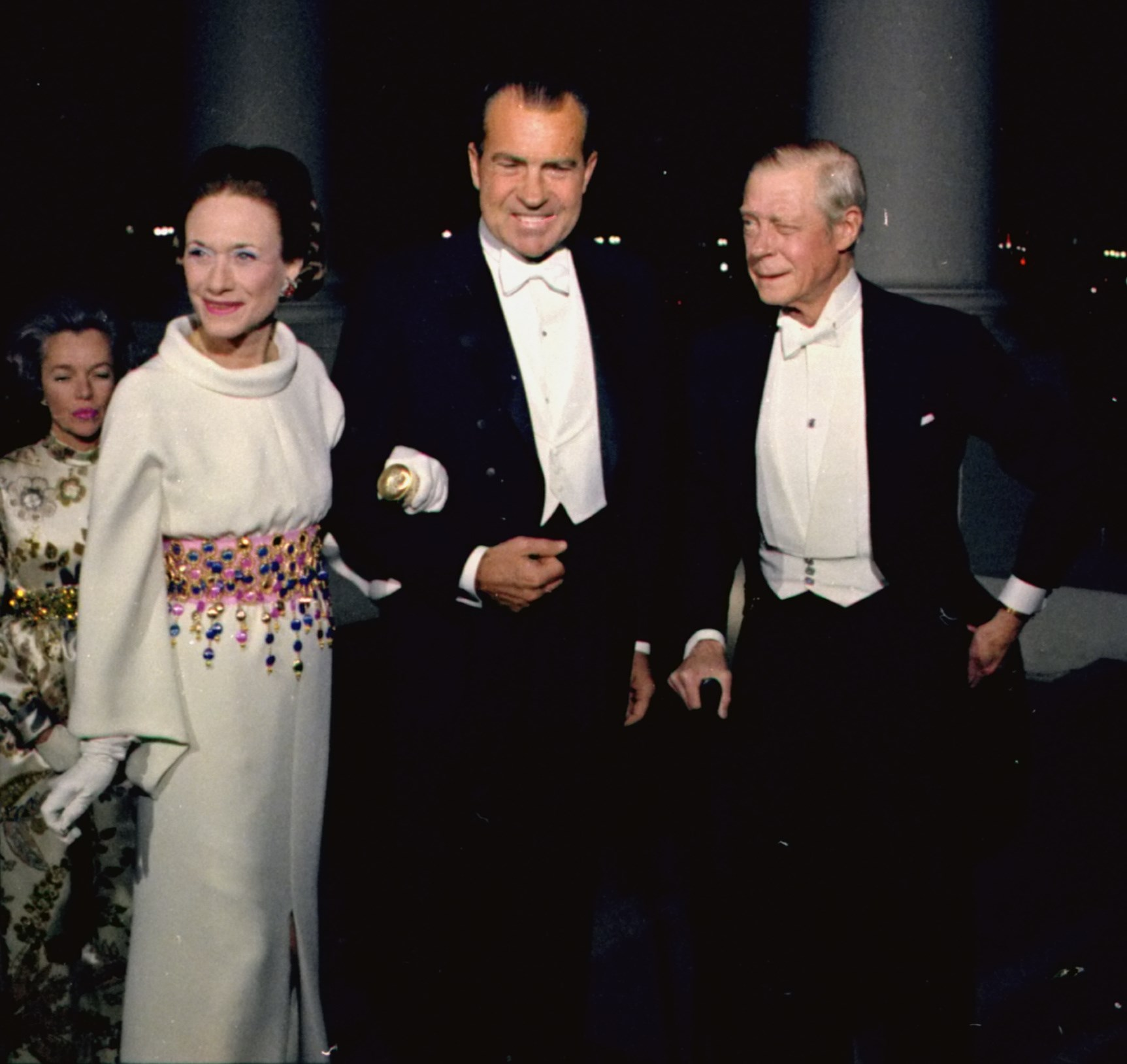
With Wallis and U.S. president Richard Nixon, 1970

In 1955, the couple visited President Dwight D. Eisenhower at the White House. The couple appeared on Edward R. Murrow's television-interview show Person to Person in 1956, and in a 50-minute BBC television interview in 1970. On 4 April of that year, President Richard Nixon invited them as guests of honour to a dinner at the White House with Chief Justice Warren E. Burger, Charles Lindbergh, Alice Roosevelt Longworth, Arnold Palmer, George H. W. Bush, and Frank Borman.

The royal family never fully accepted Wallis. Queen Mary refused to receive her formally. Edward, however, sometimes met his mother and his brother, George VI; he attended George's funeral in 1952. Mary remained angry with Edward and indignant over his marriage to Wallis: "To give up all this for that", she said. In 1965, Edward and Wallis returned to London. They were visited by his niece Elizabeth II, his sister-in-law Princess Marina, Duchess of Kent, and his sister Mary, Princess Royal and Countess of Harewood. A week later, the Princess Royal died, and they attended her memorial service. In 1966, Edward gave the journalist Georg Stefan Troller a ZDF TV interview in German; he answered questions about his abdication. In 1967, Edward and Wallis joined the royal family for the centenary of Queen Mary's birth. The last royal ceremony Edward attended was the funeral of Princess Marina in 1968. He declined an invitation from Elizabeth II to attend the investiture of Charles, Prince of Wales, in 1969, replying that Charles would not want his "aged great-uncle" there. Charles briefly visited Edward at his Parisian residence on 4 October 1970.

In the 1960s, Edward's health deteriorated. Michael E. DeBakey operated on him in Houston for an aneurysm of the abdominal aorta in December 1964, and Sir Stewart Duke-Elder treated a detached retina in his left eye in February 1965. In late 1971, Edward, who had been a smoker from an early age, was diagnosed with throat cancer and underwent cobalt therapy. In September 1971, he hosted Emperor Hirohito and Empress Nagako of Japan at his Parisian residence. Edward had previously met Hirohito fifty years earlier. On 18 May 1972, Queen Elizabeth II visited Edward and Wallis while on a state visit to France; she met Edward alone for 15 minutes, but only Wallis appeared with the royal party for a photocall, which included Prince Philip and Prince Charles, as Edward was too ill.

=== Death and legacy ===
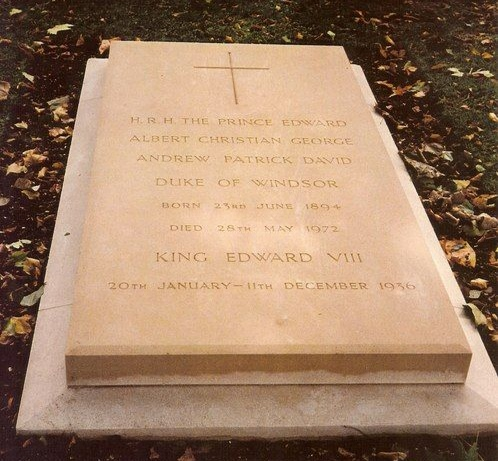
Edward's grave at the Royal Burial Ground, Frogmore, in Home Park, Windsor

Edward died at his home in Paris on 28 May 1972, aged 77, ten days after Elizabeth's visit. His body was returned to Britain, lying in state at St George's Chapel, Windsor Castle. The funeral service took place in the chapel on 5 June in the presence of the Queen, the royal family, and Wallis, who stayed at Buckingham Palace during her visit. He was buried in the Royal Burial Ground behind the Royal Mausoleum of Queen Victoria and Prince Albert at Frogmore. Until a 1965 agreement with the Queen, Edward and Wallis had planned for a burial in a cemetery plot they had purchased at Green Mount Cemetery in Baltimore, where Wallis's father was interred. Frail, and suffering increasingly from dementia, Wallis died in 1986 and was buried alongside her husband.

In the view of historians such as Philip Williamson, writing in 2007, the popular perception in the 21st century that the abdication was driven by politics rather than religious morality is false and arises because divorce has become much more common and socially acceptable. To modern sensibilities, the religious restrictions that prevented Edward from continuing as king while planning to marry Wallis "seem, wrongly, to provide insufficient explanation" for his abdication.

== Titles, honours and arms ==
Edward's coat of arms as the Prince of Wales was the royal coat of arms of the United Kingdom, differenced with a label of three points argent, with an inescutcheon representing Wales surmounted by a coronet. As Sovereign, he bore the royal arms undifferenced. After his abdication, he used the arms again differenced by a label of three points argent, but this time with the centre point bearing an imperial crown.

Coats of arms of Edward VIII

Coat of arms as Prince of Wales (granted 1911)

Coat of arms as King of the United Kingdom

Scottish coat of arms as King of the United Kingdom

Coat of arms as Duke of Windsor

== Ancestry ==
Ancestors of Edward VIII

8. Prince Albert of Saxe-Coburg and Gotha
4. Edward VII of the United Kingdom
9. Queen Victoria of the United Kingdom
2. George V of the United Kingdom
10. Christian IX of Denmark
5. Princess Alexandra of Denmark
11. Princess Louise of Hesse-Kassel
1. Edward VIII of the United Kingdom
12. Duke Alexander of Württemberg
6. Francis, Duke of Teck
13. Countess Claudine Rhédey von Kis-Rhéde
3. Princess Mary of Teck
14. Prince Adolphus, Duke of Cambridge
7. Princess Mary Adelaide of Cambridge
15. Princess Augusta of Hesse-Kassel

== See also ==
- Cultural depictions of Edward VIII and Wallis Simpson
- Abandoned coronation of Edward VIII
- List of prime ministers of Edward VIII

== Bibliography ==
- Bloch, Michael (1982). The Duke of Windsor's War. London: Weidenfeld and Nicolson. ISBN 0-297-77947-8.
- Bradford, Sarah (1989). King George VI. London: Weidenfeld and Nicolson. ISBN 0-297-79667-4.
- Donaldson, Frances (1974). Edward VIII. London: Weidenfeld and Nicolson. ISBN 0-297-76787-9.
- Godfrey, Rupert (editor) (1998). Letters From a Prince: Edward to Mrs Freda Dudley Ward 1918–1921. Little, Brown & Co. ISBN 0-7515-2590-1.
- Parker, John (1988). King of Fools. New York: St. Martin's Press. ISBN 0-312-02598-X.
- Pimlott, Ben (2001). The Queen: Elizabeth II and the Monarchy. London: HarperCollins. ISBN 0-00-255494-1.
- Pope-Hennessy, James (2018). The Quest for Queen Mary. Edited and with text by Hugo Vickers. Hodder & Stoughton. ISBN 978-1529330625.
- Roberts, Andrew; edited by Antonia Fraser (2000). The House of Windsor. London: Cassell and Co. ISBN 0-304-35406-6.
- Wheeler-Bennett, Sir John (1958). King George VI. London: Macmillan.
- Williams, Susan (2003). The People's King: The True Story of the Abdication. London: Allen Lane. ISBN 978-0-7139-9573-2.
- Windsor, The Duke of (1951). A King's Story. London: Cassell and Co.
- Ziegler, Philip (1991). King Edward VIII: The official biography. New York: Alfred A. Knopf. ISBN 0-394-57730-2.

Edward VIII House of Windsor Cadet branch of the House of Wettin Born: 23 June 1894 Died: 28 May 1972
Regnal titles
Preceded by George V	King of the United Kingdom and the British Dominions; Emperor of India; 20 January – 11 December 1936	Succeeded by George VI
British royalty
Preceded by George (V)	Prince of Wales; Duke of Cornwall; Duke of Rothesay; 1910–1936	Vacant Title next held by Charles (III)
Government offices
Preceded by Sir Charles Dundas	Governor of the Bahamas; 1940–1945	Succeeded by Sir William Lindsay Murphy
Honorary titles
Vacant Title last held by The Prince of Wales	Grand Master of the Order of St Michael and St George; 1917–1936	Succeeded by The Earl of Athlone
New title	Grand Master of the Order of the British Empire; 1917–1936	Succeeded by Queen Mary
New title	Air Commodore-in-Chief of the Auxiliary Air Force; 1932–1936	Succeeded by King George VI
Academic offices
New office	Chancellor of the University of Cape Town; 1918–1936	Succeeded by Jan Smuts
