= Villa Windsor =

Building in Paris, France

4 route du Champ d'Entraînement
- Location within Paris
- Former names: Château Le Bois
- Alternative names: Villa Windsor

General information
- Type: Villa
- Architectural style: French Neoclassical
- Location: Bois de Boulogne, Paris, France
- Coordinates: 48.8742°N 2.2523°E
- Current tenants: Mansart Foundation
- Completed: 1929
- Renovated: 1986–1989
- Renovation cost: $14.4 million (equivalent to $29.7 million in 2020)
- Owner: City of Paris

Technical details
- Floor count: 3

Design and construction
- Known for: Former home of the Duke and Duchess of Windsor

Other information
- Number of rooms: 14

4 route du Champ d'Entraînement, also known as Villa Windsor, is a historic villa in the 16th arrondissement of Paris, France. It is located within the northwest section of the Bois de Boulogne, close to the southern edge of Neuilly-sur-Seine. It was the main residence of the Duke and Duchess of Windsor from 1953 until the Duke's death in 1972, and the Duchess continued to live there until she died in 1986.

== Early history ==
Originally named Château Le Bois, the villa is a French Neoclassical-style building of fourteen rooms and is surrounded by a large tree-filled garden.

=== Charles de Gaulle ===
It was built from 1928 to 1929 by the French architect Roger Bouvard (1875–1961) for Henri Lillaz. The government sequestered the property subsequent to the Liberation of Paris in 1944, after which General Charles de Gaulle and his family occupied the house until 1946.

== Home of the Duke and Duchess of Windsor ==
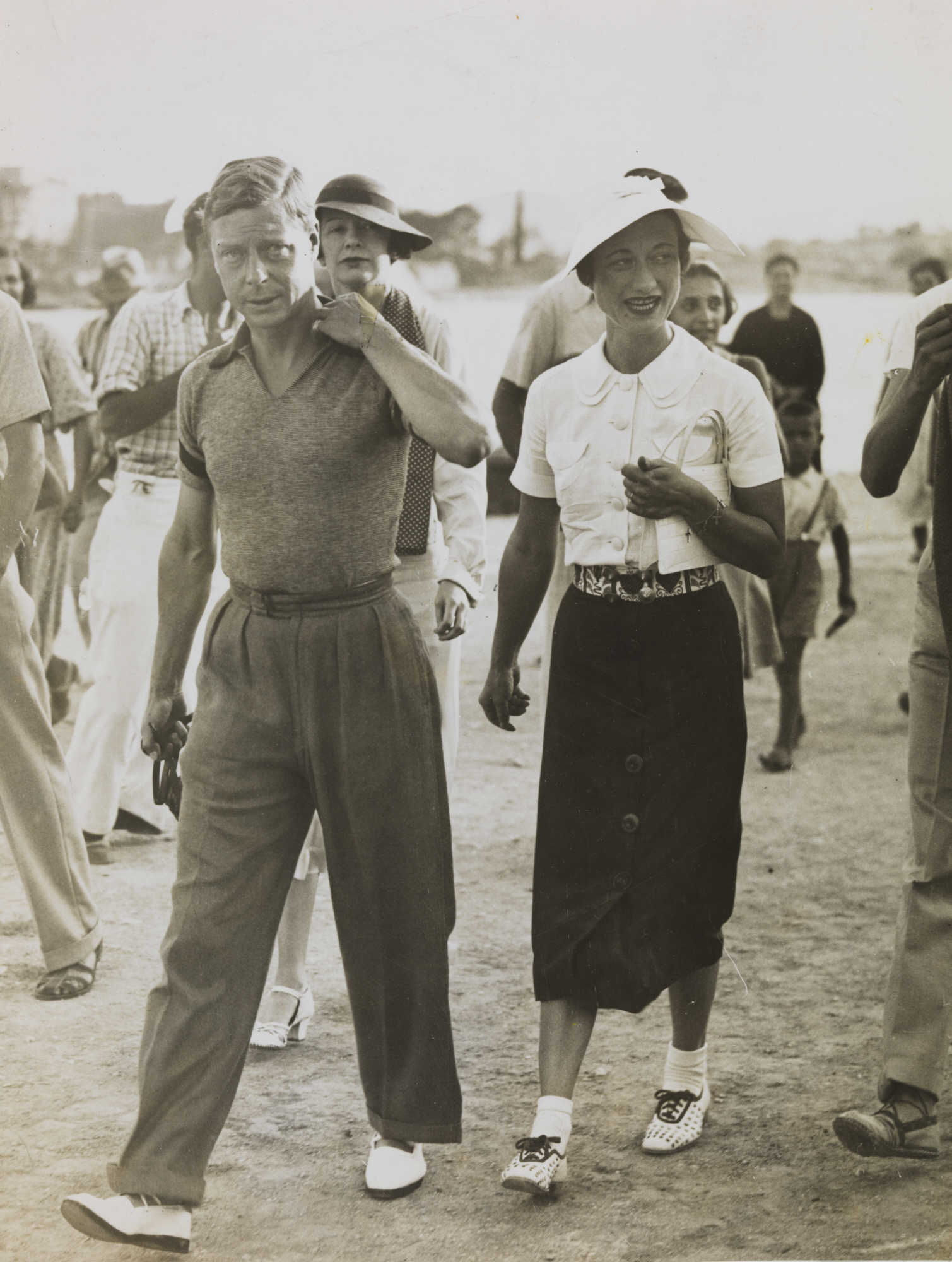
The Duke and Duchess of Windsor, former residents of the villa.

Following Edward VIII's abdication as King-Emperor in 1936, he was created Duke of Windsor by King George VI in 1937. The Duke married Wallis Simpson on 3 June 1937 at the Château de Candé in France, and she became known as the Duchess of Windsor at that point.

Before World War II and for a period thereafter, the Duke and Duchess lived in a rented villa, the Château de la Croë, at Cap d'Antibes on the French Riviera.

The villa at 4 route du Champ d'Entraînement was leased to the Windsors by the City of Paris in 1953 at a nominal rent. Maison Jansen, the Parisian decorating firm, refurbished the home under the supervision of the Duchess. The Duke and Duchess both died at the house, in 1972 and 1986 respectively.

While the villa served as their main residence, the Windsors also owned a country house (Moulin de la Tuilerie), where they spent most weekends and summer holidays. That property is located in Gif-sur-Yvette, southwest of Paris.

== Residence of Mohamed Al-Fayed ==
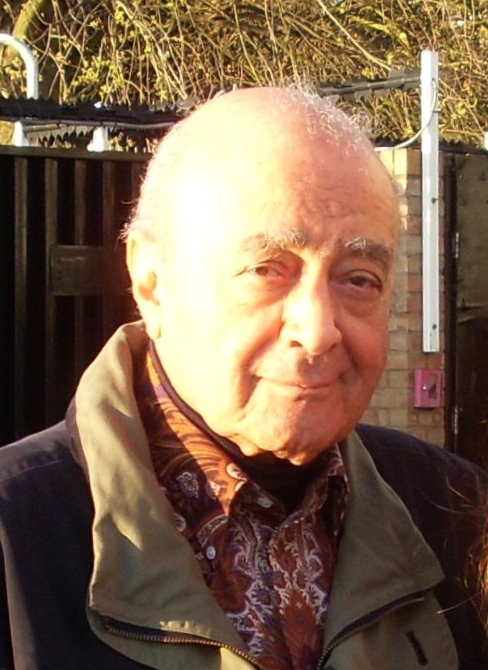
Mohamed Al-Fayed, former resident of the villa.

After the Duchess of Windsor's death in April 1986, the house was returned to the City of Paris. Later that year, the London-based Egyptian businessman Mohamed Al-Fayed, the owner of Harrods at that time, signed a fifty-year lease on the villa.

The rent was one million francs per year, subject to the condition that he spend thirty million francs renovating the house. Al-Fayed extensively refurbished and restored what he termed the Villa Windsor, and for his efforts, he was promoted to the grade of Officer in the Légion d'honneur in 1989. The former valet of the Duke of Windsor, Sydney Johnson, acted as a curator to the restoration.

Al-Fayed's son Dodi visited the villa with Diana, Princess of Wales, for half an hour on the day before their deaths in 1997.

=== Sale of the Windsors' possessions ===
In July 1997, Al-Fayed announced that an auction of the Duke and Duchess of Windsor's possessions from the villa would take place later that year in New York. He had bought the contents of the property for the equivalent of US$4.5 million from the principal beneficiary of the Duchess's estate, the Pasteur Institute. The items to be offered for sale had personal value for the British royal family and included the desk at which Edward VIII had abdicated in 1936, a collection of some ten thousand photographs, and a doll given to Edward by his mother, Queen Mary.

Following the deaths of Al-Fayed's son Dodi and Diana, Princess of Wales, the auction was postponed, but it eventually took place in February 1998 at Sotheby's New York with more than 40,000 items for sale, divided into 3,200 lots. The proceeds from the auction went to the Dodi Fayed International Charitable Foundation and causes associated with the late Princess of Wales. Members of the British royal family were believed to have purchased all but a tiny handful of the items in the sale, though officially they remained anonymous.

Al-Fayed ended the lease in 2018.

== Restoration and current status ==
Following a call for expressions of interest in 2021, and a selection process between a few candidates, the Paris Council decided to entrust the property to the Mansart Foundation. Since then, the foundation has managed the house, with the aim of opening it to the public.

The foundation is restoring the villa at an estimated cost of €8.7 million, using a combination of funds from private sponsorships and skill-based sponsorships.

It was planned for the house to open its doors to the public in late 2025. As of July 2026, the house remains closed.
