= Death and funeral of Prince Edward, Duke of Windsor =

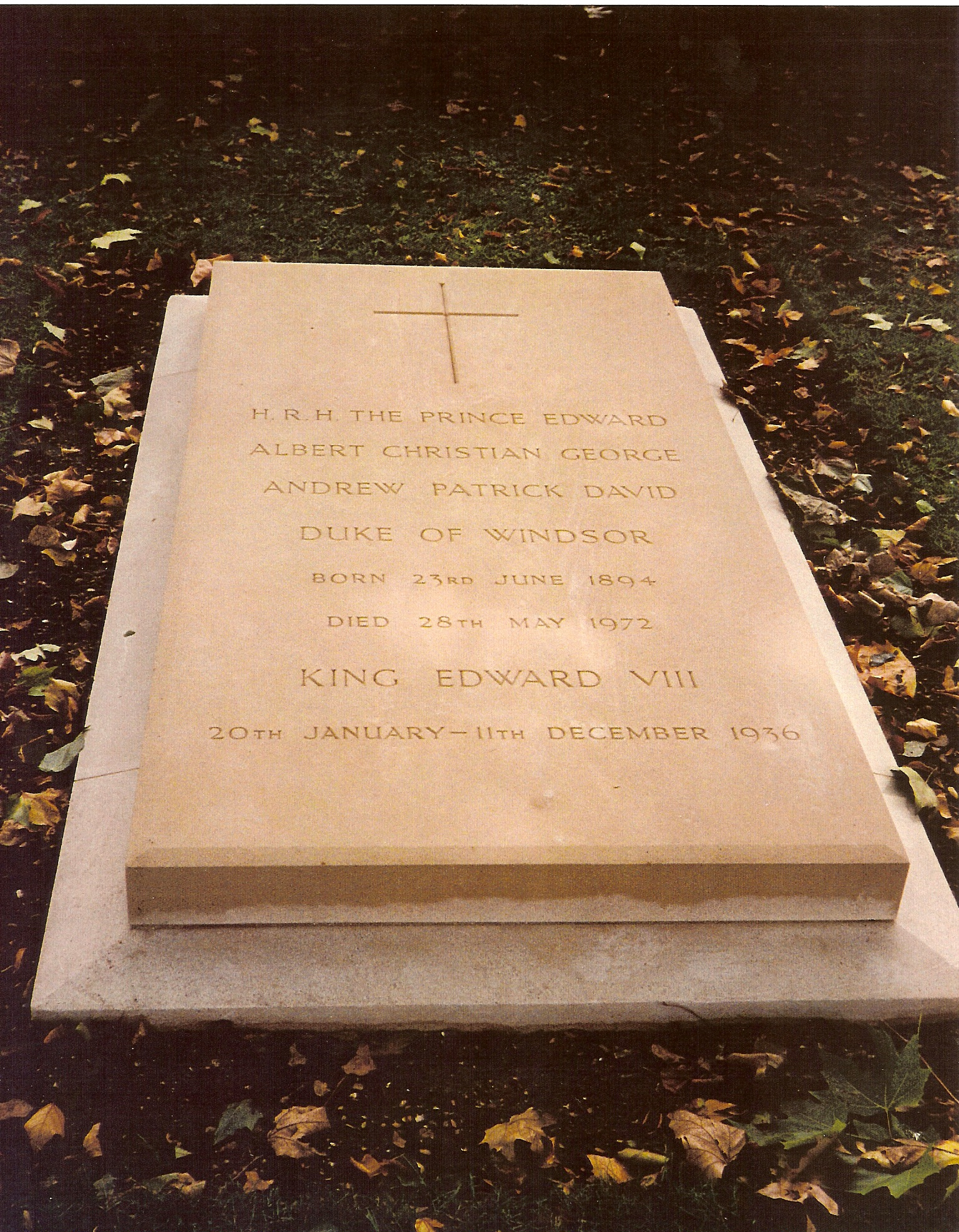
The grave of Prince Edward, Duke of Windsor, in the Royal Burial Ground, Frogmore

The funeral of Prince Edward, Duke of Windsor, took place on 5 June 1972. Edward had been King of the United Kingdom from 20 January to 11 December 1936, reigning as Edward VIII before his abdication, and had lived in Paris at the time of his death. His funeral took place at St George's Chapel in Windsor Castle after lying in state for three days and he was buried at the Royal Burial Ground at Frogmore. His widow, Wallis, Duchess of Windsor, was buried alongside him in 1986.

== Background ==
Edward died on 28 May 1972 in Paris. A heavy smoker, he had suffered from throat cancer. He had reigned as King of the United Kingdom between 20 January and 11 December 1936 and had abdicated due to his wish to marry Wallis Simpson. His brother, Prince Albert, Duke of York, had succeeded him as king under the regnal name George VI. George died in 1952 and his eldest daughter, Queen Elizabeth II, succeeded him.

Elizabeth II had visited Edward in Paris on 18 May 1972, ten days before his death. Edward's body was flown to Britain, landing at RAF Benson, and lay in the Albert Memorial Chapel in Windsor Castle on 2 June before being carried by soldiers of the Welsh Guards into St George's Chapel the following day where he lay in state for three days. The coffin was displayed on a catafalque with blue carpeting in the centre of the nave. A large candleholder stood at each corner, with each end marked by a cross. Edward's coffin was draped with his royal standard and surmounted with a cross formed of white Easter lilies given by Wallis.

His widow, Wallis, stayed at Buckingham Palace during her visit. Wallis was suffering from mental confusion due to arteriosclerosis and was nervous about meeting Queen Elizabeth the Queen Mother who had a long held antipathy toward her due to the strain that Edward's abdication had had on her husband, George VI. Wallis was reassured by Lord Mountbatten that "Your sister-in-law will receive you with open arms. She is deeply sorry for you in your present grief and remembers what it was like when her husband died". Elizabeth met Wallis only once during her stay, on the day of the funeral. Queue barriers in anticipation of mourners to the laying in state stretched for half a mile down the length of Castle Hill. A car park for 2,000 cars was established in the Home Park. Thousands of mourners filed past his coffin.

== Funeral and burial ==
Edward's standard was draped over his coffin during the service

The funeral service commenced at 11:15 am and lasted for 30 minutes. The bell in the tower tolled for an hour prior to the service. The service was conducted by the Dean of Windsor, Launcelot Fleming, and the blessing was given by the Archbishop of Canterbury, Michael Ramsey. The Archbishop of York, Donald Coggan, and the Moderator of the General Assembly of the Church of Scotland, Ronnie Selby Wright, were also present. The lesson was from chapters 4 and 5 of 2 Corinthians and was read by the Precentor of St George's, Canon Bryan Bentley. The hymn "Lead Us Heavenly Father Lead us" was sung before the traditional recitation of Edward's titles as monarch by the Garter King of Arms, followed by the Last Post and the Reveille played by the State Trumpeters of the Household Cavalry. Wallis sat next to Queen Elizabeth II and Prince Philip, Duke of Edinburgh. Elizabeth II's children Prince Charles and Princess Anne, her sister Princess Margaret, Margaret's husband the Earl of Snowdon, and the Queen Mother were also present. Various diplomats and peers, Prime Minister Edward Heath, the leader of the opposition Harold Wilson and the former Prime Minister and former Foreign Secretary the Earl of Avon were also in attendance. In the choir also stood King Olav V of Norway, the Earl Mountbatten of Burma, Prince Edward, Duke of Kent, and Prince Richard of Gloucester. Edward's sole surviving brother, Prince Henry, Duke of Gloucester, was unable to attend due to ill health. His coffin was carried into St George's Chapel from the Albert Memorial Chapel by soldiers of the Welsh Guards. The last post and reveille were played by trumpeters following the service. Following the service Edward was buried at the Royal Burial Ground at Frogmore. Edward had chosen to be buried in the Royal Burial Ground as opposed to St George's Chapel. The burial was attended by only 14 people. They included Queen Elizabeth II, Prince Philip, Duke of Edinburgh, Prince Charles and John Utter, the Duke of Windsor's secretary, who had accompanied the Duchess to England and who was with her on her return to Paris. Wallis flew directly back to Paris following the ceremony. Also present at the funeral service was Sydney Johnson, the personal valet of the Duke.

Edward's funeral was filmed by television stations but not broadcast, but was broadcast live on BBC Radio 3. The BBC hid their broadcasting apparatus behind a cardboard and plywood replica of the walls of Windsor Castle, complete with imitation parapets and buttresses.

=== Guests ===
* Present as part of the 14 guests at the Committal burial service.

==== British Royal Family ====
- The Duchess of Windsor*, the Duke's widow
- Queen Elizabeth the Queen Mother, the Duke's sister-in-law
  - The Queen* and the Duke of Edinburgh*, the Duke's niece and her husband (also the Duke's second cousin)
    - The Prince of Wales*, the Duke's great-nephew
    - The Princess Anne, the Duke's great-niece
  - The Princess Margaret, Countess of Snowdon and the Earl of Snowdon, the Duke's niece and her husband
- The Duchess of Gloucester, the Duke's sister-in-law
  - Prince Richard of Gloucester, the Duke's nephew
- The Duke and Duchess of Kent, the Duke's nephew and his wife
- Princess Alexandra, The Hon. Mrs Angus Ogilvy and The Hon. Angus Ogilvy, the Duke's niece and her husband
- Prince Michael of Kent, the Duke's nephew
- The King of Norway, the Duke's first cousin
- The Earl Mountbatten of Burma, the Duke's second cousin

==== Politicians and officeholders ====
- Edward Heath, Prime Minister of the United Kingdom
- Harold Wilson, Leader of the Opposition
- The Earl of Avon, Former Prime Minister of the United Kingdom

==== Clergy ====
- Launcelot Fleming, Dean of Windsor – Officiated the service
- Michael Ramsey, Archbishop of Canterbury – Gave the blessing
- Donald Coggan, Archbishop of York
- Dr Ronnie Selby Wright, Moderator of the General Assembly of the Church of Scotland

==== Members of Edward's Household ====
- John Utter*, Private Secretary to the Duke of Windsor
- Sydney Johnson*, Personal Valet to the Duke of Windsor
