= Wedding of Prince Edward and Wallis Simpson =

1937 British royal wedding

- The Windsors (center) on their wedding day with Herman Rogers (left) and best man Edward Dudley Metcalfe (right).
- Date: 3 June 1937; 89 years ago
- Venue: Château de Candé
- Location: Monts, Indre-et-Loire, France
- Participants: Prince Edward, Duke of Windsor (Formerly Edward VIII); Wallis Simpson

The wedding of Prince Edward, Duke of Windsor, and Wallis Simpson took place on Thursday 3 June 1937 at Château de Candé in France. The bride was a twice-divorced American socialite whose relationship with the groom, formerly King Edward VIII, caused a constitutional crisis which led to his abdication in December 1936.

== Background ==
During her marriage to Ernest Aldrich Simpson, Wallis Simpson was introduced to Edward, then-Prince of Wales, by his then-mistress Thelma, Viscountess Furness. On January 10, 1931, Lady Furness introduced Wallis to Edward at Burrough Court, near Melton Mowbray. Soon, the pair began a relationship. Between 1931 and 1934, he met the Simpsons at various house parties, and Wallis was presented at court.

On January 20, 1936, George V died at Sandringham and Edward ascended the throne as Edward VIII. The next day, he broke royal protocol by watching the proclamation of his accession from a window of St James's Palace, in the company of the still-married Wallis. It was becoming apparent to court and government circles that the new king meant to marry her.

As King of the United Kingdom, Edward was also Supreme Governor of the Church of England. At the time of the proposed marriage (and until 2002), the Church of England disapproved of, and would not perform, the remarriage of divorced people if their former spouse was still alive. Constitutionally, the King was required to be in communion with the Church of England, but his proposed marriage conflicted with the Church's teachings. In November, he consulted with the British prime minister, Stanley Baldwin, on a way to marry Wallis and keep the throne. However, the British and Dominion governments believed that a twice-divorced woman was politically, socially, and morally unsuitable as a prospective consort. Hence, if Edward were to marry Wallis against Baldwin's advice, the government would be required to resign, causing a constitutional crisis.

Wallis's relationship with Edward had become public knowledge in the United Kingdom by early December. She decided to flee the country as the scandal broke, and was driven to the south of France where she stayed at the Villa Lou Viei, near Cannes, the home of her close friends Herman and Katherine Rogers. Determined to marry Wallis, Edward decided he had no option but to abdicate.

Edward signed the Instrument of Abdication on December 10, 1936, in the presence of his three surviving brothers, the Dukes of York, Gloucester and Kent. The Duke of York then became King George VI. On December 11, Edward said in a radio broadcast, "I have found it impossible to carry the heavy burden of responsibility, and to discharge my duties as King as I would wish to do, without the help and support of the woman I love."

== Ceremony ==
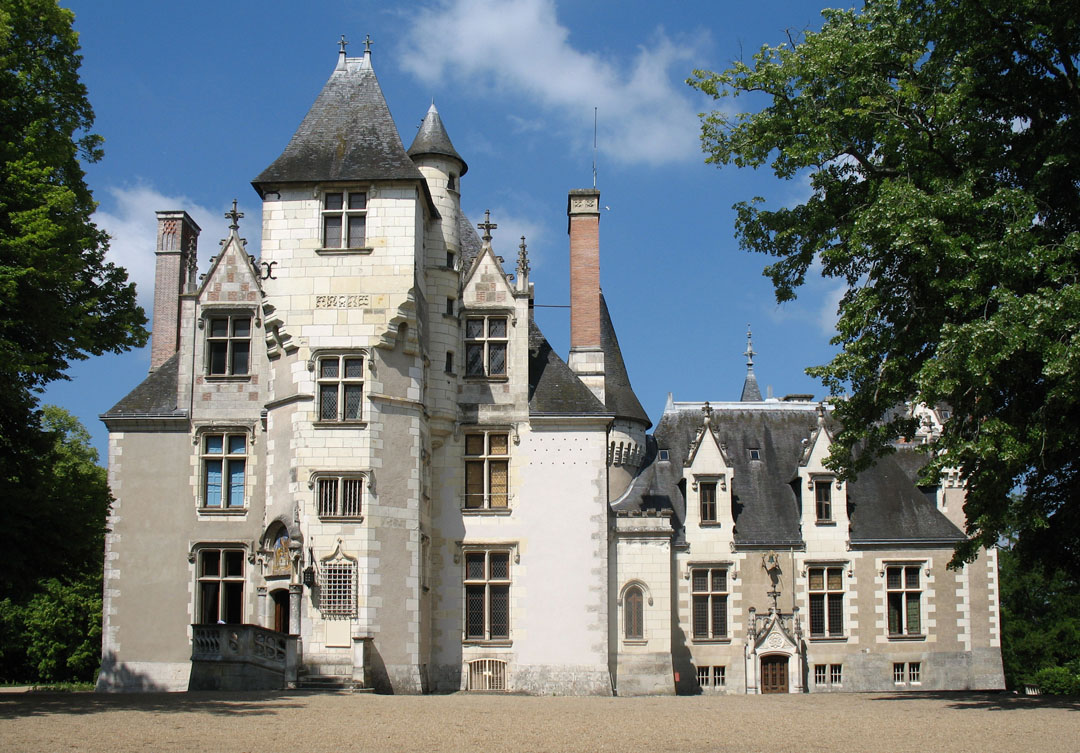
The Château de Candé, the Windsors' wedding venue, south of Tours in France

Edward left Britain for Austria, where he stayed at Schloss Enzesfeld, the home of Baron Eugène and Baroness Kitty de Rothschild. Edward had to remain apart from Wallis until there was no danger of compromising the granting of a decree absolute in her divorce proceedings. Upon her divorce being made final in May 1937, she changed her name by deed poll to Wallis Warfield, resuming her maiden name. The couple reunited in France soon after for their wedding.

Wallis and Edward married on June 3, 1937, at the Château de Candé, lent to them by French millionaire Charles Bedaux. The date would have been King George V's 72nd birthday; Queen Mary thought the wedding had been scheduled for then as a deliberate slight. No member of Edward's family attended.

Under the 1905 French law on the Separation of the Churches and the State, a civil marriage ceremony was required first, performed minutes before the religious ceremony by Charles Mercier, the mayor and village doctor of Monts, the commune in which the Château de Candé is situated. The ceremony was in French, with the bride more fluent than the groom.

While the Church of England refused to sanction the wedding, Robert Anderson Jardine, Vicar of St Paul's, Darlington, offered to perform the service, an offer that was accepted by the couple. Guests included Randolph Churchill, Baron Eugène Daniel von Rothschild, and the best man, Major Fruity Metcalfe.

Wallis' wedding dress was by Mainbocher in the colour dubbed "Wallis blue". Edward presented her with an engagement ring that consisted of an emerald mount in yellow gold set with diamonds, and the sentence "We are ours now" was engraved on it.

Edward was created Duke of Windsor by his brother King George VI prior to the marriage. However, letters patent, issued by the new king and unanimously supported by the Dominion governments, prevented Wallis, now Duchess of Windsor, from sharing her husband's style of "Royal Highness". The King's firm view that the Duchess should not be given a royal title was shared by his mother, Queen Mary, and his wife, Queen Elizabeth.

The couple had their honeymoon at Wasserloenburg Castle in Austria. The marriage produced no children.

== Guests ==
- George Allen, the Duke's solicitor
- Charles and Fern Bedaux, hosts of the wedding
- Randolph Churchill, son of Winston Churchill
- Dudley Forwood, the Duke's equerry
- W. C. Graham and Mrs. Graham; Graham was the British Consul at Nantes, France
- Bessie Montague Merryman, Wallis' maternal aunt, the only relative to attend the wedding
- Major Edward Dudley Metcalfe and Lady Alexandra Metcalfe, the best man and his wife
- Walter Monckton, Attorney General of the Duchy of Cornwall, advisor to the Duke during the abdication crisis
- Herman and Katherine Rogers, friends of the bride
- Baron Eugène von Rothschild and his wife Baroness Rothschild, formerly Catherine "Kitty" Wolf; friends of the bride
- Lady Selby, wife of the Duke's friend Sir Walford Selby, then-British Ambassador to Austria
- Hugh Lloyd Thomas, the Duke's former secretary, then-First Secretary at the British Embassy in Paris
