= Wedding dress of Wallis Simpson =

Dress worn by Wallis Warfield at her wedding to Prince Edward in 1937

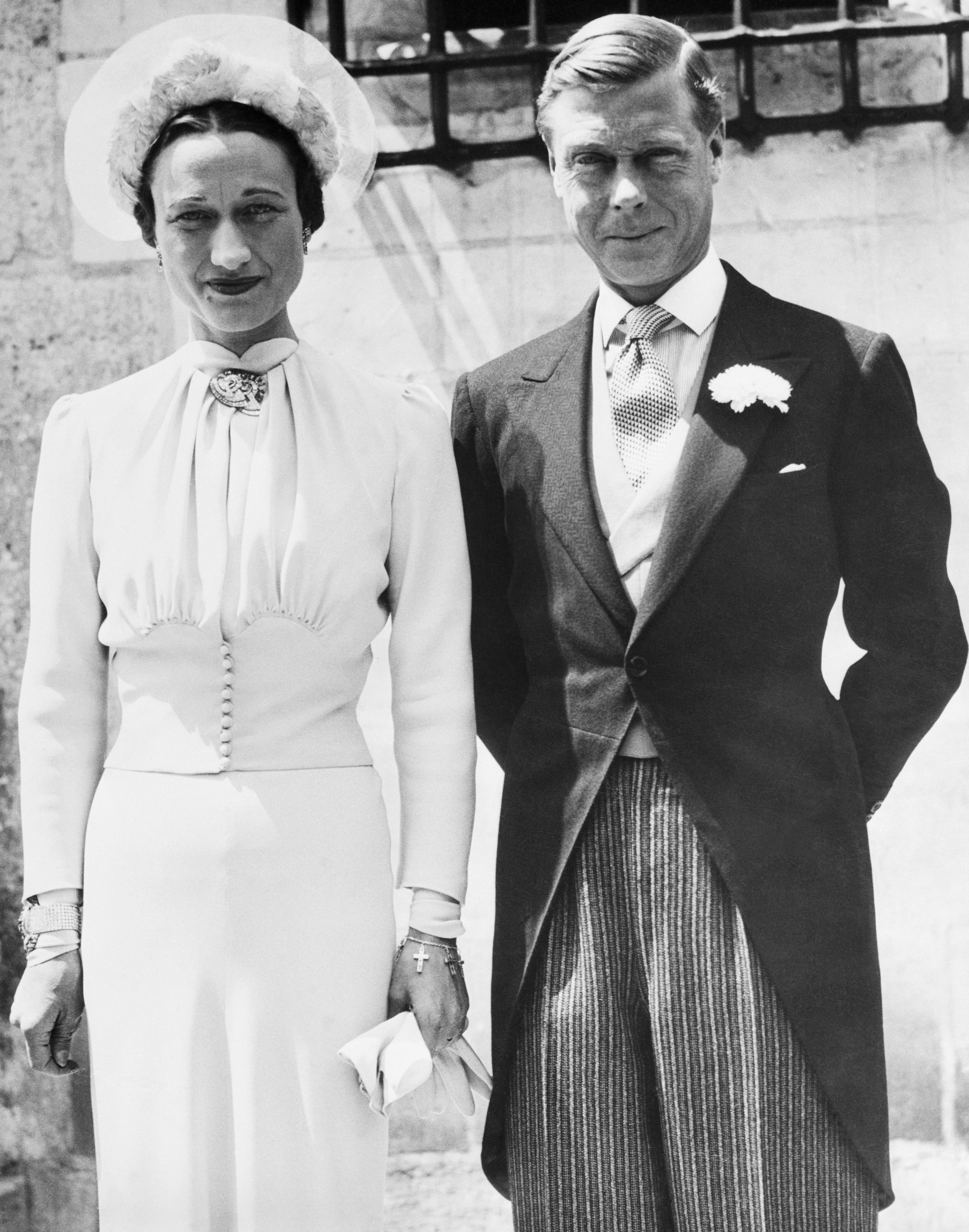
The Windsors on their wedding day

On the event of her wedding to Edward, Duke of Windsor on 3 June 1937 at the Château de Candé, Wallis, Duchess of Windsor (then known as Wallis Warfield) wore a nipped-at-the-waist dress created by Mainbocher in what was termed her signature colour of "Wallis blue" reportedly to match her eyes. Her co-ordinating blue straw hat, by Caroline Reboux, had a halo effect with pale blue tulle and her matching gloves were created from the same blue silk crepe as her dress.

In 1950, Wallis presented the dress to the Metropolitan Museum. More than 25 years after the wedding, it was still regarded as "one of the most photographed, most copied dresses of modern times".

== See also ==
- Lobster dress, part of Wallis's wedding trousseau
- List of individual dresses
- Wedding of Prince Edward and Wallis Simpson
