= Protestant Truth Society =

The Protestant Truth Society (PTS) is a Protestant religious organisation based in London, United Kingdom.

== History of the organization ==
It was founded by John Kensit in 1889, to protest against the influence of Roman Catholicism within the Church of England and the nation.

In 1898 it sent out the first band of "Wickliffe Preachers" to spread the message. To train the "Wickliffe Preachers", it established the Kensit Memorial Bible College in Finchley in 1905; this opened in 1908. The buildings which replaced the original building in Finchley are now occupied by the London (Theological) Seminary.

=== Contemporary activities ===
The PTS is still active and is based in Fleet Street, London. It stores the weapon used in the killing of John Kensit, previously owned by F. E. Smith. It has organised protests against Catholic services at Hampton Court Palace. A bookstore in Fleet Street is a particular ministry maintained by the Society.

== Officers ==
The current chairman of PTS is the Reverend Dominic Stockford, Pastor of Christ Church, Teddington. The Society's current vice-chairman is Rev Edward Malcolm, pastor at St Mary's Church, Castle Street, Reading.

=== Past members ===
One noted member of PTS was the Rev Robert Anderson Jardine, who, in 1937, conducted the wedding of the Duke of Windsor and Wallis Warfield. As a result of this, Jardine was subsequently prevented from returning to his parish duties at Darlington, England. and defended by PTS.

== See also ==
- F. E. Smith, 1st Earl of Birkenhead#Formidable style & high-profile court cases
- Robert Anderson Jardine#An unprecedented marriage
- Alfred Blunt#Speech and abdication crisis
