= Robert Anderson Jardine =

English Anglican priest and author (1878–1950)

The Reverend Robert Anderson Jardine (1878–1950), who published a memoir as R. Anderson Jardine, was an ordained priest of the Church of England and vicar of a parish in Darlington in the north of England. He is best known for performing the religious marriage ceremony of the Duke of Windsor and his fiancée Wallis Simpson, who thus became the Duchess of Windsor, in June 1937, after the legal French civil marriage ceremony had been performed by the Mayor of Monts. This marriage of the former king to a twice-divorced woman with two living ex-husbands – contrary to the teachings of the Church of England – was seen as scandalous by conservative-minded Britons, though others in Britain and elsewhere saw it as the culmination of a great love story. Jardine's offer to carry out the wedding, as a sacrament of the church which opposed it, cost him his career in England.

== An unprecedented marriage ==
Following his abdication from the thrones of all his kingdoms and dominions in December 1936, the Duke of Windsor left England immediately to start the process of marrying Wallis Simpson, "the woman he loved". This process awaited the conclusion of a legally required six-month period to allow the completion of Simpson's divorce from her husband Ernest Simpson. Following the conclusion of this period, it was the former King's strong desire to be married to Wallis under the auspices of the Church of England, the church of which he had been Supreme Governor. However, it was Church law at the time to forbid the re-marriage of divorced partners.

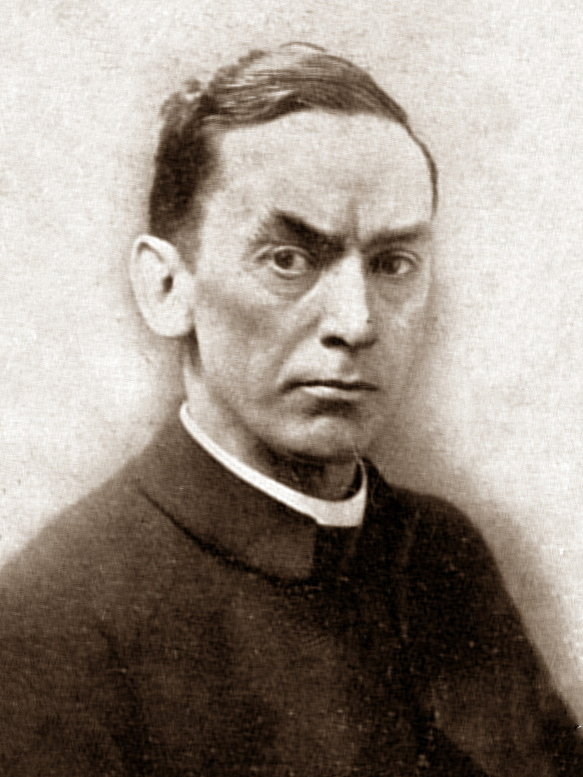
The Bishop of Durham who warned Jardine that he was acting "without episcopal licence"

The dilemma facing the Duke and his fiancée was heavily covered at the time in the British and European press. A hitherto obscure vicar from the North of England, the Rev. Robert Jardine, publicly volunteered to perform the ceremony. Press supporters of the wedding called Jardine, whose working-class parish was dominated by heavy industry, the "poor man's pastor". The marriage was set for 3 June 1937 in the Château de Candé, Wallis's French home in exile.

The Reverend and Mrs Jardine, with their 19-year-old son, Donald, left Darlington on Monday 31 May, but Mrs Jardine and Donald stayed with relations in Letchworth, while Jardine crossed the Channel. The Bishop of Durham, Dr Herbert Hensley Henson, warned Jardine by telegram that he was “without episcopal licence or consent to unite the Duke of Windsor and Mrs. Simpson”. The bishop did not have jurisdiction over Jardine's celebration of the sacraments while on the Continent, and under the immediate circumstances had no choice but to presume that the vicar had the permission of the Anglican bishop with jurisdiction.

Jardine duly performed the religious wedding service shortly after a civil ceremony by the local mayor.

=== Widely varying reactions ===
J. A. Kensit, a leader of the Protestant Truth Society, to which Jardine belonged, commented “Mr Jardine is quite fearless in his advocacy of any cause which he judges right and would pursue his own line regardless of the consequences to himself." A contrary view as to Jardine's motivations is found in the diary of Alan Don, who served as secretary to the then Archbishop of Canterbury, Cosmo Gordon Lang, and as chaplain to Lang, to George V, Edward himself, and George VI, as well as to the Speaker of the House of Commons. Don's diary entry for 8 June 1937 records the contents of a letter from Hensley Henson, the Bishop of Durham to Lang, and Don's reactions to it: Hensley described Jardine as a man "of no education", "heavily in debt" and a "notoriety-seeker of an objectionable kind". Don reflects whether Jardine's motives in volunteering to conduct the service were "financial embarrassment rather than Christian charity".

The wedding was boycotted by almost the entire British establishment; only a small number of guests and a single pool reporter witnessed the wedding, which was conducted by Jardine "in a strong voice". Following the brief ceremony, the couple departed for a honeymoon in Austria, and Jardine returned home to Darlington, unsuccessfully attempting to return to his duties in his parish. However, he was soon made aware that he had performed an act which the church could not accept. His vestry committee resigned, and he was encouraged to follow them. Under pressure, he left England and attempted to emigrate to California. In 1943 Jardine published a memoir, At Long Last, of the unusual event.

The marriage ceremony of the Duke and Duchess was not deemed to be a royal wedding. Letters patent, published just before the ceremony in the London Gazette as the Depriving Act of 1937, explicitly stated that the title of Royal Highness, which conveyed precedence, would be enjoyed by the Duke but not by the Duchess.

== Later life ==
Jardine's short-lived attempt to emigrate to California found him little work, while he tried unsuccessfully to capitalise on his fleeting fame.

=== Controversial statements ===
Some public statements which he made to American audiences — to the effect that he judged that there were circumstances in which the Duke of Windsor might have the throne restored to him, and referring to Archbishop of Canterbury Cosmo Lang as "an ecclesiastical cad" — were seen as inflammatory. While the Nazi threat increased, he also went to the Duchess of Windsor's hometown of Baltimore, Maryland and declared that the Duke of Windsor was a champion of peace in Europe. He ministered for a short while at a Downtown Hollywood church named the 'Windsor Cathedral' — which Jardine designated a 'shrine to love' — but this ministry was curtailed by visa problems which obliged him to leave the United States. He and his wife Maud spent most of the war years in Mexico, penniless.

=== Recovering status ===
Years later he somewhat recovered ecclesiastical status by becoming bishop-designate of the South African Episcopal Church in Cape Town, and he and Mrs. Jardine returned to the UK to settle their affairs there, but he died suddenly in Bedford in March 1950 before he could take up the new post. He is buried in an unmarked grave at Foster Hill Road Cemetery, Bedford.

== See also ==
- Abdication of Edward VIII
