= Monsoon Books =

Independent publishing firm in Singapore

- Founded: 2002; 24 years ago
- Founder: Philip Tatham
- Country of origin: United Kingdom
- Headquarters location: Burrough Court
- Distribution: Simon & Schuster (US)
- Publication types: books
- Official website: www.monsoonbooks.co.uk

Monsoon Books (publishing under the monsoon imprint) is an independent publishing firm established in Singapore in 2002 and incorporated in the United Kingdom in 2016. Monsoon Books is based in Burrough Court in Leicestershire, UK.

Established by Briton Philip Tatham, Monsoon Books publishes English-language fiction (general and literary) and narrative nonfiction (biography and autobiography, memoir, true crime, travelog and literary journalism), with Asian, particularly Southeast Asian, themes. It publishes works set in Singapore, Indonesia, Malaysia, Thailand, Philippines, India, China, Japan, Brunei, Cambodia, Vietnam and Myanmar.

Authors published by Monsoon Books include Nigel Barley, Anthony English, Stephen Leather, Warren Olson, Su-Chen Christine Lim, David McMillan (smuggler), Jack Reynolds, Pieter Wilhelm, Robert Yeo, Cyril Wong, Felix Cheong and Kirpal Singh.

Monsoon Books is a member of the Independent Publishers Guild UK.
