= Enzesfeld-Lindabrunn =

- Municipality
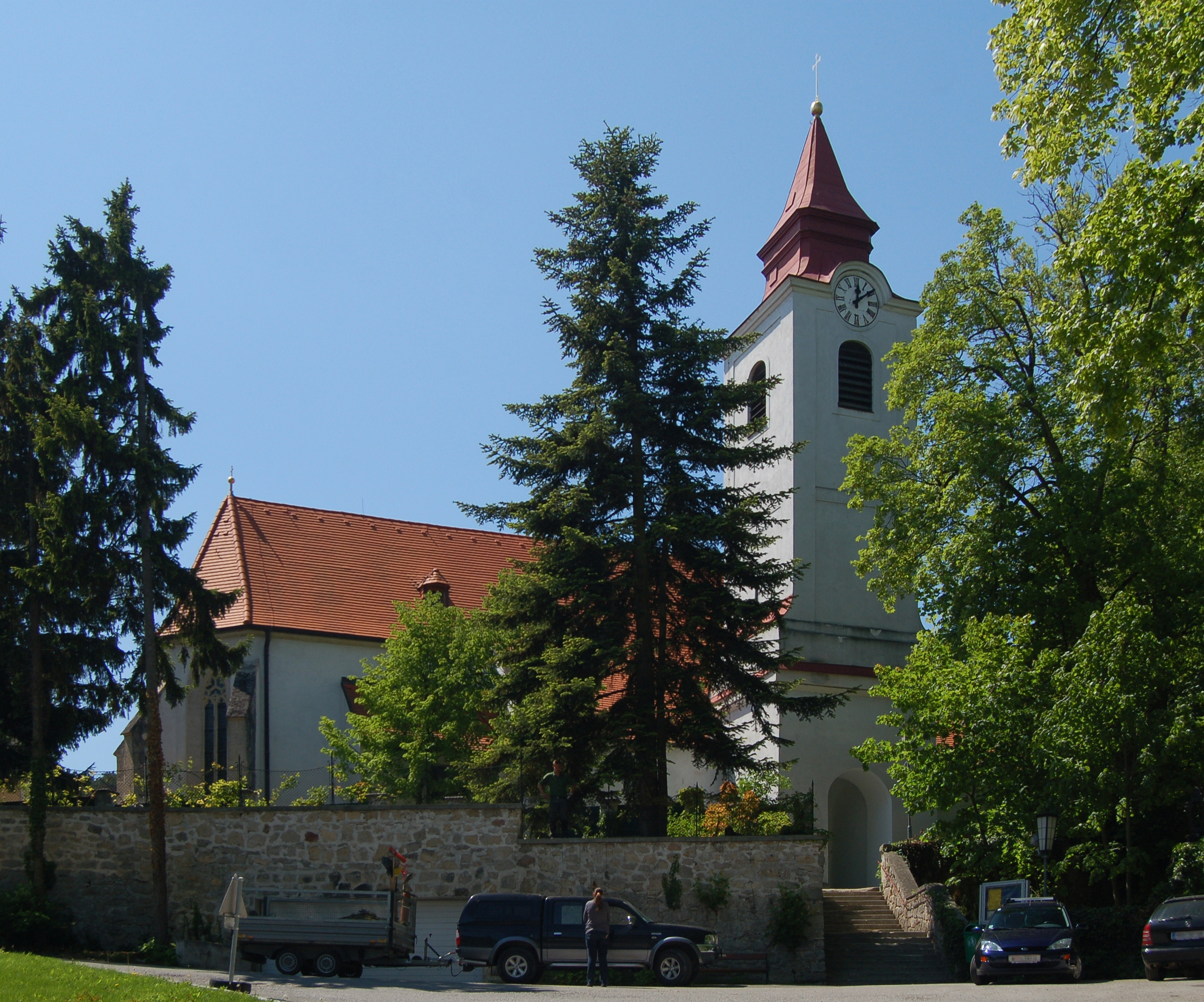
- The catholic church in Enzesfeld

- Coat of arms

- Location within Austria
- Coordinates: 47°55′N 16°10′E
- Country: Austria
- State: Lower Austria
- District: Baden

Government
  - Mayor: Stefan Rabl (Liste Schneider)

Area
  - Total: 15.78 km^{2} (6.09 sq mi)
- Elevation: 314 m (1,030 ft)

Population (2018-01-01)
  - Total: 4,174
  - Density: 264.5/km^{2} (685.1/sq mi)
- Time zone: UTC+1 (CET)
  - Summer (DST): UTC+2 (CEST)
- Postal code: 2544, 2551, 2552
- Area code: 02256
- Website: www.enzesfeld-lindabrunn.at

Enzesfeld-Lindabrunn is a town in the district of Baden in Lower Austria in Austria. The city was governed by social democracy until 2010, and since 2010 a citizens' list of Franz Schneider has been in power.

== History ==
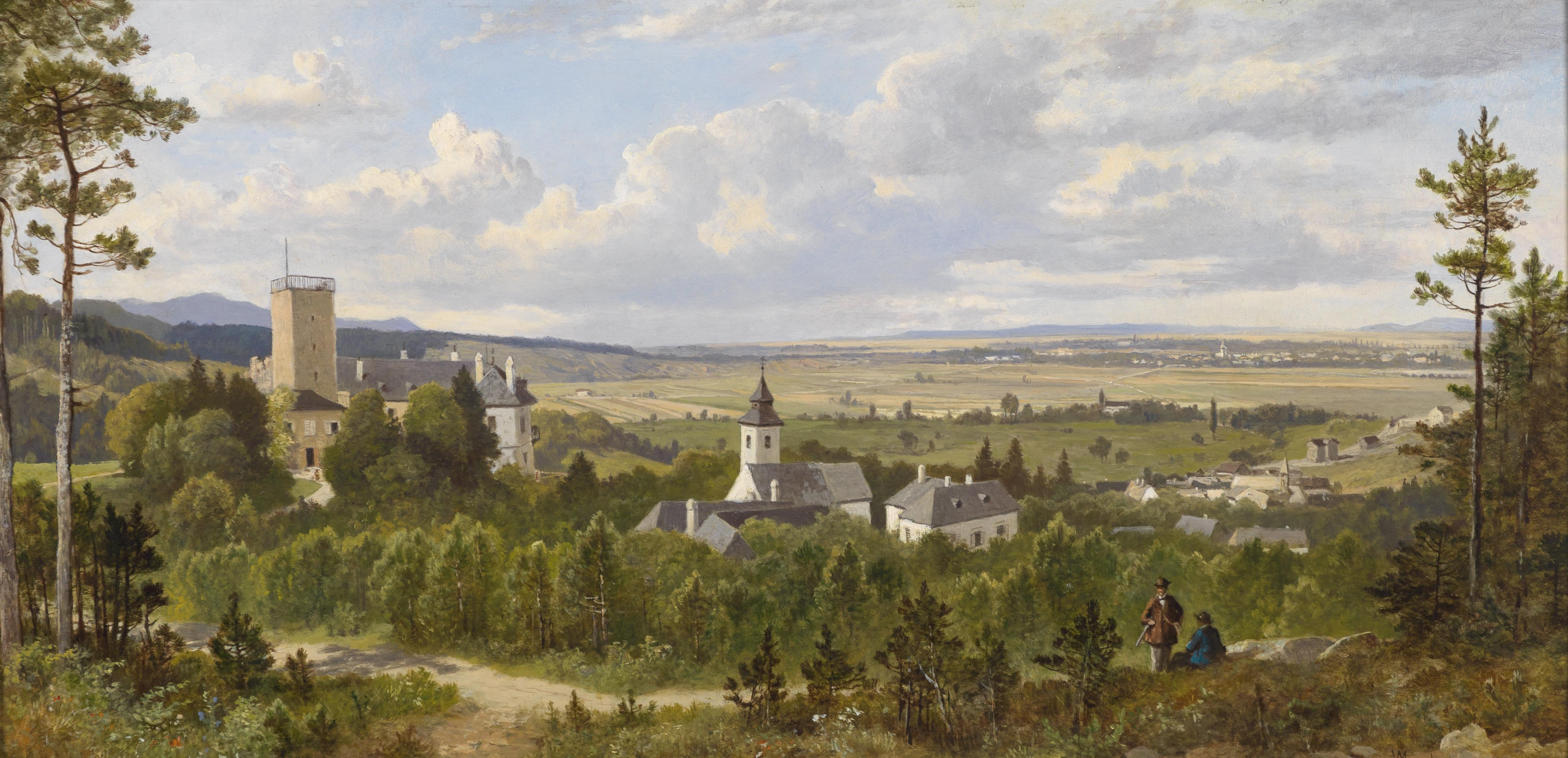
Painting of view of Enzesfeld (including Enzesfeld Castle) with a view to Lindabrunn, by Leopold Munsch, 1888

During the Second World War there were several labor camps for the factories in Enzesfeld. The factories were for war production and were often bombed by the Royal Air Force. In 1944 there was a large explosion in a factory that could be felt as far away as Wiener Neustadt and cost lives. Shortly before the end of the war, prisoners in the work camps in Enzesfeld were still being murdered by the SS. The Soviet Army liberated the communities of Enzesfeld and Lindabrunn. The NSDAP mayor of Enzesfeld Karl Gschiel flees to Carinthia and never returns. Shortly after the war, his villa was set on fire by the population and burned down, it was finally demolished.

In the post-war period there was a strong SPÖ in Enzesfeld and Lindabrunn. In the first years even KPÖ local councils.

The city was founded in 1970 from the communities of Enzesfeld and Lindabrunn. Erich Nebel (SPÖ) ruled until 1985, and Erich Fangl (SPÖ) until 2010. In 2005, the SPÖ had the greatest success, 19 out of 25 mandates. In the 1990s and 2000s there was a list of citizens with the names: Citizens list Enzesfeld-Lindabrunn. In 2009, the local Social Democratic party fell out and the SPÖ municipal council from Lindabrunn founded his list of citizens, Liste Schneider. In the 2010 elections, he was able to bring many Red voters to his list and the Enzesfeld-Lindabrunn citizens' list merged with the Schneider list. Franz Schneider becomes mayor in 2010.

After 2020: The municipal council currently consists of 14 mandates from the List Schneider citizens' list of Mayor Franz Schneider. The opposition is formed by the SPÖ with 10 mandates from Karin Scheele, she is also a member of the Austrian Social Democratic Party in the Lower Austrian state parliament. The ÖVP of Deputy Mayor Alexander Schermann has 3 mandates. The FPÖ had seats in the local council up until the 2020 elections, but has since lost importance and lost most of the voters. This is a follow-up to the Ibiza affair of 2019.

On June 1, 2023, Stefan Rabl was elected mayor. He is the successor of Franz Schneider.

Historical population
Year	Pop.	±%
1971	3,230	—
1981	3,298	+2.1%
1991	3,589	+8.8%
2001	4,020	+12.0%
2011	4,155	+3.4%

== See also ==
- Enzesfeld Castle
