= AS Monts =

French football club

Monts
- Full name: Association Sportive Monts
- Founded: 1924
- Ground: Stade des Griffonnes, Monts, Indre-et-Loire
- Chairman: Pascal Tortereau
- Manager: Hervé Bruno
- League: Promotion d'Honneur de Centre
Home colours

Association Sportive Monts is a French association football club founded in 1924. They are based in the town of Monts, Indre-et-Loire and their home stadium is the des Griffonnes. As of the 2009–10 season, the club plays in the Promotion d'Honneur de Centre, the eighth tier of French football.
