= Monts, Indre-et-Loire =

Monts
- Commune
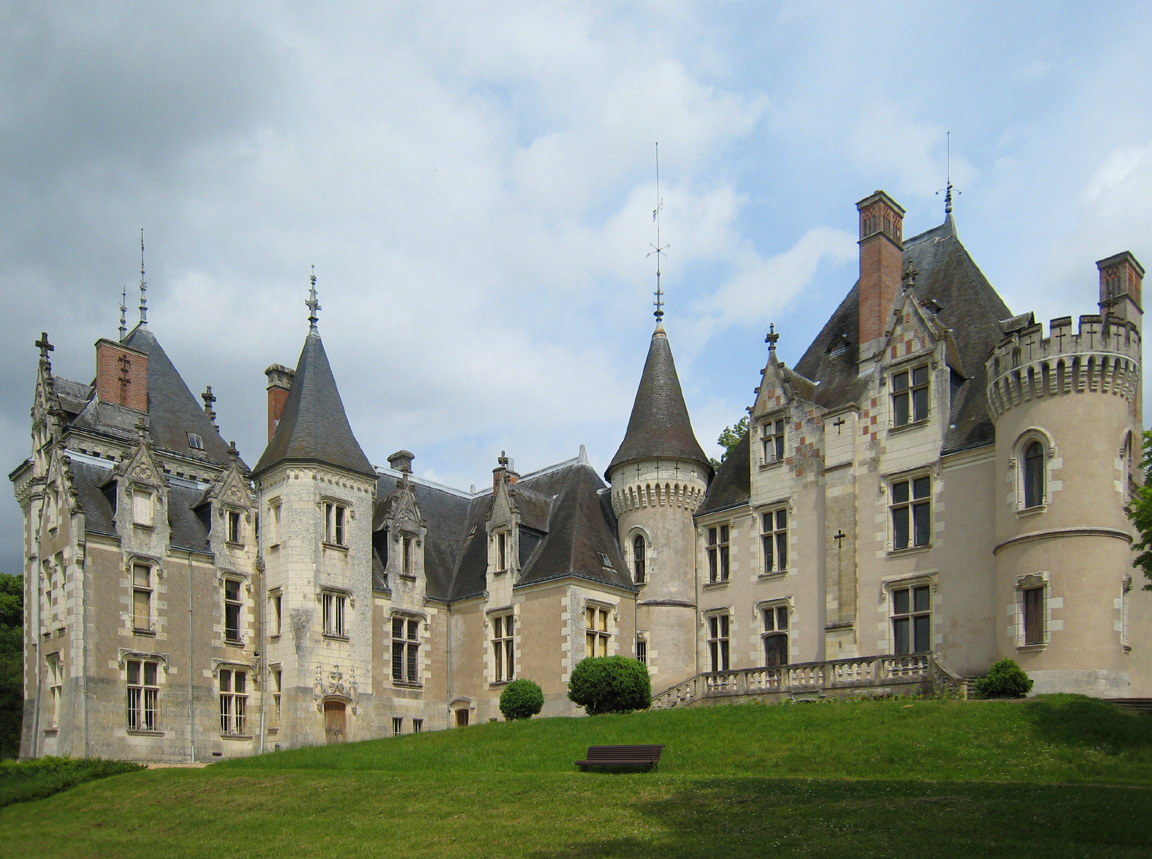
- Château de Candé

- Coat of arms
- Location of Monts
- Location within France Location within Centre-Val de Loire
- Coordinates: 47°16′41″N 0°37′31″E
- Country: France
- Region: Centre-Val de Loire
- Department: Indre-et-Loire
- Arrondissement: Tours
- Canton: Monts

Government
  - Mayor (2020–2026): Laurent Richard
- Area^{1}: 27.28 km^{2} (10.53 sq mi)
- Highest elevation: 99 m (325 ft)
- Lowest elevation: 47 m (154 ft)
- Population (2023): 8,080
  - Density: 296/km^{2} (767/sq mi)
- Time zone: UTC+01:00 (CET)
  - Summer (DST): UTC+02:00 (CEST)
- INSEE/Postal code: 37159 /37260
- ^{1} French Land Register data, which excludes lakes, ponds, glaciers > 1 km^{2} (0.386 sq mi or 247 acres) and river estuaries.

Monts (French pronunciation: [mɔ̃]) is a commune in the Indre-et-Loire department in central France.

== Historic buildings ==
A number of historic buildings are located within the municipality.

It was at the Château de Candé in Monts on 3 June 1937 that The Duke of Windsor, formerly King Edward VIII, married the twice-divorced Wallis Warfield Simpson for whom he had abdicated the throne of Britain and the Empire; the building thus became the backdrop to widely publicized photographs of the wedding. The Château was owned at the time by the controversial Franco-American management consultant Charles Bedaux; previously, the Château was owned by the wealthy Drake family which made profound modifications to the building's structure. The property includes a very large pond.

Another historic building in the village is the Manoir de l'Ortière, dating from the XV century.

The local railway station — the Gare de Monts — was opened in 1851; the building has a striking neo-classical façade.

== Local sports activities ==
The village has an association football team playing in the Promotion d'Honneur de Centre, the eighth division of the French football league system. They are called AS Monts. They were founded in 1924 and play at the Stade des Griffonnes. Their kit is blue.

== Population ==
Historical population

Year	Pop.	±% p.a.
1793	1,102	—
1800	1,125	+0.30%
1806	1,274	+2.09%
1821	1,343	+0.35%
1831	1,155	−1.50%
1836	1,178	+0.40%
1841	1,212	+0.57%
1846	1,297	+1.36%
1851	1,205	−1.46%
1856	1,209	+0.07%
1861	1,317	+1.73%
1866	1,409	+1.36%
1872	1,434	+0.29%
1876	1,652	+3.60%
1881	1,551	−1.25%
1886	1,522	−0.38%
1891	1,503	−0.25%
1896	1,514	+0.15%
1901	1,430	−1.14%

Year	Pop.	±% p.a.
1906	1,502	+0.99%
1911	1,561	+0.77%
1921	1,582	+0.13%
1926	1,486	−1.24%
1931	1,515	+0.39%
1936	1,649	+1.71%
1946	1,784	+0.79%
1954	2,129	+2.23%
1962	2,053	−0.45%
1968	3,506	+9.33%
1975	4,480	+3.56%
1982	5,421	+2.76%
1990	6,221	+1.74%
1999	6,514	+0.51%
2007	6,973	+0.85%
2012	7,246	+0.77%
2017	7,794	+1.47%
2023	8,080	+0.60%

Source: EHESS and INSEE (1968-2023)

== See also ==
- Communes of the Indre-et-Loire department
