= Nigel Barley (anthropologist) =

British anthropologist (born 1947)

Nigel Frederick Barley (born 1947) is a British anthropologist known for his books based on his anthropological field work, which have been treated as travel writing. His first book The Innocent Anthropologist (1983), was an account of field work in Cameroon and was positively reviewed.

He later conducted field work in Indonesia. Since 2003, he has expanded his writing career. He divides his time between the United Kingdom and Indonesia. His book Not a Hazardous Sport (1989) was about his research in Tana Toraja. He has since written numerous other works, including fiction. He wrote a historical novel Island of Demons (2009), loosely based on the German artist Walter Spies, who lived for most of his career in Bali.

== Biography ==
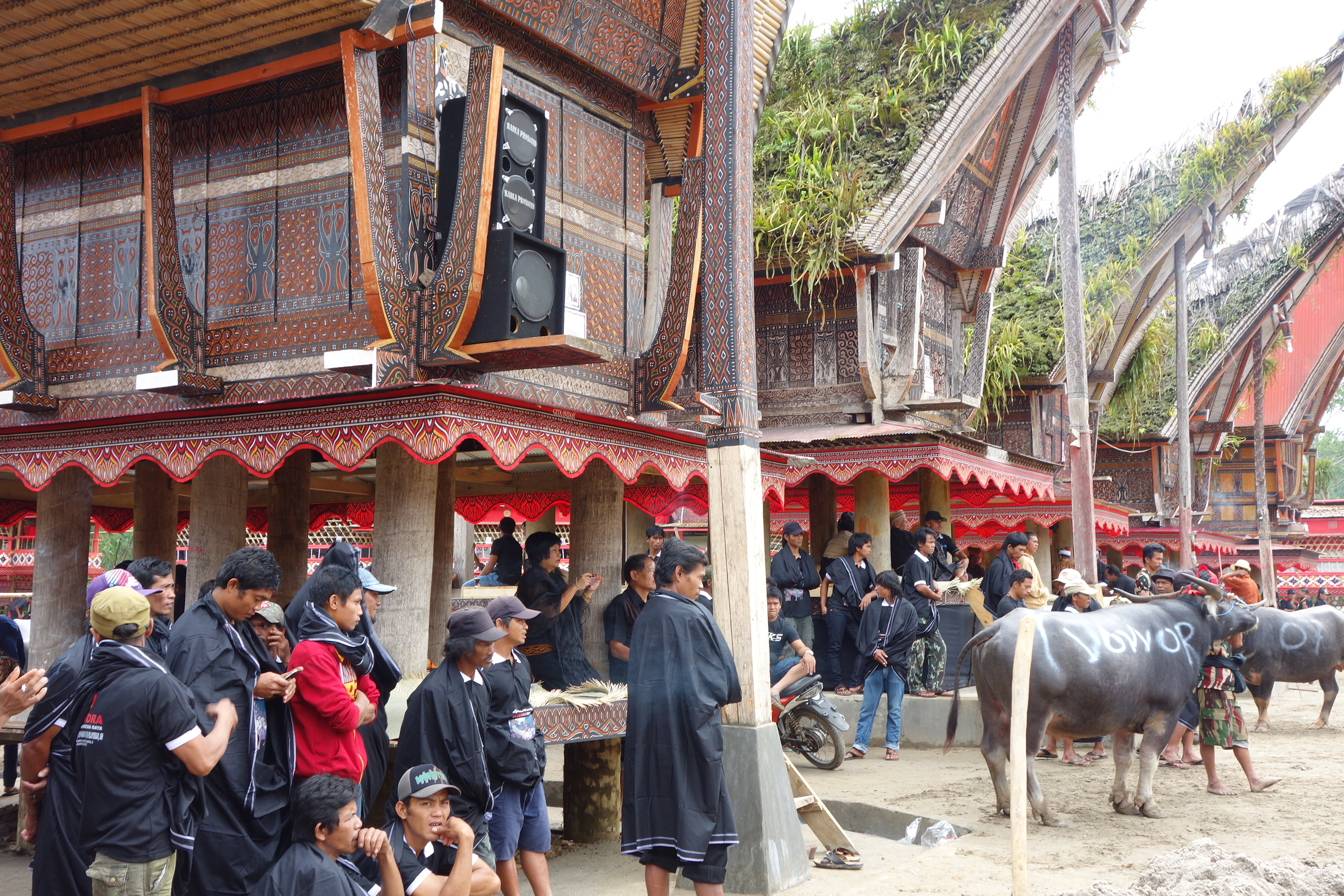
Barley spent some years living in Tana Toraja, Sulawesi, studying the local customs.

Barley was born in Kingston upon Thames in 1947. He gained his bachelor's degree in modern languages at Cambridge University, and his doctorate in social anthropology at Oxford University. He worked for some years as an academic at University College London, teaching anthropology. He served for most of his career at the British Museum, from 1980 to 2003, as an assistant keeper of Ethnography. During this period, he also conducted anthropological field work in distant locations.

Barley wrote some travel books about his time in anthropological research. His first memoir, The Innocent Anthropologist (1983), gave a popular account of anthropological field work among the Dowayo people of Cameroon. He next worked as an anthropologist in Indonesia. His first book based on his time there was the humorous Not a Hazardous Sport (1989), describing his experiences in Tana Toraja in the mountains of central Sulawesi. He has written on many other subjects including Sir Stamford Raffles, the founder of Singapore, and Sir James Brooke, the "white rajah" of Sarawak.

He has been twice nominated for the Travelex Writer of the Year Award. In 2002, he won the Foreign Press Association prize for travel writing.

== Reception ==
=== The Innocent Anthropologist ===
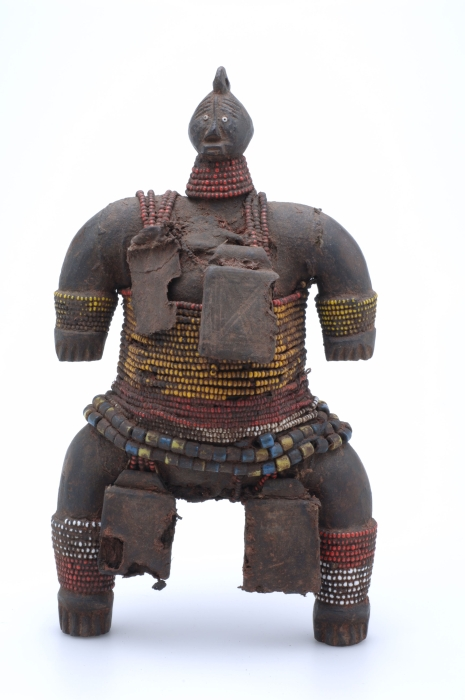
Wooden fertility doll with beaded cords and amulets from the Dowayo people of West Africa studied by Barley. TropenMuseum collection.

The journalist and author Ryszard Kapuscinski wrote that whereas "modern literature", as represented by works nominated in French literary awards, largely failed to talk about people from other cultures, Barley's Innocent Anthropologist, like Colin Thubron's Behind the Wall and Bruce Chatwin's The Songlines did "show us the modern cultures, ideas and behaviour of people who live in different geographical latitudes and who believe in different gods from us", even if these books were not considered to be "real literature" by some within the literary elite.

Anthropologist Tony Waters described Innocent Anthropologist as a memorably written account. In a review in Ethnography, he said that it is the book he recommends to students for an understanding of "field work, ethnography, and cultural anthropology." Waters says he truly admires the book as it gives a realistic idea of field experience, but "Oddly, I find few anthropologists who have read it, much less heard of it."

=== Not a Hazardous Sport ===
Tim Hannigan, reflecting on Not a Hazardous Sport in the Asian Review of Books, wrote that British travel writing has had a "preeminent court jester" in each generation, from Robert Byron in the 1930s, Eric Newby in the 1950s, and Redmond O'Hanlon in the 1980s. But in his view, Barley's writing has survived the test of time "in a postcolonial world" far better than O'Hanlon's, not least because, as an anthropologist, his observations on the people he wrote about were underpinned by "professional fieldwork ... proper language training and research". Hannigan found Barley's prose "effortlessly jaunty .. with an air of permanent good-natured amusement. But there's also the faintly discernible trace of inexplicable melancholy common to the best of British comic travel writing". All in all, Hannigan considered it an excellent travel book, both a "vicarious journey", entertaining, and valuable for steering the reader "away from complacency".

== Bibliography ==
=== Africa ===
- Symbolic structures. An exploration of the culture of the Dowayos, Cambridge University Press, Cambridge 1983 ISBN 0-521-24745-4
- The Innocent Anthropologist: Notes From a Mud Hut, 1983. (Reissued Long Grove, Illinois: Waveland Press, 2000; Reissued London: Eland Books, 2011)
- Adventures in a Mud Hut: An Innocent Anthropologist Abroad, Vanguard Press, 1984. (ISBN 0-8149-0880-2)
- A Plague of Caterpillars: A Return to the African Bush, Viking Press, 1986. (ISBN 0-670-80704-4)
- Ceremony: An Anthropologist's Misadventures in the African Bush, Henry Holt, 1987. (ISBN 0-8050-0142-5)
- The Coast, 1991. (ISBN 0-14-012213-3)
- Smashing Pots. 1994.
- Arts du Nigeria- Revisites, Musee Barbier-Mueller, Geneva 2015.
- Your Obedient Servant: Richard Lander and the River Niger, 2025. (ISBN 979-8277541425)

=== Southeast Asia ===
- Not a Hazardous Sport, Henry Holt, 1989. (ISBN 0-8050-0960-4)

--- reprinted in USA as Toraja: Misadventures of a Social Anthropologist in Sulawesi, Indonesia

- The Duke of Puddle Dock: Travels in the Footsteps of Stamford Raffles, Henry Holt, 1992. (ISBN 0-8050-1968-5)
- Grave Matters: A Lively History of Death around the World, Henry Holt, 1997. (ISBN 0-8050-4824-3)
- White Rajah: A Biography of Sir James Brooke, Little, Brown, 2003. (ISBN 0-3168-5920-6)
- Rogue Raider: The tale of Captain Lauterbach and the Singapore Mutiny, Monsoon Books, 2006. (ISBN 981-05-5949-6)
- Island of Demons, novel loosely based on painter Walter Spies, Monsoon Books, 2009. (ISBN 978-981-08-2381-8)
- The Devil's Garden: Love and War in Singapore under the Japanese Flag, Monsoon Books, 2011. (ISBN 978-981-4358-42-2)
- Snow Over Surabaya, Monsoon Books, 2017. (ISBN 978-1912049004)
- The Man Who Collected Women, Monsoon Books, 2020. (ISBN 1912049740), (ISBN 978-1912049745)
- Unfinished: Ranee Sylvia of Sarawak, 2025. (ISBN 979-8316822515)

=== Other ===
- Even: A Novella of Revenge and Misfortune, 2012.(ISBN 9781456620196)
- Requiescat: A Cat's Life at the British Museum, 2013. (ISBN 978-1-4566-1994-7)
- Coronation Chicken, 2014. (ISBN 9781456621971)
- The Glass Armonica, 2018. (ASIN B07CBQWD7X)
- Over The Hills: The Welsh Great Escape, 2019. (ISBN 9781676646204)
- Purple Passages: Sebastian Melmoth on Oscar Wilde, 2022. (ISBN 9798548334718)
- The Panther of the Veld: Fritz Joubert Duquesne, 2023. (ISBN 9798389824874)
- Catcalls and Orange Peel: Charlie Chaplin, 2024. (ISBN 9798323967506)
- Scratching Fanny of Cock Lane and the Glass Armonica, 2024. (ISBN 979-8333460707)
