= John Kensit =

English religious leader and polemicist (1853–1902)

- Born: 12 February 1853; London, England
- Died: 8 October 1902 (aged 49); Liverpool, England
- Resting place: Hampstead Cemetery, London
- Occupations: Protestant Lecturer & Publisher
- Spouse: Edith Mary Kensit (née Eves)
- Children: Edith Elizabeth, John Alfred Kensit, Amelia Louisa, Florence Mary
- Parent(s): John Kensit, Elizabeth Ann

John Kensit (12 February 1853 – 8 October 1902) was an English religious leader and polemicist. He concentrated on a struggle against Anglo-Catholic tendencies in the Church of England.

== Life history ==
Kensit, a bookseller from London and a practising Anglican, evidenced in his lifetime distinct persuasions in Anglican church practice which were markedly distinct from one another. He had in his youth been a chorister at St Lawrence Jewry and attracted to the Ritualist elements of church services, but in later life became a Protestant leader and anti-Ritualist campaigner. In 1889 he founded the Protestant Truth Society to oppose what he saw as the excessive influence of the Oxford Movement on the Church of England, despite the Public Worship Regulation Act 1874. In the 1970s Kensit continued to be memorialized by Belfast's St Paul's Church Defenders Junior Loyal Orange Lodge 869.

=== Activities as a polemicist ===
Kensit, along with other campaigners, such as William Harcourt, believed the government and the courts were not dealing with ritualism in the Church of England vigorously enough. Kensit would deal with the issue by attending churches where he believed Ritualism was still being conducted or appear at courts where Ritualist cases were being tried, and would vocally disrupt proceedings.

==== Incident at St. Cuthbert's, Earls Court - memorialized by misericord ====
On Good Friday, 15 April 1898, Kensit with some of his followers attended the service at St Cuthbert's, Earls Court, and 'seized the crucifix, and, holding it aloft, said in a clear and distinct voice, "I denounce this idolatry in the Church of England; may God help me".' He and his supporters were with difficulty ejected from the church. Kensit was charged, convicted and fined £3 (about £350 today), but acquitted on appeal at the Clerkenwell Quarter Sessions, though without costs. Kensit's involvement in the Good Friday incident was caricatured on the misericord in the vicar's stall in the Sanctuary of St Cuthbert's which depicts Kensit with protruding ass's ears.

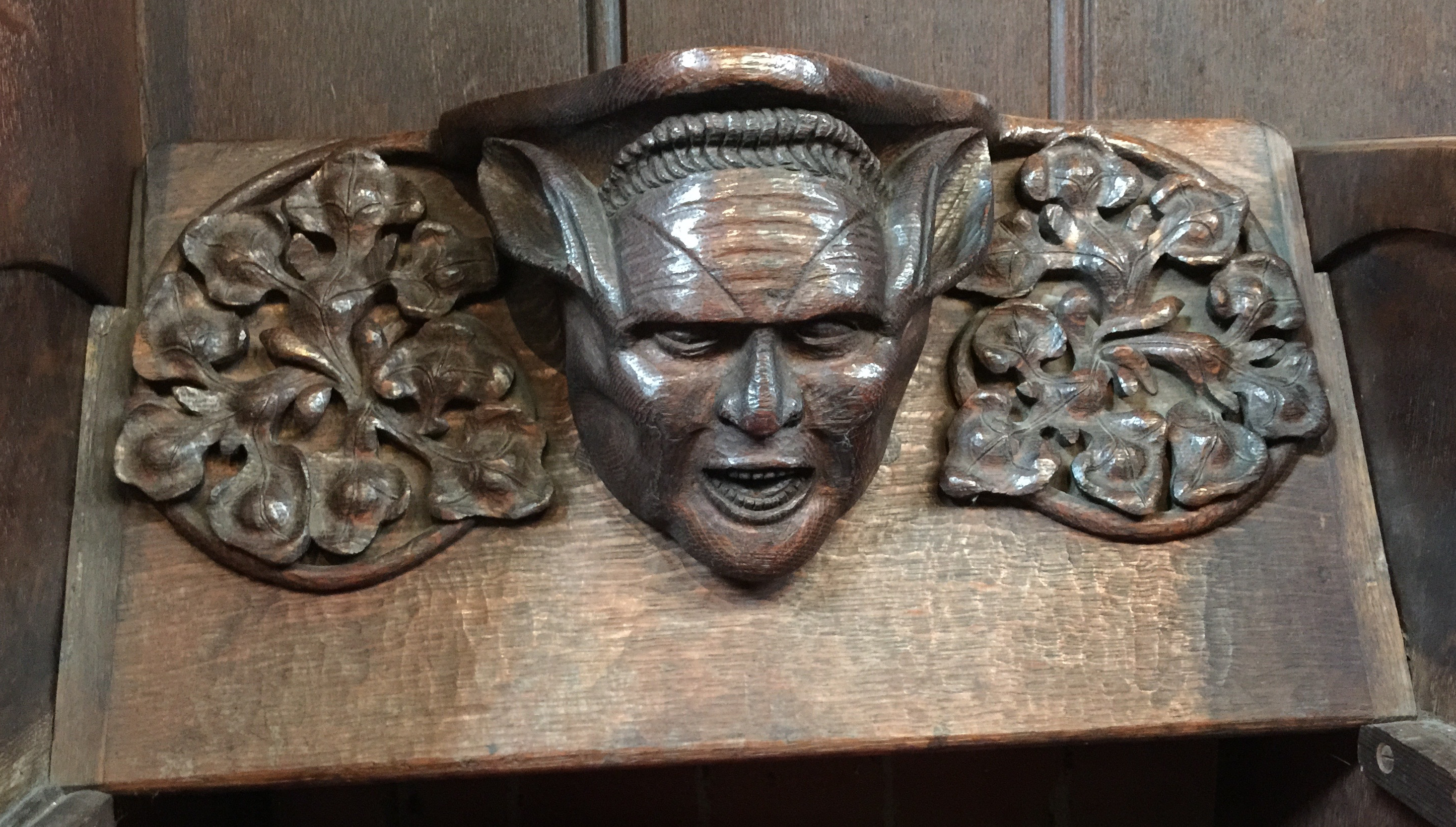
Kensit misericord at St Cuthbert's, Earls Court

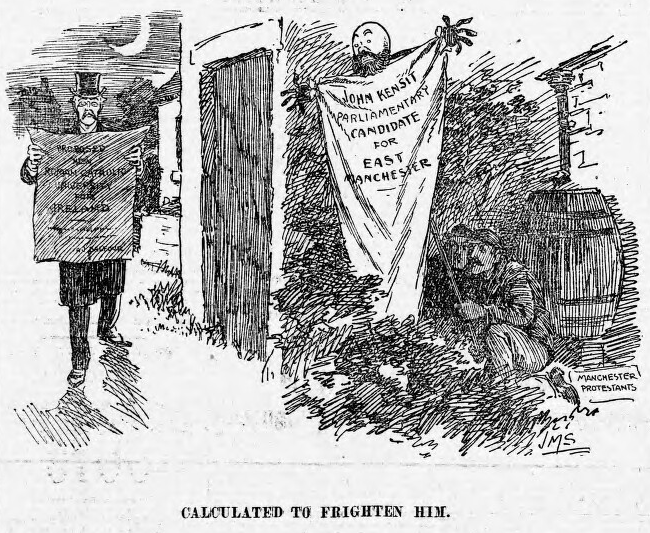
"Calculated to Frighten Him" (1899) J. M. Staniforth; a scarecrow, representing Kensit, readied to frighten Arthur Balfour

==== Political aspirations ====
Kensit made international news in 1899 when he announced that he would stand as a candidate in the 1900 general election in Manchester East against Arthur Balfour, the Leader of the House of Commons.

In fact, he stood in Brighton as the 'Protestant' candidate where he received 4,693 votes (24.5%), finishing third behind the two Conservative candidates.

== Death controversy and trial ==
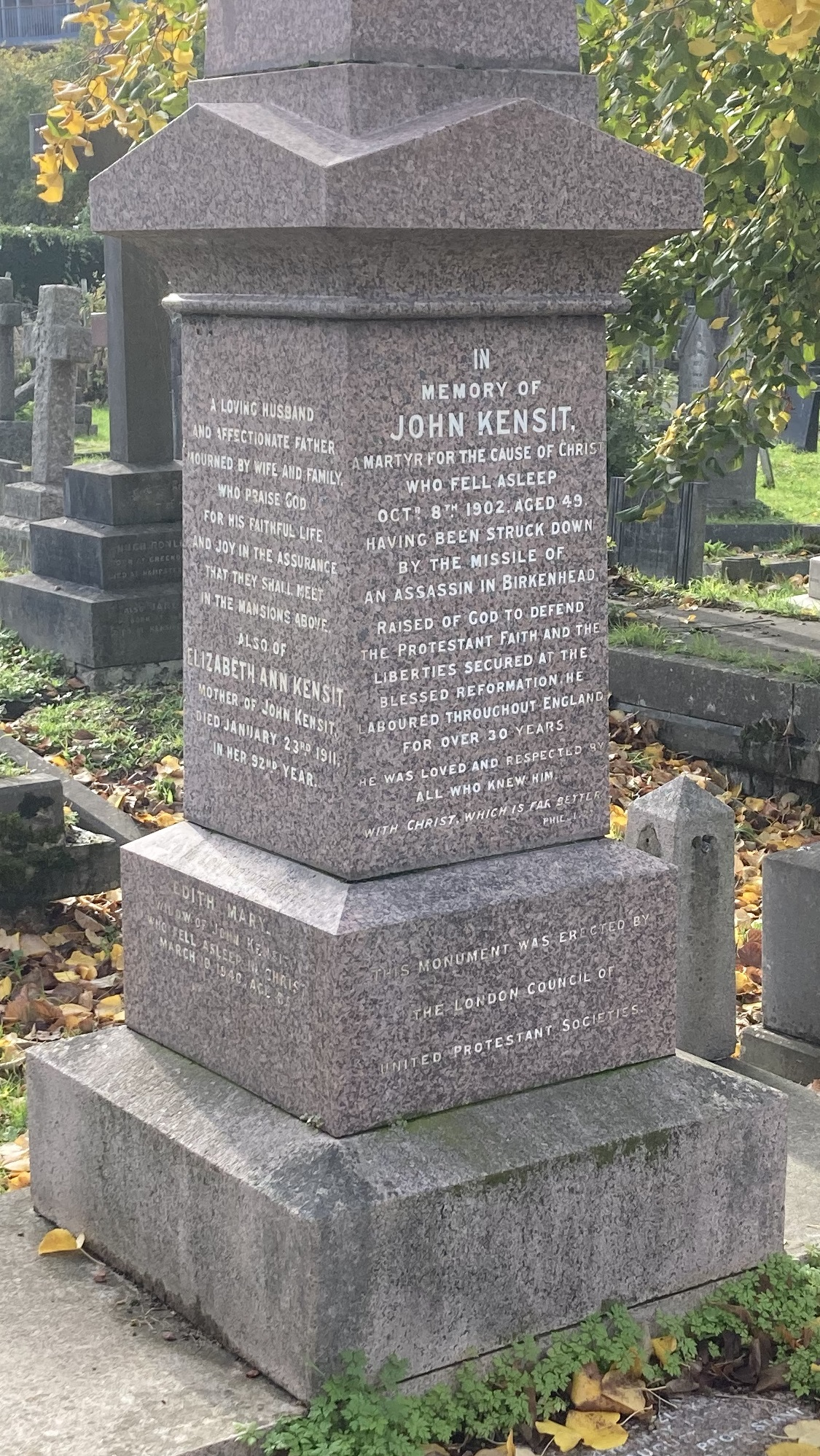
Grave of John Kensit in Hampstead Cemetery

Kensit died aged 49 on 8 October 1902, of pneumonia and blood poisoning, the result of a wound he received in September that year when he was struck by a chisel thrown by a protester as he arrived at a meeting in Birkenhead. A local labourer, John McKeever, was arrested and tried for Kensit's murder but was acquitted after a four-day trial in December 1902. Kensit was buried at Hampstead Cemetery.

A religious medal in his memory was struck in 1927 by the Protestant Truth Society, which also preserved at its Fleet Street offices McKeever's chisel, once owned by F. E. Smith who had been part of the original prosecution team in McKeever's unsuccessful murder trial.

== See also ==
- F. E. Smith, 1st Earl of Birkenhead#Formidable style & high-profile court cases
