= London Seminary =

Coordinates: 51.5956°N 0.2053°W

London Seminary (formerly London Theological Seminary) is an evangelical vocational training college located in Finchley, London, England.

== Overview ==
London Theological Seminary was founded in 1977 by a group of ministers led by Martyn Lloyd-Jones, who was chairman of the Board of Trustees until his death in 1981. It trains preachers and pastors for the Christian ministry, and since the late 1990s has also provided ongoing study and support for those in ministry, including pastors and elders, women's workers and church planters. Its theological position is Conservative Evangelical in the Reformed tradition, and it only admits men on the seminary's flagship Pastoral Training Course. However, the seminary also runs a separate women's course called Flourish. Students are drawn from both the UK and overseas and from various denominational backgrounds. London Seminary used to be licensed by the Home Office to enrol international students and in past years students have come from Argentina, Armenia, Brazil, Burma, Cameroon, Canada, China, Ethiopia, France, Germany, Honduras, India, Italy, Korea, Madagascar, Malaysia, Nepal, Netherlands, Nigeria, Pakistan, Peru, Philippines, Poland, Portugal, Russia, South Africa, Spain, Sri Lanka, Switzerland, and the USA. However, this is now no longer the case, and overseas students can typically only study remotely.

Its name was shortened to London Seminary in September 2016.

The college is housed in buildings formerly occupied by the Kensit Memorial Bible College, which are still owned by the Kensit Memorial Trust, part of the Protestant Truth Society.

== Pastors' Academy ==
The Pastors' Academy (formerly The John Owen Centre for theological study) is an associated organisation situated at London Seminary. Puritan Reformed Theological Seminary, USA provides its London-based Master of Theology degree course through the Pastors' Academy. The Pastors' Academy also provides advanced classes in Hebrew and Greek, Pastoral support, study projects and breaks, and conferences and study days on theological, Biblical, pastoral and ethical topics.

== Faculty, Regular Lecturers and Former Lecturers ==
- Bill James (Principal and Lecturer in Several Subjects)
- Dr. David Green (Vice-Principal and Lecturer in Several Subjects)
- Rev. Dr. Dr. Garry Williams (Director of the Pastor's Academy and Lecturer in Several Subjects)
- Dr. Matthew Mason (Tutor in Christian Ethics, Assistant Director of Pastors' Academy)
- Paul Mallard (Systematic Theology and Pastoral Studies)
- Stéphane Simonnin (Greek and Church History)
- Dr. Robert Strivens (Church History)
- Mike Gilbart-Smith (New Testament and Church Government)
- Michael Prest (Mission & Evangelism)
- Luke Jenner (New Testament and Old Testament)
- Rev. David Pfeiffer (Old Testament)
- Dr. Kenneth Brownell
- Barry King
- Dr John Ling
- Sharon James
- Dr Dirk Jongkind
- Ray Evans
- Chungman Shon
- Phil Heaps
- Chris Davis
- Paul Yeulett
- Dr. John Benton (former Director of Pastoral Support, Pastors Academy)
- Dr. Neil Martin (former Tutor of Biblical Studies, Pastors' Academy)
- Dr. Martin Salter
- Phil Arthur
