= Enzesfeld Castle =

Historic castle in the Triesting valley, Austria

Coordinates: 47.921°N 16.176°E

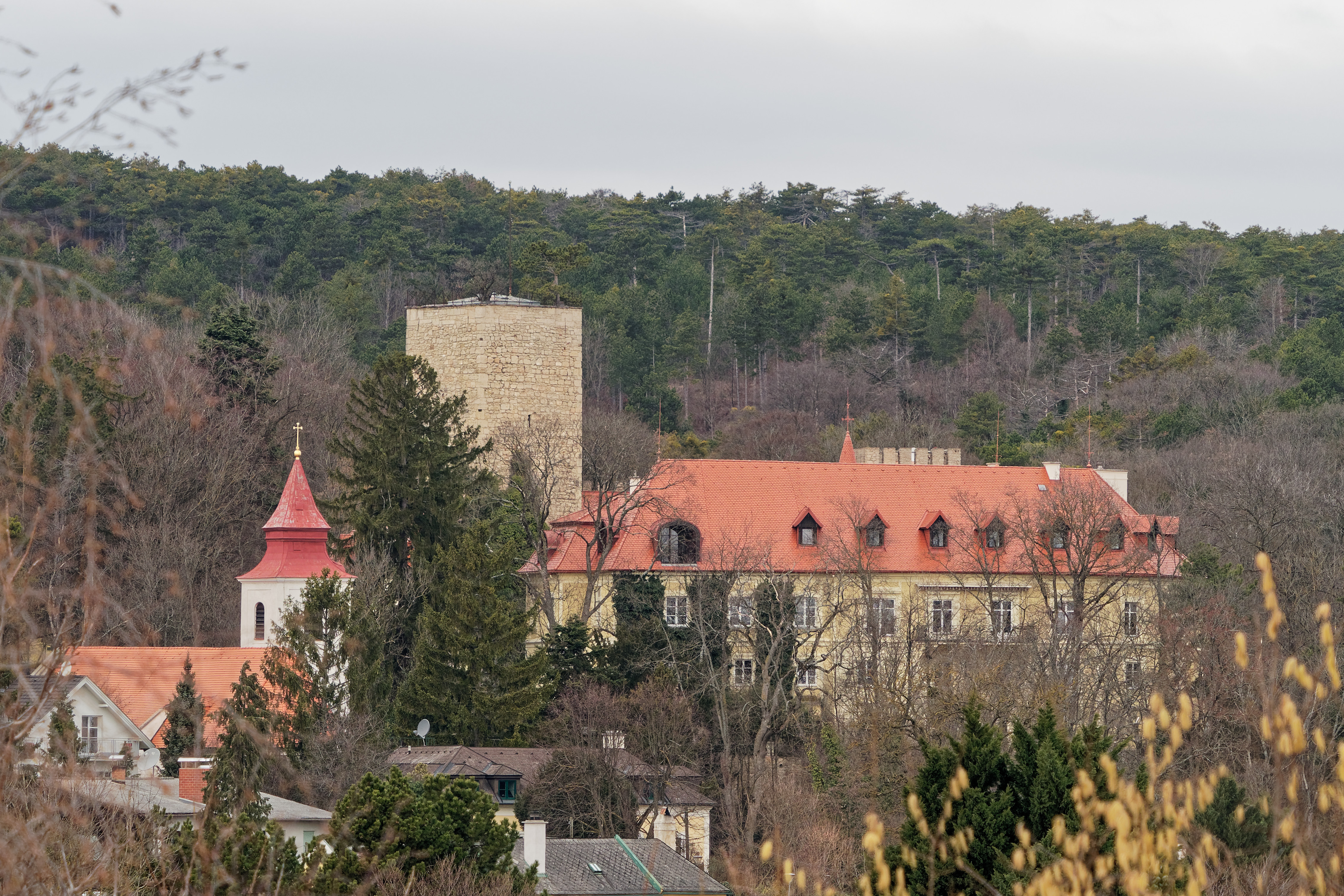
Enzesfeld Castle, 2020

Enzesfeld Castle (German: Schloss Enzesfeld) is a historic castle in the Triesting valley located at Schloßstraße 38, 40, 42 in Enzesfeld-Lindabrunn, Baden District, Lower Austria. It is about twenty-five miles from Vienna.

== History ==
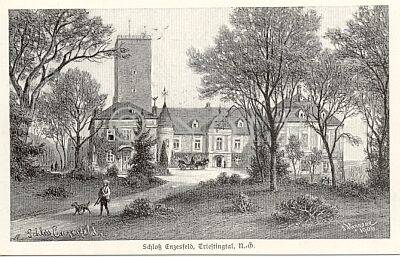
Palace Enzesfeld in Enzesfeld-Lindabrunn, Lower Austria, by Johann Varrone, 1906

The castle was developed as a fortress in the late 11th century. It came under the control of the Habsburgs, who sold the castle in the 16th century. It was owned by a variety of families over the next few centuries.

=== Rothschild family ===
In 1880 the estate was purchased by Baron Albert Salomon Anselm von Rothschild, who restored the castle and greatly improved the property. He was known as a great benefactor to the town. Upon his death in 1911, the estate passed to his son, Eugène von Rothschild, and between the wars the Viennese Rothschild family entertained grandly there, including the Duke and Duchess of Windsor. Rothschild had a private 9-hole golf course created on the estate.

Eugène's first wife, American divorcee Catherine "Kitty" Wolf, a friend of Elsie de Wolfe (wife of British diplomat Sir Charles Mendl). In 1937, on Lady Mendl's recommendation, the Rothschilds invited the Duke of Windsor to stay when he left England, having signed the His Majesty's Declaration of Abdication on 10 December 1936. The Duke stayed at the castle for three months until Wallis Simpson's divorce was finalized and the two could wed, which they did at the Château de Candé in France on 3 June 1937.

During the Anschluss in World War II, all the Austrian properties of the Rothschild family were confiscated by the Nazis. Their businesses in Vienna were seized, and Eugène and his family had to pay an enormous ransom for the release of his brother Louis von Rothschild who was imprisoned by the Gestapo. Eugène and his wife left for the United States, where they settled on Long Island.

=== Post–World War II ===
After the War ended, the properties were returned to the Rothschild family and Eugène sold the Enzesfeldt estate in 1963. It was subsequently developed into a country club by Baron Hubert von Pantz, who also ran the at Schloss Mittersill International Sport and Shooting Club at Mittersill Castle. Baron von Pantz expanded the golf course to an 18-hole course by John Harris.
