= Franco-American =

Franco-American may refer to:

- French Americans, American people of French or French Canadian descent
- Franco-American (brand), a brand name of the Campbell Soup Company
- Franco-American alliance, 1778 alliance between the Kingdom of France and the United States during the American Revolutionary War
- Quasi-War, Franco-American War, or Franco-American crisis, an undeclared war fought from 1798 to 1800 between the United States and France

== See also ==
- France–United States relations
- History of the Franco-Americans
