= Wallis Simpson =

Wife of Prince Edward, Duke of Windsor (1896–1986)

- Duchess of Windsor
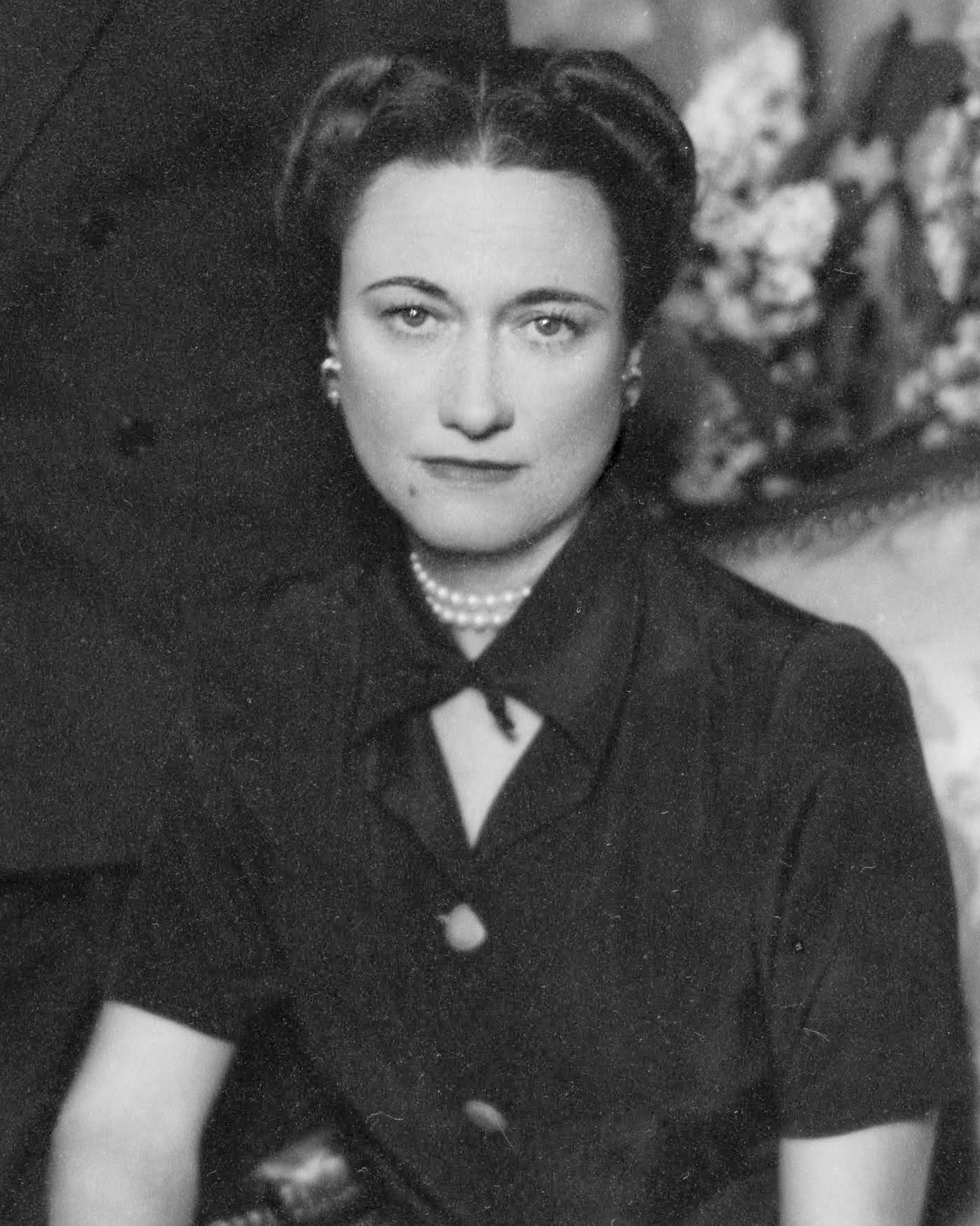
- Simpson, c. 1934
- Born: Bessie Wallis Warfield; June 19, 1896 (Note: According to 1900 census returns, she was born in June 1895, which author Charles Higham asserted was before her parents' marriage (Higham, p. 4). Author Greg King, wrote that, though Higham's "scandalous assertion of illegitimacy enlivens the telling of the Duchess's life", "the evidence to support it is slim indeed", and that it "strains credulity" (King, p. 11).); Blue Ridge Summit, Pennsylvania, U.S.
- Died: April 24, 1986 (aged 89); 4 route du Champ d'Entraînement, Paris, France
- Buried: April 29, 1986; Royal Burial Ground, Frogmore, Berkshire, England
- Family: Windsor (by marriage)
- Spouses: Earl Winfield Spencer Jr. (m. 1916; div. 1927) Ernest Simpson (m. 1928; div. 1937) Prince Edward, Duke of Windsor (former Edward VIII) (m. 1937; died 1972)
- Father: Teackle Wallis Warfield
- Mother: Alice Montague
- Occupation: Socialite

Wallis, Duchess of Windsor (born Bessie Wallis Warfield; June 19, 1896 – April 24, 1986), was an American socialite and the wife of Prince Edward, Duke of Windsor (former King Edward VIII). Their intention to marry and her status as a divorcée caused a constitutional crisis that led to Edward's abdication.

Wallis grew up in Baltimore, Maryland. Her father died shortly after her birth, and she and her widowed mother were partly supported by their wealthier relatives. Her first marriage, to United States Navy officer Win Spencer, was punctuated by periods of separation and eventually ended in divorce. In 1931, while married to her second husband Ernest Simpson, she met Edward, the heir apparent to the British throne. Five years later, after Edward's accession as King of the United Kingdom, Wallis divorced Ernest to marry Edward.

The King's desire to marry a woman who had two living ex-husbands threatened to cause a constitutional crisis in the United Kingdom and the Dominions, ultimately leading to his abdication in December 1936. After abdicating, Edward was made Duke of Windsor by his brother and successor, George VI. Wallis married Edward six months later, after which she was formally known as the Duchess of Windsor, but was not allowed to share her husband's style of "Royal Highness".

Before, during, and after the Second World War, Wallis and Edward were suspected by many in government and society of being Nazi sympathizers. In 1937, without government approval, they visited Germany and met Adolf Hitler. In 1940, Edward was appointed governor of the Bahamas, and the couple moved to the islands until he relinquished the office in 1945. In the 1950s and 1960s, they shuttled between Europe and the United States, living a life of leisure as society celebrities. After Edward's death in 1972, Wallis lived in seclusion and was rarely seen in public. Her private life has been a source of much speculation, and she remains a controversial figure in British history.

== Early life and education ==
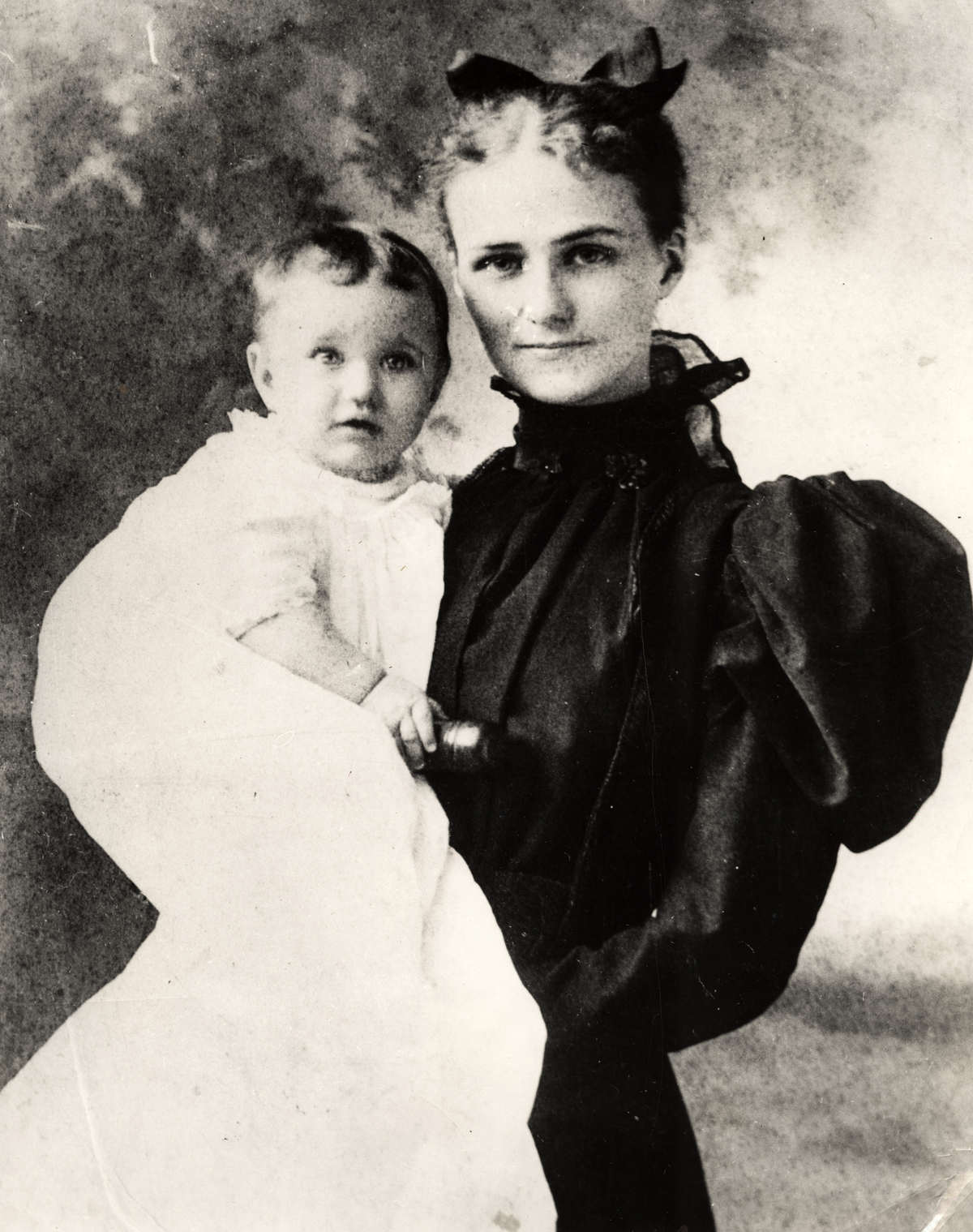
A six-month-old Wallis with her mother, Alice Warfield

An only child, Bessie Wallis (sometimes written "Bessiewallis") Warfield was born on June 19, 1896, in Square Cottage at Monterey Inn, a hotel directly across the road from the Monterey Country Club in Blue Ridge Summit, Pennsylvania. A summer resort close to the border with Maryland, Blue Ridge Summit was popular with Baltimoreans escaping the season's heat, and Monterey Inn, which had a central building and individual wooden cottages, was the town's largest hotel.

Wallis's father was Teackle Wallis Warfield (named after Severn Teackle Wallis), the fifth and youngest son of Henry Mactier Warfield, a prominent merchant who was described as "one of the best known and personally one of the most popular citizens of Baltimore" and who ran for mayor in 1875. Her mother was Alice Montague, a daughter of stockbroker William Latane Montague. Wallis was named in honor of her father (who was known as Wallis) and her mother's elder sister, Bessie (Mrs. D. Buchanan Merryman), and was called Bessie Wallis until, at some time in her youth, the name Bessie was dropped.

According to a wedding announcement published in The Baltimore Sun on November 20, 1895, Wallis's parents were married by C. Ernest Smith at Baltimore's Saint Michael and All Angels' Protestant Episcopal Church on November 19, 1895, which suggests she was conceived out of wedlock. Wallis said that her parents were married in June 1895. Her father died of tuberculosis on November 15, 1896. For her first few years, Wallis and her mother were dependent on the charity of her father's wealthy bachelor brother Solomon Davies Warfield, postmaster of Baltimore and later president of the Continental Trust Company and the Seaboard Air Line Railway. Initially, they lived with him at the four-story row house at 34 East Preston Street that he shared with his mother.

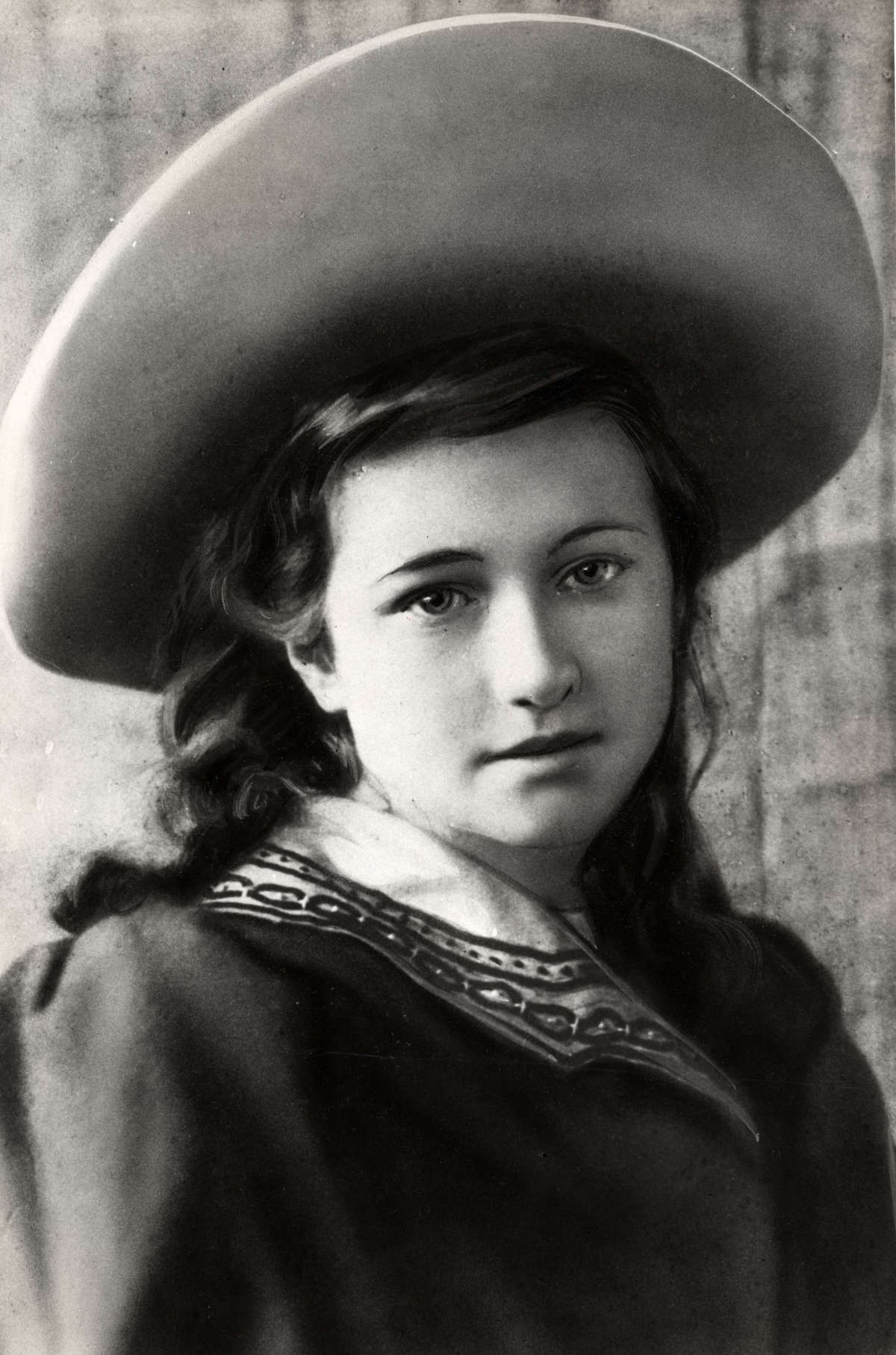
Wallis as a ten-year-old schoolgirl

In 1901, Wallis's aunt Bessie Merryman was widowed, and the following year Alice and Wallis moved into her four-bedroom house on West Chase Street, Baltimore, where they lived for at least a year until they settled in an apartment, and then a house, of their own. In 1908, Wallis's mother married her second husband, John Freeman Rasin, son of prominent Democratic Party boss Isaac Freeman Rasin.

On April 17, 1910, Wallis was confirmed at Christ Episcopal Church, Baltimore, and between 1912 and 1914 her uncle paid for her to attend Oldfields School, the most expensive girls' school in Maryland. There she became a friend of heiress Renée du Pont, a daughter of Senator T. Coleman du Pont of the du Pont family, and Mary Kirk, whose family founded Kirk Silverware. A fellow pupil at one of Wallis's schools recalled, "She was bright, brighter than all of us. She made up her mind to go to the head of the class, and she did." Wallis was always immaculately dressed and pushed herself hard to do well. A later biographer wrote of her, "Though Wallis's jaw was too heavy for her to be counted beautiful, her fine violet-blue eyes and petite figure, quick wits, vitality, and capacity for total concentration on her interlocutor ensured that she had many admirers."

== First marriage ==
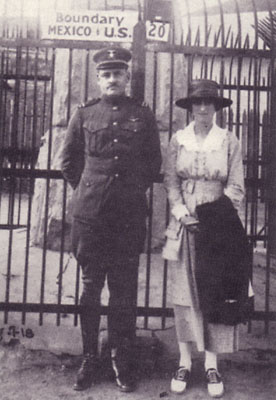
Wallis and her first husband, Earl W. Spencer, 1918

In April 1916, Wallis met Earl Winfield Spencer Jr., a US Navy aviator, in Pensacola, Florida, while visiting her cousin Corinne Mustin, spouse of Henry C. Mustin. It was at this time that Wallis witnessed two airplane crashes about two weeks apart, resulting in a lifelong fear of flying. The couple married on November 8, 1916, at Christ Episcopal Church in Baltimore, which had been Wallis's parish. Win, as her husband was known, was a heavy drinker. He drank even before flying and once crashed into the sea, but escaped almost unharmed. After the United States entered the First World War in 1917, Spencer was posted to San Diego as the first commanding officer of a training base in Coronado, known as Naval Air Station North Island; they remained there until 1921.

In 1920, Edward, Prince of Wales, visited San Diego, but he and Wallis did not meet. Later that year, Spencer left his wife for a period of four months, but in the spring of 1921 they were reunited in Washington, D.C., where Spencer had been posted. They soon separated again, and in 1922, when Spencer was posted to the Far East as commander of the USS Pampanga, Wallis remained behind, continuing an affair with an Argentine diplomat, Felipe de Espil. In January 1924, she visited Paris with her recently widowed cousin Corinne Mustin, before sailing to the Far East aboard a troop carrier, USS Chaumont. The Spencers were briefly reunited until she fell ill, after which she returned to Hong Kong.

Wallis toured China, and while in Beijing stayed with Katherine and Herman Rogers, who were to remain her longterm friends. According to the wife of one of Win's fellow officers, Mrs. Milton E. Miles, in Beijing Wallis met Count Galeazzo Ciano, later Mussolini's son-in-law and foreign minister, had an affair with him, and became pregnant, leading to a botched abortion that left her infertile. The rumor was later widespread but never substantiated and Ciano's wife, Edda Mussolini, denied it. The existence of an official "China dossier" (detailing the supposed sexual and criminal exploits of Wallis in China) is denied by historians and biographers. Wallis spent over a year in China, during which time—according to the socialite Madame Wellington Koo—she managed to master only one Chinese phrase: "Boy, pass me the champagne". By September 1925, she and her husband were back in the United States, though living apart. Their divorce was finalized on December 10, 1927.

== Second marriage ==
By the time her marriage to Spencer was dissolved, Wallis had become involved with Ernest Aldrich Simpson, an Anglo-American shipping executive and former officer in the Coldstream Guards. He divorced his first wife, Dorothea (by whom he had a daughter, Audrey), to marry Wallis on July 21, 1928, at the Register Office in Chelsea, London. Wallis had telegraphed her acceptance of his proposal from Cannes, where she was staying with her friends, Mr. and Mrs. Rogers.

The Simpsons temporarily set up home in a furnished house with four servants in Mayfair. In 1929, Wallis sailed back to the United States to visit her sick mother, who had married legal clerk Charles Gordon Allen after the death of Rasin. During the trip, Wallis's investments were wiped out in the Wall Street Crash, and her mother died penniless on November 2, 1929. Wallis returned to England and with the shipping business still buoyant, the Simpsons moved into a large flat with a staff of servants.

Through a friend, Consuelo Thaw, Wallis met Consuelo's sister Thelma, Viscountess Furness, at the time the mistress of Edward, Prince of Wales. On January 10, 1931, Lady Furness introduced Wallis to Edward at Burrough Court, near Melton Mowbray. Edward was the eldest son of King George V and Queen Mary, and heir apparent to the British throne. Between 1931 and 1934, he met the Simpsons at various house parties, and Wallis was presented at court. Ernest was beginning to encounter financial difficulties, as the Simpsons were living beyond their means, and they had to fire a succession of staff.

== Relationship with Edward, Prince of Wales ==
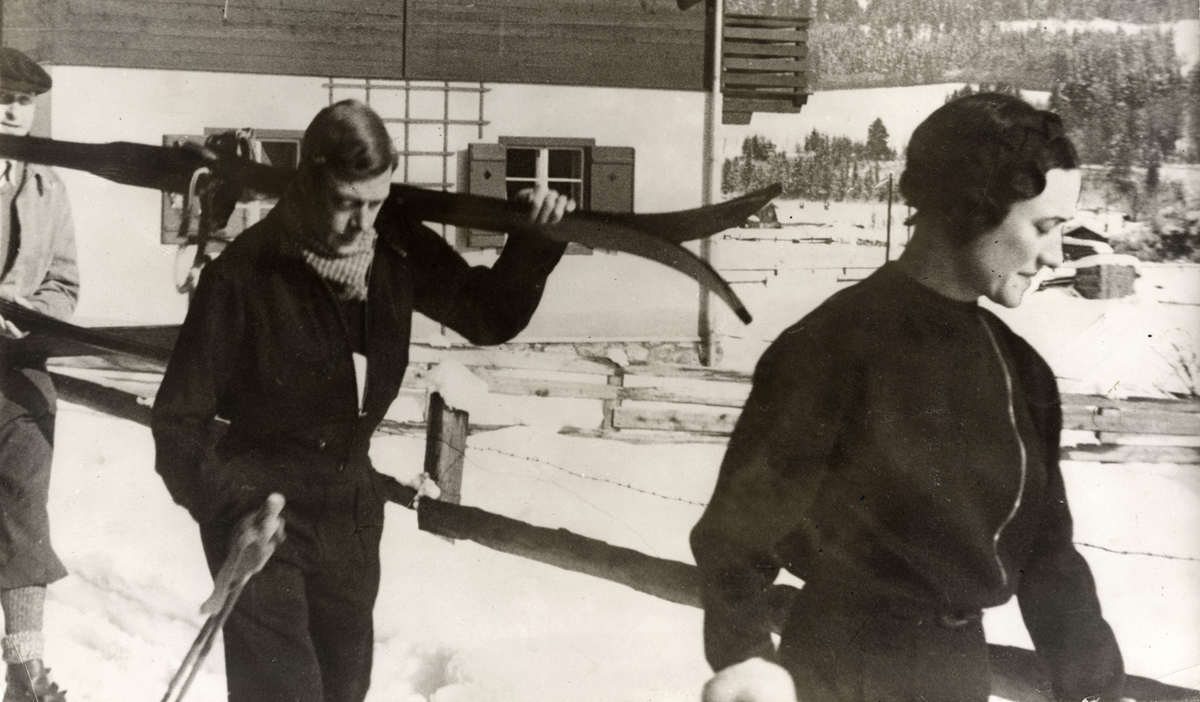
The Prince of Wales and Wallis in Kitzbühel, Austria, February 1935

In January 1934, while Lady Furness was away in New York City, Wallis allegedly became Edward's mistress. Edward denied this to his father, despite his staff seeing them in bed together as well as "evidence of a physical sexual act". Wallis soon ousted Furness, and Edward distanced himself from a former lover and confidante, the Anglo-American textile heiress Freda Dudley Ward.

By the end of 1934, Edward was irretrievably besotted with Wallis, finding her domineering manner and abrasive irreverence toward his position appealing; in the words of his official biographer, he became "slavishly dependent" on her. According to Wallis, it was during a cruise on Lord Moyne's private yacht Rosaura in August 1934 that she fell in love with Edward. At an evening party in Buckingham Palace, he introduced her to his mother; his father was outraged, primarily on account of her marital history, as divorced people were generally excluded from court. Edward showered Wallis with money and jewels, and in February 1935, and again later in the year, he holidayed with her in Europe. His courtiers became increasingly alarmed as the affair began to interfere with his official duties.

In 1935, the head of the Metropolitan Police Special Branch told the Metropolitan Police Commissioner that Wallis was also having an affair with Guy Marcus Trundle, who was "said to be employed by the Ford Motor Company". Rumors of an affair were doubted, however, by Captain Val Bailey, who knew Trundle well and whose mother had an affair with Trundle for nearly two decades, and by historian Susan Williams.

== Abdication crisis ==
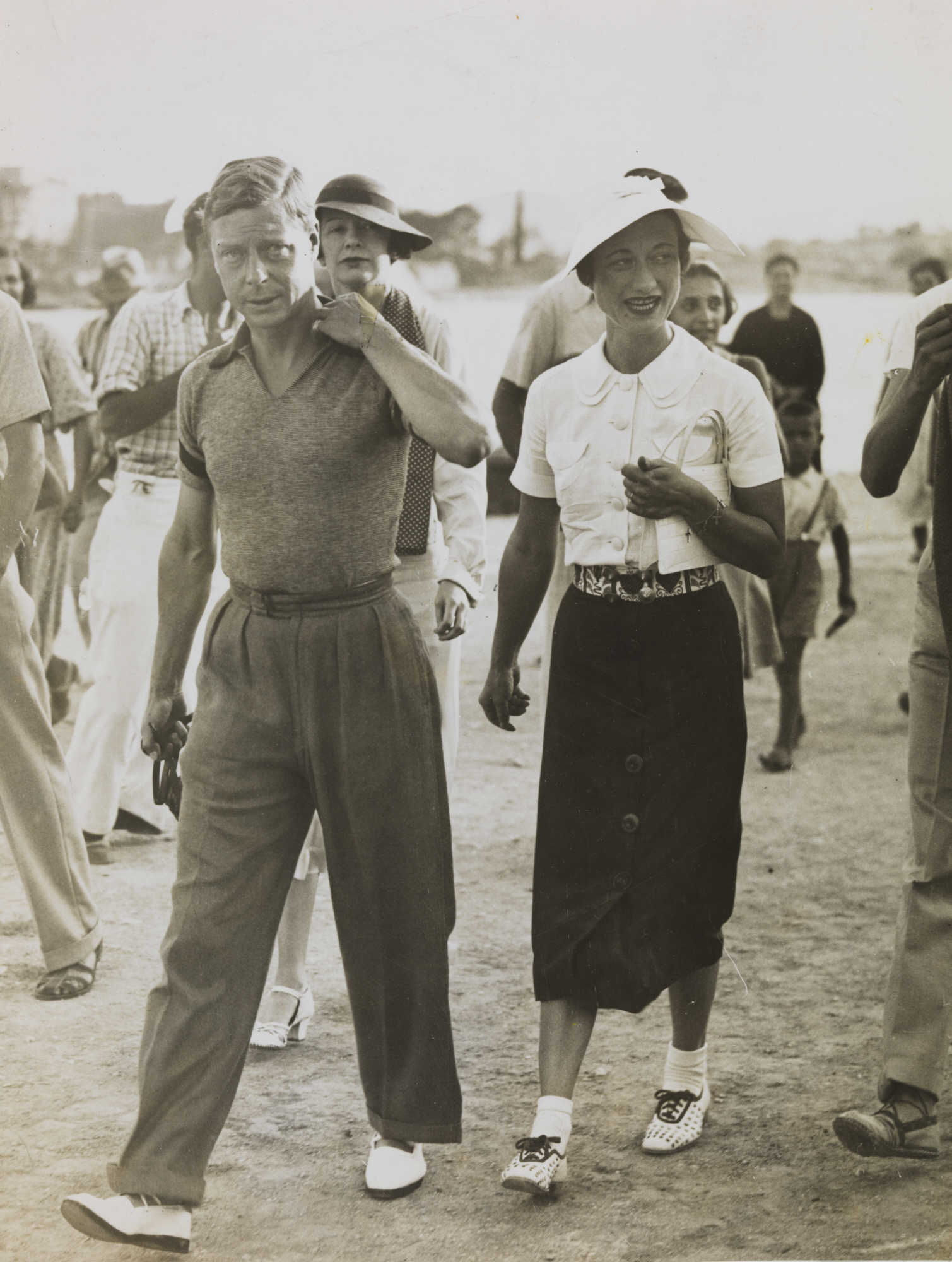
Edward VIII and Wallis Simpson on holiday in Yugoslavia, 1936

On January 20, 1936, George V died at Sandringham and Edward ascended the throne as Edward VIII. The next day, he broke royal protocol by watching the proclamation of his accession from a window of St James's Palace, in the company of the still-married Wallis. It was becoming apparent to court and government circles that the new king meant to marry her. Edward's behaviour and his relationship with Wallis made him unpopular with the Conservative-led British government, as well as distressing his mother and his brother the Duke of York. The British media remained deferential to the monarchy, and no stories of the affair were reported in the domestic press, but foreign media widely reported their relationship. After the death of George V, before her divorce from her second husband, Wallis reportedly said, "Soon I shall be Queen of England."

The monarch of the United Kingdom is Supreme Governor of the Church of England. At the time of the proposed marriage (and until 2002), the Church of England disapproved of, and would not perform, the remarriage of divorced people if their former spouse was still alive. Constitutionally, the King was required to be in communion with the Church of England, but his proposed marriage conflicted with the Church's teachings. Additionally, at the time both the Church and English law only recognized adultery as a legitimate ground for divorce. Since she had divorced her first husband on grounds of "mutual incompatibility", there was a possibility that her second marriage, as well as her prospective marriage to Edward, would be considered bigamous if her first divorce had been challenged in court.

The British and Dominion governments believed that a twice-divorced woman was politically, socially, and morally unsuitable as a prospective consort. Wallis was perceived by many in the British Empire as a woman of "limitless ambition" who was pursuing the King because of his wealth and position.

Wallis had already filed for divorce from her second husband on the grounds that he had committed adultery with her childhood friend Mary Kirk and the decree nisi was granted on October 27, 1936. In November, the King consulted with the British prime minister, Stanley Baldwin, on a way to marry Wallis and keep the throne. Edward suggested a morganatic marriage, where he would remain king but Wallis would not be queen, but this was rejected by Baldwin and the prime ministers of Australia, Canada, and the Union of South Africa. If Edward were to marry Wallis against Baldwin's advice, the government would be required to resign, causing a constitutional crisis.

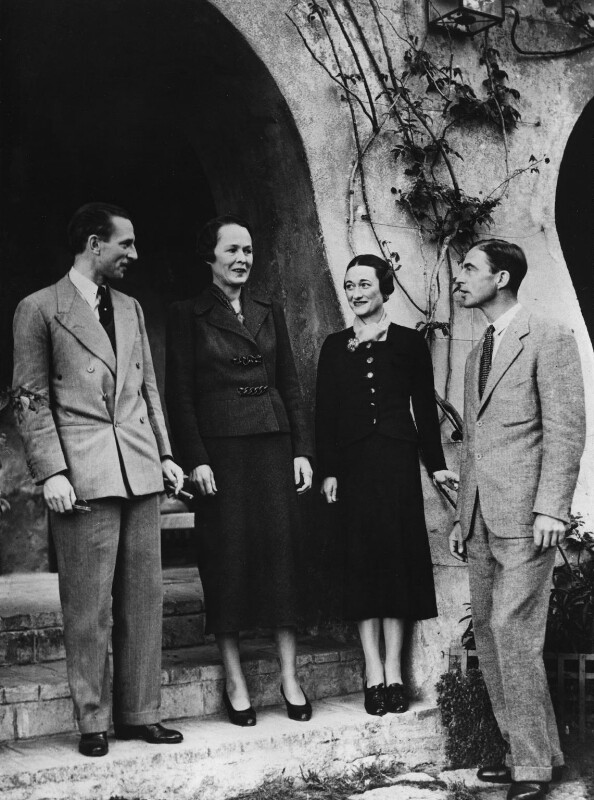
Herman and Katherine Rogers (left) with Wallis and Lord Brownlow in France, 1936

Wallis's relationship with Edward had become public knowledge in the United Kingdom by early December. She decided to flee the country as the scandal broke, and was driven to the south of France in a dramatic race to outrun the press. For the next three months, she was under siege by the media at the Villa Lou Viei, near Cannes, the home of her close friends Herman and Katherine Rogers, whom she later thanked effusively in her ghost-written memoirs. According to Andrew Morton, who relied on an interview with the stepdaughter-in-law of Herman Rogers conducted 80 years later, Simpson confessed during the writing of her memoirs that Rogers was the love of her life. However, at her instruction, the ghostwriter omitted this revelation from the final memoirs. At her hideaway, Wallis was pressured by Lord Brownlow, the King's lord-in-waiting, to renounce Edward. On December 7, 1936, Brownlow read to the press Wallis's statement, which he had helped her draft, indicating her readiness to give up Edward. However, Edward was determined to marry Wallis. John Theodore Goddard, Wallis's solicitor, stated: "[his] client was ready to do anything to ease the situation but the other end of the wicket [Edward VIII] was determined." This seemingly indicated that Edward had decided he had no option but to abdicate if he wished to marry Wallis.

Edward signed the Instrument of Abdication on December 10, 1936, in the presence of his three surviving brothers, the Dukes of York, Gloucester and Kent. Special laws passed by the Parliaments of the Dominions finalized Edward's abdication the following day, or in Ireland's case one day later. The Duke of York then became King George VI. On December 11, Edward said in a radio broadcast, "I have found it impossible to carry the heavy burden of responsibility, and to discharge my duties as King as I would wish to do, without the help and support of the woman I love."

Edward left Britain for Austria, where he stayed at Schloss Enzesfeld, the home of Baron Eugène and Baroness Kitty de Rothschild. Edward had to remain apart from Wallis until there was no danger of compromising the granting of a decree absolute in her divorce proceedings. Upon her divorce being made final in May 1937, she changed her name by deed poll to Wallis Warfield, resuming her maiden name. The couple were reunited at the Château de Candé, Monts, France, on May 4, 1937.

== Third marriage: Duchess of Windsor ==
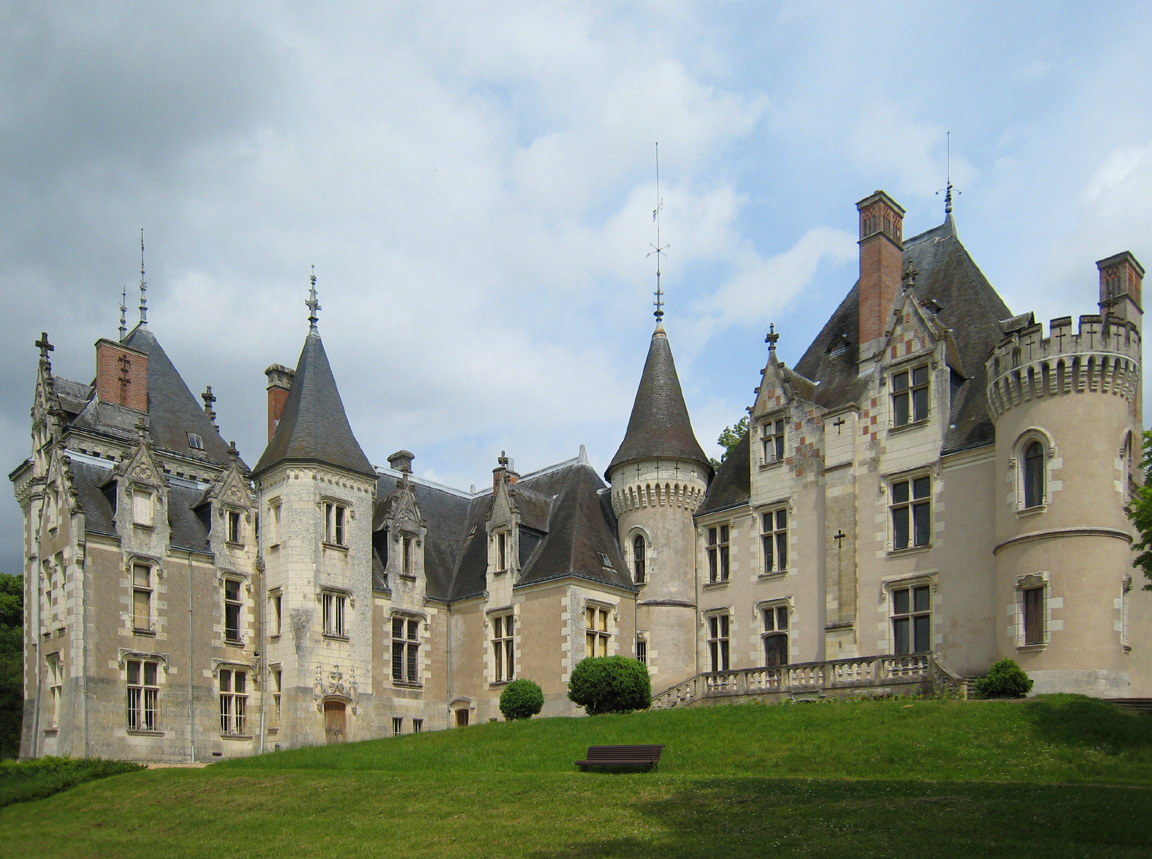
Château de Candé, Monts, France

Wallis and Edward married one month later on June 3, 1937, at the Château de Candé, lent to them by French millionaire Charles Bedaux. The date would have been King George V's 72nd birthday; Queen Mary thought the wedding had been scheduled for then as a deliberate slight. No member of Edward's family attended. Wallis wore a "Wallis blue" wedding dress. Edward presented her with an engagement ring that consisted of an emerald mount in yellow gold set with diamonds, and the sentence "We are ours now" was engraved on it. While the Church of England refused to sanction the wedding, Robert Anderson Jardine, Vicar of St Paul's, Darlington, offered to perform the service, an offer that was accepted by the couple. Guests included Randolph Churchill, Baron Eugène Daniel von Rothschild, and the best man, Major Edward Dudley "Fruity" Metcalfe. The marriage produced no children. In November, Ernest Simpson married Mary Kirk.

Edward was created Duke of Windsor by his brother King George VI prior to the marriage. However, letters patent, issued by the new king and unanimously supported by the Dominion governments, prevented Wallis, now Duchess of Windsor, from sharing her husband's style of "Royal Highness". George VI's firm view that Wallis should not be given a royal title was shared by his mother, Queen Mary, and his wife, Queen Elizabeth (later the Queen Mother). At first, the British royal family did not accept Wallis and would not receive her formally, although the former king sometimes met his mother and siblings after his abdication. Some biographers have suggested that Wallis's sister-in-law Queen Elizabeth remained bitter towards her for her role in bringing George VI to the throne (which she may have seen as a factor in his early death) and for prematurely behaving as Edward's consort when she was his mistress. These claims were denied by Elizabeth's close friends, such as the Duke of Grafton, who wrote that she "never said anything nasty about the Duchess of Windsor, except to say she really hadn't got a clue what she was dealing with." Elizabeth was said to have referred to Wallis as "that woman", while Wallis and Edward referred to Queen Elizabeth as "Mrs. Temple" and "Cookie", alluding to her solid figure and fondness for food, and to her daughter Princess Elizabeth (later Queen Elizabeth II) as "Shirley", as in Shirley Temple. Wallis bitterly resented the denial of the royal title and the refusal of Edward's relatives to accept her as part of the family. Within the household of the Duke and Duchess, the style "Her Royal Highness" was used by those who were close to the couple.

According to Diana Mosley, who knew both Queen Elizabeth and Wallis but was only friendly with the latter, Elizabeth's antipathy toward Wallis may have resulted from jealousy. Lady Mosley wrote to her sister, the Duchess of Devonshire, after the death of the Duke of Windsor, "probably the theory of their [the Windsors'] contemporaries that Cake [a Mitford nickname for the Queen Mother] was rather in love with him [the Duke] (as a girl) & took second best, may account for much."

Wallis and Edward with Adolf Hitler, 1937

Wallis and Edward lived in France in the pre-war years. In 1937, they made a high-profile visit to Germany and met Adolf Hitler at the Berghof, his Berchtesgaden retreat. After the visit, Hitler said of Wallis, "she would have made a good queen". The visit tended to corroborate the strong suspicions of many in government and society that Wallis was a German agent, a claim that she ridiculed in her letters to Edward. US FBI files compiled in the 1930s also portray her as a possible Nazi sympathizer. Duke Carl Alexander of Württemberg told the FBI that Wallis and leading Nazi Joachim von Ribbentrop, who served as Ambassador of Germany to the United Kingdom during the 1930s, had been lovers in London. There were even rather improbable reports during the Second World War that she kept a signed photograph of Ribbentrop on her bedside table.

Edward wrote in the New York Daily News of December 13, 1966: "In a roundabout way [Hitler] encouraged me to infer that Red Russia was the only enemy and that it was in Britain's interest and in Europe's too, that Germany be encouraged to strike east and smash Communism forever ... I confess frankly that he took me in. ... I thought the rest of us could be fence-sitters while the Nazis and the Reds slogged it out."

== Second World War ==
As the German troops advanced into France in 1940, the Windsors fled south from their Paris home, first to Biarritz then to Spain in June. Wallis told United States ambassador to Spain Alexander W. Weddell that France had lost because it was "internally diseased". The couple moved to Portugal in July. They stayed in Cascais, at Casa de Santa Maria, the home of Ricardo do Espírito Santo e Silva, a banker who was suspected of being a German agent.

In August 1940, Wallis and Edward traveled by commercial liner to the Bahamas, where Edward was installed as governor. Wallis was the governor's consort for five years; she was president of the Red Cross, worked for the improvement of infant welfare, and oversaw renovations of Government House. When dozens of Allied ships were sunk off the coast in 1942 during the Battle of the Caribbean, Wallis was instrumental in helping survivors who made it to Nassau, greeting most personally and setting up a canteen, accommodation, and other amenities for them, writing in her memoirs, "we received some truly heart-wrenching cases, men who had drifted for days without food or water under the searing tropical sun."

However, she hated Nassau, calling it "our St Helena" in a reference to Napoleon's final place of exile, and sarcastically commenting on the government surveillance. She was heavily criticized in the British press for her extravagant shopping in the United States, undertaken when Britain was enduring privations such as rationing and blackout. She referred to the local population as "lazy, thriving niggers" in letters to her aunt, which reflected her upbringing in Jim Crow Baltimore. (Note: When telling a story of how Wallis complained about blacks being allowed on Park Avenue (Manhattan), Joanne Cummings, the wife of Nathan Cummings, said of Wallis, "She grew up in the South, at a certain time, with certain prejudices." Source: Menkes, p. 88) Prime Minister Winston Churchill strenuously objected in 1941 when she and her husband planned to tour the Caribbean aboard a yacht belonging to Swedish magnate Axel Wenner-Gren, who Churchill said was "pro-German", and Churchill complained again when the Duke gave a "defeatist" interview. Another of their acquaintances, Charles Bedaux, who had hosted their wedding, was arrested on charges of treason in 1943 but committed suicide in jail in Miami before the case was brought to trial. The British establishment distrusted Wallis; Sir Alexander Hardinge wrote that her suspected anti-British activities were motivated by a desire for revenge against a country that rejected her as its queen. The couple returned to France and retirement after the defeat of Nazi Germany.

== Later life ==
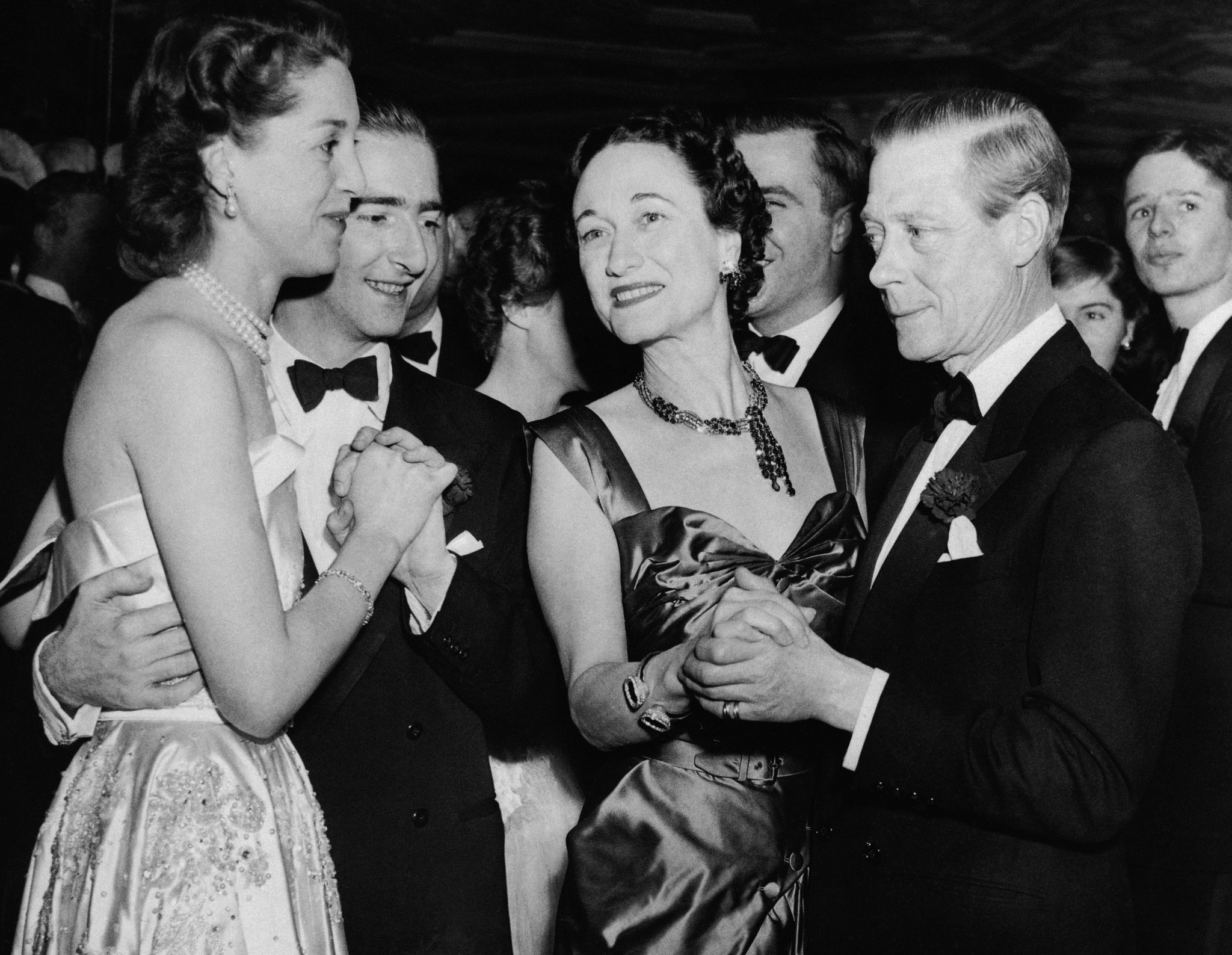
Wallis and Edward at The Sherry-Netherland in New York City, at a party with Peter II of Yugoslavia and his wife, New Year's Day, 1951

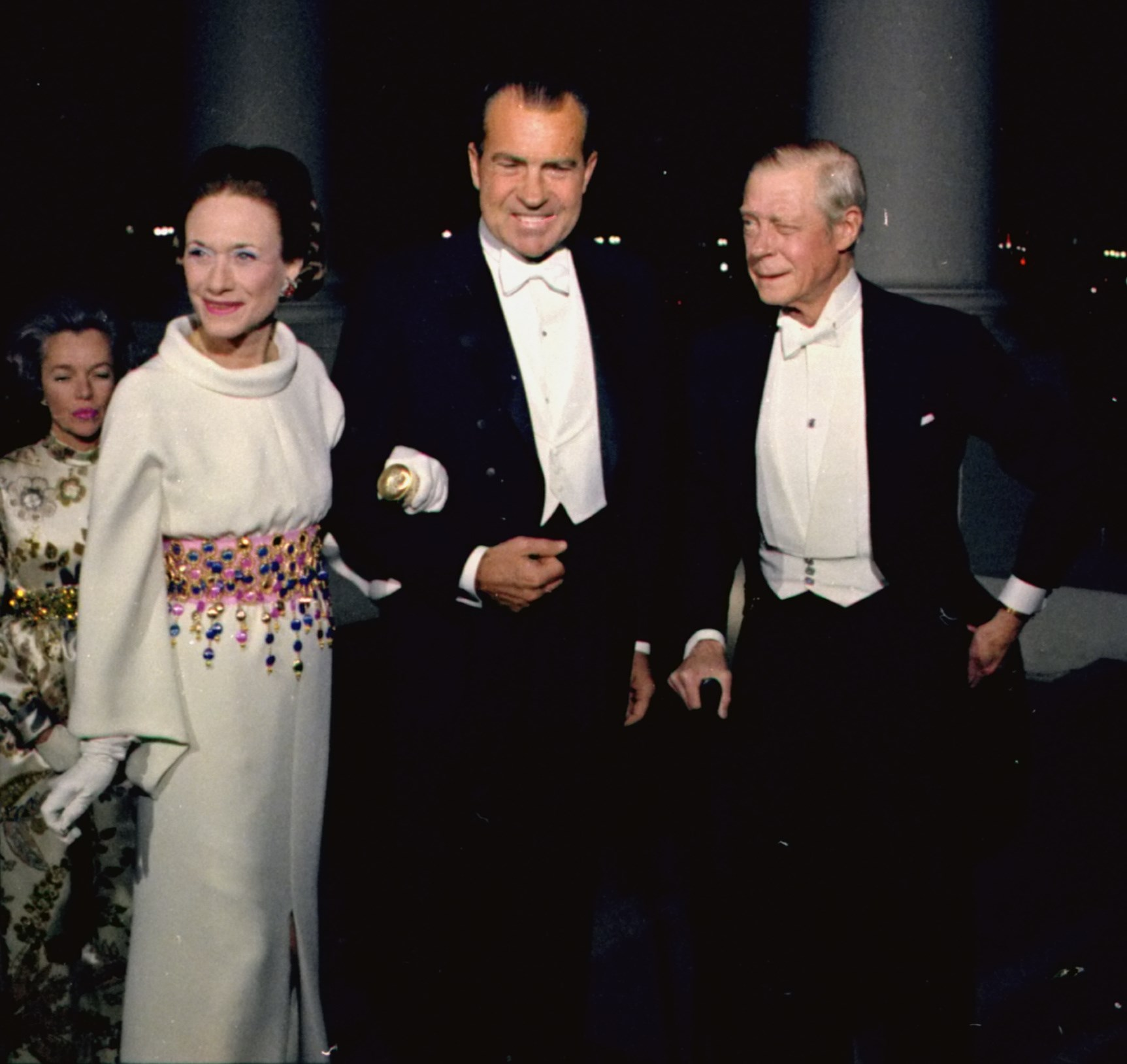
Wallis and Edward at the White House for dinner with President Richard Nixon, 1970

In 1946, when Wallis was staying at Ednam Lodge, the home of the Earl of Dudley, some of her jewels were stolen. The stolen pieces were only a small portion of the Windsor jewels, which were either bought privately, inherited by the Duke, or given to him when he was Prince of Wales. There were rumors that the theft had been masterminded by the royal family as an attempt to regain jewels taken from the Royal Collection by Edward, or by the Windsors themselves as part of an insurance fraud (they made a large deposit of loose stones at Cartier the following year). However, in 1960, career criminal Richard Dunphie confessed to the crime.

In 1952, the Windsors were offered the use of a house by the Paris municipal authorities. The couple lived at 4 route du Champ d'Entraînement in the Bois de Boulogne, near Neuilly-sur-Seine, for most of the remainder of their lives, essentially living a life of easy retirement. They traveled frequently between Europe and America aboard ocean liners. They bought a second house in a far suburb of Paris, Moulin de la Tuilerie or "The Mill" in Gif-sur-Yvette, where they soon became close friends with their neighbors, Oswald and Diana Mosley. Years later, Diana Mosley said that Wallis and Edward shared her and her husband's views that Hitler should have been given a free hand to destroy Communism.

In 1965, Wallis and Edward visited London because Edward required eye surgery for a detached retina; Edward's niece Queen Elizabeth II and sister-in-law Princess Marina, Duchess of Kent, visited them. Edward's sister, the Princess Royal, also visited them just 10 days before her death. Wallis and Edward attended her memorial service in Westminster Abbey. Later, in 1967, they joined the royal family in London for the unveiling of a plaque by Elizabeth II to commemorate the centenary of Queen Mary's birth. The couple spoke to Kenneth Harris for an extensive BBC television interview in 1970. Both Queen Elizabeth II and her son Charles, Prince of Wales, visited the Windsors in Paris in Edward's later years, the Queen's visit being shortly before Edward's death. For much of their later lives, Wallis and Edward were served by their valet and footman Sydney Johnson.

== Widowhood ==
Upon Edward's death from throat cancer in 1972, Wallis traveled to the United Kingdom to attend his funeral, staying at Buckingham Palace during her visit. In November 1975, she was treated at the American Hospital after hemorrhaging from a stomach ulcer and returned home in the summer of 1976. She became increasingly frail and eventually developed dementia, living the final years of her life as a recluse, supported by both her husband's estate and an allowance from Elizabeth II. She suffered several falls and broke her hip twice.

After Edward's death, Wallis's French lawyer, Maitre Suzanne Blum, assumed power of attorney. Blum sold items belonging to Wallis to her own friends at below-market prices and was accused of exploiting her client in Caroline Blackwood's The Last of the Duchess, written in 1980 but not published until 1995, after Blum's death. Later, royal biographer Hugo Vickers called Blum a "Satanic figure ... wearing the mantle of good intention to disguise her inner malevolence".

In 1980, Wallis lost her ability to speak. Toward the end of her life, she was bedridden and did not receive any visitors, apart from her doctor and nurses.

== Death ==
Wallis died at her home at 4 route du Champ d'Entraînement in the Bois de Boulogne, Paris, on April 24, 1986, at the age of 89 from bronchial pneumonia. Her funeral was held on April 29 at St George's Chapel, Windsor Castle, attended by her two surviving sisters-in-law, Queen Elizabeth the Queen Mother and Princess Alice, Duchess of Gloucester, and other members of the royal family. Queen Elizabeth II and her husband, Prince Philip, attended both the funeral ceremony and the burial, as did their son Charles and daughter-in-law Diana. Diana said afterwards that it was the only time she had seen the Queen weep.

Wallis was buried next to Edward in the Royal Burial Ground near Windsor Castle, as "Wallis, Duchess of Windsor". Prior to an agreement with Elizabeth II in the 1960s, Wallis and Edward had previously planned to be buried in a cemetery plot they had purchased at Green Mount Cemetery in Baltimore, where Wallis's father was interred.

In recognition of the help France gave to the Windsors in providing them with a home, and in lieu of death duties, Wallis's collection of Louis XVI style furniture, some porcelain, and paintings were made over to the French state. The British royal family received no major bequests. Most of her estate went to the Pasteur Institute medical research foundation, on the instructions of Suzanne Blum. The decision took the royal family and Wallis's friends by surprise, as she had shown little interest in charity during her life.

A bequest of an unknown amount to the Royal National Lifeboat Institution (RNLI) helped to fund a new Trent-class all-weather lifeboat. The lifeboat, built in 1996 at a cost of £1,580,000, was named 14-22 Edward Duke of Windsor (ON 1226). The boat was assigned to the Relief fleet in 1997 and supported RNLI operations for 28 years, until being withdrawn from service in 2025.

In a Sotheby's auction in Geneva in April 1987, Wallis's jewelry collection raised $45 million for the institute, approximately seven times its pre-sale estimate. Blum later said that Egyptian entrepreneur Mohamed Al-Fayed tried to purchase the jewels for a "rock bottom price". Al-Fayed bought much of the non-financial estate, including the lease of the Paris mansion. An auction of his collection was announced in July 1997 for later that year in New York. After a delay following his son's death in the car crash that also claimed the life of Diana, Princess of Wales, the sale raised more than £14 million for charity in 1998.

== Legacy ==
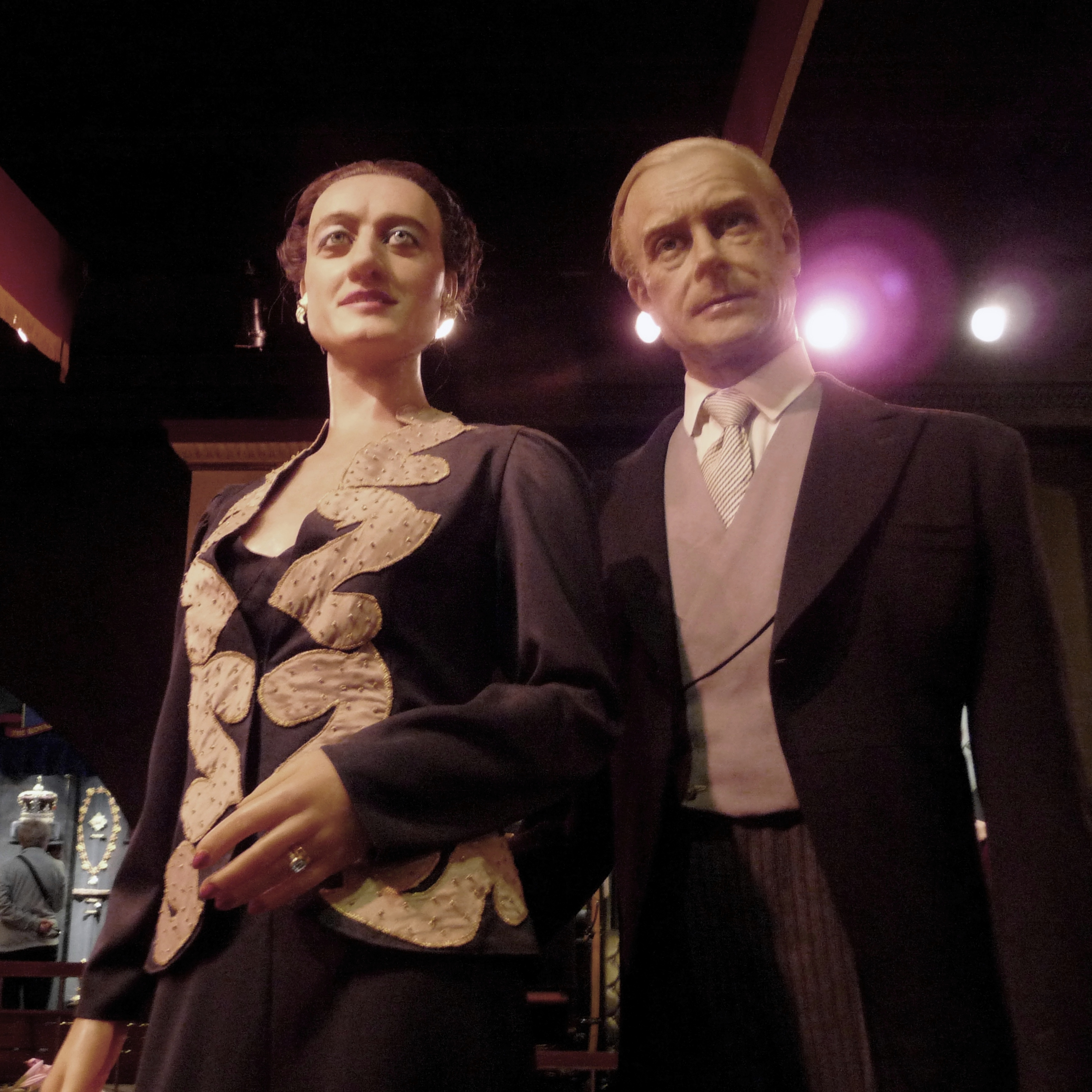
Wax figures of Wallis and Edward at the Royal London Wax Museum, Victoria, British Columbia, Canada

Wallis was plagued by rumors of other lovers. The gay American Jimmy Donahue, an heir to the Woolworth fortune, said he had a liaison with her in the 1950s, but Donahue was notorious for his inventive pranks and rumor-mongering. (Note: Lady Pamela Hicks remembered the Duke being "in tears" with her father Earl Mountbatten of Burma because Wallis was with Donahue.) Wallis's memoir The Heart Has Its Reasons was published in 1956, and biographer Charles Higham said that "facts were remorselessly rearranged in what amounted to a self-performed face-lift". He describes Wallis as "charismatic, electric and compulsively ambitious".

Fictional depictions of the Duchess include the novel Famous Last Words (1981) by Canadian author Timothy Findley, which portrays her as a manipulative conspirator, and Rose Tremain's short story "The Darkness of Wallis Simpson" (2006), which depicts her more sympathetically in her final years of ill health. Hearsay and conjecture have clouded assessment of Wallis's life, not helped by her own manipulation of the truth. But, in the opinion of her biographers, there is no document that proves directly that she was anything other than a victim of her own ambition, who lived out a great romance that became a great tragedy. In the words of one, "she experienced the ultimate fairy tale, becoming the adored favorite of the most glamorous bachelor of his time. The idyll went wrong when, ignoring her pleas, he threw up his position to spend the rest of his life with her." Wallis herself is reported to have summed up her life in a sentence: "You have no idea how hard it is to live out a great romance."

== Titles and styles ==
'WE' cypher of Wallis and Edward

Wallis resumed her maiden name Wallis Warfield by deed poll on May 7, 1937, but continued to use the title "Mrs".

The Duchess of Windsor was styled Her Grace officially, and unofficially styled Her Royal Highness within her own household.

== Works ==
- The Duchess of Windsor (1949). "The Duchess of Windsor's Tongue-In-Cheek Guide to Entertaining". Vogue (UK ed.).
- The Duchess of Windsor (1956). The Heart Has Its Reasons: The Memoirs of the Duchess of Windsor.

== Sources ==
- Bloch, Michael (1996). The Duchess of Windsor. London: Weidenfeld & Nicolson. ISBN 978-0-297-83590-5.
- Bloch, Michael (1982). The Duke of Windsor's War. London: Weidenfeld & Nicolson. ISBN 978-0-297-77947-6.
- Bloch, Michael (1988). The Secret File of the Duke of Windsor. London: Bantam Books. ISBN 978-0-593-01667-1.
- Bloch, Michael, ed. (1986). Wallis and Edward: Letters 1931–1937. Summit Books. ISBN 978-0-671-61209-2.
- Bradford, Sarah (1989). George VI. London: Weidenfeld & Nicolson. ISBN 978-0-297-79667-1.
- Culme, John (1987). The Jewels of the Duchess of Windsor. New York: Vendome Press. ISBN 978-0-86565-089-3.
- Higham, Charles (2005). Mrs Simpson. London: Pan Books. ISBN 978-0-330-42678-7.
- Howarth, Patrick (1987). George VI. London: Hutchinson. ISBN 978-0-09-171000-2.
- King, Greg (1999). The Duchess of Windsor. New York: Citadel Press. ISBN 978-1-55972-471-5.
- Menkes, Suzy (1987). The Windsor Style. London: Grafton Books. ISBN 978-0-246-13212-3.
- Sebba, Anne (2011). That Woman: the Life of Wallis Simpson, Duchess of Windsor. London: Weidenfeld & Nicolson. ISBN 978-0-297-85896-6.
- Vickers, Hugo (2011). Behind Closed Doors: The Tragic, Untold, Story of the Duchess of Windsor. London: Hutchinson. ISBN 978-0-09-193155-1.
- Weir, Alison (1995). Britain's Royal Families: The Complete Genealogy Revised edition. London: Random House. ISBN 978-0-7126-7448-5.
- Williams, Susan (2004). The People's King: The True Story of the Abdication. New York: Palgrave Macmillan. ISBN 978-1-4039-6363-5.
- Wilson, Christopher (2001). Dancing With the Devil: the Windsors and Jimmy Donahue. London: HarperCollins. ISBN 978-0-00-653159-3.
- Windsor, HRH The Duke of (1951). A King's Story. London: Cassell & Co.
- Windsor, The Duchess of (1956). The Heart Has Its Reasons: The Memoirs of the Duchess of Windsor. London: Michael Joseph.
- Ziegler, Philip (1991). King Edward VIII: The Official Biography. New York: Alfred A. Knopf. ISBN 978-0-394-57730-2.
- Ziegler, Philip (2004). "Windsor, (Bessie) Wallis, duchess of Windsor (1896–1986)" (subscription required), Oxford Dictionary of National Biography, Oxford University Press, doi:10.1093/ref:odnb/38277, retrieved May 2, 2010.
