= Burrough Court =

Former country house in Melton Mowbray, England

Coordinates: 52.68323°N 0.89166°W

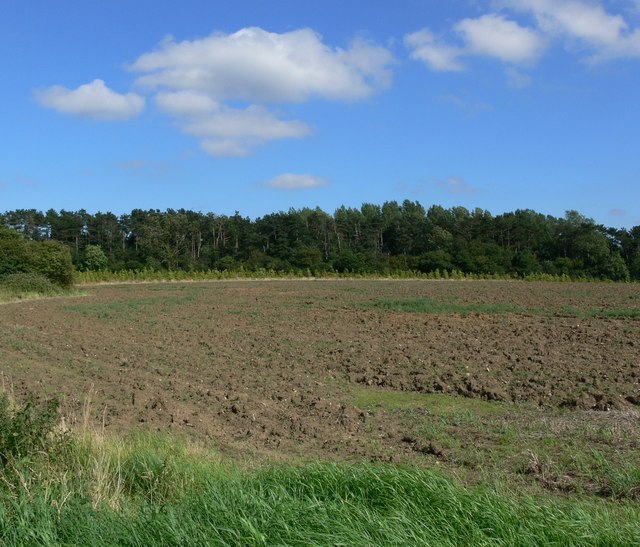
Woodland next to Burrough Court

Burrough Court is a former stately home and now a family-run diversified rural estate located in Burrough on the Hill near Melton Mowbray, Leicestershire, England in the East Midlands. The estate was developed in 1905 with the construction of an Arts and Crafts style country house designed by architect Walter Brierley. During the inter-war period, Burrough Court was associated with the Melton Hunt and received notable visitors, including Edward VIII and Wallis Simpson.

The main house was destroyed by fire in 1944, though the stable yard, chauffeur’s and grooms’ quarters survived. In 2000, planning permission was granted for the restoration and conversion of these remaining buildings, marking the beginning of the estate’s diversification.

Today, Burrough Court operates as a mixed-use business estate. It is home to over 50 businesses and more than 350 people work on the 22-acre business park, through a variety of services; virtual office, co-working space, meeting rooms, offices and warehouse units.

The estate also includes a number of on-site facilities, including a gym, physiotherapy and a recovery room equipped with a sauna, ice bath and compression therapy equipment. An award winning 2-acre secure dog walking field, known as Paws in the Park, operates on the estate, along with a coffee shop. It is also home to the Get Busy Living Centre the headquarters to the Matt Hampson Foundation who inspire and support young people seriously injured through sport. Burrough Court continues to operate as a diversified estate, combining historic buildings with modern commercial use within a rural setting.

== History ==
The house was built in 1905 by H. C. Allfrey and it later belonged to Marmaduke Furness, 1st Viscount Furness, who used it as a hunting box. During this time, Burrough Court became a rendezvous for the hunting society of Melton. In the autumn of 1930, Burrough Court was the backdrop to the first meeting between, Edward VIII, Prince of Wales, and Mrs. Wallis Simpson. The main house burned down at the end of World War II, allegedly due to some Canadian soldiers using explosives to get to a sealed wine cellar. The romance between the Prince of Wales, and Mrs. Wallis Simpson was initiated when both were invited by Thelma, Viscountess Furness to a house-party at Burrough Court. According to Wallis' memoirs, in November 1930, Mr. and Mrs. Simpson were supposedly invited as last minute chaperones to Thelma and the Prince of Wales to hunt at her house in Melton Mowbray.

== Bibliography ==
- Stephen Birmingham, Duchess, The story of Wallis Warfield Windsor,(1969), London: Futura Publications ISBN 978-0-7088-3073-4
- Ursula Bloom, The Duke of Windsor, (1972), London: Robert Hale ISBN 978-0-7091-3642-2
