= Château de Candé =

Château in Centre-Val de Loire, France

Coordinates: 47°17′49″N 0°39′56″E

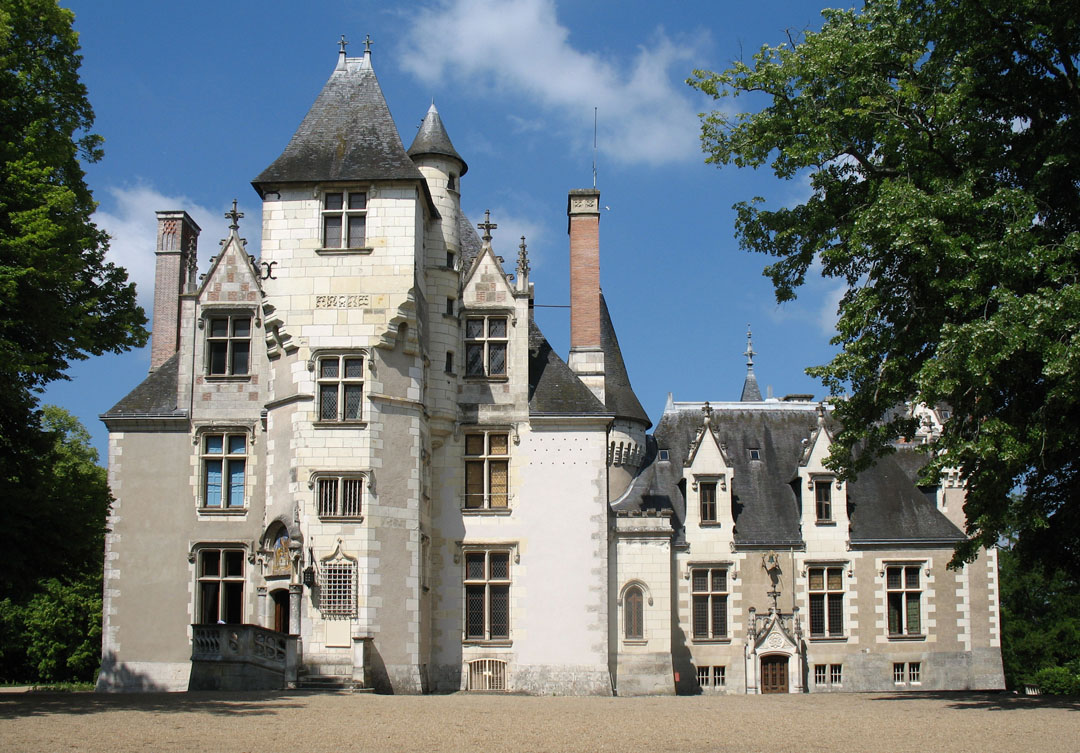
Château de Candé

The Château de Candé is a château located in the commune of Monts, Indre-et-Loire, France. It is situated 10 km (6 mi) to the south of Tours on the north bank of the river Indre.

== History ==
The first known Lord of Candé was Macé de Larçay, in 1313. François Briçonnet, the mayor of Tours and state treasurer, purchased the fief in 1499 and built a Renaissance house on the site of the old fortress. He died before the building was finished, and it was completed by his daughter, Jeanne, in 1508.

Several owners succeeded to the estate, but none brought major transformations to the castle. According to terms of a sale contract dated 28 June 1715 between Georges-François de Guénand, seigneur de l'Étang and Pierre Anguille de la Niverdière, the land consisted of a château-fort, enclosed walls, ditches, drawbridge, barns, gardens, orchards, vines, mature wood of standing timbers and coppice, wild rabbits, and many other things.

On 24 June 1853, Santiago Drake del Castillo (fr), heir of a wealthy plantation owner, acquired the castle. At this time the northern wing was added, in the neo-gothic style; this tripled the living space. M. Drake del Castllo also founded a free school for some sixty young girls, in the valley between the château and the railway right-of-way.

== Charles E. Bedaux and the royal wedding ==
In 1927, Charles Bedaux, a Franco-American industrial millionaire, and his wife Fern, purchased the castle from Jean Drake del Castillo, the grandson of Santiago. They carried out substantial work to modernise the castle, such as adding a plumbing system, improving the electrical system and installing central heating in all parts of the building, with 60 tons of pipes installed in the walls. The eight bedrooms are each equipped with a bathroom in the art déco style; all have baths equipped with an American system, making it possible to fill and empty a bathtub in less than one minute. Indoor toilets were also added. Bedaux installed a telephone, which at the time was unique in a French residence; it was directly connected to the exchange in Tours, and therefore required an operator to be present in the castle.

A golf course with 18 holes, a tennis court, a gymnasium and a solarium were also built at this time.

In 1937, the marriage of the Duke of Windsor (formerly King Edward VIII), and Wallis Simpson, conducted by the Reverend Robert Anderson Jardine, took place here. Cecil Beaton took their wedding photos here as well.

On the death of Fern Bedaux in 1972, the castle was bequeathed to the State, which reassigned it to the council of Indre-et-Loire in 1974.

== See also ==
- Renaissance architecture
- Charles Bedaux - Posthumous reputation
- Robert Anderson Jardine - An unprecedented marriage.
