= Aymeric Faurand-Tournaire =

French footballer (born 2004)

Personal information
- Date of birth: 14 April 2004 (age 22)
- Place of birth: Cordemais, France
- Height: 1.81 m (5 ft 11 in)
- Position: Striker

Team information
- Current team: Hanoi FC
- Number: 9

Youth career
- Temple Cordemais
- –2017: FC Stéphanois
- 2017–2019: USJA Carquefou
- 2019–2022: Brest
- 2022–2023: Laval

Senior career*
| Years | Team | Apps | (Gls) |
| 2023–2026 | Laval B | 58 | (16) |
| 2024–2026 | Laval | 15 | (0) |
| 2026 | → VFC La Roche (loan) | 12 | (3) |
| 2026– | Hanoi FC | 8 | (1) |
- * Club domestic league appearances and goals as of 21 November 2026

Aymeric Faurand-Tournaire (born 14 April 2004) is a French professional footballer who plays as a striker for V.League 1 club Hanoi FC.

== Early life ==
Born in Cordemais, Faurand-Tournaire began his youth career by playing for local clubs. In October 2020, while playing for Brest, he suffered an anterior cruciate ligament injury.

In July 2022, Faurand-Tournaire moved to Laval after his contract with Brest ended.

== Club career ==
On 16 November 2024, Faurand-Tournaire made his debut for Laval in the Coupe de France win over AS Vitré. Two months after, on 4 January 2025, he made his first appearance in Ligue 2, coming in as a substitute in Laval's 2–0 home win against Lorient. On 28 January 2024, he signed his first professional contract with Laval, tying him to the club until June 2028.

On 15 November 2025, Faurand-Tournaire scored his first goals for Laval, netting a brace in team's 6–0 victory against Le Cellier Mauves in the Coupe de France.

On 29 January 2026, he was loaned by VFC La Roche in the fourth-tier Championnat National 2. There, he scored three goals, helping the club finished first in their group and promoted to the 2026–27 Ligue 3.

On 19 August 2026, Faurand-Tournaire moved to Vietnam, being transferred to V.League 1 club Hanoi FC for an undisclosed transfer fee.

== Personal life ==
Faurand-Tournaire is of Vietnamese descent from his father's side.

== Career statistics ==
As of match played 21 November 2026

Appearances and goals by club, season and competition
| Club | Season | League | | | Cup | | Total | |
| Club | Season | Division | Apps | Goals | Apps | Goals | Apps | Goals |
|---|---|---|---|---|---|---|---|---|
| Laval B | 2022–23 | National 3 | 7 | 1 | — | | 7 | 1 |
| Laval B | 2023–24 | National 3 | 25 | 4 | — | | 25 | 4 |
| Laval B | 2024–25 | National 3 | 21 | 8 | — | | 21 | 8 |
| Laval B | 2025–26 | National 3 | 5 | 3 | — | | 5 | 3 |
| Laval B | Total | | 58 | 16 | — | | 58 | 16 |
| Laval | 2024–25 | Ligue 2 | 6 | 0 | 1 | 0 | 7 | 0 |
| Laval | 2025–26 | Ligue 2 | 9 | 0 | 3 | 3 | 12 | 3 |
| Laval | Total | | 15 | 0 | 4 | 3 | 19 | 3 |
| VFC La Roche (loan) | 2025–26 | National 2 | 12 | 3 | — | | 12 | 3 |
| Hanoi FC | 2026–27 | V.League 1 | 8 | 1 | 1 | 0 | 9 | 1 |
| Career total | | | 93 | 20 | 5 | 3 | 98 | 23 |
