= 2025–26 in French football =

Football in France
- Season: 2025–26

Men's football
- Ligue 1: Paris Saint-Germain
- Ligue 2: Troyes
- Championnat National: Dijon
- Coupe de France: Lens
- Trophée des Champions: Paris Saint-Germain

Women's football
- Première Ligue: OL Lyonnes
- Coupe de France: OL Lyonnes
- Coupe LFFP: OL Lyonnes

The following article is a summary of the 2025–26 football season in France, which was the 92nd season of competitive football in the country and ran from July 2025 to June 2026.

== National team ==
=== France national football team ===
==== Friendlies ====
26 March 2026	Brazil	1–2	France	Foxborough, United States
15:00 EST	Bremer 78'	Report	Mbappé 32'; Ekitike 65'	Stadium: Gillette Stadium; Attendance: 66,215; Referee: Guido Gonzales Jr. (United States)

29 March 2026	Colombia	1–3	France	Landover, Maryland, United States
15:00 EDT	Campaz 77'	Report	Doué 29', 56'; Thuram 41'	Stadium: Northwest Stadium; Attendance: 60,734; Referee: Victor Rivas (United States)

4 June 2026	France	1–2	Ivory Coast	Nantes, France
21:10 UTC+2	Cherki 45'	Report	G. Doué 53'; Amad 84'	Stadium: Stade de la Beaujoire; Attendance: 33,636; Referee: Sebastian Gishamer (Austria)

8 June 2026	France	3–1	Northern Ireland	Villeneuve-d'Ascq, France
19:10 UTC+2	Olise 43', 49', 75'	Report	Kelly 64'	Stadium: Stade Pierre-Mauroy; Attendance: 43,272; Referee: Sascha Stegemann (Germany)

==== 2026 FIFA World Cup qualification ====
===== Group D =====
Pos	Team	Pld	W	D	L	GF	GA	GD	Pts	Qualification	(France national football team)	(Ukraine national football team)	(Iceland national football team)	(Azerbaijan national football team)
1	France	6	5	1	0	16	4	+12	16	Qualification for 2026 FIFA World Cup	—	4–0	2–1	3–0
2	Ukraine	6	3	1	2	10	11	−1	10	Advance to play-offs	0–2	—	2–0	2–1
3	Iceland	6	2	1	3	13	11	+2	7		2–2	3–5	—	5–0
4	Azerbaijan	6	0	1	5	3	16	−13	1		1–3	1–1	0–2	—

Source: FIFA, UEFA

==== 2026 FIFA World Cup ====
===== 2026 FIFA World Cup Group I =====
Pos	Team	Pld	W	D	L	GF	GA	GD	Pts	Qualification
1	France	3	3	0	0	10	2	+8	9	Advance to knockout stage
2	Norway	3	2	0	1	8	7	+1	6	Advance to knockout stage
3	Senegal	3	1	0	2	8	6	+2	3	Advance to knockout stage
4	Iraq	3	0	0	3	1	12	−11	0	

Source: FIFA
Rules for classification: Group stage tiebreakers

16 June 2026 1	France	3–1	Senegal	East Rutherford, United States
15:00 EDT	Mbappé 66', 90+6'; Barcola 82'	Report	Mbaye 90+5'	Stadium: MetLife Stadium; Attendance: 80,545; Referee: Alireza Faghani (Australia)

22 June 2026 2	France	3–0	Iraq	Philadelphia, United States
17:00 EDT	Mbappé 14', 54'; Dembélé 66'	Report		Stadium: Lincoln Financial Field; Attendance: 69,879; Referee: Drew Fischer (Canada)

26 June 2026 3	Norway	1–4	France	Foxborough, United States
15:00 EDT	Aasgaard 21'	Report	Dembélé 7', 20', 32'; Doué 90+4'	Stadium: Gillette Stadium; Attendance: 64,146; Referee: Michael Oliver (England)

===== 2026 FIFA World Cup knockout stage =====
30 June 2026 R32	France	3–0	Sweden	East Rutherford, United States
17:00 EDT	Mbappé 45', 74'; Barcola 53'	Report		Stadium: MetLife Stadium; Attendance: 80,663; Referee: Danny Makkelie (Netherlands)

4 July 2026 R16	Paraguay	0–1	France	Philadelphia, United States
17:00 EDT		Report	Mbappé 70' (pen.)	Stadium: Lincoln Financial Field; Attendance: 68,324; Referee: Ilgiz Tantashev (Uzbekistan)

9 July 2026 QF	France	2–0	Morocco	Foxborough, Massachusetts, United States
16:00 EDT	Mbappé 60'; Dembélé 66'	Report		Stadium: Gillette Stadium; Attendance: 63,881; Referee: Facundo Tello (Argentina)

14 July 2026 SF	France	0–2	Spain	Arlington, Texas, United States
14:00 UTC−5		Report	Oyarzabal 22' (pen.); Porro 58'	Stadium: AT&T Stadium; Attendance: 70,176; Referee: Iván Barton (El Salvador)

18 July 2026 3rd	France	4–6	England	Miami Gardens, United States
17:00 EDT (UTC-4)	Mbappé 48', 66'; Barcola 54'; Dembélé 90+6'	Report	Rice 3'; Konsa 18'; Saka 37', 45+1', 87' (pen.); Bellingham 90+8'	Stadium: Hard Rock Stadium; Attendance: 64,478; Referee: Jesús Valenzuela (Venezuela)

=== U-20 ===
==== 2025 FIFA U-20 World Cup ====
===== Group E =====
Pos	Team	Pld	W	D	L	GF	GA	GD	Pts	Qualification
1	United States	3	2	0	1	13	3	+10	6 (Note: Tied on head-to-head points (3). Head-to-head goal difference: United States +2, South Africa 0, France −2.)	Knockout stage
2	South Africa	3	2	0	1	8	3	+5	6	Knockout stage
3	France	3	2	0	1	8	4	+4	6	Knockout stage
4	New Caledonia	3	0	0	3	1	20	−19	0	

Source: FIFA
Rules for classification: Group stage tiebreakers

===== Knockout stage =====
8 October 2025 R16	Japan	0–1 (a.e.t.)	France	Estadio Nacional Julio Martínez Prádanos, Santiago
20:00		Report	Michal 120+3' (pen.)	Attendance: 12,405; Referee: Katia Itzel García (Mexico)

12 October 2025 QF	Norway	1–2	France	Estadio Elías Figueroa Brander, Valparaíso
20:00	Holten 83'	Report	Bouabré 19', 37'	Attendance: 7,742; Referee: Irfan Peljto (Bosnia and Herzegovina)

15 October 2025 SF	Morocco	1–1 (a.e.t.) (5–4 p)	France	Estadio Elías Figueroa Brander, Valparaíso
17:00	Olmeta 32' (o.g.)	Report	Michal 59'	Attendance: 11,300; Referee: Gustavo Tejera (Uruguay)
	Penalties
	El Bahraoui (penalty scored); Boumassaoudi (penalty scored); Zabiri (penalty scored); Hamony (penalty missed); El Haddad (penalty scored); Byar (penalty scored)		(penalty scored) Michal; (penalty missed) Beyuku; (penalty scored) Zidane; (penalty scored) Bernardeau; (penalty scored) Dabo; (penalty missed) N'Guessan

18 October 3rd place	Colombia	1–0	France	Estadio Nacional Julio Martínez Prádanos, Santiago
16:00	Perea 2'	Report		Attendance: 21,053; Referee: Omar Artan (Somalia)

=== France women's national football team ===
==== UEFA Women's Euro 2025 ====
===== UEFA Women's Euro 2025 Group D =====
Pos	Team	Pld	W	D	L	GF	GA	GD	Pts	Qualification
1	France	3	3	0	0	11	4	+7	9	Advance to knockout stage
2	England	3	2	0	1	11	3	+8	6	Advance to knockout stage
3	Netherlands	3	1	0	2	5	9	−4	3	
4	Wales	3	0	0	3	2	13	−11	0	

Source: UEFA
Rules for classification: Group stage tiebreakers

==== 2027 FIFA Women's World Cup qualification ====
===== 2027 FIFA Women's World Cup qualification – UEFA League A Group A2 =====
Pos	Team	Pld	W	D	L	GF	GA	GD	Pts	Qualification or relegation
1	France	6	4	1	1	11	5	+6	13	Qualification to 2027 FIFA Women's World Cup
2	Netherlands	6	3	2	1	12	9	+3	11	Advance to play-offs
3	Republic of Ireland	6	3	0	3	9	9	0	9	Advance to play-offs
4	Poland (R)	6	0	1	5	6	15	−9	1	Advance to play-offs and relegation to League B

Source: UEFA
Rules for classification: Tiebreakers
(R) Relegated

=== U–17 ===
==== FIFA U-17 Women's World Cup ====
===== Group D =====
Pos	Team	Pld	W	D	L	GF	GA	GD	Pts	Qualification
1	Canada	1	1	0	0	4	1	+3	3	Knockout stage
2	France	1	1	0	0	4	2	+2	3	Knockout stage
3	Samoa	1	0	0	1	2	4	−2	0	Possible knockout stage
4	Nigeria	1	0	0	1	1	4	−3	0	

Updated to match(es) played on 19 October 2025. Source: FIFA
Rules for classification: Group stage tiebreakers

== UEFA competitions ==
=== UEFA Super Cup ===
13 August 2025
21:00 UTC+2

Paris Saint-Germain (French Football Federation)	2–2	(The Football Association) Tottenham Hotspur
Lee Kang-in 85'; Ramos 90+4'	Report	Van de Ven 39'; Romero 48'
Penalties
Vitinha (penalty missed); Ramos (penalty scored); Dembélé (penalty scored); Lee Kang-in (penalty scored); Mendes (penalty scored)	4–3	(penalty scored) Solanke; (penalty scored) Bentancur; (penalty missed) Van de Ven; (penalty missed) Tel; (penalty scored) Porro

Stadio Friuli, Udine
Attendance: 21,025
Referee: João Pinheiro (Portugal)

=== UEFA Champions League ===
==== Qualiying round ====
===== Third qualifying round =====
Third qualifying round
Team 1	Agg.	Team 2	1st leg	2nd leg
Nice (France)	0–4	(Portugal) Benfica	0–2	0–2

==== League phase ====
===== Marseille =====
Pos	Team	Pld	W	D	L	GF	GA	GD	Pts	Qualification
23	(Norwegian Football Federation) Bodø/Glimt	8	2	3	3	14	15	−1	9	Advance to knockout phase play-offs (unseeded)
24	(Portuguese Football Federation) Benfica	8	3	0	5	10	12	−2	9	Advance to knockout phase play-offs (unseeded)
25	(French Football Federation) Marseille	8	3	0	5	11	14	−3	9	
26	(Cyprus Football Association) Pafos	8	2	3	3	8	11	−3	9	
27	(Royal Belgian Football Association) Union Saint-Gilloise	8	3	0	5	8	17	−9	9	

Source: UEFA
Rules for classification: League phase tiebreakers

Home team	Score	Away team
Real Madrid (Spain)	2–1	(France) Marseille
Marseille (France)	4–0	(Netherlands) Ajax
Sporting CP (Portugal)	2–1	(France) Marseille
Marseille (France)	0–1	(Italy) Atalanta
Marseille (France)	2–1	(England) Newcastle United
Union Saint-Gilloise (Belgium)	2–3	(France) Marseille
Marseille (France)	0–3	(England) Liverpool
Club Brugge (Belgium)	3–0	(France) Marseille

===== Monaco =====
Pos	Team	Pld	W	D	L	GF	GA	GD	Pts	Qualification
19	(Royal Belgian Football Association) Club Brugge	8	3	1	4	15	17	−2	10	Advance to knockout phase play-offs (unseeded)
20	(Turkish Football Federation) Galatasaray	8	3	1	4	9	11	−2	10	Advance to knockout phase play-offs (unseeded)
21	(French Football Federation) Monaco	8	2	4	2	8	14	−6	10	Advance to knockout phase play-offs (unseeded)
22	(Association of Football Federations of Azerbaijan) Qarabağ	8	3	1	4	13	21	−8	10	Advance to knockout phase play-offs (unseeded)
23	(Norwegian Football Federation) Bodø/Glimt	8	2	3	3	14	15	−1	9	Advance to knockout phase play-offs (unseeded)

Source: UEFA
Rules for classification: League phase tiebreakers

Home team	Score	Away team
Club Brugge (Belgium)	4–1	(France) Monaco
Monaco (France)	2–2	(England) Manchester City
Monaco (France)	0–0	(England) Tottenham Hotspur
Bodø/Glimt (Norway)	0–1	(France) Monaco
Pafos (Cyprus)	2–2	(France) Monaco
Monaco (France)	1–0	(Turkey) Galatasaray
Real Madrid (Spain)	6–1	(France) Monaco
Monaco (France)	0–0	(Italy) Juventus

===== Paris Saint-Germain =====
Pos	Team	Pld	W	D	L	GF	GA	GD	Pts	Qualification
9	(Royal Spanish Football Federation) Real Madrid	8	5	0	3	21	12	+9	15	Advance to knockout phase play-offs (seeded)
10	(Italian Football Federation) Inter Milan	8	5	0	3	15	7	+8	15	Advance to knockout phase play-offs (seeded)
11	(French Football Federation) Paris Saint-Germain	8	4	2	2	21	11	+10	14	Advance to knockout phase play-offs (seeded)
12	(The Football Association) Newcastle United	8	4	2	2	17	7	+10	14	Advance to knockout phase play-offs (seeded)
13	(Italian Football Federation) Juventus	8	3	4	1	14	10	+4	13	Advance to knockout phase play-offs (seeded)

Source: UEFA
Rules for classification: League phase tiebreakers

Home team	Score	Away team
Paris Saint-Germain (France)	4–0	(Italy) Atalanta
Barcelona (Spain)	1–2	(France) Paris Saint-Germain
Bayer Leverkusen (Germany)	2–7	(France) Paris Saint-Germain
Paris Saint-Germain (France)	1–2	(Germany) Bayern Munich
Paris Saint-Germain (France)	5–3	(England) Tottenham Hotspur
Athletic Bilbao (Spain)	0–0	(France) Paris Saint-Germain
Sporting CP (Portugal)	2–1	(France) Paris Saint-Germain
Paris Saint-Germain (France)	1–1	(England) Newcastle United

==== Knockout phase ====
===== Knockout phase play-offs =====
Team 1	Agg.	Team 2	1st leg	2nd leg
Monaco (France)	4–5	(France) Paris Saint-Germain	2–3	2–2

===== Round of 16 =====
Team 1	Agg.	Team 2	1st leg	2nd leg
Paris Saint-Germain (France)	8–2	(England) Chelsea	5–2	3–0

===== Quarter-finals =====
Team 1	Agg.	Team 2	1st leg	2nd leg
Paris Saint-Germain (France)	4–0	(England) Liverpool	2–0	2–0

===== Semi-finals =====
Team 1	Agg.	Team 2	1st leg	2nd leg
Paris Saint-Germain (France)	6–5	(Germany) Bayern Munich	5–4	1–1

===== Final =====
30 May 2026
18:00 UTC+2

Paris Saint-Germain (French Football Federation)	1–1 (a.e.t.)	(The Football Association) Arsenal
Dembélé 65' (pen.)	Report	Havertz 6'
Penalties
Ramos (penalty scored); Doué (penalty scored); Mendes (penalty missed); Hakimi (penalty scored); Beraldo (penalty scored)	4–3	(penalty scored) Gyökeres; (penalty missed) Eze; (penalty scored) Rice; (penalty scored) Martinelli; (penalty missed) Gabriel

Puskás Aréna, Budapest
Attendance: 61,035
Referee: Daniel Siebert (Germany)

=== UEFA Europa League ===
==== League phase ====
===== Lille =====
Pos	Team	Pld	W	D	L	GF	GA	GD	Pts	Qualification
16	(Royal Spanish Football Federation) Celta Vigo	8	4	1	3	15	11	+4	13	Advance to knockout phase play-offs (seeded)
17	(Hellenic Football Federation) PAOK	8	3	3	2	17	14	+3	12	Advance to knockout phase play-offs (unseeded)
18	(French Football Federation) Lille	8	4	0	4	12	9	+3	12	Advance to knockout phase play-offs (unseeded)
19	(Turkish Football Federation) Fenerbahçe	8	3	3	2	10	7	+3	12	Advance to knockout phase play-offs (unseeded)
20	(Hellenic Football Federation) Panathinaikos	8	3	3	2	11	9	+2	12	Advance to knockout phase play-offs (unseeded)

Source: UEFA
Rules for classification: League phase tiebreakers

Home team	Score	Away team
Lille (France)	2–1	(Norway) Brann
Roma (Italy)	0–1	(France) Lille
Lille (France)	3–4	(Greece) PAOK
Red Star Belgrade (Serbia)	1–0	(France) Lille
Lille (France)	4–0	(Croatia) Dinamo Zagreb
Young Boys (Switzerland)	1–0	(France) Lille
Celta Vigo (Spain)	2–1	(France) Lille
Lille (France)	1–0	(Germany) SC Freiburg

===== Lyon =====
Pos	Team	Pld	W	D	L	GF	GA	GD	Pts	Qualification
1	(French Football Federation) Lyon	8	7	0	1	18	5	+13	21	Advance to round of 16 (seeded)
2	(The Football Association) Aston Villa	8	7	0	1	14	6	+8	21	Advance to round of 16 (seeded)
3	(Danish Football Association) Midtjylland	8	6	1	1	18	8	+10	19	Advance to round of 16 (seeded)
4	(Royal Spanish Football Federation) Real Betis	8	5	2	1	13	7	+6	17 (Note: Away goals scored: Real Betis 5, Porto 3.)	Advance to round of 16 (seeded)
5	(Portuguese Football Federation) Porto	8	5	2	1	13	7	+6	17	Advance to round of 16 (seeded)

Source: UEFA
Rules for classification: League phase tiebreakers
Notes:

Home team	Score	Away team
Utrecht (Netherlands)	0–1	(France) Lyon
Lyon (France)	2–0	(Austria) Red Bull Salzburg
Lyon (France)	2–0	(Switzerland) Basel
Real Betis (Spain)	2–0	(France) Lyon
Maccabi Tel Aviv (Israel)	0–6	(France) Lyon
Lyon (France)	2–1	(Netherlands) Go Ahead Eagles
Young Boys (Switzerland)	0–1	(France) Lyon
Lyon (France)	4–2	(Greece) PAOK

===== Nice =====
Pos	Team	Pld	W	D	L	GF	GA	GD	Pts
31	(Austrian Football Association) Red Bull Salzburg	8	2	0	6	10	15	−5	6
32	(Scottish Football Association) Rangers	8	1	1	6	5	14	−9	4
33	(French Football Federation) Nice	8	1	0	7	7	15	−8	3
34	(Royal Dutch Football Association) Utrecht	8	0	1	7	5	15	−10	1
35	(Swedish Football Association) Malmö FF	8	0	1	7	4	15	−11	1

Source: UEFA
Rules for classification: League phase tiebreakers

Home team	Score	Away team
Nice (France)	1–2	(Italy) Roma
Fenerbahçe (Turkey)	2–1	(France) Nice
Celta Vigo (Spain)	2–1	(France) Nice
Nice (France)	1–3	(Germany) SC Freiburg
Porto (Portugal)	3–0	(France) Nice
Nice (France)	0–1	(Portugal) Braga
Nice (France)	3–1	(Netherlands) Go Ahead Eagles
Ludogorets Razgrad (Bulgaria)	1–0	(France) Nice

==== Knockout phase ====
===== Knockout phase play-offs =====
Team 1	Agg.	Team 2	1st leg	2nd leg
Lille (France)	2–1	(Serbia) Red Star Belgrade	0–1	2–0 (a.e.t.)

===== Round of 16 =====
Team 1	Agg.	Team 2	1st leg	2nd leg
Celta Vigo (Spain)	3–1	(France) Lyon	1–1	2–0
Lille (France)	0–3	(England) Aston Villa	0–1	0–2

=== UEFA Conference League ===
==== Qualifying round ====
===== Play-off round =====
Play-off round
Team 1	Agg.	Team 2	1st leg	2nd leg
Strasbourg (France)	3–2	(Denmark) Brøndby	0–0	3–2

==== League phase ====
===== Strasbourg =====
Pos	Team	Pld	W	D	L	GF	GA	GD	Pts	Qualification
1	(French Football Federation) Strasbourg	6	5	1	0	11	5	+6	16	Advance to round of 16 (seeded)
2	(Polish Football Association) Raków Częstochowa	6	4	2	0	9	2	+7	14	Advance to round of 16 (seeded)
3	(Hellenic Football Federation) AEK Athens	6	4	1	1	14	7	+7	13	Advance to round of 16 (seeded)
4	(Football Association of the Czech Republic) Sparta Prague	6	4	1	1	10	3	+7	13	Advance to round of 16 (seeded)
5	(Royal Spanish Football Federation) Rayo Vallecano	6	4	1	1	13	7	+6	13	Advance to round of 16 (seeded)

Source: UEFA
Rules for classification: League phase tiebreakers

Home team	Score	Away team
Slovan Bratislava (Slovakia)	1–2	(France) Strasbourg
Strasbourg (France)	1–1	(Poland) Jagiellonia Białystok
BK Häcken (Sweden)	1–2	(France) Strasbourg
Strasbourg (France)	2–1	(England) Crystal Palace
Aberdeen (Scotland)	0–1	(France) Strasbourg
Strasbourg (France)	3–1	(Iceland) Breiðablik

==== Knockout phase ====
===== Round of 16 =====
Team 1	Agg.	Team 2	1st leg	2nd leg
Rijeka (Croatia)	2–3	(France) Strasbourg	1–2	1–1

===== Quarter-finals =====
Team 1	Agg.	Team 2	1st leg	2nd leg
Mainz 05 (Germany)	2–4	(France) Strasbourg	2–0	0–4

===== Semi-finals =====
Team 1	Agg.	Team 2	1st leg	2nd leg
Rayo Vallecano (Spain)	2–0	(France) Strasbourg	1–0	1–0

=== UEFA Women's Champions League ===
==== Qualifying round ====
===== Third qualifying round =====
Third qualifying round
Team 1	Agg.	Team 2	1st leg	2nd leg
Paris FC (France)	2–0	Austria Wien	0–0	2–0

==== League stage ====
===== Lyon =====
Pos	Team	Pld	W	D	L	GF	GA	GD	Pts	Qualification
1	(Royal Spanish Football Federation) Barcelona	6	5	1	0	20	3	+17	16	Advance to the quarter-finals (seeded)
2	(French Football Federation) OL Lyonnes	6	5	1	0	18	5	+13	16	Advance to the quarter-finals (seeded)
3	(The Football Association) Chelsea	6	4	2	0	20	3	+17	14	Advance to the quarter-finals (seeded)
4	(German Football Association) Bayern Munich	6	4	1	1	14	13	+1	13	Advance to the quarter-finals (seeded)
5	(The Football Association) Arsenal	6	4	0	2	11	6	+5	12	Advance to the knockout phase play-offs (seeded)

Source: UEFA
Rules for classification: League phase tiebreakers

Home team	Score	Away team
Arsenal (England)	1–2	(France) Lyon
Lyon (France)	3–0	(Austria) St. Pölten
Lyon (France)	3–1	(Germany) VfL Wolfsburg
Juventus (Italy)	3–3	(France) Lyon
Manchester United (England)	0–3	(France) Lyon
Lyon (France)	4–0	(Spain) Atlético Madrid

===== Paris FC =====
Pos	Team	Pld	W	D	L	GF	GA	GD	Pts	Qualification
8	(Italian Football Federation) Juventus	6	3	1	2	13	8	+5	10	Advance to the knockout phase play-offs (seeded)
9	(German Football Association) VfL Wolfsburg	6	3	0	3	13	10	+3	9	Advance to the knockout phase play-offs (unseeded)
10	(French Football Federation) Paris FC	6	2	2	2	6	9	−3	8	Advance to the knockout phase play-offs (unseeded)
11	(Royal Spanish Football Federation) Atlético Madrid	6	2	1	3	13	9	+4	7	Advance to the knockout phase play-offs (unseeded)
12	(Royal Belgian Football Association) OH Leuven	6	1	3	2	5	10	−5	6	Advance to the knockout phase play-offs (unseeded)

Source: UEFA
Rules for classification: League phase tiebreakers

Home team	Score	Away team
Paris FC (France)	2–2	(Belgium) OH Leuven
Chelsea (England)	4–0	(France) Paris FC
Real Madrid (Spain)	1–1	(France) Paris FC
Paris FC (France)	2–0	(Portugal) Benfica
Vålerenga (Norway)	0–1	(France) Paris FC
Paris FC (France)	0–2	(Spain) Barcelona

===== Paris Saint-Germain =====
Pos	Team	Pld	W	D	L	GF	GA	GD	Pts
14	(Italian Football Federation) Roma	6	1	1	4	9	19	−10	4
15	(Royal Dutch Football Association) Twente	6	0	3	3	4	10	−6	3
16	(Portuguese Football Federation) Benfica	6	0	2	4	4	11	−7	2
17	(French Football Federation) Paris Saint-Germain	6	0	2	4	4	12	−8	2
18	(Austrian Football Association) St. Pölten	6	0	1	5	3	28	−25	1

Source: UEFA
Rules for classification: League phase tiebreakers

Home team	Score	Away team
VfL Wolfsburg (Germany)	4–0	(France) Paris Saint-Germain
Paris Saint-Germain (France)	1–2	(Spain) Real Madrid
Manchester United (England)	2–1	(France) Paris Saint-Germain
Paris Saint-Germain (France)	1–3	(Germany) Bayern Munich
Paris Saint-Germain (France)	0–0	(Belgium) OH Leuven
Benfica (Portugal)	1–1	(France) Paris Saint-Germain

==== Knockout phase ====
===== Knockout phase play-offs =====
Team 1	Agg.	Team 2	1st leg	2nd leg
Paris FC (France)	2–5	(Spain) Real Madrid	2–3	0–2

===== Quarter-finals =====
Team 1	Agg.	Team 2	1st leg	2nd leg
VfL Wolfsburg (Germany)	1–4	(France) Lyon	1–0	0–4 (a.e.t.)

===== Semi-finals =====
Team 1	Agg.	Team 2	1st leg	2nd leg
Arsenal (England)	3–4	(France) Lyon	2–1	1–3

===== Final =====
23 May 2026
18:00 UTC+2

Barcelona (Spain)	4–0	(France) OL Lyonnes
Pajor 55', 69'; Paralluelo 90', 90+3'	Report

Ullevaal Stadion, Oslo
Attendance: 24,258
Referee: Tess Olofsson (Sweden)

=== UEFA Youth League ===
==== UEFA Champions League Path ====
===== Marseille =====
Pos	Team	Pld	W	D	L	GF	GA	GD	Pts	Qualification
20	(Football Association of the Czech Republic) Slavia Prague	6	2	2	2	16	17	−1	8	Advance to knockout phase
21	(German Football Association) Eintracht Frankfurt	6	2	1	3	15	13	+2	7	Advance to knockout phase
22	(French Football Federation) Marseille	6	2	1	3	12	11	+1	7	Advance to knockout phase
23	(Danish Football Association) Copenhagen	6	2	1	3	10	10	0	7	
24	(Hellenic Football Federation) Olympiacos	6	2	1	3	8	10	−2	7	

Source: UEFA
Rules for classification: League phase tiebreakers

Home team	Score	Away team
Real Madrid (Spain)	3–2	(France) Marseille
Marseille (France)	3–5	(Netherlands) Ajax
Sporting CP (Portugal)	2–1	(France) Marseille
Marseille (France)	0–0	(Italy) Atalanta
Marseille (France)	2–0	(England) Newcastle United
Union Saint-Gilloise (Belgium)	1–4	(France) Marseille

===== Monaco =====
Pos	Team	Pld	W	D	L	GF	GA	GD	Pts	Qualification
16	(The Football Association) Liverpool	6	3	1	2	8	13	−5	10	Advance to knockout phase
17	(German Football Association) Bayer Leverkusen	6	3	1	2	9	16	−7	10	Advance to knockout phase
18	(French Football Federation) Monaco	6	3	0	3	20	10	+10	9	Advance to knockout phase
19	(Royal Dutch Football Association) PSV Eindhoven	6	2	2	2	13	9	+4	8	Advance to knockout phase
20	(Football Association of the Czech Republic) Slavia Prague	6	2	2	2	16	17	−1	8	Advance to knockout phase

Source: UEFA
Rules for classification: League phase tiebreakers

Home team	Score	Away team
Club Brugge (Belgium)	1–0	(France) Monaco
Monaco (France)	3–5	(England) Manchester City
Monaco (France)	2–4	(England) Tottenham Hotspur
Bodø/Glimt (Norway)	0–7	(France) Monaco
Pafos (Cyprus)	0–3	(France) Monaco
Monaco (France)	5–0	(Turkey) Galatasaray

===== Paris Saint-Germain =====
Pos	Team	Pld	W	D	L	GF	GA	GD	Pts	Qualification
11	(German Football Association) Borussia Dortmund	6	4	0	2	13	8	+5	12	Advance to knockout phase
12	(Portuguese Football Federation) Sporting CP	6	3	3	0	13	10	+3	12	Advance to knockout phase
13	(French Football Federation) Paris Saint-Germain	6	3	2	1	17	8	+9	11	Advance to knockout phase
14	(Italian Football Federation) Inter Milan	6	3	2	1	14	8	+6	11	Advance to knockout phase
15	(Royal Dutch Football Association) Ajax	6	3	1	2	24	16	+8	10	Advance to knockout phase

Source: UEFA
Rules for classification: League phase tiebreakers

Home team	Score	Away team
Paris Saint-Germain (France)	5–1	(Italy) Atalanta
Barcelona (Spain)	2–1	(France) Paris Saint-Germain
Bayer Leverkusen (Germany)	2–2	(France) Paris Saint-Germain
Paris Saint-Germain (France)	3–0	(Germany) Bayern Munich
Paris Saint-Germain (France)	5–2	(England) Tottenham Hotspur
Athletic Bilbao (Spain)	1–1	(France) Paris Saint-Germain

==== Domestic Champions Path ====
===== Second round =====
Team 1	Agg.	Team 2	1st leg	2nd leg
Nantes (France)	7–1	(Azerbaijan) Sabah	5–0	2–1

===== Third round =====
Team 1	Agg.	Team 2	1st leg	2nd leg
Maccabi Haifa (Israel)	4–2	(France) Nantes	1–0	3–2

==== Knockout phase ====
===== Round of 32 =====
Home team	Score	Away team
Club Brugge (Belgium)	3–2	(France) Monaco
Real Madrid (Spain)	5–2	(France) Marseille
Paris Saint-Germain (France)	4–0	(Belarus) Dinamo Minsk

===== Round of 16 =====
Home team	Score	Away team
Paris Saint-Germain (France)	6–1	(Finland) HJK

===== Quarter-finals =====
Home team	Score	Away team
Villarreal (Spain)	0–1	(France) Paris Saint-Germain

===== Semi-finals =====
Home team	Score	Away team
Real Madrid (Spain)	1–1 (5–4 p)	(France) Paris Saint-Germain

== League season ==
=== Men ===
==== Ligue 1 ====
Pos	Team	Pld	W	D	L	GF	GA	GD	Pts	Qualification or relegation
1	Paris Saint-Germain (C)	34	24	4	6	74	29	+45	76	Qualification for the Champions League league phase
2	Lens	34	22	4	8	66	35	+31	70	Qualification for the Champions League league phase
3	Lille	34	18	7	9	52	37	+15	61	Qualification for the Champions League league phase
4	Lyon	34	18	6	10	53	40	+13	60	Qualification for the Champions League third qualifying round
5	Marseille	34	18	5	11	63	45	+18	59	Qualification for the Europa League league phase (Note: Since the 2025–26 Coupe de France winners, Lens, qualified for the Champions League via league position, the Europa League spot awarded to the cup winners was passed to the sixth-placed team, and the Conference League spot was passed to the seventh-placed team.)
6	Rennes	34	17	8	9	59	50	+9	59	Qualification for the Europa League league phase
7	Monaco	34	16	6	12	60	54	+6	54	Qualification for the Conference League play-off round
8	Strasbourg	34	15	8	11	58	47	+11	53	
9	Toulouse	34	12	9	13	47	46	+1	45	
10	Lorient	34	11	12	11	48	51	−3	45	
11	Paris FC	34	11	11	12	47	50	−3	44	
12	Brest	34	10	9	15	43	55	−12	39	
13	Angers	34	9	9	16	29	48	−19	36	
14	Le Havre	34	7	14	13	32	44	−12	35	
15	Auxerre	34	8	10	16	34	44	−10	34	
16	Nice (O)	34	7	11	16	37	60	−23	32	Qualification for the relegation play-offs
17	Nantes (R)	34	5	9	20	29	52	−23	24	Relegation to Ligue 2
18	Metz (R)	34	3	8	23	32	76	−44	17	Relegation to Ligue 2

Source: Ligue 1
Rules for classification: 1) Points; 2) Goal difference; 3) Head-to-head points; 4) Head-to-head goal difference; 5) Head-to-head goals scored; 6) Head-to-head away goals scored; 7) Goals scored; 8) Away goals scored; 9) Fair-play points (Note: Head-to-head record is used only after all the matches between the teams in question have been played).
(C) Champions; (O) Play-off winners; (R) Relegated

==== Ligue 2 ====
Pos	Team	Pld	W	D	L	GF	GA	GD	Pts	Promotion or Relegation
1	Troyes (C, P)	34	20	7	7	60	33	+27	67	Promotion to Ligue 1
2	Le Mans (P)	34	16	14	4	50	31	+19	62	Promotion to Ligue 1
3	Saint-Étienne	34	18	6	10	59	38	+21	60	Qualification for promotion play-off semi-final
4	Red Star	34	16	10	8	45	37	+8	58	Qualification for promotion play-off quarter-final
5	Rodez	34	15	13	6	45	39	+6	58	Qualification for promotion play-off quarter-final
6	Reims	34	14	14	6	53	35	+18	56	
7	Annecy	34	15	7	12	49	39	+10	52	
8	Montpellier	34	14	9	11	41	31	+10	51	
9	Pau	34	12	9	13	48	62	−14	45	
10	Dunkerque	34	11	10	13	53	45	+8	43	
11	Guingamp	34	10	10	14	42	49	−7	40	
12	Grenoble	34	8	15	11	33	39	−6	39	
13	Clermont	34	9	10	15	38	44	−6	37	
14	Nancy	34	9	10	15	35	52	−17	37	
15	Boulogne	34	9	9	16	34	49	−15	36	
16	Laval (O)	34	6	14	14	30	48	−18	32	Qualification for relegation play-off
17	Bastia (R)	34	5	13	16	23	39	−16	28	Relegation to Ligue 3
18	Amiens (R)	34	6	6	22	37	65	−28	24	Relegation to Ligue 3

Source: Ligue 2
Rules for classification: 1) Points; 2) Goal difference; 3) Number of goals scored; 4) Head-to-head goal difference; 5) Fair play points
(C) Champions; (O) Play-off winners; (P) Promoted; (R) Relegated

==== Championnat National ====
Pos	Team	Pld	W	D	L	GF	GA	GD	Pts	Promotion, qualification or relegation
1	Dijon (C, P)	32	18	11	3	52	25	+27	65	Promotion to Ligue 2
2	Sochaux (P)	32	16	10	6	51	26	+25	58	Promotion to Ligue 2
3	Rouen	32	14	13	5	43	29	+14	55	Qualification to promotion play-offs
4	Fleury	32	15	9	8	47	30	+17	54	Qualification to Ligue 3
5	Versailles	32	15	8	9	46	34	+12	53	Qualification to Ligue 3
6	Orléans	32	14	9	9	42	42	0	51	Qualification to Ligue 3
7	Le Puy	32	12	11	9	45	38	+7	47	Qualification to Ligue 3
8	Caen	32	8	16	8	39	34	+5	40	Qualification to Ligue 3
9	Concarneau	32	8	14	10	32	37	−5	38	Qualification to Ligue 3
10	Valenciennes	32	10	8	14	35	44	−9	37 (Note: Valenciennes were deducted 1 point due to the abandonment of their home game on 12 December against Sochaux.)	Qualification to Ligue 3
11	Aubagne Air Bel	32	9	10	13	38	46	−8	37	Qualification to Ligue 3
12	Villefranche	32	10	7	15	34	45	−11	37	Qualification to Ligue 3
13	Quevilly-Rouen	32	8	9	15	34	45	−11	33	Qualification to Ligue 3
14	Paris 13 Atletico	32	7	11	14	26	41	−15	32	Qualification to Ligue 3
15	Bourg-Péronnas	32	8	7	17	25	44	−19	31	Qualification to Ligue 3
16	Châteauroux (R)	32	6	13	13	35	49	−14	30 (Note: Châteauroux were deducted 1 point.)	Relegation to the National 1
17	Stade Briochin (R)	32	5	12	15	35	50	−15	27	Relegation to the National 1
18	Ajaccio (D, R)	0	0	0	0	0	0	0	0 (Note: Ajaccio were excluded from all French national competitions by the FFF on 14 August 2025 and their record was expunged.)	Excluded

Source: NATIONAL
Rules for classification: 1) head-to-head results; 2) head-to-head goal difference; 3) goal difference; 4) goals scored; 5) fair play points
(C) Champions; (D) Disqualified; (P) Promoted; (R) Relegated

==== Championnat National 2 ====
Pos	Team	Pld	W	D	L	GF	GA	GD	Pts	Promotion or relegation
1	La Roche (C, P)	30	19	8	3	61	27	+34	65	Promotion to Ligue 3
2	Bordeaux (Note: Bordeaux were excluded from the national championships due to financial mismanagement.) (D, R)	30	19	5	6	51	28	+23	62	Demoted to Régional
3	Bayonne	30	17	4	9	42	27	+15	55	
4	Saint-Malo	30	13	11	6	43	29	+14	50	
5	Les Herbiers	30	14	7	9	45	33	+12	49	
6	Angoulême	30	11	10	9	33	36	−3	43	
7	Dinan Léhon	30	12	5	13	44	45	−1	41	
8	Avranches	30	10	10	10	46	41	+5	40	
9	Chauray	30	11	5	14	35	38	−3	38	
10	Saint-Colomban Locminé	30	9	10	11	31	34	−3	37	
11	Montlouis	30	7	10	13	42	50	−8	31	
12	Lorient (res)	30	9	5	16	38	51	−13	31 (Note: Lorient (res) were deducted one point.)	
13	Châteaubriant	30	8	6	16	25	47	−22	30	
14	Granville	30	6	11	13	32	41	−9	29	Spared from relegation
15	Saumur	30	6	10	14	37	56	−19	28	Spared from relegation
16	Stade Poitevin (Note: Stade Poitevin were excluded from the national championships due to financial mismanagement.) (D, R)	30	5	11	14	21	43	−22	25 (Note: Stade Poitevin were deducted one point.)	Demoted to Régional

Source: soccerway, fff
Rules for classification: 1) points; 2) head-to-head results; 3) head-to-head goal difference; 4) goal difference; 5) number of goals scored; 6) fair play points; 7) draw
(C) Champions; (D) Disqualified; (P) Promoted; (R) Relegated
Notes:

Pos	Team	Pld	W	D	L	GF	GA	GD	Pts	Promotion or relegation
1	Thionville (C, P)	30	18	6	6	53	36	+17	60	Promotion to Ligue 3
2	Bourges	30	14	10	6	35	24	+11	52	
3	Haguenau	30	14	9	7	43	29	+14	51	
4	Feignies Aulnoye	30	12	10	8	41	24	+17	46	
5	Furiani-Agliani	30	13	6	11	45	40	+5	45	
6	Saint-Pryvé Saint-Hilaire	30	12	6	12	48	44	+4	42	
7	Dieppe	30	11	8	11	31	36	−5	41	
8	Borgo	30	11	7	12	32	37	−5	40	
9	Épinal	30	11	7	12	32	37	−5	40	
10	Biesheim	30	10	10	10	31	37	−6	39 (Note: Biesheim were deducted one point.)	
11	Colmar	30	9	11	10	41	43	−2	37 (Note: Colmar were deducted one point.)	
12	Beauvais (D, R)	30	9	11	10	39	42	−3	35 (Note: Beauvais were deducted three points.)	Demoted to Régional
13	Wasquehal (D, R)	30	10	4	16	28	44	−16	34	Demoted to Régional
14	Chambly	30	9	10	11	35	35	0	34 (Note: Chambly were deducted three points.)	Spared from relegation
15	Chantilly	30	6	9	15	32	42	−10	27	Spared from relegation
16	Blois (R)	30	7	4	19	31	47	−16	25	Relegation to National 2

Source: soccerway, fff
Rules for classification: 1) points; 2) head-to-head results; 3) head-to-head goal difference; 4) goal difference; 5) number of goals scored; 6) fair play points; 7) draw
(C) Champions; (D) Disqualified; (P) Promoted; (R) Relegated
Notes:

Pos	Team	Pld	W	D	L	GF	GA	GD	Pts	Promotion or relegation
1	Cannes (C, P)	30	17	9	4	53	30	+23	60	Promotion to Ligue 3
2	Nîmes	30	18	5	7	46	25	+21	59	
3	Lusitanos Saint-Maur	30	15	10	5	40	24	+16	55	
4	Rumilly-Vallières	30	13	8	9	49	36	+13	47	
5	Hyères	30	11	12	7	36	27	+9	45	
6	Andrézieux	30	12	9	9	48	33	+15	45	
7	Istres	30	11	10	9	42	32	+10	43	
8	Créteil	30	12	7	11	36	34	+2	43	
9	GOAL FC	30	11	8	11	38	46	−8	40 (Note: GOAL FC were deducted one point.)	
10	Pays de Grasse (D, R)	30	9	9	12	41	42	−1	36	Demoted to Régional
11	Fréjus Saint-Raphaël	30	9	8	13	37	50	−13	35	
12	Limonest	30	9	7	14	36	49	−13	34	
13	FC 93 (D, R)	30	7	11	12	29	31	−2	32	Demoted to Régional
14	Toulon	30	8	10	12	38	47	−9	31 (Note: Toulon were deducted three points.)	Spared from relegation
15	Saint-Priest	30	7	9	14	35	50	−15	30	Spared from relegation
16	Rousset (R)	30	2	6	22	28	76	−48	12	Relegation to National 2

Source: soccerway, fff
Rules for classification: 1) points; 2) head-to-head results; 3) head-to-head goal difference; 4) goal difference; 5) number of goals scored; 6) fair play points; 7) draw
(C) Champions; (D) Disqualified; (P) Promoted; (R) Relegated

=== Women ===
==== Première Ligue ====
===== Regular season =====
Pos	Team	Pld	W	D	L	GF	GA	GD	Pts	Qualification or relegation
1	Lyon (C)	22	19	3	0	76	11	+65	60	Qualification for the playoffs
2	Paris FC	22	15	3	4	46	16	+30	48	Qualification for the playoffs
3	Paris Saint-Germain	22	15	2	5	48	26	+22	47	Qualification for the playoffs
4	Nantes	22	12	5	5	42	34	+8	41	Qualification for the playoffs
5	Fleury	22	9	6	7	27	21	+6	33	
6	Dijon (D, R)	22	9	6	7	21	28	−7	33	Excluded from national competitions
7	Strasbourg	22	7	5	10	26	38	−12	26	
8	Le Havre	22	5	6	11	25	45	−20	21	
9	Marseille	22	5	4	13	26	44	−18	19	
10	Montpellier	22	4	3	15	28	45	−17	15	
11	Lens	22	4	3	15	20	50	−30	15	Repechage
12	Saint-Étienne (R)	22	3	4	15	11	38	−27	13	Relegation to the Seconde Ligue

Source: FFF.fr
Rules for classification: 1) points; 2) head-to-head points; 3) head-to-head goal difference; 4) goal difference; 5) goals scored
(C) Champions; (D) Disqualified; (R) Relegated

===== Play-offs =====
Semi-finals
1	Lyon	8
4	Nantes	0
2	Paris FC	1
3	Paris Saint-Germain	0

Final
Lyon	5
Paris FC	0

== Cup competitions ==
=== Men ===
==== 2025–26 Coupe de France ====
===== Final =====
22 May 2026
21:00 CEST

Lens	3–1	Nice
Thauvin 25'; Édouard 42'; Sima 78'	Report	Coulibaly 45+3'

Stade de France, Saint-Denis
Attendance: 24,672
Referee: Jérôme Brisard

==== 2025 Trophée des Champions ====
8 January 2026
21:00 AST

Paris Saint-Germain	2–2	Marseille
Dembélé 13'; Ramos 90+5'	Report	Greenwood 76' (pen.); Pacho 87' (o.g.)
Penalties
Ramos (penalty scored); Vitinha (penalty scored); Mendes (penalty scored); Doué (penalty scored)	4–1	(penalty missed) O'Riley; (penalty missed) Traorè; (penalty scored) Murillo

Jaber Al-Ahmad International Stadium, Kuwait City
Attendance: 52,215
Referee: Thomas Léonard

=== Women ===
==== 2025–26 Coupe de France Féminine ====
===== Final =====
10 May 2026
15:30

(1) OL Lyonnes	4–1	Paris Saint-Germain (1)
Dumornay 23'; Bècho 35', 40'; Heaps 74'	Report	Kanjinga 63'

Stade du Hainaut, Valenciennes
Attendance: 12,858
Referee: Elisa Daupeux

==== 2025–26 Coupe LFFP ====
===== Final =====
14 March 2026
18:30

OL Lyonnes	1–0	Paris Saint-Germain
Dumornay 59'	Report

Felix Houphouet Boigny Stadium, Abidjan, Ivory Coast
Attendance: 27,900
Referee: Émeline Rochebilière
