= 2025–26 Championnat National =

33rd season of third division league in France

Championnat National
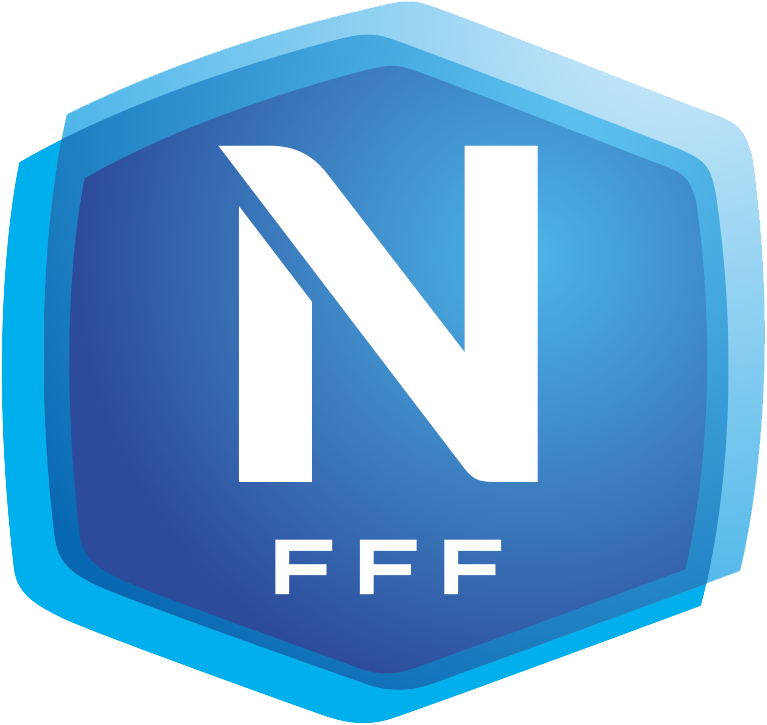
- Season: 2025–26
- Dates: 8 August 2025 – 15 May 2026
- Champions: Dijon
- Promoted: Dijon; Sochaux
- Relegated: Châteauroux; Stade Briochin

The 2025–26 Championnat National season was the 33rd since the establishment of the Championnat National and the 27th in its current format, which served as the third division of the French football league system.

This season was also the last to use the National name, with the league being renamed Ligue 3 starting in the 2026–27 season.

== Teams ==
=== Changes ===
The following teams changed division since the 2024–25 season.

To National
▼ Relegated from Ligue 2
- Ajaccio (Note: Originally ranked 12th in Ligue 2 the previous season but was relegated administratively due to financial problems.)
- Caen
▲ Promoted from National 2
- Le Puy
- Stade Briochin
- Fleury

From National
▲ Promoted to Ligue 2
- Nancy
- Le Mans
- Boulogne (Note: Promoted despite losing in the promotion play-offs in the previous season.)
▼ Relegated to National 2
- Nîmes

Administrative
▼ Demoted to Régional 2
- Ajaccio (Note: On 14 August 2025, due to continuing financial issues, Ajaccio were excluded from the competition.)
▼ Relegated to Départemental 3
- Martigues (Note: On 4 July 2025, the DNCG excluded Martigues from national competitions.)

=== Name changes ===
- Aubagne changed its official name to Aubagne Air Bel after the team merged with SC Air Bel and took effect this season.

=== Stadia and locations ===
Locations of teams in the 2025–26 Championnat National.
Locations of teams in the 2025–26 Championnat National from Île-de-France

Team	Location	Stadium	Capacity	2024–25 season
Ajaccio^{↓}	Ajaccio	Stade Michel Moretti	10,600	12th in Ligue 2
Aubagne Air Bel	Aubagne	Stade de Lattre-de-Tassigny	1,000	6th in National
Bourg-Péronnas	Bourg-en-Bresse	Stade Marcel-Verchère	11,400	5th in National
Caen^{↓}	Caen	Stade Michel d'Ornano	20,300	18th in Ligue 2
Châteauroux	Châteauroux	Stade Gaston-Petit	17,173	16th in National
Concarneau	Concarneau	Stade Guy-Piriou	5,800	8th in National
Dijon	Dijon	Stade Gaston Gérard	15,995	4th in National
Fleury^{↑}	Fleury-Mérogis	Stade Auguste Gentelet	2,000	1st in National 2 Group C
Le Puy^{↑}	Le Puy-en-Velay	Stade Charles Massot	4,800	1st in National 2 Group A
Orléans	Orléans	Stade de la Source	7,533	7th in National
Paris 13 Atletico	Paris 13	Stade Sébastien Charléty	20,000	14th in National
Quevilly-Rouen	Le Petit-Quevilly	Stade Robert Diochon	12,018	11th in National
Rouen	Rouen	Stade Robert Diochon	12,018	10th in National
Sochaux	Montbéliard	Stade Auguste-Bonal	20,005	12th in National
Stade Briochin^{↑}	Saint-Brieuc	Stade Fred-Aubert	10,600	1st in National 2 Group B
Valenciennes	Valenciennes	Stade du Hainaut	25,172	9th in National
Versailles	Versailles	Stade Georges Lefèvre	2,164	13th in National
Villefranche	Villefranche-sur-Saône	Stade Armand Chouffet	3,500	15th in National

^{↓}	Relegated from the Ligue 2
^{↑}	Promoted from the National 2

=== Personnel and kits ===
Note: Flags indicate national team as has been defined under FIFA eligibility rules. Players and coaches may hold more than one non-FIFA nationality.

Team	Manager	Captain	Kit manufacturer	Main kit sponsor	Other kit sponsor(s)
Ajaccio	(France national football team) Thierry Debès^{1}	(France national football team)	(Germany) Adidas		List: Front: None; Back: None; Sleeves: None; Shorts: None
Aubagne Air Bel	(Portugal national football team) Gabriel Santos	(France national football team)	(Germany) Adidas		List: Front: None; Back: None; Sleeves: None; Shorts: None
Bourg-Péronnas	(France national football team) David Le Frapper	(France national football team)	(Denmark) Hummel		List: Front: None; Back: None; Sleeves: None; Shorts: None
Caen	(France national football team) Maxime d'Ornano	(France national football team)	(United States) Nike		List: Front: None; Back: None; Sleeves: None; Shorts: None
Châteauroux	(Brazil national football team) Cris	(France national football team)	(Italy) Erreà		List: Front: None; Back: None; Sleeves: None; Shorts: None
Concarneau	(France national football team) Stéphane Rossi	(France national football team)	(Denmark) Hummel		List: Front: None; Back: None; Sleeves: None; Shorts: None
Dijon	(France national football team) Baptiste Ridira	(France national football team)	(United States) Nike		List: Front: None; Back: None; Sleeves: None; Shorts: None
Fleury	(France national football team) David Vignes	(France national football team)	(France) Skita		List: Front: None; Back: None; Sleeves: None; Shorts: None
Le Puy	(France national football team) Stéphane Dief	(France national football team)	(Germany) Adidas		List: Front: None; Back: None; Sleeves: None; Shorts: None
Orléans	(France national football team) Hervé Della Maggiore	(France national football team)	(Denmark) Hummel		List: Front: None; Back: None; Sleeves: None; Shorts: None
Paris 13 Atletico	Vacant	(France national football team)	(France) Skita		List: Front: None; Back: None; Sleeves: None; Shorts: None
Quevilly-Rouen	(France national football team) David Carré	(France national football team)	(Denmark) Hummel		List: Front: None; Back: None; Sleeves: None; Shorts: None
Rouen	(France national football team) Régis Brouard	(France national football team)	(France) XKript		List: Front: None; Back: None; Sleeves: None; Shorts: None
Sochaux	(France national football team) Vincent Hognon	(France national football team)	(France) Eldera		List: Front: None; Back: None; Sleeves: None; Shorts: None
Stade Briochin	(France national football team) Guillaume Allanou	(France national football team)	(Italy) Kappa		List: Front: None; Back: None; Sleeves: None; Shorts: None
Valenciennes	(France national football team) Stéphane Moulin	(France national football team)	(Denmark) Hummel		List: Front: None; Back: None; Sleeves: None; Shorts: None
Versailles	(France national football team) Jordan Gonzalez	(France national football team)	(Italy) Kappa		List: Front: None; Back: None; Sleeves: None; Shorts: None
Villefranche	(France national football team) Fabien Pujo	(France national football team)	(Germany) Adidas		List: Front: None; Back: None; Sleeves: None; Shorts: None

1. Interim.
2. Apparel made by club.
3. Applied on home shirt
4. Applied on away shirt
5. Applied on third shirt

=== Managerial changes ===
==== Pre-season ====
Team	Outgoing manager	Manner	Date of vacancy	Replaced by	Arrival date	
Team	Outgoing manager	Manner	Date of vacancy	Replaced by	Announced on	Arrival on
Caen	(Armenia) Michel Der Zakarian	End of contract	1 May 2025	(France) Maxime d'Ornano	12 May 2025	1 July 2025
Sochaux	(France) Frédéric Bompard	End of contract	7 May 2025	(France) Vincent Hognon	21 May 2025	1 July 2025
Valenciennes	(France) Vincent Hognon	End of contract	19 May 2025	(France) Stéphane Moulin	21 May 2025	1 July 2025

==== During the season ====
Team	Outgoing manager	Manner	Date of vacancy	Week	Position in table	Replaced by	Date of appointment

== Standings ==
=== League table ===
Pos	Team	Pld	W	D	L	GF	GA	GD	Pts	Promotion, qualification or relegation
1	Dijon (C, P)	32	18	11	3	52	25	+27	65	Promotion to Ligue 2
2	Sochaux (P)	32	16	10	6	51	26	+25	58	Promotion to Ligue 2
3	Rouen	32	14	13	5	43	29	+14	55	Qualification to promotion play-offs
4	Fleury	32	15	9	8	47	30	+17	54	Qualification to Ligue 3
5	Versailles	32	15	8	9	46	34	+12	53	Qualification to Ligue 3
6	Orléans	32	14	9	9	42	42	0	51	Qualification to Ligue 3
7	Le Puy	32	12	11	9	45	38	+7	47	Qualification to Ligue 3
8	Caen	32	8	16	8	39	34	+5	40	Qualification to Ligue 3
9	Concarneau	32	8	14	10	32	37	−5	38	Qualification to Ligue 3
10	Valenciennes	32	10	8	14	35	44	−9	37 (Note: Valenciennes were deducted 1 point due to the abandonment of their home game on 12 December against Sochaux.)	Qualification to Ligue 3
11	Aubagne Air Bel	32	9	10	13	38	46	−8	37	Qualification to Ligue 3
12	Villefranche	32	10	7	15	34	45	−11	37	Qualification to Ligue 3
13	Quevilly-Rouen	32	8	9	15	34	45	−11	33	Qualification to Ligue 3
14	Paris 13 Atletico	32	7	11	14	26	41	−15	32	Qualification to Ligue 3
15	Bourg-Péronnas	32	8	7	17	25	44	−19	31	Qualification to Ligue 3
16	Châteauroux (R)	32	6	13	13	35	49	−14	30 (Note: Châteauroux were deducted 1 point.)	Relegation to the National 1
17	Stade Briochin (R)	32	5	12	15	35	50	−15	27	Relegation to the National 1
18	Ajaccio (D, R)	0	0	0	0	0	0	0	0 (Note: Ajaccio were excluded from all French national competitions by the FFF on 14 August 2025 and their record was expunged.)	Excluded

Source: NATIONAL
Rules for classification: 1) head-to-head results; 2) head-to-head goal difference; 3) goal difference; 4) goals scored; 5) fair play points
(C) Champions; (D) Disqualified; (P) Promoted; (R) Relegated

=== Position by round ===
Team ╲ Round	1	2	3	4	5	6	7	8	9	10	11	12	13	14	15	16	17	18	19	20	21	22	23	24	25	26	27	28	29	30	31	32	33	34
Aubagne Air Bel																																		
Bourg-Péronnas																																		
Caen																																		
Châteauroux																																		
Concarneau																																		
Dijon																																		
Fleury																																		
Le Puy																																		
Orléans																																		
Paris 13 Atletico																																		
Quevilly-Rouen																																		
Rouen																																		
Sochaux																																		
Stade Briochin																																		
Valenciennes																																		
Versailles																																		
Villefranche																																		

Promotion to the Ligue 2
Qualification for the Promotion play-off
Relegation to the National

First match(es) will be played on 8 August 2025. Source: NATIONAL

== Results ==
=== Fixture and results ===
Home \ Away	AUB	BBP	CAE	CHA	CON	DIJ	FLE	LEP	ORL	P13	QUE	ROU	SOC	STB	VAL	VER	VIL
Aubagne Air Bel		1–0	3–1	1–1	1–1	1–1	1–2	1–4	0–2	1–1	0–1	1–1	1–4	1–2	1–1	1–1	3–1
Bourg-Péronnas	0–0		0–2	1–1	0–2	1–2	2–2	1–0	0–3	1–0	0–3	3–1	1–3	1–1	1–0	0–1	1–0
Caen	3–0	1–0		2–2	0–0	0–0	1–0	2–0	1–1	0–0	0–0	1–1	1–3	1–1	0–0	0–2	3–0
Châteauroux	0–3	2–2	2–1		3–1	0–0	0–2	0–2	0–1	0–1	3–5	1–2	2–1	2–2	0–0	1–3	0–1
Concarneau	1–0	0–1	3–3	0–0		1–1	0–1	0–3	3–0	0–0	3–1	0–0	1–0	2–2	1–2	0–2	2–2
Dijon	2–1	2–0	3–3	1–2	3–0		0–1	2–0	3–2	4–2	4–1	1–1	0–0	0–0	4–1	3–1	0–0
Fleury	0–2	3–0	1–2	0–0	0–4	3–1		4–0	3–0	1–0	2–1	1–2	0–0	4–1	2–0	0–0	2–2
Le Puy	1–2	1–1	1–0	2–2	1–1	1–2	2–1		1–1	1–1	2–1	0–3	0–1	1–1	3–0	2–2	3–0
Orléans	2–4	1–0	2–1	2–2	1–1	1–2	2–0	1–1		2–1	0–3	1–1	1–2	3–2	2–1	2–0	0–0
Paris 13 Atletico	1–1	2–1	0–3	1–1	0–0	1–4	1–0	0–1	2–2		1–0	0–0	1–3	3–0	1–1	1–3	1–0
Quevilly-Rouen	1–2	2–2	1–1	0–3	2–1	0–1	1–1	0–0	0–1	1–0		0–0	1–1	0–0	3–2	2–2	1–2
Rouen	3–1	1–0	1–1	1–2	0–0	0–0	0–0	1–1	1–0	3–0	1–0		3–1	3–2	1–2	1–3	2–1
Sochaux	2–0	2–1	1–1	1–0	2–0	0–1	2–2	2–2	5–0	1–1	2–0	1–1		2–0	1–1	2–0	2–1
Stade Briochin	1–3	1–2	1–1	2–0	1–2	0–0	2–3	1–2	1–3	0–1	3–0	0–1	1–1		2–1	0–1	0–0
Valenciennes	0–0	3–1	2–1	2–2	1–2	0–1	0–2	2–1	0–1	1–0	2–0	2–3	0–3	1–2		1–0	2–0
Versailles	3–0	1–0	2–1	4–0	4–0	0–2	1–1	0–3	0–0	2–1	1–2	1–3	1–0	2–2	1–1		2–1
Villefranche	2–1	0–1	1–1	2–1	0–0	1–2	0–3	2–3	1–2	3–1	2–1	2–1	1–0	3–1	2–3	1–0	

Source: NATIONAL
Legend: Blue = home team win; Yellow = draw; Red = away team win.
For upcoming matches, an "a" indicates there is an article about the rivalry between the two participants.

=== Results by round ===
Team ╲ Round	1	2	3	4	5	6	7	8	9	10	11	12	13	14	15	16	17	18	19	20	21	22	23	24	25	26	27	28	29	30	31	32	33	34
Aubagne Air Bel																																		
Bourg-Péronnas																																		
Caen																																		
Châteauroux																																		
Concarneau																																		
Dijon																																		
Fleury																																		
Le Puy																																		
Orléans																																		
Paris 13 Atletico																																		
Quevilly-Rouen																																		
Rouen																																		
Sochaux																																		
Stade Briochin																																		
Valenciennes																																		
Versailles																																		
Villefranche																																		

First match(es) will be played on 8 August 2025. Source: NATIONAL

== Attendances ==
=== Overall ===
Pos	Team	Total	High	Low	Average	Change
1	Ajaccio	0	0	0	0	n/a^{†}
2	Aubagne Air Bel	0	0	0	0	n/a
3	Bourg-Péronnas	0	0	0	0	n/a
4	Caen	0	0	0	0	n/a^{†}
5	Châteauroux	0	0	0	0	n/a
6	Concarneau	0	0	0	0	n/a
7	Dijon	0	0	0	0	n/a
8	Fleury	0	0	0	0	n/a^{‡}
9	Le Puy	0	0	0	0	n/a^{‡}
10	Orléans	0	0	0	0	n/a
11	Paris 13 Atletico	0	0	0	0	n/a
12	Quevilly-Rouen	0	0	0	0	n/a
13	Rouen	0	0	0	0	n/a
14	Sochaux	0	0	0	0	n/a
15	Stade Briochin	0	0	0	0	n/a^{‡}
16	Valenciennes	0	0	0	0	n/a
17	Versailles	0	0	0	0	n/a
18	Villefranche	0	0	0	0	n/a
	League total	0	0	0	0	n/a

Source: NATIONAL
Notes:
^{†} Teams played previous season in Ligue 2
^{‡} Teams played previous season in National 2

=== Home match played ===
As of future

Team \ Match played	1	2	3	4	5	6	7	8	9	10	11	12	13	14	15	16	17	Total
Ajaccio																		
Aubagne Air Bel																		
Bourg-Péronnas																		
Caen																		
Châteauroux																		
Concarneau																		
Dijon																		
Fleury																		
Le Puy																		
Orléans																		
Paris 13 Atletico																		
Quevilly-Rouen																		
Rouen																		
Sochaux																		
Stade Briochin																		
Valenciennes																		
Versailles																		
Villefranche																		
League total																		0

Source: NATIONAL

== See also ==
- 2025–26 Ligue 1
- 2025–26 Ligue 2
- 2025–26 Championnat National 2
- 2025–26 Championnat National 3
- 2025–26 Coupe de France
