= 2024–25 Championnat National 3 =

Championnat National 3
- Season: 2024–25
- Dates: 25 August 2024 – 26 May 2025
- Promoted: Bayonne; Chauray; Lorient (res); Borgo; Dieppe; Montlouis-sur-Loire; Saint-Maur; Colmar; Limonest; Rousset
- Relegated: 40 Teams

The 2024–25 Championnat National 3 was the eighth season of the fifth tier in the French football league system in its current format. For this season only, the competition was contested by 140 clubs split geographically across 10 groups of 14 teams. The teams included amateur clubs (although a few were semi-professional) and the reserve teams of professional clubs. The competition began on 25 August 2024 and ended on 26 May 2025.

== Teams ==
On 16 July 2024, the FFF ratified the constitution of the competition, and published the groups.

Changes from the 2023–24 season were as follows:

Teams joining the division

- Alès, Thonon Évian, Chamalières, Bourgoin-Jallieu, Toulouse (res), Saumur, Romorantin, Avoine Chinon, Trélissac, Angers (res), Racing Club, Lorient (res), Borgo, Vire, Guingamp (res), Haguenau, Colmar, Auxerre (res), Mâcon, Racing Besançon and Saint-Quentin finished in relegation positions in 2023–24 Championnat National 2
- 13 teams gained promotion from the various Régional 1 leagues.

Teams promoted to Championnat National 3
Region	Team	Method of qualification
Nouvelle-Aquitaine	Bassin d'Arcachon	Champion, R1 Group C
Pays de la Loire	La Roche-sur-Yon	Champion, R1 Group B
Centre-Val de Loire	Chartres	Champion, R1 Centre-Val de Loire
Corse	Sud FC	Champion, R1 Corse
Méditerranée	Saint-Jean-Cap-Ferrat	Champion, R1 Méditerranée
Bourgogne-Franche-Comté	Montceau-les-Mines	Champion, R1 Group A
Grand Est	Sarreguemines	Champion, R1 Group B
Occitanie	Aigues-Mortes	Champion, R1 Group A
Hauts-de-France	Calais	Champion, R1 Group C
Normandy	Grand-Quevilly	Champion, R1 Group B
Brittany	Cesson-Sévigné	Champion, R1 Group B
Paris Île-de-France	Torcy	Champion, R1 Group B
Auvergne-Rhône-Alpes	Seyssinet-Pariset	Champion, R1 Group C

Teams leaving the division

- Istres, Anglet, Poitiers, Poiré-sur-Vie, Saint-Colomban Locminé, Houlgate, Chantilly, FC Balagne, Thionville, Rumilly-Vallières and Saint-Priest were champions of each group, and were promoted to 2023–24 Championnat National 2.
- Cagnes-sur-Mer, Montferrier-sur-Lez, Saint-Paul-lès-Dax, Saint-Estève, Tours (administrative relegation then dissolution), Bourges Foot 18 (res), Chambray, Niort (res), Saint-Nazaire, Les Sables-d'Olonne, Château-Gontier, Stade Briochin (res), Stade Pontivyen, Cercle Paul Bert Bréquigny, Le Havre (res), Quevilly-Rouen (res), Les Mureaux, Marcq-en-Barœul, Compiègne, Saint-Amand-les-Eaux, Montrouge (administrative relegation), Vitry-sur-Seine, Saran, Mainvilliers, Reims Sainte-Anne (administrative relegation), Nancy (res), FC Métropole Troyenne, Vesoul, Is-Selongey, La Chapelle-de-Guinchay, Feurs (administrative relegation), Valence, Ain Sud, Vaulx-en-Velin were relegated to Régional 1 for the 2024–25 season.

Fusion

- Prix-lès-Mézières merged with Charleville and became Charleville Prix-lès-Mézières.

== Promotion and relegation ==
If eligible, the top team in each group is promoted to Championnat National 2. If a team finishing top of the group is ineligible, or declines promotion, the next eligible team in that group is promoted.

This season a total of 40 teams will be relegated to Régional 1, as a result of the restructuring of the French leagues. This will result in teams finishing in the bottom three places being relegated, along with the four worst eleventh-placed clubs, calculated from results against the teams placed 5th to 10th in their group. Initially, it was planned the worst tenth was to be relegated, but the administrative relegation of FC Girondins de Bordeaux changed that.

Reserve teams whose training centres are categorised as category 2B or lower cannot be promoted to Championnat National 2 by the rules of the competition.

== League tables ==
=== Group A ===
Pos	Team	Pld	W	D	L	GF	GA	GD	Pts	Promotion or relegation
1	Bayonne (C, P)	26	16	8	2	49	17	+32	56	Promotion to National 2
2	Colomiers	26	11	6	9	41	34	+7	39	
3	Bassin d'Arcachon	26	11	6	9	42	39	+3	39	
4	Toulouse (res)	26	10	7	9	34	29	+5	37	
5	Alberes Argelès	26	8	12	6	36	34	+2	36	
6	Castanet	26	8	12	6	28	34	−6	36	
7	Pau (res)	26	10	6	10	34	36	−2	35 (Note: Pau (res) was deducted 1 point.)	
8	Blagnac	26	7	13	6	25	19	+6	34	
9	Onet-le-Château	26	8	9	9	40	56	−16	33	
10	Canet Roussillon	26	9	6	11	29	31	−2	33	
11	Lège Cap Ferret	26	7	11	8	33	35	−2	32	
12	Trélissac (R)	26	7	7	12	34	44	−10	28	Relegation to Régional 1
13	Bordeaux (res) (R)	26	6	8	12	35	44	−9	25 (Note: Bordeaux (res) was deducted 1 point.)	Relegation to Régional 1
14	Stade Bordelais (R)	26	5	7	14	25	33	−8	22	Relegation to Régional 1

Updated to match(es) played on 17 May 2025. Source: fff
Rules for classification: 1) points; 2) head-to-head results; 3) head-to-head goal difference; 4) goal difference; 5) number of goals scored; 6) fair play points; 7) draw
(C) Champions; (P) Promoted; (R) Relegated

=== Group B ===
Pos	Team	Pld	W	D	L	GF	GA	GD	Pts	Promotion or relegation
1	Chauray (C, P)	26	12	7	7	30	24	+6	43	Promotion to National 2
2	Nantes (res)	26	11	8	7	40	26	+14	41	
3	La Châtaigneraie	26	12	4	10	24	33	−9	40	
4	Vitré	26	11	6	9	43	36	+7	39	
5	Angers (res)	26	10	6	10	38	33	+5	36	
6	Fontenay	26	8	11	7	40	31	+9	35	
7	Vertou	26	9	7	10	30	36	−6	34	
8	Panazol	26	9	7	10	34	33	+1	34	
9	Challans	26	7	12	7	32	26	+6	33	
10	Saint-Philbert-de-Grand-Lieu	26	8	9	9	35	36	−1	33	
11	Laval (res)	26	7	12	7	32	33	−1	32 (Note: Laval (res) was deducted 1 point.)	
12	ESOF La Roche-sur-Yon (R)	26	7	10	9	26	36	−10	31	Relegation to Régional 1
13	TA Rennes (R)	26	8	6	12	27	37	−10	30	Relegation to Régional 1
14	Sablé (R)	26	7	7	12	29	40	−11	27 (Note: Sablé was deducted 1 point.)	Relegation to Régional 1

Updated to match(es) played on 17 May 2025. Source: fff
Rules for classification: 1) points; 2) head-to-head results; 3) head-to-head goal difference; 4) goal difference; 5) number of goals scored; 6) fair play points; 7) draw
(C) Champions; (P) Promoted; (R) Relegated

=== Group C ===
Pos	Team	Pld	W	D	L	GF	GA	GD	Pts	Promotion or relegation
1	Lorient (res) (C, P)	26	16	4	6	50	30	+20	52	Promotion to National 2
2	Guingamp (res)	26	14	7	5	42	23	+19	49	
3	Vire	26	14	6	6	49	34	+15	48	
4	Rennes (res)	26	13	6	7	41	28	+13	44 (Note: Rennes (res) was deducted 1 point.)	
5	Milizac	26	11	10	5	43	31	+12	43	
6	Cesson-Sévigné	26	10	7	9	33	30	+3	37	
7	Fougères	26	9	7	10	37	48	−11	34	
8	Vannes	26	10	3	13	30	34	−4	32 (Note: Vannes was deducted 1 point.)	
9	Pontivy	26	9	5	12	39	37	+2	32	
10	Ergué-Gabéric	26	9	4	13	36	48	−12	31	
11	Lannion	26	7	9	10	30	38	−8	30	
12	Flers (R)	26	7	8	11	31	38	−7	29	Relegation to Régional 1
13	Plabennec (R)	26	5	6	15	20	42	−22	21	Relegation to Régional 1
14	Saint-Lô (R)	26	4	6	16	38	58	−20	18	Relegation to Régional 1

Updated to match(es) played on 17 May 2025. Source: fff
Rules for classification: 1) points; 2) head-to-head results; 3) head-to-head goal difference; 4) goal difference; 5) number of goals scored; 6) fair play points; 7) draw
(C) Champions; (P) Promoted; (R) Relegated

=== Group D ===
Pos	Team	Pld	W	D	L	GF	GA	GD	Pts	Promotion or relegation
1	Borgo (C, P)	26	16	7	3	45	23	+22	55	Promotion to National 2
2	Oissel	26	13	8	5	45	28	+17	47	
3	Brétigny	26	13	5	8	37	24	+13	44	
4	AC Ajaccio (res) (R)	26	11	9	6	41	33	+8	42 (Note: AC Ajaccio's main team was excluded from national competitions, and will play in Régional 2 in 2025–26.)	Exclusion of the club from national competitions
5	Linas-Montlhéry	26	12	6	8	37	38	−1	42	
6	Saint-Ouen-l'Aumône	26	11	8	7	45	25	+20	41	
7	SM Caen (res)	26	11	5	10	48	41	+7	38	
8	SC Bastia (res)	26	11	4	11	37	34	+3	37	
9	Alençon	26	11	4	11	44	44	0	37	
10	Dives-Cabourg	26	9	7	10	36	38	−2	34	
11	ASPTT Caen (R)	26	9	5	12	35	40	−5	32	Relegation to Régional 1
12	Chatou (R)	26	7	7	12	37	37	0	27 (Note: Chatou was deducted 1 point.)	Relegation to Régional 1
13	Grand-Quevilly (R)	26	4	6	16	25	62	−37	18	Relegation to Régional 1
14	AG Caen (R)	26	3	1	22	26	71	−45	7 (Note: AG Caen was deducted 3 points.)	Relegation to Régional 1

Updated to match(es) played on 17 May 2025. Source: fff
Rules for classification: 1) points; 2) head-to-head results; 3) head-to-head goal difference; 4) goal difference; 5) number of goals scored; 6) fair play points; 7) draw
(C) Champions; (P) Promoted; (R) Relegated

=== Group E ===
Pos	Team	Pld	W	D	L	GF	GA	GD	Pts	Promotion or relegation
1	Dieppe (C, P)	26	17	6	3	60	27	+33	57	Promotion to National 2
2	Lille (res)	26	13	6	7	47	30	+17	45	
3	Reims (res)	26	11	6	9	49	39	+10	39	
4	Charleville Prix-lès-Mézières	26	9	8	9	37	38	−1	35	
5	Pays du Valois	26	9	8	9	36	44	−8	35	
6	Vimy	26	8	10	8	43	45	−2	34	
7	Drancy	26	9	7	10	37	41	−4	34	
8	Croix	26	8	10	8	36	36	0	34	
9	Pays de Cassel	26	8	9	9	38	48	−10	33	
10	Saint-Quentin	26	8	9	9	45	46	−1	33	
11	Lens (res) (R)	26	10	4	12	42	39	+3	33 (Note: Lens (res) was deducted 1 point.)	Relegation to Régional 1
12	Sannois-Saint-Gratien (R)	26	7	11	8	30	36	−6	32	Relegation to Régional 1
13	Calais (R)	26	6	8	12	29	44	−15	26	Relegation to Régional 1
14	Valenciennes (res) (R)	26	2	12	12	27	43	−16	18	Relegation to Régional 1

Updated to match(es) played on 17 May 2025. Source: fff
Rules for classification: 1) points; 2) head-to-head results; 3) head-to-head goal difference; 4) goal difference; 5) number of goals scored; 6) fair play points; 7) draw
(C) Champions; (P) Promoted; (R) Relegated

=== Group F ===
Pos	Team	Pld	W	D	L	GF	GA	GD	Pts	Promotion or relegation
1	Montlouis-sur-Loire (C, P)	26	18	3	5	36	20	+16	57	Promotion to National 2
2	Chartres	26	16	6	4	43	24	+19	54	
3	Cosne-sur-Loire	26	13	5	8	44	40	+4	44	
4	Orléans (res)	26	13	4	9	53	43	+10	43	
5	Romorantin	26	13	3	10	58	45	+13	42	
6	Châtellerault	26	10	4	12	39	39	0	34	
7	Ouest Tourangeau	26	9	7	10	38	36	+2	34	
8	Vierzon	26	11	8	7	54	41	+13	34 (Note: Vierzon was deducted 7 points.)	
9	Chauvigny	26	8	9	9	33	40	−7	33	
10	Châteauroux (res)	26	9	4	13	27	33	−6	31	
11	Avoine Chinon (R)	26	5	12	9	25	29	−4	27	Relegation to Régional 1
12	Moulon Bourges (R)	26	8	3	15	36	42	−6	27	Relegation to Régional 1
13	Châteauneuf-sur-Loire (R)	26	7	4	15	32	54	−22	25	Relegation to Régional 1
14	Vineuil (R)	26	5	2	19	18	50	−32	17	Relegation to Régional 1

Updated to match(es) played on 17 May 2025. Source: fff
Rules for classification: 1) points; 2) head-to-head results; 3) head-to-head goal difference; 4) goal difference; 5) number of goals scored; 6) fair play points; 7) draw
(C) Champions; (P) Promoted; (R) Relegated

=== Group G ===
Pos	Team	Pld	W	D	L	GF	GA	GD	Pts	Promotion or relegation
1	Saint-Maur (C, P)	26	16	8	2	47	21	+26	56	Promotion to National 2
2	Racing Club	26	15	8	3	57	22	+35	53	
3	Auxerre (res)	26	12	7	7	40	26	+14	43	
4	ESTAC Troyes (res)	26	12	6	8	49	30	+19	42	
5	Sainte-Geneviève	26	10	9	7	33	28	+5	39	
6	Torcy	26	10	6	10	35	43	−8	36	
7	Neuilly-sur-Marne	26	10	8	8	39	37	+2	38	
8	Dijon (res)	26	9	6	11	36	36	0	33	
9	Moulins Yzeure	26	9	6	11	35	43	−8	33	
10	Ivry	26	8	8	10	36	37	−1	32	
11	Montceau-les-Mines (R)	26	8	5	13	22	40	−18	29	Relegation to Régional 1
12	ASPTT Dijon	26	7	9	10	33	40	−7	27 (Note: ASPTT Dijon, initially 6th with 38 points, is handed 3-0 losses on the 12 June 2025 (at home against Torcy and Neuilly-sur-Marne, away against Montceau-les-Mines) along with a 3-point deduction. Indeed, Didier Slimane, a New Caledonian player, played in all three of these matches, and it was found the player had been transferred without an international certificate. The club then fell to 12th place, which should've meant being relegated. However, the club will be reintegrated in the 2025–26 Championnat National 3, by decision from the French Football Federation, following an appeal to the French National Olympic and Sports Committee. The team will replace Ajaccio's reserve team following the Corsican club's exclusion from national competitions.)	Administrative reintegration to National 3
13	Louhans-Cuiseaux (R)	26	3	7	16	20	55	−35	16	Relegation to Régional 1
14	Gueugnon (R)	26	3	7	16	19	43	−24	16	Relegation to Régional 1

Updated to match(es) played on 17 May 2025. Source: fff
Rules for classification: 1) points; 2) head-to-head results; 3) head-to-head goal difference; 4) goal difference; 5) number of goals scored; 6) fair play points; 7) draw
(C) Champions; (P) Promoted; (R) Relegated

=== Group H ===
Pos	Team	Pld	W	D	L	GF	GA	GD	Pts	Promotion or relegation
1	Colmar (C, P)	26	15	4	7	54	27	+27	49	Promotion to National 2
2	Racing Besançon	26	14	6	6	39	26	+13	48	
3	Sochaux (res)	26	13	6	7	41	30	+11	45	
4	Pontarlier	26	11	7	8	35	35	0	40	
5	Metz (res)	26	11	6	9	46	34	+12	39	
6	RC Strasbourg (res)	26	11	4	11	47	52	−5	37	
7	Jura Dolois	26	10	7	9	33	29	+4	36 (Note: Jura Dolois was deducted 1 point.)	
8	Belfort	26	9	7	10	39	41	−2	34	
9	Thaon	26	7	11	8	36	40	−4	32	
10	Besançon Football	26	8	7	11	33	42	−9	31	
11	Sarreguemines (R)	26	9	4	13	41	59	−18	31	Relegation to Régional 1
12	Sarre-Union (R)	26	7	9	10	28	29	−1	30	Relegation to Régional 1
13	Raon-l'Étape (R)	26	6	7	13	41	50	−9	25	Relegation to Régional 1
14	Strasbourg Koenigshoffen (R)	26	5	7	14	29	48	−19	22	Relegation to Régional 1

Updated to match(es) played on 17 May 2025. Source: fff
Rules for classification: 1) points; 2) head-to-head results; 3) head-to-head goal difference; 4) goal difference; 5) number of goals scored; 6) fair play points; 7) draw
(C) Champions; (P) Promoted; (R) Relegated

=== Group I ===
Pos	Team	Pld	W	D	L	GF	GA	GD	Pts	Promotion or relegation
1	Limonest (C, P)	26	15	5	6	37	25	+12	50	Promotion to National 2
2	Lyon La Duchère	26	14	5	7	39	29	+10	47	
3	Bourgoin-Jallieu	26	11	7	8	42	32	+10	40	
4	Mâcon	26	13	1	12	34	35	−1	40	
5	Olympique Lyonnais (res)	26	12	4	10	43	30	+13	40	
6	Thonon Évian	26	12	4	10	39	36	+3	40	
7	Chamalières	26	10	6	10	28	29	−1	36	
8	Saint-Étienne (res)	26	9	8	9	33	35	−2	35	
9	Seyssinet-Pariset	26	9	6	11	33	42	−9	33	
10	Hauts Lyonnais	26	7	10	9	29	29	0	31	
11	Chassieu (R)	26	7	8	11	35	40	−5	29	Relegation to Régional 1
12	Clermont (res) (R)	26	8	6	12	36	48	−12	29 (Note: Clermont Foot was deducted 1 point.)	Relegation to Régional 1
13	Espaly-Saint-Marcel (R)	26	5	11	10	26	32	−6	26	Relegation to Régional 1
14	Chambéry (R)	26	6	7	13	27	39	−12	25	Relegation to Régional 1

Updated to match(es) played on 17 May 2025. Source: fff
Rules for classification: 1) points; 2) head-to-head results; 3) head-to-head goal difference; 4) goal difference; 5) number of goals scored; 6) fair play points; 7) draw
(C) Champions; (P) Promoted; (R) Relegated

=== Group J ===
Pos	Team	Pld	W	D	L	GF	GA	GD	Pts	Promotion or relegation
1	Rousset (C, P)	26	19	3	4	66	36	+30	60	Promotion to National 2
2	Alès	26	16	2	8	67	41	+26	50	
3	Agde	26	14	3	9	41	35	+6	45	
4	Marseille (res)	26	12	7	7	51	30	+21	42 (Note: Olympique de Marseille was deducted 1 point)	
5	Fos-sur-Mer	26	11	7	8	42	40	+2	40	
6	Saint-Jean-Cap-Ferrat	26	11	5	10	36	38	−2	38	
7	Lucciana	26	9	8	9	41	49	−8	35	
8	Beaucaire	26	10	5	11	39	38	+1	35	
9	Cannet Rocheville	26	8	10	8	31	28	+3	31 (Note: Cannet Rocheville was deducted 3 points.)	
10	Montpellier (res)	26	8	6	12	38	42	−4	30	
11	Sud FC (R)	26	6	8	12	25	37	−12	26	Relegation to Régional 1
12	Aigues-Mortes (R)	26	6	7	13	31	44	−13	25	Relegation to Régional 1
13	Corte (R)	26	6	6	14	31	52	−21	24	Relegation to Régional 1
14	EUGA Ardziv (R)	26	6	3	17	42	71	−29	21	Relegation to Régional 1

Updated to match(es) played on 12 May 2025. Source: fff
Rules for classification: 1) points; 2) head-to-head results; 3) head-to-head goal difference; 4) goal difference; 5) number of goals scored; 6) fair play points; 7) draw
(C) Champions; (P) Promoted; (R) Relegated

== Season outcomes ==
=== Promotion ===
Bayonne, Chauray, Lorient (res), Borgo, Dieppe, Montlouis-sur-Loire, Saint-Maur, Colmar, Limonest and Rousset were champions of each group, and were promoted to 2025–26 Championnat National 2.

=== Relegation ===
A total of 36 teams were relegated:

- Group A

Trélissac, Stade Bordelais, Bordeaux (res)

- Group B

ESOF La Roche-sur-Yon, TA Rennes, Sablé

- Group C

Flers, Plabennec, Saint-Lô

- Group D

AC Ajaccio (res) (administrative relegation), ASPTT Caen, Chatou, Grand-Quevilly, AG Caen

- Group E

Lens (res), Sannois-Saint-Gratien, Calais, Valenciennes (res)

- Group F

Avoine Chinon, Moulon Bourges, Châteauneuf-sur-Loire, Vineuil

- Group G

Montceau-les-Mines, Louhans-Cuiseaux, Gueugnon

- Group H

Sarreguemines, Sarre-Union, Raon-l'Étape, Strasbourg Koenigshoffen

- Group I

Chassieu, Clermont (res), Espaly-Saint-Marcel, Chambéry

- Group J

Sud FC, Aigues-Mortes, Corte, EUGA Ardziv
