= 2026–27 Ligue 3 =

Ligue 3
- Season: 2026–27
- Dates: August 2026 – May 2027

The 2026-27 Ligue 3 will be the first season to have the official name Ligue 3 (Ligue 3 Betclic for sponsorship reasons from 2026 onwards), as it was previously named Championnat National. It is the 34th season since it was established, and serves the third division of the French football league system.

== Teams ==
Ligue 3 will feature 18 clubs competing across a traditional 34-game home-and-away season. La Roche and Cannes were promoted to Ligue 3 after thirteen and twelve respective years of absence. Thionville enters the league for the first time. Bastia and Amiens, however, were relegated to Ligue 3 after five and six years in Ligue 2, respectively. The top two sides will earn automatic promotion to Ligue 2, while teams finishing between third and sixth will contest promotion play-offs. The winner of those play-offs will then face the 16th-placed Ligue 2 side in a two-legged relegation/promotion play-off. At the other end of the table, the bottom three clubs will be relegated.

=== Changes ===
The following teams changed division since the 2025–26 season.

To Ligue 3
▼ Relegated from Ligue 2
- Bastia
- Amiens
▲ Promoted from National 2
- La Roche
- Thionville
- Cannes

From National
▲ Promoted to Ligue 2
- Dijon
- Sochaux
▼ Relegated to National 1
- Châteauroux
- Stade Briochin

=== Stadiums and locations ===
Locations of teams in the 2026–27 Ligue 3.
Locations of teams in the 2026–27 Ligue 3 from Île-de-France

Team	Location	Stadium	Capacity
Amiens^{↓}	Amiens	Stade de la Licorne	12,097
Aubagne Air Bel	Aubagne	Stade de Lattre-de-Tassigny	1,000
Bastia^{↓}	Bastia	Stade Armand-Cesari	16,048
Bourg-Péronnas	Bourg-en-Bresse	Stade Marcel-Verchère	11,400
Caen	Caen	Stade Michel d'Ornano	21,215
Cannes^{↑}	Cannes	Stade Pierre de Coubertin	9,819
Concarneau	Concarneau	Stade Guy-Piriou	5,800
Fleury	Fleury-Mérogis	Stade Auguste Gentelet	2,000
La Roche^{↑}	La Roche-sur-Yon	Stade Henri Desgranges	10,000
Le Puy	Le Puy-en-Velay	Stade Charles Massot	4,800
Orléans	Orléans	Stade de la Source	7,000
Paris 13 Atletico	Paris (Paris 13)	Stade Sébastien Charléty	20,000
Quevilly-Rouen	Le Petit-Quevilly	Stade Robert Diochon	8,372
Rouen	Le Petit-Quevilly	Stade Robert Diochon	8,372
Thionville^{↑}	Thionville	Stade de la Plaine	1,000
Valenciennes	Valenciennes	Stade du Hainaut	25,172
Versailles	Versailles	Stade de Montbauron	7,545
Villefranche	Villefranche-sur-Saône	Stade Armand Chouffet	3,500

^{↓}	Relegated from the Ligue 2
^{↑}	Promoted from the National 2

=== Managerial changes ===
Team	Outgoing manager	Manner of departure	Date of vacancy	Position in table	Incoming manager	Date of appointment
Bastia	(France) Réginald Ray	Mutual consent	12 May 2026	Pre-season	(France) Laurent Peyrelade	6 June 2026
Concarneau	(France) Stéphane Rossi	Sacked	28 May 2026	Pre-season	(France) Stéphane Moulin	13 June 2026
Quevilly-Rouen	(France) Fabien Valeri	End of contract	2 June 2026	Pre-season	(Portugal) Gabriel Santos	22 June 2026
Bourg-Péronnas	(France) David Le Frapper	Sacked	6 June 2026	Pre-season	(France) Nicolas Rabuel	10 June 2026
Fleury	(France) David Vignes	Signed by Laval	12 June 2026	Pre-season	(France) Maxime D'Ornano	16 June 2026
Paris 13 Atletico	(France) Emmanuel Da Costa	End of contract	30 June 2026	Pre-season	(France) Stéphane Rossi	1 July 2026
Villefranche	(France) Fabien Pujo	Sacked	21 September 2026	18th	(France) Mathias Laforest (interim)	21 September 2026
Villefranche	(France) Mathias Laforest	End of interim spell	4 October 2026	12th	(France) Hakim Malek	4 October 2026

== Standings ==
=== League table ===
Pos	Team	Pld	W	D	L	GF	GA	GD	Pts	Promotion or Relegation
1	La Roche	13	9	3	1	21	11	+10	30	Promotion to Ligue 2
2	Rouen	13	8	2	3	22	10	+12	26	Promotion to Ligue 2
3	Versailles	13	8	1	4	22	14	+8	25	Qualification for promotion play-off quarter-final
4	Amiens	13	6	5	2	18	6	+12	23	Qualification for promotion play-off quarter-final
5	Caen	13	7	1	5	23	17	+6	22	Qualification for promotion play-off quarter-final
6	Concarneau	13	5	5	3	17	13	+4	20	Qualification for promotion play-off quarter-final
7	Cannes	13	4	7	2	14	8	+6	19	
8	Quevilly-Rouen	13	5	4	4	15	16	−1	19	
9	Fleury	13	5	4	4	18	15	+3	19	
10	Le Puy	13	5	4	4	15	12	+3	19	
11	Bastia	13	5	3	5	14	16	−2	18	
12	Paris 13 Atletico	13	4	5	4	11	12	−1	17	
13	Thionville	12	4	4	4	17	17	0	16	
14	Orléans	12	2	5	5	12	17	−5	11	
15	Valenciennes	13	2	4	7	13	21	−8	10	
16	Aubagne Air Bel	13	2	2	9	6	19	−13	8	Relegation to National 1
17	Villefranche	13	2	2	9	12	30	−18	8	Relegation to National 1
18	Bourg-Péronnas	13	1	3	9	6	22	−16	6	Relegation to National 1

Updated to match(es) played on 21 November 2026. Source: Ligue 3 2026–27
Rules for classification: 1) head-to-head results; 2) head-to-head goal difference; 3) goal difference; 4) goals scored; 5) fair play points

== Results ==
=== Fixture and results ===
Home \ Away	AMI	AUB	BAS	BBP	CAE	CNS	CON	FLE	LAR	LEP	ORL	P13	QRM	ROU	THI	VAL	VER	VIL
Amiens	—				2–1				0–1		2–0				1–1		3–0	3–0
Aubagne Air Bel	0–2	—	0–1	2–0			1–2			0–1					0–3			
Bastia	0–3		—			1–1				0–2	1–1		2–0				2–3	4–2
Bourg-Péronnas			0–1	—	0–2		1–1	0–1		1–1					0–2			3–2
Caen		1–0	0–1		—				2–1			2–0		3–2		4–0	1–0	
Cannes	0–0	0–0				—		1–1		2–0			3–1			2–1		
Concarneau			1–1		2–0		—	2–0			0–2	2–1			2–2			2–0
Fleury	0–0	1–2			3–2			—			0–2	1–1		1–0	1–1			6–1
La Roche		3–1		2–0		1–1	2–1		—				1–1			3–2	3–2	
Le Puy	1–0				2–2					—	1–1	0–0			1–0			4–1
Orléans						0–0			0–1		—			1–2			0–4	1–1
Paris 13 Atletico		0–0	1–0	1–1					0–1			—	1–0	3–1		2–1		
Quevilly-Rouen	1–1						1–1	2–1		2–1	3–2		—			2–0		
Rouen		1–0	2–0	2–0		0–0	2–1						3–0	—		1–1		
Thionville					4–3	1–0			1–2			1–1		0–4	—		1–2	
Valenciennes	1–1			2–0			0–0	1–2		2–1	2–2					—		
Versailles		4–0		3–0		0–3				1–0			0–0			1–0	—	
Villefranche						2–1			0–0			2–0	0–2	0–2			1–2	—

Updated to match(es) played on 21 November 2026. Source: Ligue 3
Legend: Blue = home team win; Yellow = draw; Red = away team win.
For upcoming matches, an "a" indicates there is an article about the rivalry between the two participants.

== See also ==
- 2026–27 Ligue 1
- 2026–27 Ligue 2
- 2026–27 National 1
- 2026–27 Coupe de France
