= Fabien Valéri =

French footballer and manager (born 1974)

Personal information
- Date of birth: 9 June 1974 (age 52)
- Place of birth: Noisy-le-Sec, France
- Height: 1.82 m (6 ft 0 in)
- Position: Midfielder

Team information
- Current team: Saint-Maur (manager)

Senior career*
Years	Team	Apps	(Gls)
1992–2000	Red Star	172	(10)
2000–2002	Naval 1º de Maio	65	(11)
2002–2003	Académica de Coimbra	4	(0)
2003–2004	Cannes		
2004–2005	Choisy-le-Roi		
2005–2007	Paris FC	34	(0)
2007–2008	Istres	31	(0)
2008–2009	Paris FC	32	(1)
2010	Viry-Châtillon	13	(0)

Managerial career
- 2013–2016: Maccabi Paris
- 2016: Paris FC (assistant)
- 2019–2020: Paris FC II
- 2020–2022: Paris 13 Atletico
- 2022–2023: Chambly
- 2023: Virton
- 2024–2025: Paris 13 Atletico
- 2025–2026: Quevilly-Rouen
- 2026–: Saint-Maur
- * Club domestic league appearances and goals

Fabien Valéri (born 9 June 1974) is a French professional football manager and former player who is the manager of Championnat National 1 club Saint-Maur.

== Honours ==
=== Player ===
Paris FC

- Championnat de France Amateur: 2005–06

=== Manager ===
Paris 13 Atletico

- Championnat National 2: 2021–22
