= 2025–26 Championnat National 2 =

Championnat National 2
- Season: 2025–26
- Dates: August 2025 – May 2026
- All statistics correct as of 26 April 2026.

The 2025–26 Championnat National 2 was the 28th season of the fourth tier in the French football league system in its current format. This season consisted of three groups split geographically containing a total of 48 clubs, with 16 in each group. A total of 10 clubs were promoted from the Championnat National 3 and one was relegated from the Championnat National, the tier above. Promoted teams from the Championnat National 2 gained a place in the new Ligue 3, the third tier of French football. Relegated teams were moved to the renamed Championnat National 2, the fifth tier. One team was promoted from each of the three groups, while two or three were relegated.

== Administrative decisions ==
=== Name change ===
- La Roche VF became VFC La Roche-sur-Yon.
- Wasquehal Football became Wasquehal Football Club.

=== Relegations ===
On 20 May 2025, the National Directorate of Management Control (DNCG) sanctioned Bergerac with exclusion from national championships. On 1 July 2025, the club announced it would not appeal and accepted its relegation to the regional level, later taking a demotion to Régional 3

Also on 20 May 2025, Marignane GCB was relegated one division to the National 3, a decision which was upheld on appeal on 1 July 2025, before the club was ultimately relegated two tiers down to Régional 1 on 16 July 2025 by the DNCG.

On 27 May 2025, Beauvais and Balagne were sanctioned with relegation to the National 3. On appeal, the sanction against Balagne was upheld, while the sanction against Beauvais was overturned. On 11 June 2025, Stade Poitevin was also relegated to the National 3 but was ultimately reinstated on appeal on 3 July 2025. In addition, Bourg-Péronnas was administratively relegated to the Championnat National 2 from the Championnat National on 11 June 2025 but the decision was ultimately reversed on appeal on 3 July 2025, while Nîmes—who were initially relegated to the Championnat National 2—were excluded from national competitions on 24 June 2025 but was ultimately reinstated to the National 2 on appeal on 15 July 2025. On 4 July 2025, Martigues—having been relegated to the Championnat National—was barred from national competitions by the DNCG, a decision upheld on appeal on 15 July 2025. This resulted in Châteauroux being reinstated in the Championnat National, having initially been relegated to the National 2.

== Teams ==
Location of teams in 2025–26 National 2

== League tables ==
=== Group A ===
| Pos | Team | Pld | W | D | L | GF | GA | GD | Pts | Promotion or relegation |
|---|---|---|---|---|---|---|---|---|---|---|
| 1 | La Roche (C, P) | 30 | 19 | 8 | 3 | 61 | 27 | +34 | 65 | Promotion to Ligue 3 |
| 2 | Bordeaux (Note: Bordeaux were excluded from the national championships due to financial mismanagement.) (D, R) | 30 | 19 | 5 | 6 | 51 | 28 | +23 | 62 | Demoted to Régional |
| 3 | Bayonne | 30 | 17 | 4 | 9 | 42 | 27 | +15 | 55 | |
| 4 | Saint-Malo | 30 | 13 | 11 | 6 | 43 | 29 | +14 | 50 | |
| 5 | Les Herbiers | 30 | 14 | 7 | 9 | 45 | 33 | +12 | 49 | |
| 6 | Angoulême | 30 | 11 | 10 | 9 | 33 | 36 | −3 | 43 | |
| 7 | Dinan Léhon | 30 | 12 | 5 | 13 | 44 | 45 | −1 | 41 | |
| 8 | Avranches | 30 | 10 | 10 | 10 | 46 | 41 | +5 | 40 | |
| 9 | Chauray | 30 | 11 | 5 | 14 | 35 | 38 | −3 | 38 | |
| 10 | Saint-Colomban Locminé | 30 | 9 | 10 | 11 | 31 | 34 | −3 | 37 | |
| 11 | Montlouis | 30 | 7 | 10 | 13 | 42 | 50 | −8 | 31 | |
| 12 | Lorient (res) | 30 | 9 | 5 | 16 | 38 | 51 | −13 | 31 (Note: Lorient (res) were deducted one point.) | |
| 13 | Châteaubriant | 30 | 8 | 6 | 16 | 25 | 47 | −22 | 30 | |
| 14 | Granville | 30 | 6 | 11 | 13 | 32 | 41 | −9 | 29 | Spared from relegation |
| 15 | Saumur | 30 | 6 | 10 | 14 | 37 | 56 | −19 | 28 | Spared from relegation |
| 16 | Stade Poitevin (Note: Stade Poitevin were excluded from the national championships due to financial mismanagement.) (D, R) | 30 | 5 | 11 | 14 | 21 | 43 | −22 | 25 (Note: Stade Poitevin were deducted one point.) | Demoted to Régional |

Source: soccerway, fff
Rules for classification: 1) points; 2) head-to-head results; 3) head-to-head goal difference; 4) goal difference; 5) number of goals scored; 6) fair play points; 7) draw
(C) Champions; (D) Disqualified; (P) Promoted; (R) Relegated

==== Results table ====
| Home \ Away | ANG | AVR | BAY | BOR | CHT | CHU | DIN | GRA | LAR | LSH | LOR | MON | SCL | STM | SAU | STP |
|---|---|---|---|---|---|---|---|---|---|---|---|---|---|---|---|---|
| Angoulême | — | 1–2 | 1–0 | 0–0 | 2–0 | 2–2 | 3–0 | 1–0 | 1–1 | 1–0 | 3–2 | 1–3 | 2–0 | 1–0 | 2–2 | 3–2 |
| Avranches | 1–0 | — | 0–2 | 3–3 | 2–0 | 3–1 | 0–1 | 1–1 | 0–1 | 3–2 | 1–2 | 3–3 | 2–2 | 1–0 | 5–2 | 4–0 |
| Bayonne | 5–0 | 2–1 | — | 1–2 | 2–0 | 2–0 | 2–1 | 0–0 | 2–0 | 2–1 | 2–1 | 3–2 | 0–0 | 1–1 | 3–2 | 1–1 |
| Bordeaux | 1–1 | 0–0 | 1–0 | — | 2–1 | 1–3 | 2–0 | 0–1 | 3–0 | 1–0 | 2–3 | 4–1 | 2–1 | 1–0 | 2–1 | 1–0 |
| Châteaubriant | 0–0 | 1–1 | 2–1 | 1–3 | — | 0–2 | 0–1 | 3–2 | 0–5 | 0–2 | 2–1 | 3–2 | 0–1 | 2–1 | 1–4 | 0–0 |
| Chauray | 0–0 | 1–0 | 0–1 | 0–1 | 3–1 | — | 0–1 | 0–1 | 0–1 | 2–1 | 1–0 | 2–1 | 0–1 | 0–1 | 3–3 | 2–1 |
| Dinan Léhon | 3–1 | 3–2 | 2–3 | 1–3 | 2–1 | 1–0 | — | 4–2 | 2–4 | 1–3 | 0–3 | 1–1 | 0–1 | 1–1 | 6–0 | 0–1 |
| Granville | 3–0 | 1–1 | 0–1 | 2–3 | 2–0 | 0–0 | 0–2 | — | 0–0 | 1–2 | 1–2 | 1–2 | 1–0 | 1–1 | 1–1 | 1–1 |
| La Roche | 1–1 | 1–0 | 1–0 | 1–0 | 2–1 | 4–1 | 4–1 | 4–2 | — | 1–1 | 2–1 | 2–1 | 3–3 | 3–3 | 4–0 | 4–0 |
| Les Herbiers | 0–0 | 3–3 | 2–0 | 2–1 | 3–0 | 3–1 | 1–1 | 2–2 | 2–0 | — | 1–0 | 4–0 | 2–0 | 0–1 | 1–0 | 2–1 |
| Lorient (res) | 2–0 | 2–4 | 1–0 | 0–2 | 0–2 | 0–3 | 0–4 | 1–1 | 0–2 | 4–2 | — | 2–1 | 1–1 | 3–0 | 2–2 | 1–1 |
| Montlouis | 0–1 | 1–2 | 2–1 | 2–2 | 1–1 | 0–0 | 2–0 | 1–2 | 1–4 | 1–2 | 2–0 | — | 4–1 | 2–2 | 1–1 | 2–1 |
| Saint-Colomban Locminé | 3–0 | 1–1 | 1–2 | 1–2 | 0–1 | 2–1 | 0–1 | 1–1 | 0–2 | 2–0 | 1–0 | 1–1 | — | 1–0 | 0–0 | 3–0 |
| Saint-Malo | 1–1 | 2–0 | 2–0 | 2–1 | 0–0 | 4–2 | 2–1 | 3–1 | 1–1 | 0–0 | 4–2 | 1–1 | 1–1 | — | 3–0 | 2–0 |
| Saumur | 2–1 | 2–0 | 0–1 | 0–2 | 0–2 | 1–3 | 2–2 | 3–1 | 0–3 | 3–0 | 2–2 | 0–0 | 3–1 | 0–2 | — | 1–2 |
| Stade Poitevin | 0–3 | 0–0 | 0–2 | 0–3 | 0–0 | 1–2 | 1–1 | 1–0 | 0–0 | 1–1 | 2–0 | 2–1 | 1–1 | 1–2 | 0–0 | — |

Source: soccerway, fff
Legend: Blue = home team win; Yellow = draw; Red = away team win.

=== Group B ===
| Pos | Team | Pld | W | D | L | GF | GA | GD | Pts | Promotion or relegation |
|---|---|---|---|---|---|---|---|---|---|---|
| 1 | Thionville (C, P) | 30 | 18 | 6 | 6 | 53 | 36 | +17 | 60 | Promotion to Ligue 3 |
| 2 | Bourges | 30 | 14 | 10 | 6 | 35 | 24 | +11 | 52 | |
| 3 | Haguenau | 30 | 14 | 9 | 7 | 43 | 29 | +14 | 51 | |
| 4 | Feignies Aulnoye | 30 | 12 | 10 | 8 | 41 | 24 | +17 | 46 | |
| 5 | Furiani-Agliani | 30 | 13 | 6 | 11 | 45 | 40 | +5 | 45 | |
| 6 | Saint-Pryvé Saint-Hilaire | 30 | 12 | 6 | 12 | 48 | 44 | +4 | 42 | |
| 7 | Dieppe | 30 | 11 | 8 | 11 | 31 | 36 | −5 | 41 | |
| 8 | Borgo | 30 | 11 | 7 | 12 | 32 | 37 | −5 | 40 | |
| 9 | Épinal | 30 | 11 | 7 | 12 | 32 | 37 | −5 | 40 | |
| 10 | Biesheim | 30 | 10 | 10 | 10 | 31 | 37 | −6 | 39 (Note: Biesheim were deducted one point.) | |
| 11 | Colmar | 30 | 9 | 11 | 10 | 41 | 43 | −2 | 37 (Note: Colmar were deducted one point.) | |
| 12 | Beauvais (D, R) | 30 | 9 | 11 | 10 | 39 | 42 | −3 | 35 (Note: Beauvais were deducted three points.) | Demoted to Régional |
| 13 | Wasquehal (D, R) | 30 | 10 | 4 | 16 | 28 | 44 | −16 | 34 | Demoted to Régional |
| 14 | Chambly | 30 | 9 | 10 | 11 | 35 | 35 | 0 | 34 (Note: Chambly were deducted three points.) | Spared from relegation |
| 15 | Chantilly | 30 | 6 | 9 | 15 | 32 | 42 | −10 | 27 | Spared from relegation |
| 16 | Blois (R) | 30 | 7 | 4 | 19 | 31 | 47 | −16 | 25 | Relegation to National 2 |

Source: soccerway, fff
Rules for classification: 1) points; 2) head-to-head results; 3) head-to-head goal difference; 4) goal difference; 5) number of goals scored; 6) fair play points; 7) draw
(C) Champions; (D) Disqualified; (P) Promoted; (R) Relegated

==== Results table ====
| Home \ Away | BEA | BIE | BLO | BOR | BOU | CHM | CHN | COL | DIE | ÉPI | EFA | FUR | HAG | SPH | THI | WAS |
|---|---|---|---|---|---|---|---|---|---|---|---|---|---|---|---|---|
| Beauvais | — | 5–1 | 2–0 | 1–2 | 0–0 | 0–0 | 4–1 | 1–1 | 1–1 | 1–2 | 1–1 | 2–2 | 1–1 | 0–3 | 1–2 | 0–0 |
| Biesheim | 1–1 | — | 1–1 | 3–0 | 0–1 | 0–0 | 2–1 | 0–4 | 2–0 | 0–1 | 0–0 | 2–1 | 0–0 | 1–1 | 0–1 | 2–1 |
| Blois | 4–1 | 0–1 | — | 1–1 | 3–1 | 0–0 | 1–2 | 0–2 | 0–1 | 0–1 | 1–0 | 1–2 | 1–2 | 3–1 | 0–3 | 1–0 |
| Borgo | 2–0 | 2–1 | 1–1 | — | 2–3 | 1–2 | 1–0 | 0–1 | 1–1 | 2–1 | 0–3 | 1–1 | 0–1 | 1–0 | 3–0 | 1–1 |
| Bourges | 0–1 | 2–0 | 2–0 | 2–0 | — | 2–0 | 0–0 | 1–1 | 0–0 | 2–1 | 0–3 | 2–0 | 1–0 | 1–0 | 0–0 | 2–0 |
| Chambly | 2–3 | 2–2 | 2–1 | 1–2 | 0–0 | — | 1–3 | 6–0 | 3–0 | 0–0 | 4–2 | 3–2 | 1–1 | 1–2 | 1–0 | 0–3 |
| Chantilly | 2–3 | 1–1 | 2–0 | 0–1 | 1–1 | 0–0 | — | 1–1 | 1–2 | 0–1 | 0–0 | 1–2 | 0–1 | 3–2 | 1–2 | 1–2 |
| Colmar | 1–0 | 1–2 | 2–0 | 1–1 | 1–2 | 0–1 | 3–3 | — | 0–0 | 0–3 | 3–1 | 1–2 | 2–3 | 3–0 | 0–0 | 3–3 |
| Dieppe | 1–0 | 3–0 | 2–4 | 2–1 | 3–0 | 1–1 | 0–0 | 0–2 | — | 0–1 | 0–0 | 1–0 | 0–0 | 1–2 | 2–3 | 0–1 |
| Épinal | 1–3 | 2–1 | 1–0 | 1–2 | 1–1 | 1–0 | 3–2 | 1–1 | 0–1 | — | 0–1 | 2–1 | 0–4 | 2–2 | 0–2 | 0–1 |
| Feignies Aulnoye | 5–1 | 1–1 | 1–0 | 1–2 | 1–0 | 3–0 | 1–0 | 1–1 | 1–2 | 2–1 | — | 4–0 | 1–1 | 0–1 | 1–1 | 4–0 |
| Furiani-Agliani | 3–0 | 1–1 | 1–0 | 1–0 | 1–1 | 2–0 | 2–1 | 2–0 | 1–2 | 0–0 | 2–0 | — | 1–0 | 5–2 | 2–4 | 2–0 |
| Haguenau | 2–3 | 1–2 | 2–4 | 3–1 | 0–0 | 1–0 | 1–1 | 3–1 | 3–1 | 0–0 | 1–1 | 2–1 | — | 3–1 | 1–2 | 0–1 |
| Saint-Pryvé Saint-Hilaire | 0–0 | 2–1 | 5–2 | 2–0 | 1–2 | 3–0 | 0–1 | 2–2 | 3–0 | 4–2 | 0–0 | 1–1 | 1–2 | — | 1–2 | 4–0 |
| Thionville | 1–1 | 1–2 | 1–0 | 1–1 | 1–4 | 0–4 | 3–1 | 4–2 | 4–0 | 2–2 | 1–0 | 4–3 | 1–3 | 4–0 | — | 1–0 |
| Wasquehal | 0–2 | 0–1 | 4–2 | 1–0 | 3–2 | 0–0 | 1–2 | 0–1 | 1–4 | 2–1 | 0–2 | 2–1 | 0–1 | 1–2 | 0–2 | — |

Source: soccerway, fff
Legend: Blue = home team win; Yellow = draw; Red = away team win.

=== Group C ===
| Pos | Team | Pld | W | D | L | GF | GA | GD | Pts | Promotion or relegation |
|---|---|---|---|---|---|---|---|---|---|---|
| 1 | Cannes (C, P) | 30 | 17 | 9 | 4 | 53 | 30 | +23 | 60 | Promotion to Ligue 3 |
| 2 | Nîmes | 30 | 18 | 5 | 7 | 46 | 25 | +21 | 59 | |
| 3 | Lusitanos Saint-Maur | 30 | 15 | 10 | 5 | 40 | 24 | +16 | 55 | |
| 4 | Rumilly-Vallières | 30 | 13 | 8 | 9 | 49 | 36 | +13 | 47 | |
| 5 | Hyères | 30 | 11 | 12 | 7 | 36 | 27 | +9 | 45 | |
| 6 | Andrézieux | 30 | 12 | 9 | 9 | 48 | 33 | +15 | 45 | |
| 7 | Istres | 30 | 11 | 10 | 9 | 42 | 32 | +10 | 43 | |
| 8 | Créteil | 30 | 12 | 7 | 11 | 36 | 34 | +2 | 43 | |
| 9 | GOAL FC | 30 | 11 | 8 | 11 | 38 | 46 | −8 | 40 (Note: GOAL FC were deducted one point.) | |
| 10 | Pays de Grasse (D, R) | 30 | 9 | 9 | 12 | 41 | 42 | −1 | 36 | Demoted to Régional |
| 11 | Fréjus Saint-Raphaël | 30 | 9 | 8 | 13 | 37 | 50 | −13 | 35 | |
| 12 | Limonest | 30 | 9 | 7 | 14 | 36 | 49 | −13 | 34 | |
| 13 | FC 93 (D, R) | 30 | 7 | 11 | 12 | 29 | 31 | −2 | 32 | Demoted to Régional |
| 14 | Toulon | 30 | 8 | 10 | 12 | 38 | 47 | −9 | 31 (Note: Toulon were deducted three points.) | Spared from relegation |
| 15 | Saint-Priest | 30 | 7 | 9 | 14 | 35 | 50 | −15 | 30 | Spared from relegation |
| 16 | Rousset (R) | 30 | 2 | 6 | 22 | 28 | 76 | −48 | 12 | Relegation to National 2 |

Source: soccerway, fff
Rules for classification: 1) points; 2) head-to-head results; 3) head-to-head goal difference; 4) goal difference; 5) number of goals scored; 6) fair play points; 7) draw
(C) Champions; (D) Disqualified; (P) Promoted; (R) Relegated

==== Results table ====
| Home \ Away | AND | CAN | CRÉ | F93 | FSR | GOA | HYÈ | IST | LIM | LSM | NÎM | PDG | ROU | RUM | STP | TOU |
|---|---|---|---|---|---|---|---|---|---|---|---|---|---|---|---|---|
| Andrézieux | — | 2–0 | 1–0 | 3–1 | 1–1 | 3–0 | 0–1 | 3–1 | 0–1 | 0–1 | 4–1 | 1–2 | 6–3 | 2–1 | 5–1 | 3–0 |
| Cannes | 2–1 | — | 3–0 | 1–0 | 4–0 | 2–1 | 1–1 | 2–2 | 3–1 | 2–0 | 0–0 | 3–1 | 3–0 | 0–3 | 3–2 | 1–0 |
| Créteil | 0–2 | 0–0 | — | 2–0 | 2–0 | 5–4 | 1–0 | 1–2 | 2–0 | 0–3 | 0–0 | 0–2 | 1–1 | 1–1 | 2–1 | 5–1 |
| FC 93 | 3–0 | 0–1 | 1–1 | — | 1–0 | 0–2 | 0–2 | 1–1 | 1–2 | 1–0 | 0–2 | 2–1 | 7–0 | 3–2 | 0–1 | 1–1 |
| Fréjus Saint-Raphaël | 1–1 | 0–1 | 2–1 | 1–2 | — | 3–1 | 1–1 | 3–4 | 1–4 | 0–2 | 0–2 | 1–0 | 3–1 | 1–3 | 0–0 | 0–1 |
| GOAL FC | 0–0 | 0–5 | 1–2 | 0–0 | 0–2 | — | 1–1 | 1–0 | 2–2 | 1–1 | 2–0 | 3–2 | 2–1 | 2–1 | 1–0 | 1–2 |
| Hyères | 1–0 | 3–3 | 1–0 | 0–0 | 2–3 | 3–1 | — | 0–1 | 1–1 | 0–2 | 1–2 | 1–1 | 1–0 | 1–0 | 4–1 | 2–1 |
| Istres | 1–1 | 1–1 | 0–0 | 1–0 | 4–0 | 1–2 | 0–0 | — | 0–1 | 0–1 | 2–0 | 0–0 | 4–1 | 0–1 | 1–2 | 4–0 |
| Limonest | 1–1 | 1–1 | 0–1 | 1–0 | 0–2 | 3–0 | 1–1 | 1–4 | — | 0–1 | 2–3 | 1–3 | 1–1 | 0–5 | 2–0 | 2–0 |
| Lusitanos Saint-Maur | 2–1 | 1–1 | 2–1 | 1–1 | 1–1 | 1–1 | 1–1 | 1–0 | 3–2 | — | 2–0 | 1–0 | 1–1 | 1–1 | 1–1 | 0–1 |
| Nîmes | 1–1 | 3–0 | 2–0 | 0–0 | 3–0 | 2–0 | 2–0 | 3–0 | 2–0 | 1–2 | — | 2–0 | 3–1 | 1–2 | 3–0 | 3–2 |
| Pays de Grasse | 2–2 | 1–3 | 1–1 | 0–0 | 1–2 | 1–2 | 0–0 | 2–2 | 3–1 | 2–1 | 0–0 | — | 3–1 | 1–2 | 3–4 | 2–1 |
| Rousset | 0–2 | 1–3 | 1–4 | 0–0 | 2–2 | 1–3 | 0–4 | 0–1 | 2–1 | 0–3 | 1–2 | 2–5 | — | 2–1 | 2–3 | 2–3 |
| Rumilly-Vallières | 1–1 | 1–1 | 0–1 | 3–2 | 1–3 | 1–1 | 3–2 | 1–1 | 3–0 | 1–0 | 3–1 | 1–2 | 1–0 | — | 1–1 | 2–2 |
| Saint-Priest | 1–1 | 0–1 | 1–0 | 2–2 | 3–3 | 0–2 | 0–1 | 1–2 | 1–1 | 2–3 | 0–1 | 0–0 | 2–0 | 1–2 | — | 2–2 |
| Toulon | 3–0 | 4–2 | 1–2 | 0–0 | 1–1 | 1–1 | 0–0 | 2–2 | 2–3 | 1–1 | 0–1 | 2–0 | 1–1 | 2–1 | 1–2 | — |

Source: soccerway, fff
Legend: Blue = home team win; Yellow = draw; Red = away team win.
