= Stéphane Rossi =

French footballer (born 1964)

Personal information
- Date of birth: 26 March 1964 (age 62)
- Place of birth: Bastia, France
- Positions: Midfielder; forward

Team information
- Current team: Paris 13 Atletico (manager)

Senior career*
Years	Team	Apps	(Gls)
1981–1982	Bastia B		
1982–1983	CA Bastia		
1983–1984	Toulon B		
1984–1986	CA Bastia		
1986–1997	Cervione		
1997–2001	Bastia Gallia Lucciana		

Managerial career
- 1995–1997: Cervione (player-manager)
- 2000–2003: Bastia Gallia Lucciana
- 2003–2015: CA Bastia
- 2016–2017: CA Bastia
- 2017–2019: Bastia
- 2019–2021: Cholet
- 2021–2022: Bastia-Borgo
- 2022–2023: Cholet
- 2023–2024: Bourges
- 2024–2026: Concarneau
- 2026–: Paris 13 Atletico
- * Club domestic league appearances and goals

Stéphane Rossi (born 23 March 1964) is a French football manager and a former player who is the manager of Ligue 3 club Paris 13 Atletico. He played as a midfielder or forward.

== Coaching career ==
On 4 November 2021, Rossi was hired by Championnat National club Bastia-Borgo.

On 27 May 2022, Rossi was signed by Cholet.
