= Stade Henri-Desgrange =

Stadium in La Roche-sur-Yon, France

Coordinates: 46°40′17″N 1°26′27″W

Stade Henri Desgranges
- Interactive map of Stade Henri Desgranges
- Location: La Roche-sur-Yon, France
- Capacity: 10,000
- Surface: Grass

Construction
- Opened: 1939

Tenant
- VFC La Roche-sur-Yon

Stade Henri Desgranges is a stadium in La Roche-sur-Yon, France. It is currently used for football matches and is the home stadium of VFC La Roche-sur-Yon. The stadium holds 10,000 spectators.
