= Ligue 3 =

French association football league

- Organising body: French Football Federation
- Founded: 1993; 33 years ago (as Championnat National); 2026; 0 years ago (as Ligue 3)
- Country: France
- Confederation: UEFA
- Number of clubs: 18
- Level on pyramid: 3
- Promotion to: Ligue 2
- Relegation to: National 1
- Domestic cup: Coupe de France
- Current champions: Dijon (1st title) (2025–26)
- Most championships: Red Star (3 titles)
- Broadcaster(s): Ligue 1+
- Current: 2026–27 Ligue 3

Ligue 3 (English: League 3 or Ligue 3 Betclic for sponsorship reasons from 2026 onwards), formerly known as the Championnat National (English: French National Championship), is a professional men's football league that serves as the third tier of the French football league system, behind Ligue 1 and Ligue 2. Contested by 18 clubs, Ligue 3 operates on a system of promotion and relegation with Ligue 2 and the Championnat National 1, the fourth division of French football.

Seasons run from August to May, with teams playing 34 games each, totalling 306 games in the season. Most games are played on Fridays and Saturdays, with a few games played during weekday evenings. Play is regularly suspended the last weekend before Christmas for two weeks before returning in the second week of January.

Ahead of the 2026–27 season, the Championnat National was reformed to create a professional Ligue 3.

== History ==
The league was founded in 1993 by the French Football Federation (FFF) and served as a "base league" for clubs on the brink of becoming professional or falling to the amateur levels. The league was annually composed of professional and semi-professional clubs or amateur clubs. The matches in the league attract on average between 2,500 and 6,000 spectators per match.

On 16 January 2025, during a press conference, FFF president Philippe Diallo announced the creation of a professional Ligue 3 from the 2026–27 season. The initiative was made official by the FFF's executive committee on 12 May 2026.

== Competition format ==
There are 18 clubs in Ligue 3. During the course of a season, usually from August to May, each club plays the others twice, once at their home stadium and once at that of their opponents, for a total of 34 games. Teams receive three points for a win and one point for a draw. No points are awarded for a loss. Teams are ranked by total points, then head-to-head points, then goal difference, and then goals scored. At the end of each season, the club with the most points is crowned champion and promoted to Ligue 2. If points are equal, the goal difference and then goals scored determine the winner. If still equal, teams are deemed to occupy the same position. If there is a tie for the championship or for relegation, a play-off match at a neutral venue decides rank. The first and second place finisher are also promoted to the second division, while the three lowest placed teams are relegated to the Championnat National 1 and the three winners of the three groups from Championnat National 1 are promoted in their place until last season.

== Current clubs ==
For the 2026–27 season.

Locations of teams in the 2026–27 Ligue 3.
Locations of teams in the 2026–27 Ligue 3 from Île-de-France

Team	Location	Stadium	Capacity
Amiens^{↓}	Amiens	Stade de la Licorne	12,097
Aubagne Air Bel	Aubagne	Stade de Lattre-de-Tassigny	1,000
Bastia^{↓}	Bastia	Stade Armand-Cesari	16,048
Bourg-Péronnas	Bourg-en-Bresse	Stade Marcel-Verchère	11,400
Caen	Caen	Stade Michel d'Ornano	21,215
Cannes^{↑}	Cannes	Stade Pierre de Coubertin	9,819
Concarneau	Concarneau	Stade Guy-Piriou	5,800
Fleury	Fleury-Mérogis	Essonne Stadium	18,850
La Roche-sur-Yon^{↑}	La Roche-sur-Yon	Stade Henri Desgranges	10,000
Le Puy	Le Puy-en-Velay	Stade Charles Massot	4,800
Orléans	Orléans	Stade de la Source	7,000
Paris 13 Atletico	Paris (Paris 13)	Stade Sébastien Charléty	20,000
Quevilly-Rouen	Rouen	Stade Robert Diochon	8,372
Rouen	Rouen	Stade Robert Diochon	8,372
Thionville^{↑}	Thionville	Stade de la Plaine	1,000
Valenciennes	Valenciennes	Stade du Hainaut	25,172
Versailles	Versailles	Stade de Montbauron	7,545
Villefranche	Villefranche-sur-Saône	Stade Armand-Chouffet	3,500

^{↓}	Relegated from the Ligue 2
^{↑}	Promoted from the National 2

== Table of honours ==
Championnat National 1
Season	Group A Winner	Group B Winner	Other promoted teams
1993–94	En Avant de Guingamp	LB Châteauroux	Amiens SC and Perpignan FC
1994–95	FC Lorient	SAS Épinal	Stade Poitevin and CS Louhans-Cuiseaux
1995–96	Stade Briochin	Sporting Toulon Var	Association Troyes AC and AS Beauvais Oise
1996–97	ES Wasquehal	Nîmes Olympique	
Championnat National
Season	Champion	Runner-up	Third place
1997–98	AC Ajaccio	CS Sedan Ardennes	US Créteil-Lusitanos (not promoted)
1998–99	CS Louhans-Cuiseaux	US Créteil-Lusitanos	Gazélec Ajaccio (not promoted)
1999–2000	AS Beauvais Oise	FC Martigues	Angers SCO
2000–01	Grenoble Foot 38	Amiens SC	FC Istres
2001–02	Clermont Foot	Stade de Reims	ASOA Valence and Toulouse FC (4 clubs promoted this season)
2002–03	Besançon Racing Club	Angers SCO	FC Rouen
2003–04	Stade de Reims	Stade Brestois 29	Dijon FCO
2004–05	Valenciennes FC	ASOA Valence (not promoted due to financial problems)	FC Sète 34
2005–06	Chamois Niortais	Tours FC	FC Libourne-Saint-Seurin
2006–07	Clermont Foot (2)	US Boulogne	Angers SCO
2007–08	Vannes OC	Tours FC	Nîmes Olympique
2008–09	FC Istres	Stade Lavallois	AC Arles
2009–10	Evian Thonon Gaillard	Stade de Reims	ES Troyes AC
2010–11	SC Bastia	Amiens SC	En Avant de Guingamp
2011–12	Nîmes Olympique (2)	Chamois Niortais	Gazélec Ajaccio
2012–13	US Créteil-Lusitanos	FC Metz	CA Bastia
2013–14	US Orléans	US Luzenac	Gazélec Ajaccio
2014–15	Red Star	Paris FC	FC Bourg-Péronnas
2015–16	Strasbourg	Orléans	Amiens
2016–17	Châteauroux	Quevilly	Paris FC (Promotion Play-Off)
2017–18	Red Star (2)	Béziers	Grenoble
2018–19	Rodez	Chambly	Le Mans
2019–20	Pau (Note: Championship not awarded due to season being terminated early.)	USL Dunkerque	US Boulogne
2020–21	SC Bastia (2)	Quevilly-Rouen	Villefranche
2021–22	Laval	Annecy	Villefranche
2022–23	Concarneau	Dunkerque	Red Star
2023–24	Red Star (3)	Martigues	Chamois Niortais (not promoted)
2024–25	Nancy	Le Mans	US Boulogne
2025–26	Dijon	Sochaux	Rouen
Ligue 3
Season	Champions	Runner-up	Third place
2026–27	TBD	TBD	TBD
