= US Lusitanos Saint-Maur =

Association football club in France

- Full name: Union Sportive Lusitanos Saint-Maur
- Nickname: Les Lusitanos
- Founded: 1966; 60 years ago
- Stadium: Stade Adolphe-Chéron
- Capacity: 3,500
- Chairman: Arthur Machado
- Manager: Adérito Moreira
- League: National 1 Group C
- 2025-26: National 2 Group C, 3rd
- Website: uslusitanos.fr
| Home colours | Away colours |

Union Sportive Lusitanos Saint-Maur or US Lusitanos Saint-Maur is a French football club based in Saint-Maur-des-Fossés, Val-de-Marne, the southeastern suburbs of Paris.

The club was founded in 1966 by Portuguese immigrants who worked in a factory in the town. They play their games at the Stade Adolphe-Chéron. They have twice reached the Championnat National, the third level of French football, and in 2002 they reached the round of 16 in the Coupe de France.

As of the 2026–27 season, the club plays in Championnat National 1, the fourth level of French football.

== History ==
US Lusitanos Saint-Maur was founded in 1966 by José Lebre, amongst the Portuguese immigrant community in the town of Saint-Maur-des-Fossés. Initially the club consisted entirely of first generation Portuguese, but before long it needed to recruit second generation immigrants with French nationality in order to expand.

In 1975 Armand Lopes, one of the sponsors of the club, took over and set goals for the club to rise up to the national leagues within five years. This took longer than planned, but they arrived in the newly formed National 3 in 1993, as champions of the Division d'Honneur in the Paris region. They gained promotion to National 2 the following season, and two seasons later reached Championnat National, the highest amateur division in the country.

After finishing fourth at the first attempt, the club moved up and down between the Championnat National and Championnat de France Amateur, as National 2 had now become. In the 2001–02 season, back in the Championnat National, they reached the last 16 of the Coupe de France, beating Ligue 1 side Girondins de Bordeaux in the round of 32.

They suffered another relegation back to the CFA in 2002, and due to a failed merger with US Créteil-Lusitanos and failure to properly register the team, they were administratively relegated to the Division Supérieure Régionale of the Paris region, effectively level seven of French football. They remained in regional football for more than a decade. In 2012 Arthur Machado was elected as president, restructuring the club.

The club gained promotion again to Championnat de France Amateur 2 (level 5) in 2015 and to the CFA in 2016.

== Famous players ==
- (France) Dilane Bakwa (youth)
- (France) Soungoutou Magassa (youth)
