= Championnat National 1 =

French association football league

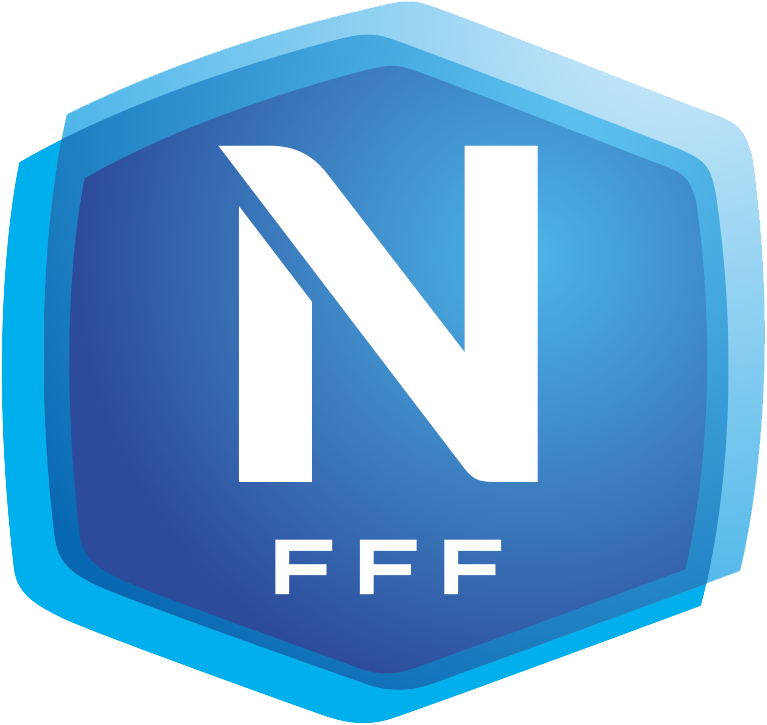
- Organising body: FFF
- Founded: 1993; 33 years ago
- Country: France
- Confederation: UEFA
- Number of clubs: 48 (3 groups of 16)
- Level on pyramid: 4
- Promotion to: Ligue 3
- Relegation to: National 2
- Domestic cup: Coupe de France
- Current champions: La Roche-sur-Yon (2025–26)
- Website: Official site
- Current: 2026–27 Championnat National 1

The Championnat National 1, commonly known as National 1 and formerly known as Championnat de France Amateur (CFA) and Championnat National 2, is a football league competition. The league serves as the fourth tier of French football league system behind Ligue 1, Ligue 2 and Ligue 3. Contested by 48 clubs, the Championnat National 1 operates on a system of promotion and relegation with the Ligue 3 and National 2, the fifth division of French football. Seasons run from August to May, with teams in the three groups playing 30 games each. Most games are played on Saturdays and Sundays, with a few games played during weekday evenings. Play is regularly suspended the last weekend before Christmas for two weeks before returning in the second week of January.

The current incarnation of the league is a simple rebrand of the CFA, which was founded in 1993 as National 2 and lasted for five years before being converted to the CFA name in 1998, the National 2 name in 2017 and the National 1 name in 2026. Some clubs that participate in the league are semi-professional. The matches in the league attract on average between 800 and 1,000 spectators per match. However, this average has been dragged down by the minuscule turnouts for the pros' home reserve matches.

== History ==
The league was created in 1993 under the name Championnat National 2, as an heir to the now-defunct Division 3. The league's debut coincided with the creation of the Championnat National, the third division of French football, commonly known as National. For the first three years of the competition, an amateur champion was crowned in France regardless of whether the club was amateur or a reserve team. In 1998, the French Football Federation changed the competition's format creating two separate tables; one for the amateur clubs and another for the reserve teams of professional clubs. The dual tables allowed the league to declare a champion for the amateurs and the reserves, with four team tournaments being held following the conclusion of league play to determine the champions. At the same time, the competition was renamed Championnat de France Amateur (CFA). In 2001, the federation ended this style and reverted to the original format allowing both the amateur clubs and reserve teams to be grouped together based on their regional location. The winner of each group would then earn promotion to the Championnat National, unless the club is a reserve team. Meanwhile, the reserve teams continued to use the previous format with the best reserve teams of each group being inserted into a tournament to decide the reserves' champion.

In 2017, the FFF reorganised amateur football along the lines of the 2016 reorganisation of the Regions of France, creating the Championnat National 2 and Championnat National 3 to replace CFA and CFA2. For National 2, this was in effect just a change of name, whilst National 3 saw a major restructure.

As part of the restructure of the French football leagues system between 2022 and 2026, the league was reduced from 64 teams across 4 groups in 2022–23, to 56 across 4 groups in 2023–24, and will have 48 teams across 3 groups from 2024 to 2025.

Ahead of the 2026–27 season, National 2 was renamed to Championnat National 1.

== Competition format ==
For the 2024–25 season, forty-eight clubs participated. The clubs were split into three parallel groups of 16 with their group affiliation being loosely based on the regional location. The league is open to the best reserve teams in France and amateur clubs in France, although only the amateur clubs are eligible for promotion to Ligue 3. During the course of a season, usually from August to May, each club plays the others in their respective group twice, once at their home stadium and once at that of their opponents, for a total of 30 games. Teams are ranked by total points, then head-to-head results and head-to-head goal difference. At the end of each season, the group champions are promoted to Championnat National and the best performing group champion is crowned overall champion of the season. For the 2024–25 season, the three lowest-ranked teams in each group were relegated to Championnat National 3, along with the worst performing thirteenth-placed team.

== Teams ==
The following teams competed in the Championnat National 1 for the 2026–27 season.

=== Group A ===
Club Name
Angoulême
Avranches
Bayonne
Châteaubriant
Chauray
Dinan Léhon
Granville
La Roche
Les Herbiers
Lorient (reserves)
Montlouis
Poitiers
Saint-Colomban Locminé
Saint-Malo
Saumur

=== Group B ===
Club Name
Beauvais
Biesheim
Blois
Borgo
Bourges
Chambly
Chantilly
Colmar
Dieppe
Épinal
Feignies Aulnoye
Furiani-Agliani
Haguenau
Saint-Pryvé Saint-Hilaire
Thionville
Wasquehal

=== Group C ===
Club Name
Andrézieux
Cannes
Créteil
FC 93
Fréjus Saint-Raphaël
GOAL FC
Hyères
Istres
Limonest
Lusitanos Saint-Maur
Nîmes
Pays de Grasse
Rousset
Rumilly-Vallières
Saint-Priest
Toulon

== Performance ==
=== Group winners ===
4 groups (1993–2024)

Championnat National 2
Season	Group A Winner	Group B Winner	Group C Winner	Group D Winner
1993–94	FCSR Haguenau	AS Monaco B	Stade Poitevin PEPP	AJ Auxerre B
1994–95	ES Wasquehal	AS Cannes B	AJ Auxerre B	SM Caen B
1995–96	US Lusitanos Saint-Maur	Stade Montois	AJ Auxerre B	FC Bourges
1996–97	FC Metz B	AC Ajaccio	Olympique Lyonnais B	AJ Auxerre B
Championnat de France Amateur
Season	Group A Winner	Group B Winner	Group C Winner	Group D Winner
1997–98	Valenciennes FC	Olympique Lyonnais B	Pau FC	AJ Auxerre B
1998–99	AJ Auxerre B	Grenoble Foot 38	Clermont Foot	AS Évry
1999–2000 (Note: The champion was Dijon FCO, second of group A.)	AJ Auxerre B	Olympique Lyonnais B	La Roche VF	Stade brestois 29
2000–01	US Boulogne CO	FC Sète 34	AS Angoulême	US Lusitanos Saint-Maur
2001–02 (Note: The champion was AS Cherbourg, second of group D.)	Lille OSC B	Olympique de Marseille B	SO Romorantin	AJ Auxerre B
2002–03 (Note: The champion was Gazélec Ajaccio, third of group C.)	Paris Saint-Germain B	ES Troyes AC B	Olympique Lyonnais B	FC Libourne
2003–04 (Note: The champion was Football Croix-de-Savoie 74, third of group B.)	AJ Auxerre B	Olympique Lyonnais B	Aviron Bayonnais FC	RC Paris
2004–05	US Boulogne CO	CS Louhans-Cuiseaux	SC Toulon	Vannes OC
2005–06	AS Beauvais	FC Martigues	AS Yzeure	Paris FC
2006–07	Calais RUFC	AC Arles	Rodez AF	Villemomble Sports
2007–08	Pacy VEF	Olympique Croix de Savoie 74	SO Cassis Carnoux	Girondins de Bordeaux B
2008–09	Besançon RC	Hyères FC	US Luzenac	FC Rouen
2009–10	SR Colmar	Gap HAFC	Chamois Niortais FC	US Orléans
2010–11	US Quevilly	Besançon RC	Gazélec Ajaccio	Le-Poiré-sur-Vie VF
2011–12	CA Bastia	Olympique Lyonnais B	ES Uzès Pont du Gard	USJA Carquefou
2012–13	USL Dunkerque	RC Strasbourg Alsace	US Colomiers	Luçon VF
2013–14	FC Chambly Thelle	SAS Épinal	GS Consolat	US Avranches
2014–15	CS Sedan-Ardennes	ASM Belfort	AS Béziers	FC Lorient B
2015–16	US Quevilly-Rouen	AS Lyon-Duchère	Pau FC	US Concarneau
2016–17	Stade Rennais FC B	Entente SSG	Grenoble Foot 38	Rodez AF
Championnat National 2
Season	Group A Winner	Group B Winner	Group C Winner	Group D Winner
2017–18	Marignane Gignac FC	FC Villefranche Beaujolais	JA Drancy	Le Mans FC
2018–19	SC Toulon	Le Puy Foot 43 Auvergne	FC Nantes B	US Créteil-Lusitanos
2019–20 (Note: Season terminated early, no overall champion.)	SC Bastia	Stade briochin	FC Sète 04	FC Annecy
2020–21 (Note: Season terminated early, no championship awarded and no promotions except CS Sedan Ardennes as the best second of the previous season.)	none			
2021–22	FC Versailles 78	Paris 13 Atletico	FC Martigues	Le Puy Foot 43 Auvergne
2022–23	FC Rouen	SAS Épinal	Marignane Gignac CB FC	GOAL FC
2023–24	Aubagne FC	Paris 13 Atletico	US Boulogne CO	FC Bourg-Péronnas 01

3 groups (since 2024)

Championnat National 2
Season	Group A Winner	Group B Winner	Group C Winner
2024–25	Le Puy Foot 43 Auvergne	Stade Briochin	FC Fleury 91
2025–26	VFC La Roche-sur-Yon	Thionville Lusitanos	AS Cannes
Championnat National 1
Season	Group A Winner	Group B Winner	Group C Winner
2026–27	TBD	TBD	TBD

Legend

Club named champion by the federation
