= David Le Frapper =

French footballer and coach (born 1971)

Personal information
- Date of birth: 25 March 1971 (age 55)
- Place of birth: Montargis, France
- Height: 1.75 m (5 ft 9 in)
- Position: Midfielder

Senior career*
Years	Team	Apps	(Gls)
1988–1991	Chamois Niortais	24	(1)
1991–1995	Valenciennes	116	(8)
1995–1997	Châteauroux	74	(0)
1997–1999	Chamois Niortais	60	(3)
1999–2001	Créteil	61	(0)
2001–2005	Laval	101	(6)
2005–2007	Gueugnon	46	(0)
Total		482	(18)

Managerial career
- 2007–2008: Carcassonne
- 2008–2009: Châteauroux (youth)
- 2009–2012: Châteauroux (reserves)
- 2014–2015: Valenciennes (U19)
- 2015: Valenciennes
- 2015–2016: Valenciennes (reserves)
- 2016–2019: Marseille (reserves)
- 2019–2021: UGA Ardziv
- 2021–2022: FC Rousset SVO
- 2022–2024: Racing Besançon
- 2024–2026: Bourg-Péronnas
- * Club domestic league appearances and goals

David Le Frapper (born 25 March 1971) is a French professional football coach and a former defensive midfielder.

== Managerial career ==
In May 2022, Le Frapper obtained the Professional Football Coaching Certificate (BEPF), the highest French coaching diploma. Le Frapper was appointed coach of Racing Besançon.
