= VFC La Roche-sur-Yon =

Football club in La Roche-sur-Yon, France

La Roche-sur-Yon
- Full name: Vendée Foot Club La Roche-sur-Yon
- Founded: 1947; 79 years ago
- Ground: Stade Henri Desgranges, La Roche-sur-Yon
- Capacity: 10,000
- President: Christophe Chabot
- Manager: Frédéric Reculeau
- League: Ligue 3
- 2025–26: National 2 Group A, 1st of 16 (promoted)
- Website: https://www.lrvf.com
| Home colours | Away colours |

Vendée Foot Club La Roche-sur-Yon is a French professional association football club based in La Roche-sur-Yon, Vendée, France. They currently play in Ligue 3, the third tier of French football from 2026–27 after promotion from Championnat National 2 in 2025–26.

== History ==
The club was founded in 1947 and play at the Stade Henri Desgranges in the town. The club gained promotion to Championnat National 2 at the end of the 2022–23 season.

In 2025, the club was renamed from La Roche Vendée Football to Vendée Foot Club La Roche-sur-Yon.

On 17 May 2026, VFC La Roche-sur-Yon secured promotion to Ligue 3 for the first time in their history from next season after defeat SCS Locminé 0–2 at away games in final matchweek.

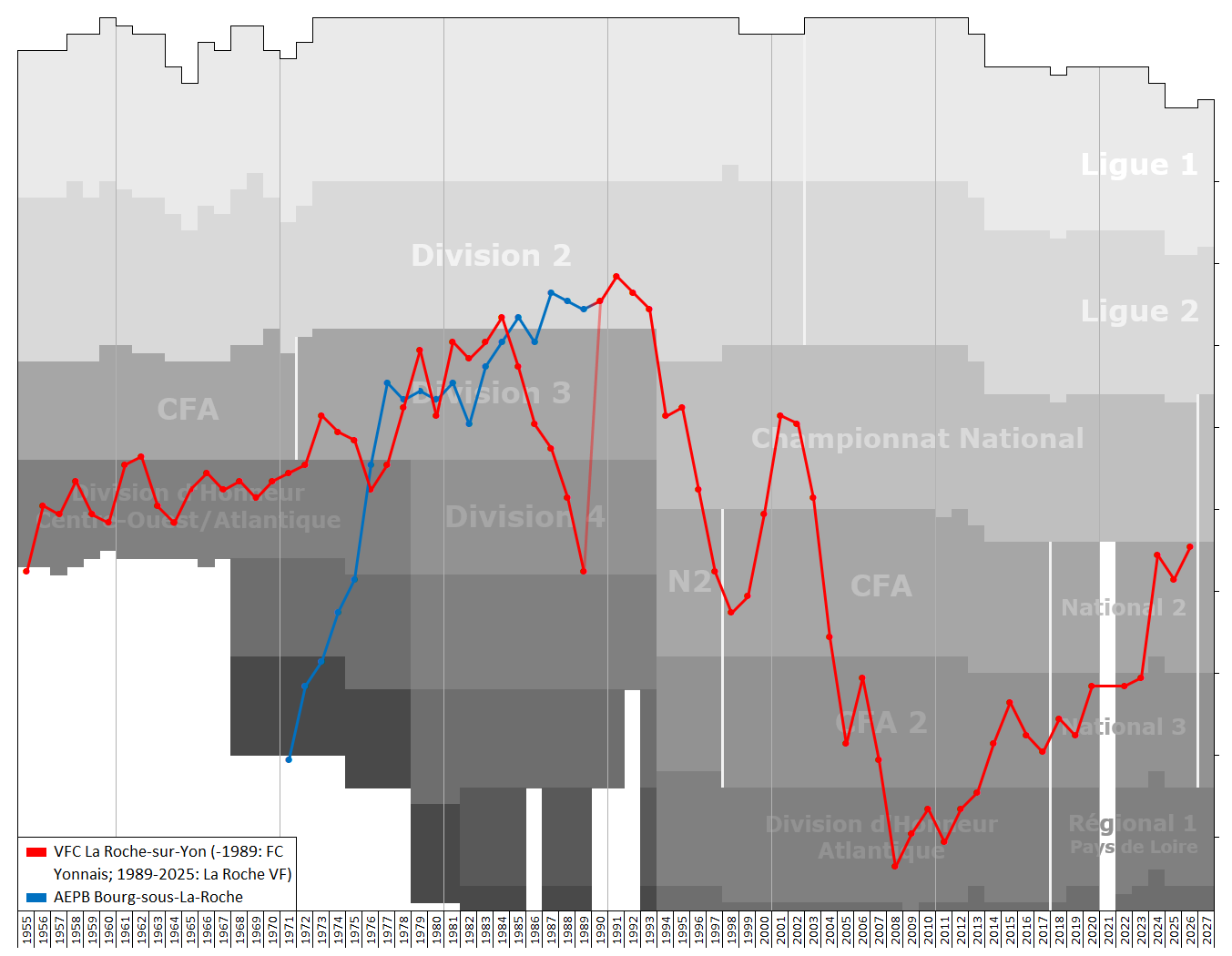
Historical league performance chart of La Roche VF

== Current squad ==
As of 5 September 2026.

Note: Flags indicate national team as defined under FIFA eligibility rules; some limited exceptions apply. Players may hold more than one non-FIFA nationality.

| No. | Pos. | Nation | Player |
|---|---|---|---|
| 1 | GK | FRA | Imbad Ahamada |
| 2 | DF | CMR | Moïse Mahop |
| 4 | DF | FRA | Jean-Charles Behlow |
| 5 | DF | FRA | Thomas Allemand |
| 8 | MF | ALG | Kamil Bensoula |
| 9 | FW | SEN | Mansour Samb (on loan from Horsens) |
| 10 | MF | FRA | Momar Ndiaye |
| 11 | MF | FRA | Djibril Bangoura |
| 14 | DF | FRA | Yohan Baret |
| 15 | DF | FRA | Matthieu Jacob |
| 16 | GK | FRA | Jules Raux |
| 17 | MF | FRA | Matys Vrignon |

| No. | Pos. | Nation | Player |
|---|---|---|---|
| 18 | DF | FRA | Mattéo Rabuel |
| 19 | FW | FRA | Matthieu Villette |
| 20 | FW | POR | Alexis Araujo |
| 21 | DF | MLI | Eden Gassama (on loan from Guingamp) |
| 22 | MF | FRA | Evan Morel |
| 23 | MF | ALG | Sofiane Choubani |
| 25 | FW | POR | Rúben Évora Moniz |
| 26 | MF | FRA | Jonathan Beaulieu |
| 28 | DF | FRA | Tom Renaudineau |
| 29 | DF | FRA | Gatien Violleau |
| 30 | GK | FRA | Antoine Nakkachi |
| 27 | DF | FRA | Hugo Lamy (on loan from Nantes) |

== Notable coaches ==
- (France) Thierry Bonalair
- (France) Lionel Duarte
- (France) Christian Dupont
- (France) Jocelyn Gourvennec
- (France) Christian Letard
- (Poland) Joachim Marx
- (France) Sébastien Migné
- (France) Vincent Rautureau
