= FC Limonest Dardilly Saint-Didier =

French football club

- Full name: Football Club Limonest Dardilly Saint-Didier-au-Mont-d'Or
- Nickname(s): les monarques (The Monarchs)
- Founded: 1969
- Stadium: Stade Honneur
- Capacity: 2,000
- Chairman: Alexandre Vainchtock, Nicolas Barbosa, Cécile Bulin
- Manager: Nicolas Pinard
- League: Championnat National 3 Group K
- 2022–23: Championnat National 3 Group M, 7th

Football Club Limonest Dardilly Saint-Didier-au-Mont-d'Or commonly known as FC Limonest Dardilly Saint-Didier or FC Limonest is a French football club based in Limonest in the Auvergne-Rhône-Alpes region of France. The club was founded in 1969 and since 1994 plays its games at Stade Courtois Fillot in the commune.

The club has climbed steadily through the amateur divisions, winning promotion to the seventh tier in 1979 and the sixth tier in 2007. In 2016, the club won promotion for the first time to the fifth tier, Championnat de France Amateur 2, after winning the final match of the season against FC Vaulx-en-Velin.

In the 2018–19 Coupe de France, the club reached the Round of 64, beating fourth tier Créteil before losing 1–0 to Sète. In the following year's competition they went two rounds better, beating third tier clubs Villefranche and Le Puy, eventually losing to Ligue 1 side Dijon in the Round of 16 at home, to a goal in the last minute of extra time.

In July 2021, the club merged with a neighbouring club, AS Dardilly and became the FC Limonest Dardilly Saint-Didier.

== Honours ==
- Division d'Honneur, Rhône-Alpes: 2016
