= 2023–24 Championnat National 3 =

Championnat National 3
- Season: 2023–24
- Dates: 27 August 2023 – 19 May 2024
- Promoted: 11 teams See Season outcomes section
- Relegated: 34 teams See Season outcomes section
- Biggest home win: Rennes (res) 9–0 Cercle Paul Bert Bréquigny; Group E, Game week 2, 2 September 2023; Vannes 10–1 Cercle Paul Bert Bréquigny; Group E, Game week 15, 3 February 2024
- Highest scoring: Reims (res) 9–2 Belfort; Group I, Game week 2, 2 September 2023; Vannes 10–1 Cercle Paul Bert Bréquigny; Group E, Game week 15, 3 February 2024

The 2023–24 Championnat National 3 was the seventh season of the fifth tier in the French football league system in its current format. For this season only, the competition was contested by 154 clubs split geographically across 11 groups of 14 teams. The teams included amateur clubs (although a few were semi-professional) and the reserve teams of professional clubs. The competition began on 27 August 2023 and ended on 19 May 2024.

== Teams ==
On 13 July 2023, the FFF ratified the constitution of the competition, and published the groups, although there were still some issues to be resolved at the time of publishing.

Changes from the 2022–23 season were as follows:

Teams joining the division

- Évreux, Rennes (res), Vannes, SM Caen (res), Chartres, Reims (res), Sainte-Geneviève, Metz (res), Belfort, Saint-Maur, Sète, Saint-Priest, Lyon (res), Canet Roussillon, Louhans-Cuiseaux, Vierzon, Moulins Yzeure, Stade Bordelais and Nantes (res) finished in relegation positions in 2022–23 Championnat National 2
- Lyon La Duchère were administratively relegated by the DNCG from 2022–23 Championnat National 2.
- 36 teams gained promotion from the various Régional 1 leagues.

Teams promoted to Championnat National 3
Region	Team	Method of qualification
Nouvelle-Aquitaine	Chauray	Champion, R1 Group A
Nouvelle-Aquitaine	Panazol	Champion, R1 Group B
Nouvelle-Aquitaine	Saint-Paul-lès-Dax	Champion, R1 Group C
Pays de la Loire	Les Sables-d'Olonne	Champion, R1 Group A
Pays de la Loire	La Châtaigneraie	Champion, R1 Group B
Pays de la Loire	Château-Gontier	Best runner-up
Centre-Val de Loire	Mainvilliers	Champion, R1
Centre-Val de Loire	Moulon Bourges	Second, R1
Centre-Val de Loire	Vineuil	Third, R1
Corse	SC Bastia (res)	Champion, R1 Corse
Méditerranée	Cagnes-sur-Mer	Champion, R1 Méditerranée
Méditerranée	Fos-sur-Mer	Second, R1 Méditerranée (Note: Originally, ES Saint-Zacharie were promoted, however they were given a points deduction by the league after the end of the season.)
Bourgogne-Franche-Comté	ASPTT Dijon	Champion, R1 Group A
Bourgogne-Franche-Comté	La Chapelle-de-Guinchay	Champion, R1 Group B
Bourgogne-Franche-Comté	Vesoul	Champion, R1 Group C
Grand Est	FC Métropole Troyenne	Champion, R1 Group A
Grand Est	Thionville	Champion, R1 Group B
Grand Est	Strasbourg Koenigshoffen	Champion, R1 Group C
Occitanie	Montferrier-sur-Lez	Champion, R1 Group A
Occitanie	Saint-Estève	Champion, R1 Group B
Occitanie	Blagnac	Champion, R1 Group C
Hauts-de-France	Pays du Valois	Champion, R1 Group A
Hauts-de-France	Saint-Amand-les-Eaux	Champion, R1 Group B
Hauts-de-France	Pays de Cassel	Champion, R1 Group C
Normandy	Flers	Champion, R1 Group A
Normandy	Houlgate	Champion, R1 Group B
Normandy	ASPTT Caen	Best Runner-up
Brittany	Ergué-Gabéric	Champion, R1 Group A
Brittany	Stade Pontivyen	Champion, R1 Group B (Note: Originally Redon.)
Brittany	Cercle Paul Bert Bréquigny	Champion, R1 Group C
Paris Île-de-France	Chatou	Champion, R1 Group A
Paris Île-de-France	Neuilly-sur-Marne	Champion, R1 Group B
Paris Île-de-France	Saint-Ouen-l'Aumône	Best Runner-up
Auvergne-Rhône-Alpes	Espaly-Saint-Marcel	Champion, R1 Group A
Auvergne-Rhône-Alpes	Olympique de Valence	Champion, R1 Group B
Auvergne-Rhône-Alpes	Chassieu	Champion, R1 Group C

Teams leaving the division

- Libourne, La Roche, Avoine Chinon, Cannes, Mâcon, Biesheim, Feignies Aulnoye, Vire, Dinan Léhon, Aubervilliers and Bourgoin-Jallieu were champions of each group, and were promoted to 2023–24 Championnat National 2. Béziers finished top of their group, but were denied promotion by the DNCG, and failed to appeal successfully. Toulouse (res) were promoted as runners-up.
- Mont-de-Marsan, Guéret, Neuville, Portes Entre-Deux-Mers, Pouzauges, Changé, Beaucouzé, La Roche-sur-Yon, Le Mans (res), Montargis, Dreux, Chartres (res), Saint-Jean-le-Blanc, Marignane GCB (res), Nice (res), Carnoux, Quetigny, Montceau, Saint-Apollinaire, Grandvillars, Morteau-Montlebon, Jarville, Illkirch-Graffenstaden, Champigneulles, Épernay, Schiltigheim, Bagnols Pont, Union Saint-Jean, Balma, Rodez (res), Aigues-Mortes, Longueau, Lambres-lez-Douai, AC Amiens, Amiens SC (res), Maubeuge, Mont-Gaillard, Grand-Quevilly, Avranches (res), Gonfreville, US Montagnarde, Dol-de-Bretagne, Brest (res), Cesson, Le Mée, Blanc-Mesnil, Paris Saint-Germain (res), Paris FC (res) and Les Ulis, Montluçon, Lyon La Duchère (res), Aix-les-Bains and Domérat finished in the relegation zones and were relegated to Régional 1 for the 2023–24 season.
- Cherbourg were excluded from National competitions by the Ligue de Normandie, and will be relegated to Régional 1.
- Gazélec Ajaccio were placed into liquidation in January 2023, which resulted in their removal from the league and annulment of all their results.

=== AS Béziers ===
Having been denied promotion, Béziers were placed in Group A when the groups were announced. Subsequently, on 20 July 2023, the DNCG announced Béziers would be downgraded to Régional 1 for financial irregularities. An appeal followed, which was confirmed as unsuccessful on 31 July 2023. Because the decision came after the constitution of the competition was ratified, no team will be reprieved and Group A will take place with 13 teams.

=== Stade Pontivyen and Redon ===
Although declared as part of the division as champions of their Régional 1 group, Redon were eventually denied their promotion on 25 August 2023, one day before the start of the season, after a protracted legal battle, with Stade Pontivyen being promoted in their place.

== Promotion and relegation ==
If eligible, the top team in each group is promoted to Championnat National 2. If a team finishing top of the group is ineligible, or declines promotion, the next eligible team in that group is promoted.

This season a total of 37 teams will be relegated to Régional 1, as a result of the restructuring of the French leagues. This will result in teams finishing in the bottom three places being relegated, along with the four worst eleventh-placed clubs, calculated from results against the teams placed 5th to 10th in their group.

Reserve teams whose training centres are categorised as category 2B or lower cannot be promoted to Championnat National 2 by the rules of the competition.

== League tables ==
=== Group A ===
Pos	Team	Pld	W	D	L	GF	GA	GD	Pts	Promotion or relegation
1	Istres (P)	24	13	6	5	39	26	+13	45	Promotion to National 2
2	Montpellier (res)	24	11	8	5	47	28	+19	41	
3	Marseille (res)	24	10	7	7	32	33	−1	37	
4	Fos-sur-Mer	24	9	8	7	36	28	+8	35	
5	Agde	24	8	11	5	43	36	+7	35	
6	Lucciana	24	9	7	8	31	33	−2	34	
7	Corte	24	9	6	9	31	35	−4	33	
8	Beaucaire	24	7	11	6	37	29	+8	32	
9	Rousset	24	8	7	9	40	39	+1	31	
10	EUGA Ardziv	24	7	8	9	29	41	−12	29	
11	Cannet Rocheville	24	7	6	11	35	45	−10	27	
12	Cagnes-sur-Mer (R)	24	7	6	11	32	42	−10	27	Relegation to Regional 1
13	Montferrier-sur-Lez (R)	24	2	7	15	24	41	−17	13	Relegation to Regional 1

Updated to match(es) played on 22 May 2024. Source: soccerway
Rules for classification: 1) points; 2) head-to-head results; 3) head-to-head goal difference; 4) goal difference; 5) number of goals scored; 6) fair play points; 7) draw
(P) Promoted; (R) Relegated

=== Group B ===
Pos	Team	Pld	W	D	L	GF	GA	GD	Pts	Promotion or relegation
1	Anglet (P)	26	17	4	5	39	22	+17	55	Promotion to National 2
2	Blagnac	26	15	6	5	42	10	+32	51	
3	Castanet	26	13	9	4	40	23	+17	48	
4	Pau (res)	26	11	9	6	41	28	+13	42	
5	Colomiers (Note: The match between Colomiers and Pau (res) on 25 August 2023, which ended 2–0, was subject to a technical challenge. On review, it was found Colomiers had fielded two suspended players. Pau (res) were awarded the match 3–0 and Colomiers were penalised with the deduction of a point.)	26	11	8	7	29	27	+2	40	
6	Stade Bordelais	26	9	8	9	34	37	−3	35	
7	Canet Roussillon	26	9	7	10	26	28	−2	34	
8	Lège Cap Ferret	26	9	7	10	34	34	0	34	
9	Bayonne	26	9	6	11	36	33	+3	33	
10	Alberes Argelès	26	8	8	10	30	39	−9	32	
11	Onet-le-Château	26	8	6	12	35	39	−4	30	
12	Bordeaux (res)	26	6	11	9	33	33	0	29	
13	Saint-Paul-lès-Dax (R)	26	3	10	13	20	42	−22	19	Relegation to Regional 1
14	Saint-Estève (R)	26	1	7	18	21	65	−44	9	Relegation to Regional 1

Updated to match(es) played on 19 May 2024. Source: soccerway
Rules for classification: 1) points; 2) head-to-head results; 3) head-to-head goal difference; 4) goal difference; 5) number of goals scored; 6) fair play points; 7) draw
(P) Promoted; (R) Relegated

=== Group C ===
Pos	Team	Pld	W	D	L	GF	GA	GD	Pts	Promotion or relegation
1	Poitiers (P)	26	20	2	4	65	23	+42	62	Promotion to National 2
2	Montlouis-sur-Loire	26	19	4	3	47	17	+30	61	
3	Tours (Note: The match between Poitiers and Tours on 21 October 2023 was abandoned after 83 minutes, with the score 2–1, after incidents in the stands. On 14 December 2023, the disciplinary committee of the FFF awarded the match to Poitiers. On 18 February 2024 it was published that Tours' appeal was unsuccessful. Poitiers were awarded the match 3–0 and Tours were penalised with the deduction of a point.) (R)	26	15	4	7	57	29	+28	48	Administrative relegation to Regional 1
4	Ouest Tourangeau	26	15	1	10	46	36	+10	46	
5	Vierzon	26	10	7	9	46	41	+5	37	
6	Moulon Bourges	26	9	10	7	42	43	−1	37	
7	Châtellerault	26	10	6	10	37	42	−5	36	
8	Panazol (Note: The match between Panazol and Ouest Tourangeau on 27 August 2023, which ended 3–1, was subject to a technical challenge. On review, it was found Panazol had fielded an ineligible player. Ouest Tourangeau were awarded the match 3–0 and Panazol were penalised with the deduction of a point.)	26	10	6	10	44	43	+1	35	
9	Châteauroux (res)	26	10	2	14	35	35	0	32	
10	Chauvigny	26	8	6	12	34	48	−14	30	
11	Châteauneuf-sur-Loire	26	8	5	13	43	44	−1	29	
12	Vineuil	26	6	5	15	27	45	−18	23	
13	Bourges Foot 18 (res) (R)	26	6	6	14	38	59	−21	23	Relegation to Regional 1
14	Chambray	26	2	4	20	24	80	−56	−5	Relegation to Regional 1

Updated to match(es) played on 20 May 2024. Source: soccerway
Rules for classification: 1) points; 2) head-to-head results; 3) head-to-head goal difference; 4) goal difference; 5) number of goals scored; 6) fair play points; 7) draw
(P) Promoted; (R) Relegated

=== Group D ===
Pos	Team	Pld	W	D	L	GF	GA	GD	Pts	Promotion or relegation
1	Poiré-sur-Vie (P)	26	16	5	5	47	24	+23	53	Promotion to National 2
2	Nantes (res)	26	14	8	4	46	25	+21	50	
3	Vertou	26	13	11	2	44	28	+16	50	
4	Fontenay	26	13	9	4	49	25	+24	48	
5	Laval (res)	26	13	7	6	44	25	+19	46	
6	Saint-Philbert-de-Grand-Lieu	26	11	7	8	31	24	+7	40	
7	Sablé	26	9	9	8	43	45	−2	36	
8	Challans	26	8	9	9	40	34	+6	33	
9	La Châtaigneraie (R)	26	8	7	11	40	41	−1	31	Relegation to Regional 1
10	Chauray	26	8	6	12	32	34	−2	30	
11	Niort (res) (R)	26	8	3	15	34	45	−11	27	Relegation to Regional 1
12	Saint-Nazaire (R)	26	5	7	14	25	54	−29	22	Relegation to Regional 1
13	Les Sables-d'Olonne (R)	26	5	6	15	20	47	−27	21	Relegation to Regional 1
14	Château-Gontier	26	3	2	21	18	62	−44	11	Relegation to Regional 1

Updated to match(es) played on 22 May 2024. Source: soccerway
Rules for classification: 1) points; 2) head-to-head results; 3) head-to-head goal difference; 4) goal difference; 5) number of goals scored; 6) fair play points; 7) draw
(P) Promoted; (R) Relegated

=== Group E ===
Pos	Team	Pld	W	D	L	GF	GA	GD	Pts	Promotion or relegation
1	Saint-Colomban Locminé (P)	26	15	6	5	40	23	+17	51	Promotion to National 2
2	TA Rennes	26	14	6	6	56	33	+23	48	
3	Vitré	26	14	4	8	46	28	+18	46	
4	Rennes (res)	26	13	7	6	55	33	+22	46	
5	Milizac	26	11	10	5	41	29	+12	43	
6	Plabennec	26	12	3	11	49	49	0	39	
7	Lannion	26	11	4	11	35	35	0	37	
8	Pontivy	26	10	7	9	33	32	+1	37	
9	Ergué-Gabéric	26	9	5	12	32	41	−9	32	
10	Vannes	26	8	8	10	43	41	+2	32	
11	Fougères	26	7	8	11	46	49	−3	29	
12	Stade Briochin (res) (R)	26	7	5	14	27	49	−22	26	Relegation to Regional 1
13	Stade Pontivyen (R)	26	5	5	16	40	61	−21	20	Relegation to Regional 1
14	Cercle Paul Bert Bréquigny (R)	26	4	6	16	30	70	−40	18	Relegation to Regional 1

Updated to match(es) played on 22 May 2024. Source: soccerway
Rules for classification: 1) points; 2) head-to-head results; 3) head-to-head goal difference; 4) goal difference; 5) number of goals scored; 6) fair play points; 7) draw
(P) Promoted; (R) Relegated

=== Group F ===
Pos	Team	Pld	W	D	L	GF	GA	GD	Pts	Promotion or relegation
1	Houlgate (P)	26	16	4	6	47	35	+12	52	Promotion to National 2
2	Alençon	26	14	8	4	45	31	+14	50	
3	Chatou	26	13	5	8	39	29	+10	44	
4	SM Caen (res)	26	11	6	9	44	35	+9	39	
5	Saint-Lô	26	11	5	10	37	34	+3	38	
6	Dives-Cabourg	26	10	6	10	35	36	−1	36	
7	ASPTT Caen	26	8	11	7	30	26	+4	35	
8	Dieppe	26	10	4	12	33	36	−3	34	
9	Flers	26	8	9	9	40	46	−6	33	
10	AG Caen	26	10	2	14	40	52	−12	32	
11	Oissel	26	8	7	11	32	34	−2	31	
12	Le Havre (res) (R)	26	7	8	11	32	39	−7	29	Relegation to Regional 1
13	Quevilly-Rouen (res) (R)	26	7	5	14	28	40	−12	26	Relegation to Regional 1
14	Les Mureaux (R)	26	7	4	15	29	38	−9	25	Relegation to Regional 1

Updated to match(es) played on 22 May 2024. Source: soccerway
Rules for classification: 1) points; 2) head-to-head results; 3) head-to-head goal difference; 4) goal difference; 5) number of goals scored; 6) fair play points; 7) draw
(P) Promoted; (R) Relegated

=== Group G ===
Pos	Team	Pld	W	D	L	GF	GA	GD	Pts	Promotion or relegation
1	Chantilly (P)	26	13	9	4	47	27	+20	48	Promotion to National 2
2	Lille (res)	26	13	8	5	46	29	+17	47	
3	Lens (res)	26	13	7	6	43	26	+17	46	
4	Pays de Cassel	26	14	2	10	46	34	+12	44	
5	Croix	26	11	8	7	37	27	+10	41	
6	Vimy	26	11	5	10	40	45	−5	38	
7	Sannois-Saint-Gratien	26	9	10	7	32	30	+2	37	
8	Saint-Ouen-l'Aumône	26	10	5	11	30	31	−1	35	
9	Pays du Valois	26	10	4	12	36	43	−7	34	
10	Drancy	26	7	12	7	33	29	+4	33	
11	Valenciennes (res)	26	7	8	11	34	42	−8	29	
12	Marcq-en-Barœul (R)	26	8	4	14	33	51	−18	28	Relegation to Regional 1
13	Compiègne (R)	26	5	6	15	30	59	−29	20	Relegation to Regional 1
14	Saint-Amand-les-Eaux (R)	26	4	6	16	23	37	−14	18	Relegation to Regional 1

Updated to match(es) played on 22 May 2024. Source: soccerway
Rules for classification: 1) points; 2) head-to-head results; 3) head-to-head goal difference; 4) goal difference; 5) number of goals scored; 6) fair play points; 7) draw
(P) Promoted; (R) Relegated

=== Group H ===
Pos	Team	Pld	W	D	L	GF	GA	GD	Pts	Promotion or relegation
1	FC Balagne (P)	26	17	5	4	51	24	+27	56	Promotion to National 2
2	Sainte-Geneviève	26	15	9	2	47	15	+32	54	
3	Linas-Montlhéry	26	12	9	5	42	30	+12	45	
4	Saint-Maur	26	13	6	7	38	25	+13	44	
5	Brétigny	26	12	8	6	44	24	+20	44	
6	AC Ajaccio (res)	26	8	9	9	24	31	−7	33	
7	Ivry (Note: The match between Sainte-Geneviève and Ivry on 3 February 2024 was abandoned in stoppage time after Sainte-Geneviève were awarded a goal by the referee. Ivry protested that the ball had not entered the goal, and did not restart the match. The referee eventually blew the whistle to stop the game and Ivry placed a technical challenge. On 14 February 2024 it was published that the FFF had penalised Ivry, awarded the match to Sainte-Geneviève by the scoreline of 3–0, and deducted a point from Ivry.)	25	9	7	9	35	34	+1	33	
8	Orléans (res) (Note: The match between FC Balagne and Orléans (res) on 21 October 2023 did not take place, due to Orléans (res) not having booked plane tickets to Corsica. On 9 November 2023, it was published that the FFF had declared the match forfeit by Orléans, and awarded the tie to Balagne by the standard forfeit scoreline of 3–0, penalising Orléans (res) by deducting a point. Orléans (res) were penalised in another match, against Montrouge, after the game which was scheduled for 13 January 2024 had to be postponed due to faulty floodlights, and lack of staff to repair them. The match was awarded to Montrouge by the scoreline of 0–3 and Orléans (res) were deducted another penalty point.)	25	7	11	7	26	32	−6	30	
9	Neuilly-sur-Marne	26	6	11	9	29	36	−7	29	
10	SC Bastia (res)	26	5	12	9	34	26	+8	27	
11	Montrouge (R)	26	6	7	13	28	39	−11	25	Administrative relegation to Regional 1
12	Vitry-sur-Seine (R)	26	5	8	13	23	49	−26	23	Relegation to Regional 1
13	Saran (R)	26	5	9	12	25	36	−11	22	Relegation to Regional 1
14	Mainvilliers (R)	26	3	7	16	16	61	−45	15	Relegation to Regional 1

Updated to match(es) played on 22 May 2024. Source: soccerway
Rules for classification: 1) points; 2) head-to-head results; 3) head-to-head goal difference; 4) goal difference; 5) number of goals scored; 6) fair play points; 7) draw
(P) Promoted; (R) Relegated

=== Group I ===
Pos	Team	Pld	W	D	L	GF	GA	GD	Pts	Promotion or relegation
1	Thionville (P)	26	17	4	5	53	28	+25	55	Promotion to National 2
2	Reims (res)	26	14	6	6	64	40	+24	48	
3	ESTAC Troyes (res)	26	15	2	9	48	40	+8	47	
4	Thaon	26	10	9	7	39	35	+4	39	
5	Reims Sainte-Anne (R)	26	10	6	10	31	34	−3	36	Administrative relegation to Regional 1
6	Metz (res)	26	10	5	11	44	36	+8	35	
7	Sarre-Union	26	9	8	9	46	45	+1	35	
8	Strasbourg Koenigshoffen	26	10	4	12	30	33	−3	34	
9	Prix-lès-Mézières	26	10	6	10	34	33	+1	33	
10	Belfort	26	8	8	10	35	45	−10	32	
11	Raon-l'Étape	26	9	5	12	36	48	−12	32	
12	RC Strasbourg (res)	26	8	6	12	37	43	−6	30	
13	Nancy (res) (R)	26	9	8	9	35	36	−1	29	Relegation to Regional 1
14	FC Métropole Troyenne (R)	26	3	3	20	22	58	−36	12	Relegation to Regional 1

Updated to match(es) played on 18 May 2024. Source: soccerway
Rules for classification: 1) points; 2) head-to-head results; 3) head-to-head goal difference; 4) goal difference; 5) number of goals scored; 6) fair play points; 7) draw
(P) Promoted; (R) Relegated

=== Group J ===
Pos	Team	Pld	W	D	L	GF	GA	GD	Pts	Promotion or relegation
1	Rumilly-Vallières (P)	26	17	7	2	54	22	+32	58	Promotion to National 2
2	Pontarlier	26	11	12	3	50	31	+19	45	
3	Sochaux (res)	26	13	6	7	35	28	+7	45	
4	Dijon (res)	26	11	7	8	44	30	+14	40	
5	Jura Dolois	26	12	3	11	37	33	+4	39	
6	Besançon Football	26	10	7	9	37	38	−1	37	
7	Cosne-sur-Loire	26	9	9	8	38	35	+3	36	
8	Moulins Yzeure	26	9	8	9	23	35	−12	35	
9	Louhans-Cuiseaux	26	9	7	10	37	28	+9	34	
10	Gueugnon	26	10	4	12	30	32	−2	34	
11	ASPTT Dijon	26	8	7	11	28	43	−15	31	
12	Vesoul (R)	26	7	4	15	32	45	−13	25	Relegation to Regional 1
13	Is-Selongey (R)	26	4	11	11	33	47	−14	23	Relegation to Regional 1
14	La Chapelle-de-Guinchay (R)	26	3	6	17	25	56	−31	15	Relegation to Regional 1

Updated to match(es) played on 22 May 2024. Source: soccerway
Rules for classification: 1) points; 2) head-to-head results; 3) head-to-head goal difference; 4) goal difference; 5) number of goals scored; 6) fair play points; 7) draw
(P) Promoted; (R) Relegated

=== Group K ===
Pos	Team	Pld	W	D	L	GF	GA	GD	Pts	Promotion or relegation
1	Saint-Priest (P)	26	17	4	5	57	25	+32	55	Promotion to National 2
2	Lyon La Duchère	26	13	9	4	45	25	+20	48	
3	Chambéry	26	13	9	4	34	18	+16	48	
4	Saint-Étienne (res)	26	12	5	9	36	31	+5	41	
5	Espaly-Saint-Marcel	26	11	5	10	32	28	+4	38	
6	Olympique Lyonnais (res)	26	11	5	10	38	44	−6	38	
7	Limonest	26	10	7	9	37	38	−1	37	
8	Feurs (R)	26	10	7	9	39	35	+4	37	Administrative relegation to Regional 1
9	Clermont (res)	26	10	3	13	38	37	+1	33	
10	Hauts Lyonnais	26	9	5	12	30	44	−14	32	
11	Chassieu	26	6	9	11	23	34	−11	27	
12	Valence (R)	26	5	9	12	31	39	−8	24	Relegation to Regional 1
13	Ain Sud	26	4	11	11	31	42	−11	23	Relegation to Regional 1
14	Vaulx-en-Velin (R)	26	4	6	16	21	52	−31	18	Relegation to Regional 1

Updated to match(es) played on 22 May 2024. Source: soccerway
Rules for classification: 1) points; 2) head-to-head results; 3) head-to-head goal difference; 4) goal difference; 5) number of goals scored; 6) fair play points; 7) draw
(P) Promoted; (R) Relegated

== Season outcomes ==
=== Promotion ===
Istres, Anglet, Poitiers, Poiré-sur-Vie, Saint-Colomban Locminé, Houlgate, Chantilly, FC Balagne, Thionville, Rumilly-Vallières and Saint-Priest were champions of each group, and were promoted to 2023–24 Championnat National 2.

=== Relegation ===
A total of 34 teams were relegated :

- Group A

Cagnes-sur-Mer, Montferrier-sur-Lez

- Group B

Saint-Paul-lès-Dax, Saint-Estève

- Group C

Tours (administrative relegation), Bourges Foot 18 (res), Chambray

- Group D

Niort (res), Saint-Nazaire, Les Sables-d'Olonne, Château-Gontier

- Group E

Stade Briochin (res), Stade Pontivyen, Cercle Paul Bert Bréquigny

- Group F

Le Havre (res), Quevilly-Rouen (res), Les Mureaux

- Group G

Marcq-en-Barœul, Compiègne, Saint-Amand-les-Eaux

- Group H

Montrouge (administrative relegation), Vitry-sur-Seine, Saran, Mainvilliers

- Group I

Reims Sainte-Anne (administrative relegation), Nancy (res), FC Métropole Troyenne

- Group J

Vesoul, Is-Selongey, La Chapelle-de-Guinchay

- Group K

Feurs (administrative relegation), Valence, Ain Sud, Vaulx-en-Velin
