= 2020–21 Championnat National 3 =

Championnat National 3
- Season: 2020–21
- Dates: 29 August 2020 – 24 March 2021
- Champions: None
- Promoted: None
- Relegated: None
- Top goalscorer: 8 goals Mustapha Sangaré, Racing Club
- Biggest home win: Vitré 6–0 Guipry Messac; Group K, Round 2, 5 September 2020; Gueugnon 6–0 Valdahon-Vercel; Group E, Round 3, 12 September 2020; Dives-Cabourg 6–0 Romilly; Group J, Round 6, 24 October 2020; Amiens SC (res) 7–1 Chantilly; Group I, Round 6, 25 October 2020
- Biggest away win: Paron 0–6 Jura Dolois; Group E, Round 3, 13 September 2020
- Highest scoring: Rousset 4–4 Cannet Rocheville; Group D, Round 2, 5 September 2020; Ain Sud 4–4 Hauts Lyonnais; Group M, Round 5, 26 September 2020

The 2020–21 Championnat National 3 was the fourth season of the fifth tier in the French football league system in its current format. The competition was contested by 168 clubs split geographically across 12 groups of 14 teams. The teams included amateur clubs (although a few were semi-professional) and the reserve teams of professional clubs.

After a suspension starting in October 2020, the season was declared void by the FFF on 24 March 2021 due to the ongoing COVID-19 pandemic in France, with some teams having played just three games.

== Teams ==
On 17 July 2020, the French Football Federation ratified the constitution of the competition, and published the groups as follows:

- 120 teams that were not relegated or promoted from the 2019–20 Championnat National 3 groups.
- 11 teams relegated from 2019–20 Championnat National 2 after any reprieves.
- 1 team reprieved from relegation from 2019–20 Championnat National 3 groups.
- 36 teams promoted from Régional 1 leagues (as shown in the table below).

Teams promoted to Championnat National 3
Region	Team	Method of qualification
Nouvelle-Aquitaine	Neuville	R1A champions
Nouvelle-Aquitaine	Libourne	R1B champions
Nouvelle-Aquitaine	Tartas	R1C champions
Pays de la Loire	Poiré-sur-Vie	R1A champions
Pays de la Loire	Sautron	R1A runners up
Pays de la Loire	Saint-Philbert-de-Grand-Lieu	R2A champions
Centre-Val de Loire	Déols	R1 runners up (Note: R1 champions Blois (res) ineligible, due to the first team being in Championnat National 2)
Centre-Val de Loire	Amilly	R1 third
Centre-Val de Loire	Saint-Jean-le-Blanc	R1 fourth
Méditerranée-Corsica	Corte	R1 Corsica champions
Méditerranée-Corsica	Cannet Rocheville	R1 Méditerranée champions
Méditerranée-Corsica	Rousset	R1 Méditerranée runners up
Bourgogne-Franche-Comté	Saint-Apollinaire	R1A champions
Bourgogne-Franche-Comté	Grandvillars	R1B runners up (Note: R1B champions Pontarlier (res) ineligible, due to the first team being in Championnat National 3)
Bourgogne-Franche-Comté	Paron	R1A runners up
Grand Est	Épernay	R1A champions
Grand Est	Nancy (res)	R1B champions
Grand Est	Colmar	R1C champions
Occitanie	Castanet	R1A runners up (Note: R1A champions Colomiers (res) ineligible, due to the first team being in Championnat National 2)
Occitanie	Narbonne	R1B champions
Occitanie	Alberes Argelès	R1C champions
Hauts-de-France	Wasquehal	R1A champions
Hauts-de-France	Chantilly	R1B champions
Hauts-de-France	Saint-Omer	R1B runners up (best runner up on PPG)
Normandy	Bayeux	R1A runners up (Note: R1A champions Granville (res) ineligible, due to the first team being in Championnat National 2)
Normandy	Romilly	R1B runners up (Note: R1B champions Rouen (res) ineligible, due to the first team being in Championnat National 2)
Normandy	Dives-Cabourg	R1A third (Note: Mesnil-Esnard-Franqueville were best third placed team on PPG, but lost an appeal after the Ligue de Football de Normandie controversially promoted Dives-Cabourg.)
Brittany	Milizac	R1A champions
Brittany	Guipry Messac	R1B champions
Brittany	Saint-Brieuc (res)	R1B runners up (best runner up on PPG)
Paris Île-de-France	Meaux Academy	R1A champions
Paris Île-de-France	Linas-Montlhéry	R1B champions
Paris Île-de-France	Brétigny	R1B runners up
Auvergne-Rhône-Alpes	Moulins	R1A champions
Auvergne-Rhône-Alpes	Thonon Évian	R1B champions
Auvergne-Rhône-Alpes	Velay	R1A runners up

On 27 July 2020, the Appeals committee of the DNCG confirmed that Athlético Marseille would be allowed to play in Championnat National 2, thus temporarily leaving a vacant place in Group D. Three days later, the disciplinary committee of the FFF announced that they were demoting the club back to National 3, due to the production of fraudulent documentation at the end of the 2018–19 season.

== Promotion and relegation ==
If eligible, the top team in each group is promoted to Championnat National 2. If a team finishing top of the group is ineligible, or declines promotion, the next eligible team in that group is promoted.

Generally, three teams are relegated from each group to their respective top regional league, subject to reprieves. Extra teams are relegated from a group if more than one team is relegated to that group from Championnat National 2. In the case that no teams are relegated to a group from Championnat National 2, one less team is relegated from that group to the regional league.

Reserve teams whose training centres are categorised as category 2B or lower cannot be promoted to Championnat National 2 by the rules of the competition.

== Impacts of COVID-19 on the competition ==
On 28 October 2020, French President Emmanuel Macron announced a second COVID-19 lockdown, including the suspension of all amateur football, for four weeks. The following day, the FFF confirmed the suspension of senior football at all levels below Championnat National. By this point in the competition, more than 60 games had been postponed due to positive covid cases impacting one or both teams.

On 24 March 2021, the COMEX (Executive Committee) of the FFF announced end of all amateur championships below Championnat National 2, including Championnat National 3, due to the ongoing COVID-19 situation. The announcement also confirmed no promotions or relegations would take place, with the season void.

== League tables ==
The league standings are a record of the games that took place before the competition was declared void.

=== Group A: Nouvelle-Aquitaine ===
Pos	Team	Pld	W	D	L	GF	GA	GD	Pts
1	Stade Bordelais	5	5	0	0	15	1	+14	15
2	Lège Cap Ferret	5	3	2	0	12	7	+5	11
3	Neuville	6	3	2	1	6	3	+3	11
4	Libourne	4	2	2	0	5	3	+2	8
5	Tartas	6	2	2	2	8	9	−1	8
6	Anglet	5	2	0	3	5	6	−1	6
7	Poitiers	4	1	3	0	4	2	+2	6
8	Cognac	6	1	3	2	6	13	−7	6
9	Niort (res)	4	1	1	2	6	6	0	4
10	Bressuire	5	1	1	3	3	6	−3	4
11	Châtellerault	5	1	1	3	3	7	−4	4
12	Bayonne	3	1	0	2	4	3	+1	3
13	Chauvigny	5	0	2	3	3	9	−6	2
14	Bordeaux (res)	3	0	1	2	1	6	−5	1

Updated to match(es) played on 25 October 2020. Source:
Rules for classification: 1) points; 2) head-to-head results; 3) head-to-head goal difference; 4) goal difference; 5) number of goals scored; 6) fair play points; 7) draw

=== Group B: Pays de la Loire ===
Pos	Team	Pld	W	D	L	GF	GA	GD	Pts
1	La Roche	4	4	0	0	9	2	+7	12
2	Changé	5	3	2	0	9	2	+7	11
3	Saumur	5	2	2	1	9	5	+4	8
4	Fontenay	5	2	2	1	7	6	+1	8
5	Laval (res)	5	2	2	1	7	4	+3	8
6	Challans	3	2	1	0	4	2	+2	7
7	Vertou	5	2	0	3	6	9	−3	6
8	Sautron	6	2	0	4	6	7	−1	6
9	Poiré-sur-Vie	3	1	2	0	3	2	+1	5
10	Sablé	3	1	1	1	6	5	+1	4
11	Saint-Philbert-de-Grand-Lieu	5	1	1	3	7	14	−7	4
12	Pouzauges	4	0	2	2	4	9	−5	2
13	Le Mans (res)	5	0	2	3	2	7	−5	2
14	La Châtaigneraie	4	0	1	3	3	8	−5	1

Updated to match(es) played on 24 October 2020. Source:
Rules for classification: 1) points; 2) head-to-head results; 3) head-to-head goal difference; 4) goal difference; 5) number of goals scored; 6) fair play points; 7) draw

=== Group C: Centre-Val de Loire ===
Pos	Team	Pld	W	D	L	GF	GA	GD	Pts
1	Saran	6	3	3	0	11	5	+6	12
2	Vierzon	5	3	1	1	10	5	+5	10
3	Avoine Chinon	5	3	0	2	7	4	+3	9
4	Chartres (res)	6	2	2	2	6	9	−3	8
5	Amilly	5	2	2	1	9	7	+2	8
6	Tours	5	2	2	1	7	5	+2	8
7	Châteauneuf-sur-Loire	6	1	5	0	5	4	+1	8
8	Orléans (res)	6	2	2	2	11	10	+1	8
9	Châteauroux (res)	6	2	2	2	4	5	−1	8
10	Montlouis-sur-Loire	6	2	1	3	5	6	−1	7
11	Ouest Tourangeau (Note: Ouest Tourangeau were deducted a point for an as yet unpublished reason.)	5	2	2	1	4	5	−1	7
12	Saint-Jean-le-Blanc	6	1	3	2	6	9	−3	6
13	Montargis	5	1	0	4	5	8	−3	3
14	Déols	6	0	1	5	8	16	−8	1

Updated to match(es) played on 25 October 2020. Source:
Rules for classification: 1) points; 2) head-to-head results; 3) head-to-head goal difference; 4) goal difference; 5) number of goals scored; 6) fair play points; 7) draw

=== Group D: Provence-Alpes-Côte d'Azur-Corsica ===
Pos	Team	Pld	W	D	L	GF	GA	GD	Pts
1	Furiani-Agliani	5	4	1	0	11	6	+5	13
2	Istres	6	4	1	1	10	7	+3	13
3	Saint-Jean Beaulieu	6	3	1	2	8	4	+4	10
4	Cannes	5	3	1	1	8	5	+3	10
5	Côte Bleue	6	2	2	2	14	11	+3	8
6	Lucciana	5	2	2	1	5	2	+3	8
7	Nice (res)	6	2	2	2	11	7	+4	8
8	Cannet Rocheville	6	2	1	3	11	13	−2	7
9	Rousset	6	2	1	3	6	9	−3	7
10	Athlético Marseille (Note: The match between Athlético Marseille and Endoume Marseille on 30 September 2020 was abandoned after 89 minutes when Endoume Marseille were reduced to less than 8 players. The scoreline at the time was 6–1. Endoume Marseille will likely be penalised in due course.)	4	2	1	1	7	5	+2	7
11	AC Ajaccio (res)	5	2	0	3	5	9	−4	6
12	Corte	6	1	1	4	6	13	−7	4
13	Mandelieu	6	0	3	3	4	10	−6	3
14	Endoume Marseille	4	0	1	3	6	11	−5	1

Updated to match(es) played on 25 October 2020. Source:
Rules for classification: 1) points; 2) head-to-head results; 3) head-to-head goal difference; 4) goal difference; 5) number of goals scored; 6) fair play points; 7) draw

=== Group E: Bourgogne-Franche-Comté ===
Pos	Team	Pld	W	D	L	GF	GA	GD	Pts
1	Racing Besançon	6	5	0	1	13	5	+8	15
2	Jura Dolois	5	3	2	0	12	3	+9	11
3	Gueugnon	5	3	1	1	11	6	+5	10
4	Dijon (res)	6	2	4	0	8	5	+3	10
5	Pontarlier	5	3	1	1	9	5	+4	10
6	Besançon Football	6	2	2	2	10	7	+3	8
7	Sochaux (res)	5	2	2	1	6	5	+1	8
8	Morteau-Montlebon	5	2	1	2	5	4	+1	7
9	Is-Selongey	5	2	1	2	7	8	−1	7
10	Grandvillars	5	1	1	3	3	8	−5	4
11	Saint-Apollinaire	5	1	1	3	6	9	−3	4
12	Montceau	4	1	1	2	3	6	−3	4
13	Valdahon-Vercel	5	0	1	4	2	13	−11	1
14	Paron	5	0	0	5	1	12	−11	0

Updated to match(es) played on 24 October 2020. Source:
Rules for classification: 1) points; 2) head-to-head results; 3) head-to-head goal difference; 4) goal difference; 5) number of goals scored; 6) fair play points; 7) draw

=== Group F: Grand Est ===
Pos	Team	Pld	W	D	L	GF	GA	GD	Pts
1	Biesheim	7	5	2	0	16	5	+11	17
2	Thaon	7	5	1	1	14	6	+8	16
3	Colmar	7	3	2	2	13	10	+3	11
4	Sarre-Union	6	3	1	2	12	10	+2	10
5	Mulhouse	6	3	1	2	9	8	+1	10
6	St-Louis Neuweg	7	2	3	2	12	12	0	9
7	Nancy (res)	7	3	0	4	9	15	−6	9
8	Épernay	6	2	1	3	7	6	+1	7
9	Illkirch-Graffenstaden	6	2	1	3	7	12	−5	7
10	Prix-lès-Mézières	7	2	1	4	9	11	−2	7
11	Raon-l'Étape (Note: The match between Raon-l'Étape and Épernay on 10 October 2020 was postponed after the goals were found to be too small. A challenge was lodged by Épernay. The Ligue du Grand-Est penalised Raon-l'Étape, awarding the match to Épernay 3–0 and deducting a penalty point from Raon-l'Étape.)	7	2	1	4	5	11	−6	6
12	RC Strasbourg (res)	6	1	3	2	9	10	−1	6
13	ESTAC Troyes (res)	6	1	3	2	5	6	−1	6
14	Amnéville	7	1	2	4	6	11	−5	5

Updated to match(es) played on 25 October 2020. Source:
Rules for classification: 1) points; 2) head-to-head results; 3) head-to-head goal difference; 4) goal difference; 5) number of goals scored; 6) fair play points; 7) draw

=== Group H: Occitanie ===
Pos	Team	Pld	W	D	L	GF	GA	GD	Pts
1	Castanet	6	3	3	0	9	4	+5	12
2	Montpellier (res)	6	3	2	1	12	8	+4	11
3	Agde	5	3	2	0	8	5	+3	11
4	Stade Beaucairois	6	2	4	0	10	7	+3	10
5	Blagnac	6	3	1	2	6	7	−1	10
6	Rodez (res)	6	2	2	2	9	11	−2	8
7	Alès	6	2	1	3	11	11	0	7
8	Balma	6	2	1	3	7	12	−5	7
9	Nîmes (res)	6	2	1	3	8	10	−2	7
10	Toulouse (res)	5	2	0	3	13	10	+3	6
11	Alberes Argelès	6	1	3	2	9	7	+2	6
12	Fabrègues	6	2	0	4	11	13	−2	6
13	Muret	6	1	2	3	4	9	−5	5
14	Narbonne	6	1	2	3	4	7	−3	5

Updated to match(es) played on 25 October 2020. Source:
Rules for classification: 1) points; 2) head-to-head results; 3) head-to-head goal difference; 4) goal difference; 5) number of goals scored; 6) fair play points; 7) draw

=== Group I: Hauts-de-France ===
Pos	Team	Pld	W	D	L	GF	GA	GD	Pts
1	Wasquehal	5	4	1	0	11	6	+5	13
2	Olympique Marcquois	4	3	0	1	7	3	+4	9
3	Maubeuge	6	2	2	2	8	9	−1	8
4	Vimy	5	2	2	1	7	6	+1	8
5	Croix	5	2	2	1	6	3	+3	8
6	Le Touquet	4	2	1	1	4	3	+1	7
7	Amiens SC (res)	6	2	1	3	13	12	+1	7
8	Chantilly	5	2	1	2	13	14	−1	7
9	Boulogne (res)	5	2	1	2	9	12	−3	7
10	Valenciennes (res)	4	2	0	2	6	4	+2	6
11	Lille (res)	4	2	0	2	7	9	−2	6
12	Saint-Omer	6	1	3	2	8	9	−1	6
13	Feignies Aulnoye	5	0	4	1	8	9	−1	4
14	AC Amiens	6	0	0	6	4	12	−8	0

Updated to match(es) played on 25 October 2020. Source:
Rules for classification: 1) points; 2) head-to-head results; 3) head-to-head goal difference; 4) goal difference; 5) number of goals scored; 6) fair play points; 7) draw

=== Group J: Normandy ===
Pos	Team	Pld	W	D	L	GF	GA	GD	Pts
1	AG Caen	6	5	0	1	16	5	+11	15
2	Dives-Cabourg	6	5	0	1	16	6	+10	15
3	Oissel	5	3	2	0	10	5	+5	11
4	Saint-Lô	6	3	2	1	11	7	+4	11
5	Dieppe	6	2	3	1	8	7	+1	9
6	Avranches (res)	6	3	0	3	7	7	0	9
7	Alençon	6	2	2	2	9	8	+1	8
8	Cherbourg	6	2	2	2	8	8	0	8
9	Vire	5	2	1	2	7	8	−1	7
10	Le Havre (res)	5	1	3	1	7	7	0	6
11	Évreux	6	2	0	4	7	9	−2	6
12	Romilly	4	1	0	3	3	13	−10	3
13	Bayeux	6	0	1	5	6	15	−9	1
14	Quevilly-Rouen (res)	5	0	0	5	3	13	−10	0

Updated to match(es) played on 24 October 2020. Source:
Rules for classification: 1) points; 2) head-to-head results; 3) head-to-head goal difference; 4) goal difference; 5) number of goals scored; 6) fair play points; 7) draw

=== Group K: Brittany ===
Pos	Team	Pld	W	D	L	GF	GA	GD	Pts
1	Pontivy	6	6	0	0	17	2	+15	18
2	Rennes (res)	6	4	2	0	11	7	+4	14
3	Vitré	6	4	1	1	11	3	+8	13
4	Dinan-Léhon	6	4	0	2	10	5	+5	12
5	Milizac	6	4	0	2	10	6	+4	12
6	Saint-Brieuc (res)	6	3	1	2	12	7	+5	10
7	Saint-Colomban Locminé	5	2	2	1	7	6	+1	8
8	Brest (res)	5	2	1	2	5	9	−4	7
9	Guipry Messac	6	2	0	4	7	14	−7	6
10	Plouzané	6	1	1	4	4	8	−4	4
11	Lannion	5	1	0	4	5	12	−7	3
12	Stade Pontivyen	6	1	0	5	2	9	−7	3
13	TA Rennes	6	1	0	5	6	15	−9	3
14	Fougères	5	1	0	4	5	9	−4	3

Updated to match(es) played on 24 October 2020. Source:
Rules for classification: 1) points; 2) head-to-head results; 3) head-to-head goal difference; 4) goal difference; 5) number of goals scored; 6) fair play points; 7) draw

=== Group L: Île-de-France ===
Pos	Team	Pld	W	D	L	GF	GA	GD	Pts
1	Racing Club	6	5	1	0	14	5	+9	16
2	Aubervilliers	6	4	1	1	11	6	+5	13
3	Ivry	6	4	1	1	10	5	+5	13
4	Créteil (res)	6	3	2	1	10	6	+4	11
5	Paris Saint-Germain (res)	6	3	0	3	5	6	−1	9
6	Les Ulis	5	3	0	2	8	5	+3	9
7	Linas-Montlhéry	6	3	0	3	9	7	+2	9
8	Drancy	6	2	2	2	8	6	+2	8
9	Paris FC (res)	6	2	2	2	8	8	0	8
10	Mantes	6	1	2	3	5	9	−4	5
11	Brétigny	6	1	1	4	6	10	−4	4
12	Blanc-Mesnil	5	1	1	3	2	5	−3	4
13	Meaux Academy	6	1	1	4	4	11	−7	4
14	Les Mureaux	6	0	2	4	3	14	−11	2

Updated to match(es) played on 24 October 2020. Source:
Rules for classification: 1) points; 2) head-to-head results; 3) head-to-head goal difference; 4) goal difference; 5) number of goals scored; 6) fair play points; 7) draw

=== Group M: Auvergne-Rhône-Alpes ===
Pos	Team	Pld	W	D	L	GF	GA	GD	Pts
1	Bourgoin-Jallieu	6	3	2	1	14	10	+4	11
2	Ain Sud	6	3	2	1	15	12	+3	11
3	Sporting Club Lyon (res)	5	3	1	1	11	7	+4	10
4	Limonest	6	3	1	2	8	6	+2	10
5	Hauts Lyonnais	5	2	2	1	13	12	+1	8
6	Thonon Évian	5	2	2	1	10	6	+4	8
7	Saint-Étienne (res)	5	2	1	2	12	11	+1	7
8	Vaulx-en-Velin	5	2	1	2	7	6	+1	7
9	Chambéry	5	2	0	3	8	12	−4	6
10	Aurillac	5	2	0	3	6	10	−4	6
11	Clermont (res)	6	1	2	3	9	11	−2	5
12	Moulins	6	1	2	3	6	10	−4	5
13	Velay	4	1	1	2	5	7	−2	4
14	Montluçon	5	1	1	3	4	8	−4	4

Updated to match(es) played on 24 October 2020. Source:
Rules for classification: 1) points; 2) head-to-head results; 3) head-to-head goal difference; 4) goal difference; 5) number of goals scored; 6) fair play points; 7) draw

== Top scorers ==
As of 28 October 2020.

Rank	Player	Club	Goals
1	(France) Mustapha Sangaré	Racing Club	8
2	(France) El Hadji Malick Seck	Stade Bordelais	7
2	(France) Belkacem Dali-Amar	Côte Bleue	7
4	(France) Sullivan Martinet	Stade Bordelais	6
4	(France) Thomas Alvarez	Saran	6
4	(France) Rodney Mazikou	Amilly	6
4	(France) Alain Reppert	Biesheim	6
4	(France) Moustapha Ouabi	Fabrègues	6
4	(France) Christopher Formy	Vitré	6
4	(Cameroon) Christian Toko	Hauts Lyonnais	6
