= 2024–25 Championnat National 2 =

Championnat National 2
- Season: 2024–25
- Dates: 16 August 2024 – 17 May 2025
- Promoted: Le Puy; Stade Briochin; Fleury
- Relegated: Anglet; Jura Sud; Villers-Houlgate; Aubervilliers; Poiré-sur-Vie

The 2024–25 Championnat National 2 was the 27th season of the fourth tier in the French football league system in its current format. This season the competition was contested by 48 clubs split geographically across three groups of 16 teams. A total of 11 clubs were promoted from Championnat National 3 and four were relegated from Championnat National, the tier above. The previous season had 56 clubs in four groups with five relegated clubs each; the reduction in teams was part of a restructuring of the French football league system between 2022 and 2026.

The teams included amateur clubs (although a few were semi-professional) and the reserve teams of professional clubs. On 1 August 2024, FC Girondins de Bordeaux was relegated from Ligue 2 directly to Championnat National 2 due to being placed in financial administration.

== Teams ==
Location of teams in 2024–25 National 2

== League tables ==
=== Group A ===
Pos	Team	Pld	W	D	L	GF	GA	GD	Pts	Promotion or relegation
1	Le Puy (C, P)	30	17	8	5	48	17	+31	59	Promotion to National
2	Cannes	30	15	10	5	57	30	+27	55	
3	Toulon	30	13	9	8	44	35	+9	48	
4	Grasse	30	11	12	7	40	29	+11	45	
5	Hyères	30	11	12	7	34	25	+9	45	
6	Angoulême	30	10	13	7	28	28	0	43	
7	Saint-Priest	30	11	9	10	32	33	−1	42	
8	Fréjus Saint-Raphaël	30	9	12	9	33	36	−3	38 (Note: Fréjus Saint-Raphaël were deducted one point.)	
9	Istres	30	11	5	14	40	48	−8	38	
10	Rumilly-Vallières	30	8	13	9	35	35	0	37	
11	Andrézieux	30	9	10	11	36	29	+7	37	
12	Marignane GCB (D, R)	30	9	8	13	29	43	−14	35	Demoted to Régional 1
13	Bergerac (D, R)	30	9	7	14	34	49	−15	34	Demoted to Régional 3
14	GOAL FC	30	10	6	14	33	53	−20	32 (Note: GOAL FC were deducted six points. The deduction was then reduced to four points.)	Spared from relegation
15	Jura Sud (R)	30	5	14	11	28	36	−8	29	Relegation to National 3
16	Anglet (R)	30	4	8	18	25	50	−25	20	Relegation to National 3

Source: soccerway
Rules for classification: 1) points; 2) head-to-head results; 3) head-to-head goal difference; 4) goal difference; 5) number of goals scored; 6) fair play points; 7) draw
(C) Champions; (D) Disqualified; (P) Promoted; (R) Relegated

=== Group B ===
Pos	Team	Pld	W	D	L	GF	GA	GD	Pts	Promotion or relegation
1	Stade Briochin (C, P)	30	18	5	7	49	34	+15	59	Promotion to National
2	Les Herbiers	30	16	7	7	53	24	+29	55	
3	Saint-Malo	30	14	11	5	43	27	+16	53	
4	Bordeaux	30	14	6	10	38	32	+6	48	
5	La Roche	30	13	9	8	42	27	+15	48	
6	Blois	30	13	8	9	46	36	+10	47	
7	Saint-Colomban Locminé	30	13	7	10	39	33	+6	46	
8	Bourges	30	10	11	9	46	43	+3	41	
9	Avranches	30	11	8	11	46	43	+3	41	
10	Dinan Léhon	30	10	8	12	38	49	−11	38	
11	Châteaubriant	30	9	10	11	36	43	−7	37	
12	Saint-Pryvé Saint-Hilaire	30	9	9	12	40	37	+3	36	
13	Poitiers	30	8	9	13	36	48	−12	33	
14	Granville	30	8	8	14	36	47	−11	32	Spared from relegation
15	Saumur	30	7	7	16	29	54	−25	28	Spared from relegation
16	Le Poiré-sur-Vie (R)	30	3	5	22	18	58	−40	14	Relegation to National 3

Source: soccerway
Rules for classification: 1) points; 2) head-to-head results; 3) head-to-head goal difference; 4) goal difference; 5) number of goals scored; 6) fair play points; 7) draw
(C) Champions; (P) Promoted; (R) Relegated

=== Group C ===
Pos	Team	Pld	W	D	L	GF	GA	GD	Pts	Promotion or relegation
1	Fleury (C, P)	30	17	8	5	48	24	+24	59	Promotion to National
2	FC 93	30	16	5	9	42	35	+7	53	
3	Chambly	30	13	12	5	48	31	+17	48 (Note: Chambly were deducted three points.)	
4	Thionville	30	13	8	9	48	39	+9	47	
5	Créteil	30	11	9	10	35	29	+6	42	
6	Balagne (R)	30	11	11	8	54	44	+10	41 (Note: Balagne were deducted three points.)	Relegation to National 3
7	Beauvais	30	11	8	11	33	31	+2	41	
8	Furiani-Agliani	30	10	13	7	36	35	+1	41 (Note: Furiani-Agliani were deducted two points.)	
9	Feignies Aulnoye	30	11	7	12	42	35	+7	40	
10	Biesheim	30	10	10	10	42	37	+5	40	
11	Épinal	30	9	10	11	40	40	0	37	
12	Haguenau	30	10	7	13	38	44	−6	37	
13	Chantilly	30	8	12	10	36	46	−10	36	
14	Wasquehal	30	9	4	17	26	47	−21	31	Spared from relegation
15	Aubervilliers (R)	30	4	12	14	41	53	−12	24	Relegation to National 3
16	Villers-Houlgate (R)	30	5	8	17	25	64	−39	23	Relegation to National 3

Source: soccerway
Rules for classification: 1) points; 2) head-to-head results; 3) head-to-head goal difference; 4) goal difference; 5) number of goals scored; 6) fair play points; 7) draw
(C) Champions; (P) Promoted; (R) Relegated
