= 2022–23 Championnat National 3 =

Championnat National 3
- Season: 2022–23
- Dates: 28 August 2022 – 4 June 2023
- Champions: Cannes
- Promoted: 12 teams See Season outcomes section
- Relegated: 60 teams See Season outcomes section
- Top goalscorer: 25 Matar Diagne, Mâcon
- Biggest home win: Sochaux (res) 10–1 Quetigny; Group E, Game week 23, 6 May 2023; Feignies Aulnoye 10–1 Lambres-lez-Douai; Group I, Game week 23, 6 May 2023
- Biggest away win: Quetigny 1–11 Sochaux (res); Group E, Game week 11, 10 December 2022
- Highest scoring: Quetigny 1–11 Sochaux (res); Group E, Game week 11, 10 December 2022

The 2022–23 Championnat National 3 was the sixth season of the fifth tier in the French football league system in its current format. The competition was contested by 168 clubs split geographically across 12 groups of 14 teams. The teams included amateur clubs (although a few were semi-professional) and the reserve teams of professional clubs. The competition began on 28 August 2022 and ended on 4 June 2023.

== Teams ==
On 13 July 2022, the FFF ratified the constitution of the competition, and published the groups, although there were still some issues to be resolved at the time of publishing.

Changes from 2021 to 2022 season were as follows:

Teams joining the division

- Plabennec, Vitré, Schiltigheim, Lens (res), Entente SSG, Rumilly-Vallières, Marseille (res), Montpellier (res), Colomiers and Mont-de-Marsan finished in the relegation positions in 2021–22 Championnat National 2.
- Béziers were relegated from the Championnat National 2 by the Direction Nationale du Contrôle de Gestion for financial mismanagement.
- 36 teams gained promotion from the various Régional 1 leagues.

Teams promoted to Championnat National 3
| Region | Team | Method of qualification |
|---|---|---|
| Nouvelle-Aquitaine | Guéret | Champion, R1 Group A |
| Nouvelle-Aquitaine | Portes Entre-Deux-Mers | Champion, R1 Group B |
| Nouvelle-Aquitaine | Pau (res) | Champion, R1 Group C |
| Pays de la Loire | Saint-Nazaire | Champion, R1 Group A |
| Pays de la Loire | La Roche-sur-Yon | Champion, R1 Group B |
| Pays de la Loire | Beaucouze | Best runner-up |
| Centre-Val de Loire | Tours | Champion, R1 |
| Centre-Val de Loire | Dreux | Second, R1 |
| Centre-Val de Loire | Chambray | Third, R1 |
| Corse | FC Balagne | Champion, R1 Corse |
| Méditerranée | Carnoux | Champion, R1 Méditerranée |
| Méditerranée | EUGA Ardziv | Second, R1 Méditerranée |
| Bourgogne-Franche-Comté | Cosne-sur-Loire | Champion, R1 Group A |
| Bourgogne-Franche-Comté | Mâcon | Champion, R1 Group B |
| Bourgogne-Franche-Comté | Quetigny | Champion, R1 Group C |
| Grand Est | Reims Sainte-Anne | Champion, R1 Group A. Promoted via playoffs. |
| Grand Est | Jarville | Champion, R1 Group C. Promoted via playoffs. |
| Grand Est | Champigneulles | Champion, R1 Group B. Promoted via playoffs. |
| Occitanie | Bagnols Pont | Champion, R1 Group A |
| Occitanie | Union Saint-Jean | Champion, R1 Group B |
| Occitanie | Onet-le-Château | Champion, R1 Group C |
| Hauts-de-France | Longueau | Champion, R1 Group A |
| Hauts-de-France | Lambres-lez-Douai | Champion, R1 Group B |
| Hauts-de-France | Compiègne | Champion, R1 Group C |
| Normandy | Gonfreville | Champion, R1 Group A |
| Normandy | Grand-Quevilly | Champion, R1 Group B |
| Normandy | Mont-Gaillard | Best Runner-up |
| Brittany | US Montagnarde | Champion, R1 Group A |
| Brittany | Cesson | Champion, R1 Group B |
| Brittany | Dol-de-Bretagne | Champion, R1 Group C |
| Paris Île-de-France | Montrouge | Champion, R1 Group A |
| Paris Île-de-France | Vitry-sur-Seine | Champion, R1 Group B |
| Paris Île-de-France | Le Mée | Best Runner-up |
| Auvergne-Rhône-Alpes | Domérat | Champion, R1 Group A |
| Auvergne-Rhône-Alpes | Feurs | Champion, R1 Group B |
| Auvergne-Rhône-Alpes | Aix-les-Bains | Champion, R1 Group C |

Teams leaving the division

- Stade Bordelais, Saumur, Vierzon, Furiani-Agliani, Racing Besançon, Colmar, Alès, Wasquehal, Évreux, Rennes (res), Racing Club and Thonon Évian finished in the promotion places in 2021–22 Championnat National 3
- Bressuire, Cognac, Tartas, La Châtaigneraie, Sautron, Déols, Amilly, Istres, Athlético Marseille, Marseille Endoume, Saint-Jean Beaulieu, Mandelieu, Paron, Valdahon-Vercel, Saint-Louis Neuweg, Amnéville, Blagnac, Nîmes (res), Muret, Fabrègues, Saint-Omer, Boulogne (res), Le Touquet, Romilly, Bayeux, Stade Pontivyen, Plouzané, Guipry Messac, Trégunc, Créteil (res), Mantes, Meaux Academy, Velay, Aurillac and Moulins finished in the relegation zones and were relegated to Régional 1 for the 2022–23 season.
- Mulhouse were relegated by the DNCG for financial reasons and subsequently entered receivership.
- Narbonne were relegated by the Occitanie league after receiving a points deduction for not fielding junior teams in competitions as required by the regulations..

Other changes

- The merger of Marignane Gignac F.C. and Côte Bleue meant the second team of the new club, Marignane GCB (res), took the place of Côte Bleue in group D.

== Promotion and relegation ==
If eligible, the top team in each group is promoted to Championnat National 2. If a team finishing top of the group is ineligible, or declines promotion, the next eligible team in that group is promoted.

This season, five teams will be relegated from each group to their respective top regional league, subject to reprieves, as a result of the restructuring of the French leagues. Extra teams are relegated from a group if more than one team is relegated to that group from Championnat National 2. In the case that no teams are relegated to a group from Championnat National 2, one less team is relegated from that group to the regional league.

Reserve teams whose training centres are categorised as category 2B or lower cannot be promoted to Championnat National 2 by the rules of the competition.

== League tables ==
=== Group A: Nouvelle-Aquitaine ===
| Pos | Team | Pld | W | D | L | GF | GA | GD | Pts | Promotion or relegation |
|---|---|---|---|---|---|---|---|---|---|---|
| 1 | Libourne (P) | 26 | 17 | 6 | 3 | 52 | 15 | +37 | 57 | Promotion to National 2 |
| 2 | Anglet | 26 | 15 | 8 | 3 | 40 | 24 | +16 | 53 | |
| 3 | Chauvigny (Note: The match between Bordeaux (res) and Chauvigny, which took place on 7 May 2023, and ended with a 5–1 victory for Bordeaux (res), was subject to a challenge and sent for review by the league. Following the review, Chauvigny were awarded a 1–0 victory, and Bordeaux (res) were deducted a penalty point after they were found to have fielded a player who played for the senior team a day earlier.) | 26 | 15 | 8 | 3 | 47 | 27 | +20 | 53 | |
| 4 | Pau (res) (Note: The match between Poitiers and Pau (res), scheduled for 27 May 2023, did not take place, because the bus carrying Pau (res) broke down. The league will make a decision about whether the match is rescheduled.) | 25 | 13 | 6 | 6 | 49 | 25 | +24 | 45 | |
| 5 | Châtellerault | 26 | 12 | 4 | 10 | 42 | 41 | +1 | 40 | |
| 6 | Lège Cap Ferret | 26 | 11 | 5 | 10 | 33 | 39 | −6 | 38 | |
| 7 | Bayonne | 26 | 11 | 4 | 11 | 39 | 32 | +7 | 37 | |
| 8 | Niort (res) (Note: The match between Niort (res) and Poitiers on 12 February 2023, which ended 0–2, was subject to a challenge and was sent for review by the league. Following the review, Poitiers were awarded a 3–0 win, and Niort (res) were deducted a penalty point. On 28 April 2023, the FFF announce a penalty of 2 points for Niort (res), under the rules relating to qualification of football managers and coaches.) | 26 | 12 | 3 | 11 | 49 | 39 | +10 | 37 | |
| 9 | Poitiers | 25 | 9 | 9 | 7 | 33 | 27 | +6 | 36 | |
| 10 | Bordeaux (res) (R) | 26 | 9 | 6 | 11 | 31 | 30 | +1 | 32 | Relegation to Regional 1 |
| 11 | Portes Entre-Deux-Mers (R) | 26 | 8 | 5 | 13 | 28 | 43 | −15 | 29 | Relegation to Regional 1 |
| 12 | Neuville (R) | 26 | 4 | 9 | 13 | 32 | 50 | −18 | 21 | Relegation to Regional 1 |
| 13 | Guéret (R) | 26 | 3 | 5 | 18 | 22 | 61 | −39 | 14 | Relegation to Regional 1 |
| 14 | Mont-de-Marsan (R) | 26 | 1 | 4 | 21 | 19 | 63 | −44 | 7 | Relegation to Regional 1 |

Updated to match(es) played on 3 June 2023. Source: soccerway
Rules for classification: 1) points; 2) head-to-head results; 3) head-to-head goal difference; 4) goal difference; 5) number of goals scored; 6) fair play points; 7) draw
(P) Promoted; (R) Relegated

=== Group B: Pays de la Loire ===
| Pos | Team | Pld | W | D | L | GF | GA | GD | Pts | Promotion or relegation |
|---|---|---|---|---|---|---|---|---|---|---|
| 1 | La Roche (P) | 26 | 15 | 6 | 5 | 51 | 26 | +25 | 51 | Promotion to National 2 |
| 2 | Vertou | 26 | 13 | 8 | 5 | 65 | 37 | +28 | 47 (Note: Head to head, Vertou vs Challans: Vertou 4 points, Challans 1 point.) | |
| 3 | Challans | 26 | 13 | 8 | 5 | 43 | 22 | +21 | 47 | |
| 4 | Sablé | 26 | 12 | 6 | 8 | 53 | 40 | +13 | 42 | |
| 5 | Laval (res) | 26 | 11 | 8 | 7 | 37 | 28 | +9 | 41 | |
| 6 | Poiré-sur-Vie | 26 | 11 | 6 | 9 | 37 | 36 | +1 | 39 | |
| 7 | Fontenay | 26 | 9 | 10 | 7 | 28 | 20 | +8 | 37 (Note: Head to head, Fontenay vs Saint-Nazaire: Fontenay 4 points, Saint-Nazairt 1 point.) | |
| 8 | Saint-Nazaire | 26 | 9 | 10 | 7 | 31 | 37 | −6 | 37 | |
| 9 | Saint-Philbert-de-Grand-Lieu | 26 | 9 | 4 | 13 | 33 | 43 | −10 | 31 | |
| 10 | Le Mans (res) (R) | 26 | 7 | 9 | 10 | 41 | 42 | −1 | 30 | Relegation to Regional 1 |
| 11 | La Roche-sur-Yon (R) | 26 | 7 | 7 | 12 | 31 | 45 | −14 | 28 (Note: Head to head, La Roche-sur-Yon vs Beaucouzé: La Roche-sur-Yon 3 points, 0 goal difference. Beaucouzé 3 points, 0 goal difference. Head to head decided by overall goal difference.) | Relegation to Regional 1 |
| 12 | Beaucouzé (R) | 26 | 7 | 7 | 12 | 32 | 50 | −18 | 28 | Relegation to Regional 1 |
| 13 | Changé (R) | 26 | 4 | 7 | 15 | 29 | 59 | −30 | 19 | Relegation to Regional 1 |
| 14 | Pouzauges (Note: The match between Pouzauges and La Roche-sur-Yon on 11 February 2023, which finished 1–1, was subject to a challenge and was sent for review by the league. On 22 February 2023, the league announced that Pouzages were penalised for fielding a suspended player. La Roche-sur-Yon were awarded a 3–0 victory and Pouzauges were deducted a penalty point.) (R) | 26 | 5 | 4 | 17 | 31 | 57 | −26 | 18 | Relegation to Regional 1 |

Source: soccerway
Rules for classification: 1) points; 2) head-to-head results; 3) head-to-head goal difference; 4) goal difference; 5) number of goals scored; 6) fair play points; 7) draw
(P) Promoted; (R) Relegated

=== Group C: Centre-Val de Loire ===
| Pos | Team | Pld | W | D | L | GF | GA | GD | Pts | Promotion or relegation |
|---|---|---|---|---|---|---|---|---|---|---|
| 1 | Avoine Chinon (P) | 26 | 18 | 5 | 3 | 47 | 19 | +28 | 59 (Note: Head to head, Avoine Chinon vs Tours: Avoine Chinon 6 points, Tours 0 points.) | Promotion to National 2 |
| 2 | Tours | 26 | 18 | 5 | 3 | 59 | 21 | +38 | 59 | |
| 3 | Ouest Tourangeau | 26 | 17 | 5 | 4 | 64 | 27 | +37 | 56 | |
| 4 | Châteauneuf-sur-Loire (Note: The match between Châteauneuf-sur-Loire and Chambray on 18 September 2022 was abandoned after 11 minutes due to an injury, with the score 1–0. The match was replayed on 29 October 2022.) | 26 | 12 | 6 | 8 | 37 | 34 | +3 | 42 | |
| 5 | Montlouis-sur-Loire (Note: The game between Bourges Foot 18 (res) and Montlouis-sur-Loire on 23 October 2022, which finished 2–1, was subject to a challenge and was sent for review by the league. On 3 November, the league announced that Bourges Foot 18 (res) were penalised for fielding a suspended player. Montlouis-sur-Loire were awarded a 3–0 win and Bourges Foot 18 (res) were deducted a penalty point.) | 26 | 12 | 5 | 9 | 37 | 34 | +3 | 41 | |
| 6 | Orléans (res) | 26 | 11 | 3 | 12 | 29 | 28 | +1 | 36 | |
| 7 | Bourges Foot 18 (res) (Note: The game between Bourges Foot 18 (res) and Montlouis-sur-Loire on 23 October 2022, which finished 2–1, was subject to a challenge and was sent for review by the league. On 3 November, the league announced that Bourges Foot 18 (res) were penalised for fielding a suspended player. Montlouis-sur-Loire were awarded a 3–0 win and Bourges Foot 18 (res) were deducted a penalty point. The game between Dreux and Bourges Foot 18 (res) on 2 April 2023, which finished 2–2, was subject to a challenge and sent for review by the league. On 6 April, the league announced that Dreux were penalised for fielding a suspended player. Bourges Foot 18 (re) were awarded a 3–0 win and Dreux were deducted a penalty point.) | 26 | 9 | 7 | 10 | 32 | 29 | +3 | 33 | |
| 8 | Saran | 26 | 9 | 5 | 12 | 33 | 45 | −12 | 32 (Note: Head to head, Saran vs Châteauroux (res): Saran 6 points, Châteauroux (res) 0 points.) | |
| 9 | Châteauroux (res) | 26 | 8 | 8 | 10 | 37 | 37 | 0 | 32 | |
| 10 | Chambray | 26 | 6 | 8 | 12 | 20 | 32 | −12 | 26 (Note: Head to head, Chambray vs Saint-Jean-le-Blanc: Chambray 4 points, Saint-Jean-le-Blanc 1 point.) | |
| 11 | Saint-Jean-le-Blanc (R) | 26 | 7 | 5 | 14 | 32 | 46 | −14 | 26 | Relegation to Regional 1 |
| 12 | Chartres (res) (R) | 26 | 5 | 5 | 16 | 27 | 54 | −27 | 20 | Relegation to Regional 1 |
| 13 | Dreux (Note: On 16 December it was announced that the league had penalised Dreux five points due to an incident which happened during a pre-season friendly. The game between Dreux and Bourges Foot 18 (res) on 2 April 2023, which finished 2–2, was subject to a challenge and sent for review by the league. On 6 April, the league announced that Dreux were penalised for fielding a suspended player. Bourges Foot 18 (re) were awarded a 3–0 win and Dreux were deducted a penalty point.) (R) | 26 | 6 | 6 | 14 | 19 | 42 | −23 | 18 (Note: Head to head, Dreux vs Montargis: Dreux 6 points, Montargis 0 points.) | Relegation to Regional 1 |
| 14 | Montargis (R) | 26 | 3 | 9 | 14 | 28 | 53 | −25 | 18 | Relegation to Regional 1 |

Source: soccerway
Rules for classification: 1) points; 2) head-to-head results; 3) head-to-head goal difference; 4) goal difference; 5) number of goals scored; 6) fair play points; 7) draw
(P) Promoted; (R) Relegated

=== Group D: Provence-Alpes-Côte d'Azur-Corsica ===
| Pos | Team | Pld | W | D | L | GF | GA | GD | Pts | Promotion or relegation |
|---|---|---|---|---|---|---|---|---|---|---|
| 1 | Cannes (Note: The game between Cannes and Cannet Rocheville on 3 December 2022, was abandoned after 53 minutes due to rain making the pitch unplayable. The FFF ordered it to be replayed. The match was replayed on 7 January 2023.) (P) | 24 | 19 | 3 | 2 | 46 | 15 | +31 | 60 | Promotion to National 2 |
| 2 | Rousset | 24 | 13 | 1 | 10 | 42 | 35 | +7 | 40 | |
| 3 | AC Ajaccio (res) | 24 | 9 | 9 | 6 | 35 | 27 | +8 | 36 | |
| 4 | FC Balagne | 24 | 9 | 8 | 7 | 32 | 24 | +8 | 35 | |
| 5 | Corte | 24 | 9 | 7 | 8 | 36 | 39 | −3 | 34 (Note: Head to head, Corte vs Marseille (res): Corte 4 points, Marseille (res) 1 point.) | |
| 6 | Marseille (res) | 24 | 9 | 7 | 8 | 45 | 34 | +11 | 34 | |
| 7 | Lucciana | 24 | 9 | 6 | 9 | 38 | 37 | +1 | 33 | |
| 8 | Cannet Rocheville (Note: The game between Cannes and Cannet Rocheville on 3 December 2022, was abandoned after 53 minutes due to rain making the pitch unplayable. The FFF ordered it to be replayed. The match was replayed on 7 January 2023. The game between Cannet Rocheville and Carnoux on 25 February 2023, which ended 1–1, was subject to a challenge and sent for investigation by the FFF. The FFF awarded the game 3–0 to Cannet Rocheville and deducted a penalty point from Carnoux. No explanation has yet been published.) | 24 | 8 | 5 | 11 | 35 | 42 | −7 | 29 (Note: Head to head, Cannet Rocheville vs Istres: Cannet Rocheville 6 points, Istres 0 points.) | |
| 9 | Istres (Note: The game between FC Balagne and Istres on 1 April 2023 finished 1–2, however the result was subject to a challenge and sent for investigation by the FFF. The FFF awarded the game 3–0 to FC Balagne and deducted a penalty point from Istres. No explanation has yet been published.) | 24 | 7 | 9 | 8 | 28 | 35 | −7 | 29 | |
| 10 | EUGA Ardziv | 24 | 7 | 7 | 10 | 28 | 43 | −15 | 28 (Note: Head to head, EUGA Ardziv vs Carnoux: EUGA Ardziv 3 points, +1 goal difference, Carnoux 3 points, -1 goal difference.) | |
| 11 | Carnoux (R) | 24 | 7 | 8 | 9 | 25 | 35 | −10 | 28 | Relegation to Regional 1 |
| 12 | Nice (res) (Note: On 31 March 2023, the Commission Fédérale du Statut des Educateurs of the FFF penalised Nice (res) with the deduction of five points, after judging that the team had not had a sufficiently qualified coach for five matches in February and March 2023. This was later increased to six points.) (R) | 24 | 7 | 4 | 13 | 43 | 48 | −5 | 21 | Relegation to Regional 1 |
| 13 | Marignane GCB (res) (R) | 24 | 4 | 4 | 16 | 35 | 54 | −19 | 16 | Relegation to Regional 1 |
| 14 | Gazélec Ajaccio (Note: The match between Lucciana and Gazélec Ajaccio scheduled for 21 January 2023 did not take place due to ongoing court action against Gazélec Ajaccio. The club also suspended training for its senior teams. Lucciana were awarded the match 3–0 and Gazélec Ajaccio were deducted a point for forfeiting the game. On 23 January 2023, the Tribunal de Commerce (Commercial Court) ruled that Gazélec Ajaccio should be placed into liquidation, a decision confirmed on 30 January 2023, which resulted in their removal from the league and annulment of all their results.) (D, R) | 0 | 0 | 0 | 0 | 0 | 0 | 0 | 0 | Expelled from the league, with all results annulled. |

Source: soccerway
Rules for classification: 1) points; 2) head-to-head results; 3) head-to-head goal difference; 4) goal difference; 5) number of goals scored; 6) fair play points; 7) draw
(D) Disqualified; (P) Promoted; (R) Relegated

=== Group E: Bourgogne-Franche-Comté ===
| Pos | Team | Pld | W | D | L | GF | GA | GD | Pts | Promotion or relegation |
|---|---|---|---|---|---|---|---|---|---|---|
| 1 | Mâcon (Note: The game between Mâcon and Besançon Football on 13 May 2023, which finished 1–1, was subject to a challenge and was sent for review by the league. On 26 May 2023, the league announced a loss by penalty for Besançon Football, deducted a penalty point, and awarded Mâcon a 1–0 win.) (P) | 26 | 17 | 5 | 4 | 61 | 26 | +35 | 56 | Promotion to National 2 |
| 2 | Pontarlier | 26 | 17 | 2 | 7 | 48 | 27 | +21 | 53 | |
| 3 | Jura Dolois | 26 | 13 | 9 | 4 | 49 | 38 | +11 | 48 (Note: Head to head, Jura Dolois vs Dijon (res): Jura Dolois 4 points, Dijon (res) 1 point.) | |
| 4 | Dijon (res) | 26 | 14 | 6 | 6 | 49 | 25 | +24 | 48 | |
| 5 | Is-Selongey (Note: On 18 January 2023, the league published penalties of three points for Is-Selongey and six points for Quetigny, for having first-team coaches without sufficient qualifications for three and six games respectively.) | 26 | 15 | 3 | 8 | 41 | 35 | +6 | 45 | |
| 6 | Sochaux (res) | 26 | 12 | 5 | 9 | 69 | 31 | +38 | 41 | |
| 7 | Besançon Football | 26 | 12 | 5 | 9 | 51 | 31 | +20 | 40 | |
| 8 | Cosne-sur-Loire | 26 | 10 | 6 | 10 | 36 | 35 | +1 | 36 | |
| 9 | Gueugnon | 26 | 9 | 7 | 10 | 35 | 34 | +1 | 34 | |
| 10 | Morteau-Montlebon (Note: The game between Morteau-Montlebon and Montceau on 5 November 2022, which finished 0–1, was the subject of a challenge and was sent for review by the league. The result was removed from the table whilst the review took place. On 23 November 2022 the league rejected the challenge, and the result was re-instated.) (R) | 26 | 7 | 9 | 10 | 30 | 42 | −12 | 30 | Relegation to Regional 1 |
| 11 | Grandvillars (R) | 26 | 9 | 1 | 16 | 36 | 49 | −13 | 28 | Relegation to Regional 1 |
| 12 | Saint-Apollinaire (R) | 26 | 7 | 6 | 13 | 35 | 49 | −14 | 27 | Relegation to Regional 1 |
| 13 | Montceau (Note: The game between Pontarlier and Montceau on 25 February 2023, which finished 0–1, was subject to a challenge and was sent for review by the league. The initial review focussed on a potential suspension of a Montceau player. On 23 March 2023, the league announced a loss by penalty for Montceau, deducted a penalty point, and awarded three points for a win to Pontarlier.) (R) | 26 | 4 | 6 | 16 | 20 | 50 | −30 | 17 | Relegation to Regional 1 |
| 14 | Quetigny (R) | 26 | 1 | 0 | 25 | 27 | 115 | −88 | −3 | Relegation to Regional 1 |

Source: soccerway
Rules for classification: 1) points; 2) head-to-head results; 3) head-to-head goal difference; 4) goal difference; 5) number of goals scored; 6) fair play points; 7) draw
(P) Promoted; (R) Relegated

=== Group F: Grand Est ===
| Pos | Team | Pld | W | D | L | GF | GA | GD | Pts | Promotion or relegation |
|---|---|---|---|---|---|---|---|---|---|---|
| 1 | Biesheim (P) | 26 | 16 | 7 | 3 | 54 | 21 | +33 | 55 | Promotion to National 2 |
| 2 | Raon-l'Étape | 26 | 15 | 5 | 6 | 58 | 29 | +29 | 50 | |
| 3 | ESTAC Troyes (res) | 26 | 14 | 6 | 6 | 44 | 27 | +17 | 48 | |
| 4 | Prix-lès-Mézières | 26 | 13 | 7 | 6 | 44 | 30 | +14 | 46 | |
| 5 | Thaon | 26 | 12 | 9 | 5 | 41 | 30 | +11 | 45 | |
| 6 | RC Strasbourg (res) | 26 | 13 | 5 | 8 | 54 | 39 | +15 | 44 (Note: Head to head, RC Strasbourg (res) vs Sarre-Union: RC Strasbourg (res) 3 points, +1 goal difference, Sarre-Union 3 points, -1 goal difference.) | |
| 7 | Sarre-Union | 26 | 11 | 11 | 4 | 55 | 35 | +20 | 44 | |
| 8 | Reims Sainte-Anne | 26 | 10 | 8 | 8 | 57 | 37 | +20 | 38 | |
| 9 | Nancy (res) (Note: On 28 April 2023, the FFF announce a penalty of 3 points for Nancy (res), under the rules relating to qualification of football managers and coaches.) | 26 | 11 | 7 | 8 | 33 | 31 | +2 | 36 | |
| 10 | Schiltigheim (R) | 26 | 10 | 4 | 12 | 55 | 52 | +3 | 34 | Relegation to Regional 1 |
| 11 | Épernay (R) | 26 | 7 | 6 | 13 | 35 | 41 | −6 | 27 | Relegation to Regional 1 |
| 12 | Champigneulles (Note: On 3 May 2023, the FFF announced a penalty of 8 points for Champigneulles, under the rules relating to qualification of football managers and coaches, for two of their staff. The penalty is subject to appeal.) (R) | 26 | 3 | 7 | 16 | 20 | 57 | −37 | 8 (Note: Head to head, Champigneulles vs Illkirch-Graffenstaden: Champigneulles 3 points, +1 goal difference, Illkirch-Graffenstaden 3 points, -1 goal difference.) | Relegation to Regional 1 |
| 13 | Illkirch-Graffenstaden (Note: Illkirch-Graffenstaden were penalised regarding the match on 27 August 2022 against Raon-l'Étape. The original score was 0–0. Raon-l'Étape were awarded a 3–0 win, and Illkirch-Graffenstaden were deducted a penalty point. Illkirch-Graffenstaden were penalised again regarding the reverse fixture on 3 June 2023, when the match had to be abandoned after they had started the game with just 8 players, one of whom suffered an injury after less than 2 minutes. Raon-l'Étape were again awarded a 3–0 win, and Illkirch-Graffenstaden were deducted another penalty point.) (R) | 26 | 3 | 1 | 22 | 16 | 66 | −50 | 8 | Relegation to Regional 1 |
| 14 | Jarville (Note: The match between Jarville and Épernay on 18 September 2022 was not played, because the officials deemed the pitch unplayable. Subsequently, Épernay were awarded a 3–0 win, and Jarville were deducted a penalty point.) (R) | 26 | 1 | 3 | 22 | 18 | 89 | −71 | 5 | Relegation to Regional 1 |

Source: soccerway
Rules for classification: 1) points; 2) head-to-head results; 3) head-to-head goal difference; 4) goal difference; 5) number of goals scored; 6) fair play points; 7) draw
(P) Promoted; (R) Relegated

=== Group H: Occitanie ===
| Pos | Team | Pld | W | D | L | GF | GA | GD | Pts | Promotion or relegation |
|---|---|---|---|---|---|---|---|---|---|---|
| 1 | Béziers (C, R) | 26 | 17 | 6 | 3 | 40 | 16 | +24 | 57 | Administrative relegation to Regional 1 |
| 2 | Toulouse (res) (P) | 26 | 17 | 4 | 5 | 46 | 26 | +20 | 55 | Promotion to National 2 |
| 3 | Stade Beaucairois | 26 | 16 | 5 | 5 | 43 | 21 | +22 | 53 | |
| 4 | Castanet | 26 | 13 | 5 | 8 | 41 | 29 | +12 | 44 | |
| 5 | Montpellier (res) | 26 | 11 | 6 | 9 | 32 | 23 | +9 | 39 | |
| 6 | Agde | 26 | 10 | 7 | 9 | 34 | 37 | −3 | 37 | |
| 7 | Alberes Argelès | 26 | 9 | 6 | 11 | 36 | 39 | −3 | 33 (Note: Head to head, Alberes Argelès vs Colomiers: Alberes Argelès 3 points, +1 goal difference, Colomiers 3 points, -1 goal difference) | |
| 8 | Colomiers | 26 | 8 | 9 | 9 | 30 | 32 | −2 | 33 | |
| 9 | Onet-le-Château | 26 | 8 | 7 | 11 | 42 | 50 | −8 | 31 | |
| 10 | Aigues-Mortes (R) | 26 | 7 | 8 | 11 | 32 | 34 | −2 | 29 (Note: Head to head, Aigues-Mortes vs Rodez (res): Aigues-Mortes 3 points, +3 goal difference, Rodez (res) 3 points, -3 goal difference.) | Relegation to Regional 1 |
| 11 | Rodez (res) (R) | 26 | 9 | 2 | 15 | 43 | 49 | −6 | 29 | Relegation to Regional 1 |
| 12 | Balma (R) | 26 | 7 | 7 | 12 | 33 | 39 | −6 | 28 | Relegation to Regional 1 |
| 13 | Union Saint-Jean (R) | 26 | 4 | 8 | 14 | 28 | 47 | −19 | 20 | Relegation to Regional 1 |
| 14 | Bagnols Pont (R) | 26 | 4 | 4 | 18 | 25 | 63 | −38 | 16 | Relegation to Regional 1 |

Source: soccerway
Rules for classification: 1) points; 2) head-to-head results; 3) head-to-head goal difference; 4) goal difference; 5) number of goals scored; 6) fair play points; 7) draw
(C) Champions; (P) Promoted; (R) Relegated

=== Group I: Hauts-de-France ===
| Pos | Team | Pld | W | D | L | GF | GA | GD | Pts | Promotion or relegation |
|---|---|---|---|---|---|---|---|---|---|---|
| 1 | Feignies Aulnoye (P) | 26 | 19 | 3 | 4 | 60 | 29 | +31 | 60 | Promotion to National 2 |
| 2 | Lens (res) | 26 | 14 | 5 | 7 | 64 | 30 | +34 | 47 (Note: Head to head, Lens (res) vs Valenciennes (res): Lens (res) 3 points, +1 goal difference, Valenciennes (res) 3 points, -1 goal difference.) | |
| 3 | Valenciennes (res) | 26 | 14 | 5 | 7 | 45 | 29 | +16 | 47 | |
| 4 | Olympique Marcquois (Note: The match between Vimy and Olympique Marcquois, which finished 2–1, was the subject of a challenge and was referred to the league to review. On 15 March 2023, the league penalised Olympique Marcquois for fielding a suspended player. Vimy were awarded a 3–0 win, and Olympique Marcquois were deducted a penalty point.) | 26 | 13 | 5 | 8 | 41 | 29 | +12 | 43 | |
| 5 | Croix | 26 | 11 | 8 | 7 | 37 | 29 | +8 | 41 | |
| 6 | Lille (res) | 26 | 11 | 7 | 8 | 41 | 30 | +11 | 40 | |
| 7 | Compiègne | 26 | 11 | 6 | 9 | 39 | 40 | −1 | 39 (Note: Head to head, Compiègne vs Vimy: Compiègne 4 points, Vimy 1 point.) | |
| 8 | Vimy | 26 | 12 | 3 | 11 | 34 | 40 | −6 | 39 | |
| 9 | Chantilly | 26 | 11 | 5 | 10 | 48 | 46 | +2 | 38 | |
| 10 | Maubeuge (R) | 26 | 10 | 7 | 9 | 40 | 44 | −4 | 37 | Relegation to Regional 1 |
| 11 | Amiens SC (res) (R) | 26 | 9 | 5 | 12 | 43 | 46 | −3 | 32 | Relegation to Regional 1 |
| 12 | AC Amiens (R) | 26 | 6 | 1 | 19 | 30 | 52 | −22 | 19 | Relegation to Regional 1 |
| 13 | Lambres-lez-Douai (R) | 26 | 5 | 3 | 18 | 19 | 61 | −42 | 18 | Relegation to Regional 1 |
| 14 | Longueau (R) | 26 | 3 | 3 | 20 | 18 | 54 | −36 | 12 | Relegation to Regional 1 |

Source: soccerway
Rules for classification: 1) points; 2) head-to-head results; 3) head-to-head goal difference; 4) goal difference; 5) number of goals scored; 6) fair play points; 7) draw
(P) Promoted; (R) Relegated

=== Group J: Normandy ===
| Pos | Team | Pld | W | D | L | GF | GA | GD | Pts | Promotion or relegation |
|---|---|---|---|---|---|---|---|---|---|---|
| 1 | Vire (P) | 26 | 18 | 5 | 3 | 66 | 29 | +37 | 59 | Promotion to National 2 |
| 2 | AG Caen (Note: The match between Avranches (res) and AG Caen on 6 May 2023, which ended 2–0, was subject to a challenge. Avranches (res) were found to have fielded a suspended player. AG Caen were awarded a 3–0 victory and Avranches (res) were deducted a penalty point.) | 26 | 13 | 4 | 9 | 45 | 38 | +7 | 43 | |
| 3 | Dieppe | 26 | 12 | 6 | 8 | 35 | 24 | +11 | 42 | |
| 4 | Cherbourg (D, R) | 26 | 12 | 5 | 9 | 36 | 37 | −1 | 41 | Administrative relegation to Régional 3 |
| 5 | Le Havre (res) | 26 | 11 | 7 | 8 | 37 | 23 | +14 | 40 | |
| 6 | Alençon | 26 | 10 | 9 | 7 | 49 | 32 | +17 | 39 | |
| 7 | Quevilly-Rouen (res) | 26 | 11 | 5 | 10 | 45 | 44 | +1 | 38 | |
| 8 | Oissel | 26 | 10 | 7 | 9 | 32 | 30 | +2 | 37 | |
| 9 | Saint-Lô | 26 | 11 | 3 | 12 | 31 | 42 | −11 | 36 (Note: Head to head, Saint-Lô vs Dives-Cabourg: Saint-Lô 4 points, Dives-Cabourg 1 point.) | |
| 10 | Dives-Cabourg | 26 | 9 | 9 | 8 | 35 | 35 | 0 | 36 | |
| 11 | Gonfreville (Note: The match between Mont-Gaillard and Gonfreville on 6 May 2023, which ended 2–2, was subject to a challenge. Gonfreville were awarded a 3–0 victory and Mont-Gaillard were dedcuted a penalty point.) (R) | 26 | 10 | 3 | 13 | 39 | 38 | +1 | 33 | Relegation to Régional 1 |
| 12 | Avranches (res) (R) | 26 | 7 | 8 | 11 | 32 | 50 | −18 | 28 | Relegation to Régional 1 |
| 13 | Grand-Quevilly (R) | 26 | 5 | 3 | 18 | 29 | 56 | −27 | 18 | Relegation to Régional 1 |
| 14 | Mont-Gaillard (R) | 26 | 3 | 6 | 17 | 19 | 52 | −33 | 14 | Relegation to Régional 1 |

Source: soccerway
Rules for classification: 1) points; 2) head-to-head results; 3) head-to-head goal difference; 4) goal difference; 5) number of goals scored; 6) fair play points; 7) draw
(D) Disqualified; (P) Promoted; (R) Relegated

=== Group K: Brittany ===
| Pos | Team | Pld | W | D | L | GF | GA | GD | Pts | Promotion or relegation |
|---|---|---|---|---|---|---|---|---|---|---|
| 1 | Dinan-Léhon (P) | 26 | 16 | 9 | 1 | 52 | 21 | +31 | 57 | Promotion to National 2 |
| 2 | Milizac | 26 | 13 | 7 | 6 | 40 | 24 | +16 | 46 | |
| 3 | Vitré | 26 | 11 | 9 | 6 | 54 | 37 | +17 | 42 | |
| 4 | Fougères | 26 | 10 | 11 | 5 | 37 | 32 | +5 | 41 | |
| 5 | Saint-Colomban Locminé | 26 | 10 | 8 | 8 | 40 | 32 | +8 | 38 | |
| 6 | Lannion | 26 | 10 | 7 | 9 | 42 | 34 | +8 | 37 | |
| 7 | TA Rennes | 26 | 10 | 6 | 10 | 30 | 36 | −6 | 36 | |
| 8 | Stade Briochin (res) | 26 | 9 | 7 | 10 | 32 | 33 | −1 | 34 | |
| 9 | Plabennec | 26 | 7 | 9 | 10 | 46 | 52 | −6 | 30 (Note: Head to head, Plabennec vs Pontivy vs Cesson: Plabennec 5 points, +3 goal difference, Pontivy 5 points, -1 goal difference, Cesson 5 points, -2 goal difference.) | |
| 10 | Pontivy | 26 | 7 | 9 | 10 | 32 | 43 | −11 | 30 | |
| 11 | Cesson (R) | 26 | 8 | 6 | 12 | 34 | 38 | −4 | 30 | Relegation to Regional 1 |
| 12 | Brest (res) (R) | 26 | 7 | 8 | 11 | 35 | 35 | 0 | 29 | Relegation to Regional 1 |
| 13 | Dol-de-Bretagne (R) | 26 | 7 | 2 | 17 | 29 | 63 | −34 | 23 | Relegation to Regional 1 |
| 14 | US Montagnarde (R) | 26 | 5 | 6 | 15 | 25 | 48 | −23 | 21 | Relegation to Regional 1 |

Source: soccerway
Rules for classification: 1) points; 2) head-to-head results; 3) head-to-head goal difference; 4) goal difference; 5) number of goals scored; 6) fair play points; 7) draw
(P) Promoted; (R) Relegated

=== Group L: Île-de-France ===
| Pos | Team | Pld | W | D | L | GF | GA | GD | Pts | Promotion or relegation |
|---|---|---|---|---|---|---|---|---|---|---|
| 1 | Aubervilliers (P) | 26 | 12 | 8 | 6 | 45 | 40 | +5 | 44 | Promotion to National 2 |
| 2 | Linas-Montlhéry | 26 | 12 | 6 | 8 | 34 | 33 | +1 | 42 | |
| 3 | Drancy | 26 | 12 | 5 | 9 | 46 | 34 | +12 | 41 | |
| 4 | Vitry-sur-Seine | 26 | 8 | 13 | 5 | 39 | 36 | +3 | 37 | |
| 5 | Les Mureaux | 26 | 9 | 8 | 9 | 45 | 45 | 0 | 35 (Note: Head to head, Les Mureaux vs Montrouge vs Brétigny: Les Mureaux 9 points, Montrouge 6 points, Brétigny 3 points.) | |
| 6 | Montrouge | 26 | 9 | 8 | 9 | 38 | 41 | −3 | 35 | |
| 7 | Brétigny | 26 | 11 | 2 | 13 | 28 | 32 | −4 | 35 | |
| 8 | Ivry | 26 | 8 | 10 | 8 | 27 | 29 | −2 | 34 (Note: Head to head, Ivry vs Entente SSG: Ivry 4 points, Entente SSG 1 point.) | |
| 9 | Entente SSG | 26 | 8 | 10 | 8 | 27 | 25 | +2 | 34 | |
| 10 | Les Ulis (R) | 26 | 7 | 12 | 7 | 33 | 28 | +5 | 33 | Relegation to Regional 1 |
| 11 | Paris FC (res) (R) | 26 | 8 | 8 | 10 | 45 | 44 | +1 | 32 | Relegation to Regional 1 |
| 12 | Paris Saint-Germain (res) (R) | 26 | 7 | 9 | 10 | 31 | 30 | +1 | 30 | Relegation to Regional 1 |
| 13 | Blanc-Mesnil (Note: Blanc-Mesnil were penalised for fielding a suspended player in the match at Linas-Montlhéry on 27 August 2022. The original scoreline was 2–3. Linas-Montlhéry were awarded a 2–0 win, and Blanc-Mesnil were deducted a penalty point.) (R) | 26 | 7 | 8 | 11 | 27 | 38 | −11 | 28 (Note: Head to head, Blanc-Mesnil vs Le Mée: Blanc-Mesnil 4 points, Le Mée 1 point.) | Relegation to Regional 1 |
| 14 | Le Mée (R) | 26 | 7 | 7 | 12 | 28 | 38 | −10 | 28 | Relegation to Regional 1 |

Source: soccerway
Rules for classification: 1) points; 2) head-to-head results; 3) head-to-head goal difference; 4) goal difference; 5) number of goals scored; 6) fair play points; 7) draw
(P) Promoted; (R) Relegated

=== Group M: Auvergne-Rhône-Alpes ===
| Pos | Team | Pld | W | D | L | GF | GA | GD | Pts | Promotion or relegation |
|---|---|---|---|---|---|---|---|---|---|---|
| 1 | Bourgoin-Jallieu (P) | 26 | 15 | 9 | 2 | 41 | 15 | +26 | 54 | Promotion to National 2 |
| 2 | Rumilly-Vallières | 26 | 16 | 4 | 6 | 47 | 17 | +30 | 52 | |
| 3 | Saint-Étienne (res) | 26 | 14 | 5 | 7 | 45 | 24 | +21 | 47 | |
| 4 | Clermont (res) | 26 | 12 | 5 | 9 | 51 | 42 | +9 | 41 (Note: Head to head, Clermont (res) vs Vaulx-en-Velin: Clermont (res) 6 points, Vaulx-en-Velin 0 points.) | |
| 5 | Vaulx-en-Velin (Note: The match between Vaulx-en-Velin and Clermont (res) on 28 August 2022 was abandoned by the referee in the 91st minute after he was hit by a bottle thrown from the crowd. The scoreline was 1–0 at the time. Clermont (res) were awarded a 3–0 win and Vaulx-en-Velin were deducted a penalty point.) | 26 | 12 | 6 | 8 | 41 | 34 | +7 | 41 | |
| 6 | Hauts Lyonnais | 26 | 12 | 4 | 10 | 28 | 27 | +1 | 40 | |
| 7 | Limonest | 26 | 12 | 3 | 11 | 47 | 32 | +15 | 39 | |
| 8 | Ain Sud | 26 | 9 | 10 | 7 | 36 | 35 | +1 | 37 (Note: Head to head, Ain Sud vs Feurs: Ain Sud 3 points, 0 goal difference, Feurs 3 points, 0 goal difference. Head to head resolved via overall number of goals scored.) | |
| 9 | Feurs | 26 | 9 | 10 | 7 | 33 | 32 | +1 | 37 | |
| 10 | Chambéry | 26 | 10 | 6 | 10 | 35 | 33 | +2 | 36 | |
| 11 | Domérat (R) | 26 | 7 | 6 | 13 | 27 | 45 | −18 | 27 | Relegation to Regional 1 |
| 12 | Aix-les-Bains (R) | 26 | 5 | 7 | 14 | 23 | 49 | −26 | 22 | Relegation to Regional 1 |
| 13 | Lyon La Duchère (res) (R) | 26 | 5 | 5 | 16 | 27 | 46 | −19 | 20 | Relegation to Regional 1 |
| 14 | Montluçon (R) | 26 | 2 | 4 | 20 | 17 | 67 | −50 | 10 | Relegation to Regional 1 |

Source: soccerway
Rules for classification: 1) points; 2) head-to-head results; 3) head-to-head goal difference; 4) goal difference; 5) number of goals scored; 6) fair play points; 7) draw
(P) Promoted; (R) Relegated

== Top scorers ==
As of end of season.

| Rank | Player | Club | Goals |
|---|---|---|---|
| 1 | (Senegal) Matar Diagne | Mâcon | 25 |
| 2 | (France) Arthur Dallois | Vire | 22 |
| 2 | (France) Walid Bouabdelli | Reims Sainte-Anne | 22 |
| 4 | (France) Sofiane Sidi Ali | Marseille (res) and Rousset | 20 |
| 4 | (Senegal) Bassirou N'Diayé | Sochaux (res) | 20 |
| 4 | (France) Hakim El Hamdaoui | Alençon | 20 |
| 7 | (France) Jules Varvat | Saint-Jean-le-Blanc | 19 |
| 7 | (France) Isaac Tshipamba | Quevilly-Rouen (res) | 19 |
| 9 | (France) Anthony Vermet | Dinan-Léhon | 18 |
| 9 | (France) Mathias Lopes | Tours | 18 |
| 9 | (France) Jean-Paul Kumbi | Schiltigheim | 18 |

== Season outcomes ==
=== Promotion ===
Libourne, La Roche, Avoine Chinon, Cannes, Mâcon, Biesheim, Feignies Aulnoye, Vire, Dinan Léhon, Aubervilliers and Bourgoin-Jallieu were champions of each group, and were promoted to 2023–24 Championnat National 2. Béziers finished top of their group, but were denied promotion by the DNCG, and failed to appeal successfully. Toulouse (res) were promoted as runners-up.

=== Relegation ===
A total of 60 teams were initially relegated due to finishing in the bottom five places in each group. Reprieves are required to maintain the correct number of teams in the division, in light of any administrative relegations from this or higher divisions enacted by the FFF and DNCG. The relegated teams will take their place in the Régional 1 competition of their respective regional leagues:

Nouvelle-Aquitaine

Mont-de-Marsan, Guéret, Neuville, Portes Entre-Deux-Mers and Bordeaux (res)

Pays de la Loire

Pouzauges, Changé, Beaucouzé, La Roche-sur-Yon and Le Mans (res)

Centre-Val de Loire

Montargis, Dreux, Chartres (res), Saint-Jean-le-Blanc and Chambray

Corsica

None (Note: Gazélec Ajaccio were liquidated during the season and will not take a place in Régional 1.)

Mediterranean

Marignane GCB (res), Nice (res), Carnoux and EUGA Ardziv

Bourgogne-Franche-Comté

Quetigny, Montceau, Saint-Apollinaire, Grandvillars and Morteau-Montlebon

Grand Est

Jarville, Illkirch-Graffenstaden, Champigneulles, Épernay and Schiltigheim

Occitanie

Bagnols Pont, Union Saint-Jean, Balma, Rodez (res) and Aigues-Mortes

Hauts-de-France

Longueau, Lambres-lez-Douai, AC Amiens, Amiens SC (res) and Maubeuge

Normandy

Mont-Gaillard, Grand-Quevilly, Avranches (res), Gonfreville and Dives-Cabourg

Brittany

US Montagnarde, Dol-de-Bretagne, Brest (res), Cesson and Pontivy

Paris and Île-de-France

Le Mée, Blanc-Mesnil, Paris Saint-Germain (res), Paris FC (res) and Les Ulis

Auvergne-Rhône-Alpes

Montluçon, Lyon La Duchère (res), Aix-les-Bains, Domérat and Chambéry

=== Reprieves ===
Any reprieve required will initially go to the tenth placed team in Group D, EUGA Ardziv. Any reprieves required beyond this will come from the tenth-placed team with the best record against the teams placed sixth to ninth in their group.

Ranking of tenth placed teams.

| Pos | Team | Pts | |
|---|---|---|---|
| 1 | Chambray | 15 | Reprieved |
| 2 | Pontivy | 13 | Reprieved |
| 3 | Bordeaux (res) | 12 | Reprieved |
| 4 | Dives-Cabourg | 12 | Reprieved |
| 5 | Chambéry | 11 | Reprieved |
| 6 | Schiltigheim | 11 | Relegated |
| 7 | Les Ulis | 10 | Relegated |
| 8 | Le Mans (res) | 9 | Relegated |
| 9 | Aigues-Mortes | 9 | Relegated |
| 10 | Maubeuge | 9 | Relegated |
| 11 | Morteau-Montlebon | 3 | Relegated |

Subject to any appeals to be enacted, reprieves are required due to the following administrative decisions:

- Poissy and Évreux were excluded from National competitions by the DNCG, and will not take their place in National 3, having been relegated from 2022–23 Championnat National 2. Poissy appealed unsuccessfully against the decision.
- C'Chartres Football were administratively relegated to Régional 1, in addition to being relegated from 2022–23 Championnat National 2. The decision was confirmed on appeal.
- FC Sète 34 were placed into receivership, which automatically triggered an administrative relegation. Due to finishing in the 2022–23 Championnat National 2 relegation places, they will therefore be relegated at least to Régional 1.
- Cherbourg were excluded from National competitions by the Ligue de Normandie, and will be relegated to Régional 3.
- Sedan were excluded from national competition by the DNCG appeals committee, after unsuccessfully appealing their demotion from 2022–23 Championnat National.

Additionally:

- Canet Roussillon FC were initially administratively relegated to Régional 1, in addition to being relegated from 2022–23 Championnat National 2, but successfully appealed the decision.
