= 2023–24 Championnat National 2 =

Championnat National 2
- Season: 2023–24
- Dates: 26 August 2023 – 18 May 2024
- Promoted: Aubagne; Paris 13 Atletico; Boulogne; Bourg-Péronnas
- Top goalscorer: 12 Amine Meftah; Aubervilliers
- Biggest home win: Cannes 8–1 Alès; Group A, Game week 4, 16 September 2023
- Biggest away win: Thonon Évian 0–6 Hyères; Group A, Game week 3, 9 September 2023
- Highest scoring: Cannes 8–1 Alès; Group A, Game week 4, 16 September 2023

The 2023–24 Championnat National 2 was the 26th season of the fourth tier in the French football league system in its current format. This season the competition was contested by 56 clubs split geographically across four groups of 14 teams, a change from the previous season, as part of the restructuring of the French football league system. The teams included amateur clubs (although a few were semi-professional) and the reserve teams of professional clubs. The competition began on 28 August 2023 and concluded on 18 May 2024.

== Teams ==
On 13 July 2023, the FFF ratified the constitution of the competition, and published the groups.

Changes from the 2022–23 season are:

Teams joining the division

- Bourg-Péronnas, Stade Briochin, Le Puy, Paris 13 Atletico and Borgo finished in the relegation positions in 2022-23 Championnat National.
- Libourne, La Roche, Avoine Chinon, Cannes, Mâcon, Biesheim, Feignies Aulnoye, Vire, Dinan Léhon, Aubervilliers and Bourgoin-Jallieu were promoted as champions of their 2022–23 Championnat National 3 groups.
- Béziers finished top of their 2022–23 Championnat National 3 group, but were denied promotion by the DNCG, and failed to appeal successfully. Toulouse (res) were promoted as runners-up.

Teams leaving the division

- Rouen, Épinal, Marignane GCB, GOAL FC were champions of each group, and were promoted to 2023–24 Championnat National.
- Évreux, Rennes (res), Vannes, SM Caen (res), Chartres, Reims (res), Sainte-Geneviève, Metz (res), Belfort, Saint-Maur, Sète, Saint-Priest, Lyon (res), Canet Roussillon, Louhans-Cuiseaux, Vierzon, Moulins Yzeure, Stade Bordelais and Nantes (res) finished in relegation positions in 2022–23 Championnat National 2 and were relegated to 2023–24 Championnat National 3
- Lyon La Duchère were administratively relegated by the DNCG to 2023–24 Championnat National 3.
- Poissy were excluded from national competition by the DNCG, which was confirmed on appeal.

== Promotion and relegation ==
The top team in each group will be promoted to 2024–25 Championnat National.

Due to the restructuring of the French football leagues, this season the bottom five teams in each group will be relegated to 2024–25 Championnat National 3, along with the worst performing ninth-placed team. This performance will calculated based on the performance of each ninth-placed team in matches against the teams finishing 4th to 8th.

== League tables ==
=== Group A ===
Pos	Team	Pld	W	D	L	GF	GA	GD	Pts	Promotion or relegation
1	Aubagne (C, P)	26	14	10	2	33	17	+16	52	Promotion to National
2	Le Puy	26	12	10	4	39	24	+15	46	
3	Grasse	26	10	12	4	31	21	+10	42	
4	Jura Sud	26	10	11	5	34	23	+11	41	
5	Cannes	26	9	13	4	41	21	+20	40	
6	Hyères	26	9	10	7	37	22	+15	37	
7	Fréjus Saint-Raphaël	26	8	12	6	25	19	+6	36	
8	Toulon	26	9	8	9	30	29	+1	35	
9	Andrézieux	26	9	7	10	26	28	−2	34	
10	Alès (R)	26	7	8	11	23	39	−16	29	Relegation to National 3
11	Thonon Évian (R)	26	7	7	12	27	35	−8	28	Relegation to National 3
12	Chamalières (R)	26	5	11	10	26	40	−14	26	Relegation to National 3
13	Bourgoin-Jallieu (R)	26	4	9	13	24	43	−19	21	Relegation to National 3
14	Toulouse (res) (R)	26	1	8	17	24	59	−35	11	Relegation to National 3

Source: soccerway
Rules for classification: 1) points; 2) head-to-head results; 3) head-to-head goal difference; 4) goal difference; 5) number of goals scored; 6) fair play points; 7) draw
(C) Champions; (P) Promoted; (R) Relegated

=== Group B ===
Pos	Team	Pld	W	D	L	GF	GA	GD	Pts	Promotion or relegation
1	Paris 13 Atletico (C, P)	26	13	9	4	41	24	+17	48 (Note: Head to head, Paris 13 Atletico vs La Roche. Paris 13 Atletico 3 points, +1 Goal Difference, La Roche 3 points, -1 Goal Difference.)	Promotion to National
2	La Roche	26	13	9	4	40	19	+21	48	
3	Libourne (D, R)	26	10	10	6	44	35	+9	40	Demoted to Régional 3
4	Saint-Pryvé Saint-Hilaire	26	10	8	8	32	27	+5	38	
5	Bergerac (Note: On 5 December 2023 it was announced that Bergerac had been deducted three points by the DNCG for financial mismanagement.)	26	10	10	6	36	29	+7	37 (Note: Head to head, Bergerac vs Angoulême vs Blois vs Bourges vs Les Herbiers. Bergerac 13 points, +3 Goal Difference, Angoulême 13 points, +3 Goal Difference, Blois 9 points, -2 Goal Difference, Bourges Foot 9 points, -4 Goal Difference, Les Herbiers 8 points, +0 Goal Difference. Head to head resolved via overall Goal Difference.)	
6	Angoulême	26	10	7	9	33	32	+1	37	
7	Blois	26	10	7	9	37	35	+2	37	
8	Bourges	26	11	4	11	30	38	−8	37	
9	Les Herbiers	26	9	10	7	37	28	+9	37	
10	Saumur	26	9	7	10	37	36	+1	34	Spared from relegation
11	Romorantin (R)	26	9	6	11	33	38	−5	33	Relegation to National 3
12	Avoine Chinon (R)	26	6	8	12	23	38	−15	26	Relegation to National 3
13	Trélissac (R)	26	3	12	11	25	42	−17	21	Relegation to National 3
14	Angers (res) (R)	26	2	7	17	19	46	−27	13	Relegation to National 3

Source: soccerway
Rules for classification: 1) points; 2) head-to-head results; 3) head-to-head goal difference; 4) goal difference; 5) number of goals scored; 6) fair play points; 7) draw
(C) Champions; (D) Disqualified; (P) Promoted; (R) Relegated

=== Group C ===
Pos	Team	Pld	W	D	L	GF	GA	GD	Pts	Promotion or relegation
1	Boulogne (C, P)	26	15	6	5	48	29	+19	51	Promotion to National
2	Saint-Malo	26	12	8	6	38	23	+15	44	
3	Granville	26	12	7	7	35	31	+4	43	
4	Chambly (Note: On 3 January 2024 it was announced that Chambly had been deducted five points by the DNCG due to financial mismanagement.)	26	12	7	7	39	25	+14	38 (Note: Head to head, Chambly vs Dinan Léhon. Chambly 4 points, Dinan Léhon 1 point.)	
5	Dinan Léhon	26	11	5	10	41	44	−3	38	
6	Stade Briochin	26	10	7	9	31	26	+5	37 (Note: Head to head, Stade Briochin vs Beauvais. Briochin 3 points, +1 Goal Difference, Beauvais 3 points, -1 Goal Difference.)	
7	Beauvais	26	10	7	9	38	31	+7	37	
8	Aubervilliers	26	11	3	12	30	39	−9	36	
9	Châteaubriant	26	8	10	8	29	31	−2	34 (Note: Head to head, Châteaubriant vs Racing Club. Châteaubriant 4 points, Racing Club 1 point.)	
10	Racing Club (R)	26	10	4	12	30	35	−5	34	Relegation to National 3
11	Lorient (res) (R)	26	8	8	10	36	39	−3	32	Relegation to National 3
12	Borgo (R)	26	9	3	14	37	49	−12	30	Relegation to National 3
13	Vire (R)	26	8	3	15	35	43	−8	27	Relegation to National 3
14	Guingamp (res) (R)	26	6	2	18	28	50	−22	20	Relegation to National 3

Source: soccerway
Rules for classification: 1) points; 2) head-to-head results; 3) head-to-head goal difference; 4) goal difference; 5) number of goals scored; 6) fair play points; 7) draw
(C) Champions; (P) Promoted; (R) Relegated

=== Group D ===
Pos	Team	Pld	W	D	L	GF	GA	GD	Pts	Promotion or relegation
1	Bourg-Péronnas (Note: On 5 December 2023 it was announced that Bourg-Péronnas had been deducted three points by the DNCG for financial mismanagement.) (C, P)	26	16	5	5	48	25	+23	50	Promotion to National
2	Fleury	26	13	7	6	44	21	+23	46	
3	Furiani-Agliani	26	10	13	3	31	18	+13	43	
4	FC 93	26	10	12	4	39	30	+9	42	
5	Créteil	26	10	7	9	30	29	+1	37	
6	Biesheim	26	9	8	9	29	34	−5	35	
7	Wasquehal	26	9	7	10	35	39	−4	34 (Note: Head to head, Wasquehal vs Feignies Aulnoye. Wasquehal 3 points, 0 Goal Difference, Feignies Aulnoye 3 points, 0 Goal Difference. Head to head resolved via overall number of goals scored.)	
8	Feignies Aulnoye	26	9	7	10	28	32	−4	34	
9	Haguenau	26	9	5	12	32	47	−15	32	Spared from relegation
10	Colmar (R)	26	9	4	13	35	41	−6	31	Relegation to National 3
11	Auxerre (res) (R)	26	8	6	12	32	32	0	30	Relegation to National 3
12	Mâcon (R)	26	6	10	10	34	37	−3	28	Relegation to National 3
13	Racing Besançon (R)	26	6	7	13	26	34	−8	25	Relegation to National 3
14	Saint-Quentin (R)	26	6	6	14	37	61	−24	24	Relegation to National 3

Source: soccerway
Rules for classification: 1) points; 2) head-to-head results; 3) head-to-head goal difference; 4) goal difference; 5) number of goals scored; 6) fair play points; 7) draw
(C) Champions; (P) Promoted; (R) Relegated

== Top scorers ==
As of 29 February 2024.

Rank	Player	Club	Goals
1	(Senegal) Abdoulaye Diallo	Toulon	12
2	(France) Amine Meftah	Aubervilliers	10
2	(France) Florent Stevance	Saint-Quentin	10
4	(France) Romain Escarpit	Bergerac	9
4	(France) Sébastien Da Silva	Borgo	9
6	(France) Sander Benbachir	Hyères	8
6	(France) Jordan Popineau	Romorantin	8
6	(France) Vincent Créhin	Granville	8
6	(France) Mamadou Diallo	Boulogne	8
6	(France) Sofian Valla	Dinan Léhon FC	8
6	(France) Jean Vercruysse	Boulogne	8
6	(France) Farid Beziouen	FC 93	8
6	(France) Maxime Blé	Racing Besançon	8
6	(France) Alain Reppert	Biesheim	8
