= Championnat National 2 =

French football league

- Organising body: FFF
- Founded: 1993; 33 years ago
- Country: France
- Confederation: UEFA
- Number of clubs: 112 (8 groups of 14)
- Level on pyramid: 5
- Promotion to: National 1
- Relegation to: Régional 1
- Domestic cup: Coupe de France
- Current champions: Hauts Lyonnais (2025–26)
- Website: fff.fr/championnats
- Current: 2026–27 Championnat National 2

The Championnat National 2, commonly referred to as simply National 2 and formerly known as Championnat de France Amateur 2 and Championnat National 3, is a football league competition. The league serves as the fifth division of the French football league system behind Ligue 1, Ligue 2, Ligue 3, and the National 1. Usually contested by 112 clubs, the Championnat National 3 operates on a system of promotion and relegation with the Championnat National 1 and the regional leagues of the Division d'Honneur, the sixth division of French football. Seasons run from August to May, with teams in eight groups playing 26 games each totalling 1,456 games in the season. Most games are played on Saturdays and Sundays, with a few games played during weekday evenings. Play is regularly suspended the last weekend before Christmas for two weeks before returning in the second week of January.

The competition was founded in 1993 as National 3 and lasted for five years before being converted to Championnat de France Amateur 2 in 1998. In 2017, the FFF reorganised amateur football and the restructured 5th level again became Championnat National 3. In 2026, Championnat National 3 became Championnat National 2. Some clubs that participate in the league are semi-professional. The matches in the league attract on average between 200 and 400 spectators per match.

== History and format ==
The amateur championship of France was created in 1993 under the name National 3, replacing the former Division 4. The league's debut coincided with the creation of the Championnat National, the third division of French football, which is commonly known as National. For the first three years of the competition, an amateur champion was crowned in France regardless of whether the club was amateur or a reserve team.

In 1998 the competition was renamed Championnat de France Amateur 2 as part of a restructuring of Amateur football. In this guise, the competition saw 112 clubs participate, split into eight parallel groups of 14 with their group affiliation being based on the regional location of the club. The league became open to reserve teams in France and amateur clubs in France and both were eligible for promotion to the Championnat de France Amateur.

=== 2017 to 2023 format ===
In 2017 the FFF reorganised amateur football along the lines of the 2016 reorganisation of the Regions of France, creating Championnat National 2 and Championnat National 3 to replace CFA and CFA2. For National 2 this was in effect just a change of name, whilst National 3 saw a major restructure. This new competition sees 168 clubs participating, in twelve parallel groups directly aligned to the thirteen new regions (Corsica is merged with Provence-Alpes-Côte d'Azur to form a Méditerranee-Corse group). The administration of the league is devolved to the regional leagues on a group by group basis, with the exception of the Méditerranee-Corse group, which is directly managed by the FFF.

During the course of a season, usually from August to May, each club plays the others in their respective group twice, once at their home stadium and once at that of their opponents, for a total of 26 games. Teams are ranked by total points. Ties between clubs with equal points are resolved by: a) points gained in games between the two (or more) clubs, b) goal difference in games between the two (or more) clubs, c) overall goal difference, d) goals scored, e) best disciplinary record, f) drawing of lots.

At the end of each season, the winner of each group was promoted to what was then Championnat National 2. If a group winner was prevented from being promoted, or elected not to be promoted, they were replaced by the next best team in the group who were eligible. At a minimum the bottom three teams in each group were relegated to the Regional league's top division. In the case of groups which started a season with more than 14 teams, extra relegation places were added in order to get the league back to 14 teams for the following season. Which groups were given extra relegation places was also dependent on which regions teams relegated from the fourth tier belonged to.

=== Uncompleted seasons ===
Two consecutive seasons, 2019–20 and 2020–21, were not completed due to the COVID-19 pandemic in France. Standings of the 2019–20 season were finalised based on points per game, whilst the 2020–21 season was declared void.

=== Restructuring ===
As part of the restructuring of the French football league system by the French Football Federation between 2022 and 2026, the league was gradually restructured over three seasons from the pre-2023 structure of 168 teams (12 groups of 14) to 154 teams (11 groups of 14) in 2023–24. Future seasons will see 140 teams (10 groups of 14) in 2024–25 and 112 teams (8 groups of 14) in 2025–26.

This change in structure moved the competition away from groups that directly related to the regional leagues that feed Championnat National 3, and also brought the competition back under the direct control of the FFF.

The league changed name to Championnat National 2 ahead of the 2026–27 season, as part of the FFF's decision that also saw Championnat National change name to Ligue 3 and former Championnat National 2 change name to Championnat National 1.

== Current teams (2026–27) ==
Group A	Group B	Group C	Group D
Blagnac FC; FC Bassin d'Arcachon; Castanéenne FC; AS Chamalièrs; AS Colomiers; Gazinet-Cestas; US Lège-Cap-Ferret; Les Genêts d'Anglet; Mérignac-Arlac; Onet-le-Château Football; Pau FC 2; Rodez AF 2; Toulouse FC 2; Trélissac-Antonne	US Alençonnaise; Avoine OCC; FC Challans; US Chauvigny; La Châtaigneraie; Le Mans 2; Les Sables VF; FC Nantes 2; AS Panazol; US Philibertine; Sablé FC; Stade Lavallois 2; Vendée Fontenay Foot; USSA Vertou	ASPTT Caen; SM Caen 2; OC Cesson; AS Ginglin-Cesson; EA Guingamp 2; Lannion FC; SP Milizac; TA Rennes; FC Saint-Lô Manche; Stade Brestois 2; Stade Rennais 2; Vannes OC; AF Virois; AS Vitré	FC Balagne; SC Bastia 2; C' Chartres Football; IC Croix; Lille 2; CMS Oissel; Olympique Saint-Quentin; Red Star 2; Saint Amand FC; AS Saint-Ouen-l'Aumône; AS Steenvoorde; AS Trouville-Deauville-Villers; FC Versailles 2; US Vimy
Group E	Group F	Group G	Group H
FCM Aubervilliers; ASM Belfort; JA Drancy; US Ivry; FC Metz 2; APM Metz; FC Mulhouse; Nancy Lorraine 2; SFC Neuilly-sur-Marne; Olympique Charleville AM; Sochaux-Montbéliard 2; RC Strasbourg 2; ES Thaon; US Torcy	FC Annecy 2; Racing Besançon; FC Bourgoin-Jallieu; FC Chalon; ASPTT Dijon-Bourgogne; Dijon FCO 2; US Feurs; Is-Selongey Football; Jura Dolois Football; Mâcon 71; Olympique Lyon 2; CA Pontarlier; Thonon Évian F.C.; FC Vesoul	AS Atlas Paillade; Berre SC; ES Cannet Rocheville; FC Espaly; ES Fosséenne; GC Lucciana; US Mandelieu-La Napoule; Montpellier 2; Olympique d'Alès; Olympique Marseille 2; Riviera FC; FC Rousset SVO; Stade Beaucairois FC; Saint-Étienne 2	GFC Ajaccio; AJ Auxerre 2; Blois Football 41; CS Brétigny; LB Châteauroux 2; USC Corte; ESA Linas-Montlhéry; US Orléans 2; Paris FC 2; SF Romorantin; Sainte-Geneviève FC; FC Saint-Jean-le-Blanc; Vierzon FC

== Performance ==
=== Titles per group ===
8 groups (1993-2017)

National 3
Season	Group A	Group B	Group C	Group D	Group E	Group F	Group G	Group H
1993-1994	AS Beauvais B	Le Mans UC 72 B	CS Blénod	Angers SCO B	Clermont Foot	Olymp. Thonon Chablais	FC Bergerac	FC Martigues B
1994-1995	Red Star FC B	Paris SG C	FC Sens	Stade lavallois B	SO Romorantin	RC Lons-le-Saunier	AFC Aurillac	ES Vitrolles
1995-1996	Olympique Saint-Quentin	Amiens SC B	ASC Biesheim	RC La Flèche	LB Châteauroux B	AC Ajaccio	Montauban FC	Stade beaucairois
1996-1997	JA Armentières	US Moissy-Cramayel	AC Troyes B	FC Lorient B	VF Fontenay	FC Gueugnon B	Borgo FC	FC Bourg-Péronnas
Championnat de France Amateur 2
Season	Group A	Group B	Group C	Group D	Group E	Group F	Group G	Group H
1997-1998	Calais RUFC	FC Les Lilas	Stade de Reims	Le Mans UC 72 B	LB Châteauroux B	AJ Auxerre C	AS Porto Vecchio	ASOA Valence B
1998-1999	AC Cambrai	SS L'Hôpital	AJ Auxerre C	AC arlésien	ES Vitrolles	FC Libourne-Saint-Seurin	Le Mans UC 72 B	OG Rouen
1999-2000	Levallois SC	FCSR Haguenau	FC Sochaux-Montbéliard B	AS Saint-Étienne B	RCO Agde	FC Saint-Médard	FC Nantes B	USON Mondeville
2000-2001	SC Abbeville	Red Star FC B	USFC Vesoul	SC Bastia B	US Endoume	ESA Brive	EA Guingamp B	Entente SSG
2001-2002	Amiens SC B	US Sénart-Moissy	FC Sochaux-Montbéliard B	US Saint-Georges	Stade raphaëlois	Girondins de Bordeaux B	FC Lorient B	RC La Flèche
2002-2003 (Note: The champion was US Roye, second of group B.)	Calais RUFC	AJ Auxerre C	SC Schiltigheim	Gap HAFC	Sporting Toulon Var	Aviron bayonnais	Stade poitevin	US Concarneau
2003-2004	US Lesquin	CO Châlons	SAS Épinal	AS Yzeure	US Le Pontet	Rodez AF	USJA Carquefou	USON Mondeville
2004-2005	SC Feignies	Dijon FCO B	FC Gueugnon B	SO Cassis Carnoux	US Luzenac	Le Mans UC 72 B	AS Vitré	Villemomble Sports
2005-2006 (Note: The champion was US Concarneau, second of group H.)	Red Star FC	RC Épernay Champagne	Vesoul HSC	Nîmes Olympique B	CA Bastia	Stade bordelais	Les Herbiers VF	SM Caen B
2006-2007	Valenciennes FC B	ASM Belfort	ASF Andrézieux-Bouthéon	Hyères FC	Fontenay VF	RC France 92	La Vitréenne FC	SM Caen B
2007-2008	Olympique Noisy-le-Sec	ES Troyes AC B	FC Villefranche Beaujolais	RCO Agde	Chamois niortais B	Luçon VF	Stade quimpérois	UJA Alfortville
2008-2009 (Note: The champion was FC Bourg-Péronnas, second of group D.)	AS Marck	JA Drancy	SAS Épinal	Grenoble Foot 38 B	Stade raphaëlois	Toulouse Fontaines	Tours FC B	USJA Carquefou
2009-2010	Calais RUFC	FCM Aubervilliers	FC Metz B	Monts d'Or Azergues	AS Monaco B	AS Béziers	Le Poiré-sur-Vie VF	FC Lorient B
2010-2011	AC Amiens	Calais RUFC	RC Strasbourg B	SO Chambéry	FC Calvi	Stade montois	Olympique de Saumur	GSI Pontivy
2011-2012	FC Chambly Thelle	US Roye	RC Strasbourg	FC Montceau Bourgogne	Grenoble Foot 38	Stade bordelais	Trélissac FC	US Saint-Malo
2012-2013	FC Dieppe	Entente SSG	Vesoul HSF	AS Saint-Priest	OGC Nice B	Jeunesse villenavaise	FC Nantes B	AS Vitré
2013-2014	Arras FA	IC Croix	FC Metz B	AS Saint-Étienne B	FC Sète 34	Montpellier HSC B	US Fleury-Mérogis	FC Lorient B
2014-2015 (Note: The champion was SC Toulon-Le Las, second of group G.)	Voltigeurs de Châteaubriant	SO Cholet	AC Boulogne-Billancourt	ES Wasquehal	AJ Auxerre B	Le Puy Foot 43 Auvergne	Olympique de Marseille B	Bergerac Périgord FC
2015-2016	Stade rennais FC B	FC Chartres	ES Paulhan-Pézenas	Sporting Toulon Var	ASF Andrézieux-Bouthéon	Stade de Reims B	Lille OSC B	Le Havre AC B
2016-2017	Stade briochin	St-Pryvé St-Hilaire FC	AS Beauvais Oise	RC Strasbourg Alsace B	Sainte-Geneviève Sports	AS Saint-Priest	RC Grasse	Stade bordelais

12 regional groups (2017-2023)

Between 2017 et 2023, regional leagues organize their respective group, except for the Corse-Méditerranée group, which stays under the direction of the national federation.

National 3
Season	AuRA	BFC	Bzh	Centre	Gd Est	HdF	IdF	Norm.	Nle-Aq.	Occ.	PdL	Cor.-Médi.
2017-2018	AS Saint-Étienne B	CA Pontarlier	Vannes OC	Blois Foot 41	FCSR Haguenau	Entente Feignies Aulnoye FC	AF Bobigny	CMS Oissel	Girondins de Bordeaux B	Nîmes Olympique B	FC Nantes B	US Endoume
2018-2019	FC Chamalières	Dijon FCO B	EA Guingamp B	Bourges Foot	FC Mulhouse	Olympique Saint-Quentin	FC Gobelins	FC Rouen	Angoulême CFC	Montpellier HSC B	Angers SCO B	SC Bastia
2019-2020 (Note: The title is not attributed in 2019-2020 due to the COVID-19 pandemic.)	GFA Rumilly-Vallières	AJ Auxerre B	Stade plabennécois	Tours FC	FC Metz B	AS Beauvais Oise	FC Versailles 78	SM Caen B	Stade montois	Canet Roussillon FC	Voltigeurs de Châteaubriant	Athlético Marseille
2020-2021	Season cancelled due to the COVID-19 pandemic.											
2021-2022	Thonon Évian GGFC	Racing Besançon	Stade rennais FC 2	Vierzon FC	SR Colmar	Wasquehal Football	Racing CFF	Évreux FC FC	Stade bordelais	Olympique d'Alès	Olympique de Saumur	AS Furiani-Agliani
2022-2023	FC Bourgoin-Jallieu	UF Mâconnais	Dinan-Léhon FC	Avoine OCC	ASC Biesheim	Entente Feignies Aulnoye FC	FCM Aubervilliers	AF Virois	FC Libourne	AS Béziers	La Roche VF	AS Cannes

Transition period (2023-2025)

From the 2023-2024 season onwards, the championship is taken over by the federation. It is initially reduced to 11 groupes, then 10 in 2024-2025, aiming for an 8-group-championship in 2025-2026.

National 3
Season	Group A	Group B	Group C	Group D	Group E	Group F	Group G	Group H	Group I	Group J	Group K
2023-2024	Istres FC	Genêts d'Anglet	Stade Poitevin	Le Poiré-sur-Vie VF	SC Locminé	AS Villers-Houlgate	US Chantilly	FC Balagne	US Thionville Lusitanos	GFA Rumilly-Vallières	AS Saint-Priest
2024-2025	Aviron bayonnais	FC Chauray	FC Lorient B	FC Borgo	FC dieppois	FC Montlouis	US Lusitanos Saint-Maur	SR Colmar	FC Limonest DSD	FC Rousset SVO	

8 groups (since 2025)

National 3
Season	Group A	Group B	Group C	Group D	Group E	Group F	Group G	Group H
2025-2026	Tarbes PF	Vendée Poiré Foot	GSI Pontivy	Racing CFF	LOSC Lille B	ESTAC Troyes B	Hauts Lyonnais	Lyon-La Duchère
National 2
Season	Group A	Group B	Group C	Group D	Group E	Group F	Group G	Group H
2026-2027	TBD	TBD	TBD	TBD	TBD	TBD	TBD	TBD

Legend

Club named champion by the federation
