= Union Foot de Touraine =

French soccer club

Union Foot de Touraine is a French soccer club founded in 2009 and based in Ballan-Miré, in the department of Indre-et-Loire.

The club, originally established through a merger under the name Football Club de l'Ouest tourangeau, changed its name in 2025 following the dissolutions of Tours Football Club and Joué-lès-Tours Football Club Touraine, as the organization was set to expand its activities into the cities of Tours and Joué-lès-Tours. The club takes its name from the historic province of Touraine.

== History ==
=== FC Ouest Tourangeau (2009–2025) ===
Football Club de l'Ouest Tourangeau (FCOT) was created in June 2009 following the merger of US Ballan and SC Savonnières, two clubs from the Tours metropolitan area that had both been founded in 1957. The new club advanced through the regional divisions and eventually reached the CFA2 (now National 3) in 2017, managing to stay in that division and stabilize there until the 2024–2025 season.

During this period, FCOT found itself competing against its neighbor and rival, Tours FC, for promotion to National 2 during the 2022–2023 National 3 season.

=== Name change to UF Touraine (2025–) ===
The history of Union Foot de Touraine is tied to the end of that of Tours FC, the main club from the Touraine region and a notable Ligue 2 side, where it played continuously from the 2007–2008 season to the 2017–2018 season. Relegated on sporting grounds to the National for the 2018–2019 season, then both sportingly and administratively to National 3 for 2019–2020, and once again administratively to Régional 1 in 2020–2021, Tours FC has lingered for several seasons at the amateur level, fluctuating between Régional 1 and National 3. After an excellent start to the 2024–2025 season in Régional 1 under Bryan Bergougnoux former TFC player who returned as head coach and a strong run in the Coupe de France, albeit marked by the fiasco of the home match against Lorient in December, the SASP Tours FC was liquidated in January, as the club was unable to meet its financial obligations to both creditors and employees.

In February 2025, the French Football Federation decided not to reallocate any sporting rights to the Tours FC association, whose teams were all excluded from their respective leagues. This decision effectively marked the disappearance of the club and brought an end to years of accumulating debt during the presidency of Jean-Marc Ettori.

From that point on, already supporting the Tours FC association at the time of the SASP’s liquidation in January 2025, Basile Riboud grandson of the founder of the Danone industrial group and son of Franck Riboud expressed his desire to form a metropolitan club that would bring together the best clubs from Tours and its surrounding area (following the disappearance of Tours FC as well as Joué-lès-Tours Football Club Touraine in 2024).

The option ultimately chosen involved creating a new club based on an already existing structure in the area: Football Club de l'Ouest Tourangeau (FCOT). The name change from Football Club de l'Ouest Tourangeau to Union Foot de Touraine was approved during an extraordinary general meeting of the association and received the support of Basile Riboud.

Thus, the club succeeded FCOT, competing in National 3 during the 2024–2025 season. As a result, Union Football de Touraine continued in National 3 for the 2025–2026 season, with former FCOT coach Hervé Loubat appointed to the bench. The club also drew on the expertise of figures such as Christophe Fayard, who played several seasons in Ligue 2, and Olivier Pickeu former Tours FC player (1990–1991), former sporting director of Angers SCO (2006–2020), and president of Stade Malherbe Caen (2020–2024) who assumed the role of general manager starting on September 1, 2025. At the beginning of the 2025–2026 season, UFT was the second-ranked club in Indre-et-Loire, just behind FC Montlouis, which played in National 2.

From the outset, the club aimed to build connections with its local supporter base, allowing the community to vote on social media for the club’s colors and its inaugural logo. The logo intentionally incorporates certain elements from Tours FC such as the fleur-de-lis, the “V”-shaped stripes at the bottom of the crest, and the blue color as well as elements from FCOT and Joué-lès-Tours FCT (the yellow color).

On October 26, following negotiations, UFT began playing at the Stade de la Vallée du Cher. Their first match in the stadium took place on November 1, 2025, resulting in a 2–0 victory against Les Sables VF.

In its inaugural season, the club reached the eighth round of the Coupe de France, where it was eliminated by ESTAC Troyes (a 2–0 defeat) at the Stade de la Vallée du Cher, in front of more than 6,500 spectators.

== Club personalities ==
The main prominent figure of the club is Basile Riboud, grandson of the founder of the Danone industrial group and son of Franck Riboud, who is implementing the project to merge metropolitan clubs around Tours following the disappearance of Tours FC. To do so, he is supported by Olivier Pickeu, the general manager of UFT. Antoine Fins, president of FCOT, remains president of Union Foot de Touraine; coach Hervé Loubat also remains in his position.

Furthermore, Basile Riboud has surrounded himself with several investors who are contributing to a project that ultimately aims to bring UFT up to the professional level. Riboud has called upon the network of his father, Franck Riboud, who had previously been behind the creation of Évian Thonon Gaillard, which competed at the professional level from 2011 to 2015. As a result, several notable figures from the football world have committed themselves to UFT: among the club’s shareholders are individuals such as Zinedine Zidane, Sébastien Bazin (former president of Paris Saint-Germain and CEO of the Accor Group), Christophe Chenut (former president of Stade de Reims), and Frédéric Giscard d’Estaing (grandson of the President of the Republic).

== Club structures ==
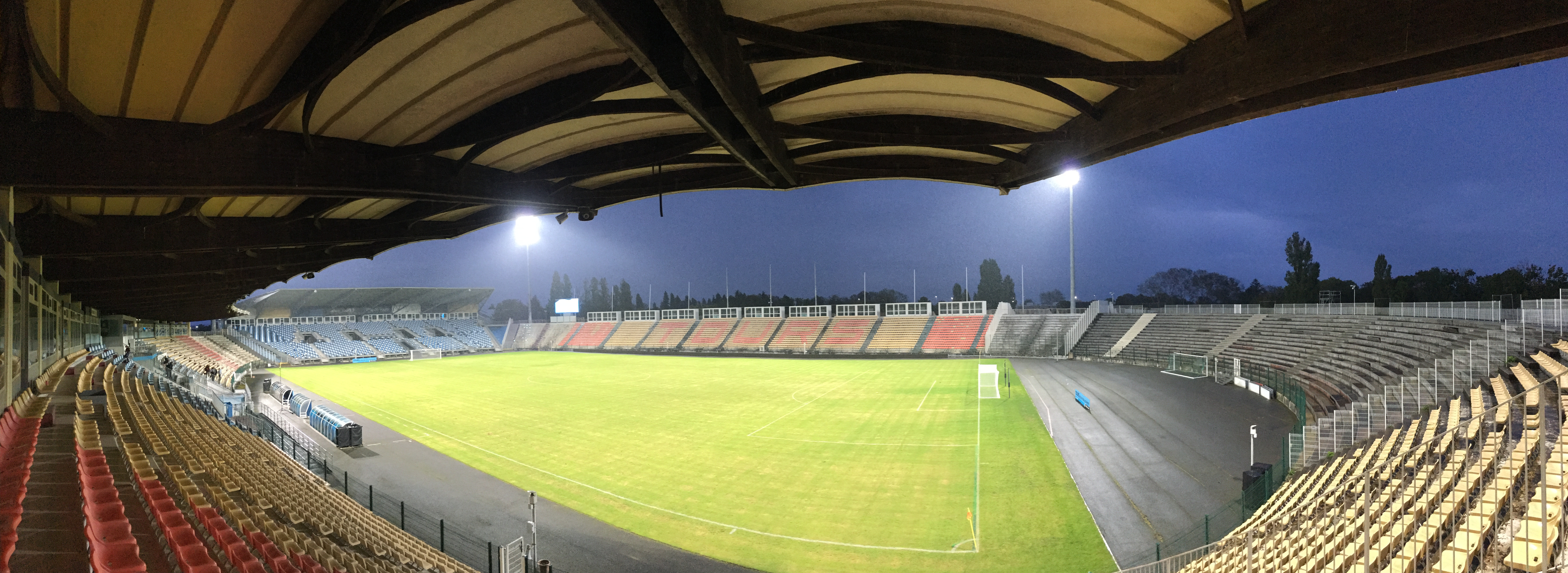
Stade de la Vallée du Cher, where UFT plays its home matches.

On October 26, following negotiations, UFT began playing at the Stade de la Vallée du Cher. Their first match in the stadium took place on November 1, 2025, resulting in a 2–0 victory against Les Sables VF. However, the club’s headquarters remain, for the time being, in Ballan-Miré, the former base of FCOT.
