= Entente Sportive du Mont Gaillard =

- Full name: Entente Sportive du Mont Gaillard
- Founded: 1976
- Ground: Stade Du Mont Gaillard
- Capacity: 1,000
- Chairman: Hamady Sidibé
- Manager: Mikaël Eudes
- League: Régional 3
Home colours

Entente Sportive du Mont Gaillard is a French football club based in Le Havre. They are currently playing at the Régional 3 level.

== History ==
The club began life in 1976. The club played in the local, departmental and regional leagues until the end of the 2021-22 campaign, where upon finishing runners up in the Regional league were promoted to the Championnat National 3, the fifth tier of the French football league system. However they could only survive one season in the National 3 and were relegated back again to the Regional league.

== Ground ==
The club play their home games at the Stade Du Mont Gaillard. The stadium is a multisport complex, used for both football and athletics. The stadium has a capacity of 1,000.
