= US Vimy =

French football club

- Full name: Union Sportive Vimy
- Founded: 1932
- Ground: Stade de la Mine, Vimy
- Capacity: 2,000
- Chairman: Nathalie Cockenpot
- Manager: Sébastien Léraillé
- League: Championnat National 3 Group G
- 2022–23: Championnat National 3 Group I, 8th
- Website: https://www.usvimy.fr/

Union Sportive Vimy is a French football club located in Vimy, France.

== History ==
US Vimy was founded in 1932, and spent most of their history in amateur and semi-pro leagues in France. They were promoted into the Championnat National 3 for the first time in their history for the 2019–20 season.

== Colours and badge ==
The club colours are sky blue.

== Current squad ==
As of 12 February 2022

Note: Flags indicate national team as defined under FIFA eligibility rules; some limited exceptions apply. Players may hold more than one non-FIFA nationality.

No.	Pos.	Nation	Player
—	GK	FRA	Laurely Birba
—	GK	FRA	Mateo Carapella
—	GK	FRA	Julien Dupont
—	GK	FRA	Tanguy Vincent
—	DF	FRA	Souleymane Faye
—	DF	FRA	Aaron Leganase
—	DF	FRA	Maxime Louchart
—	DF	FRA	Christopher Tafer
—	DF	FRA	Quentin Wiart
—	DF	FRA	Abou Fofana
—	DF	FRA	Julien Lestienne
—	DF	FRA	Thomas Secleppe
—	DF	FRA	Clément Victoor
—	MF	FRA	Elias Benslimane
—	MF	FRA	Sofian Charriere
—	MF	FRA	Vincent Denizart
—	MF	FRA	Samir Krim
—	MF	FRA	Jose Machado
—	MF	FRA	Mouhamed Ouattara

No.	Pos.	Nation	Player
—	MF	FRA	Maxence Burgeat
—	MF	FRA	Jean-François Christophe
—	MF	FRA	Moustapha Diaby
—	MF	FRA	Théo Lemattre
—	MF	CMR	Roger N'Dogo
—	MF	FRA	Gael Robail
—	MF	GAB	Merlin Tandjigora
—	MF	FRA	Mohamed Salmi
—	FW	HAI	Gary Ambroise
—	FW	FRA	Lucas Delforge
—	FW	FRA	Julien Kostrzewa
—	FW	FRA	Jawed Nejda
—	FW	FRA	Fethi Terbéche
—	FW	FRA	Abdourahamane Condé
—	FW	GER	Joshua Kapenda
—	FW	GAB	Heredia Mayombo
—	FW	CMR	Hervé Ngan
—	FW	FRA	Sylvain Willot
—	DF	FRA	Bradley Diallo

== Honours ==
- Régional 1: 2018-19
