= Entente Feignies Aulnoye FC =

French football club

Entente Feignies Aulnoye
- Full name: Entente Feignies Aulnoye Football Club
- Short name: EFAFC
- Founded: 1951; 75 years ago
- Stadium: Complexe Sportif Didier Eloy
- Capacity: 1,500 (300 seated)
- Manager: Jean Antunès
- League: National 2 Group C
- 2023–24: National 2 Group D, 8th of 14
- Website: asaulnoye-aymeriesfoot-footeo.footeo.com
Home colours	Away colours

Entente Feignies Aulnoye Football Club is a football club based in Feignies, France. Founded in 1951 as Sporting Club de Feignies, the club plays in the National 2, the fourth tier in the French football league system, after winning promotion in the 2022–23 Championnat National 3 season.

== History ==
Sporting Club de Feignies was founded in 1951.

Feignies had a run of promotions in the first decade of the 21st century. As recently as 1999, they were playing in regional divisions at the ninth tier of French football, rising to the fourth tier of the French leagues, the Championnat de France Amateurs in 2005, where they played one season.

In the summer of 2016 SC Feignies merged with neighbouring side AS Aulnoye-Aymeries, who were relegated from CFA 2 at the end of the 2015–16 season, to form the current club.

In the round of 64 of the 2021–22 Coupe de France, Feignies Aulnoye met Ligue 1 giants Paris Saint-Germain. The match, played at the Stade du Hainaut in Valenciennes, ended in a 3–0 victory for the Parisians. Four years later, Feignies Aulnoye travelled to Ligue 1 leaders RC Lens in the 2025-26 Coupe de France round of 64, losing 3–1.
