= FCM Aubervilliers =

French football club, based in Paris

Aubervilliers
- Full name: Football Club Municipal d'Aubervilliers
- Founded: 1948; 78 years ago
- Ground: Stade André Karman, Aubervilliers
- Capacity: 2,500
- Chairman: Farid Maachi
- Manager: Rachid Yousef
- League: National 1 Group C
- 2023–24: National 2 Group C, 8th of 14
| Home colours | Away colours |

Football Club Municipal d'Aubervilliers (French pronunciation: [obɛʁvilje]; commonly referred to as Aubervilliers or simply Aubervilliers) is a French association football club based in Aubervilliers, a suburb of Paris. The club was founded in 1948 and currently plays in the Championnat National 1, the fourth level of French football following promotion at the end of the 2022–23 Championnat National 3 season. Aubervilliers plays its home matches at the Stade André Karman located within the city. The stadium is named after former French politician André Karman who was born in the commune. The team is presided over by Farid Maachi and managed by Rachid Yousef.

== Notable players ==
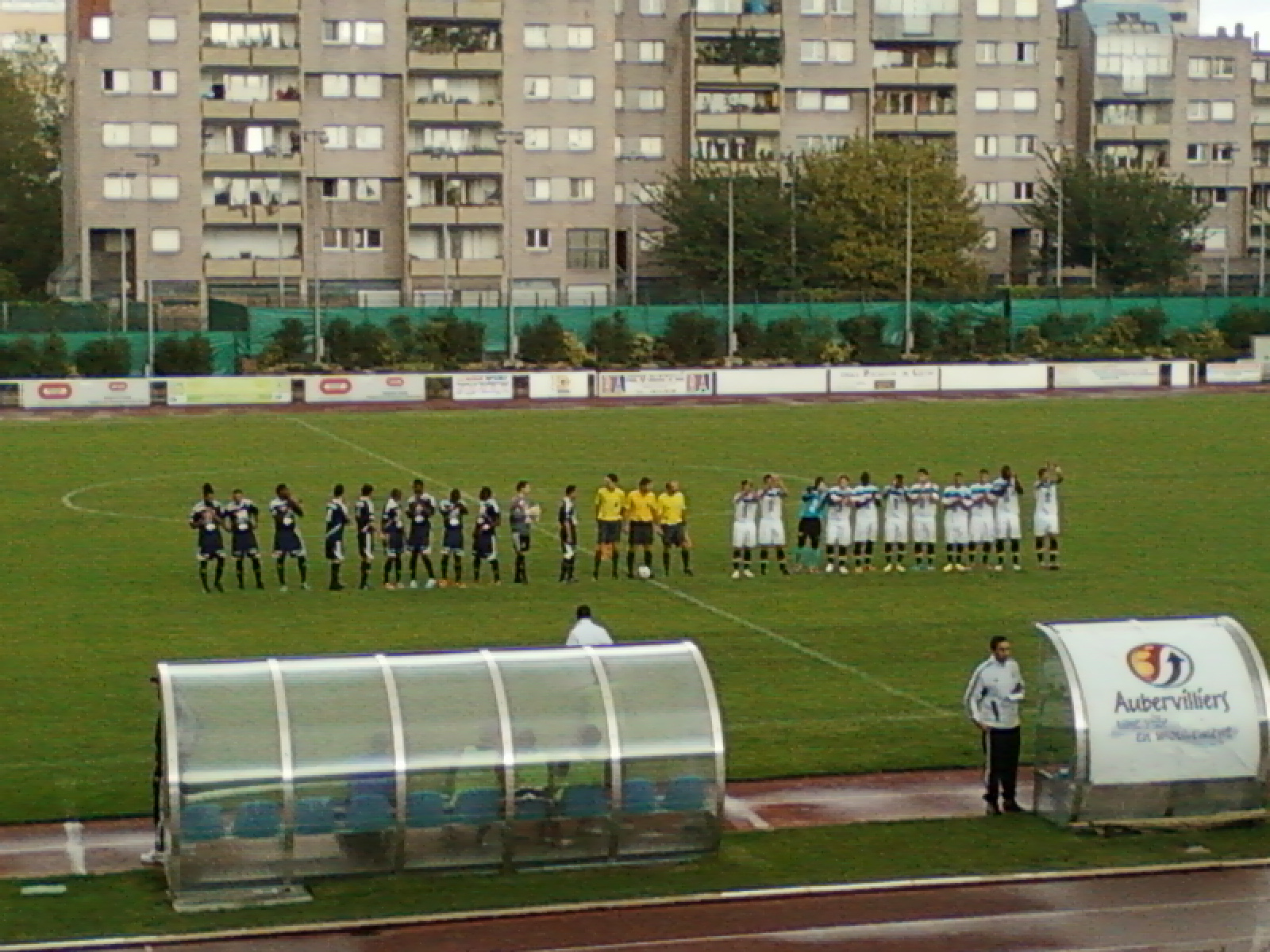
Aubervilliers hosting Lille on 27 August 2011

Below are the current notable players who have either started their careers at Aubervillers or represented the club in league and international competition since the club's foundation in 1948. To appear in the section below, a player must have started their career at the club and later went on to play for their respective national team or played in at least 80 official matches for the club.

For a complete list of Aubervilliers players, see Category:FCM Aubervilliers players.

- (France) Abou Diaby
- (France) Steve Marlet
- (France) Warren Zaïre-Emery (youth)
- (France) Sébastien Michalowski

== Honours ==
- Division 3
  - Winners (1): 1993 (East Group)
- Championnat de France Amateur 2
  - Winners (1): 2010 (Group B)
- Division d'Honneur (Paris Île-de-France)
  - Champions (2): 1990, 2009
