= RC Épernay Champagne =

French football club

Racing Club Épernay Champagne is a French football club based in the commune of Épernay.

The club plays in Régional 1, the sixth tier of French football, after relegation in the 2022–23 Championnat National 3 season. Its kit colours are white and sky blue. It plays its home matches at the Stade Paul Chandon in Épernay.

== History ==
The club was founded in 1906. It played four seasons at the third level of French football in 1970, 1972 and 1975. Since then it has promoted five times as champions from the Division d'Honneur Nord-Est et Champagne-Ardenne (or, most recently, Grand Est), each time enjoying a number of seasons at tier four or five in the national pyramid before being relegated back to the regional division again.

== Notable players ==
- (France) Martin Adeline (youth)

== Honours ==
- Division d'Honneur, Nord-Est et Champagne-Ardenne: 1972, 1975, 2003, 2012, 2017
- Régional 1, Grand Est: 2020
