= ASC Biesheim =

French football club

Biesheim
- Full name: Association Sportive et Culturelle de Biesheim
- Nickname: Petit Poucet (Tom Thumb)
- Founded: 1968; 58 years ago
- Ground: Stade municipal de Biesheim
- Capacity: 500
- Chairman: Vincent Schmitt
- Coach: Vincent Rychen
- League: National 1 Group B
- 2023–24: National 2 Group D, 6th of 14
- Website: https://ascbiesheim-foot.fr/
Home colours	Away colours

Association Sportive et Culturelle de Biesheim (transl. Biesheim Sports and Cultural Association) is a French football club from Biesheim, Haut-Rhin. Founded in 1968, as of the 2026–27 season it competes in the fourth-tier Championnat National 1, Group B, in the French football league system.

== History ==
The team reached the last 32 of the Coupe de France in 2017–18 Coupe de France. There, it hosted Championnat National team Grenoble Foot 38 and lost 3–0 in a penalty shootout after a 2–2 draw on 24 January 2018.

Tournament sponsor PMU named Biesheim the "Petit Poucet" (Tom Thumb) of the competition and rewarded them with their kits for the last 32 match.

== Current squad ==
As of 15 September 2025

Note: Flags indicate national team as defined under FIFA eligibility rules; some limited exceptions apply. Players may hold more than one non-FIFA nationality.

No.	Pos.	Nation	Player
1	GK	FRA	Sacha Cortes
2	DF	FRA	Leandro Alves
4	DF	COD	Glenn Mbimba
5	DF	FRA	Banfa Fofana
6	MF	FRA	Anthony Decherf
7	FW	FRA	Mehdi Mousseni Vincent
8	MF	FRA	Arthur Vallon
9	FW	FRA	Théo Valter
10	MF	FRA	Alexandre Valbon
11	DF	FRA	Mathis Louiserre
14	DF	SEN	Pape Seydou Ba (on loan from Sochaux B)
15	FW	FRA	Alain Reppert

No.	Pos.	Nation	Player
17	MF	FRA	Kadiapome Mendy
19	FW	FRA	Charaf Boutelaa
20	DF	FRA	Joseph Gyeboaho
21	FW	SEN	Babou Seye
22	FW	FRA	Daniel Glao
23	FW	FRA	Rachid Hayef
24	MF	FRA	Mathieu Tahmouch
25	MF	SEN	Pape Yatma Diop (on loan from Sochaux B)
27	DF	FRA	Doel Bonsu
29	DF	FRA	Foday Camara
30	GK	FRA	Jérôme Idir
40	GK	FRA	Axel Gentner
