= 2017–18 Coupe de France preliminary rounds, Corsica =

The 2017–18 Coupe de France preliminary rounds, Corsica make up the qualifying football competition to decide which teams from the French Corsica region take part in the main competition from the seventh round.

== Second round ==
The preliminary rounds in Corsica start with the second round due to the relatively low number of teams competing.

These matches were played on 27 August 2017.

Second round results: Corsica

Tie no	Home team (tier)	Score	Away team (tier)
1.	ASC Pieve di Lota (9)	4–1	AS Squadra Verde (8)
2.	FC Costa Verde (7)	2–1	Prunelli FC (7)

== Third round ==
These matches were played on 9 and 10 September 2017.

Third round results: Corsica

Tie no	Home team (tier)	Score	Away team (tier)
1.	AS Nebbiu Conca d'Oru (6)	1–3	USC Corte (6)
2.	ASC Pieve di Lota (9)	0–1	ÉF Bastia (5)
3.	AS Venacaise (9)	1–4	AS Santa Reparata (8)
4.	CA Propriano (7)	0–3	SC Bastia (5)
5.	AJ Biguglia (6)	2–2 (3–4 p)	AS Casinca (6)
6.	JO Sartenaise (8)	1–0	Olympique Mezzavia FC (9)
7.	AS Antisanti (9)	0–1	Sud FC (6)
8.	FC Squadra Calvi (6)	1–1 (2–3 p)	FC Costa Verde (7)
9.	FC Aleria (6)	4–2 (a.e.t.)	SC Bocognano Gravona (6)
10.	Afa FA (7)	0–4	FC Bastelicaccia (6)
11.	EC Bastiais (8)	6–1	JS Monticello (9)
12.	GC Lucciana (5)	1–0	FB Île-Rousse (5)
13.	AS Luri (9)	0–3	US Ghisonaccia (6)
14.	FC Ajaccio (6)	5–1	JS Bonifacio (7)

== Fourth round ==
These matches were played on 23 and 24 September 2017.

Fourth round results: Corsica

Tie no	Home team (tier)	Score	Away team (tier)
1.	FC Aleria (6)	1–2	AS Furiani-Agliani (4)
2.	ÉF Bastia (5)	0–3	FC Bastia-Borgo (4)
3.	EC Bastiais (8)	0–8	GC Lucciana (5)
4.	AS Santa Reparata (8)	1–0	US Ghisonaccia (6)
5.	Sud FC (6)	1–2	USC Corte (6)
6.	AS Casinca (6)	2–0	FC Ajaccio (6)
7.	FC Bastelicaccia (6)	2–1	FC Costa Verde (7)
8.	JO Sartenaise (8)	0–2	SC Bastia (5)

== Fifth round ==
These matches were played on 7 and 8 October 2017.

Fifth round results: Corsica

Tie no	Home team (tier)	Score	Away team (tier)
1.	AS Furiani-Agliani (4)	2–1 (a.e.t.)	FC Bastia-Borgo (4)
2.	AS Santa Reparata (8)	0–4	GC Lucciana (5)
3.	USC Corte (6)	1–0	FC Bastelicaccia (6)
4.	SC Bastia (5)	4–1	AS Casinca (6)

== Sixth round ==
These matches were played on 21 and 22 October 2017.

Sixth round results: Corsica

Tie no	Home team (tier)	Score	Away team (tier)
1.	AS Furiani-Agliani (4)	1–1 (6–5 p)	SC Bastia (5)
2.	GC Lucciana (5)	4–1	USC Corte (6)
