= 2018–19 Coupe de France preliminary rounds, Corsica =

The 2018–19 Coupe de France preliminary rounds, Corsica was the qualifying competition to decide which teams from the leagues of the Corsica region of France took part in the main competition from the seventh round.

== Second round ==
These matches were played on 1 and 2 September 2018.

Second round results: Corsica
Tie no	Home team (tier)	Score	Away team (tier)
1.	AS Porto-Vecchio (7)	1–2	JS Bonifacio (6)
2.	JO Sartenaise (8)	3–0 (Note: CA Propriano penalised for currently unknown reasons. JO Sartenaise qualify. Original scoreline 1–3 (a.e.t.).)	CA Propriano (7)
3.	JS Monticello (8)	1–0	AS Santa Reparata (7)
4.	Orsu Omessincu (8)	1–2	FC Costa Verde (7)
5.	Afa FA (7)	5–2 (a.e.t.)	Entente Prunelli Ornano Rive Sud (8)
6.	Prunelli FC (7)	4–3	AS Antisanti (8)
7.	AS Luri (8)	1–2	AJ Biguglia (6)
8.	AS Nebbiu Conca d'Oru (6)	2–1	EC Bastiais (7)

== Third round ==
These matches were played on 16 September 2018.

Third round results: Corsica (Note: Three teams in the third round draw were given byes to the fourth round. These were all, by chance, teams that would have entered the competition at the third round stage: SC Bastia, ASC Pieve di Lota and AS Stade Bastiais.)
Tie no	Home team (tier)	Score	Away team (tier)
1.	AJ Biguglia (6)	2–5	USC Corte (6)
2.	AS Casinca (6)	3–2 (a.e.t.)	US Ghisonaccia (6)
3.	JS Bonifacio (6)	3–1	SC Bocognano Gravona (6)
4.	FC Bastelicaccia (5)	2–3	ÉF Bastia (5)
5.	AJ Fiumorbu (9)	0–2	AS Nebbiu Conca d'Oru (6)
6.	AS Venacaise (9)	0–3 (Note: Tie won by forfeit.)	US Vicolaise FC (9)
7.	AS Cargesienne (9)	1–5	Afa FA (7)
8.	FC Balagne (6)	4–0	Prunelli FC (7)
9.	JS Monticello (8)	1–0	Oriente FC (6)
10.	FC Costa Verde (7)	1–4	GC Lucciana (5)
11.	JO Sartenaise (8)	1–0	Sud FC (6)

== Fourth round ==
These matches were played on 30 September 2018.

Fourth round results: Corsica
Tie no	Home team (tier)	Score	Away team (tier)
1.	FC Balagne (6)	0–1	AS Furiani-Agliani (4)
2.	USC Corte (6)	3–0	AS Nebbiu Conca d'Oru (6)
3.	JO Sartenaise (8)	0–3	AS Casinca (6)
4.	Afa FA (7)	0–2	ÉF Bastia (5)
5.	JS Bonifacio (6)	0–8	FC Bastia-Borgo (4)
6.	US Vicolaise FC (9)	1–7	GC Lucciana (5)
7.	JS Monticello (8)	3–1	ASC Pieve di Lota (9)
8.	SC Bastia (5)	10–0	AS Stade Bastiais (9)

== Fifth round ==
These matches were played on 13 and 14 October 2018.

Fifth round results: Corsica
Tie no	Home team (tier)	Score	Away team (tier)
1.	FC Bastia-Borgo (4)	4–2	ÉF Bastia (5)
2.	AS Furiani-Agliani (4)	2–1	GC Lucciana (5)
3.	JS Monticello (8)	1–2	AS Casinca (6)
4.	USC Corte (6)	0–4 (Note: Tie switched due to ongoing work at Stade Armand-Cesari, the ground of SC Bastia)	SC Bastia (5)

== Sixth round ==
These matches were played on 27 and 28 October 2018.

Tie no	Home team (tier)	Score	Away team (tier)
1.	SC Bastia (5)	1–1 (4–2 p)	AS Furiani-Agliani (4)
2.	AS Casinca (6)	0–4	FC Bastia-Borgo (4)
