= 2019–20 Coupe de France preliminary rounds, Corsica =

The 2019–20 Coupe de France preliminary rounds, Corsica was the qualifying competition to decide which teams from the leagues of the Corsica region of France took part in the main competition from the seventh round.

Two teams qualified from the Corsica preliminary rounds. In 2018–19, SC Bastia progressed the furthest in the main competition, reaching the round of 16 before losing to Caen after a penalty shoot-out.

== Schedule ==
The opening round of the qualifying competition, analogous to the second round, took place on 1 September 2019. 14 teams from Régional 1 (tier 6) and below entered at this stage, with 12 given byes to the third round.

The third round draw took place on 5 September 2019. The four teams from Championnat National 3 (tier 5) entered at this stage. One team, Oriente FC, were given a bye to the fourth round.

The fourth round draw took place on 19 September 2019. The single team from Championnat National 2 (tier 4) entered at this stage, and six ties were drawn.

The fifth round draw took place on 3 October 2019. The two teams from Championnat National (tier 3) entered at this stage, and four ties were drawn.

The sixth round draw took place on 17 October 2019, with two ties drawn.

=== Second round ===
The preliminary rounds in Corsica start with the second round due to the relatively low number of teams competing.

These matches were played on 1 September 2019.

Second round results: Corsica
Tie no	Home team (tier)	Score	Away team (tier)
1.	AS Santa Reparata (7)	3–1	JS Monticello (7)
2.	CA Propriano (7)	5–6 (a.e.t.)	AS Porto-Vecchio (6)
3.	FC Costa Verde (7)	0–3	Oriente FC (7)
4.	FC Eccica-Suarella (8)	2–0	AS Cargesienne (8)
5.	ASC Pieve di Lota (8)	2–1	AS Capicorsu (8)
6.	AS Antisanti (8)	0–4	US Ghisonaccia (6)
7.	JS Bonifacio (7)	3–0 (Note: Tie won by means of forfeit.)	JO Sartenaise (none)

=== Third round ===
These matches were played on 15 September 2019.

Third round results: Corsica
Tie no	Home team (tier)	Score	Away team (tier)
1.	AS Santa Reparata (7)	0–4	ÉF Bastia (6)
2.	Sud FC (6)	0–4	GC Lucciana (5)
3.	AS Furiani-Agliani (5)	2–3	AS Casinca (6)
4.	FC Bastelicaccia (6)	4–2 (a.e.t.)	JS Bonifacio (7)
5.	AS Nebbiu Conca d'Oru (6)	0–2	FC Balagne (5)
6.	US Ghisonaccia (6)	2–2 (5–6 p)	SC Bocognano Gravona (6)
7.	US Vicolaise FC (8)	3–4	Afa FA (6)
8.	ASC Pieve di Lota (8)	1–4 (a.e.t.)	AJ Biguglia (6)
9.	Entente Gallia Salines (9)	1–3 (a.e.t.)	FC Eccica-Suarella (8)
10.	USC Corte (6)	4–2 (a.e.t.)	AS Porto-Vecchio (6)

=== Fourth round ===
These matches were played on 29 September 2019.

Fourth round results: Corsica
Tie no	Home team (tier)	Score	Away team (tier)
1.	FC Balagne (5)	3–2 (a.e.t.)	AS Casinca (6)
2.	SC Bocognano Gravona (6)	0–3	SC Bastia (4)
3.	Afa FA (6)	3–2	Oriente FC (7)
4.	FC Eccica-Suarella (8)	0–3	USC Corte (6)
5.	ÉF Bastia (6)	2–1	AJ Biguglia (6)
6.	GC Lucciana (5)	5–1 (a.e.t.)	FC Bastelicaccia (6)

=== Fifth round ===
These matches were played on 12 and 13 October 2019.

Fifth round results: Corsica
Tie no	Home team (tier)	Score	Away team (tier)
1.	Afa FA (6)	0–1	Gazélec Ajaccio (3)
2.	USC Corte (6)	1–3	FC Bastia-Borgo (3)
3.	FC Balagne (5)	3–0	ÉF Bastia (6)
4.	SC Bastia (4)	2–2 (1–3 p)	GC Lucciana (5)

=== Sixth round ===
These matches were played on 26 and 27 October 2019.

Sixth round results: Corsica
Tie no	Home team (tier)	Score	Away team (tier)
1.	FC Balagne (5)	2–4	FC Bastia-Borgo (3)
2.	GC Lucciana (5)	0–3	Gazélec Ajaccio (3)
