= 2025–26 Coupe de France preliminary rounds, Corsica =

The 2025–26 Coupe de France preliminary rounds, Corsica was the qualifying competition to decide which teams from the leagues of the Corsica region of France took part in the main competition from the seventh round.

Two teams qualified from the Corsica preliminary rounds.

In 2024–25, USC Corte progressed to the Round of 64, after hosting Mayotte side Diables Noir in the previous round, and eventually lost narrowly to Ligue 1 side OGC Nice in a penalty shoot-out.

== Draws and fixtures ==
On 7 August 2025, the league announced that 37 teams from the region had entered the competition, and laid out the format of the competition. 19 teams from the second, third and fourth regional divisions would enter at the start of the competition, aligned with the second round of the other region, with nine ties being drawn and one bye being awarded. The 11 teams from Régional 1 and the 3 teams from Championnat National 3 would enter at the third round stage, the 2 teams from Championnat National 2 would enter at the fourth round stage, and the one team from Championnat National would enter at the fifth round stage.

Following the administrative exclusion of AC Ajaccio from the National level of competition on 14 August 2025, and the subsequent decision to place the team at the second regional level, the format of the competition, and the second round draw, had to be reworked, and the results were published on 4 September 2025, along with the third round draw. The revised format saw 20 teams from the second, third and fourth regional divisions entered at the start of the competition, aligned with the second round of the other region, with nine ties being drawn and two byes being awarded. The 11 teams from Régional 1 and the 3 teams from Championnat National 3 would enter at the third round stage, with 11 ties drawn and two byes awarded. The 2 teams from Championnat National 2 would enter at the fourth round stage.

The fourth round draw was published on 18 September 2025. The fifth round draw was published on 2 October 2025. The sixth round draw was published on 16 October 2025.

=== Second round ===
These matches were played on 7 September 2025.

Second Round Results: Corsica
Tie no	Home team (Tier)	Score	Away team (Tier)
1.	AS Capicorsu (8)	2–5	FC Costa Verde (7)
2.	Toga FC Bastia (9)	1–4	AS Antisanti (8)
3.	Ghjuventù Bastiaccia (9)	1–11	FC Ponte-Leccia Morosaglia (9)
4.	AS Cargesienne (7)	1–2	AS Nebbiu Conca d'Oru (7)
5.	FC Lupinu (8)	5–0	Saint-Jean Ajaccio FC (9)
6.	Bigode FC (9)	0–6	AS Ghisonaccia-Prunelli (7)
7.	JS Bonifacio (7)	1–1 (4–2 p)	EC Bastiais (7)
8.	Unione Munticellu Santa-Riparata (7)	8–0	Gazélec FC Bastia-Lucciana (8)
9.	Squadra Lumiaccia (9)	0–3 (Note: Tie won by means of forfeit.)	AS Calinzana (7)

Byes: AS Rocca Taravu (9) and AC Ajaccio (7)

=== Third round ===
These matches were played on 13 and 14 September 2025.

Third Round Results: Corsica
Tie no	Home team (Tier)	Score	Away team (Tier)
1.	JS Bonifacio (7)	1–7	Gazélec Ajaccio (5)
2.	AS Nebbiu Conca d'Oru (7)	0–3	FC Eccica-Suarella (6)
3.	Afa FA (6)	2–3	Sud FC (6)
4.	Squadra Valincu Alta-Rocca Rizzanese (6)	2–2 (1–3 p)	GC Lucciana (5)
5.	SC Bocognano Gravona (6)	2–0	ASC Pieve di Lota (6)
6.	AS Ghisonaccia-Prunelli (7)	1–0	Unione Munticellu Santa-Riparata (7)
7.	FC Costa Verde (7)	0–3	AS Porto-Vecchio (6)
8.	AS Rocca Taravu (9)	0–13	USC Corte (6)
9.	AS Calinzana (7)	2–0	AS Antisanti (8)
10.	FC Lupinu (8)	3–0 (Note: Tie won by means of forfeit.)	AC Ajaccio (7)
11.	FJÉ Biguglia (6)	2–2 (4–5 p)	AS Casinca (6)

Byes: FC Ponte-Leccia Morosaglia (9), FC Balagne (5) and FC Bastelicaccia (6)

=== Fourth round ===
These matches were played on 27 and 28 September 2025, with one postponed to 9 October 2025.

Fourth Round Results: Corsica
Tie no	Home team (Tier)	Score	Away team (Tier)
1.	USC Corte (6)	0–0 (4–2 p)	Sud FC (6)
2.	AS Calinzana (7)	1–6	FC Borgo (4)
3.	GC Lucciana (5)	1–0	AS Casinca (6)
4.	FC Lupinu (8)	1–1 (3–4 p)	Gazélec Ajaccio (5)
5.	FC Ponte-Leccia Morosaglia (9)	0–9	AS Porto-Vecchio (6)
6.	FC Bastelicaccia (6)	1–4	FC Balagne (5)
7.	SC Bocognano Gravona (6)	1–2	AS Ghisonaccia-Prunelli (7)
8.	FC Eccica-Suarella (6)	0–3	AS Furiani-Agliani (4)

=== Fifth round ===
These matches were played on 11 and 12 October 2025.

Fifth Round Results: Corsica
Tie no	Home team (Tier)	Score	Away team (Tier)
1.	FC Borgo (4)	0–2	FC Balagne (5)
2.	AS Ghisonaccia-Prunelli (7)	0–3	USC Corte (6)
3.	AS Porto-Vecchio (6)	0–0 (3–4 p)	AS Furiani-Agliani (4)
4.	Gazélec Ajaccio (5)	3–3 (4–2 p)	GC Lucciana (5)

=== Sixth round ===
These matches were played on 25 October 2025.

Sixth Round Results: Corsica
Tie no	Home team (Tier)	Score	Away team (Tier)
1.	AS Furiani-Agliani (4)	2–1	FC Balagne (5)
2.	USC Corte (6)	1–3	Gazélec Ajaccio (5)
