= 2022–23 Coupe de France preliminary rounds, Corsica =

The 2022–23 Coupe de France preliminary rounds, Corsica is the qualifying competition to decide which teams from the leagues of the Corsica region of France take part in the main competition from the seventh round.

Two teams will qualify from the Corsica preliminary rounds.

In 2021–22, both qualifying teams, FC Bastia-Borgo and Gazélec Ajaccio made it to the eighth round. FC Bastia-Borgo lost at ES Cannet Rocheville, a team from two divisions below them, whilst Gazélec Ajaccio lost to Red Star F.C.

== Draws and fixtures ==
On 18 August 2022, the league announced that a total of 33 teams from the region had entered. At the same time, the structure of the qualifying competition was announced. A preliminary round, analogous to the second round in other regions, featured six clubs, drawn from a twelve entering from Régional 3 and Régional 4. The winners progressed to the third round, where they were joined by all other clubs from Championnat National 3 and below. The draw for the third round was published on 1 September 2022. The draw for the fourth round, which saw the entry of the one Championnat National 2 team from the region, was published on 15 September 2022. The fifth round draw, which saw the entry of the one Championnat National team from the region, was published on 29 September 2022. The sixth round draw was published on 10 October 2022.

=== Second round ===
These matches were played on 4 September 2022.

Second round results: Corsica
Tie no	Home team (tier)	Score	Away team (tier)
1.	AS Cargesienne (8)	3–2	Squadra Lumiaccia (9)
2.	FC Lupinu (9)	1–1 (3–4 p)	EC Bastiais (9)
3.	Entente Gallia Salines (9)	2–7	JS Monticello (8)

=== Third round ===
These matches were played on 10 and 11 September 2022.

Third round results: Corsica
Tie no	Home team (tier)	Score	Away team (tier)
1.	GC Lucciana (5)	2–1	SC Bocognano Gravona (6)
2.	Gazélec Ajaccio (5)	6–0 (Note: Tie reversed from original draw.)	AS Cargesienne (8)
3.	FJÉ Biguglia (6)	0–0 (4–5 p)	Sud FC (7)
4.	FC Costa Verde (7)	0–7	USC Corte (5)
5.	Football Club Ponte-Leccia Morosaglia (9)	0–9	AS Nebbiu Conca d'Oru (6)
6.	JS Monticello (8)	3–2	FC Bastelicaccia (6)
7.	EC Bastiais (9)	1–1 (5–4 p)	FC Eccica-Suarella (7)
8.	AS Porto-Vecchio (7)	1–4	AS Casinca (6)
9.	AS Antisanti (7)	1–3	US Ghisonaccia (6)
10.	Squadra Valincu Alta-Rocca Rizzanese (6)	4–2	FC Balagne (5)
11.	ASC Pieve di Lota (7)	4–0	US Vicolaise FC (8)
12.	US Vezzanaise (9)	0–1	Afa FA (6)
13.	Stade Bastiais (9)	0–3 (Note: Tie won by means of forfeit.)	AS Santa Reparata (7)

=== Fourth round ===
These matches were played on 24 and 25 September 2022.

Fourth round results: Corsica
Tie no	Home team (tier)	Score	Away team (tier)
1.	ASC Pieve di Lota (7)	0–5	AS Furiani-Agliani (4)
2.	AS Casinca (6)	0–4	Gazélec Ajaccio (5)
3.	EC Bastiais (9)	0–3	Sud FC (7)
4.	USC Corte (5)	1–3	GC Lucciana (5)
5.	AS Nebbiu Conca d'Oru (6)	1–1 (3–2 p)	US Ghisonaccia (6)
6.	Afa FA (6)	5–0	AS Santa Reparata (7)
7.	JS Monticello (8)	0–5	Squadra Valincu Alta-Rocca Rizzanese (6)

=== Fifth round ===
These matches were played on 7 and 9 October 2022.

Fifth round results: Corsica
Tie no	Home team (tier)	Score	Away team (tier)
1.	GC Lucciana (5)	3–0	AS Nebbiu Conca d'Oru (6)
2.	AS Furiani-Agliani (4)	0–0 (3–4 p)	FC Borgo (3)
3.	Sud FC (7)	1–1 (10–9 p)	Gazélec Ajaccio (5)
4.	Squadra Valincu Alta-Rocca Rizzanese (6)	2–3	Afa FA (6)

=== Sixth round ===
These matches were played on 16 October 2022.

Sixth round results: Corsica
Tie no	Home team (tier)	Score	Away team (tier)
1.	Afa FA (6)	1–4	FC Borgo (3)
2.	Sud FC (7)	0–3	GC Lucciana (5)
