= 2020–21 Coupe de France preliminary rounds, Corsica =

The 2020–21 Coupe de France preliminary rounds, Corsica was the qualifying competition to decide which teams from the leagues of the Corsica region of France took part in the main competition from the seventh round.

Two teams qualified from the Corsica Preliminary rounds. In 2019–20, FC Bastia-Borgo progressed the furthest in the main competition, reaching the ninth round before losing to Saint-Étienne 0–3.

== Schedule ==
A total of 26 teams entered from the region. The opening round of the qualifying competition, analogous to the second round, took place on 6 September 2020, with six teams from Régional 2 and below entering at this stage. The remaining 16 teams from the Regional divisions, and the three teams from Championnat National 3 entered at the third round stage on 20 September 2020. The fourth round draw, featuring teams from Championnat National 2, took place on 24 September 2020. The fifth round draw, which saw the debut of the teams from Championnat National, took place on 8 October 2020. The sixth round draw was made on 22 October 2020.

=== Second round ===
The Preliminary rounds in Corsica start with the second round due to the relatively low number of teams competing.

These matches were played on 6 September 2020.

Second round results: Corsica
Tie no	Home team (tier)	Score	Away team (tier)
1.	AS Cargesienne (8)	3–0 (Note: Tie won by means of forfeit.)	US Vicolaise FC (8)
2.	Entente Gallia Salines (8)	1–3	FC Eccica-Suarella (7)
3.	SC Bastio (9)	2–0	AS Antisanti (8)

=== Third round ===
These matches were played on 19 and 20 September 2020.

Third round results: Corsica
Tie no	Home team (tier)	Score	Away team (tier)
1.	ASC Pieve di Lota (7)	1–1 (4–2 p) (Note: Original match abandoned due to bad weather.)	FC Costa Verde (7)
2.	CA Propriano (7)	1–0	Afa FA (7)
3.	FC Balagne (6)	3–1	FC Bastelicaccia (6)
4.	US Ghisonaccia (6)	2–2 (3–1 p)	Sud FC (6)
5.	AS Porto-Vecchio (6)	1–3	AJ Biguglia (6)
6.	JS Bonifacio (6)	0–4	USC Corte (5)
7.	Oriente FC (7)	0–4	GC Lucciana (5)
8.	AS Capicorsu (7)	0–4	AS Furiani-Agliani (5)
9.	AS Casinca (6)	9–0	SC Bastio (9)
10.	AS Santa Reparata (7)	1–1 (4–5 p)	AS Cargesienne (8)
11.	SC Bocognano Gravona (6)	0–0 (3–2 p)	FC Eccica-Suarella (7)

=== Fourth round ===
These matches were played on 3 and 4 October 2020.

Fourth round results: Corsica
Tie no	Home team (tier)	Score	Away team (tier)
1.	CA Propriano (7)	0–5	AS Furiani-Agliani (5)
2.	SC Bocognano Gravona (6)	5–0	US Ghisonaccia (6)
3.	AS Casinca (6)	0–2	Gazélec Ajaccio (4)
4.	AJ Biguglia (6)	1–1 (4–5 p)	FC Balagne (6)
5.	AS Cargesienne (8)	0–2	USC Corte (5)
6.	ASC Pieve di Lota (7)	0–3	GC Lucciana (5)

=== Fifth round ===
These matches were played on 18 October 2020, with two postponed until 24 and 28 October 2020.

Fifth round results: Corsica
Tie no	Home team (tier)	Score	Away team (tier)
1.	AS Furiani-Agliani (5)	2–2 (6–5 p)	SC Bastia (3)
2.	FC Balagne (6)	0–0 (4–2 p)	FC Bastia-Borgo (3)
3.	GC Lucciana (5)	4–1 (Note: Tie reversed from original draw.)	SC Bocognano Gravona (6)
4.	USC Corte (5)	0–5	Gazélec Ajaccio (4)

=== Sixth round ===
These matches were played on 31 January 2021.

Sixth round results: Corsica
Tie no	Home team (tier)	Score	Away team (tier)
1.	FC Balagne (6)	0–3	AS Furiani-Agliani (5)
2.	GC Lucciana (5)	0–3	Gazélec Ajaccio (4)
