= 2021–22 Coupe de France preliminary rounds, Corsica =

French football competition

The 2021–22 Coupe de France preliminary rounds, Corsica was the qualifying competition to decide which teams from the leagues of the Corsica region of France took part in the main competition from the seventh round.

Two teams qualified from the Corsica preliminary rounds. In 2020–21, Gazélec Ajaccio progressed furthest in the main competition, reaching the round of 32 before losing to Lille.

== Draws and fixtures ==
On 28 July 2021, the league announced that a total of 33 teams from the region had entered. A preliminary round, analogous to the second round in other regions, featured four clubs, with the winners going through to the third round, where they were joined by all other clubs from Championnat National 3 and below. The single Championnat National club joined the competition at the fifth round stage. The third round draw was published on 26 August 2021. The fourth round draw was published on 23 September 2021. The fifth round draw was published on 7 October 2021. The sixth round draw was made on 21 October 2021.

=== Second round ===
These matches were played on 12 September 2021.

Second round results: Corsica
Tie no	Home team (tier)	Score	Away team (tier)
1.	Stade Bastiais (9)	6–4	FC Costa Verde (7)
2.	US Vezzanaise (9)	3–0 (Note: Tie won by means of forfeit.)	Orsu Omessincu FC (9)

=== Third round ===
These matches were played on 18 and 19 September 2021.

Third round results: Corsica
Tie no	Home team (tier)	Score	Away team (tier)
1.	US Vezzanaise (9)	0–5	USC Corte (5)
2.	US Vicolaise FC (8)	4–1	AS Nebbiu Conca d'Oru (6)
3.	GC Lucciana (5)	3–0	SC Bocognano Gravona (6)
4.	Entente Gallia Salines (8)	2–2 (6–5 p)	FC Bastelicaccia (6)
5.	US Ghisonaccia (6)	1–2	Squadra Valincu Alta-Rocca Rizzanese (7)
6.	AS Santa Reparata (7)	4–0	AS Antisanti (8)
7.	Afa FA (7)	1–1 (8–7 p)	FJÉ Biguglia (6)
8.	Stade Bastiais (9)	0–0 (4–3 p)	FC Costa Verde (7)
9.	AS Cargesienne (8)	7–0	AJ Solenzara (9)
10.	AS Capicorsu (7)	0–5	AS Furiani-Agliani (5)
11.	FC Balagne (6)	7–0	FC Eccica-Suarella (7)
12.	Gazélec Ajaccio (5)	13–0 (Note: Tie reversed from original draw.)	FC U Niolu (9)
13.	AS Porto-Vecchio (6)	1–2	AS Casinca (6)
14.	JS Monticello (9)	3–4	Sud FC (6)

=== Fourth round ===
These matches were played on 2 and 3 October 2021.

Fourth round results: Corsica
Tie no	Home team (tier)	Score	Away team (tier)
1.	AS Cargesienne (8)	0–2	FC Balagne (6)
2.	Entente Gallia Salines (8)	0–13	Gazélec Ajaccio (5)
3.	AS Casinca (6)	3–4	GC Lucciana (5)
4.	AS Santa Reparata (7)	0–7	AS Furiani-Agliani (5)
5.	US Vicolaise FC (8)	3–0 (Note: Tie won by means of forfeit.)	Sud FC (6)
6.	Squadra Valincu Alta-Rocca Rizzanese (7)	0–2	USC Corte (5)
7.	Stade Bastiais (9)	0–3	Afa FA (7)

=== Fifth round ===
These matches were played on 16 and 17 October 2021.

Fifth round results: Corsica
Tie no	Home team (tier)	Score	Away team (tier)
1.	USC Corte (5)	2–1	GC Lucciana (5)
2.	AS Furiani-Agliani (5)	1–2	Gazélec Ajaccio (5)
3.	US Vicolaise FC (8)	0–12	FC Bastia-Borgo (3)
4.	Afa FA (7)	2–2 (4–5 p)	FC Balagne (6)

=== Sixth round ===
These matches were played on 30 and 31 October 2021.

Sixth round results: Corsica
Tie no	Home team (tier)	Score	Away team (tier)
1.	FC Balagne (6)	0–0 (2–4 p)	FC Bastia-Borgo (3)
2.	Gazélec Ajaccio (5)	3–0 (Note: Tie reversed from original draw.)	USC Corte (5)
