= 2023–24 Coupe de France preliminary rounds, Corsica =

French football competition

The 2023–24 Coupe de France preliminary rounds, Corsica is the qualifying competition to decide which teams from the leagues of the Corsica region of France take part in the main competition from the seventh round.

Two teams will qualify from the Corsica section of the 2023–24 Coupe de France preliminary rounds.

In 2022–23, both qualifying teams, FC Borgo and GC Lucciana were eliminated at the seventh-round stage. FC Borgo lost 3–0 at Nîmes. GC Lucciana lost by a single goal to JA Drancy from the same division.

== Draws and fixtures ==
On 16 August 2023, the league announced that a total of 35 teams from the region had entered the competition. At the same time, the structure of the qualifying competition was announced. A preliminary round, analogous to the second round in other regions, featured six teams, drawn from the 28 teams entered from the regional divisions. The winners, and those not drawn, progressed to the third round, where they were joined by the clubs from Championnat National 3. The third round draw was published on 7 September 2023. The fourth round draw, which saw the two Championnat National 2 teams enter the competition, was published on 21 September 2023. The fifth round draw was published on 5 October 2023. The sixth and final regional round was drawn on 19 October 2023.

=== Second round ===
These matches were played on 3 September 2023.

Second Round Results: Corsica
Tie no	Home team (Tier)	Score	Away team (Tier)
1.	AS Santa Reparata (8)	7–0	Ghjuventù Bastiaccia (9)
2.	AS Bastiaise (9)	0–4	EC Bastiais (8)
3.	AS Cargesienne (8)	3–0 (Note: Tie won by means of forfeit.)	AS Calinzana (9)

=== Third round ===
These matches were played on 17 September 2023.

Third Round Results: Corsica
Tie no	Home team (Tier)	Score	Away team (Tier)
1.	ASC Pieve di Lota (7)	2–0	AS Antisanti (7)
2.	AS Casinca (6)	1–0	Gazélec Ajaccio (7)
3.	Afa FA (6)	7–0	AS Santa Reparata (7)
4.	FC Eccica-Suarella (7)	4–1	US Vicolaise FC (8)
5.	EC Bastiais (8)	1–2	SC Bocognano Gravona (6)
6.	Squadra Lumiaccia (9)	2–6	Squadra Valincu Alta-Rocca Rizzanese (6)
7.	JS Monticello (7)	0–2	Sud FC (6)
8.	GC Lucciana (5)	2–0	FC Costa Verde (6)
9.	AS Capicorsu (8)	4–1	Football Club Ponte-Leccia Morosaglia (9)
10.	FC Lupinu (8)	1–1 (3–4 p)	AS Cargesienne (8)
11.	FC Bastelicaccia (6)	1–2	USC Corte (5)
12.	AS Nebbiu Conca d'Oru (6)	1–5	FC Balagne (5)
13.	FJÉ Biguglia (6)	3–0	AS Porto-Vecchio (7)
14.	Oriente FC (8)	1–4	US Ghisonaccia (6)

=== Fourth round ===
These matches were played on 30 September and 1 October 2023.

Fourth Round Results: Corsica
Tie no	Home team (Tier)	Score	Away team (Tier)
1.	ASC Pieve di Lota (7)	0–7	AS Furiani-Agliani (4)
2.	Squadra Valincu Alta-Rocca Rizzanese (6)	4–3	GC Lucciana (5)
3.	AS Cargesienne (8)	6–0	AS Capicorsu (8)
4.	FC Eccica-Suarella (7)	0–3	FC Borgo (4)
5.	Sud FC (6)	1–0	FJÉ Biguglia (6)
6.	US Ghisonaccia (6)	0–2	FC Balagne (5)
7.	USC Corte (5)	3–0 (Note: Tie reversed from original draw.)	Afa FA (6)
8.	SC Bocognano Gravona (6)	5–0	AS Casinca (6)

=== Fifth round ===
These matches were played on 14 and 15 October 2023.

Fifth Round Results: Corsica
Tie no	Home team (Tier)	Score	Away team (Tier)
1.	FC Borgo (4)	5–2	USC Corte (5)
2.	FC Balagne (5)	1–0	Sud FC (6)
3.	AS Cargesienne (8)	0–3	Squadra Valincu Alta-Rocca Rizzanese (6)
4.	SC Bocognano Gravona (6)	0–2	AS Furiani-Agliani (4)

=== Sixth round ===
These matches were played on 28 and 29 October 2023.

Sixth Round Results: Corsica
Tie no	Home team (Tier)	Score	Away team (Tier)
1.	Squadra Valincu Alta-Rocca Rizzanese (6)	2–1	FC Balagne (5)
2.	AS Furiani-Agliani (4)	2–1	FC Borgo (4)
