= 2024–25 Coupe de France preliminary rounds, Corsica =

The 2024–25 Coupe de France preliminary rounds, Corsica was the qualifying competition to decide which teams from the leagues of the Corsica region of France took part in the main competition from the seventh round.

Two teams qualified from the Corsica preliminary rounds.

In 2023–24, AS Furiani-Agliani were the team from the region that progressed furthest in the main competition, losing in the eighth round to Entente SSG from Championnat National 3, one division below, by a single goal.

== Draws and fixtures ==
On 1 August 2024, the league announced that there were 38 teams entered into the competition, and laid out the format of the preliminary rounds. 12 teams from Regional 3 and Regional 4 entered from the start of the competition, aligned with the second round of the other regions. The 18 other Regional teams, and the 4 teams from Championnat National 3 entered at the third round stage. The two Championnat National 2 teams entered at the fourth round stage. By the time the draw for the second round was made on 8 August 2024, this had changed to just five ties being drawn and 19 byes, due to one team withdrawing from the competition.

The third round draw was published on 5 September 2024. The fourth round draw was published on 19 September 2024. The fifth round draw was published on 3 October 2024. The sixth round draw was published on 17 October 2024.

=== Second round ===
These matches were played on 1 September 2024.

Second Round Results: Corsica
Tie no	Home team (Tier)	Score	Away team (Tier)
1.	Ghjuventù Bastiaccia (9)	3–0 (Note: Tie won by means of forfeit.)	FC Sotta (9)
2.	FC Lupinu (8)	1–0	EC Bastiais (8)
3.	FC Ponte-Leccia Morosaglia (9)	2–3	AS Capicorsu (8)
4.	Toga FC Bastia (9)	1–9	AS Calinzana (8)
5.	Squadra Lumiaccia (8)	0–0 (4–5 p)	Saint-Jean Ajaccio FC (9)

=== Third round ===
These matches were played on 15 September 2024.

Third Round Results: Corsica
Tie no	Home team (Tier)	Score	Away team (Tier)
1.	ASC Pieve di Lota (7)	2–2 (3–5 p)	SC Bocognano Gravona (6)
2.	Oriente FC (8)	1–5	Gazélec Ajaccio (6)
3.	JS Bonifacio (7)	1–1 (3–1 p)	FC Bastelicaccia (6)
4.	AS Ghisonaccia-Prunelli (6)	3–0 (Note: Tie won by means of forfeit.)	AS Cargesienne (7)
5.	AS Santa Reparata (7)	0–4	Sud FC (5)
6.	AS Capicorsu (8)	1–7	GC Lucciana (5)
7.	FJÉ Biguglia (6)	1–3	FC Borgo (5)
8.	Saint-Jean Ajaccio FC (9)	1–2	FC Eccica-Suarella (6)
9.	FC Lupinu (8)	0–2	Squadra Valincu Alta-Rocca Rizzanese (6)
10.	FC Costa Verde (7)	6–1	AS Calinzana (8)
11.	Afa FA (6)	2–0	AS Porto-Vecchio (6)
12.	Gazélec FC Bastia-Lucciana (7)	0–5	AS Casinca (6)
13.	AS Nebbiu Conca d'Oru (7)	0–2	USC Corte (5)
14.	Ghjuventù Bastiaccia (9)	1–5	AS Antisanti (8)

=== Fourth round ===
These matches were played on 27, 28 and 29 September 2024.

Fourth Round Results: Corsica
Tie no	Home team (Tier)	Score	Away team (Tier)
1.	GC Lucciana (5)	2–0	SC Bocognano Gravona (6)
2.	USC Corte (5)	4–0	Squadra Valincu Alta-Rocca Rizzanese (6)
3.	Afa FA (6)	2–2 (4–3 p)	AS Furiani-Agliani (4)
4.	Sud FC (5)	2–0	FC Borgo (5)
5.	JS Bonifacio (7)	0–0 (3–1 p)	FC Costa Verde (7)
6.	AS Antisanti (8)	1–3	AS Casinca (6)
7.	Gazélec Ajaccio (6)	2–1	AS Ghisonaccia-Prunelli (6)
8.	FC Eccica-Suarella (6)	0–4	FC Balagne (5)

=== Fifth round ===
These matches were played on 12 and 13 October 2024.

Fifth Round Results: Corsica
Tie no	Home team (Tier)	Score	Away team (Tier)
1.	FC Balagne (5)	0–0 (3–4 p)	USC Corte (5)
2.	Sud FC (5)	1–1 (4–3 p)	Gazélec Ajaccio (6)
3.	AS Casinca (6)	2–1	JS Bonifacio (7)
4.	GC Lucciana (5)	4–2	Afa FA (6)

=== Sixth round ===
These matches were played on 27 October 2024.

Sixth Round Results: Corsica
Tie no	Home team (Tier)	Score	Away team (Tier)
1.	GC Lucciana (5)	3–0	AS Casinca (6)
2.	USC Corte (5)	3–1	Sud FC (5)
