= 2019–20 Championnat National 3 =

Championnat National 3
- Season: 2019–20
- Dates: 17 August 2019 – 12 March 2020
- Promoted: 13 teams (see Season outcomes section)
- Relegated: 36 teams (see Season outcomes section)
- Top goalscorer: 16 goals Omar Wade, Gueugnon; Johanne Akassou, Versailles
- Biggest home win: Hauts Lyonnais 9–1 Saint-Flour; Group M, Round 16, 15 February 2020
- Biggest away win: Sarreguemines 0–9 Thaon; Group F, Round 10, 9 November 2019
- Highest scoring: 10 goals Hauts Lyonnais 9–1 Saint-Flour; Group M, Round 16, 15 February 2020

The 2019–20 Championnat National 3 was the third season of the fifth tier in the French football league system in its current format. The competition was contested by 168 clubs split geographically across 12 groups of 14 teams. The teams included amateur clubs (although a few were semi-professional) and the reserve teams of professional clubs. The season was suspended indefinitely on 12 March 2020 due to the COVID-19 pandemic in France.

On 16 April 2020, the FFF announced the termination of the competition, with promotion and relegation decided by points earned per game played, subject to the normal verification process by the financial authority, the DNCG.

== Teams ==
On 17 July, the French Football Federation ratified the constitution of the competition, and published the groups as follows:

- 116 teams that were not relegated or promoted from the 2018–19 Championnat National 3 groups.
- 10 teams relegated from 2018–19 Championnat National 2 after any reprieves and additional administrative relegations to the Regional Leagues (Pontarlier, Nice (res), Bordeaux (res), Mont-de-Marsan, Furiani-Agliani, Boulogne-Billancourt, Le Havre (res), Feignies Aulnoye, Arras and Athlético Marseille).
- 5 teams reprieved from relegation from 2018–19 Championnat National 3 groups.
- Tours, who take the place of their reserve team after administrative relegation.
- Paris Saint-Germain (res), who took a voluntary relegation from 2018–19 Championnat National 2.
- 36 teams promoted from Regional Division d'Honneur (as shown in the table below).

Teams promoted to Championnat National 3
| Region | Team | Method of qualification |
|---|---|---|
| Nouvelle-Aquitaine | Châtellerault | Champion, R1 Group A |
| Nouvelle-Aquitaine | Cognac | Champion, R1 Group B |
| Nouvelle-Aquitaine | Bassin d'Arcachon | Champion, R1 Group C |
| Pays de la Loire | Pouzauges | Champion, R1 Group A |
| Pays de la Loire | Changé | Champion, R1 Group B |
| Pays de la Loire | La Châtaigneraie | Playoff winner |
| Centre-Val de Loire | Saint-Cyr-sur-Loire | Champion, R1 |
| Centre-Val de Loire | Dreux | Runner-up, R1 |
| Centre-Val de Loire | Saran | 3rd place, R1 |
| Méditerranée-Corsica | Balagne | Champion, R1 Corsica (Note: Balagne were originally promoted, but lost the place after an administrative court decision over-ruled an earlier appeal board decision of the league of Corsica, awarding the place to USC Corte. FC Balagne appealed this decision and were re-awarded the place on 14 August.) |
| Méditerranée-Corsica | EUGA Ardziv | 4th place, R1 Méditerranée (Note: Champions, Marignane Gignac (res) ineligible for promotion due to relegation of the first team from 2018–19 Championnat National. Second place Rapid de Menton and third place US Carnoux denied promotion by the regional DNCG.) |
| Méditerranée-Corsica | Mandelieu | 5th place, R1 Méditerranée |
| Bourgogne-Franche-Comté | Sens | Champion, R1 Pool A |
| Bourgogne-Franche-Comté | Valdahon-Vercel | Champion, R1 Pool B |
| Bourgogne-Franche-Comté | Roche-Novillars | Runner-up, R1 Pool B |
| Grand Est | Prix-lès-Mézières | Champion, R1 Champagne-Ardenne |
| Grand Est | Metz (res) | Champion, R1 Lorraine |
| Grand Est | Illkirch-Graffenstaden | Champion, R1 Alsace |
| Occitanie | Auch | Champion, R1 Group A |
| Occitanie | Béziers (res) | Champion, R1 Group B |
| Occitanie | Aigues-Mortes | Champion, R1 Group C |
| Hauts-de-France | Vimy | Champion, R1 Group A |
| Hauts-de-France | Le Portel | Champion, R1 Group B |
| Hauts-de-France | Valenciennes (res) | Best runner-up |
| Normandy | AG Caen | Champion, R1 Pool A |
| Normandy | Grand-Quevilly | Champion, R1 Pool B |
| Normandy | Vire | Runner-up, R1 Pool A |
| Brittany | Trégunc | Champion, R1 Pool A |
| Brittany | Guichen | Runner-up, R1 Pool B (Note: Champion of R1 Pool B, Stade Briochin (res) were ineligible for promotion under the rules of the competition) |
| Brittany | Ergué-Gabéric | Runner-up, R1 Pool A |
| Paris Île-de-France | Saint-Leu | Runner-up, R1 Group A (Note: Champion of R1 Pool B, PSG (third team) were ineligible for promotion under the rules of the competition) |
| Paris Île-de-France | Noisy-le-Grand | Champion, R1 Group B |
| Paris Île-de-France | Torcy | Runner-up, R1 Group B |
| Auvergne-Rhône-Alpes | Le Puy (res) | Champion, R1 Ouest |
| Auvergne-Rhône-Alpes | Hauts Lyonnais | Champion, R1 Est |
| Auvergne-Rhône-Alpes | Saint-Flour | Runner-up, R1 Ouest |

== Promotion and relegation ==
If eligible, the top team in each group is promoted to Championnat National 2. If a team finishing top of the group is ineligible, or declines promotion, the next eligible team in that group is promoted.

Generally, three teams are relegated from each group to their respective top regional league, subject to reprieves. Extra teams are relegated from a group if more than one team is relegated to that group from Championnat National 2. In the case that no teams are relegated to a group from Championnat National 2, one less team is relegated from that group to the regional league.

Reserve teams whose training centre are categorised as category 2B or lower cannot be promoted to Championnat National 2 by the rules of the competition. It was announced in November 2019 that the following reserve teams would be ineligible for promotion following the categorisation of their training centres: AC Ajaccio, Clermont, Dijon, Niort, Orléans and Paris FC.

== Special rule changes ==
Due to the premature cancellation of the season before completion, special rules were put in place by the FFF to rank clubs, superseding the normal competition rules.

1. Points per game completed
2. Number of points gained in head-to-head matches (only where all scheduled matches between all tied teams have completed)
3. Goal difference in head-to-head matches (only where all scheduled matches between all tied teams have completed)
4. Number of away games completed, as a percentage of overall number of games completed
5. Goal difference per game completed
6. Goals scored per game completed
7. Fair play
8. Better classification, based on completion of the first set of round robin games (only if all clubs have completed at least one game against all other clubs)
9. Drawing of lots

Regional governing bodies of each league (and the FFF itself for Group D) apply these criteria and publish final league tables.

== League tables ==
=== Group A: Nouvelle-Aquitaine ===
| Pos | Team | Pld | W | D | L | GF | GA | GD | PPG | Promotion or relegation |
|---|---|---|---|---|---|---|---|---|---|---|
| 1 | Mont-de-Marsan (P) | 18 | 9 | 5 | 4 | 36 | 30 | +6 | 1.78 | Promotion to National 2 |
| 2 | Bressuire | 17 | 7 | 7 | 3 | 27 | 15 | +12 | 1.65 (Note: Bressuire and Chauvigny did not complete both games. Both completed 8 away games. Criteria 5 (goal difference per game) applies. Bressuire 0.71 Chauvigny 0.47) | |
| 3 | Chauvigny | 17 | 7 | 7 | 3 | 31 | 23 | +8 | 1.65 | |
| 4 | Lège Cap Ferret | 18 | 7 | 7 | 4 | 29 | 20 | +9 | 1.56 | |
| 5 | Bayonne (Note: Bayonne were penalised for fielding a player not named on the teamsheet in the game at Poitiers on 8 February 2020. The original scoreline was 1–1. Poitiers were awarded a 3–0 victory and Bayonne were deducted a penalty point.) | 17 | 7 | 6 | 4 | 22 | 17 | +5 | 1.53 | |
| 6 | Poitiers | 18 | 6 | 9 | 3 | 31 | 20 | +11 | 1.50 | |
| 7 | Cognac | 17 | 5 | 7 | 5 | 20 | 27 | −7 | 1.29 | |
| 8 | Bordeaux (res) | 18 | 5 | 8 | 5 | 23 | 24 | −1 | 1.28 | |
| 9 | Anglet | 17 | 5 | 6 | 6 | 22 | 26 | −4 | 1.24 | |
| 10 | Niort (res) | 17 | 4 | 7 | 6 | 21 | 24 | −3 | 1.12 | |
| 11 | Châtellerault | 18 | 6 | 2 | 10 | 24 | 30 | −6 | 1.11 | |
| 12 | Pau (res) (R) | 17 | 4 | 6 | 7 | 20 | 25 | −5 | 1.06 | Relegation to Regional 1 |
| 13 | Mérignac Arlac (R) | 18 | 3 | 8 | 7 | 19 | 25 | −6 | 0.94 | Relegation to Regional 1 |
| 14 | Bassin d'Arcachon (R) | 17 | 2 | 5 | 10 | 20 | 39 | −19 | 0.65 | Relegation to Regional 1 |

Source: Ligue de Football Nouvelle Aquitaine
Rules for classification: see Special rule changes section
(P) Promoted; (R) Relegated

=== Group B: Pays de la Loire ===
| Pos | Team | Pld | W | D | L | GF | GA | GD | PPG | Promotion or relegation |
|---|---|---|---|---|---|---|---|---|---|---|
| 1 | Châteaubriant (P) | 17 | 13 | 2 | 2 | 32 | 8 | +24 | 2.41 | Promotion to National 2 |
| 2 | La Roche | 18 | 13 | 3 | 2 | 46 | 11 | +35 | 2.33 | |
| 3 | Saumur | 18 | 9 | 4 | 5 | 30 | 25 | +5 | 1.72 | |
| 4 | Challans | 18 | 9 | 3 | 6 | 26 | 20 | +6 | 1.67 | |
| 5 | Pouzauges (Note: The match between Pouzauges and Vertou on 2 November 2019 was ordered to be replayed after Vertou lodged a complaint over the floodlights at Pouzauges' alternate ground. The original scoreline was 3–1. The original result still appears on the table.) | 17 | 7 | 6 | 4 | 25 | 26 | −1 | 1.59 | |
| 6 | Sablé | 18 | 8 | 4 | 6 | 34 | 30 | +4 | 1.56 | |
| 7 | Laval (res) | 18 | 7 | 3 | 8 | 34 | 29 | +5 | 1.33 | |
| 8 | La Châtaigneraie | 17 | 6 | 4 | 7 | 21 | 26 | −5 | 1.29 | |
| 9 | Vertou | 18 | 6 | 5 | 7 | 31 | 27 | +4 | 1.28 | |
| 10 | Fontenay | 17 | 5 | 5 | 7 | 26 | 33 | −7 | 1.18 | |
| 11 | Le Mans (res) | 18 | 4 | 4 | 10 | 19 | 37 | −18 | 0.89 | |
| 12 | Changé | 17 | 2 | 6 | 9 | 22 | 41 | −19 | 0.71 | |
| 13 | Les Herbiers (res) (R) | 18 | 2 | 6 | 10 | 17 | 28 | −11 | 0.67 | Relegation to Regional 1 |
| 14 | La Flèche (R) | 17 | 2 | 5 | 10 | 9 | 31 | −22 | 0.65 | Relegation to Regional 1 |

Source: Ligue de Football des Pays de la Loire
Rules for classification: see Special rule changes section
(P) Promoted; (R) Relegated

=== Group C: Centre-Val de Loire ===
| Pos | Team | Pld | W | D | L | GF | GA | GD | PPG | Promotion or relegation |
|---|---|---|---|---|---|---|---|---|---|---|
| 1 | Tours (Note: On 15 June 2020 the DNCG committee of the FFF ruled that Tours were to be denied promotion. With this decision, Bourges 18 would be promoted, subject to ratification, and any potential appeal from Tours. The decision was confirmed at the appeal on 10 July 2020.) (D) | 18 | 12 | 5 | 1 | 46 | 22 | +24 | 2.28 | |
| 2 | Bourges 18 (P) | 17 | 8 | 6 | 3 | 32 | 21 | +11 | 1.76 | Promotion to National 2 |
| 3 | Avoine Chinon | 17 | 8 | 4 | 5 | 30 | 21 | +9 | 1.65 | |
| 4 | Orléans (res) | 18 | 9 | 2 | 7 | 39 | 33 | +6 | 1.61 | |
| 5 | Chartres (res) | 18 | 7 | 7 | 4 | 32 | 31 | +1 | 1.56 | |
| 6 | Saran | 17 | 7 | 4 | 6 | 24 | 20 | +4 | 1.47 | |
| 7 | Ouest Tourangeau | 18 | 6 | 8 | 4 | 29 | 20 | +9 | 1.44 (Note: Ouest Tourangeau, Montlouis-sur-Loire and Vierzon did not complete all matches against each other. All played 9 away matches. Rule 5 (Goal difference per game completed) applies. Ouest Tourangeau 0.50, Montlouis-sur-Loire 0.39, Vierzon 0.17) | |
| 8 | Montlouis-sur-Loire (Note: On 12 December the Ligue Centre-Val de Loire de Football announced that Montlouis-sur-Loire were to be penalised three points due to a breach of the rules for participation in the division, in respect of fielding a team in an organised under-19 or under 18 competition.) | 18 | 7 | 8 | 3 | 29 | 22 | +7 | 1.44 | |
| 9 | Vierzon | 18 | 7 | 5 | 6 | 29 | 26 | +3 | 1.44 | |
| 10 | Montargis (Note: Montargis were penalised for fielding a suspended player in the round 9 match against Tours on 30 November 2019. The original result was 2–1. Tours were awarded a 3–0 victory, and Montargis were deducted a penalty point.) | 17 | 4 | 8 | 5 | 20 | 20 | 0 | 1.12 | |
| 11 | Châteauroux (res) | 17 | 5 | 2 | 10 | 27 | 37 | −10 | 1.00 | |
| 12 | Châteauneuf-sur-Loire | 17 | 3 | 3 | 11 | 18 | 40 | −22 | 0.71 | |
| 13 | Saint-Cyr-sur-Loire (Note: Saint-Cyr-sur-Loire were penalised for fielding a suspended player in the round 6 match at Montlouis-sur-Loire on 5 October 2019. The original result was 2–2. Montlouis-sur-Loire were awarded a 3–0 victory, and Saint-Cyr-sur-Loire were deducted a penalty point.) (R) | 18 | 3 | 3 | 12 | 16 | 41 | −25 | 0.61 | Relegation to Regional 1 |
| 14 | Dreux (Note: Dreux were penalised for fielding a suspended player in the round 1 match at Saran on 17 August 2019. The original result was 0–0. Saran were awarded a 3–0 victory, and Dreux were deducted a penalty point.) (R) | 16 | 2 | 3 | 11 | 20 | 37 | −17 | 0.50 | Relegation to Regional 1 |

Source: Ligue Centre-Val de Loire de Football
Rules for classification: see Special rule changes section
(D) Denied promotion, see notes; (P) Promoted; (R) Relegated

=== Group D: Provence-Alpes-Côte d'Azur-Corsica ===
| Pos | Team | Pld | W | D | L | GF | GA | GD | PPG | Promotion or relegation |
|---|---|---|---|---|---|---|---|---|---|---|
| 1 | Athlético Marseille (Note: On 9 June 2020, the Commission Régionale de Contrôle des Clubs of the Ligue de Méditerranée announced that Athlético Marseille would be administratively relegated to Régional 2 for financial irregularities. Aubagne would instead be promoted to National 2 and Gémenos were reprieved from relegation. On 8 July the appeal committee of the DNCG overturned the ruling, and represented the clubs case for approval of promotion to N2. On 15 July, the CRCC once again denied the club promotion. The club appealed again, and on 27 July 2020 the appeal committee of the DNCG confirmed the promotion. Three days later, the disciplinary committee of the FFF announced that they were demoting the club back to National 3, due to the production of fraudulent documentation at the end of the 2018–19 season. To make matters worse, they dissolved in 2022, meaning they missed their final ever chance to get promoted.) (D) | 18 | 12 | 1 | 5 | 38 | 23 | +15 | 2.06 | |
| 2 | Aubagne (P) | 18 | 10 | 5 | 3 | 28 | 14 | +14 | 1.94 | Promotion to National 2 |
| 3 | Lucciana | 18 | 9 | 4 | 5 | 38 | 29 | +9 | 1.72 | |
| 4 | Istres | 18 | 9 | 2 | 7 | 29 | 29 | 0 | 1.61 | |
| 5 | AC Ajaccio (res) | 18 | 7 | 7 | 4 | 26 | 21 | +5 | 1.56 | |
| 6 | Saint-Jean Beaulieu | 18 | 8 | 2 | 8 | 26 | 22 | +4 | 1.44 (Note: Saint-Jean Beaulieu and Côte Bleue did not complete both their games. Criteria 4 (Number of away games completed, as a percentage of overall number of games completed) applies: Saint-Jean Beaulieu 50%, Côte Bleue 44%.) | |
| 7 | Côte Bleue | 18 | 6 | 8 | 4 | 26 | 23 | +3 | 1.44 | |
| 8 | Mandelieu | 18 | 7 | 4 | 7 | 21 | 25 | −4 | 1.39 | |
| 9 | Furiani-Agliani | 18 | 6 | 6 | 6 | 17 | 19 | −2 | 1.33 | |
| 10 | Cannes (Note: Cannes were penalised for fielding a player who wasn't on the teamsheet in the game against AC Ajaccio (res) on 5 October 2019. The original scoreline was 0–0. AC Ajaccio (res) were awarded a 3–0 win and Cannes were deducted a penalty point.) | 18 | 6 | 6 | 6 | 18 | 13 | +5 | 1.28 (Note: Cannes and Nice (res) completed both their games (Nice (res) 1–0 Cannes, Cannes 2–1 Nice (res)). Tied under Criteria 2 and 3. Both played 9 away games out of 18 total. Criteria 5 (Goal difference per game completed) applies: Cannes 0.28, Nice (res) 0.17.) | |
| 11 | Nice (res) (Note: Nice (res) were penalised for fielding a suspended player in the game against Balagne on 8 February 2020. The original scoreline was 3–2. Balagne were awarded a 3–0 win and Nice (res) were deducted a penalty point.) | 18 | 7 | 3 | 8 | 23 | 20 | +3 | 1.28 | |
| 12 | Gémenos (R) | 18 | 4 | 2 | 12 | 17 | 34 | −17 | 0.78 (Note: Gémenos and EUGA Ardziv did not complete both their games. Criteria 4 (Number of away games completed, as a percentage of overall number of games completed): Gémenos 50%, EUGA Ardziv 44.4%) | Relegation to Regional 1 |
| 13 | EUGA Ardziv (R) | 18 | 3 | 5 | 10 | 18 | 39 | −21 | 0.78 | Relegation to Regional 1 |
| 14 | Balagne (R) | 18 | 3 | 3 | 12 | 20 | 34 | −14 | 0.67 | Relegation to Regional 1 |

Source: fff.fr
Rules for classification: see Special rule changes section
(D) Denied promotion, see notes; (P) Promoted, see notes; (R) Relegated

=== Group E: Bourgogne-Franche-Comté ===
| Pos | Team | Pld | W | D | L | GF | GA | GD | PPG | Promotion or relegation |
|---|---|---|---|---|---|---|---|---|---|---|
| 1 | Auxerre (res) (P) | 17 | 14 | 3 | 0 | 37 | 12 | +25 | 2.65 | Promotion to National 2 |
| 2 | Gueugnon | 18 | 12 | 2 | 4 | 37 | 20 | +17 | 2.11 | |
| 3 | Besançon Football | 18 | 12 | 1 | 5 | 33 | 13 | +20 | 2.06 | |
| 4 | Dijon (res) | 18 | 9 | 5 | 4 | 27 | 16 | +11 | 1.78 | |
| 5 | Racing Besançon | 16 | 8 | 3 | 5 | 34 | 24 | +10 | 1.69 | |
| 6 | Pontarlier | 15 | 7 | 1 | 7 | 24 | 23 | +1 | 1.47 | |
| 7 | Sochaux (res) | 17 | 6 | 6 | 5 | 27 | 23 | +4 | 1.41 | |
| 8 | Morteau-Montlebon | 16 | 5 | 3 | 8 | 19 | 21 | −2 | 1.13 | |
| 9 | Jura Dolois | 17 | 5 | 4 | 8 | 17 | 25 | −8 | 1.12 | |
| 10 | Montceau (Note: On 11 December 2019, the Ligue de Football Bourgogne-Franche-Comté announced that Montceau would be deducted three points due to its financial position at the end of June 2019.) | 16 | 6 | 2 | 8 | 29 | 33 | −4 | 1.06 | |
| 11 | Is-Selongey (Note: On 23 January 2020, the Ligue de Football Bourgogne-Franche-Comté announced that Is-Selongey would be deducted three points due to failing to meet its obligations regarding participation in the league, namely not entering an under-18 team for the duration of the season.) | 17 | 5 | 3 | 9 | 17 | 32 | −15 | 0.88 | |
| 12 | Valdahon-Vercel | 17 | 4 | 2 | 11 | 16 | 30 | −14 | 0.82 | |
| 13 | Sens (R) | 18 | 2 | 6 | 10 | 20 | 40 | −20 | 0.67 | Relegation to Regional 1 |
| 14 | Roche-Novillars (R) | 18 | 1 | 5 | 12 | 19 | 44 | −25 | 0.44 | Relegation to Regional 1 |

Source: Ligue de Football Bourgogne-Franche-Comté
Rules for classification: see Special rule changes section
(P) Promoted; (R) Relegated

=== Group F: Grand Est ===
| Pos | Team | Pld | W | D | L | GF | GA | GD | PPG | Promotion or relegation |
|---|---|---|---|---|---|---|---|---|---|---|
| 1 | Metz (res) (P) | 18 | 11 | 4 | 3 | 33 | 17 | +16 | 2.06 | Promotion to National 2 |
| 2 | Sarre-Union | 17 | 10 | 2 | 5 | 29 | 20 | +9 | 1.88 | |
| 3 | Thaon | 17 | 7 | 5 | 5 | 30 | 24 | +6 | 1.53 | |
| 4 | Prix-lès-Mézières | 18 | 7 | 6 | 5 | 20 | 19 | +1 | 1.50 | |
| 5 | ESTAC Troyes (res) | 18 | 7 | 4 | 7 | 32 | 26 | +6 | 1.39 | |
| 6 | Raon-l'Étape | 16 | 6 | 4 | 6 | 19 | 21 | −2 | 1.38 | |
| 7 | Biesheim | 18 | 7 | 3 | 8 | 28 | 26 | +2 | 1.33 (Note: Biesheim and RC Strasbourg (res) did not complete both their games. They both played the same number of games and the same number of away games. Criteria 5 (Goal difference per game completed) applies: Biesheim 0.11, RC Strasbourg (res) -0.11.) | |
| 8 | RC Strasbourg (res) | 18 | 6 | 6 | 6 | 21 | 23 | −2 | 1.33 | |
| 9 | Amnéville | 18 | 7 | 2 | 9 | 26 | 30 | −4 | 1.28 | |
| 10 | Illkirch-Graffenstaden | 17 | 5 | 6 | 6 | 23 | 22 | +1 | 1.24 | |
| 11 | St-Louis Neuweg | 18 | 5 | 6 | 7 | 17 | 22 | −5 | 1.17 | |
| 12 | ASPV Strasbourg (Note: On 4 February 2020 the Ligue du Grant Est de Football announced the deduction of three points from ASPV Strasbourg for failing to meet the requirements of the participation in the league, namely by not fielding a team in the Coupe Gambardella. ASPV Strasbourg were confirmed as relegated on 6 July 2020, due to the series of events that started with FC Mulhouse being relegated by the DNCG.) (R) | 16 | 5 | 6 | 5 | 25 | 27 | −2 | 1.13 | Relegation to Regional 1 |
| 13 | FCM Troyenne (R) | 17 | 5 | 3 | 9 | 18 | 22 | −4 | 1.06 | Relegation to Regional 1 |
| 14 | Sarreguemines (R) | 18 | 3 | 5 | 10 | 26 | 48 | −22 | 0.78 | Relegation to Regional 1 |

Source: Ligue du Grant Est de Football
Rules for classification: see Special rule changes section
(P) Promoted; (R) Relegated

=== Group H: Occitanie ===
| Pos | Team | Pld | W | D | L | GF | GA | GD | PPG | Promotion or relegation |
|---|---|---|---|---|---|---|---|---|---|---|
| 1 | Canet Roussillon (P) | 18 | 12 | 3 | 3 | 29 | 16 | +13 | 2.17 | Promotion to National 2 |
| 2 | Balma | 18 | 7 | 9 | 2 | 23 | 15 | +8 | 1.67 | |
| 3 | Agde | 18 | 6 | 10 | 2 | 29 | 23 | +6 | 1.56 | |
| 4 | Blagnac | 18 | 7 | 5 | 6 | 28 | 21 | +7 | 1.44 (Note: Blagnac and Muret did not complete both their games. Both played ten away games out of a total of 18. Criteria 5 (Goal difference per game completed) applies: Blagnac 0.39, Muret -0,06.) | |
| 5 | Muret | 18 | 6 | 8 | 4 | 15 | 16 | −1 | 1.44 | |
| 6 | Rodez (res) | 18 | 6 | 7 | 5 | 32 | 25 | +7 | 1.39 (Note: Rodez (res), Fabrègues and Stade Beaucairois did not complete all their head-to-head games. Criteria 4 (Number of away games completed, as a percentage of overall number of games completed) applies: Rodez (res) 55.6%, Fabrègues 50%, Stade Beaucairois 44.4%.) | |
| 7 | Fabrègues | 18 | 7 | 4 | 7 | 28 | 28 | 0 | 1.39 | |
| 8 | Stade Beaucairois | 18 | 6 | 7 | 5 | 26 | 26 | 0 | 1.39 | |
| 9 | Alès | 18 | 7 | 3 | 8 | 30 | 27 | +3 | 1.33 | |
| 10 | Toulouse (res) | 18 | 5 | 6 | 7 | 24 | 26 | −2 | 1.17 | |
| 11 | Aigues-Mortes (Note: Aigues-Mortes were penalised for fielding a suspended player in the against Stade Beaucairois on 12 January 2020. The original scoreline was 2–2. Stade Beaucairois were awarded a 0–3 victory, and Aigues-Mortes were deducted a penalty point.) (R) | 18 | 5 | 6 | 7 | 21 | 24 | −3 | 1.11 (Note: Aigues-Mortes and Béziers (res) completed both their games. (Aigues-Mortes 2–1 Béziers (res), Béziers (res) 0–2 Aigues-Mortes). Criteria 2 (Number of points gained in head-to-head matches (only where all scheduled matches between all tied teams have completed)) applies: Aigues-Mortes 6, Béziers (res) 0.) | Relegation to Regional 1 |
| 12 | Béziers (res) (R) | 18 | 5 | 5 | 8 | 25 | 37 | −12 | 1.11 | Relegation to Regional 1 |
| 13 | Auch (R) | 18 | 4 | 5 | 9 | 20 | 32 | −12 | 0.94 | Relegation to Regional 1 |
| 14 | Rodéo (R) | 18 | 3 | 2 | 13 | 16 | 30 | −14 | 0.61 | Relegation to Regional 1 |

Source: Ligue de Football d'Occitanie
Rules for classification: see Special rule changes section
(P) Promoted; (R) Relegated

=== Group I: Hauts-de-France ===
| Pos | Team | Pld | W | D | L | GF | GA | GD | PPG | Promotion or relegation |
|---|---|---|---|---|---|---|---|---|---|---|
| 1 | Beauvais (P) | 16 | 9 | 3 | 4 | 30 | 16 | +14 | 1.88 | Promotion to National 2 |
| 2 | Vimy | 15 | 7 | 4 | 4 | 17 | 16 | +1 | 1.67 | |
| 3 | Feignies Aulnoye | 17 | 7 | 7 | 3 | 20 | 10 | +10 | 1.65 | |
| 4 | Olympique Marcquois | 16 | 6 | 8 | 2 | 19 | 12 | +7 | 1.63 | |
| 5 | Maubeuge | 17 | 7 | 6 | 4 | 26 | 16 | +10 | 1.59 | |
| 6 | Le Touquet | 16 | 6 | 4 | 6 | 14 | 21 | −7 | 1.38 | |
| 7 | Valenciennes (res) | 17 | 7 | 2 | 8 | 21 | 21 | 0 | 1.35 | |
| 8 | AC Amiens (Note: The match between AC Amiens and Vimy on 21 September 2019 was abandoned in the final minutes after AC Amiens were reduced to seven players through sendings-off, therefore not having enough players remaining to continue the game. The scoreline was 1–1 at the time. Vimy were awarded a 3–0 win, and AC Amiens were deducted a penalty point.) | 16 | 5 | 7 | 4 | 23 | 22 | +1 | 1.31 | |
| 9 | Boulogne (res) | 16 | 5 | 4 | 7 | 18 | 26 | −8 | 1.19 (Note: Boulogne (res) and Amiens SC (res) did not complete both games. Criteria 4 (Number of away games completed) applies. Boulogne (res) 8, Amiens SC (res) 7.) | |
| 10 | Amiens SC (res) | 16 | 4 | 7 | 5 | 22 | 24 | −2 | 1.19 | |
| 11 | Le Portel (R) | 15 | 4 | 3 | 8 | 21 | 28 | −7 | 1.00 (Note: Le Portel and Grande-Synthe did not complete both games. Criteria 4 (Number of away games completed, as a percentage of overall number of games completed) applies. Le Portel 53%, Grande-Synthe 50%) | Relegation to Regional 1 |
| 12 | Grande-Synthe (R) | 16 | 3 | 7 | 6 | 19 | 22 | −3 | 1.00 | Relegation to Regional 1 |
| 13 | Arras (R) | 15 | 3 | 5 | 7 | 12 | 20 | −8 | 0.93 | Relegation to Regional 1 |
| 14 | Chambly (res) (R) | 16 | 3 | 5 | 8 | 13 | 21 | −8 | 0.88 | Relegation to Regional 1 |

Source: Ligue de Football des Hauts-de-France
Rules for classification: see Special rule changes section
(P) Promoted; (R) Relegated

=== Group J: Normandy ===
| Pos | Team | Pld | W | D | L | GF | GA | GD | PPG | Promotion or relegation |
|---|---|---|---|---|---|---|---|---|---|---|
| 1 | SM Caen (res) (P) | 18 | 12 | 3 | 3 | 31 | 20 | +11 | 2.17 | Promotion to National 2 |
| 2 | Évreux | 17 | 8 | 6 | 3 | 25 | 18 | +7 | 1.76 | |
| 3 | Le Havre (res) | 16 | 8 | 4 | 4 | 28 | 15 | +13 | 1.75 | |
| 4 | Saint-Lô | 17 | 8 | 5 | 4 | 37 | 26 | +11 | 1.71 | |
| 5 | AG Caen | 17 | 7 | 5 | 5 | 24 | 25 | −1 | 1.53 (Note: Vire and AG Caen completed both their matches (Vire 1–3 AG Caen, AG Caen 1–1 Vire). Criteria 2 (Number of points gained in head-to-head matches) applies: AG Caen 4, Vire 1.) | |
| 6 | Vire | 15 | 6 | 5 | 4 | 26 | 22 | +4 | 1.53 | |
| 7 | Cherbourg (Note: On 21 April 2020, the Ligue de Football de Normandie announced that, at a meeting held on 3 April 2020, Cherbourg were deducted 6 points for failing to comply with the financial requirements set out by the DNCG.) | 16 | 9 | 2 | 5 | 31 | 20 | +11 | 1.44 (Note: Cherbourg and Alençon did not complete both their matches. Criteria 4 (Number of away games completed, as a percentage of overall number of games completed) applies: Cherbourg 53.8%, Alençon 38.4%.) | |
| 8 | Alençon | 16 | 6 | 5 | 5 | 33 | 26 | +7 | 1.44 | |
| 9 | Dieppe | 16 | 6 | 3 | 7 | 23 | 26 | −3 | 1.31 | |
| 10 | Avranches (res) | 17 | 6 | 4 | 7 | 29 | 38 | −9 | 1.29 | |
| 11 | Quevilly-Rouen (res) | 17 | 5 | 2 | 10 | 23 | 36 | −13 | 1.00 | |
| 12 | Grand-Quevilly (R) | 18 | 4 | 3 | 11 | 28 | 37 | −9 | 0.83 | Relegation to Regional 1 |
| 13 | Pacy Ménilles (Note: Pacy Ménilles were penalised for fielding an ineligible player in the Round 1 game against Cherbourg. The original result was 2–0. Cherbourg were awarded a 3–0 and Pacy Ménilles were deducted a penalty point.) (R) | 17 | 3 | 4 | 10 | 22 | 41 | −19 | 0.71 | Relegation to Regional 1 |
| 14 | Gonfreville (R) | 15 | 2 | 1 | 12 | 19 | 29 | −10 | 0.47 | Relegation to Regional 1 |

Source: Ligue de Football de Normandie
Rules for classification: see Special rule changes section
(P) Promoted; (R) Relegated

=== Group K: Brittany ===
| Pos | Team | Pld | W | D | L | GF | GA | GD | PPG | Promotion or relegation |
|---|---|---|---|---|---|---|---|---|---|---|
| 1 | Plabennec (P) | 18 | 11 | 5 | 2 | 39 | 25 | +14 | 2.11 | Promotion to National 2 |
| 2 | Pontivy | 18 | 10 | 5 | 3 | 28 | 12 | +16 | 1.94 | |
| 3 | TA Rennes | 18 | 10 | 4 | 4 | 38 | 18 | +20 | 1.89 | |
| 4 | Dinan-Léhon | 18 | 9 | 6 | 3 | 39 | 18 | +21 | 1.83 | |
| 5 | Rennes (res) | 18 | 6 | 10 | 2 | 30 | 23 | +7 | 1.56 (Note: Rennes (res) and Saint-Colomban Locminé did not complete both games. Criteria 4 (number of away games completed) applies. Rennes (res) completed 10, Saint-Colomban Locminé completed 9.) | |
| 6 | Saint-Colomban Locminé | 18 | 6 | 10 | 2 | 24 | 14 | +10 | 1.56 | |
| 7 | Brest (res) | 18 | 7 | 4 | 7 | 33 | 33 | 0 | 1.39 | |
| 8 | Stade Pontivyen | 18 | 5 | 9 | 4 | 21 | 22 | −1 | 1.33 | |
| 9 | Plouzané | 18 | 5 | 4 | 9 | 20 | 33 | −13 | 1.06 | |
| 10 | Lannion | 18 | 3 | 9 | 6 | 19 | 23 | −4 | 1.00 | |
| 11 | Fougères | 18 | 3 | 8 | 7 | 23 | 34 | −11 | 0.94 | |
| 12 | Trégunc (R) | 18 | 2 | 7 | 9 | 16 | 34 | −18 | 0.72 | Relegation to Regional 1 |
| 13 | Ergué-Gabéric (R) | 18 | 3 | 3 | 12 | 20 | 41 | −21 | 0.67 | Relegation to Regional 1 |
| 14 | Guichen (R) | 18 | 1 | 6 | 11 | 10 | 30 | −20 | 0.50 | Relegation to Regional 1 |

Source: Ligue Bretagne de Football
Rules for classification: see Special rule changes section
(P) Promoted; (R) Relegated

=== Group L: Île-de-France ===
| Pos | Team | Pld | W | D | L | GF | GA | GD | PPG | Promotion or relegation |
|---|---|---|---|---|---|---|---|---|---|---|
| 1 | Versailles (P) | 18 | 13 | 3 | 2 | 35 | 7 | +28 | 2.33 | Promotion to National 2 |
| 2 | Ivry | 18 | 12 | 4 | 2 | 25 | 9 | +16 | 2.22 | |
| 3 | Paris FC (res) | 18 | 9 | 3 | 6 | 26 | 19 | +7 | 1.67 | |
| 4 | Créteil (res) | 17 | 8 | 4 | 5 | 20 | 14 | +6 | 1.65 | |
| 5 | Racing Club | 17 | 7 | 5 | 5 | 25 | 15 | +10 | 1.53 | |
| 6 | Blanc-Mesnil | 17 | 7 | 4 | 6 | 14 | 18 | −4 | 1.47 | |
| 7 | Les Ulis | 17 | 6 | 6 | 5 | 27 | 24 | +3 | 1.41 | |
| 8 | Les Mureaux | 17 | 6 | 3 | 8 | 17 | 18 | −1 | 1.24 (Note: Les Mureaux and Aubervilliers did not complete both their games. Both played seven away games out of a total of 17 games. Criteria 5 (Goal difference per game completed) applies: Les Mureaux -0.06, Aubervilliers -0.18.) | |
| 9 | Aubervilliers | 17 | 5 | 6 | 6 | 17 | 20 | −3 | 1.24 | |
| 10 | Paris Saint-Germain (res) | 17 | 5 | 5 | 7 | 21 | 24 | −3 | 1.18 | |
| 11 | Torcy (R) | 17 | 4 | 5 | 8 | 17 | 24 | −7 | 1.00 | Relegation to Regional 1 |
| 12 | Noisy-le-Grand (R) | 18 | 4 | 4 | 10 | 13 | 29 | −16 | 0.89 | Relegation to Regional 1 |
| 13 | Saint-Leu (R) | 18 | 4 | 2 | 12 | 11 | 26 | −15 | 0.78 | Relegation to Regional 1 |
| 14 | Boulogne-Billancourt (Note: On 27 November it was reported that Boulogne-Billancourt were penalised for a breach of rules regarding the qualifications of their first team coach. They were deducted five points.) (R) | 18 | 2 | 6 | 10 | 8 | 29 | −21 | 0.39 | Relegation to Regional 1 |

Source: Ligue de Paris Île-de-France
Rules for classification: see Special rule changes section
(P) Promoted; (R) Relegated

=== Group M: Auvergne-Rhône-Alpes ===
| Pos | Team | Pld | W | D | L | GF | GA | GD | PPG | Promotion or relegation |
|---|---|---|---|---|---|---|---|---|---|---|
| 1 | Rumilly-Vallières (P) | 18 | 12 | 2 | 4 | 43 | 19 | +24 | 2.11 (Note: Rumilly-Vallières and Hauts Lyonnais did not complete both games. Criteria 4 (number of away games completed) applies. Rumilly-Vallières completed 9, Hauts Lyonnais completed 8.) | Promotion to National 2 |
| 2 | Hauts Lyonnais | 18 | 12 | 2 | 4 | 46 | 22 | +24 | 2.11 | |
| 3 | Limonest | 18 | 10 | 4 | 4 | 31 | 19 | +12 | 1.89 | |
| 4 | Montluçon | 18 | 10 | 3 | 5 | 20 | 14 | +6 | 1.83 | |
| 5 | Vaulx-en-Velin | 18 | 8 | 6 | 4 | 23 | 17 | +6 | 1.67 | |
| 6 | Bourgoin-Jallieu | 18 | 8 | 5 | 5 | 26 | 20 | +6 | 1.61 | |
| 7 | Lyon-Duchère (res) | 18 | 6 | 5 | 7 | 17 | 21 | −4 | 1.28 | |
| 8 | Ain Sud | 18 | 5 | 7 | 6 | 23 | 25 | −2 | 1.22 | |
| 9 | Clermont (res) | 18 | 4 | 8 | 6 | 21 | 25 | −4 | 1.11 (Note: Clermont (res) and Chambéry did not complete both games. Both completed 9 away games. Criteria 5 (goal difference per game) applies. Clermont (res) -0.22 Chambéry -0.5) | |
| 10 | Chambéry | 18 | 4 | 8 | 6 | 15 | 24 | −9 | 1.11 | |
| 11 | Le Puy (res) (Note: Aurillac were reprieved by the relegation of Mulhouse from Championnat National 2 and the subsequent reprieve of Saint-Priest in that division. Le Puy (res) cannot be reprieved because (as it stands) their first team are not in Championnat National. If they get a reprieve in that division, then Le Puy will be reprieved here instead of Aurillac.) (R) | 18 | 5 | 4 | 9 | 15 | 27 | −12 | 1.06 | Relegation to Regional 1 |
| 12 | Aurillac | 18 | 4 | 5 | 9 | 23 | 22 | +1 | 0.94 | |
| 13 | Thiers (R) | 18 | 4 | 3 | 11 | 16 | 34 | −18 | 0.83 | Relegation to Regional 1 |
| 14 | Saint-Flour (R) | 18 | 1 | 4 | 13 | 20 | 50 | −30 | 0.39 | Relegation to Regional 1 |

Source: Ligue Auvergne-Rhône-Alpes de Football
Rules for classification: see Special rule changes section
(P) Promoted; (R) Relegated

== Top scorers ==
As of the termination of the season.

| Rank | Player | Club | Goals |
|---|---|---|---|
| 1 | (Senegal) Omar Wade | Gueugnon | 16 |
| 1 | (France) Johanne Akassou | Versailles | 16 |
| 3 | (France) Nelson Kabeya | Sablé | 15 |
| 3 | (France) Tony Lambard | Saint-Lô Manche | 15 |
| 5 | (France) Pierre Grellier | Bressuire | 14 |
| 5 | (France) Florian Jégu | Dinan-Léhon | 14 |
| 5 | (France) Arthur Dallois | Vire | 14 |
| 5 | (France) Alexis Poissonneau | TA Rennes | 14 |
| 9 | (France) Yanis Begraoui | Auxerre (res) | 13 |
| 9 | (Senegal) Pape Ibnou Bâ | Athlético Marseille | 13 |
| 9 | (France) David Gigliotti | Istres | 13 |
| 9 | (France) Thomas Vauvy | Saint-Lô Manche | 13 |
| 9 | (France) Charly Charrier | La Roche | 13 |

== Season outcomes ==
=== Promotion ===
Mont-de-Marsan, Châteaubriant, Bourges 18, Auxerre (res), Metz (res), Canet Roussillon, Beauvais, SM Caen (res), Plabennec, Versailles and Rumilly-Vallières finished in the promotion places, and were promoted to 2020–21 Championnat National 2, subject to ratification by the FFF and DNCG.

Athlético Marseille finished in a promotion place, but were initially denied promotion by the Commission Régionale de Contrôle des Clubs (CRCC) of the Ligue de Méditerranée and additionally administratively relegated to Régional 2 for financial irregularities. Their place was to have been taken by Aubagne. On 6 July 2020, the appeal committee of the Direction National du Controle de Gestion overturned this decision, and returned the file to the CRCC for reconsideration, putting the promotion position in Group D on hold. On 15 July 2020, the CRCC again denied the club promotion, handing the place back to Aubagne. The club appealed again, and on 27 July 2020 the appeal committee of the DNCG confirmed the promotion. Three days later, the disciplinary committee of the FFF announced that they were demoting the club back to National 3, due to the production of fraudulent documentation at the end of the 2018–19 season.

Tours finished in a promotion place, but were denied promotion by the Direction National du Controle de Gestion of the FFF. Their place was taken by Bourges 18.

=== Relegation ===
Bassin d'Arcachon, Pau (res), Mérignac Arlac, Les Herbiers (res), La Flèche, Saint-Cyr-sur-Loire, Dreux, Gémenos, EUGA Ardziv, Balagne, Sens, Roche-Novillars, FCM Troyenne, Sarreguemines, Aigues-Mortes, Béziers (res), Auch, Rodéo, Grande-Synthe, Le Portel, Chambly (res), Arras, Grand-Quevilly, Pacy Ménilles, Gonfreville, Trégunc, Ergué-Gabéric, Guichen, Torcy, Noisy-le-Grand, Saint-Leu, Boulogne-Billancourt, Le Puy (res), Aurillac, Thiers and Saint-Flour finished in the relegation places and were relegated to the top division of their respective regional leagues, subject to any reprieves detailed in the next section.

ASPV Strasbourg were confirmed as relegated on 6 July 2020, due to the confirmation on appeal of the relegation of Mulhouse from Championnat National 2.

=== Reprieves ===
Aurillac were reprieved from relegation on 16 June 2020, when Mulhouse were administratively relegated from Championnat National 2, which led to the reprieve from relegation of Saint-Priest.

A team may be reprieved in Group D following the eventual promotion of Athlético Marseille, however Gémenos have indicated they would reject this reprieve.
