= 2010–11 Championnat de France Amateur 2 =

Championnat de France amateur 2
- Season: 2010–11
- Champions: Chambéry
- Promoted: AC Amiens; Calais; Calvi; Concarneau; Dunkerque; Marseille Consolat; Mont-de-Marsan; Pontivy; Saumur; Strasbourg B; Valence; Valenciennes B
- Relegated: Alençon; Bagnols Pont; Bonchamp; Borgo; Brive; Changé; Dives; Douai; Évreux; Gueugnon B; Hazebrouck; Jura Dolois; La Trinité; La Châtaigneraie; Langon Castets; Lannion; La Valette; Le Puy; Les Lilas; Lesquin; Libourne-Saint-Seurin; Montluçon; Ornans; Pacy Vallée-d'Eure B; Prix-lès-Mézières; Quimper; Revel; Saint Marcel; Selongey; Toulouse Fontaines; Vauban Strasbourg
- Matches: 1,920
- Goals: 5,020 (2.61 per match)
- Biggest home win: Grenoble B 7–0 Saint-Marcel (7 November 2010); Guingamp B 7–0 Saint-Malo (8 January 2011)
- Biggest away win: Borgo 1–8 Furiani-Agliani (28 May 2011); Fréjus B 0–7 La Trinité (4 June 2011)
- Highest scoring: Illzach Modenheim 3–6 Troyes B (11 December 2010); Nîmes B 7–2 La Trinité (2 April 2011); La Trinité 7–2 Borgo (9 April 2011); La Trinité 6–3 Marseille Consolat (28 May 2011); Borgo 1–8 Furiani-Agliani (28 May 2011)
- Longest winning run: 6 games Andrézieux (22 August – 9 October)
- Longest unbeaten run: 16 games Valence (25 September – 16 March)
- Longest losing run: 12 games Bonchamp (21 August – 23 January)

The 2010–11 Championnat de France amateur 2 was the 13th edition since its establishment. The reserves of Metz were the defending champions. Due to the elongated appeals process involving each clubs' eligibility, the groups and fixtures were unveiled to the public on 15 July 2010 and the season began on 21 August and ended on 4 June 2011. There were 22 promoted teams from the regional leagues of the Division d'Honneur, replacing the 22 teams that were relegated from the Championnat de France amateur 2 following the 2009–10 season. A total of 130 teams competed in the league with 22 clubs suffering relegation to the sixth division, the Division d'Honneur. All non-reserve clubs that secured league status for the season were subject to approval by the DNCG before becoming eligible to participate.

== Changes in 2010–11 ==
=== Promotion and relegation ===
Teams relegated to Championnat de France amateur 2

- Balma
- Bordeaux B
- Calais^{1}
- Dunkerque
- Grenoble B
- Hyères^{1}
- Le Pontet
- Mantes
- Marck
- Montceau Bourgogne^{1}
- Montluçon^{1}
- Montpellier B
- Oissel^{1}
- Pontivy
- Quimper
- Racing Paris^{1}
- Strasbourg B
- Toulouse Fontaines

Teams promoted to Championnat de France amateur 2

- Bagnols Pont
- Bonchamp
- Borgo
- Brive
- Chambly
- Chartres
- Dinan-Léhon
- Forbach
- Grand-Synthe
- Granville
- Jura Dolois
- La Châtaigneraie
- Lannion
- Le Puy
- Lormont
- Paris B
- Prix-lès-Mézières
- Revel
- Saint Marcel
- Sablé-sur-Sarthe
- Schiltigheim
- Toulon-Le Las
- Vierzon

=== DNCG rulings ===
On 15 June 2010, following a study of each club's administrative and financial accounts in the Championnat de France amateur, the DNCG ruled that Besançon RC, Hyères FC, CS Louhans-Cuiseaux, FC Montceau Bourgogne, EDS Montluçon, Olympique Noisy-le-Sec, and RCF Paris would be relegated to the Championnat de France amateur 2. The organization also ruled that newly promoted club Calais RUFC would be excluded from ascending to the fourth division, while SO Cassis Carnoux, which had been relegated from the Championnat National, would also be excluded from the league. The second place club in Calais' group, CMS Oissel, who was set to replace Calais was also denied promotion to the Championnat de France amateur. All clubs had the option to appeal the decision.

On 7 July, Besançon, Hyères, and Oissel's appeals were heard by the DNCG Appeals Committee and, following deliberation and explanations from each club, the committee ruled in favor of Besançon, but upheld the appeals of Hyères and Oissel. The following day, the appeals committee granted both Louhans-Cuiseaux and Noisy-le-Sec appeals to stay in the fourth division. The committee, however, upheld the rulings of Calais, Montceau Bourgogne, Montluçon, and Racing Paris.

== League tables ==
=== Group A ===
Pos	Team	Pld	W	D	L	GF	GA	GD	Pts	Promotion or relegation
1	AC Amiens (P)	30	17	8	5	39	18	+21	89	Promotion to Championnat de France amateur
2	Dunkerque (P)	30	15	11	4	38	18	+20	86	Promotion to Championnat de France amateur
3	Oissel	30	13	10	7	39	25	+14	79	
4	Saint-Omer	30	13	4	13	46	47	−1	73	
5	Chartres	30	11	8	11	39	38	+1	71	
6	Dieppe	30	10	11	9	40	28	+12	71	
7	Bastia Reserves	30	10	11	9	38	39	−1	69 (Note: Bastia Reserves were docked two points.)	
8	Marck	30	10	8	12	33	35	−2	68	
9	Gravelines	30	9	11	10	32	39	−7	68	
10	Grande-Synthe	30	10	8	12	25	30	−5	68	
11	Beauvais Reserves	30	10	7	13	30	33	−3	67	
12	Paris FC Reserves	30	9	11	10	34	36	−2	68	
13	Évreux (R)	30	8	13	9	31	33	−2	67	Relegation to Division d'Honneur
14	Hazebrouck (R)	30	7	11	12	35	37	−2	62	Relegation to Division d'Honneur
15	Pacy Vallée-d'Eure Reserves (R)	30	8	9	13	30	41	−11	63	Relegation to Division d'Honneur
16	Dives (R)	30	7	5	18	33	65	−32	56	Relegation to Division d'Honneur

Updated to match(es) played on 6 June 2011. Source: French Football Federation
Rules for classification: 1) points; 2) goal difference; 3) number of goals scored.
(P) Promoted; (R) Relegated

=== Group B ===
Pos	Team	Pld	W	D	L	GF	GA	GD	Pts	Promotion or relegation
1	Calais	30	16	10	4	45	26	+19	88	
2	Valenciennes Reserves (P)	30	16	5	9	44	28	+16	83	Promotion to Championnat de France amateur
3	Racing Paris	30	13	11	6	43	29	+14	80	
4	Sedan Reserves	30	14	6	10	53	27	+26	78	
5	Roye-Noyon	30	14	6	10	40	34	+6	78	
6	Feignies	30	13	8	9	44	29	+15	77	
7	Wasquehal	30	12	9	9	40	26	+14	75	
8	Arras	30	12	9	9	40	29	+11	75	
9	Chambly	30	13	5	12	32	35	−3	74	
10	Sainte-Geneviève	30	11	9	10	40	31	+9	72	
11	Reims Reserves	30	12	6	12	39	45	−6	72	
12	Créteil Reserves	30	10	9	11	35	41	−6	69	
13	Lesquin (R)	30	10	9	11	30	37	−7	69	Relegation to Division d'Honneur
14	Les Lilas (R)	30	9	6	15	41	57	−16	63	Relegation to Division d'Honneur
15	Douai (R)	30	6	3	21	24	58	−34	51	Relegation to Division d'Honneur
16	Prix-lès-Mézières (R)	30	0	7	23	19	76	−57	37	Relegation to Division d'Honneur

Updated to match(es) played on 6 June 2011. Source: French Football Federation
Rules for classification: 1) points; 2) goal difference; 3) number of goals scored.
(P) Promoted; (R) Relegated

=== Group C ===
Pos	Team	Pld	W	D	L	GF	GA	GD	Pts	Promotion or relegation
1	Strasbourg Reserves (R)	30	17	7	6	47	21	+26	88	Relegation to Division d'Honneur
2	Dijon Reserves (P)	30	15	8	7	53	36	+17	83	Promotion to Championnat de France amateur
3	Sarre-Union	30	14	10	6	50	36	+14	82	
4	Saint-Louis Neuweg	30	14	7	9	45	37	+8	79	
5	Vesoul	30	11	13	6	42	35	+7	76	
6	Schiltigheim	30	13	7	10	37	29	+8	76	
7	Troyes Reserves	30	11	11	8	57	32	+25	74	
8	Auxerre Reserves	30	9	13	8	39	28	+11	70	
9	Forbach	30	11	6	13	33	45	−12	69	
10	Illzach Modenheim	30	10	8	12	49	49	0	68	
11	Jarville	30	10	5	15	37	54	−17	65	
12	Saint-Dizier	30	8	9	13	28	49	−21	63	
13	Saint-Dié	30	8	8	14	36	51	−15	62	
14	Selongey (R)	30	6	13	11	30	43	−13	61	Relegation to Division d'Honneur
15	Vauban Strasbourg (R)	30	6	9	15	30	42	−12	57	Relegation to Division d'Honneur
16	Jura Dolois (R)	30	5	8	17	32	60	−28	53	Relegation to Division d'Honneur

Updated to match(es) played on 6 June 2011. Source: French Football Federation
Rules for classification: 1) points; 2) goal difference; 3) number of goals scored.
(P) Promoted; (R) Relegated

=== Group D ===
Pos	Team	Pld	W	D	L	GF	GA	GD	Pts	Promotion or relegation
1	Chambéry (C)	32	23	4	5	68	24	+44	105	
2	Valence (P)	32	22	5	5	57	31	+26	103	Promotion to Championnat de France amateur
3	Montceau Bourgogne	32	21	7	4	59	28	+31	102	
4	Andrézieux	32	20	6	6	48	19	+29	98	
5	Vénissieux	32	18	5	9	41	26	+15	91	
6	Grenoble Reserves (R, L)	32	15	8	9	60	40	+20	85	Liquidated
7	Clermont Reserves	32	14	10	8	47	37	+10	84	
8	Thiers	32	14	4	14	35	34	+1	78	
9	Feurs	32	11	11	10	35	34	+1	76	
10	Cournon	32	12	6	14	40	34	+6	74	
11	Saint-Priest	32	11	6	15	43	54	−11	71	
12	Pontarlier	32	10	6	16	30	37	−7	68	
13	Imphy Decize	32	9	6	17	35	44	−9	65	
14	Ornans (R)	32	9	6	17	40	62	−22	65	Relegation to Division d'Honneur
15	Le Puy (R)	32	4	9	19	25	52	−27	53	Relegation to Division d'Honneur
16	Saint-Marcel (R)	32	3	4	25	21	70	−49	44 (Note: Saint-Marcel were docked two points.)	Relegation to Division d'Honneur
17	Gueugnon Reserves (R)	32	3	3	26	16	73	−57	35 (Note: Gueugnon Reserves forfeited the rest of its matches for the season following the club's liquidation.)	Relegation to Division d'Honneur

Updated to match(es) played on 6 June 2011. Source: French Football Federation
Rules for classification: 1) points; 2) goal difference; 3) number of goals scored.
(C) Champions; (L) Liquidated; (P) Promoted; (R) Relegated

=== Group E ===
Pos	Team	Pld	W	D	L	GF	GA	GD	Pts	Promotion or relegation
1	Calvi (P)	30	16	10	4	58	33	+25	88	Promotion to Championnat de France amateur
2	Marseille Consolat (P)	30	16	7	7	62	40	+22	85	Promotion to Championnat de France amateur
3	Nîmes Reserves	30	12	9	9	57	45	+12	75	
4	Toulon Le Las	30	12	7	11	42	38	+4	73	
5	Montpellier Reserves	30	12	7	11	53	41	+12	73	
6	Nice Reserves	30	10	10	10	32	40	−8	70	
7	Gardanne	30	11	7	12	45	56	−11	70	
8	Fréjus Reserves	30	11	7	12	30	43	−13	69 (Note: Fréjus B were docked one point.)	
9	Grasse	30	10	9	11	32	36	−4	69	
10	ÉF Bastia	30	11	6	13	37	51	−14	69	
11	Corte	30	10	9	11	35	45	−10	69	
12	Furiani-Agliani	30	10	7	13	43	41	+2	67	
13	Bagnols Pont (R)	30	10	7	13	37	38	−1	67	Relegation to Division d'Honneur
14	Trinité Sport (R)	30	10	8	12	53	50	+3	68	Relegation to Division d'Honneur
15	La Valette (R)	30	8	9	13	33	38	−5	63	Relegation to Division d'Honneur
16	Borgo (R)	30	8	6	16	47	67	−20	60	Relegation to Division d'Honneur

Updated to match(es) played on 6 June 2011. Source: French Football Federation
Rules for classification: 1) points; 2) goal difference; 3) number of goals scored.
(P) Promoted; (R) Relegated

=== Group F ===
Pos	Team	Pld	W	D	L	GF	GA	GD	Pts	Promotion or relegation
1	Mont-de-Marsan (P)	32	18	8	6	44	22	+22	94	Promotion to Championnat de France amateur
2	Bordeaux Reserves	32	19	4	9	51	31	+20	93	
3	Stade Bordelais	32	16	12	4	51	29	+22	92	
4	Trélissac	32	16	9	7	34	29	+5	89	
5	Balma	32	16	7	9	38	27	+11	87	
6	Toulouse Reserves	32	15	10	7	60	32	+28	87	
7	Bergerac	32	12	10	10	54	42	+12	78	
8	Mérignac	32	13	6	13	39	36	+3	77	
9	Agen	32	11	8	13	40	38	+2	73	
10	Saint-Alban	32	12	5	15	37	48	−11	73	
11	Lormont	32	11	5	16	47	56	−9	70	
12	Blagnac	32	8	12	12	42	45	−3	68	
13	Langon Castets (R)	32	7	10	15	35	50	−15	63	Relegation to Division d'Honneur
14	Revel (R)	32	7	13	12	30	50	−20	66	Relegation to Division d'Honneur
15	Brive (R)	32	8	9	15	33	49	−16	65	Relegation to Division d'Honneur
16	Libourne-Saint-Seurin (R)	32	7	9	16	25	49	−24	62	Relegation to Division d'Honneur
17	Toulouse Fontaines (R)	32	4	6	22	28	66	−38	50	Relegation to Division d'Honneur

Updated to match(es) played on 6 June 2011. Source: French Football Federation
Rules for classification: 1) points; 2) goal difference; 3) number of goals scored.
(P) Promoted; (R) Relegated

=== Group G ===
Pos	Team	Pld	W	D	L	GF	GA	GD	Pts	Promotion or relegation
1	Saumur (P)	28	18	6	4	55	20	+35	88	Promotion to Championnat de France amateur
2	Angers Reserves	28	16	6	6	51	30	+21	82	
3	Nantes Reserves	28	15	9	4	50	28	+22	82	
4	Tours Reserves	28	10	11	7	32	28	+4	69	
5	Poitiers	28	10	8	10	36	36	0	66	
6	Cholet	28	8	13	7	38	40	−2	65	
7	Vierzon	28	10	6	12	34	55	−21	64	
8	Châtellerault	28	11	2	15	40	50	−10	63	
9	Cognac	28	10	5	13	37	41	−4	63	
10	Châteauroux Reserves	28	7	14	7	32	28	+4	63	
11	Vertou	28	8	10	10	33	33	0	62	
12	Sablé-sur-Sarthe	28	9	7	12	35	33	+2	62	
13	Bourges	28	7	12	9	33	33	0	61	
14	La Châtaigneraie (R)	28	7	11	10	37	45	−8	60	Relegation to Division d'Honneur
15	Bonchamp (R)	28	2	4	22	33	66	−33	38	Relegation to Division d'Honneur
16	Montluçon (R)	0	0	0	0	0	0	0	0 (Note: On 24 March 2011, Montluçon were order by a tribunal to enter liquidation and cease activity within 15 days due to the club's insurmountable debt.)	Relegation to Division d'Honneur

Updated to match(es) played on 6 June 2011. Source: French Football Federation
Rules for classification: 1) points; 2) goal difference; 3) number of goals scored.
(P) Promoted; (R) Relegated

=== Group H ===
Pos	Team	Pld	W	D	L	GF	GA	GD	Pts	Promotion or relegation
1	Pontivy (P)	30	17	6	7	55	29	+26	87	Promotion to Championnat de France amateur
2	Concarneau (P)	30	13	11	6	35	25	+10	80	Promotion to Championnat de France amateur
3	Guingamp Reserves	30	14	7	9	63	32	+31	79	
4	Rouen Reserves	30	13	9	8	51	37	+14	78	
5	Granville	30	12	9	9	39	36	+3	75	
6	Saint-Malo	30	13	6	11	41	44	−3	75	
7	Brest Reserves	30	12	8	10	40	40	0	74	
8	Dinan-Léhon	30	12	7	11	35	37	−2	73	
9	Vitré	30	10	11	9	37	30	+7	71	
10	Montagnarde	30	13	2	15	39	38	+1	71	
11	Mondeville	30	10	9	11	39	31	+8	69	
12	Laval Reserves	30	10	8	12	34	44	−10	68	
13	Lannion (R)	30	9	10	11	37	43	−6	67	Relegation to Division d'Honneur
14	Alençon (R)	30	8	10	12	43	52	−9	64	Relegation to Division d'Honneur
15	Changé (R)	30	8	6	16	26	55	−29	60	Relegation to Division d'Honneur
16	Quimper (R)	30	4	5	21	29	70	−41	47	Relegation to Division d'Honneur

Updated to match(es) played on 6 June 2011. Source: French Football Federation
Rules for classification: 1) points; 2) goal difference; 3) number of goals scored.
(P) Promoted; (R) Relegated

== Notes ==
- Administratively relegated to the league by the DNCG.
