= Stade Jacques Ambroggi =

Football stadium in Monticello, France

- Interactive map of Stade Jacques Ambroggi
- Location: Monticello, Corsica, France
- Coordinates: 42°37′50″N 8°57′06″E
- Capacity: 1,500
- Surface: Artificial turf

Construction
- Opened: 1946
- Renovated: 2014

Tenant
- FC Balagne (1976–present)

The Stade Jacques Ambroggi (Corsican: Stadiu Ghjacumu Ambrogi) is a stadium in Monticello on the French island of Corsica. It is the home ground of football club FC Balagne. The stadium, with 1,500 seats and inaugurated in 1946. It was named in 1986 after Jacques Ambrogi, mayor of L'Île-Rousse from 1947 to 1965.
