= 2018–19 Championnat National 2 =

Championnat National 2
- Season: 2018–19
- Dates: 11 August 2018 – 25 May 2019
- Champions: Créteil
- Promoted: Créteil; Toulon; Le Puy; Bastia-Borgo
- Relegated: 11 teams (see outcomes section)
- Top goalscorer: 27 goals Pape Ibnou Ba, Athlético Marseille
- Biggest home win: Lyon (res) 6–0 Pontarlier; Group A, Round 4, 1 September 2018; Lyon (res) 6–0 Fréjus Saint-Raphaël; Group A, Round 6, 15 September 2018
- Biggest away win: Arras 0–6 Créteil; Group D, Round 19, 16 February 2019
- Highest scoring: 9 goals Saint-Priest 2–7 Jura Sud; Group A, Round 15, 22 December 2018; Grasse 3–6 Olympic Marseille (res); Group A, Round 26, 20 April 2019; Fleury 5–4 Arras; Group D, Round 30, 25 May 2019
- All statistics correct as of 09:10, 4 June 2019 (UTC).

The 2018–19 Championnat National 2 is the 21st season of the fourth tier in the French football league system. The competition is contested by 64 clubs split geographically across 4 groups of 16 teams each. The teams included amateur clubs (although a few are semi-professional) and the reserve teams of professional clubs.

== Teams ==
On 13 July, the FFF ratified the constitution of the competition, and published the groups as follows:

- 49 clubs who were neither relegated or promoted from the 2017–18 Championnat National 2 groups.
- 3 teams relegated from 2017–18 Championnat National (Les Herbiers, Marseille Consolat, Créteil).
- 12 teams promoted from 2017–18 Championnat National 3. (Bordeaux (res), Nantes (res), Blois, Endoume Marseille, Pontarlier, Haguenau, Nîmes (res), Feignies Aulnoye, Oissel, Vannes, Bobigny and Saint-Étienne (res)).

== League tables ==
=== Group A ===
Pos	Team	Pld	W	D	L	GF	GA	GD	Pts	Promotion or relegation
1	Toulon (P)	30	16	11	3	43	25	+18	59	Promotion to National
2	Fréjus Saint-Raphaël	30	17	6	7	51	38	+13	57	
3	Annecy (Note: Annecy were penalised for fielding a suspended player in the opening game of the season on 11 August 2018 against Martigues. The original scoreline was 0–0. Martigues were awarded the game by the score 3–0 and Annecy were deducted a penalty point.)	30	15	9	6	50	34	+16	53	
4	Jura Sud	30	13	11	6	43	30	+13	50	
5	Athlético Marseille	30	14	5	11	57	46	+11	47	
6	Endoume Marseille	30	11	11	8	42	34	+8	44	
7	Hyères	30	11	8	11	29	33	−4	41	
8	Saint-Priest	30	11	7	12	39	42	−3	40	
9	Martigues (Note: On 11 December 2018 the FFF announced that Martigues had been penalised one point due to failing to meet the financial requirements of the competition.)	30	10	11	9	40	30	+10	40	
10	Grasse	30	10	9	11	35	42	−7	39	
11	Chasselay MDA	30	11	6	13	32	39	−7	39	
12	Lyon (res)	30	10	7	13	56	47	+9	37	
13	Olympic Marseille (res)	30	10	5	15	50	57	−7	35	
14	Monaco (res)	30	9	6	15	44	52	−8	33	
15	Pontarlier (R)	30	5	7	18	20	53	−33	22	Relegation to National 3
16	Nice (res) (R)	30	5	5	20	41	70	−29	20	Relegation to National 3

Source: FFF.fr
Rules for classification: 1) points; 2) head-to-head results; 3) head-to-head goal difference; 4) goal difference; 5) number of goals scored; 6) fair play points; 7) draw
(P) Promoted; (R) Relegated

=== Group B ===
Pos	Team	Pld	W	D	L	GF	GA	GD	Pts	Promotion or relegation
1	Le Puy (P)	30	14	10	6	34	19	+15	52	Promotion to National
2	Les Herbiers	30	14	8	8	41	27	+14	50	
3	Andrézieux	30	14	6	10	39	33	+6	48	
4	Yzeure	30	12	11	7	32	29	+3	47	
5	Sète	30	11	13	6	37	28	+9	46	
6	Blois	30	13	6	11	43	39	+4	45	
7	Saint-Pryvé	30	12	8	10	33	27	+6	44	
8	Bergerac	30	11	9	10	37	33	+4	42	
9	Saint-Étienne (res)	30	10	11	9	41	36	+5	41	
10	Colomiers	30	11	7	12	31	32	−1	40	
11	Stade Bordelais	30	11	5	14	27	34	−7	38	
12	Romorantin	30	8	13	9	28	25	+3	37	
13	Trélissac	30	9	10	11	28	31	−3	37	
14	Nîmes (res)	30	9	6	15	26	41	−15	33	
15	Bordeaux (res) (R)	30	6	8	16	21	38	−17	26	Relegation to National 3
16	Mont-de-Marsan (R)	30	6	7	17	26	52	−26	25	Relegation to National 3

Source: FFF.fr
Rules for classification: 1) points; 2) head-to-head results; 3) head-to-head goal difference; 4) goal difference; 5) number of goals scored; 6) fair play points; 7) draw
(P) Promoted; (R) Relegated

=== Group C ===
Pos	Team	Pld	W	D	L	GF	GA	GD	Pts	Promotion or relegation
1	Nantes (res) (Note: Reserve teams cannot be promoted higher than Championnat National 2)	30	15	10	5	45	24	+21	55	
2	Bastia-Borgo (P)	30	15	9	6	57	35	+22	54	Promotion to National
3	Chartres	30	15	7	8	50	38	+12	52	
4	Saint-Brieuc	30	14	8	8	53	33	+20	50	
5	Lorient (res)	30	12	11	7	38	24	+14	47	
6	Oissel	30	12	5	13	39	37	+2	41	
7	Vannes	30	10	10	10	47	49	−2	40	
8	Mantes	30	11	6	13	29	39	−10	39	
9	Poissy	30	10	9	11	35	36	−1	39	
10	Granville	30	10	8	12	47	58	−11	38	
11	Saint-Malo	30	9	10	11	40	42	−2	37	
12	Vitré	30	8	12	10	34	45	−11	36	
13	Paris Saint-Germain (res)	30	8	9	13	39	47	−8	33 (Note: Paris Saint-Germain (res) 3–0 Furiani-Agliani, Furiani-Agliani 2–2 Paris Saint-Germain (res).)	
14	Furiani-Agliani (R)	30	8	9	13	31	43	−12	33	Relegation to National 3
15	Boulogne-Billancourt (R)	30	8	5	17	36	51	−15	29	Relegation to National 3
16	Le Havre (res) (R)	30	7	8	15	29	48	−19	29	Relegation to National 3

Source: FFF.fr
Rules for classification: 1) points; 2) head-to-head results; 3) head-to-head goal difference; 4) goal difference; 5) number of goals scored; 6) fair play points; 7) draw
(P) Promoted; (R) Relegated

=== Group D ===
Pos	Team	Pld	W	D	L	GF	GA	GD	Pts	Promotion or relegation
1	Créteil (C, P)	30	17	8	5	55	21	+34	59	Promotion to National
2	Saint-Maur	30	13	10	7	55	37	+18	49	
3	Sedan	30	12	11	7	39	29	+10	47	
4	Lille (res) (Note: Lille (res) were deducted two points (with a further two point deduction suspended) by the FFF at a hearing on 25 October 2018, due to irregularities in the designation of their head coach. The decision was confirmed on appeal on 23 November 2018. Lille (res) were further penalised for fielding a player not included on the teamsheet in the game against Lens (res) on 9 March 2019. The original scoreline was 3–2. The revised scoreline was 0–3 and Lille (res) were deducted a penalty point. Lille (res) were penalised again for fielding a suspended player against Saint-Maur on 23 March 2019. The original scoreline was 2–1. The revised scoreline was 0–3 and Lille (res) were deducted a penalty point.)	30	13	11	6	48	36	+12	46	
5	Sainte-Geneviève	30	13	6	11	38	39	−1	45	
6	Croix	30	13	4	13	38	44	−6	43	
7	Schiltigheim	30	11	9	10	40	38	+2	42	
8	Épinal	30	11	9	10	33	37	−4	42	
9	Reims (res)	30	11	8	11	34	36	−2	41	
10	Fleury	30	9	12	9	46	50	−4	39	
11	Lens (res)	30	10	7	13	46	44	+2	37	
12	Belfort	30	8	11	11	24	31	−7	35	
13	Bobigny (Note: On 18 December 2018 the FFF announced that Bobigny had been penalised one point due to failing to meet the financial requirements of the competition.)	30	9	8	13	33	44	−11	34	
14	Haguenau	30	7	10	13	35	42	−7	31	
15	Feignies Aulnoye (R)	30	7	10	13	33	43	−10	31	Relegation to National 3
16	Arras (R)	30	3	12	15	35	63	−28	21	Relegation to National 3

Source: FFF.fr
Rules for classification: 1) points; 2) head-to-head results; 3) head-to-head goal difference; 4) goal difference; 5) number of goals scored; 6) fair play points; 7) draw
(C) Champions; (P) Promoted; (R) Relegated

== Season Outcomes ==
=== Champions and promotions ===
The champion of Championnat National 2 is decided by measuring performance of each group winner in matches against the top 6 clubs in their group.

As of 25 May 2019.

Pos	Team	Pld	Pts	GD	GF	GA
1	Créteil	10	15	2	15	13
2	Nantes (res)	10	12	0	10	10
3	Le Puy	10	12	0	9	9
4	Toulon	10	12	0	8	8

Créteil are champions of 2018–19 Championnat National 2 and are promoted to 2019–20 Championnat National.

Le Puy, Toulon and Bastia-Borgo are promoted to 2019–20 Championnat National.

=== Relegation ===
Monaco (res), Pontarlier, Nice (res), Nîmes (res), Bordeaux (res), Mont-de-Marsan, Furiana-Agliani, Boulogne-Billancourt, Le Havre (res), Haguenau, Feignies Aulnoye and Arras finished in the relegation places and will be relegated to 2019–20 Championnat National 3 subject to any reprieves in the next section.

=== Reprieves ===
Any reprieves required due to administrative relegations, mergers or clubs folding are decided by taking, in order, the 14th placed clubs ranked by order of their record against clubs finishing 9th to 13th position in their group, followed by the 15th placed clubs ranked by order of their record against clubs finishing in 10th to 14th position in their group.

On 24 May 2019, Paris Saint-Germain (res) announced they would not be registering for Championnat National 2 next season, meaning an automatic reprieve for the best 14th placed team, Monaco (res).

Also on 24 May 2019, the body responsible for governance of clubs in French football, the DNCG, administratively relegated Mantes due to financial arrears. The club successfully appealed this decision on 3 July 2019.

On 4 June 2019, the DNCG administratively relegated Jura Sud, subject to appeal. The club successfully appealed this decision, as announced on 8 July 2019.

On 12 June 2019, the DNCG administratively relegated Martigues, subject to appeal. The club successfully appealed this decision on 3 July 2019.

On 25 June 2019, the DNCG administratively relegated Athlético Marseille, subject to appeal, and also gave Tours an administrative relegation on top of their relegation from Championnat National, subject to appeal. This was confirmed at appeal on 11 July 2019, confirming the reprieve of Nîmes (res).

On 11 July 2019, the DNCG appeal committee confirmed the earlier decision of the DNCG to give an administrative relegation to Tours FC in addition to their sporting relegation from 2018–19 Championnat National, meaning they will play in Championnat National 3 for the 2019–20 season, which causes the reprieve of Haguenau.

==== Best 14th placed team ====
As of 25 May 2019.

Pos	Team	Pld	Pts	GD	
1	Monaco (res)	10	15	-1	Reprieved
2	Nîmes (res)	10	14	-1	Reprieved
3	Haguenau	10	12	1	Reprieved
4	Furiana-Agliani	10	9	-3	

==== Best 15th placed team ====
As of 25 May 2019.

Pos	Team	Pld	Pts	GD
1	Feignies Aulnoye	10	12	1
2	Pontarlier	10	11	-11
3	Boulogne-Billancourt	10	9	-4 (Note: Goals for 10)
4	Bordeaux (res)	10	9	-4 (Note: Goals for 4)

== Top scorers ==
As of end of season.

Rank	Player	Club	Goals
1	(Senegal) Pape Ibnou Bâ	Athlético Marseille	27
2	(France) Benjamin Genghini	Schiltigheim	21
2	(France) Sébastien Persico	Saint-Malo	21
4	(France) Gwenn Foulon	Bastia-Borgo	18
5	(France) Tony Do Pilar Patrao	Le Puy	17
5	(France) Steve Papin	Chartres	17
7	(Ivory Coast) Achille Anani	Marseille Endoume	16
7	(France) Cedric Odzoumo	Bastia-Borgo	16
7	(France) Jérémy Bekhechi	Sedan	16
10	(France) Jordan Popineau	Blois	14
