= FJE =

FJE or FJÉ may refer to:

- FJE Group of Companies, named after Fred J. Elizalde, parent of MBC Media Group
- FJE Building, Makati, Philippines, location of DZRH from 1988 to 2002
- FJE, ICAO code for British airline Flyjet
- FJE, ICAO code for Kenyan airline Fanjet Express
- FJÉ Biguglia, football team in 2024–25 Coupe de France preliminary rounds, Corsica
- FJE, division code for Fengjie County, China
- FJE, code for Nijlen railway station
