= Église Saint-François-Xavier de Monticello =

Church in Haute-Corse, France

Coordinates: 42°37′01″N 8°57′18″E

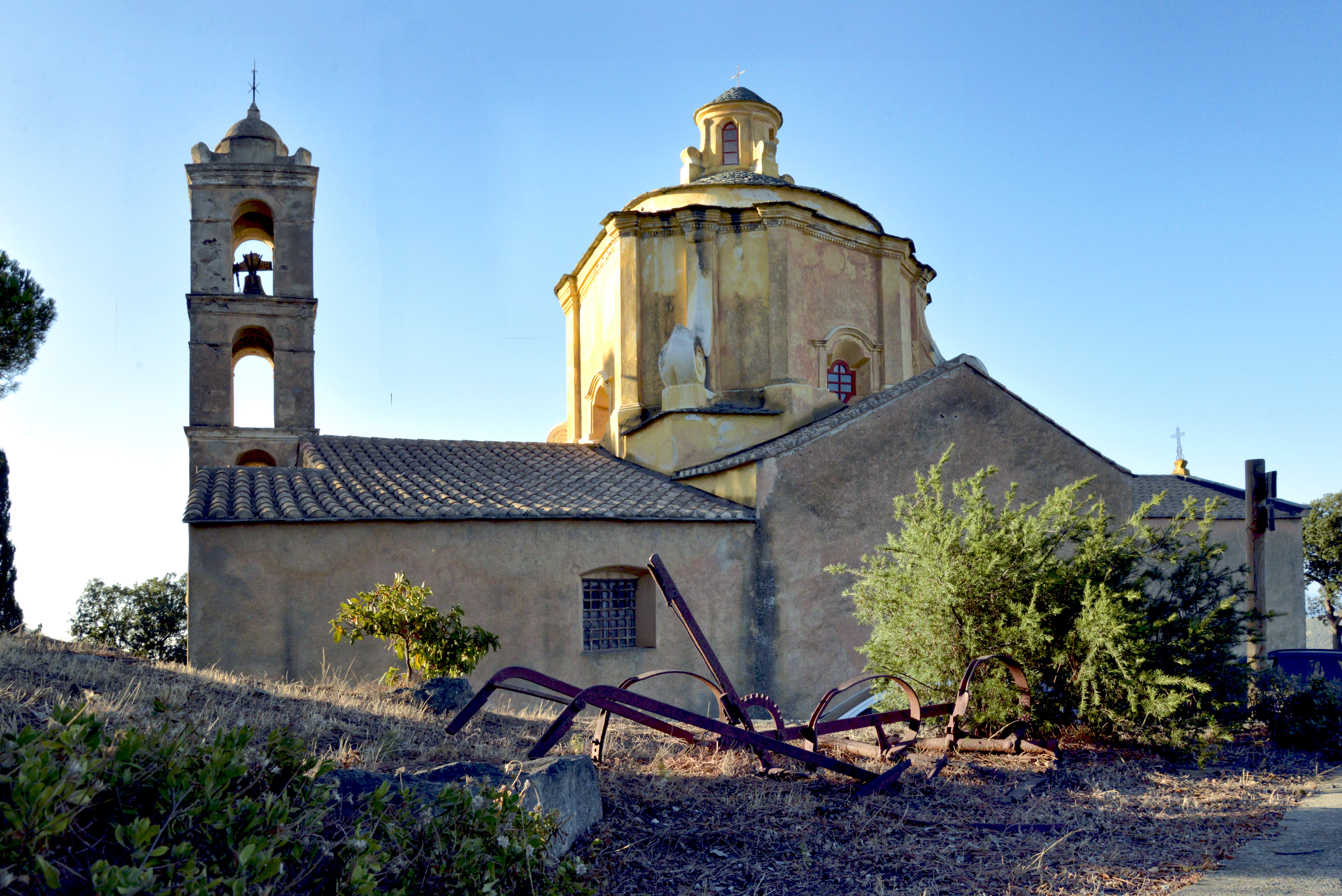
Église Saint-François-Xavier de Monticello

Église Saint-François-Xavier de Monticello is a church in Monticello, Haute-Corse, Corsica. The building was classified as a Historic Monument in 1992.
