= Torra di Saleccia =

Genoese coastal defence tower in Corsica

Tower of Saleccia
- Torra di Saleccia (Corsican)
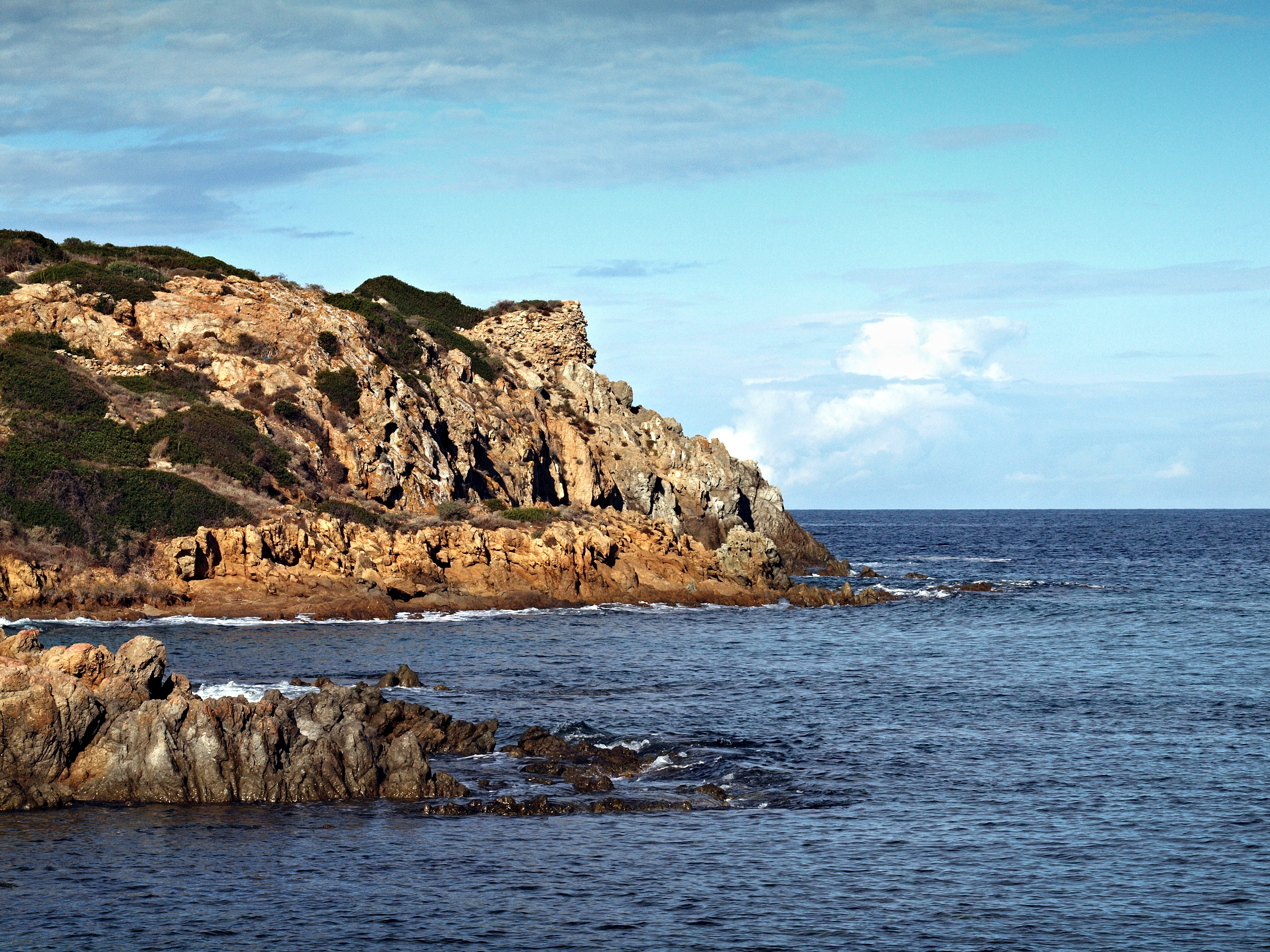

- Location within Corsica
- 42.639421°N 8.975889°E

History
- Built: Second half of 16th century

The Tower of Saleccia (Corsican: Torra di Saleccia) is a ruined Genoese tower located in the commune of Monticello on the west coast of the Corsica. Only part of the base survives.

The tower was one of a series of coastal defences constructed by the Republic of Genoa between 1530 and 1620 to stem the attacks by Barbary pirates.

== See also ==
- List of Genoese towers in Corsica
