= Monticello, Haute-Corse =

Monticello U Munticellu (Corsican)
- Commune
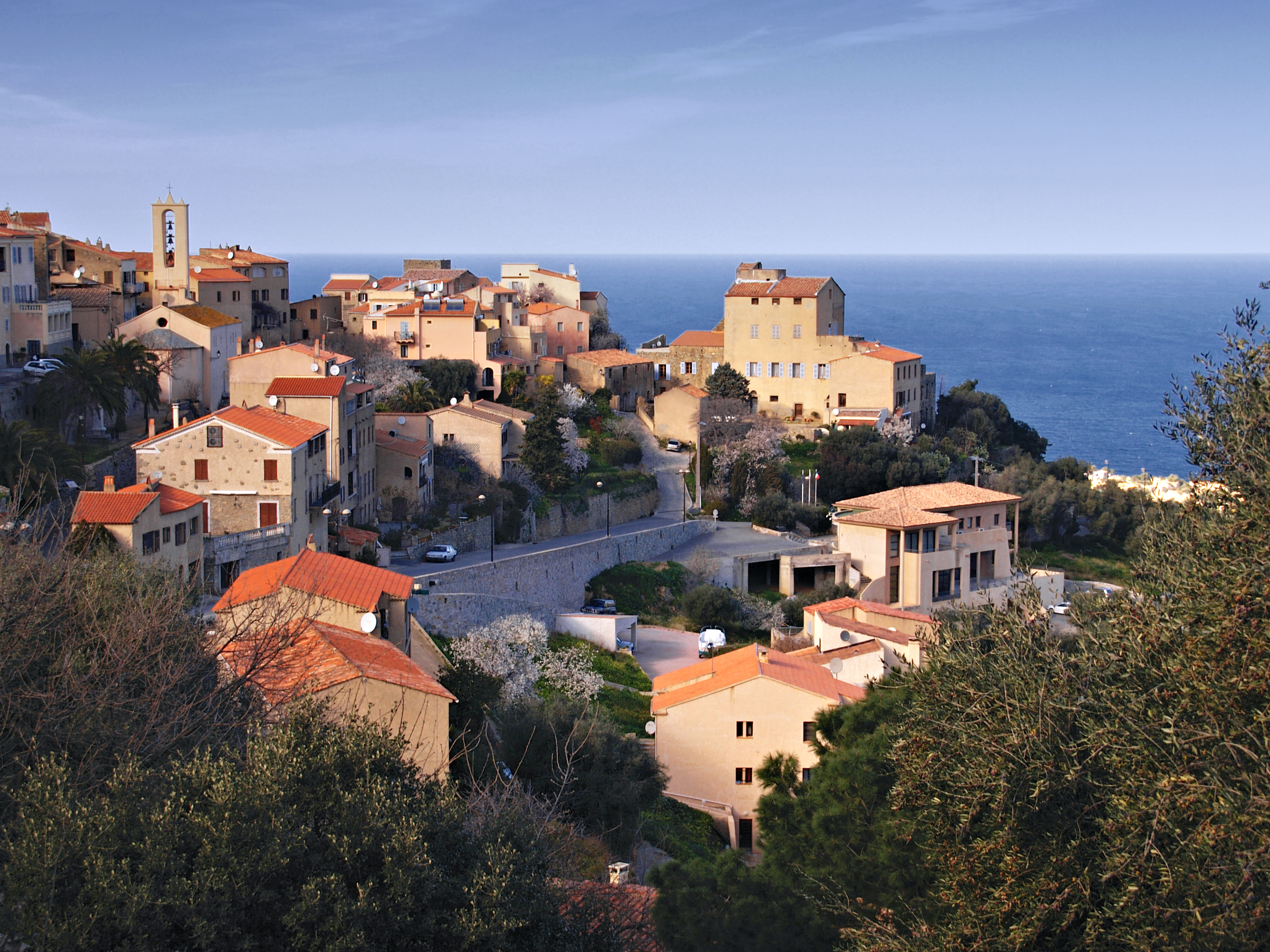
- The village of Monticello
- Location of Monticello
- Location within France Location within Corsica
- Coordinates: 42°37′05″N 8°57′16″E
- Country: France
- Region: Corsica
- Department: Haute-Corse
- Arrondissement: Calvi
- Canton: L'Île-Rousse

Government
  - Mayor (2020–2026): Joseph Mattei
- Area^{1}: 10.64 km^{2} (4.11 sq mi)
- Elevation: 120 m (390 ft)
- Highest elevation: 408 m (1,339 ft)
- Lowest elevation: 0 m (0 ft)
- Population (2023): 2,065
  - Density: 194.1/km^{2} (502.7/sq mi)
- Time zone: UTC+01:00 (CET)
  - Summer (DST): UTC+02:00 (CEST)
- INSEE/Postal code: 2B168 /20220
- ^{1} French Land Register data, which excludes lakes, ponds, glaciers > 1 km^{2} (0.386 sq mi or 247 acres) and river estuaries.

Monticello (Corsican: U Munticellu) is a commune in the Haute-Corse department of France on the island of Corsica.

== History ==
The area has been inhabited since the Neolithic period.

In 1541, Monticello was raided and set aflame by the Barbary pirates led by the Turkish admiral Dragut.

== Population ==
Historical population
Year	Pop.	±% p.a.
1968	237	—
1975	251	+0.82%
1982	500	+10.35%
1990	944	+8.27%
1999	1,253	+3.20%
2007	1,665	+3.62%
2012	1,740	+0.89%
2017	1,923	+2.02%
2023	2,065	+1.19%
Source: INSEE

== Monuments ==
- Tour de Saleccia
- Église Saint-François-Xavier de Monticello

== See also ==
- Communes of the Haute-Corse department
