= ÉF Bastia =

- Full name: Étoile Filante Bastiaise
- Founded: 1920
- Dissolved: 2020
- Ground: Stade François Monti
- Capacity: 1,000
- Chairman: Eugene Schneider
- Manager: Frédéric Née
- League: Regional 1, Corsica
- 2018–19: National 3 Group D, 13th (relegated)
- Website: https://etoile-filante-bastiaise.footeo.com
| Home colours | Away colours |

Étoile Filante Bastiaise or ÉF Bastia was a French association football club from Biguglia, Corsica. Founded in 1920, they last played in the Regional 1, Corsica in the sixth tier of the French football league system, following relegation in 2019. They played at the Stade François Monti, which has a capacity of 1,000.

Between 1961 and 1971, ÉF Bastia merged with SC Bastia to become SEC Bastia. In 1971, the two clubs separated and continued.

In 2020 the club merged with Association de la Jeunesse de Biguglia from the same town, forming a new club Football Jeunesse Étoile Biguglia.
