= FC Borgo =

Football club based in Borgo, Corsica, France

- Full name: Football Club de Borgo
- Short name: FCB
- Founded: 3 July 2017; 8 years ago
- Ground: Stade Paul-Antoniotti
- Capacity: 2,000
- Chairman: José Orsini
- Manager: Alexandre Torres
- League: Championnat National 1
- 2024–25: National 3 Group D, 1st of 14 (Promoted)
Home colours	Away colours	Third colours

Football Club de Borgo (French pronunciation: [futbol klœb bɔʁgo]) is a French football club based in Borgo, Haute-Corse on the island of Corsica. The club was founded in July 2017 by the merger of CA Bastia and Borgo FC. As of the 2026–27 season, Borgo competes in the Championnat National 1.

== History ==
Upon its creation in 2017, the team began playing in the Championnat National 2, the fourth tier of the French football league system. In the 2018–19 season, the team won promotion as runner-up in its group, one point behind Nantes' reserve team who were ineligible to rise any higher. The team finished in the final relegation place of the 2021–22 Championnat National season, but were reprieved from relegation due to the Direction Nationale du Contrôle de Gestion decision to relegate FC Sète 34.

On 23 July 2022, FC Bastia-Borgo changed its name to FC Borgo ahead of the 2022–23 season.

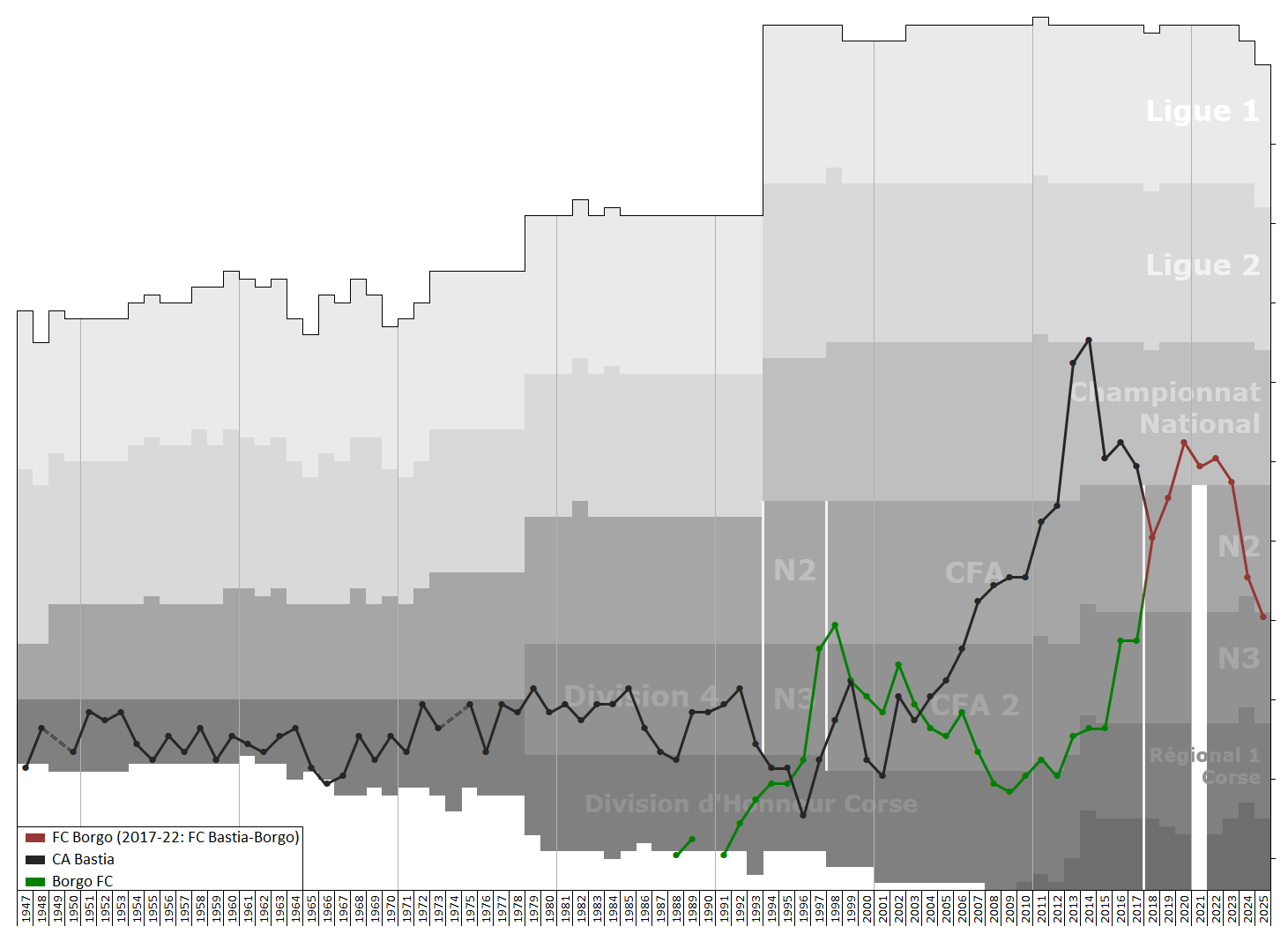
Historical league performance chart of FC Borgo and CA Bastia

== Crest ==
Crest of FC Bastia-Borgo (2017–2022)

== Current squad ==
As of 1 February 2026

Note: Flags indicate national team as defined under FIFA eligibility rules; some limited exceptions apply. Players may hold more than one non-FIFA nationality.

No.	Pos.	Nation	Player
1	GK	FRA	Andrea Scarpitta
2	DF	SUI	Jérémy Mizrahi
3	MF	FRA	Fabio Perotto
5	DF	FRA	Alexandre Jourda
6	MF	FRA	Valentin Prenant-Caporossi
7	DF	FRA	Hugo Morales
8	MF	MLI	Cherif Doumbia
9	FW	FRA	Walter Collovigh
10	FW	FRA	Jean-Jacques Rocchi
11	MF	BRA	Vinicius Lansade
12	FW	FRA	Francescu Barboni
17	FW	FRA	Eldji Dia

No.	Pos.	Nation	Player
18	MF	FRA	Inza Diarrassouba
19	FW	FRA	Carlu Antò Savelli
20	DF	FRA	Julien Prenant-Caporossi
22	MF	FRA	Charles Vinciguerra
23	MF	FRA	Mounir El Hajjami
24	MF	FRA	Éros Esposito
25	DF	BFA	Guy-Marcel Bayala
26	MF	ALG	Younès Khedir
27	DF	COM	Karim Mohamed
29	FW	FRA	Enzo Pinochi
30	GK	FRA	Enzo Garrido
—	DF	FRA	Hugo Monteiro
