= FC Balagne =

Football club based in France

- Full name: Football Club Balagne
- Founded: 1976; 50 years ago
- Ground: Stade Jacques Ambroggi
- Capacity: 1,500
- Chairman: René Navarro
- Manager: Dragan Cvetkovic
- League: National 2 Group E
- 2025–26: National 3 Group E, 10th
Home colours	Away colours

FC Balagne is a French football club based in L'Île-Rousse, Haute-Corse, Corsica. It was known as FB Île Rousse during the period between 2008 and 2018, and under other names prior to that. As of the 2026–2027 season, the club play in Championnat National 2.

== History ==
The club was founded as FA Île-Rousse in 1976.

Their best period so far was in the mid-1990s, when they made it to the Championnat de France de football National, the third tier of French football. After gaining promotion in 1996, the club merged with AS Monticello and became known as FA Île-Rousse Monticello. They remained just one season at the third level, being relegated again in 1997.

After a string of poor results and attendances, the club was forced to declare bankruptcy in 2008. It reformed in the Corsican regional league as Football Balagne Île-Rousse. The club climbed to Division d'Honneur Corsica in 2010, and to Championnat de France Amateur 2 in 2013.

On 22 January 2014, in the Last 32 of the Coupe de France, the club defeated top-flight club and tournament holders Girondins de Bordeaux 4–3 on penalties after a 0–0 draw at Stade Ange Casanova in Ajaccio.

In July 2018, the club merged with Football Club Squadra Calvi to form Football Club Balagne.

In May 2019 FC Balagne were champions of Régional 1 Corsica, and gained promotion to Championnat National 3. They were relegated after just one season at the higher level, being bottom of the group when the season was terminated early due to the COVID-19 pandemic.

== Important dates ==
- 1976: Club founded as FA Île-Rousse; played in Division d'Honneur in Corsica
- 1986: Promoted to Championnat de France de football de Division 4 (CFA2) as champions of Division d'Honneur in Corsica
- 1993: Promoted to Championnat de France amateur de football (CFA) as champions of Division 4
- 1995: Promoted to Championnat de France de football National after finishing third in the CFA
- 1996: Merger with AS Monticello (founded in 1988 as FA IRM)
- 1997: Relegated to CFA after finishing 11th in National Groupe B
- 2005: Relegated to CFA 2 after finishing 17th in CFA Groupe C
- 2006: Renovation of Stade Jacques Ambroggi (new pitch, new dressing rooms, new offices)
- 2008: Bankruptcy of club after finishing 16th and last in CFA2 Groupe D; club reformed as FBIR
- 2010: Promotion to DH (Division d'Honneur) of the Ligue Corse de Football
- 2013: Champions of DH and promotion to CFA2
- 2018: Relegated from National 3 to Ligue Corse de Football Regional 1

== Honours ==
- Champions of Division 4 Groupe H: 1993
- Champions of Ligue Corse de Football: 1984, 1985, 1986, 2013
- Winners of the Coupe de Corse: 1985, 1986, 1987
- Champions of PHA (Promotion Honneur A): 2010
