= GC Lucciana =

Football club based in Lucciana, France

Lucciana
- Full name: Gallia Club de Lucciana
- Founded: 1929
- Stadium: Stade Charles Galletti
- Capacity: 1,500
- President: Pierre Joseph Santini
- League: National 3 Group A
- 2022–23: National 3 Group D, 7th
- Website: www.galliaclublucciana.fr

Gallia Club de Lucciana is a football club based in Lucciana, a town on the French island of Corsica. As of the 2021–22 season, it competes in the Championnat National 3, the fifth tier of the French football league system. Founded in 1929, the club's colours are red and white.

== History ==
Gallia Club de Lucciana was founded in 1929. In 1988, the club merged with CA Bastia to form CA Bastia Gallia Lucciana. However, the club refound its independence in 2003.

In 2016, Lucciana won the Coupe de Corse. In 2017, the club achieved promotion to the Championnat National 3, the fifth tier of football in France.

== Honours ==
GC Lucciana honours
Honour	No.	Years
Coupe de Corse	1	2016
