= USC Corte =

- Full name: Union Sportive des Clubs du Cortenais
- Founded: 1908
- Ground: Parc des Sports des Chabrières; Corte
- Capacity: 1,000
- Chairman: Jacques François Colombani
- Manager: David Faderne
- League: Régional 1
- 2024–25: National 3 Group J, 13th of 14 (Relegated)
- Website: https://usccorti.footeo.com
| Home colours | Away colours |

Union Sportive des Clubs du Cortenais is a French association football team founded in 1908. It is based in Corte, Haute-Corse, France. The club currently plays in Régional 1, the sixth tier of football in France. They were finally promoted in 2020, after controversially being denied promotion in 2019, despite winning a decision via the Corsica league appeal board, which was later overturned by the FFF. It plays at the Parc des Sports de Chabrières in Corte, which has a capacity of 1,000.

The club was originally called US Corte, but changed its name in 1998 after it merged with amateur side FC Corte Castrila.
