= AS Furiani-Agliani =

French football club, based in Furiani, Corsica

Furiani-Agliani
- Full name: Association Sportive de Furiani-Agliani
- Founded: 1987
- Ground: Stade du Bastio, Furiani, Corsica
- Chairman: Philippe Ferroni
- Manager: Romain Paturel
- League: National 2 Group C
- 2023–24: National 2 Group D, 3rd of 14
- Website: https://furiani-agliani.footeo.com
| Home colours | Away colours |

Association Sportive de Furiani-Agliani is a French association football club. They are based in the town of Furiani, located on the island of Corsica and their home stadium is the Stade du Bastio. As of the 2024–25 season, they play in the National 2 Group C.

== Current squad ==
As of 27 February 2025

Note: Flags indicate national team as defined under FIFA eligibility rules; some limited exceptions apply. Players may hold more than one non-FIFA nationality.

| No. | Pos. | Nation | Player |
|---|---|---|---|
| 1 | GK | FRA | Victor Hocepied |
| 2 | DF | FRA | Anthony Feliciano |
| 3 | DF | FRA | Hugo Vicart |
| 4 | DF | FRA | Thibault Valery |
| 6 | DF | MAR | Othman Aankour |
| 7 | FW | FRA | Soufiane Nouala |
| 8 | MF | FRA | Fabio Teixeira Lopes |
| 10 | MF | FRA | Marc Jourdan |
| 11 | FW | FRA | Joël Viana |
| 12 | MF | FRA | Valère Pollet |
| 13 | DF | FRA | Thomas Berenguier |

| No. | Pos. | Nation | Player |
|---|---|---|---|
| 17 | DF | FRA | Arnaud Binet |
| 18 | MF | FRA | Jacer Jebabli |
| 19 | DF | FRA | Vivien Tétart |
| 20 | FW | FRA | Sébastien da Silva |
| 23 | DF | FRA | Esteban Marre |
| 24 | DF | FRA | Jason Peyronnet |
| 25 | MF | POR | Romain da Silva Pereira |
| 26 | FW | FRA | Axel Thoumin (on loan from Nîmes) |
| 29 | FW | FRA | Steve Delacour |
| 30 | GK | FRA | Jean-Louis Carlotti |
| 40 | GK | FRA | Théo Chatelain (on loan from Laval) |

== Notable players ==
- (France) Geoffrey Kondo
