= 2017–18 Coupe de France =

Tournament details
- Country: France

Final positions
- Champions: Paris Saint-Germain (12th title)
- Runners-up: Les Herbiers VF

Tournament statistics
- Matches played: 195
- Goals scored: 650 (3.33 per match)
- Top goal scorer(s): Said Idazza; Ángel Di María (7 goals each)

The 2017–18 Coupe de France was the 101st season of the most prestigious football cup competition of France. The competition was organised by the French Football Federation (FFF) and was open to all clubs in French football, as well as clubs from the overseas departments and territories (Guadeloupe, French Guiana, Martinique, Mayotte, New Caledonia (winner of 2017 New Caledonia Cup), Tahiti (winner of 2017 Tahiti Cup), Réunion, and Saint Martin).

Paris Saint-Germain were the defending champions, and won their 4th consecutive final and record 12th title overall with a 2–0 win over Les Herbiers VF in the final.

== Teams ==
=== Round 1 to 6 ===
The first six rounds, and any preliminaries, are organised by the Regional Leagues and the Overseas Territories, who allow teams from within their league structure to enter at any point up to the third round. Teams from Championnat National 3 enter at the third round, those from Championnat National 2 enter at the fourth round and those from Championnat National enter at the fifth round.

=== Round 7 ===
The 145 qualifiers from the 6th round of the Regional Leagues are joined by the 11 qualifiers from the Overseas Territories and the 20 teams from Ligue 2.

==== Ligue 2 ====
- Ajaccio
- Auxerre
- Bourg-en-Bresse
- Brest
- Châteauroux
- Clermont
- Gazélec Ajaccio
- Le Havre
- Lens
- Lorient
- Nancy
- Nîmes
- Niort
- Orléans
- Paris FC
- Quevilly-Rouen
- Reims
- Sochaux
- Tours
- Valenciennes

==== Regional Leagues ====
Figures in parentheses indicate the tier of the French football league system the team play at.

Nouvelle-Aquitaine: 12 teams

- Bergerac Périgord FC (4)
- Stade Bordelais (4)
- Limoges FC (4)
- Angoulême CFC (5)
- Aviron Bayonnais FC (5)
- FC Bressuire (5)
- CS Feytiat (5)
- FCE Mérignac Arlac (5)
- La Brède FC (6)
- Langon FC (6)
- Stade Ygossais (8)
- FC Pays Argentonnais (10)

Pays de la Loire: 11 teams

- SO Cholet (3)
- Stade Lavallois (3)
- Les Herbiers VF (3)
- Le Mans FC (4)
- US Changé (5)
- Ancienne Château-Gontier (6)
- TVEC Les Sables-d'Olonne (6)
- JSC Bellevue Nantes (6)
- Olympique Saumur FC (6)
- AC Chapelain Foot (7)
- FC Essartais (7)

Corsica: 2 teams

- AS Furiani-Agliani (4)
- GC Lucciana (5)

Grand Est: 20 teams

- SAS Épinal (4)
- US Raon-l'Étape (4)
- FC Saint-Louis Neuweg (4)
- SC Schiltigheim (4)
- CSO Amnéville (5)
- ASC Biesheim (5)
- RC Épernay Champagne (5)
- FCSR Haguenau (5)
- FC Mulhouse (5)
- FC Trémery (5)
- Chaumont FC (6)
- US Forbach (6)
- FC Hégenheim (6)
- Étoile Naborienne St Avold (6)
- ES Thaon (6)
- FCA Troyes (6)
- FC Geispolsheim 01 (7)
- US Ittenheim (8)
- UL Rombas (8)
- FC Still 1930 (8)

Centre-Val de Loire: 4 teams

- FC Chartres (4)
- SO Romorantin (4)
- Avoine OCC (5)
- Vierzon FC (5)

Bourgogne-Franche-Comté: 8 teams

- ASM Belfort (4)
- CO Avallon (5)
- FC Gueugnon (5)
- CA Pontarlier (5)
- FC Grandvillars (6)
- FC Morteau-Montlebon (6)
- Sud Nivernais Imphy Decize (6)
- FC 4 Rivières 70 (7)

Hauts-de-France: 20 teams

- US Boulogne (3)
- FC Chambly (3)
- USL Dunkerque (3)
- Arras FA (4)
- AS Beauvais Oise (4)
- Feignies Aulnoye FC (5)
- Saint-Amand FC (5)
- USM Senlisienne (5)
- AC Cambrai (6)
- US Chantilly (6)
- US Choisy-au-Bac (6)
- AFC Compiègne (6)
- SC Hazebrouck (6)
- Entente Itancourt-Neuville (6)
- Olympique Marcquois (6)
- US Vimy (6)
- FC Porto Portugais Amiens (7)
- OS Fives (7)
- US Nœux-les-Mines (7)
- FC Quarouble (9)

Occitanie: 11 teams

- Rodez AF (3)
- US Colomiers Football (4)
- Tarbes Pyrénées Football (4)
- Olympique Alès (5)
- Balma SC (5)
- Canet Roussillon FC (5)
- AS Fabrègues (5)
- FC Alberes Argelès (6)
- SC Anduzien (7)
- Montauban FCTG (7)
- AS Tournefeuille (7)

Normandy: 8 teams

- US Avranches (3)
- US Granville (4)
- Évreux FC 27 (5)
- FC Rouen (5)
- FC Saint-Lô Manche (5)
- LC Bretteville-sur-Odon (6)
- ASPTT Caen (6)
- AF Virois (6)

Méditerranée: 5 teams

- Marseille Consolat (3)
- FC Martigues (4)
- AS Gémenos (5)
- US Marseille Endoume (5)
- AS Cagnes-Le Cros (7)

Brittany: 14 teams

- US Concarneau (3)
- Stade Briochin (4)
- US Saint-Malo (4)
- AS Vitré (4)
- Saint-Colomban Sportive Locminé (5)
- Vannes OC (5)
- Stade Pontivyen (6)
- Stella Maris Douarnenez (7)
- FC Quimperlois (7)
- Plancoët-Arguenon FC (7)
- CS Plédran (7)
- US Liffré (8)
- AS Plomelin (8)
- Séné FC (8)

Paris-Île-de-France: 11 teams

- L'Entente SSG (3)
- FC Fleury 91 (4)
- US Lusitanos Saint-Maur (4)
- FCM Aubervilliers (5)
- Blanc Mesnil SF (5)
- Racing Colombes 92 (5)
- CO Les Ulis (5)
- US Rungis (6)
- St Brice FC (6)
- AC Houilles (8)
- ASC La Courneuve (10)

Auvergne-Rhône-Alpes: 19 teams

- AS Lyon-Duchère (3)
- Grenoble Foot 38 (3)
- ASF Andrézieux (4)
- Annecy FC (4)
- Le Puy Foot 43 Auvergne (4)
- FC Villefranche (4)
- AS Yzeure (4)
- FC Chamalières (5)
- Cluses-Scionzier FC (6)
- Hauts Lyonnais (6)
- AS Bron Grand Lyon (7)
- US Feurs (7)
- FC La Tour-St Clair (7)
- AC Seyssinet (7)
- AS Sud Ardèche (7)
- ES Tarentaise (7)
- FC Vallée de la Gresse (7)
- FC Valdaine (8)
- Football Mont-Pilat (9)

==== Overseas Territories teams ====
French Guiana: 2 teams

- ASE Matoury (R1)
- ASC Le Geldar (R1)

Martinique: 2 teams

- Club Colonial (R1)
- Golden Lion FC (R1)

Guadeloupe: 2 teams

- L'Etoile de Morne-à-l'Eau (R1)
- CS Moulien (R1)

Réunion: 2 teams

- AS Excelsior (R1)
- AJ Petite-Île (R1)

Mayotte: 1 team

- Diables Noirs (DH)

New Caledonia: 1 team

- AS Lössi

(French Polynesia) Tahiti: 1 team

- A.S. Tefana

== Seventh round ==
The draw for the seventh round is made in two parts. First the Overseas teams are drawn against opponents from the French League structure who have applied to potentially travel overseas. Those French teams not drawn in this part are re-entered into the main draw.

The draw for the overseas teams took place on 25 October 2017. The main draw for the seventh round took place on 26 October 2017.

Ties took place on 10, 11 and 12 November 2017, with matches postponed from those dates being rescheduled for 18 and 19 November.

=== Ties involving overseas teams ===
11 November 2017	A.S. Tefana (TL1) (French Polynesia)	0–3	Rodez AF (3)	Pirae, French Polynesia
15:00 UTC−10:00		Report	Poujol 48'; Da Silva 62'; Ruffaut 81'	Stadium: Stade Pater Te Hono Nui; Attendance: 700; Referee: François Letexier

12 November 2017	AJ Petite-Île (R1) (Réunion)	0–1	AS Beauvais Oise (4)	Saint-Pierre, Réunion
18:00 RET		Report	Ewagnignon 62'	Stadium: Stade Michel Volnay; Attendance: 3,500; Referee: Pierre Gaillouste

11 November 2017	L'Etoile de Morne-à-l'Eau (R1) (Guadeloupe)	1–4	FC Saint-Lô Manche (5)	Les Abymes, Guadeloupe
20:00 ECT	Loison 78'	Report	Coulibaly 15' (pen.); Marie 16'; Bopu 23'; Vauvy 44'	Stadium: Stade René Serge Nabajoth; Attendance: 2,000; Referee: Faouzi Benchabane

11 November 2017	Club Colonial (R1) (Martinique)	2–3	ASM Belfort (4)	Fort-de-France, Martinique
19:00 ECT	Dondon 13' (pen.); Charles 51'	Report	Keyoubi 37', 90+3'; Houri 40'	Stadium: Stade Pierre-Aliker; Attendance: 2,000; Referee: Mehdi Mokhtari

11 November 2017	ASE Matoury (R1) (French Guiana)	0–0 (a.e.t.) (3–2 p)	US Avranches (3)	Remire-Montjoly, French Guiana
17:00 GFT		Report		Stadium: Stade Municipal Dr. Edmard Lama; Attendance: 400; Referee: Cédric Dos Santos

11 November 2017	US Concarneau (3)	7–0	(Martinique) Golden Lion FC (R1)	Concarneau
18:30 CET	Idazza 31', 35', 39'; Lasimant 57'; Donisa 62', 77'; Koré 70'	Report		Stadium: Stade Guy Piriou; Attendance: 1,050; Referee: Jeremy Stinat

11 November 2017	L'Entente SSG (3)	7–1	(New Caledonia) AS Lössi (SL)	Sannois
17:00 CET	Kaboré 15', 36'; Ouédraogo 19', 42'; Sea 25'; Dieye 55'; Farade 62'	Report	Wamowe 90'	Stadium: Parc des Sports Michel Hidalgo; Attendance: 900; Referee: Yann Flament

11 November 2017	Stade Briochin (4)	9–1	(French Guiana) ASC Le Geldar (R1)	Saint-Brieuc
18:00 CET	Poussevin 9', 16', 28', 29', 36'; Rouxel 11', 34'; Le Méhauté 17'; Allée 65'	Report	Souvenson 61'	Stadium: Fred-Aubert Stadium; Attendance: 1,100; Referee: Marc Michout

11 November 2017	SAS Épinal (4)	6–2	(Guadeloupe) CS Moulien (R1)	Épinal
18:00 CET	Tango 25', 90+1'; Labhiri 28'; Fofana 39'; Segbé Azankpo 60', 62'	Report	Passape 4'; Gómez 67' (pen.)	Stadium: Stade de la Colombière; Attendance: 300; Referee: Alexandre Mercier

11 November 2017	Feignies Aulnoye FC (5)	1–3	(Réunion) AS Excelsior (R1)	Feignies
17:00 CET	Sadsaoud 12'	Report	Dahri 2', 40' (pen.); Malet 90+5'	Stadium: Complexe Sportif Didier Eloy; Attendance: 466; Referee: Emmanuel Esneu

11 November 2017	SO Romorantin (4)	10–1	(Mayotte) Diables Noirs (DH)	Romorantin-Lanthenay
18:00 CET	Kehound 30' (pen.), 50'; Charpentier 33'; Souyeux 40'; Kibundu 42'; Touré 45'; Cuvier 57', 85'; Halby 69'; Grasso 75'	Report	Soumaila 27'	Stadium: Stade Jules Ladoumègue; Attendance: 1,230; Referee: Marc Bollengier

=== Main draw ===
The main draw was split into 10 regional groups, with the split primarily ensuring an equal distribution of clubs from the different tiers, and secondarily grouping by geography.

==== Group 7A ====
12 November 2017	Plancoët-Arguenon FC (7)	0–3	US Changé (5)	Plancoët
14:00 CET		Report	Laribi 30'; Prosarpio 57'; Lion 84'	Stadium: Stade Joseph Samson; Attendance: 1,124; Referee: Jordan Riche

12 November 2017	Stella Maris Douarnenez (7)	0–4	Lorient (2)	Douarnenez
14:30 CET		Report	Hamel 9', 16', 27'; Cabot 14'	Stadium: Stade Xavier Trellu; Attendance: 2,678; Referee: Yohann Rouinsard

12 November 2017	AS Plomelin (8)	0–5	US Saint-Malo (4)	Plomelin
14:30 CET		Report	Caroff 12'; Diakité 13'; N'Joh-Eboa 64'; Vermet 81'; Touré 85'	Stadium: Stade Pennaguer Bihan; Attendance: 1,300; Referee: Samir Zolota

11 November 2017	AS Vitré (4)	5–1	Saint-Colomban Sportive Locminé (5)	Vitré
18:00 CET	Rouger 18'; Menoret 42'; Maïga 70', 72'; Le Bacle 83'	Report	Goba 67'	Stadium: Stade Municipal; Attendance: 576; Referee: Aurélien Grizon

12 November 2017	CS Plédran (7)	0–5	Brest (2)	Saint-Brieuc
17:00 CET		Report	Autret 37'; Pi 50'; H. Diallo 75'; Charbonnier 89', 90+2'	Stadium: Stade Fred Aubert; Attendance: 3,500; Referee: Benjamin Lepaysant

11 November 2017	Stade Pontivyen (6)	0–3	Stade Lavallois (3)	Pontivy
18:00 CET		Report	Bosetti 10'; Pandor 87'; Sarr 90' (pen.)	Stadium: Stade du Faubourg de Verdun; Attendance: 1,850; Referee: Julien Garrigues

12 November 2017	US Liffré (8)	1–2	Vannes OC (5)	Liffré
14:30 CET	Le Scornet 29'	Report	Dufrennes 18'; Coué 75'	Stadium: Stade Nelson Paillou; Attendance: 1,030; Referee: Pierre Legat

12 November 2017	Séné FC (8)	3–2 (a.e.t.)	FC Quimperlois (7)	Séné
14:00 CET	Sorel 28' (pen.); Bocéno 86'; Essola 117'	Report	Yhuel 14'; Kerhoas 45'	Stadium: Stade Alphonse Le Derf; Attendance: 1,000; Referee: Kevin Barbin

==== Group 7B ====
11 November 2017	AC Seyssinet (7)	2–3	Bourg-en-Bresse (2)	Seyssinet-Pariset
19:00 CET	Dubrulle 67'; Correnti 78'	Report	Amiot 37'; Heinry 80'; Merdji 90+2'	Stadium: Stade Joseph Guetat; Attendance: 1,350; Referee: Willy Delajod

11 November 2017	Annecy FC (4)	1–3	Grenoble Foot 38 (3)	Annecy
18:00 CET	Jacob 43'	Report	Sotoca 47', 75'; David 65'	Stadium: Parc des Sport; Attendance: 1,528; Referee: Alexandre Castro

11 November 2017	FC Villefranche (4)	1–2	Sochaux (2)	Villefranche-sur-Saône
16:00 CET	Djabour 12'	Report	Ruiz 39'; Alphonse 84'	Stadium: Stade Armand Chouffet; Attendance: 1,200; Referee: Alexandre Perreau Niel

11 November 2017	CA Pontarlier (5)	2–1	FC Mulhouse (5)	Pontarlier
17:00 CET	Coly 46' (pen.); Vieille 49'	Report	Da Silva 77'; M'Tir (red card) 81'	Stadium: Stade Paul Robbe; Attendance: 600; Referee: Dimitri Kristo

11 November 2017	ES Tarentaise (7)	2–0	FC 4 Rivières 70 (7)	Moûtiers
17:00 CET	Bozkurt 10'; Vallier 73'	Report	Asdrubal (red card) 50'	Stadium: Stade Joseph Bardassier; Attendance: 1,400; Referee: Edgar Barenton

12 November 2017	FC Vallée de la Gresse (7)	2–2 (a.e.t.) (0–3 p)	Cluses-Scionzier FC (6)	Varces-Allières-et-Risset
14:00 CET	Zoratti 68'; Portaz 78'	Report	Leloucy 16'; Gana 79'	Stadium: Stade Municipal; Attendance: 600; Referee: Daniel Ramon

11 November 2017	FC Grandvillars (6)	1–3	FC Morteau-Montlebon (6)	Grandvillars
17:00 CET	Josephine 32'	Report	Wailo 17'; Chapatte 38'; Bonnet 55'	Stadium: Stade Léon Gelot; Attendance: 600; Referee: Anthony Ustaritz

12 November 2017	FC Hégenheim (6)	2–3	FC Saint-Louis Neuweg (4)	Hégenheim
14:00 CET	Kalenga 44' (o.g.); Steiner 45'	Report	Richard 7' (o.g.); Solvet 25', 40'	Stadium: Stade de l`Eisweiher; Attendance: 337; Referee: Joachim Caffe Pierson

==== Group 7C ====
11 November 2017	AS Yzeure (4)	1–0	Clermont (2)	Yzeure
18:00 CET	Millot 86'	Report		Stadium: Stade de Bellevue; Attendance: 1,264; Referee: Aurélien Petit

12 November 2017	Chaumont FC (6)	0–3	Le Puy Foot 43 Auvergne (4)	Chaumont
14:00 CET		Report	Pierre-Louis 45+3'; N'Doye 67', 90+4'	Stadium: Stade Georges Dodin; Attendance: 500; Referee: Grégoire Valleteau

11 November 2017	US Feurs (7)	1–2	AS Lyon-Duchère (3)	Feurs
17:00 CET	Causevic 72'	Report	Mendes 62'; Bekhechi 67'	Stadium: Stade Maurice Rousson; Attendance: 862; Referee: William Lavis

12 November 2017	AS Bron Grand Lyon (7)	0–3	Sud Nivernais Imphy Decize (6)	Bron
14:00 CET		Report	Garcia 8'; Wade 31'; Meindu 45'	Stadium: Stade Pierre Duboeuf; Attendance: 300; Referee: Ahmed Taleb

12 November 2017	CO Avallon (5)	1–1 (a.e.t.) (4–2 p)	Hauts Lyonnais (6)	Avallon
14:00 CET	Hattab 62'	Report	Mangara 19'	Stadium: Stade Léon Laurent; Attendance: 500; Referee: Jules Telliez

11 November 2017	FC La Tour-St Clair (7)	0–1	FC Gueugnon (5)	Saint-Jean-de-Soudain
14:00 CET		Report	Soumah 36'	Stadium: Stade Gérifondière; Attendance: 926; Referee: Yazid El Mrabet

11 November 2017	FC Chamalières (5)	1–3	Auxerre (2)	Cournon d'Auvergne
17:00 CET	Tawaba 90+3'	Report	Ayé 65'; Philippoteaux 80'; Polomat 89'	Stadium: Stade Joseph et Michel Gardet; Attendance: 948; Referee: Romain Delpech

12 November 2017	Football Mont-Pilat (9)	0–6	ASF Andrézieux (4)	Saint-Maurice-l'Exil
14:30 CET		Report	Bennekrouf 17', 35', 48'; Dedola 32'; Kaye 66', 75'	Stadium: Stade Robert Margarit; Attendance: 650; Referee: Antoine Valnet

==== Group 7D ====
11 November 2017	CSO Amnéville (5)	1–3 (a.e.t.)	SC Schiltigheim (4)	Amnéville
16:00 CET	Abdelkadous 90+6'	Report	Genghini 30'; Krasso 99'; Blaudet 114'	Stadium: Stade Municipal; Attendance: 400; Referee: Loic Mouton

12 November 2017	FC Geispolsheim 01 (7)	0–2	Reims (2)	Geispolsheim
14:30 CET		Report	Ngamukol 19'; Siebatcheu 73'	Stadium: Centre Sportif Geispolsheim; Attendance: 2,200; Referee: Thierry Bouille

19 November 2017	FC Still 1930 (8)	2–0	Étoile Naborienne St Avold (6)	Still
14:00 CET	Maisonneuve 48'; Phillips 62'	Report	Potier (yellow card) 23' (yellow-red card)	Stadium: Stade Lafarge; Attendance: 300; Referee: Renaud Potier

11 November 2017	RC Épernay Champagne (5)	0–2	US Raon-l'Étape (4)	Épernay
18:00 CET		Report	Dufour 30'; Géhin 90'	Stadium: Stade Paul Chandon; Attendance: 273; Referee: Brendan Roffet

12 November 2017	UL Rombas (8)	2–0	ES Thaon (6)	Rombas
14:00 CET	Fortes 81'; Djabou 84' (pen.); Hay (red card) 87'	Report		Stadium: Stade du Fond Saint Martin; Attendance: 300; Referee: Damien Rossini

11 November 2017	US Ittenheim (8)	0–2	FCSR Haguenau (5)	Ittenheim
18:30 CET		Report	Hayef 24'; Tine 48'	Stadium: Stade du Parc de Loisirs; Attendance: 422; Referee: William Toulliou

11 November 2017	US Forbach (6)	0–1	Nancy (2)	Forbach
17:00 CET		Report	Bassi 2'	Stadium: Stade du Schlossberg; Attendance: 2,000; Referee: Bastien Dechepy

11 November 2017	FC Trémery (5)	0–1	ASC Biesheim (5)	Trémery
14:00 CET	Moussaoui (yellow card) 90' (yellow-red card)	Report	Jacquat 89'	Stadium: Stade Municipale; Attendance: 314; Referee: Nicolas Brotons

==== Group 7E ====
12 November 2017	FCE Mérignac Arlac (5)	1–4	Tarbes Pyrénées Football (4)	Mérignac
14:00 CET	Castera 72'	Report	Delanys 1', 43'; Duchemin 78'; Koulibaly 83'	Stadium: Stade Joseph Antoine Cruchon; Attendance: 600; Referee: Yohan Gagnant

11 November 2017	Aviron Bayonnais FC (5)	0–2	Stade Bordelais (4)	Bayonne
18:00 CET	Lubrano (red card) 90+3'	Report	Janin 3', 90+2'; Blasco (red card) 90+3'	Stadium: Stade Didier Deschamps; Attendance: 800; Referee: Abdelatif Kherradji

11 November 2017	Balma SC (5)	0–3	Les Herbiers VF (3)	Balma
18:30 CET		Report	Rocheteau 10'; Bonnet 23'; Eickmayer 30'	Stadium: Stade Municipal de Balma; Attendance: 558; Referee: Floris Aubin

11 November 2017	Montauban FCTG (7)	0–0 (a.e.t.) (3–4 p)	La Brède FC (6)	Montauban
18:00 CET		Report		Stadium: Stade Georges Pompidou; Attendance: 420; Referee: Abdelkarim Bouzalmat

11 November 2017	Langon FC (6)	0–1	US Colomiers Football (4)	Langon
14:00 CET	Vimes (yellow card) 68' (yellow-red card)	Report	Cardinali 35'; Lacroix (yellow card) 70' (yellow-red card)	Stadium: Stade Octave Octavin; Attendance: 255; Referee: Alexis Brouard

11 November 2017	Stade Ygossais (8)	0–3	Paris FC (2)	Mont-de-Marsan
20:00 CET		Report	Lavigne 14', 64'; Ech-Chergui 45+1'	Stadium: Complexe Sportif de l'Argenté; Attendance: 500; Referee: Arnaud Baert

11 November 2017	AS Tournefeuille (7)	1–5	Niort (2)	Tournefeuille
15:00 CET	Monié 7'; Meslem (yellow card) 67' (yellow-red card)	Report	Lamkel Zé 29'; Roye 42'; Diakité 50'; Grange 82', 85'	Stadium: Stade Municipal; Attendance: 850; Referee: Florent Batta

==== Group 7F ====
12 November 2017	JSC Bellevue Nantes (6)	2–2 (a.e.t.) (1–2 p)	Limoges FC (4)	Saint-Herblain
14:00 CET	Oudji 84'; Gibert 120'	Report	Manai 64' (o.g.); Lajugie (yellow card) 89' (yellow-red card); Oussama Belfoul 101'	Stadium: Stade de l'Orvasserie; Attendance: 700; Referee: Julien Schmitt

12 November 2017	FC Pays Argentonnais (10)	0–8	Tours (2)	Bressuire
14:30 CET		Report	Makhedjouf 5'; Tandia 7'; Louviou 9'; Tall 17', 86'; N'Doye 30'; El Hriti 51'; Poisbleau 90+1' (o.g.)	Stadium: Stade Alain Métayer; Attendance: 1,710; Referee: Romain Galibert

11 November 2017	TVEC Les Sables-d'Olonne (6)	1–2 (a.e.t.)	Olympique Saumur FC (6)	Les Sables-d'Olonne
19:30 CET	Nikiema 43'; Corbes (red card) 53'	Report	Youla 66'; Dupuis 105'	Stadium: Stade de La Roudilière; Attendance: 551; Referee: Arnaud Merre

11 November 2017	Avoine OCC (5)	2–3 (a.e.t.)	Châteauroux (2)	Avoine
19:00 CET	Do Couto 8'; Kouyate 52'	Report	Mandanne 35'; Benrahma 48', 104'	Stadium: Stade Marcel Vignaud; Attendance: 1,500; Referee: Sylvain Palhies

12 November 2017	FC Essartais (7)	3–2 (a.e.t.)	Ancienne Château-Gontier (6)	Essarts-en-Bocage
14:30 CET	Baruxakis 28' (pen.), 67'; Vallot 112'		Oger 21', 42'	Stadium: Stade Municipal; Attendance: 1,100; Referee: Lakhdar El Bedoui

12 November 2017	AC Chapelain Foot (7)	0–2	Bergerac Périgord FC (4)	La Chapelle-sur-Erdre
15:00 CET		Report	Badin 23'; Chehata 90+5'	Stadium: Stade Buisson de la Grolle; Referee: Paul Garo

12 November 2017	CS Feytiat (5)	1–6	SO Cholet (3)	Feytiat
14:00 CET	Faye 46' (pen.)	Report	Paillot 16'; Aabiza 20'; Bakir 31'; Gómez 60', 73'; Sarr 90+3'	Stadium: Stade Roger Couderc; Attendance: 262; Referee: Sofien Benchabane

11 November 2017	Angoulême CFC (5)	2–0	FC Bressuire (5)	Angoulême
19:00 CET	Franco 85'; Nomel 90+4'	Report		Stadium: Stade Lebon; Attendance: 850; Referee: Julien Rouquette

==== Group 7G ====
12 November 2017	AS Cagnes-Le Cros (7)	1–4	Gazélec Ajaccio (2)	Cagnes-sur-Mer
14:00 CET	Jeausseran 17'	Report	Diabaté 27', 78'; Anziani 71'; Jobello 90+1'	Stadium: Stade Pierre Sauvaigo; Attendance: 1,000; Referee: Eric Wattellier

11 November 2017	Canet Roussillon FC (5)	3–0	Olympique Alès (5)	Canet-en-Roussillon
19:00 CET	Bruxeda 32'; Vie 55'; Barbier 90'	Report	Ferreira (red card) 68'	Stadium: Stade Saint-Michel; Attendance: 262; Referee: Remi Landry

11 November 2017	FC Valdaine (8)	0–4	AS Fabrègues (5)	Montélimar
18:00 CET		Report	Diawara 45'; Kassa 51'; Gomez 68'; Cloix 70'; Derrar (red card) 81'	Stadium: Stade Alexandre Tropenas; Attendance: 1,000; Referee: Maxime Apruzzese

12 November 2017	FC Alberes Argelès (6)	3–2 (a.e.t.)	US Marseille Endoume (5)	Argelès-sur-Mer
14:00 CET	Niakaté 83'; Krini 87'; Mendes 120'; Rouquier (yellow card) 120+1' (yellow-red card)	Report	Anani 55'; Tourtour 80'	Stadium: Stade du Marasquer; Attendance: 431; Referee: Matthieu Bonnetin

12 November 2017	Nîmes (2)	1–0	Marseille Consolat (3)	Nîmes
20:45 CET	Paquiez 90+3'	Report		Stadium: Stade des Costières; Attendance: 4,365; Referee: Sébastien Desiage

12 November 2017	AS Gémenos (5)	2–1 (a.e.t.)	FC Martigues (4)	Gémenos
15:00 CET	Hakkar 10' (pen.); Chevreuil 105+1' (pen.); Tarasconi (yellow card) 107' (yellow-red card)	Report	N'Koume-Kemba 39' (pen.)	Stadium: Stade Guy Delestrade; Attendance: 300; Referee: Mathieu Vernice

12 November 2017	SC Anduzien (7)	2–0	AS Sud Ardèche (7)	Anduze
14:00 CET	Grousset 2'; Ba 86' (pen.)	Report		Stadium: Stade de Langlas; Attendance: 800; Referee: Guillaume Janin

==== Group 7H ====
11 November 2017	AF Virois (6)	0–1	FC Chambly (3)	Vire
18:00 CET		Report	Pinteaux (yellow card) 53' (yellow-red card); Henry 80'	Stadium: Stade Pierre Compte; Attendance: 700; Referee: Nicolas Rodrigues

11 November 2017	ASPTT Caen (6)	0–1	Le Mans FC (4)	Caen
18:30 CET	Camillo (yellow card) 89' (yellow-red card)	Report	Dupont 31'	Stadium: Stade Maurice Fouque; Attendance: 400; Referee: Romain Zamo

12 November 2017	Évreux FC 27 (5)	3–2	Le Havre (2)	Ménilles
14:00 CET	Laura 34'; Petitjean 47'; Benmansour 81'	Report	Fontaine 29'; Mateta 62' (pen.)	Stadium: Stade Pacy-Ménilles; Attendance: 1,500; Referee: Antoine Grare

12 November 2017	US Granville (4)	3–2	Vierzon FC (5)	Granville
14:00 CET	Douniama 37', 56'; Gace 49'	Report	Dinet 39', 45'	Stadium: Stade Louis Dior; Attendance: 843; Referee: Steeve Gérard Dubec

12 November 2017	FC Chartres (4)	3–1	Orléans (2)	Chartres
15:00 CET	Franchi 4'; Delonglée 34'; Gazeau 59'	Report	Cissokho 71'	Stadium: Stade Jacques-Couvret; Attendance: 1,400; Referee: Jeremie Pignard

12 November 2017	AC Houilles (8)	1–0	LC Bretteville-sur-Odon (6)	Houilles
14:00 CET	Tailly 28'	Report		Stadium: Stade Maurice Baquet; Attendance: 916; Referee: Matthieu Le Bris

18 November 2017	St Brice FC (6)	1–4	FC Rouen (5)	Saint-Brice-sous-Forêt
14:00 CET	Mebarki 87'	Report	Prieur 61'; Sidibé 69', 90+1'; Aït Saïd 90'	Stadium: Stade Léon Graffin; Attendance: 500; Referee: Quentin Meresse

==== Group 7I ====
19 November 2017	USM Senlisienne (5)	2–1	US Vimy (6)	Senlis
14:00 CET	Mafouta 65', 80'	Report	Coppin 8'; Zunino (yellow card) 43' (yellow-red card)	Stadium: Complexe Sportif; Attendance: 360; Referee: Vincent Dubourdieu

12 November 2017	US Rungis (6)	2–0	FC Porto Portugais Amiens (7)	Rungis
14:30 CET	Koita 16', 30'	Report		Stadium: Stade Lucien Grelinger; Attendance: 1,000; Referee: Raphaël Roumy

11 November 2017	Arras FA (4)	3–2 (a.e.t.)	GC Lucciana (5)	Arras
19:00 CET	Boumahammed 33'; Diaby 96'; Steppé 117' (pen.)	Report	Genga 24'; Nouala (yellow card) 77' (yellow-red card); Texeira Lopes 93' (pen.)	Stadium: Stade Degouve Brabant; Attendance: 384; Referee: Willy Bertolotti

10 November 2017	US Nœux-les-Mines (7)	0–5	Lens (2)	Lens
18:30 CET		Report	Lendrić 6', 22', 37'; Ephestion 59'; Gomel 86'	Stadium: Stade Bollaert-Delelis; Attendance: 11,849; Referee: Guillaume Paradis

11 November 2017	SC Hazebrouck (6)	2–1	Quevilly-Rouen (2)	Hazebrouck
17:00 CET	Camara 43'; Poix 82'	Report	Gakpa 7'	Stadium: Stade Auguste Demette; Attendance: 2,200; Referee: Sébastien Moreira

12 November 2017	US Chantilly (6)	0–3	Racing Colombes 92 (5)	Vineuil-Saint-Firmin
14:00 CET		Report	Douala 35'; Schuhmann 40'; Fendoung 75'	Stadium: Stade des Bourgognes; Attendance: 189; Referee: Mirhane Abdallah

12 November 2017	Olympique Marcquois (6)	1–2	FC Fleury 91 (4)	Marcq-en-Barœul
14:00 CET	Pecqueur 57'	Report	Fofana 10'; Danso 59'	Stadium: Stade Georges Niquet; Attendance: 650; Referee: Gaétan Korbas

12 November 2017	CO Les Ulis (5)	0–1	US Boulogne (3)	Les Ulis
14:00 CET	Coulibaly (yellow card) 68' (yellow-red card)	Report	El Hamzaoui 6'; Agelier (yellow card) 54' (red card)	Stadium: Stade Jean-Marc Salinier; Referee: Philippe Lucas

==== Group 7J ====
11 November 2017	FCA Troyes (6)	0–2	Valenciennes (2)	Saint-André-les-Vergers
14:00 CET		Report	Guezoui 45+1'; Diarra 52'	Stadium: Complexe Sportif Jean Bianchi; Attendance: 800; Referee: Mickaël Leleu

12 November 2017	OS Fives (7)	1–1 (a.e.t.) (5–4 p)	Entente Itancourt-Neuville (6)	Lille
14:00 CET	Nsompani 42'	Report	De Freitas 10'	Stadium: Stade Marcel Duhoo; Attendance: 400; Referee: Florent Marmion

12 November 2017	Saint-Amand FC (5)	1–3	Ajaccio (2)	Saint-Amand-les-Eaux
14:00 CET	Lamonnier 37'	Report	Marin 2'; Wissa 15', 74'	Stadium: Stade Municipal; Attendance: 1,394; Referee: Romain Lissorgue

11 November 2017	AC Cambrai (6)	0–1	USL Dunkerque (3)	Cambrai
18:30 CET		Report	Verplanck (red card) 15'; Muraglia 38'	Stadium: Stade de la Liberté; Attendance: 763; Referee: Emmanuel Caron

12 November 2017	US Lusitanos Saint-Maur (4)	0–2	FCM Aubervilliers (5)	Le Plessis-Trévise
15:00 CET		Report	Tavares 80'; Djoco 85'	Stadium: Complexe Sportif Louison Bobet; Attendance: 150; Referee: Valentin Ougier

12 November 2017	AFC Compiègne (6)	0–1	AS Furiani-Agliani (4)	Compiegne
14:30 CET		Report	Pastorelli 71'; Pahama (red card) 90'	Stadium: Stade Paul Cosyns; Attendance: 311; Referee: Yann Gazagnes

12 November 2017	ASC La Courneuve (10)	0–2	Blanc Mesnil SF (5)	Aubervilliers
15:30 CET		Report	Tshimanga 87'; Benghadifa 89'	Stadium: Stade André Karman; Attendance: 1,500; Referee: Alexandre Decoster

12 November 2017	FC Quarouble (9)	0–1	US Choisy-au-Bac (6)	Crespin
14:00 CET		Report	Poiret 36' (pen.)	Stadium: Stade Edmond Romby; Attendance: 750; Referee: Clément Fabry

== Eighth round ==
The draw for the eighth round took place on 14 November 2017. Because AS Excelsior (R1) (Réunion) won their seventh round tie in mainland France, they are guaranteed a home tie in the eighth round, against one of the opponents from the French League structure who applied to potentially travel overseas.

Games were played on 1, 2, 3, 9 and 10 December 2017.

=== Overseas draw ===
3 December 2017	AS Excelsior (R1) (Réunion)	2–3	Le Mans FC (4)	Saint-Paul, Réunion
15:15 RET	Doumbia 50' (o.g.); El Madaghri 76'	Report	Hafidi 41'; Tangatchy 49'; Soro Nanga 66'	Stadium: Stade Paul Julius Bénard; Attendance: 2,000; Referee: Mirhane Abdallah

=== Main draw ===
The main draw was split into 6 groups, with the split primarily ensuring an equal distribution of clubs from the different tiers, and secondarily grouping by geography.

==== Group 8A ====
2 December 2017	US Colomiers Football (4)	3–0	AS Furiani-Agliani (4)	Colomiers
18:00 CET	Ventrice 18'; Fichten 64'; Cardinali (yellow card) 64' (yellow-red card); Barthié Fortassin (red card) 64'; Aglar 90'	Report	Moretti (yellow card) 64' (yellow-red card)	Stadium: Complexe Sportif Capitany; Attendance: 250; Referee: Ahmed Taleb

9 December 2017	AS Gémenos (5)	1–2	Gazélec Ajaccio (2)	Carnoux-en-Provence
15:00 CET	Sidi 88'	Report	Kemen 24'; Le Goff 68' (o.g.)	Stadium: Stade Marcel Cerdan; Attendance: 559; Referee: Romain Delpech

2 December 2017	Canet Roussillon FC (5)	2–0	Ajaccio (2)	Canet-en-Roussillon
18:00 CET	Mahieu 58'; Ouadoudi 73' (pen.)	Report		Stadium: Stade Saint Michel; Attendance: 1,490; Referee: Willy Delajod

3 December 2017	FC Alberes Argelès (6)	0–2	Le Puy Foot 43 Auvergne (4)	Argelès-sur-Mer
13:30 CET		Report	N'Doye 10'; Traoré 25'	Stadium: Stade du Marasquer; Attendance: 750; Referee: Samir Zolota

2 December 2017	Grenoble Foot 38 (3)	3–0	Tarbes Pyrénées Football (4)	Grenoble
15:00 CET	Sotoca 42', 65'; Spano 78'	Report		Stadium: Stade des Alpes; Attendance: 1,355; Referee: Jules Telliez

3 December 2017	SC Anduzien (7)	1–3	Nîmes (2)	Alès
14:30 CET	Grousset 34'	Report	Vlachodimos 13'; Valls 24', 78'	Stadium: Stade Pierre Pibarot; Attendance: 4,000; Referee: Eric Wattellier

2 December 2017	AS Fabrègues (5)	1–1 (a.e.t.) (5–4 p)	Rodez AF (3)	Fabrègues
18:00 CET	Benlefki 90+3'	Report	Da Silva 9'; Mpasi-Nzau (yellow card) 85' (yellow-red card)	Stadium: Stade Joseph Jeanton; Attendance: 1,000; Referee: Dimitri Kristo

==== Group 8B ====
2 December 2017	US Concarneau (3)	3–2 (a.e.t.)	Brest (2)	Concarneau
15:00 CET	Richetin 80'; Idazza 84', 92'	Report	H. Diallo 14'; Berthomier 43'	Stadium: Stade Guy Piriou; Attendance: 3,953; Referee: Aurélien Petit

2 December 2017	Séné FC (8)	1–6	Lorient (2)	Vannes
18:00 CET	Delesne 33'	Report	Marveaux 5'; Danic 14', 89'; Bouanga 38', 42'; Majeed Waris 84'	Stadium: Stade de la Rabine; Attendance: 6,548; Referee: Jeremy Stinat

3 December 2017	Olympique Saumur FC (6)	0–0 (a.e.t.) (5–6 p)	Vannes OC (5)	Saumur
14:30 CET		Report		Stadium: Stade des Rives du Thouet; Attendance: 900; Referee: Renaud Potier

2 December 2017	US Granville (4)	2–1	AS Vitré (4)	Granville
18:00 CET	T. Théault 18'; Douniama 63'	Report	Maïga 84'	Stadium: Stade Louis Dior; Attendance: 1,041; Referee: Alexandre Decoster

2 December 2017	FC Saint-Lô Manche (5)	1–1 (a.e.t.) (3–1 p)	US Changé (5)	Saint-Lô
18:30 CET	Guenerie 10'	Report	Laribi 2'	Stadium: Stade Louis Villemer; Attendance: 1,000; Referee: Alexis Brouard

2 December 2017	Stade Briochin (4)	2–0	Stade Lavallois (3)	Saint-Brieuc
18:00 CET	Martin 59', 69'	Report		Stadium: Fred-Aubert Stadium; Attendance: 2,500; Referee: Yann Flament

2 December 2017	FC Essartais (7)	0–3 (a.e.t.)	US Saint-Malo (4)	Le Poiré-sur-Vie
18:30 CET		Report	Bisson 97'; Vermet 115'; Lahaye 120' (pen.)	Stadium: Stade de l'Idonnière; Attendance: 2,000; Referee: Grégoire Valleteau

==== Group 8C ====
2 December 2017	Arras FA (4)	1–2	US Boulogne (3)	Arras
19:00 CET	Razak 65'	Report	Thil 75'; Livolant 78'	Stadium: Stade Degouve Brabant; Attendance: 1,000; Referee: Romain Zamo

3 December 2017	OS Fives (7)	0–2	USL Dunkerque (3)	Lille
13:30 CET		Report	Fachan 25'; Touré 76'	Stadium: Complexe Sportif Arthur Cornette; Attendance: 600; Referee: Damien Rossini

3 December 2017	Lens (2)	3–2 (a.e.t.)	Reims (2)	Lens
13:45 CET	Zoubir 32'; Cristian López 101', 115' (pen.)	Report	Ndom 68'; Oudin 110'	Stadium: Stade Bollaert-Delelis; Attendance: 11,542; Referee: Johan Hamel

2 December 2017	Évreux FC 27 (5)	0–3	Valenciennes (2)	Évreux
14:00 CET		Report	Diarra 42'; Mauricio 45+1'; Ambri 68'	Stadium: Stade du 14 Juillet; Attendance: 1,400; Referee: Philippe Lucas

3 December 2017	USM Senlisienne (5)	3–1	US Choisy-au-Bac (6)	Senlis
15:00 CET	Damour 11'; Neto 16'; El Farissi 64'	Report	Plé 32'	Stadium: Complexe Sportif N°1; Attendance: 800; Referee: Matthieu Bonnetin

2 December 2017	FC Rouen (5)	0–2	FC Chartres (4)	Le Petit-Quevilly
18:00 CET		Report	Marie-Louise 44'; Papin 90+1'	Stadium: Stade Robert Diochon; Attendance: 2,300; Referee: Aurélien Grizon

2 December 2017	SC Hazebrouck (6)	3–0	AS Beauvais Oise (4)	Hazebrouck
19:00 CET	Desruelle 5', 62'; Camara 71'	Report		Stadium: Stade Auguste Damette; Attendance: 2,200; Referee: William Toulliou

2 December 2017	AC Houilles (8)	2–1	(French Guiana) ASE Matoury (R1)	Houilles
13:30 CET	Bollaert 54'; Ntolla 62'	Report	Haabo 72' (pen.)	Stadium: Stade Maurice Baquet; Attendance: 1,400; Referee: Maxime Apruzzese

==== Group 8D ====
2 December 2017	L'Entente SSG (3)	3–2	Paris FC (2)	Sannois
18:00 CET	Sea 24'; Dia 71' (pen.); Dieye 88'	Report	Nomenjanahary 17'; Yohou (red card) 26'; Lybohy 87'	Stadium: Parc Des Sports Michel Hidalgo; Attendance: 1,500; Referee: Sébastien Moreira

3 December 2017	FCSR Haguenau (5)	1–3	FC Chambly (3)	Haguenau
15:00 CET	Giesi 67'	Report	Montiel 46'; L. Doucouré 85', 90+5'; Odzoumo (yellow card) 90+4' (yellow-red card)	Stadium: Parc Des Sports; Attendance: 500; Referee: Yohan Gagnant

3 December 2017	SC Schiltigheim (4)	2–1	Racing Colombes 92 (5)	Schiltigheim
15:00 CET	Nellec 19'; Saline 21'	Report	Gabriel 64'	Stadium: Stade de l'Aar; Attendance: 250; Referee: Marc Bollengier

10 December 2017	SAS Épinal (4)	2–1	Blanc Mesnil SF (5)	Épinal
14:30 CET	Haguy 7'; Segbé Azankpo 78'	Report	Mendy 40'	Stadium: Stade de la Colombière; Attendance: 215; Referee: Loic Mouton

2 December 2017	US Rungis (6)	1–6	Nancy (2)	Bonneuil-sur-Marne
13:30 CET	Dansoko 67'	Report	Barka 19', 37', 50'; Robic 29'; Busin 31'; Eler 59'	Stadium: Stade Léo Lagrange; Attendance: 1,000; Referee: Emmanuel Caron

2 December 2017	FC Fleury 91 (4)	4–0	US Raon-l'Étape (4)	Bondoufle
18:00 CET	Rother 11' (o.g.); Slijepcevic 30'; Fofana 61'; Koné 68'	Report		Stadium: Stade Robert Bobin; Attendance: 200; Referee: Jordan Riche

3 December 2017	UL Rombas (8)	1–2 (a.e.t.)	FC Still 1930 (8)	Rombas
13:30 CET	Yagmur (red card) 15'; Fortés 41'	Report	Maisonneuve 6' (pen.); Derhan 94'	Stadium: Stade du Fond Saint Martin; Attendance: 800; Referee: Willy Bertolotti

==== Group 8E ====
2 December 2017	FC Gueugnon (5)	1–1 (a.e.t.) (0–2 p)	Angoulême CFC (5)	Gueugnon
18:00 CET	Harrison 109'	Report	Franco (yellow card) 61' (yellow-red card); Nomel 102'	Stadium: Stade Jean Laville; Attendance: 800; Referee: Edgar Barenton

3 December 2017	La Brède FC (6)	0–1 (a.e.t.)	FCM Aubervilliers (5)	La Brède
14:00 CET		Report	Soudant 110'	Stadium: Stade André Mabille; Attendance: 1,000; Referee: Cédric Mouysset

2 December 2017	Châteauroux (2)	5–3	SO Cholet (3)	Châteauroux
16:00 CET	Barthelmé 13' (pen.); Mandanne 43', 57', 71'; Mabella 90+2'	Report	Gómez 17'; Keïta 45'; Gbelle 77'	Stadium: Stade Gaston Petit; Attendance: 878; Referee: William Lavis

2 December 2017	Stade Bordelais (4)	0–1	Niort (2)	Le Bouscat
18:00 CET		Report	Ndoh 39'	Stadium: Stade Sainte Germaine; Attendance: 2,000; Referee: Julien Schmitt

2 December 2017	Sud Nivernais Imphy Decize (6)	3–0	Bergerac Périgord FC (4)	Decize
18:00 CET	Ouled 18', 77'; Meindu 90+1'	Report		Stadium: Stade Des Halles; Attendance: 1,000; Referee: Yazid El Mrabet

2 December 2017	Limoges FC (4)	2–4	Tours (2)	Limoges
18:00 CET	Belfoul 5' (pen.), 33' (pen.)	Report	Miguel 7', 87'; Tall 70', 78' (pen.)	Stadium: Stade Saint Lazare; Attendance: 1,000; Referee: Stéphanie Frappart

1 December 2017	Les Herbiers VF (3)	2–1	SO Romorantin (4)	Les Herbiers
20:00 CET	Bongongui 84'; Rocheteau 90+5'	Report	Touré 69'	Stadium: Parc Des Sports Massabielle; Attendance: 994; Referee: Nicolas Rodrigues

==== Group 8F ====
2 December 2017	ASF Andrézieux (4)	1–2 (a.e.t.)	Auxerre (2)	Andrézieux-Bouthéon
18:00 CET	Spano 16'	Report	Sané 15'; Sangaré 115'	Stadium: Envol Stadium; Attendance: 3,157; Referee: Sofien Benchabane

1 December 2017	ASC Biesheim (5)	1–0 (a.e.t.)	AS Lyon-Duchère (3)	Biesheim
19:30 CET	Bischoff 107'	Report		Stadium: Stade Municipal; Attendance: 373; Referee: Joachim Caffe Pierson

2 December 2017	ES Tarentaise (7)	1–2	Bourg-en-Bresse (2)	Moûtiers
16:00 CET	Boukhiba 61' (pen.)	Report	Faivre 26'; Boussaha 43'	Stadium: Stade Joseph Bardassier; Attendance: 2,200; Referee: Guillaume Janin

2 December 2017	CO Avallon (5)	1–0 (a.e.t.)	Cluses-Scionzier FC (6)	Avallon
13:30 CET	Gauchot 99'	Report		Stadium: Stade Léon Laurent; Attendance: 600; Referee: Anthony Ustaritz

2 December 2017	AS Yzeure (4)	3–0	ASM Belfort (4)	Yzeure
18:00 CET	Seck 51'; Millot 68'; Diot 90'	Report		Stadium: Stade de Bellevue; Attendance: 500; Referee: Abdelkarim Bouzalmat

2 December 2017	FC Saint-Louis Neuweg (4)	1–1 (a.e.t.) (4–5 p)	Sochaux (2)	Saint-Louis
17:00 CET	Sengele 26'	Report	Teikeu 80'	Stadium: Stade de la Frontière; Attendance: 1,000; Referee: Emmanuel Esneu

2 December 2017	FC Morteau-Montlebon (6)	1–2	CA Pontarlier (5)	Montlebon
15:30 CET	Tebourbi 17'	Report	Carlos Miranda 30' (pen.), 58'	Stadium: Stade Henri Schaller; Attendance: 2,000; Referee: Brendan Roffet

== Round of 64 ==
The draw for the ninth round (known as the round of 64) took place on 14 December 2017. The 20 Ligue 1 teams join the draw at this stage. The draw is split into four groups to ensure equal distribution of teams from each tier, with geographical proximity a secondary factor.

The lowest ranked teams remaining in the competition at this stage were AC Houilles and FC Still 1930, both from tier 8 (Regional 3). FC Still 1930 entered the competition at the first round, and are the longest standing team still in the competition.

Games were played on 6, 7 and 8 January 2018.

=== Group 9A ===
7 January 2018	Sochaux (2)	6–0	Amiens (1)	Montbéliard
17:30 CET	Ruiz 24'; Méïte 30'; Kalulu 36'; Robinet 60'; Berenguer 82'; Daham 89'	Report		Stadium: Stade Auguste Bonal; Attendance: 5,392; Referee: Johan Hamel

7 January 2018	FC Still 1930 (8)	0–1	Troyes (1)	Molsheim
17:30 CET		Report	Nivet 80'	Stadium: Parc des Sports; Attendance: 2,300; Referee: Niel Alexandre Perreau

6 January 2018	CO Avallon (5)	0–2	FC Chambly (3)	Auxerre
13:30 CET		Report	Hilaire 13'; Montiel 53'	Stadium: Stade de l'Abbé-Deschamps; Attendance: 1,200; Referee: Sylvain Palhies

6 January 2018	SC Schiltigheim (4)	1–5	Auxerre (2)	Schiltigheim
15:00 CET	Arcus 90' (o.g.)	Report	Barreto 52'; Philippoteaux 60', 78'; Tacalfred 70'; Sangaré 89'	Stadium: Stade de l'Aar; Attendance: 1,022; Referee: Willy Delajod

7 January 2018	Strasbourg (1)	3–2 (a.e.t.)	Dijon (1)	Strasbourg
14:15 CET	Gonçalves 59'; Blayac 92'; Nuno Jóia 93'	Report	Djilobodji 65'; Tavares 103'	Stadium: Stade de la Meinau; Attendance: 12,269; Referee: Benoît Millot

6 January 2018	Nancy (2)	2–3	Lyon (1)	Nancy
21:00 CET	Robic 71' (pen.); Nordin 75'	Report	Fekir 25'; Marcelo 87'; Cornet 90+4'	Stadium: Stade Marcel Picot; Attendance: 14,201; Referee: Antony Gautier

7 January 2018	FC Fleury 91 (4)	0–1	ASC Biesheim (5)	Bondoufle
17:30 CET		Report	Efondja 60'	Stadium: Stade Robert Bobin; Attendance: 1,000; Referee: Yohann Rouinsard

7 January 2018	L'Entente SSG (3)	1–2	SAS Épinal (4)	Sannois
17:30 CET	Dramé 81' (pen.)	Report	Konté 15'; Segbé Azankpo 90'	Stadium: Parc des Sports Michel Hidalgo; Attendance: 2,000; Referee: Guillaume Paradis

=== Group 9B ===
6 January 2018	Canet Roussillon FC (5)	3–1	Sud Nivernais Imphy Decize (6)	Canet-en-Roussillon
18:00 CET	Barbier 9'; Posteraro 31'; Mahieu 60'	Report	Milie 90'	Stadium: Stade Saint Michel; Attendance: 2,300; Referee: Alexandre Castro

6 January 2018	CA Pontarlier (5)	1–1 (a.e.t.) (2–4 p)	Montpellier (1)	Pontarlier
15:00 CET	Carlos Miranda 59'	Report	Congré 39'; Mendes (red card) 74'	Stadium: Stade Paul Robbe; Attendance: 2,980; Referee: Frank Schneider

6 January 2018	AS Fabrègues (5)	1–2 (a.e.t.)	Bourg-en-Bresse (2)	Fabrègues
13:30 CET	Kassa 99' (pen.)	Report	Heinry 92'; Martins 105'	Stadium: Stade Joseph Jeanton; Attendance: 2,000; Referee: William Lavis

6 January 2018	Toulouse (1)	1–0	Nice (1)	Toulouse
14:15 CET	Somália 51'	Report		Stadium: Stadium de Toulouse; Attendance: 8,318; Referee: Jérôme Brisard

6 January 2018	AS Yzeure (4)	2–5	Monaco (1)	Moulins
18:00 CET	Seck 28' (pen.); Hardouin 44'	Report	Carrillo 1', 49', 84'; Jovetić 39'; Fabinho 54' (pen.)	Stadium: Stade Hector Rolland; Attendance: 3,500; Referee: Aurelien Petit

6 January 2018	US Colomiers Football (4)	1–1 (a.e.t.) (4–2 p)	Le Puy Foot 43 Auvergne (4)	Colomiers
18:00 CET	Cardinali 63' (pen.)	Report	do Pilar Patrao 72'	Stadium: Complexe Sportif Capitany; Attendance: 1,200; Referee: Florent Batta

6 January 2018	Gazélec Ajaccio (2)	1–2	Grenoble Foot 38 (3)	Ajaccio
15:00 CET	Touré 53' (pen.)	Report	Elogo 66'; Bénet 84'	Stadium: Stade Ange Casanova; Attendance: 1,500; Referee: Karim Abed

7 January 2018	Saint-Étienne (1)	2–0	Nîmes (2)	Saint-Étienne
14:15 CET	Berić 63'; Bamba 68'	Report	Boscagli (red card) 12'	Stadium: Stade Geoffroy-Guichard; Attendance: 13,148; Referee: Thual Olivier

=== Group 9C ===
6 January 2018	Le Mans FC (4)	2–4	Lille (1)	Le Mans
15:00 CET	Schur 23'; Créhin 29' (pen.)	Report	Ponce 8'; Pépé 12'; Thiago Maia 34'; Mendes 90+6'	Stadium: MMArena; Attendance: 20,000; Referee: Jeremy Stinat

6 January 2018	FC Chartres (4)	1–2	Tours (2)	Chartres
15:00 CET	Delonglée 27' (red card) 90+7'; Barthomeuf (red card) 48'	Report	Tall 9', 42'; El Hriti (red card) 55'	Stadium: Stade Jacques Couvret; Attendance: 2,400; Referee: Romain Delpech

7 January 2018	USM Senlisienne (5)	0–4	Nantes (1)	Beauvais
17:30 CET		Report	Bammou 28'; Rongier 36'; Sala 81', 90'	Stadium: Stade Pierre Brisson; Attendance: 5,000; Referee: Bastien Dechepy

7 January 2018	Marseille (1)	1–0 (a.e.t.)	Valenciennes (2)	Marseille
14:15 CET	Amavi 103'	Report		Stadium: Orange Vélodrome; Attendance: 25,128; Referee: Mikael Lesage

6 January 2018	FC Saint-Lô Manche (5)	2–2 (a.e.t.) (3–2 p)	FCM Aubervilliers (5)	Saint-Lô
15:00 CET	Coulibaly 60' (pen.); Vauvy 98'	Report	Soudant 89'; Djoco 105'	Stadium: Stade Louis Villemer; Attendance: 2,500; Referee: Mehdi Mokhtari

7 January 2018	USL Dunkerque (3)	2–4	Metz (1)	Dunkirk
17:30 CET	M. Fachan 71'; D. Fachan 82'	Report	Niane 44', 80'; Rivière 52'; Cafú 75'	Stadium: Stade Tribute; Attendance: 3,000; Referee: Stephane Jochem

8 January 2018	Lens (2)	3–2 (a.e.t.)	US Boulogne (3)	Lens
21:00 CET	Cristian López 60' (pen.), 100'; Diarra 63'	Report	Koné 22', 90'	Stadium: Stade Bollaert-Delelis; Attendance: 12,293; Referee: Sebastien Moreira

6 January 2018	SC Hazebrouck (6)	0–2	Caen (1)	Hazebrouck
18:00 CET		Report	Rodelin 27'; Armougom 82'	Stadium: Stade Auguste Damette; Attendance: 3,000; Referee: Stéphanie Frappart

=== Group 9D ===
6 January 2018	AC Houilles (8)	0–3	US Concarneau (3)	Houilles
15:00 CET		Report	Donisa 9'; Idazza 12', 84'	Stadium: Stade Maurice Baquet; Attendance: 1,800; Referee: Cedric Dos Santos

7 January 2018	Rennes (1)	1–6	Paris Saint-Germain (1)	Rennes
21:00 CET	Bourigeaud 66' (pen.)	Report	Mbappé 9', 74'; Neymar 17', 43'; Di María 24', 76'	Stadium: Roazhon Park; Attendance: 19,777; Referee: Amaury Delerue

6 January 2018	US Saint-Malo (4)	1–2	Châteauroux (2)	Saint-Malo
15:00 CET	Feqrache 87'	Report	Tounkara 78'; Benrahma 85'	Stadium: Stade de Marville; Attendance: 2,204; Referee: Tony Chapron

7 January 2018	US Granville (4)	2–1 (a.e.t.)	Bordeaux (1)	Granville
14:15 CET	Martinet 90+4'; Dounima 103' (pen.)	Report	Sankharé 37'; Sabaly (yellow card) 85' (yellow-red card); Carrique (yellow card) 102' (yellow-red card); Plašil (red card) 110'	Stadium: Stade Louis Dior; Attendance: 3,000; Referee: Leonard Thomas

7 January 2018	Vannes OC (5)	1–1 (a.e.t.) (3–5 p)	Stade Briochin (4)	Vannes
17:30 CET	Dufrennes 113' (pen.)	Report	Rouxel 107'	Stadium: Stade de la Rabine; Attendance: 3,200; Referee: Jordan Riche

7 January 2018	Angers (1)	0–2	Lorient (2)	Angers
14:15 CET		Report	Pavlović 29' (o.g.); Bouanga 41'	Stadium: Stade Raymond Kopa; Attendance: 8,783; Referee: Nicolas Rainville

6 January 2018	Guingamp (1)	1–0	Niort (2)	Guingamp
18:00 CET	Coco 36'	Report		Stadium: Stade de Roudourou; Attendance: 8,318; Referee: Clement Turpin

6 January 2018	Angoulême CFC (5)	1–2 (a.e.t.)	Les Herbiers VF (3)	Angoulême
18:00 CET	Dorangeon 90'	Report	Bongongui 86'; Koutob 115'	Stadium: Stade Lebon; Attendance: 2,450; Referee: Sofien Benchabane

== Round of 32 ==
The draw for the tenth round (known as the round of 32) took place on 8 January 2018. This was an open draw.

The lowest ranked teams remaining in the competition at this stage were Canet Roussillon FC, FC Saint-Lô Manche and ASC Biesheim, all from tier 5 (Championnat National 3).

Games were played on 23, 24 and 25 January 2018.

23 January 2018	Châteauroux (2)	1–1 (a.e.t.) (3–4 p)	FC Chambly (3)	Châteauroux
18:30 CET	Mandanne 60'	Report	Doucouré 71'	Stadium: Stade Gaston Petit; Attendance: 1,843; Referee: Thomas Léonard

23 January 2018	Nantes (1)	3–4	Auxerre (2)	Nantes
18:30 CET	Thomasson 38', 65'; Dubois 51'; Lucas Lima (red card) 70'	Report	Konaté 6'; Pallois 32' (o.g.); Ayé 34'; Sangaré 76'	Stadium: Stade de la Beaujoire; Attendance: 13,618; Referee: Amaury Delerue

23 January 2018	Stade Briochin (4)	0–1	Lens (2)	Saint-Brieuc
18:30 CET		Report	Cristian López 14' (pen.)	Stadium: Fred-Aubert Stadium; Attendance: 6,858; Referee: Aurélien Petit

24 January 2018	Montpellier (1)	4–3	Lorient (2)	Montpellier
18:30 CET	Ninga 10', 64'; Sambia 55'; Mbenza 60'	Report	Bouanga 7', 32'; Claude-Maurice 62'	Stadium: Stade de la Mosson; Attendance: 3,841; Referee: Benoît Millot

25 January 2018	Strasbourg (1)	2–1	Lille (1)	Strasbourg
21:05 CET	Da Costa 31'; Saadi 48'	Report	Bissouma 54'	Stadium: Stade de la Meinau; Referee: Clément Turpin

24 January 2018	ASC Biesheim (5)	2–2 (a.e.t.) (0–3 p)	Grenoble Foot 38 (3)	Biesheim
18:30 CET	Jacquat 45'; Dardouri 92'	Report	Boussaha 54'; Bénet 117'	Stadium: Stade Municipal; Attendance: 1,920; Referee: Florent Batta

24 January 2018	Troyes (1)	1–1 (a.e.t.) (4–3 p)	Saint-Étienne (1)	Troyes
18:30 CET	Nivet 24' (pen.)	Report	Maïga 48'	Stadium: Stade de l'Aube; Attendance: 3,921; Referee: Karim Abed

24 January 2018	FC Saint-Lô Manche (5)	1–2	Les Herbiers VF (3)	Saint-Lô
18:30 CET	Montout 72'	Report	Bongongui 54', 71'	Stadium: Stade Louis Villemer; Attendance: 2,617; Referee: Willy Delajod

23 January 2018	Bourg-en-Bresse (2)	2–0	Toulouse (1)	Bourg-en-Bresse
18:30 CET	Court 63'; Bègue 89'	Report	Julien (red card) 61'	Stadium: Stade Marcel-Verchère; Attendance: 3,490; Referee: Sébastien Moreira

24 January 2018	Paris Saint-Germain (1)	4–2	Guingamp (1)	Paris
18:30 CET	Rabiot 21'; Deaux 25' (o.g.); Pastore 64'; Marquinhos 89'	Report	Thuram 33' (pen.); Ngbakoto 75' (pen.)	Stadium: Parc des Princes; Attendance: 47,322; Referee: Antony Gautier

23 January 2018	Canet Roussillon FC (5)	1–1 (a.e.t.) (3–4 p)	Caen (1)	Canet-en-Roussillon
18:30 CET	Mahieu 13'	Report	Genevois 29'	Stadium: Stade Saint-Michel; Attendance: 2,888; Referee: Olivier Thual

24 January 2018	Monaco (1)	2–3	Lyon (1)	Monaco
21:05 CET	Jovetić 13'; Lopes 71'	Report	Traoré 21'; Mariano 25', 55'	Stadium: Stade Louis II; Attendance: 7,143; Referee: Ruddy Buquet

23 January 2018	US Granville (4)	3–2 (a.e.t.)	US Concarneau (3)	Granville
18:30 CET	Theault 25'; Blondel 100', 116'	Report	Jannez 9'; Donisa 98'	Stadium: Stade Louis Dior; Attendance: 3,056; Referee: Stéphane Jochem

24 January 2018	Tours (2)	0–0 (a.e.t.) (1–2 p)	Metz (1)	Tours
18:30 CET		Report		Stadium: Stade de la Vallée du Cher; Attendance: 4,610; Referee: Frank Schneider

23 January 2018	US Colomiers Football (4)	1–2	Sochaux (2)	Colomiers
18:30 CET	Coffi 89'	Report	Pendant 12'; Méïte 59'	Stadium: Stade Bertrand Andrieux; Attendance: 1,399; Referee: Alexandre Castro

23 January 2018	SAS Épinal (4)	0–2	Marseille (1)	Épinal
21:00 CET		Report	Germain 73'; Sanson 90+3'	Stadium: Stade de la Colombière; Attendance: 6,912; Referee: Johan Hamel

== Round of 16 ==
The draw for the eleventh round (known as the round of 16) took place on 25 January 2018. This was an open draw.

The lowest ranked team remaining in the competition at this stage was US Granville, from tier 4 (Championnat National 2).

Games were played on 6, 7 and 8 February 2018.

7 February 2018	Metz (1)	2–2 (a.e.t.) (2–3 p)	Caen (1)	Metz
18:30 CET	Niane 85'; Roux 108'	Report	Stavitski 51'; Bazile (red card) 84'; Diomandé 114'	Stadium: Stade Saint-Symphorien; Attendance: 11,201; Referee: Amaury Delerue
	Penalties
	Cohade (penalty missed); Balliu (penalty scored); Roux (penalty missed); Poblete (penalty scored); Rivière (penalty missed); Boulaya (penalty missed)		(penalty missed) Crivelli; (penalty scored) Djiku; (penalty scored) Diomandé; (penalty missed) Féret; (penalty missed) Da Silva; (penalty scored) Guilbert

7 February 2018	Montpellier (1)	1–2	Lyon (1)	Montpellier
21:00 CET	Ikoné 22'	Report	Cornet 13'; Fekir 27' (pen.)	Stadium: Stade de la Mosson; Attendance: 7,000; Referee: Mikael Lesage

6 February 2018	Bourg-en-Bresse (2)	0–9	Marseille (1)	Bourg-en-Bresse
18:30 CET		Report	Luiz Gustavo 10'; Payet 13'; Ocampos 16', 48', 71'; Mitroglou 20', 40', 81'; N'Jie 89' (pen.)	Stadium: Stade Marcel-Verchère; Attendance: 6,552; Referee: François Letexier

6 February 2018	Sochaux (2)	1–4	Paris Saint-Germain (1)	Montbéliard
21:05 CET	Martin 12'	Report	Di María 1', 57', 61'; Cavani 26'; Trapp (red card) 90'	Stadium: Stade Auguste Bonal; Attendance: 20,000; Referee: Jérôme Brisard

7 February 2018	Lens (2)	1–0	Troyes (1)	Lens
18:30 CET	Cristian 70'	Report		Stadium: Stade Bollaert-Delelis; Attendance: 10,255; Referee: Karim Abed

7 February 2018	FC Chambly (3)	1–0	US Granville (4)	Chambly
18:30 CET	Doucouré 50'	Report		Stadium: Stade des Marais; Attendance: 4,266; Referee: Alexandre Castro

6 February 2018	Auxerre (2)	0–3	Les Herbiers VF (3)	Auxerre
18:30 CET		Report	Rocheteau 45+1' (pen.); Gboho 64'; Flochon 79'	Stadium: Stade de l'Abbé-Deschamps; Attendance: 6,233; Referee: Stéphanie Frappart

8 February 2018	Grenoble Foot 38 (3)	0–3	Strasbourg (1)	Grenoble
21:00 CET		Report	Bahoken 32'; Terrier 78'; Gonçalves 90+4'	Stadium: Stade des Alpes; Referee: Olivier Thual

== Quarter-finals ==
The draw for the quarter-finals took place on 8 February 2018. This was an open draw.

The lowest ranked teams remaining in the competition at this stage were FC Chambly and Les Herbiers VF, both from tier 3 (Championnat National).

Games were played on 27 and 28 February and 1 March 2018.

28 February 2018	FC Chambly (3)	1–0	Strasbourg (1)	Beauvais
18:30 CET	Doucouré 83'	Report		Stadium: Stade Pierre Brisson; Attendance: 4,732; Referee: Nicolas Rainville

28 February 2018	Paris Saint-Germain (1)	3–0	Marseille (1)	Paris
21:05 CET	Di María 45+1', 48'; Cavani 81'	Report		Stadium: Parc des Princes; Attendance: 45,000; Referee: Clément Turpin

27 February 2018	Les Herbiers VF (3)	0–0 (a.e.t.) (4–2 p)	Lens (2)	Nantes
21:00 CET		Report		Stadium: Stade de la Beaujoire; Attendance: 21,146; Referee: Mikael Lesage
	Penalties
	Marie (penalty scored); Rocheteau (penalty missed); Bonnet (penalty scored); David (penalty scored); Flochon (penalty scored)		(penalty scored) Cristian; (penalty scored) Gersbach; (penalty missed) Diarra; (penalty missed) Mesloub

1 March 2018	Caen (1)	1–0	Lyon (1)	Caen
21:00 CET	Diomandé 77'	Report		Stadium: Stade Michel d'Ornano; Attendance: 17,000; Referee: Antony Gautier

== Semi-finals ==
The draw for the semi-finals took place on 1 March 2018. This was an open draw.

The lowest ranked teams remaining in the competition at this stage were still FC Chambly and Les Herbiers VF, both from tier 3 (Championnat National).

Games were played on 17 and 18 April 2018.

17 April 2018	Les Herbiers VF (3)	2–0	FC Chambly (3)	Nantes
21:00 CEST	David 28'; Gboho 80'	Report		Stadium: Stade de la Beaujoire; Attendance: 34,653; Referee: Benoît Bastien

18 April 2018	Caen (1)	1–3	Paris Saint-Germain (1)	Caen
21:05 CEST	Diomandé 43', (red card) 90'	Report	Mbappé 25', 81'; Nkunku 90+5'	Stadium: Stade Michel d'Ornano; Attendance: 20,350; Referee: François Letexier

== Final ==
8 May 2018
21:05 CEST

Les Herbiers VF	0–2	Paris Saint-Germain
	Report	Lo Celso 26'; Cavani 74' (pen.)

Stade de France, Saint-Denis
Attendance: 73,772
Referee: Mikael Lesage
