= William Vouama =

Comorian footballer (born 1996)

Personal information
- Date of birth: 12 November 1996 (age 29)
- Place of birth: France
- Positions: Midfielder; winger

Team information
- Current team: FC Fleury 91

Senior career*
Years	Team	Apps	(Gls)
2013–2016	ES Viry-Châtillon	8	(0)
2016–2017	Amiens SC B	18	(0)
2018	Athlético Marseille		
2019–2020	Jura Dolois Football	16	(3)
2020–	FC Fleury 91	54	(11)

International career
2023–	Comoros	2	(0)
- * Club domestic league appearances and goals

William Vouama (born 12 November 1996) is a footballer who plays as a midfielder or winger for FC Fleury 91. Born in France, he is a Comoros international.

== Early life ==
Vouama started his career with French side ES Viry-Châtillon. He debuted for the club at the age of sixteen.

== Club career ==
In 2020, Vouama signed for the French side FC Fleury 91. He was regarded as one the best players in the league while playing for the club.

== International career ==
Vouama is a Comoros international. He was first called up to the Comoros national football team for 2023 Africa Cup of Nations qualification.

== Style of play ==
Vouama mainly operates as a midfielder or winger. He has been described as a "twirling winger who provokes a lot".

== Personal life ==
Vouama was born in 1996 in France. He is a native of Corbeil-Essonnes, France.
