= FC Fleury 91 =

FC Fleury 91 may refer to:

- FC Fleury 91 (men), the men's football team
- FC Fleury 91 (women), the women's football team
