= Tarasconi =

Tarasconi is a surname. Notable people with the surname include:

- Domingo Tarasconi (1903–1991), Argentine footballer
- Katia Tarasconi (born 1973), Italian politician
- Maxime Tarasconi (born 1990), French footballer

== See also ==
- Tarascon (disambiguation)
