= Gboho =

Gboho is a surname. Notable people with the surname include:

- Ambroise Gboho (born 1994), Ivorian footballer
- Yann Gboho (born 2001), Ivorian footballer
