= Souleymane Anne =

Mauritanian footballer (born 1997)

Personal information
- Date of birth: 5 December 1997 (age 28)
- Place of birth: Orléans, France
- Height: 1.89 m (6 ft 2 in)
- Position: Forward

Team information
- Current team: Fleury 91
- Number: 9

Senior career*
Years	Team	Apps	(Gls)
2015–2016	SMOC	28	(36)
2016–2017	Saran	33	(27)
2017–2018	Angoulême	18	(7)
2018–2019	Aurillac Arpajon	24	(19)
2019–2020	Guingamp B	20	(7)
2020–2021	Tondela	17	(1)
2021–2023	Virton	45	(18)
2023–2024	Deinze	27	(5)
2024–2026	Al Kharaitiyat	18	(10)
2026–	Fleury 91	9	(1)

International career^{‡}
2019–	Mauritania	15	(1)
- * Club domestic league appearances and goals ‡ National team caps and goals as of 10 August 2026

Souleymane Anne (born 5 December 1997) is a footballer who plays as a forward for Ligue 3 club Fleury 91. Born in France, he plays for the Mauritania national team.

== Club career ==
Anne began his early footballing career in the lower tiers of France, and was a prolific goalscorer at SMOC, Saran, Angoulême, and finally Aurillac Arpajon.

On 25 July 2023, Anne signed a two-year contract with Deinze.

== International career ==
Born in France, Anne is of Mauritanian descent. Anne made his professional debut for the Mauritania national football team in a friendly 3-1 loss to Ghana on 26 March 2019.

He played for the national team at the African Cup of Nations 2019, the first international tournament of the team
