= Enzo Bovis =

Malagasy footballer (born 1994)

Personal information
- Date of birth: 23 April 1994 (age 32)
- Place of birth: Longjumeau, France
- Height: 1.85 m (6 ft 1 in)
- Position: Right-back

Team information
- Current team: Fleury
- Number: 23

Youth career
- 1999–2013: Fleury

Senior career*
Years	Team	Apps	(Gls)
2013–2018	Fleury	24	(0)
2018–2019	Boulogne-Billancourt	8	(0)
2019–	Fleury	159	(1)

International career^{‡}
2022–	Madagascar	1	(0)
- * Club domestic league appearances and goals as of 23 June 2026 ‡ National team caps and goals as of 01:42, 3 October 2022 (UTC)

Enzo Bovis (born 23 April 1994) is a professional footballer who plays as a right-back for Ligue 3 club Fleury. Born in France, he plays for the Madagascar national team.

== Professional career ==
Bovis began playing football with Fleury at the age of 5 and worked his way up all their youth levels. He began his senior career with the club in 2013 in the Championnat National 3, and helped them earn promotion to the Championnat National 2 in his debut season. Except for a period in 2018 where he played with Boulogne-Billancourt, Bovis has spent his entire career with Fleury.

== International career ==
Bovis was first called up to the Madagascar national team for a set of friendlies in January 2021. He debuted in a 3–3 friendly tie with Congo on 24 September 2022.

== Personal life ==
Bovis was born in France to a French father, and a Malagasy mother born in Mahajanga. He holds dual French-Malagasy citizenship. His father and grandfather were both presidents of the club Fleury.
