= Morgan Jean-Pierre =

Guadeloupean footballer (born 1992)

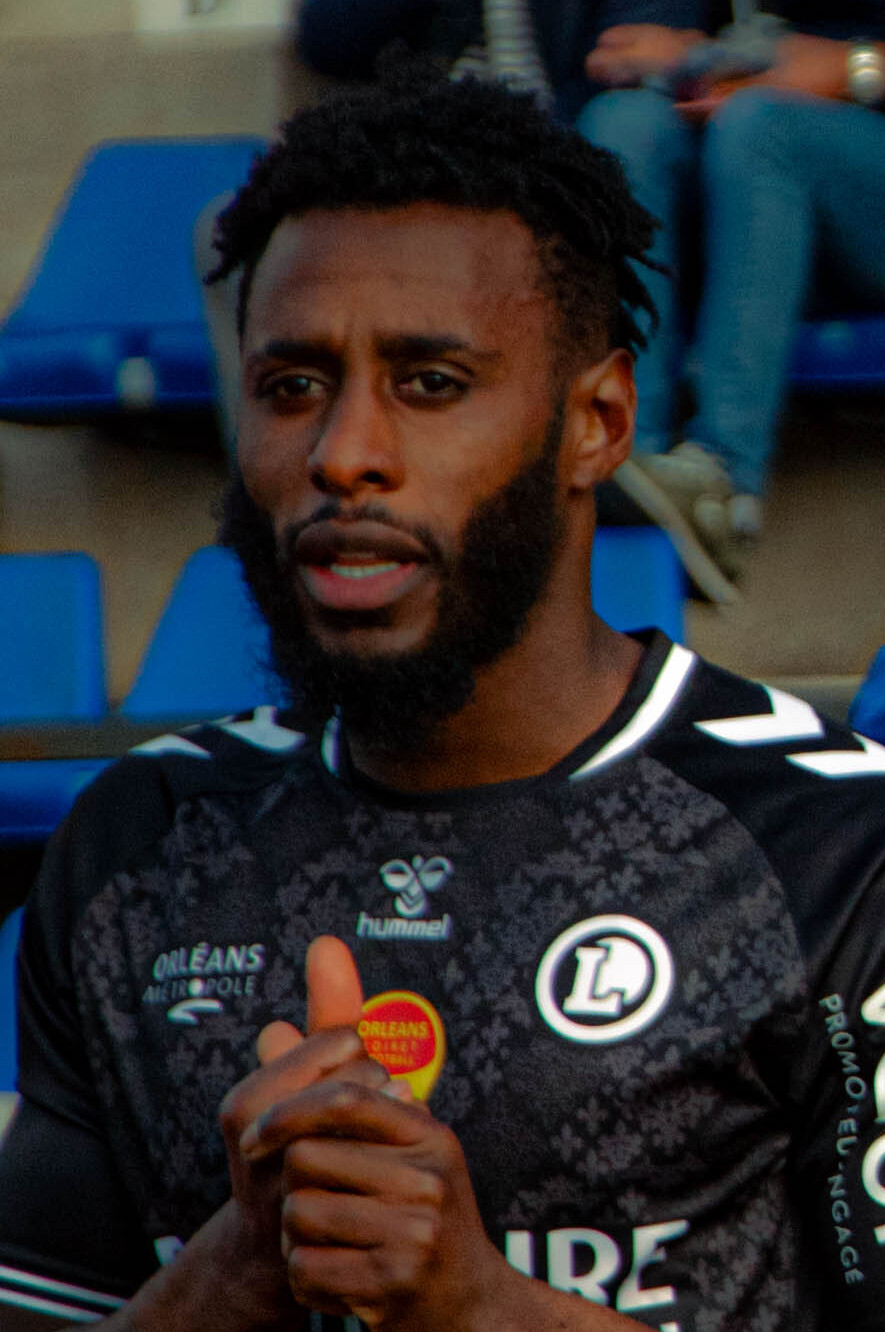
- Jean-Pierre in 2024

Personal information
- Date of birth: 30 October 1992 (age 34)
- Place of birth: Guadeloupe, France
- Height: 1.75 m (5 ft 9 in)
- Position: Defender

Team information
- Current team: Fleury
- Number: 25

Youth career
- Montpellier
- Rodez
- Sète

Senior career*
Years	Team	Apps	(Gls)
2011–2013	Agde	46	(0)
2013–2015	Béziers	40	(1)
2015	Honvéd	4	(0)
2015	Fabrègues	8	(0)
2016–2017	Košice	35	(2)
2017	Baník Ostrava	5	(0)
2018	Canet	8	(0)
2018–2020	Sète	45	(0)
2020–2021	Gazélec Ajaccio	9	(0)
2021–2023	Stade Briochin	56	(2)
2023–2025	Orléans	53	(0)
2025–	Fleury	18	(1)

International career^{‡}
2013	France Universiade	4	(0)
2022	Guadeloupe	6	(0)
2024–	Madagascar	9	(0)
- * Club domestic league appearances and goals as of 23 June 2026 ‡ National team caps and goals as of 17 November 2025

Morgan Jean-Pierre (born 30 October 1992) is a professional footballer who plays as a defender for Ligue 3 club Fleury. A former representative of France at the 2013 Summer Universiade, he then played for the Guadeloupe national team, before switching international allegiance to Madagascar in 2024.

== Club career ==
In 2011, Jean-Pierre signed for French fourth division side Agde, where he suffered relegation to the French fifth division. In 2015, Jean-Pierre signed for Honvéd in the Hungarian top flight, where he made five appearances and scored one goal. On 14 March 2015, he debuted for Honvéd during a 1–1 draw with Puskás Akadémia. On 27 May 2015, Jean-Pierre scored his first goal for Honvéd during a 1-0 win over Ferencváros.

In 2015, he signed for French fifth division club Fabrègues. Before the second half of 2015-16, Jean-Pierre signed for Košice in Slovakia, but left due to them going bankrupt. In 2017, he signed for Baník Ostrava in the Czech top flight, but left due to agent problems. Before the second half of 2017-18, he signed for French fifth division team Canet. In 2018, Jean-Pierre signed for Sète in the French fourth division. In 2021, he signed for French third-tier outfit Stade Briochin.

== International career ==
Jean-Pierre represented France at the 2013 Summer Universiade. He debuted for the Guadeloupe national team in a friendly 2–0 loss to Cape Verde on 23 March 2022.

In 2024, Jean-Pierre was called up to the Madagascar national team. He made his debut on 14 November 2024 in an Africa Cup of Nations qualifier against Tunisia at the Loftus Versfeld Stadium in South Africa. He started the game and assisted on Madagascar's second goal. After Jean-Pierre was substituted at the 88th minute with the score of 2–2, Tunisia scored the winning goal in added time.

== Career statistics ==
=== Club ===
As of match played 20 September 2024

Appearances and goals by club, season and competition
Club	Season	League			National cup (Note: Includes Coupe de France, Magyar Kupa, Slovak Cup, Czech Cup)		Other		Total	
Club	Season	Division	Apps	Goals	Apps	Goals	Apps	Goals	Apps	Goals
Agde	2011-12	CFA	23	0	0	0	—		23	0
Agde	2012-13	CFA 2	23	0	1	0	—		24	0
Agde	Total		46	0	1	0	—		47	0
Béziers	2013-14	CFA	26	1	1	0	—		27	1
Béziers	2014-15	CFA	14	0	0	0	—		14	0
Béziers	Total		40	1	1	0	—		41	1
Honvéd	2014-15	Nemzeti Bajnokság I	4	0	0	0	1 (Note: Appearance(s) in Ligakupa)	1	5	1
Fabrègues	2015-16	CFA 2	8	0	0	0	—		8	0
Košice	2015-16	Slovak 2. Liga	13	0	1	0	—		14	0
Košice	2016-17	Slovak 2. Liga	22	2	1	0	—		23	2
Košice	Total		35	2	2	0	—		37	2
Baník Ostrava	2017-18	Czech First League	5	0	1	0	—		6	0
Canet	2017-18	Championnat National 3	8	0	0	0	—		8	0
Sète	2018-19	Championnat National 2	26	0	4	0	—		30	0
Sète	2019-20	Championnat National 2	19	0	0	0	—		19	0
Sète	Total		45	0	4	0	—		49	0
Gazélec Ajaccio	2020-21	Championnat National 2	9	0	4	0	—		13	0
Stade Briochin	2021-22	Championnat National	27	1	2	0	—		29	1
Stade Briochin	2022-23	Championnat National	28	1	0	0	—		28	1
Stade Briochin	Total		55	2	2	0	—		57	2
Stade Briochin II	2021-22	Championnat National 3	1	0	—		—		1	0
Stade Briochin II	2022-23	Championnat National 3	0	0	—		—		0	0
Stade Briochin II	Total		1	0	—		—		1	0
Orléans	2023-24	Championnat National	26	0	4	0	—		30	0
Orléans	2024-25	Championnat National	5	0	0	0	—		5	0
Orléans	Total		31	0	4	0	—		35	0
Orléans II	2023-24	Championnat National 3	2	0	—		—		2	0
Orléans II	2024-25	Championnat National 3	0	0	—		—		0	0
Orléans II	Total		2	0	—		—		2	0
Career total			289	5	19	0	1	1	309	6

=== International ===
As of match played 17 November 2025

Appearances and goals by national team and year
National team	Year	Apps	Goals
Guadeloupe	2022	6	0
Guadeloupe	Total	6	0
Madagascar	2024	2	0
Madagascar	2025	7	0
Madagascar	Total	9	0
Career total		15	0
