= Saïd Idazza =

Moroccan footballer (born 1989)

Personal information
- Date of birth: 25 April 1989 (age 37)
- Place of birth: Tafraout, Morocco
- Height: 1.77 m (5 ft 10 in)
- Positions: Winger; striker

Team information
- Current team: US Forbach

Senior career*
Years	Team	Apps	(Gls)
–2010	US Sarre-Union		
2010–2012	CSO Amnéville	45	(13)
2012–2015	F91 Dudelange	21	(11)
2015–2016	Sarreguemines FC	19	(12)
2016–2018	US Concarneau	54	(16)
2018	Giresunspor	9	(0)
2019–2022	US Boulogne	52	(10)
2022–	US Forbach		

International career
2011	Morocco U23	1	(0)
- * Club domestic league appearances and goals

Saïd Idazza (born 25 April 1989) is a Moroccan footballer who plays as a winger or striker for US Forbach.

== Early life ==
Idazza is a native of Tafraout, Morocco.

== Career ==
In 2012, he signed for Luxembourgian side F91 Dudelange, where he played in the UEFA Champions League and UEFA Europa League. In 2016, he signed for French side US Concarneau, where he was regarded as one of the club's most important players. He was second top scorer in the 2017–18 Championnat National with fourteen goals. In 2019, he signed for French side US Boulogne, where he suffered an injury.

== Personal life ==
Idazza has been friends with Madagascar international Julio Donisa, who he has shared an agent with. He has been married and has children.
