= Wilfried Rother =

French footballer (born 1990)

Personal information
- Date of birth: 20 September 1990 (age 36)
- Place of birth: Coulommiers, France
- Height: 1.83 m (6 ft 0 in)
- Position: Defender

Team information
- Current team: Thaon

Senior career*
Years	Team	Apps	(Gls)
2009–2014	Troyes	15	(0)
2012–2013	→ Épinal (loan)	30	(1)
2014–2015	Istres	21	(0)
2015–2018	Raon-l'Étape	58	(4)
2018–	Thaon	62	(4)
- * Club domestic league appearances and goals as of 20:49, 12 June 2022 (UTC)

Wilfried Rother (born 20 September 1990) is a French footballer who plays as a defender for Championnat National 3 club ES Thaon.

== Career ==
Rother started his career with Troyes in 2009. He signed a professional contract in 2011, and made his professional debut on 18 January 2012, in a 3–2 Ligue 2 away victory at Angers. Rother was loaned to Épinal for the 2012–13 season. At the end of his contract he left Troyes and joined fellow Ligue 2 club Istres on a free transfer for the 2014–15 season.

Rother signed amateur terms with Raon-l'Étape in July 2015, when it was confirmed that Istres would be administratively relegated to level seven of the French football league system for financial issues.
