= Farid Boulaya =

Algerian footballer (born 1993)

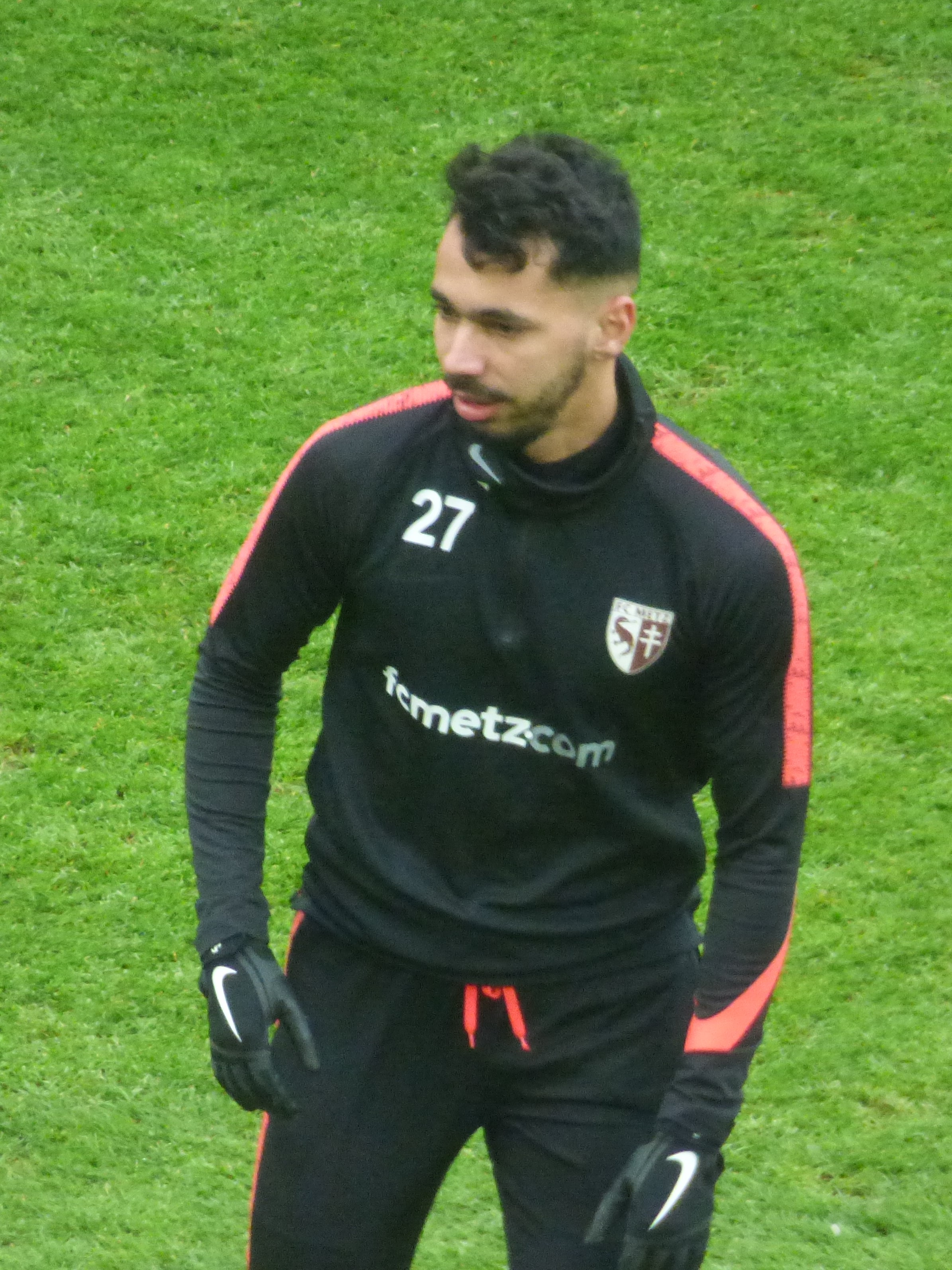
- Boulaya training with Metz in 2019

Personal information
- Date of birth: 25 February 1993 (age 33)
- Place of birth: Vitrolles, France
- Height: 1.79 m (5 ft 10 in)
- Position: Attacking midfielder

Team information
- Current team: USM Alger
- Number: 9

Senior career*
Years	Team	Apps	(Gls)
2011–2015	Istres	46	(1)
2015–2016	Clermont	32	(7)
2015	Clermont B	1	(1)
2016–2017	Bastia	2	(0)
2017	Bastia B	3	(0)
2017–2018	Girona	1	(0)
2018	→ Metz (loan)	7	(0)
2018	→ Metz B (loan)	5	(1)
2018–2022	Metz	113	(18)
2021	Metz B	1	(0)
2022–2024	Al-Gharafa	39	(6)
2024–2025	Al-Wakrah	8	(4)
2026	IMT	15	(2)
2026–	USM Alger	0	(0)

International career^{‡}
2020–2022	Algeria	8	(1)
- * Club domestic league appearances and goals as of 20 August 2026 ‡ National team caps and goals as of 29 August 2026

Farid Boulaya (Arabic: فريد بولاية; born 25 February 1993) is a professional footballer who plays as an attacking midfielder for USM Alger. Born in France, he plays for the Algeria national team.

== Club career ==
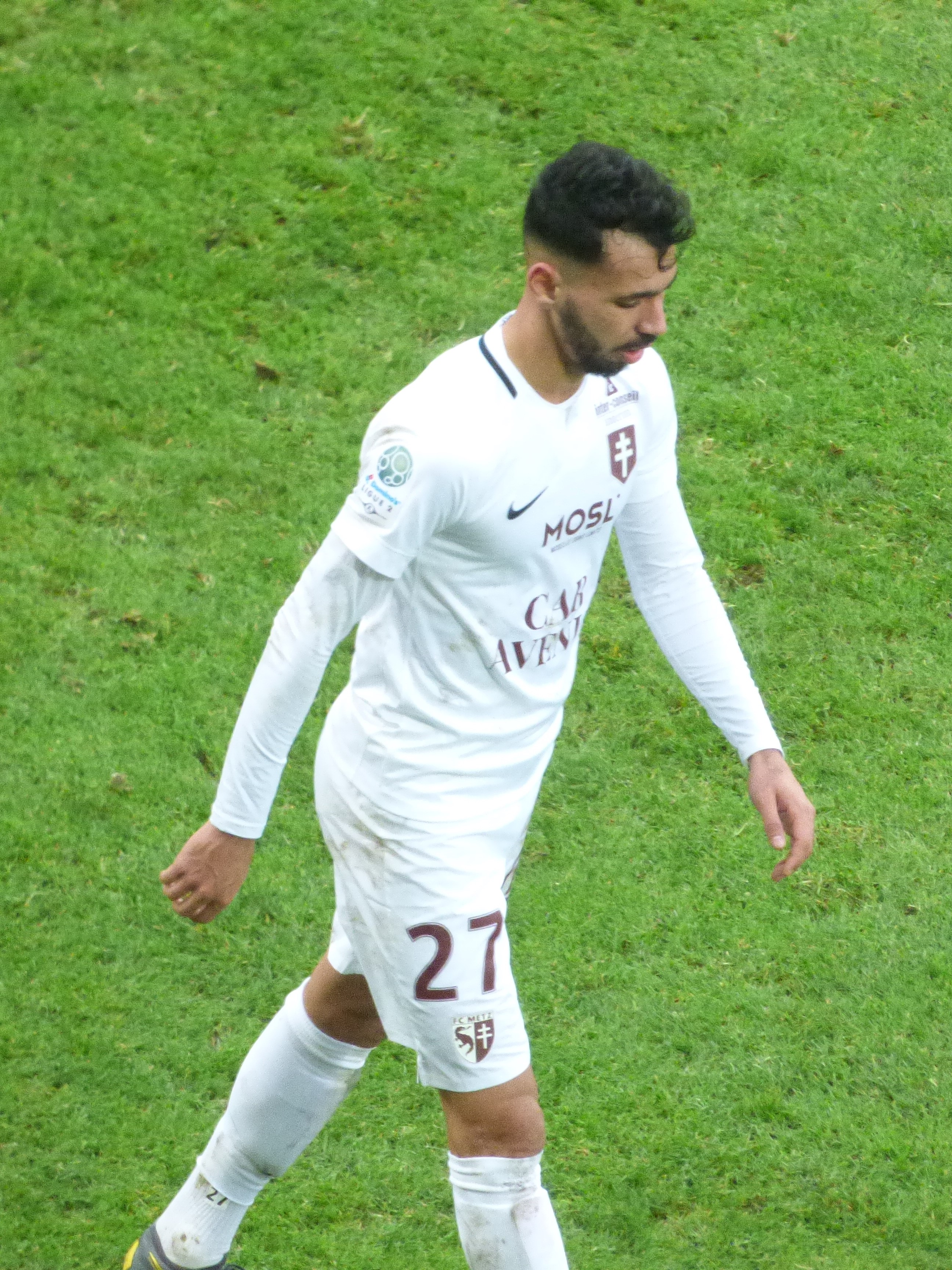
Boulaya in action for FC Metz in 2019

An Istres youth graduate, Boulaya made his professional debut on 11 May 2012, coming on as a substitute for Maxime Tarasconi in a 1–0 defeat away at Lens.

On 31 August 2016, Boulaya signed a four-year deal for Ligue 1 side Bastia. However, he only appeared in two matches for the club.

On 25 July 2017, Boulaya moved abroad for the first time in his career, after agreeing to a three-year deal with La Liga side Girona. In January 2018, he joined Metz on loan.

On 21 August 2022, Boulaya signed a two-year contract with Al-Gharafa in Qatar.

On 11 September 2024, he joined Qatari club Al-Wakrah.

On 20 August 2026, he joined USM Alger.

== International career ==
Boulaya made his debut with the Algeria national team in a 1–0 friendly win over Nigeria on 9 October 2020.

== Honours ==
USM Alger

- CAF Super Cup: 2026
