= Tarasque (disambiguation) =

The tarasque is a legendary creature of France.

Tarasque may also refer to:

- 20mm Tarasque, an anti-aircraft gun
- Tarrasque (Dungeons & Dragons), a Dungeons & Dragons monster

== See also ==
- Tarascon (disambiguation)
