= Tarascon (disambiguation) =

Tarascon is a commune in Bouches-du-Rhône department, France.

Tarascon may also refer to:

== People ==
- Jean-Marie Tarascon (born 1953), French chemist
- Paul Tarascon (1882–1977), French World War I flying ace

== Places ==
- Canton of Tarascon, a former canton of Bouches-du-Rhône department, France
- Tarascon-sur-Ariège, a commune in Ariège department, France

== Other uses ==
- Tarascon (horse), a racehorse

== See also ==
- Tarasque (disambiguation)
- Tarasconi
