= Banfa Diakité =

French footballer (born 1997)

Personal information
- Full name: Banfa Diakité
- Date of birth: 7 October 1997 (age 29)
- Place of birth: Toulouse, France
- Height: 1.79 m (5 ft 10 in)
- Position: Attacking midfielder

Team information
- Current team: Blagnac

Youth career
- Toulouse AC
- Toulouse

Senior career*
Years	Team	Apps	(Gls)
2014–2015	Muret		
2015–2017	Balma	50	(12)
2017–2018	Niort B	13	(0)
2017–2018	Niort	9	(3)
2018–2019	Bourg-en-Bresse	30	(3)
2019–2020	Quevilly-Rouen	21	(4)
2021–2023	Bourges	5	(0)
2022–2023	Bourges B	6	(0)
2023–	Blagnac	11	(4)
- * Club domestic league appearances and goals as of 16:38, 29 December 2023 (UTC)

Banfa Diakité (born 7 October 1997) is a French professional footballer who plays as an attacking midfielder for Championnat National 3 club Blagnac.

== Career ==
Diakité was born in Toulouse in southern France, and played junior football with Toulouse AC and Toulouse FC. However, he was released for being too small and subsequently played one season with Muret in the Division d'Honneur before joining Balma in 2015. During his first season with Balma, he scored six goals in 25 league appearances in the CFA 2.

His performances attracted the attention of several professional teams, and in June 2016 it was announced that he had been signed by Ligue 2 club Amiens. However, the transfer eventually fell through and Diakité returned to Balma for the 2016–17 season. He ended that campaign with an identical record to the previous year of six goals in 25 league matches.

During the summer of 2017, Diakité again courted interest from a number of Ligue 2 clubs. He had trials with Dijon and Nîmes before joining Niort on a two-year contract in May 2017. He made his professional debut in the 4–1 defeat to Valenciennes on 25 August 2017, coming on as a second-half substitute for Antoine Leautey. On 11 November 2017, Diakité scored his first goal for Niort in a 5–1 win over Tournefeuille in the seventh round of the Coupe de France.

Diakité signed for Bourg-en-Bresse on 12 June 2018. On 3 December 2021, he signed for Bourges. In June 2023, he moved to Blagnac.

== Personal life ==
Born in France, Diakité is of Guinean descent.

== Career statistics ==
As of match played 16 December 2023

Appearances and goals by club, season and competition
Club	Season	League			National Cup		Other		Total	
Club	Season	Division	Apps	Goals	Apps	Goals	Apps	Goals	Apps	Goals
Balma	2015–16	CFA 2	25	6	2	0	0	0	27	6
Balma	2016–17	CFA 2	25	6	2	0	0	0	27	6
Balma	Total		50	12	4	0	0	0	54	12
Niort II	2017–18	National 3	13	3	—		—		13	3
Niort	2017–18	Ligue 2	9	0	3	1	0	0	12	1
Bourg-en-Bresse	2018–19	National	30	3	1	0	0	0	31	3
Quevilly-Rouen	2019–20	National	21	4	1	0	0	0	22	4
Bourges	2021–22	National 2	5	0	0	0	—		5	0
Bourges	2022–23	National 2	0	0	0	0	—		1	0
Bourges	Total		5	0	0	0	0	0	5	0
Bourges B	2021–22	National 3	5	0	—		—		5	0
Bourges B	2022–23	National 3	1	0	—		—		1	0
Bourges B	Total		6	0	0	0	0	0	6	0
Blagnac	2023–24	National 3	11	4	2	1	—		13	5
Career total			145	26	11	2	0	0	156	28
