= Jordan Millot =

French footballer (born 1990)

Personal information
- Date of birth: 23 October 1990 (age 36)
- Place of birth: Hyères, France
- Height: 1.80 m (5 ft 11 in)
- Position: Midfielder

Team information
- Current team: Moulins Yzeure
- Number: 11

Youth career
- Clermont

Senior career*
Years	Team	Apps	(Gls)
2011–2012	Clermont	1	(0)
2012–2014	Clermont B	26	(2)
2014–	Moulins Yzeure	147	(26)
- * Club domestic league appearances and goals as of 19:04, 9 January 2022 (UTC)

Jordan Millot (born 23 October 1990) is a French professional footballer who plays as a midfielder for Championnat National 1 club Moulins Yzeure. He previously played for Clermont, and made his senior debut on 4 February 2012, coming on as a substitute for Benjamin Morel in a 2–1 defeat to Châteauroux.
