= Sofiane Sidi Ali =

French footballer (born 1995)

Personal information
- Date of birth: July 14, 1995 (age 31)
- Place of birth: Gap, France
- Height: 1.75 m (5 ft 9 in)
- Position: Forward

Team information
- Current team: Marseille
- Number: 41

Youth career
- FC La Saulce
- Gap
- Istres

Senior career*
Years	Team	Apps	(Gls)
2017–2018	AS Gémenos	19	(2)
2018–2020	Panionios	17	(0)
2021–2023	FC Rousset SVO	36	(21)
2023–	Marseille B	28	(15)
2024–	Marseille	2	(0)
- * Club domestic league appearances and goals as of 19 May 2024

Sofiane Sidi Ali (Arabic: سفيان سيدي علي; born 14 July 1995) is a French professional footballer who plays as a forward for Championnat National 3 club Marseille B.

== Club career ==
Sidi Ali was a youth product of the clubs FC La Saulce, Gap and Istres, before quitting football altogether to pursue a career in nursing. After graduating in 2014, he returned to football and eventually began his senior career in the Championnat National 3 with AS Gémenos in 2017. In 2018, he was recruited by José Anigo to the Greek club Panionios in the Super League Greece on a three-year contract where he began his professional career. After a short stint there, he terminated his contract with Panionios before returning to the Championnat National 3 with FC Rousset SVO. Scoring 13 goals in 21 games with them, he transferred to Marseille's reserves on 6 January 2023.

Sidi Ali was called up to the Marseille senior team for a Coupe de France match on 21 January 2024.

== International career ==
Born in France, Sidi Ali is of Algerian descent and holds dual-citizenship.
