= Ambroise Gboho =

Ivorian footballer (born 1994)

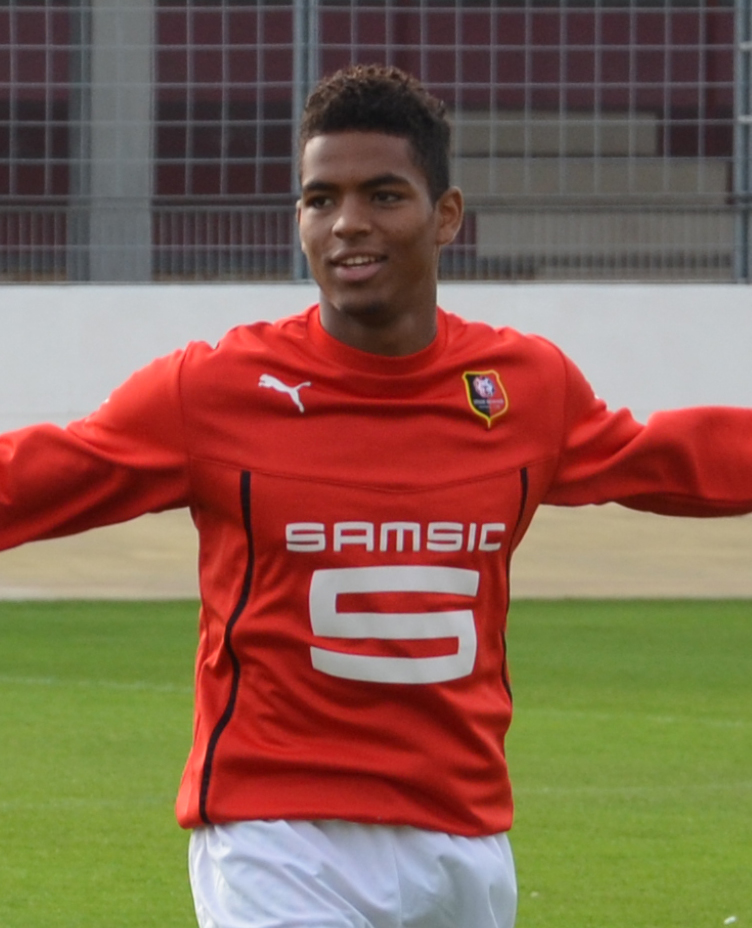
- Gboho with Rennes B in September 2013

Personal information
- Date of birth: 6 August 1994 (age 32)
- Place of birth: Man, Ivory Coast
- Height: 1.76 m (5 ft 9 in)
- Position: Forward

Team information
- Current team: Swift Hesperange
- Number: 24

Youth career
- –2013: FC Chauray

Senior career*
Years	Team	Apps	(Gls)
2013–2016	Rennes B	31	(1)
2016–2017	Épinal	31	(7)
2017–2018	Les Herbiers	25	(7)
2018–2021	Westerlo	58	(9)
2021–2022	Chambly	12	(3)
2022	Laval	8	(0)
2022	Laval B	1	(1)
2022–2024	Concarneau	29	(5)
2024–	Swift Hesperange	25	(6)
- * Club domestic league appearances and goals as of 26 June 2025

Ambroise Gboho (born 6 August 1994) is an Ivorian professional footballer who plays as a forward for Luxembourgish club Swift Hesperange.

== Career ==
While playing for Les Herbiers, Gboho scored the club's second goal in a 2–0 win over Chambly in the Coupe de France semi-finals. They eventually lost to Ligue 1 winners Paris Saint-Germain in the final.

In June 2018, Gboho joined Belgian First Division B club Westerlo. On 19 July 2021, he signed with Chambly in France.

On 26 January 2022, Gboho moved to Laval until the end of the season, with an option for an additional year.

== Personal life ==
Gboho holds both Ivorian and French nationalities. He is the uncle of the French youth international footballer, Yann Gboho.

== Honours ==
Les Herbiers

- Coupe de France runner-up: 2017–18

Laval

- Championnat National: 2021–22
