= Maodomalick Faye =

Senegalese footballer

Malick Faye
Personal information
- Full name: Maodo Malick Faye
- Date of birth: December 13, 1987 (age 38)
- Place of birth: Kahone, Senegal
- Height: 1.79 m (5 ft 10 in)
- Position: Striker

Team information
- Current team: CS Feytiat

Youth career
- ASC Yeggo
- 2005–2006: AS Saint-Étienne

Senior career*
Years	Team	Apps	(Gls)
2006–2010	AS Saint-Étienne	8	(0)
2008–2009	→ Tours FC (loan)	26	(1)
2010–2011	Chambéry	9	(2)
2011–2012	AS Cannes	20	(4)
2012–2013	Aurillac Arpajon	7	(4)
2014–2016	Limoges FC	31	(8)
2016–	CS Feytiat	7	(1)
- * Club domestic league appearances and goals as of 17:44, 15 November 2017 (UTC)

Maodomalick Faye (born December 13, 1987, in Kahone) is a Senegalese footballer, who is currently playing for French side CS Feytiat.

== Career ==
Faye made his Ligue 1 debut for AS Saint-Étienne as an injury time substitute in their 2–0 away win at AS Nancy Lorraine on 25 January 2007. For the 2008–09 season Faye signed a three year professional contract and was loaned to Ligue 2 side Tours FC, where he scored his first professional goal in the 95th minute of the game against Angers SCO on 3 April 2009. During his time at Tours he also scored a hat-trick in the Coupe de France; the 7–1 round of 64 victory over SS Jeanne d'Arc, played in Réunion.

Since leaving Saint-Étienne at the end of his contract, Faye has played as an amateur at a number of clubs in the fourth and fifth level of French football, including Chambéry, AS Cannes, Aurillac Arpajon and CS Feytiat. Whilst at Chambéry, he was part of the team which reached the quarter final of the 2010–11 Coupe de France, beating Monaco, Brest and Sochaux on the way. He scored the goal in the Round of 32 match against Brest. He wasn't involved in the quarter final tie due to a seven match suspension received for fighting during a league game.
