= Quentin Bonnet =

French professional footballer (born 1990)

Personal information
- Date of birth: 24 August 1990 (age 36)
- Place of birth: La Roche-sur-Yon, France
- Height: 1.78 m (5 ft 10 in)
- Position: Defender

Team information
- Current team: La Roche

Youth career
- Nantes

Senior career*
Years	Team	Apps	(Gls)
2010–2013	Vannes	54	(0)
2013–2015	Le Poiré-sur-Vie	52	(1)
2015–2016	Avranches	24	(1)
2016–2019	Les Herbiers B	14	(1)
2016–2019	Les Herbiers	45	(1)
2019–	La Roche	7	(1)
- * Club domestic league appearances and goals as of 15:49, 18 November 2019 (UTC)

Quentin Bonnet (born 24 August 1990) is a French professional footballer who currently plays for La Roche VF as a defender.

== Career statistics ==
As of 11 November 2017.

Club	Division	Season	League		Cup		League Cup		Total	
Club	Division	Season	Apps	Goals	Apps	Goals	Apps	Goals	Apps	Goals
Vannes	National	2011–12	24	0	1	0	1	0	26	0
Vannes	National	2012–13	30	0	1	0	1	0	32	0
Le Poiré-sur-Vie	National	2013–14	21	0	0	0	0	0	21	0
Le Poiré-sur-Vie	National	2014–15	31	1	5	1	0	0	36	2
Avranches	National	2015–16	24	1	2	0	0	0	26	1
Les Herbiers	National	2016–17	8	0	1	0	0	0	9	0
Les Herbiers	National	2017–18	6	0	1	1	0	0	7	1
Career total			144	2	11	2	2	0	157	4
