= Jacky Meindu =

New Caledonian footballer (born 1989)

Personal information
- Date of birth: 6 June 1989 (age 37)
- Place of birth: New Caledonia
- Position: Midfielder

Team information
- Current team: Sud Nivernais Imphy Decize

Senior career*
Years	Team	Apps	(Gls)
2016	USC Nouméa		
2016–2020	Sud Nivernais Imphy Decize		
2021–2023	US Raon-l'Étape		

International career^{‡}
2016–	New Caledonia	2	(0)
- * Club domestic league appearances and goals as of 22:21, 14 November 2017 (UTC) ‡ National team caps and goals as of 25 June 2016

Jacky Meindu (born 6 June 1989) is a New Caledonian footballer who plays as a midfielder for Sud Nivernais Imphy Decize in the French Division d'Honneur.

He signed for the French club from USC Nouméa in New Caledonia in November 2016.
