= Jan Kaye =

Swiss footballer (born 1996)

Personal information
- Full name: Jan Kaye
- Date of birth: 29 January 1996 (age 30)
- Place of birth: Geneva, Switzerland
- Height: 1.88 m (6 ft 2 in)
- Position: Striker

Team information
- Current team: Grande-Synthe

Youth career
- Evian

Senior career*
Years	Team	Apps	(Gls)
2014–2016	Evian B	14	(2)
2015–2016	Evian	8	(0)
2016–2019	Troyes B	28	(9)
2016–2019	Troyes	2	(0)
2017	→ Grenoble (loan)	3	(0)
2017–2018	→ Andrézieux (loan)	25	(3)
2019–2020	Saint-Malo	10	(0)
2020–	Grande-Synthe	2	(0)
- * Club domestic league appearances and goals as of 21:02, 28 January 2021 (UTC)

Jan Kaye (born 29 January 1996) is a Swiss professional footballer who plays as a striker for Régional 1 club Grande-Synthe.

== Career ==
In January 2017, Kaye joined Grenoble on loan from Troyes. In April, having made just three appearances, the loan was cut short.

== Personal life ==
Kaye was born in Switzerland to a Belgian father and Martiniquais mother.
