= Biesheim =

Commune in Grand Est, France

- Commune
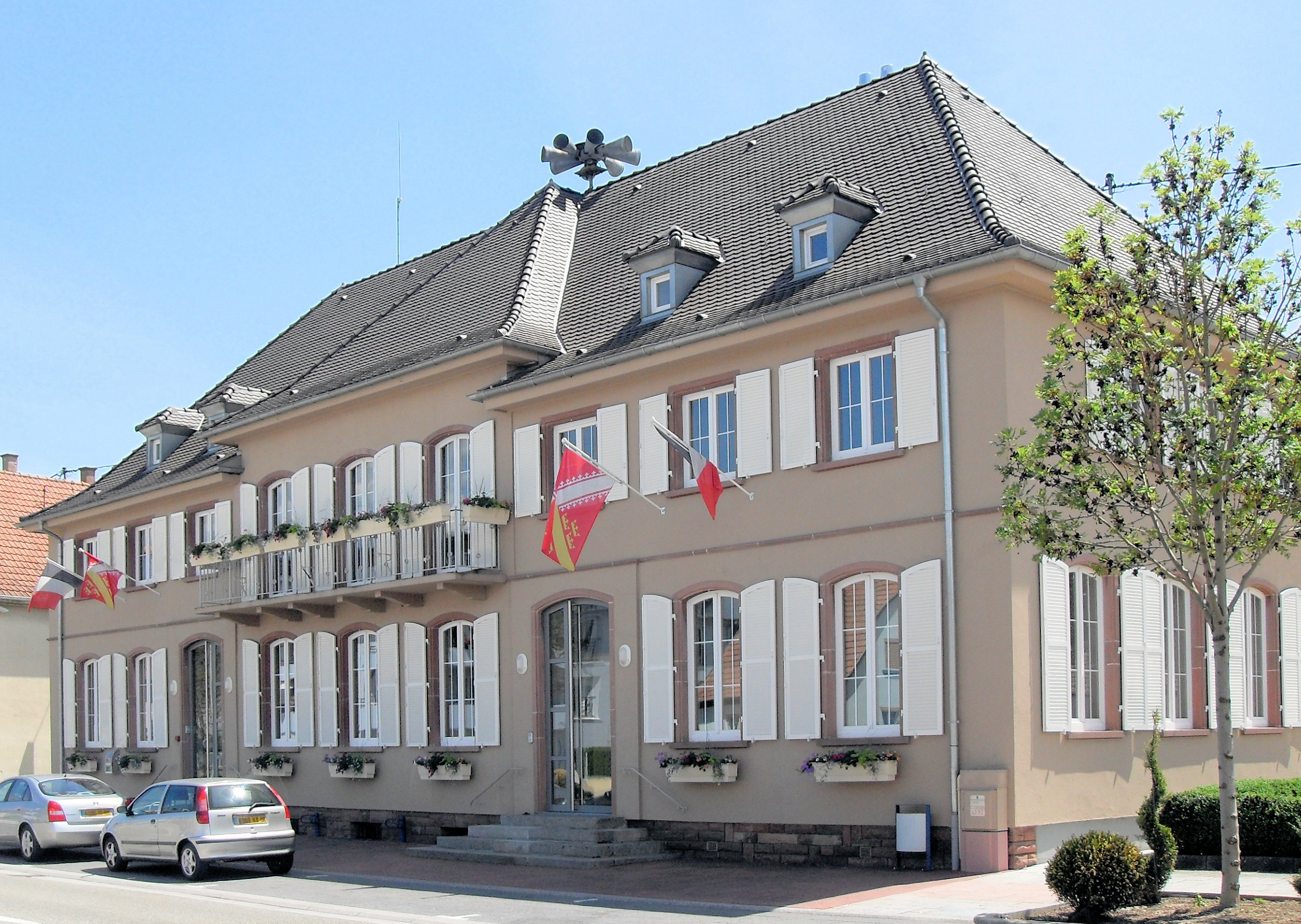
- The town hall in Biesheim

- Coat of arms
- Location of Biesheim
- Location within France Location within Grand Est
- Coordinates: 48°02′30″N 7°32′38″E
- Country: France
- Region: Grand Est
- Department: Haut-Rhin
- Arrondissement: Colmar-Ribeauvillé
- Canton: Ensisheim

Government
  - Mayor (2020–2026): Gérard Hug
- Area^{1}: 16.55 km^{2} (6.39 sq mi)
- Elevation: 190 m (620 ft)
- Highest elevation: 194 m (636 ft)
- Lowest elevation: 184 m (604 ft)
- Population (2023): 2,499
  - Density: 151.0/km^{2} (391.1/sq mi)
- Time zone: UTC+01:00 (CET)
  - Summer (DST): UTC+02:00 (CEST)
- INSEE/Postal code: 68036 /68600
- ^{1} French Land Register data, which excludes lakes, ponds, glaciers > 1 km^{2} (0.386 sq mi or 247 acres) and river estuaries.

Biesheim (French pronunciation: [bisaim]; Alsatian: Biese) is a commune in the Haut-Rhin department in Grand Est in north-eastern France.

== Population ==
Historical population
Year	Pop.	±% p.a.
1968	1,148	—
1975	1,874	+7.25%
1982	1,959	+0.64%
1990	2,125	+1.02%
1999	2,315	+0.96%
2007	2,299	−0.09%
2012	2,506	+1.74%
2017	2,571	+0.51%
2023	2,499	−0.47%
Source: INSEE

== Archaeology ==
Remains of a Mithraeum have been unearthed in Biesheim in 1977.

== See also ==
- Communes of the Haut-Rhin department
