= William Sea =

French footballer (born 1992)

Personal information
- Full name: William Sea Nessemon
- Date of birth: 3 March 1992 (age 34)
- Place of birth: Juvisy-sur-Orge, France
- Height: 1.76 m (5 ft 9 1/2 in)
- Position: Winger

Team information
- Current team: US Granville

Youth career
- 2008–2010: Bastia
- 2010–2012: Ajaccio

Senior career*
Years	Team	Apps	(Gls)
2012–2013	Corte	15	(5)
2014–2016	Brest B	13	(4)
2014–2016	Brest	27	(0)
2016	Amiens	6	(0)
2016–2017	Concarneau	15	(1)
2017–2018	L'Entente SSG	28	(8)
2018–2019	Tours B	4	(1)
2018–2019	Tours	7	(0)
2019–	US Granville	8	(0)
- * Club domestic league appearances and goals as of 02:28, 10 February 2020 (UTC)

William Sea (born 3 March 1992) is a French professional footballer who plays as a forward for US Granville.

He is the half-brother of former professional footballers Cyril Yapi and Romaric Yapi.

== Club career ==
After making his debut in the French lower divisions, Sea joined Brest in December 2013 and made his full professional debut a few weeks later, in a 1–0 Ligue 2 victory over Auxerre. He was loaned out to Amiens for the second part of the 2015–16 season, before joining US Concarneau in the summer of 2016. In February 2018 he gained attention for scoring with a bicycle kick from the edge of the penalty area, playing for L'Entente SSG in a match against Lyon Duchère AS.
