= ES Thaon =

French football club

Thaon
- Full name: Entente Sportive Thaon-les-Vosges
- Founded: 1920
- Ground: Stade Robert Sayer, Capavenir-Vosges
- Capacity: 2,500
- Chairman: Nicolas Clasadonte
- League: National 3 Group I
- 2022–23: National 3 Group F, 5th

Entente Sportive Thaon-les-Vosges, known as ES Thaon or Thaon, is a French football club based in Thaon-les-Vosges, Vosges. It was founded in 1920. The club currently plays in the Championnat National 3, the fifth tier of the French football league system.

== History ==
The club was founded in 1920.

It was not until the 2000-2001 season that ES Thaon returned to the spotlight; then in the Division d'Honneur, it reached the 32nd the Coupe de France for the second time in its history and met the prestigious club Olympique de Marseille. In front of 8,000 people, the match was played at the Stade de La Colombière in Épinal, the Robert Sayer stadium not being certified to host the Marseille professionals. In freezing cold, Olympique de Marseille won this match four goals to zero.

On 29 May 2002, ES Thaon was officially champion of the Division d'Honneur for the first time in its history and, at the same time, reached the national level for the first time, in CFA 2. The 2002-2003 season was one of the best in the club's history with a third-place finish behind SC Schiltigheim and Jura Sud Foot, the latter having the same number of points as Thaon, but possessing a better goal difference. The following season, Thaon finished in an honorable seventh place before collapsing and finishing last in Group B of CFA 2 at the end of the 2004-2005 season.

During the 2006-2007 season, ES Thaon met FC Gueugnon, then a Ligue 2 club, in the 64th the Coupe de France. 2,500 people saw the Thaonnais push the professionals to extra time, the latter avoiding a penalty shootout by scoring two goals in stoppage time (1-3). The same season, Thaon finished second in the Division d'Honneur and reached the CFA 2 once again. After two seasons at the bottom of the table, ES Thaon returned to the regional level at the end of the 2008-2009 season.

During the 2010-2011 season, ES Thaon obtained the second trophy in its history by finishing as champion of the Division d'Honneur and once again reached the CFA 2, a level at which the club would remain for five consecutive seasons. During the 2012-2013 edition of the Coupe de France, Thaon reached the round of 32 of the competition after eliminating FC Dijon Parc (DH) and FCSR Haguenau (DH). Thaon faced FC Sochaux-Montbéliard, then in Ligue 1, which won the match by the narrowest of margins, one goal to zero, against courageous Thaonnais. During the 2016-2017 season, ES Thaon won the Coupe de Lorraine for the first time in its history by beating FC Lunéville in the final with a score of one goal to zero.

During the 2017-2018 season, ES Thaon won the Régional 1 championship and was officially promoted to National 3 (formerly CFA 2). During the 2021-2022 season, ES Thaon qualified for the Coupe de France by eliminating AS Beauvais-Oise on penalties and left the competition with its head held high against Stade de Reims in the following round, with a score of one goal to zero. In 2022-2023, ES Thaon qualified for the 16th the Coupe de France by eliminating Amiens SC, 3 divisions above it, on penalties. In the next round, the Thaonnais once again performed strongly but were eliminated by FC Nantes on penalties.

On 7 January 2023, Thaon, while playing in the fifth-tier of French football, eliminated professional Ligue 2 side Amiens from the Coupe de France. Despite being down to ten men, Thaon held a 0–0 draw before winning 4–2 on penalties. The club repeated themselves with a 0–0 draw against Ligue 1 side FC Nantes, however the game end with a loss in the penalties after Théo Gazagnes and Victor Didierjean's mistakes.
