= Clément Badin =

French footballer (born 1993)

Personal information
- Full name: Clément Jordan Badin
- Date of birth: 26 May 1993 (age 33)
- Place of birth: Bruges, France
- Height: 1.68 m (5 ft 6 in)
- Position: Winger

Team information
- Current team: Fleury
- Number: 22

Youth career
- Saint-Yzan de Soudiac
- 2005–2006: Saint André de Cubzac
- 2006–2010: Libourne

Senior career*
Years	Team	Apps	(Gls)
2010–2012	Libourne		
2012–2013	Trélissac	28	(2)
2013–2015	Bordeaux B	38	(1)
2014–2015	Bordeaux	0	(0)
2015	→ Avilés (loan)	9	(1)
2015–2016	Bergerac	18	(3)
2016–2017	Trélissac	27	(3)
2017–2020	Bergerac	67	(14)
2020–2021	Blois	7	(1)
2021–	Fleury	116	(24)
- * Club domestic league appearances and goals as of 23 June 2026

Clément Jordan Badin (born 26 May 1993) is a French professional footballer who plays as a winger for Ligue 3 club Fleury.

== Career ==
Born in Bruges, Gironde, Badin played for lowly sides AS Saint-Yzan de Soudiac and FC Saint André de Cubzac before joining Libourne in 2006, aged 13. He made his senior debuts with the latter in the CFA 2, appearing in two league matches as his side were relegated.

In June 2012 Badin moved to CFA's Trélissac. After appearing regularly he moved to Bordeaux in May of the following year, being assigned to the reserves also in the fourth level. On 4 June 2014, Badin signed a one-year professional deal with Bordeaux, being also promoted to the main squad. He played his first match as a professional on 28 October, coming on as a late substitute in a 3–1 Coupe de la Ligue away win against Toulouse. On 30 January 2015, Badin was loaned to Spanish Segunda División B side Real Avilés until the end of the season.
