= Reyza Soudant =

French footballer (born 1991)

Personal information
- Date of birth: 26 August 1991 (age 34)
- Place of birth: Morocco
- Positions: Midfielder; forward

Senior career*
Years	Team	Apps	(Gls)
-2009	Paris Saint-Germain F.C.	0	(0)
2009/2010	S.S.D. Pomezia Calcio		
2010-2011	Robur Siena	11	(10)
2011/2012	U.S. Catanzaro 1929	17	(9)
2011/2012	A.C. Isola Liri	16	(3)
2013-2014	A.S.D. Sorrento	17	(5)
2017-2018/19	FCM Aubervilliers	13	(4)
- * Club domestic league appearances and goals

Reyza Soudant (born 26 August 1991 in Morocco) is a French footballer.
