= Julio Donisa =

Malagasy footballer (born 1994)

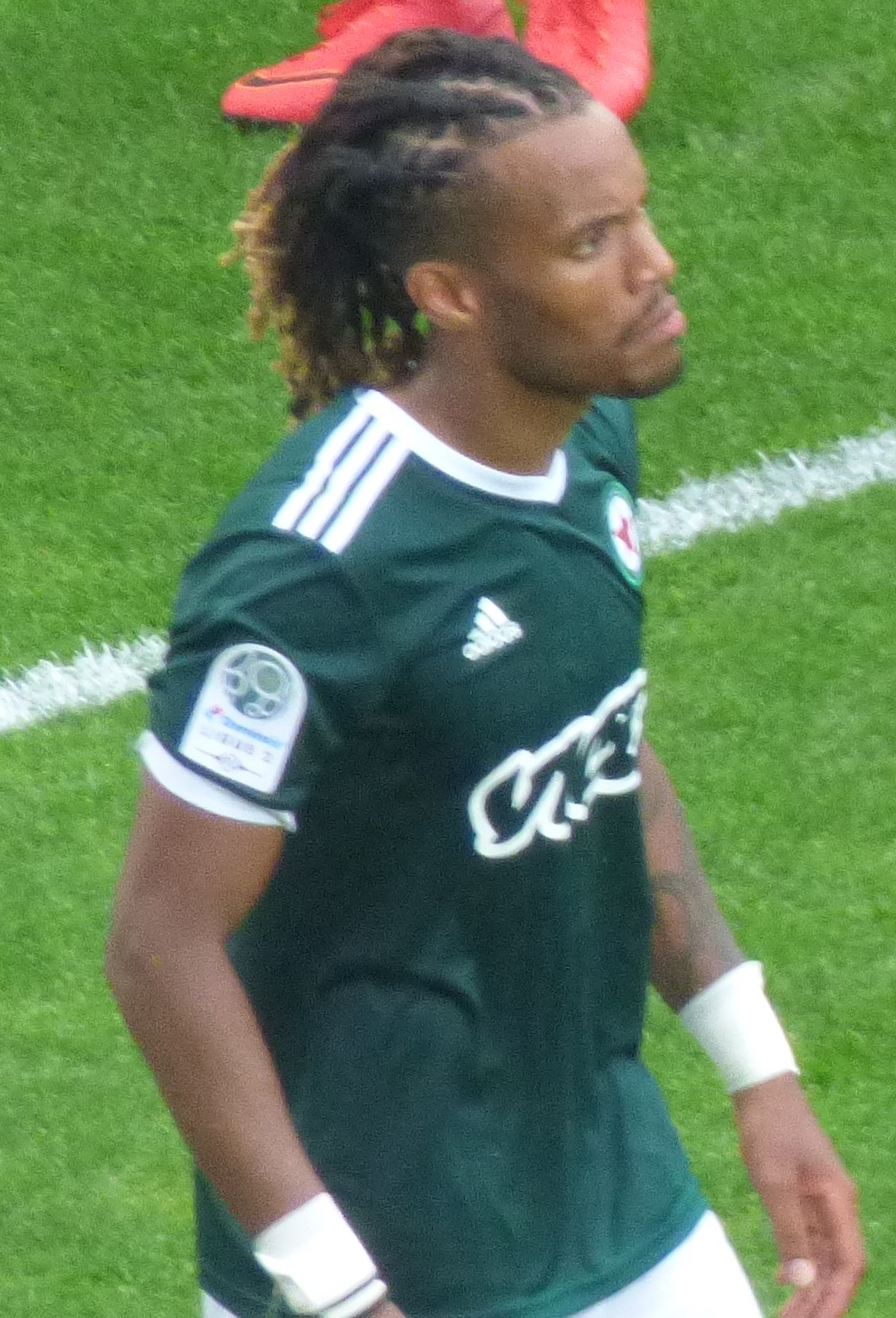
- Donisa with Red Star in 2018

Personal information
- Full name: Julio Kenny Donisa
- Date of birth: 15 January 1994 (age 32)
- Place of birth: L'Haÿ-les-Roses, France
- Height: 1.84 m (6 ft 0 in)
- Position: Forward

Team information
- Current team: Sablé

Youth career
- CS Brétigny
- –2013: Rouen

Senior career*
Years	Team	Apps	(Gls)
2013–2014	Battipagliese	25	(2)
2013–2014	Racing Fondi	13	(0)
2015–2017	AS Pagny	50	(16)
2017–2018	Concarneau	31	(8)
2018–2019	Red Star	18	(2)
2019	→ Lyon-Duchère (loan)	10	(4)
2019–2020	Clermont	24	(0)
2020–2022	Le Mans	38	(7)
2022	Le Mans II	2	(3)
2022–2023	Argeș Pitești	9	(0)
2023–2024	Deauville		
2024–	Sablé	10	(7)

International career^{‡}
2018–2019	Martinique	5	(0)
2022–2023	Madagascar	6	(1)
- * Club domestic league appearances and goals as of 8 December 2024 ‡ National team caps and goals as of 28 March 2023

Julio Kenny Donisa (born 15 January 1994) is a professional footballer who plays as a forward for Championnat National 3 club Sablé. Born in France, he formerly represented the Martinique national team before switching to represent the Madagascar national team.

== Club career ==
Having arrived from Martinique, Donisa trained with CS Brétigny-sur-Orge and later played with the U19 team of FC Rouen. Having almost secured a move to Parma whilst at Rouen, a move which fell through over a disagreement about compensation due to the Brétigny club, he moved to Italy anyway, playing with Battipagliese and Fondi.

In 2015 he joined AS Pagny-sur Moselle after being involved in a training match organised by his agent. In his second season with the club he scored thirteen goals, and was signed by Concarneau to play in the Championnat National.

Donisa was designated revelation of the Championnat National for the 2017–18 season, and earned a move to Red Star F.C., signing a two-year professional contract at the start of the 2018–19 season. On 27 July 2018, the first matchday of the 2018–19 season, Donisa made his Ligue 2 debut with Red Star in a 2–1 home defeat to Niort.

In January 2019, he was loaned to AS Lyon-Duchère from Red Star until the end of the season. Whilst at Lyon-Duchère he caught the eye of recruiters from Clermont Foot, and eventually signed a two-year contract with them in August 2019.

In June 2020, Donisa signed for Le Mans FC.

== International career ==
=== Martinique ===
Donisa was born in France and is of Martiniquais and Réunionnais-Malagasy descent. He made his debut for the Martinique national football team in a 1–0 2019–20 CONCACAF Nations League qualifying win over Puerto Rico on 13 October 2018.

=== Madagascar ===
In May 2022, he was called up to represent the Madagascar national team. He debuted with Madagascar in a 3–0 2023 Africa Cup of Nations qualification loss to Ghana on 1 June 2022.

== Career statistics ==
As of match played 27 March 2023

Appearances and goals by national team and year
National team	Year	Apps	Goals
Martinique	2018	2	0
Martinique	2019	3	0
Total		5	0
Madagascar	2022	5	1
Madagascar	2023	1	0
Total		6	1

As of matches played 27 September 2022
Scores and results list Madagascar's goal tally first, score column indicates score after each Donisa goal.

List of international goals scored by Julio Donisa
No.	Date	Venue	Opponent	Score	Result	Competition
1	27 September 2022	Stade El Bachir, Mohammedia, Morocco	Benin	2–1	3–1	Friendly
