= Stade de la Colombière =

Stadium in Épinal, France

Coordinates: 48°10′43″N 6°28′1″E

The Stade de la Colombière is a football stadium in Épinal, Grand Est, France.

It is the home of French football club SAS Épinal. The capacity of the stadium is around 8,200 supporters.
