= Maxime Tarasconi =

French footballer (born 1990)

Personal information
- Date of birth: 6 April 1990 (age 36)
- Place of birth: Saint-Étienne, France
- Height: 1.75 m (5 ft 9 in)
- Position: Midfielder

Team information
- Current team: AS Gémenos

Senior career*
Years	Team	Apps	(Gls)
2011–2013	Istres	32	(0)
2013–2014	Louhans-Cuiseaux FC	10	(2)
2014–2015	US Granville	18	(4)
2015–2016	Toulon	3	(0)
2016–2017	US Le Pontet		
2017–	AS Gémenos	26	(0)
- * Club domestic league appearances and goals as of 1 July 2019

Maxime Tarasconi (born 6 April 1990) is a French professional footballer who plays as a midfielder for Championnat National 3 side AS Gémenos.

== Career ==
Tarasconi signed his first professional contract with Ligue 2 side FC Istres in 2011, making his league debut on 5 August that year as a substitute in the 2–1 victory against RC Lens. He went on to play 32 times over two seasons for Istres, most often as a substitute. At the end of his contract he was released. He found his next club, Louhans-Cuiseaux FC, through the coach of the unemployed Professional footballers union, although he didn't join immediately, looking at options abroad until late January 2014.

Leaving Louhans-Cuiseaux after just one season he moved from one amateur French club to another. First to US Granville in July 2014, then to SC Toulon in February 2016, US Le Pontet in August 2016 and AS Gémenos in July 2017.
