= FC Fleury 91 (men) =

French football club

Fleury
- Full name: Football Club Fleury 91
- Founded: 1991; 35 years ago
- Ground: Stade Auguste Gentelet, Fleury-Mérogis
- Capacity: 2,000
- Chairman: Pascal Bovis
- Manager: Maxime D'Ornano
- League: Ligue 3
- 2025–26: Championnat National, 4th of 17
- Website: www.fcfleury91.fr
| Home colours | Away colours |

FC Fleury 91 (French pronunciation: [ɛf.se flœʁi katʁə.vɛ̃.ɔ̃z]) is a French professional association football club based in Fleury-Mérogis. It competes in Ligue 3 as of the 2026–27 season.

== History ==
In 2015, a petition was sent to mayor David Derroutet demanding adequate training space for the Under-19s and seniors. Consequently, the case was taken to court.

Ahead of the 2015–16 season, the club changed its name from US Fleury-Mérogis to Football Club Fleury 91.

The club carries on its official shield a CRF logo identical to that of Brazilian giants CR Flamengo. Fleury 91 officially declared that wishes to be known as the Flamengo of France and that they are inspired by Brazilian football.

On 3 May 2025, Fleury secure champions of 2024–25 Championnat National 2 and promotion to Championnat National for the first time in their history from next season after defeat from Feignies 1–2 at home in Matchweek 28 of Group A due to FC 93 BBG defeat from Beauvais Oise 3–2.

== Current squad ==
As of 5 September 2026.

Note: Flags indicate national team as defined under FIFA eligibility rules; some limited exceptions apply. Players may hold more than one non-FIFA nationality.

| No. | Pos. | Nation | Player |
|---|---|---|---|
| 1 | GK | FRA | Antoine Petit |
| 2 | DF | GLP | Freddy Colombo |
| 3 | DF | FRA | Thibaut Plisson |
| 4 | DF | FRA | Quentin Vogt |
| 6 | MF | FRA | Grégoire Lefebvre |
| 7 | FW | FRA | Yannis Verdier |
| 8 | MF | FRA | Romain Lelevé |
| 9 | FW | MTN | Souleymane Anne |
| 10 | MF | FRA | Yoann Le Méhauté |
| 11 | FW | FRA | Jonathan Rivas |
| 12 | MF | FRA | Titouan Thomas |
| 14 | FW | MTQ | Marvyn Belliard |
| 15 | MF | CMR | Franck Angong |
| 16 | GK | ALG | Amine Boukemouche |

| No. | Pos. | Nation | Player |
|---|---|---|---|
| 17 | FW | FRA | Valentin Lavigne |
| 18 | MF | FRA | Cheikhou Cissé |
| 19 | FW | MTQ | Kévin Farade |
| 20 | MF | ALG | Cyril Khetir |
| 21 | DF | CMR | Jovanie Tchouatcha |
| 22 | MF | FRA | Clément Badin |
| 23 | DF | MAD | Enzo Bovis |
| 25 | DF | MAD | Morgan Jean-Pierre |
| 26 | DF | FRA | Hamadou Karamoko |
| 27 | DF | FRA | Heraba Gassama |
| 28 | MF | FRA | Nadir Homssa |
| 29 | DF | FRA | Ali Rouba |
| 40 | GK | HAI | Gaël Alette |

== Honours ==
- Championnat National 2 Group C: 2024–25
