= 2016–17 Coupe de France preliminary rounds, Alsace, Lorraine and Champagne-Ardenne =

The 2016–17 Coupe de France preliminary rounds, Alsace, Lorraine and Champagne-Ardenne made up the qualifying competition to decide which teams from the Alsace, Lorraine and Champagne-Ardenne leagues took part in the main competition from round 7. This was the 100th season of the football cup competition of France. The competition was organised by the French Football Federation (FFF) and is open to all clubs in French football, as well as clubs from the overseas departments and territories (Guadeloupe, French Guiana, Martinique, Mayotte, New Caledonia (qualification via 2016 New Caledonia Cup), Tahiti (qualification via 2016 Tahiti Cup), Réunion, and Saint Martin).

The qualifying rounds took place between April and October 2016.

== Second round ==
=== Second round (Alsace) ===
These matches were played between 21 and 31 August 2016.

Second round results: Alsace

Tie no	Home team (tier)	Score	Away team (tier)
1.	AS Riespsach (8)	3–5	AS Mertzen (9)
2.	SS Beinheim (11)	3–1 (a.e.t.)	US Mommenheim (12)
3.	ALFC Duttlenheim (8)	11–0	CS Bernardswiller (13)
4.	ASLC Berstett (13)	2–4	AS Willgottheim (11)
5.	ASC Blaesheim (13)	1–7	AS Mutzig (8)
6.	AS Chatenois (11)	2–5	OC Lipsheim (11)
7.	US Dachstein (11)	3–1	FC Montagne Verte Strasbourg (9)
8.	FC Dahlenheim (10)	4–2	AS Strasbourg (9)
9.	US Dalhunden (12)	1–3 (a.e.t.)	FC Durrenbach (10)
10.	SC Dettwiller (12)	1–1 (4–3 p)	AS Ingwiller (9)
11.	FC Ebersmunster (15)	0–3	FC Herbsheim (11)
12.	US Eckwersheim (11)	1–0	FC Geudertheim (10)
13.	FC Ernolsheim-lès-Saverne (12)	4–0	FC Marmoutier (11)
14.	CS Fegersheim (9)	1–2 (a.e.t.)	US Baldenheim (9)
15.	AS Forstfeld (12)	0–2	FC Riedseltz (10)
16.	Fatih-Sport Haguenau (10)	3–0	FC Oberroedern (9)
17.	FC Hilsenheim (13)	2–3 (a.e.t.)	FC Stockfeld Colombes (12)
18.	AC Hinterfeld (12)	0–3	FC Drusenheim (9)
19.	FC Hoffen (12)	3–2	SC Roppenheim (9)
20.	AS Holtzheim (9)	1–0 (a.e.t.)	FC Breuschwickersheim (10)
21.	AS Hunspach (8)	2–4	AS Gundershoffen (8)
22.	US Oberschaeffolsheim (9)	0–2	US Ittenheim (8)
23.	FC Kertzfeld (13)	0–8	AS Hohwarth-St Pierre-Bois (9)
24.	FC Lampertheim (9)	1–0 (a.e.t.)	AS Gambsheim (9)
25.	FC Langensoultzbach (13)	0–1	AS Betschdorf (9)
26.	US Mietesheim (12)	0–2	AS Lauterbourg (10)
27.	LS Molsheim (8)	1–0	SR Furdenheim (8)
28.	ES Morsbronn-les-Bains (13)	0–5	FC Weitbruch (10)
29.	FC Neewiller (13)	0–6	US Turcs Bischwiller (8)
30.	FC Niederlauterbach (11)	2–3	FC Eschbach (9)
31.	AS Nordheim-Kuttolsheim (12)	0–2	CS Mars Bischheim (8)
32.	US Nordhouse (10)	3–1	AS Gerstheim (10)
33.	FC Oberhausbergen (11)	1–5	AS Mundolsheim (10)
34.	FC Oermingen (13)	1–2	FC Dossenheim-sur-Zinsel (11)
35.	AS Osthouse (13)	1–6	AS Westhouse (10)
36.	FC Phalsbourg (10)	3–2 (a.e.t.)	AS Lupstein (10)
37.	FC Rhinau (11)	2–0	FC Ostwald (10)
38.	ES Romanswiller (11)	1–0	SR Hoenheim (8)
39.	SR Rountzenheim-Auenheim (11)	2–4 (a.e.t.)	US Preuschdorf (9)
40.	FC Lixhausen (13)	1–3	US Ettendorf (11)
41.	ASB Schirmeck-La Broque (11)	0–1	US Hangenbieten (11)
42.	FC Sélestat (9)	1–2	AS Portugais Sélestat (10)
43.	CS Ste Croix-aux-Mines (12)	1–0	AS Natzwiller (12)
44.	FC Steinseltz (8)	2–2 (6–7 p)	FC Soultz-sous-Forêts/Kutzenhausen (8)
45.	AS Educative Cité de l'Ill (9)	1–2	AS Hoerdt (8)
46.	AS Électricité Strasbourg (11)	0–3	AS Bischoffsheim (8)
47.	SC Gaz de Strasbourg (13)	1–4	AS Mussig (10)
48.	AS Musau Strasbourg (13)	1–0	FC Boersch (11)
49.	US Wittersheim (11)	3–0 (a.e.t.)	AS Uhrwiller (12)
50.	FA Val de Moder (11)	3–1	AS Mertzwiller (11)
51.	FC Mackwiller (13)	1–3	US Trois Maisons (10)
52.	FC Wangen-Westhoffen (13)	2–7	AP Joie et Santé Strasbourg (9)
53.	AS Weinbourg (13)	1–2	FC Alteckendorf (11)
54.	AS Hochfelden (9)	3–2	FC Keskastel (10)
55.	US Wimmenau (11)	1–0	FC Schaffhouse-sur-Zorn (11)
56.	SR Zellwiller (12)	1–9	FC Still 1930 (8)
57.	FC Ballersdorf (8)	2–3	US Hirsingue (9)
58.	FC Bantzenheim (9)	2–1	FC Hagenthal-Wentzwiller (7)
59.	FC Battenheim (11)	2–2 (2–3 p)	FC Sausheim (9)
60.	US Pulversheim FC (10)	3–1	FC Bollwiller (12)
61.	AS Burnhaupt-le-Bas (10)	3–5	FC Bartenheim (8)
62.	AS Canton Vert (11)	0–7	FC Ostheim-Houssen (8)
63.	FC Ensisheim (12)	3–1	FC Soultz (11)
64.	FC Fessenheim (9)	4–0	FC Heiteren (10)
65.	US Gunsbach-Zimmerbach (10)	1–3	FC Merxheim (9)
66.	FC Habsheim (9)	2–1	SR St Amarin (8)
67.	AS Hagenbach-Buethwiller (10)	1–0	Montreux Sports (10)
68.	AS Munster (10)	1–2	FC Hirtzfelden (8)
69.	AS Hausgauen (10)	1–3	AS Altkirch (8)
70.	ASCCO Helfrantzkirch (11)	0–1	US Azzurri Mulhouse (9)
71.	FC Horbourg-Wihr (9)	1–1 (3–1 p)	FC Ste Croix-en-Plaine (9)
72.	FC Illfurth (9)	1–3	FC Pfastatt 1926 (8)
73.	FR Jebsheim-Muntzenheim (12)	3–1	FC Wolfgantzen (12)
74.	SR Kaysersberg (9)	2–1	Racing HW 96 (7)
75.	AS Lutterbach (10)	1–2	ASCA Wittelsheim (8)
76.	FC Morschwiller-le-Bas (9)	4–1	AS Aspach-le-Haut (10)
77.	ASPTT Mulhouse (11)	4–9	AS Blanc Vieux-Thann (8)
78.	FC Anatolie Mulhouse (10)	– (Note: both teams penalised. Neither progressed to the Third Round)	FC Sentheim (9)
79.	FC Lusitanos Mulhouse (12)	2–1	AS Red Star Mulhouse (10)
80.	RC Mulhouse (9)	2–3	SC Cernay (7)
81.	AS Pfaffenheim (10)	1–5	AS Raedersheim (8)
82.	US Pfetterhouse (12)	1–6	FC Kappelen (10)
83.	AS Rixheim (9)	0–3	FC Riedisheim (8)
84.	FC Rosenau (11)	2–1 (a.e.t.)	FC Obermorschwiller (10)
85.	FC Rouffach (12)	1–1 (4–2 p)	FC Niederhergheim (9)
86.	AS Schlierbach (10)	1–1 (4–3 p)	FC Reguisheim (10)
87.	AS Huningue (8)	4–2	FC Seppois (10)
88.	AS St Hippolyte (11)	0–0 (3–0 p)	AS Ober-Niederentzen (11)
89.	FC Steinbrunn-le-Bas (10)	0–4	AS Berrwiller-Hartsmannswiller (8)
90.	FC Traubach (11)	0–4	FC Kembs Réunis (8)
91.	SR Widensolen (12)	2–5 (a.e.t.)	FC Feldkirch (10)
92.	FC Wintzfelden-Osenbach (9)	3–1	FCI Riquewihr (10)
93.	FC Kogenheim (11)	0–2	US Scherwiller (9)
94.	US Dambach-la-Ville (12)	2–3	EB Achenheim (9)
95.	FC Dambach Neunhoffen (13)	0–3	FCO Strasbourg Koenigshoffen 06 (8)
96.	FC Entzheim (10)	0–3	AS Menora Strasbourg (8)
97.	FC Mothern (11)	3–2	AS Schœnenbourg (10)
98.	CS Strasbourg Neuhof (9)	1–1 (3–4 p)	FC Truchtersheim (10)
99.	AGIIR Florival (8)	0–2	AS Sundhoffen (7)
100.	FC Bennwihr (7)	2–1	FC Munchhouse (8)
101.	US Colmar (9)	2–7	FC Illhaeusern (7)
102.	Mouloudia Mulhouse (8)	3–0	US Wittenheim (7)
103.	CS Mulhouse Bourtzwiller (8)	4–2	FC Burnhaupt-le-Haut (7)
104.	Real Mulhouse CF (8)	0–1	ASL Kœtzingue (7)
105.	AS Raedersdorf (9)	1–3	AS Blotzheim (7)
106.	AS Ribeauville (9)	1–6	SR Colmar (7)
107.	FC Tagsdorf (10)	0–1	FC Uffheim (7)
108.	US Thann (9)	1–5	FC Sierentz (7)
109.	FC Wingersheim (10)	1–3	FC Souffelweyersheim (8)
110.	SC Ottmarsheim (9)	1–0	FC Hirtzbach (7)

=== Second round (Lorraine) ===
These matches were played between 21 and 24 August 2016.

Second round results: Lorraine

Tie no	Home team (tier)	Score	Away team (tier)
1.	AS Gérardmer (9)	3–1	FC Des Ballons (11)
2.	CS Thillotin (11)	0–1	AS Vageny (7)
3.	AS Cheniménil (12)	4–1	AS Ramonchamp (12)
4.	FC Ajolais (12)	2–1	AS Plombières (10)
5.	US Arches-Archettes-Raon (9)	2–0	FC Haute Moselotte (10)
6.	US Val de Saône (11)	0–3	AS Nomexy-Vincey (7)
7.	Bulgnéville Contrex Vittel FC (9)	3–0	US Lamarche (11)
8.	ES Aviere Darnieulles (11)	2–1	FC Remiremont (10)
9.	FC St Étienne-lès-Remiremont (11)	1–7	FC Ste Marguerite (10)
10.	SM Bruyères (12)	3–1	SR Fraize-Plainfaing (11)
11.	Dogneville FC (11)	0–2	FC Éloyes (8)
12.	FC Hadol-Dounoux (9)	1–2	ES Golbey (7)
13.	FC Revigny (11)	3–0	US Behonne/Longeville (10)
14.	US Russange (12)	1–7	ES Longuyon (10)
15.	FC Haironville (11)	2–3 (a.e.t.)	AS Tréveray (10)
16.	ES Badonviller-Celles (12)	3–0	US Fave (12)
17.	ASC Dompaire (12)	0–6	AS Girancourt-Dommartin-Chaumousey (8)
18.	SC Baccarat (10)	2–1	SM Taintrux (10)
19.	US Senones (11)	1–2	ASC Kellermann (9)
20.	FC Fains-Véel (10)	0–5	Entente Centre Ornain (9)
21.	GS Vézelise (12)	0–2	FC Neufchâteau-Liffol (9)
22.	ASL Coussey-Greux (10)	0–1	NG Touloise (12)
23.	AS Mouterhouse (10)	8–0	Olympique Mittelbronn 04 (11)
24.	ES Vallée de l'Othain St Jean/Marville (11)	2–0	AS Stenay-Mouzay (10)
25.	AS Entrange (11)	2–2 (5–6 p)	AS Portugais St Francois Thionville (9)
26.	FC Pierrefitte-sur-Aire (11)	2–2 (3–4 p)	ES Maizey-Lacroix (10)
27.	Entente Schorbach Hottviller Volmunster 13(11)	0–2	SO Ippling (8)
28.	US Thierville (10)	0–3	FC St Mihiel (8)
29.	FC Lemberg-St Louis (10)	1–5	US Soucht (8)
30.	AS Blâmont (10)	3–2	FC Hommert (10)
31.	Entente Petit-Rederching/Siersthal (11)	0–1	US Holving (11)
32.	US Spicheren (10)	3–1	ES Ormersviller-Epping (10)
33.	ES Tilly-Ambly Villers-Bouquemont (11)	0–1	SF Verdun Belleville (7)
34.	SR Langatte (12)	1–4	AS Réding (9)
35.	ES Bayon-Roville (11)	1–5	AC Blainville-Damelevières (8)
36.	US Schneckenbusch (10)	0–3	FC Sarrebourg (7)
37.	EF Turque Sarrebourg (8)	7–0	CS Diebling (10)
38.	AS Bliesbruck (10)	3–0	AS Le Val-de-Guéblange (10)
39.	Entente Neufgrange-Siltzheim (10)	2–3	Achen-Etting-Schmittviller (9)
40.	US Fénétrange-Mittersheim (11)	0–4	AS Bettborn Hellering (10)
41.	ES Avricourt Moussey (10)	1–0	FC St Max-Essey (9)
42.	Stade Flévillois (10)	3–0	FC Richardménil Flavigny Méréville Messein (10)
43.	GS Thiaucourt (11)	1–4 (a.e.t.)	Entente Sorcy Void-Vacon (8)
44.	Olympique Marbache Belleville Dieulouard (11)	2–7	SC Commercy (10)
45.	ES Laneuveville (11)	2–3	Maxéville FC (10)
46.	AS Rehainviller Hérimenil (10)	0–3	AS Ludres (8)
47.	AS Gondreville (10)	4–1	FC Toul (10)
48.	ASC Saulxures-lès-Nancy (10)	1–4	FC Dombasle-sur-Meurthe (8)
49.	FC Houdemont (10)	1–3	US Vandœuvre (7)
50.	Amicale de Chanteheux (11)	0–4	ES Heillecourt (7)
51.	MJC Pichon (10)	1–5	COS Villers (7)
52.	AS Haut-du-Lièvre Nancy (8)	2–1	ES Custines-Malleloy (8)
53.	ES Lunéville Sixte (10)	0–2	FC Pulnoy (8)
54.	FRFJ Lucy (12)	0–9	FC Dieuze (10)
55.	AJSE Montauville (12)	0–3	AS Lay-St Christophe/Bouxieres-aux-Dames (10)
56.	USL Mont St Martin (10)	0–1	FC Hayange (8)
57.	US Conflans (10)	1–3 (a.e.t.)	Entente Vigneulles-Hannonville-Fresne (8)
58.	US St Jean-Rohrbach (12)	1–4	ES Macheren Petit-Eversviller (9)
59.	FC Verrerie-Sophie (10)	4–0	ES Schœneck (12)
60.	AC Franco Turc Forbach (12)	3–2	FC L'Hôpital (9)
61.	US Morsbach (10)	1–3	AS Betting-Guenviller (11)
62.	ES Petite-Rosselle (9)	3–0 (Note: Tie won by means of forfeit.)	FC Vahl-Ebersing (11)
63.	ES Créhange-Faulquemont (10)	0–1	AS Morhange (8)
64.	FC Freyming (10)	1–2	US Behren-lès-Forbach (8)
65.	Excelsior Cuvry (10)	0–2	AS Montigny-lès-Metz (8)
66.	Fleury FC (12)	2–6	EF Delme-Solgne (10)
67.	FC Vœlfling (11)	2–1 (a.e.t.)	FC Folschviller (9)
68.	AS Anzeling-Edling (12)	0–9	SR Creutzwald 03 (8)
69.	Olympique Moutiers (12)	0–11	US Etain-Buzy (9)
70.	JS Bischwald (11)	0–3	JS Wenheck (9)
71.	JS Rémering-lès-Hargarten (11)	0–0 (3–4 p)	MJC Volmerange-lès-Boulay (9)
72.	CS Volmerange-les-Mines (11)	1–7	CS Godbrange (9)
73.	ESR Rémeling (10)	2–4	US Kœnigsmacker (8)
74.	US Volkrange (12)	0–3	JS Audunoise (9)
75.	CEP Kédange-sur-Canner (10)	1–2 (a.e.t.)	CA Boulay (7)
76.	JS Rettel-Hunting (10)	1–5	CS Veymerange (7)
77.	US Fontoy (10)	1–1 (2–3 p)	FC Bassin Piennois (7)
78.	JS Ancy-sur-Moselle (12)	2–9	FC Novéant (9)
79.	FC Bure (11)	0–1	AS Saulnes Longlaville (9)
80.	AS Sœtrich (11)	1–5	FC Yutz (7)
81.	USB Longwy (10)	1–4	FC Hettange-Grande (9)
82.	ASC Basse-Ham (10)	3–6	UL Rombas (7)
83.	US Yutz (10)	0–6	CS Homécourt (8)
84.	US Guentrange (11)	1–6	ES Fameck (7)
85.	SC Terville (10)	1–2	ES Marange-Silvange (9)
86.	US Marspich (10)	2–3	US Froidcul(9)
87.	FC Valleroy-Moinville (11)	0–6	RS Amanvillers (7)
88.	Cercle St Jean Augny (11)	1–5	FC Mondelange (9)
89.	US Châtel-St Germain (9)	2–2 (4–2 p)	JS Ars-Laquenexy (10)
90.	ENJ Val-de-Seille (11)	1–2 (a.e.t.)	SC Marly (9)
91.	AS Ars-sur-Moselle (10)	0–3	FC Devant-les-Ponts Metz (9)
92.	AJ Aubouésienne (11)	3–0 (Note: USAG Uckange won the tie 6–0, but were subsequently penalised and AJ Aubouésienne progressed to the Third Round)	USAG Uckange (8)
93.	AS Volstroff (10)	1–4	ES Jœuf (8)
94.	ES Gandrange (9)	2–1	AS Clouange (8)
95.	AS Ay-sur-Moselle (12)	2–6 (a.e.t.)	SC Moulins-lès-Metz (11)
96.	AS Hauconcourt (11)	1–5	FC Hagondange (7)
97.	FC Guénange (11)	2–3	ES Woippy (11)
98.	RS La Maxe (10)	1–2	ES Metz (8)
99.	US Ban-St Martin (10)	3–2	AS St Julien-lès-Metz (9)
100.	ES Maizières (10)	0–2	UL Plantieres Metz (7)
101.	SS Seingbouse-Henriville (12)	1–9	SO Merlebach (8)
102.	US Boulange (10)	0–2	ES Villerupt-Thil (7)
103.	US Mirecourt-Hymont (11)	1–3 (a.e.t.)	GS Haroué-Benney (8)
104.	ES Gros Rederching-Bettviller (10)	4–5	AS Hellimer (10)
105.	FC Rohrbach-Bining (10)	1–2	US Nousseviller (8)

=== Second round (Champagne-Ardenne) ===
These matches were played on 28 August 2016.

Second round results: Champagne-Ardenne

Tie no	Home team (tier)	Score	Away team (tier)
1.	AS Neuville-lès-This (9)	1–2	OFC Charleville (7)
2.	FC Blagny-Carignan (9)	0–2 (a.e.t.)	USA Le Chesne (7)
3.	US Flize (11)	2–2 (5–3 p)	Olympique Torcy-Sedan (7)
4.	US Deux Vireux (8)	1–2	CA Villers-Semeuse (7)
5.	AS Bourg-Rocroi (9)	2–1	FC Bogny (8)
6.	FC Porcien (10)	2–0	AS Tournes/Renwez/Les Mazures/Arreux/Montcornet (8)
7.	JS Remilly-Aillicourt (10)	3–1	Floing FC (10)
8.	Cheveuges-St Aignan CO (10)	0–6	Le Theux FC (8)
9.	Sormonne SL (10)	0–3	USC Nouvion-sur-Meuse (8)
10.	AS Asfeld (8)	8–0	QV Douzy (8)
11.	FC Maubert-Fontaine (11)	1–1 (4–3 p)	FC Haybes (11)
12.	FC Allobais Doncherois (8)	3–1	AS Lumes (10)
13.	Olympique Chapelain (9)	0–6	RCS La Chapelle (7)
14.	Étoile Lusigny (11)	1–2	Étoile Chapelaine (7)
15.	Bar-sur-Aube FC (8)	0–5	Aube Sud Vanne Pays D'Othe (7)
16.	FC Vallant/Les Grès (9)	1–2	JS St Julien FC (7)
17.	ESC Melda (8)	3–0	US Vendeuvre (8)
18.	CS Trois Vallées (9)	1–9	AFM Romilly (8)
19.	ES Municipaux Troyes (8)	4–0	US Maizières-Chatres (9)
20.	Renouveau Ramerupt (10)	0–1	SC Savières (10)
21.	FC Europort (10)	0–3	CS Agéen (7)
22.	ES Fagnières (9)	0–3	ASPTT Châlons (7)
23.	Foyer Compertrix (11)	1–2	Châlons FCO (7)
24.	FC Christo (8)	0–2	Nord Champagne FC (7)
25.	SC Montmirail (10)	0–4	RC Sézanne (7)
26.	FC Pargny-sur-Saulx (10)	0–4	Argonne FC (7)
27.	AS St Brice-Courcelles (10)	2–1	AS Taissy (7)
28.	AS Cernay-Berru-Lavannes (8)	3–4	SC Tinqueux (7)
29.	FC Côte des Blancs (8)	7–2	Vitry FC (7)
30.	US Dizy (10)	0–3	US Avize-Grauves (8)
31.	US Fismes (9)	2–1 (a.e.t.)	SC de la Suippe (10)
32.	US Couvrot (10)	3–1	SC Dormans (9)
33.	AS Mourmelon-Livry-Bouy (11)	2–1	FCF La Neuvillette (9)
34.	AS Marolles (10)	1–4	Entente Somsois/Margerie/St Utin (10)
35.	FC Prez Bourmont (9)	0–3 (Note: FC Prez Bourmont penalised for a technical infringement. ES Andelot-Rimaucourt-Bourdons progress to the third round.)	ES Andelot-Rimaucort-Bourdons (7)
36.	FC CS Bragard (9)	0–8	SC Marnaval (7)
37.	AS Lasarjonc (10)	1–3	FC Sts-Geosmois (7)
38.	US Biesles (10)	1–2	USI Blaise (7)
39.	Foyer Bayard (11)	0–4	ASPTT Chaumont (8)
40.	US Bourbonnaise (9)	0–4	US Fayl-Billot/Hortes (8)
41.	CS Villiers-en-Lieu (9)	4–2	CO Langres (8)
42.	Stade Chevillonais (9)	0–1	US Montier-en-Der (8)
43.	SL Ornel (8)	6–6 (3–2 p)	AS Sarrey-Montigny (8)
44.	CA Rolampontais (9)	2–4	SR Neuilly-l'Évêque (9)
45.	IFA Chaumontaise (11)	3–1	DS Eurville-Bienville (8)
46.	ES Connantre-Corroy (11)	1–4	FC Sillery (9)
47.	USS Sermaize (10)	0–1	FC Turcs Épernay (9)

== Third round ==
=== Third round (Alsace) ===
These matches were played on 10 and 11 September 2016.

Third round results: Alsace

Tie no	Home team (tier)	Score	Away team (tier)
1.	FC Ernolsheim-lès-Saverne (12)	2–6	FC Weitbruch (10)
2.	AS Hohwarth-St Pierre-Bois (9)	1–2	FC Soleil Bischheim (6)
3.	FC Bantzenheim (9)	1–0	ASL Kœtzingue (7)
4.	SR Colmar (7)	2–3	SC Cernay (7)
5.	FC Riedisheim (8)	3–0	AS Huningue (8)
6.	EB Achenheim (9)	0–4	US Sarre-Union (5)
7.	ASI Avenir (7)	1–2 (a.e.t.)	FC Kronenbourg Strasbourg (6)
8.	US Baldenheim (9)	2–0 (a.e.t.)	ASL Robertsau (7)
9.	SS Beinheim (11)	1–4	US Preuschdorf (9)
10.	AS Bergbieten (7)	3–5	AS Mundolsheim (10)
11.	AS Betschdorf (9)	0–1	FC St Etienne Seltz (7)
12.	US Dachstein (11)	1–2	AS Bischoffsheim (8)
13.	FC Dossenheim-sur-Zinsel (11)	3–1	US Ettendorf (11)
14.	FC Drusenheim (9)	2–6	FCE Schirrhein (6)
15.	FC Durrenbach (10)	1–0	US Wittersheim (11)
16.	US Eckwersheim (11)	1–4	AS Mutzig (8)
17.	FC Eschbach (9)	1–1 (4–3 p)	AS Hochfelden (9)
18.	FC Geispolsheim 01 (7)	0–1	FCSR Obernai (6)
19.	Fatih-Sport Haguenau (10)	2–5	AS Gundershoffen (8)
20.	US Hangenbieten (11)	3–0	AS Mussig (10)
21.	FC Herbsheim (11)	0–9	SC Schiltigheim (5)
22.	FC Hoffen (12)	0–3	US Oberlauterbach (6)
23.	FC Lampertheim (9)	2–3	SC Drulingen (7)
24.	AS Lauterbourg (10)	2–4	FC Mothern (11)
25.	OC Lipsheim (11)	4–2	US Scherwiller (9)
26.	LS Molsheim (8)	1–4	FC Rossfeld (7)
27.	US Nordhouse (10)	5–1	AS Holtzheim (9)
28.	AS Portugais Sélestat (10)	1–0	US Ittenheim (8)
29.	FC Riedseltz (10)	5–3 (a.e.t.)	AS Ohlungen (7)
30.	ES Romanswiller (11)	0–2	AP Joie et Santé Strasbourg (9)
31.	CS Ste Croix-aux-Mines (12)	0–1	ALFC Duttlenheim (8)
32.	FC Stockfeld Colombes (12)	2–1	SC Dinsheim (6)
33.	AS Musau Strasbourg (13)	0–2	AS Erstein (6)
34.	FCO Strasbourg Koenigshoffen 06 (8)	5–1	US Turcs Bischwiller (8)
35.	FC Truchtersheim (10)	1–4	FA Illkirch Graffenstaden (6)
36.	FA Val de Moder (11)	0–4	AS Hoerdt (8)
37.	SS Weyersheim (7)	1–2	FCSR Haguenau (5)
38.	AS Willgottheim (11)	0–7	FC Soultz-sous-Forêts/Kutzenhausen (8)
39.	US Wimmenau (11)	0–5	FC Saverne (7)
40.	FC Dahlenheim (10)	1–0	FC Souffelweyersheim (8)
41.	FC Bartenheim (8)	2–0	FC Uffheim (7)
42.	AS Berrwiller-Hartsmannswiller (8)	0–4	ASC Biesheim (5)
43.	FC Ensisheim (12)	0–7	FC Bennwihr (7)
44.	FC Feldkirch (10)	0–5	SR Kaysersberg (9)
45.	AS Hagenbach-Buethwiller (10)	1–5	AS Blotzheim (7)
46.	SC Ottmarsheim (9)	0–3	FC Hégenheim (6)
47.	US Hirsingue (9)	1–2	FC Sierentz (7)
48.	FC Hirtzfelden (8)	1–1 (4–2 p)	Mouloudia Mulhouse (8)
49.	FC Horbourg-Wihr (9)	3–4	FC Illhaeusern (7)
50.	FR Jebsheim-Muntzenheim (12)	1–4	FC Ostheim-Houssen (8)
51.	AS Mertzen (9)	1–0	FC Habsheim (9)
52.	US Azzurri Mulhouse (9)	2–3	AS Illzach Modenheim (5)
53.	FC Lusitanos Mulhouse (12)	0–3	FC Kappelen (10)
54.	US Pulversheim FC (10)	1–6	FC Kingersheim (6)
55.	AS Raedersheim (8)	3–1	FC Wintzfelden-Osenbach (9)
56.	FC Rosenau (11)	0–2	FC Kembs Réunis (8)
57.	FC Rouffach (12)	1–2	FC Morschwiller-le-Bas (9)
58.	AS Schlierbach (10)	1–6	AS Altkirch (8)
59.	AS St Hippolyte (11)	0–1	FC Merxheim (9)
60.	ASCA Wittelsheim (8)	3–2 (a.e.t.)	FC Pfastatt 1926 (8)
61.	SC Dettwiller (12)	0–3	US Trois Maisons (10)
62.	FC Phalsbourg (10)	2–3 (a.e.t.)	US Reipertswiller (6)
63.	AS Sundhoffen (7)	6–2	AS Blanc Vieux-Thann (8)
64.	FC Sausheim (9)	3–5	FC Fessenheim (9)
65.	FC Alteckendorf (11)	0–3	FC Obermodern (7)
66.	CS Mars Bischheim (8)	4–0	AS Elsau Portugais Strasbourg (7)
67.	AS Ernolsheim-sur-Bruche (7)	1–3 (a.e.t.)	AS Menora Strasbourg (8)
68.	AS Westhouse (10)	3–0	FC Rhinau (11)
69.	FC Still 1930 (8)	0–4	ASPV Strasbourg (5)

=== Third round (Lorraine) ===
These matches were played on 10 and 11 September 2016.

Third round results: Lorraine

Tie no	Home team (tier)	Score	Away team (tier)
1.	SC Commercy (10)	0–9	US Pagny-sur-Moselle (5)
2.	US Soucht (8)	2–1	SO Ippling (8)
3.	AS Montigny-lès-Metz (8)	3–1	FC Devant-les-Ponts Metz (9)
4.	CA Boulay (7)	1–2	SR Creutzwald 03 (8)
5.	ES Petite-Rosselle (9)	0–3	Sarreguemines FC (5)
6.	US Nousseviller (8)	3–0	ES Heillecourt (7)
7.	SC Moulins-lès-Metz (11)	0–6	CSO Amnéville (6)
8.	ES Longuyon (10)	3–0	JS Audunoise (9)
9.	CS Godbrange (9)	2–3 (a.e.t.)	ES Villerupt-Thil (7)
10.	FC Hayange (8)	1–2	AS Saulnes Longlaville (9)
11.	AS Portugais St Francois Thionville (9)	2–1	CS Veymerange (7)
12.	CS Homécourt (8)	3–2	Thionville FC (6)
13.	US Ban-St Martin (10)	8–0	ES Vallée de l'Othain St Jean/Marville (11)
14.	ES Woippy (11)	0–2	FC Bassin Piennois (7)
15.	ES Jœuf (8)	0–2	FC Trémery (6)
16.	FC Hettange-Grande (9)	2–3	FC Yutz (7)
17.	FC Vœlfling (11)	1–4 (a.e.t.)	ES Fameck (7)
18.	AS Lay-St Christophe/Bouxieres-aux-Dames (10)	0–2	FC Hagondange (7)
19.	ES Gandrange (9)	3–2	UL Rombas (7)
20.	AS Betting-Guenviller (11)	0–5	APM Metz (6)
21.	FC Dieuze (10)	1–0	EF Delme-Solgne (10)
22.	ES Metz (8)	7–2	US Froidcul (9)
23.	SO Merlebach (8)	0–3	Étoile Naborienne St Avold (6)
24.	AS Bettborn Hellering (10)	1–2	FC Mondelange (9)
25.	ES Marange-Silvange (9)	1–4	US Behren-lès-Forbach (8)
26.	MJC Volmerange-lès-Boulay (9)	2–1	ES Macheren Petit-Eversviller (9)
27.	FC Verrerie-Sophie (10)	0–4	US Forbach (5)
28.	UL Plantieres Metz (7)	6–2	JS Wenheck (9)
29.	AS Hellimer (10)	0–8	RS Magny (6)
30.	AC Franco Turc Forbach (12)	1–3	US Spicheren (10)
31.	NG Touloise (12)	0–3	AS Ludres (8)
32.	ES Maizey-Lacroix (10)	1–2	FC St Mihiel (8)
33.	US Etain-Buzy (9)	2–1 (a.e.t.)	SF Verdun Belleville (7)
34.	AS Gondreville (10)	2–1	Bar-le-Duc FC (6)
35.	FC Neufchâteau-Liffol (9)	1–0	RS Amanvillers (7)
36.	FC Revigny (11)	0–2	Entente Centre Ornain (9)
37.	Entente Sorcy Void-Vacon (8)	0–1	CS&O Blénod-Pont-à-Mousson (7)
38.	AS Tréveray (10)	0–0 (3–1 p)	Entente Vigneulles-Hannonville-Fresne (8)
39.	ES Golbey (7)	2–0 (a.e.t.)	AS Nomexy-Vincey (7)
40.	FC Éloyes (8)	1–3	AS Gérardmer (9)
41.	FC Ajolais (12)	3–1	SC Baccarat (10)
42.	FC Ste Marguerite (10)	0–6	ES Thaon (6)
43.	US Arches-Archettes-Raon (9)	2–1	Bulgnéville Contrex Vittel FC (9)
44.	AS Vagney (7)	3–0	GS Haroué-Benney (8)
45.	AS Girancourt-Dommartin-Chaumousey (8)	3–0 (Note: The game between AS Girancourt-Dommartin-Chaumousey and ASC Kellermann was abandoned by the referee with the score 2–2 after an incident between players of the two teams. ASC Kellermann were subsequently penalised for the actions of one of their players, and AS Girancourt-Dommartin-Chaumousey progressed to the Fourth round)	ASC Kellermann (9)
46.	AS Cheniménil (12)	0–3	SR Saint-Dié (6)
47.	SM Bruyères (12)	1–2 (a.e.t.)	ES Aviere Darnieulles (11)
48.	Stade Flévillois (10)	0–4	AC Blainville-Damelevières (8)
49.	FC Dombasle-sur-Meurthe (8)	1–3 (a.e.t.)	FC Pulnoy (8)
50.	Maxéville FC (10)	3–3 (0–3 p)	GS Neuves-Maisons (6)
51.	US Châtel-St Germain (9)	0–5	FC Lunéville (5)
52.	US Vandœuvre (7)	2–1	AS Haut-du-Lièvre Nancy (8)
53.	SC Marly (9)	1–2	RC Champigneulles (6)
54.	ES Badonviller-Celles (12)	1–2	AS Blâmont (10)
55.	FC Novéant (9)	0–2	COS Villers (7)
56.	US Holving (11)	2–7	FC Sarrebourg (7)
57.	AS Morhange (8)	1–2	Jarville JF (6)
58.	ES Avricourt Moussey (10)	1–7	EF Turque Sarrebourg (8)
59.	AS Réding (9)	2–1	AS Bliesbruck (10)
60.	AJ Aubouésienne (11)	2–4	US Kœnigsmacker (8)
61.	Achen-Etting-Schmittviller (9)	0–0 (4–5 p)	AS Mouterhouse (10)

=== Third round (Champagne-Ardenne) ===
These matches were played on 10 and 11 September 2016.

Third round results: Champagne-Ardenne

Tie no	Home team (tier)	Score	Away team (tier)
1.	US Avize-Grauves (8)	0–5	RC Épernay Champagne (6)
2.	AS Bourg-Rocroi (9)	1–2	AS Prix-lès-Mézières (5)
3.	FC Maubert-Fontaine (11)	0–1	AS Asfeld (8)
4.	Rethel SF (6)	2–1	USA Le Chesne (7)
5.	FC Porcien (10)	0–1	Nord Champagne FC (7)
6.	Le Theux FC (8)	7–2	US Flize (11)
7.	CA Villers-Semeuse (7)	6–2	US Bazeilles (6)
8.	OFC Charleville (7)	3–0	FC Allobais Doncherois (8)
9.	USC Nouvion-sur-Meuse (8)	0–1	JS Remilly-Aillicourt (10)
10.	RCS La Chapelle (7)	0–0 (5–4 p)	Aube Sud Vanne Pays D'Othe (7)
11.	Entente Somsois/Margerie/St Utin (10)	2–4 (a.e.t.)	ES Municipaux Troyes (8)
12.	FC St Mesmin (6)	2–2 (7–6 p)	FC Nogentais (6)
13.	JS St Julien FC (7)	4–1	SC Savières (10)
14.	RC Sézanne (7)	4–1	ESC Melda (8)
15.	US Couvrot (10)	2–1	Étoile Chapelaine (7)
16.	AFM Romilly (8)	1–2 (a.e.t.)	FCA Troyes (6)
17.	US Fismes (9)	2–3	Argonne FC (7)
18.	AS Mourmelon-Livry-Bouy (11)	0–2	CS Agéen (7)
19.	ASPTT Châlons (7)	8–1	FC Côte des Blancs (8)
20.	EF Reims Sainte-Anne Châtillons (6)	1–2	MJEP Cormontreuil (6)
21.	AS St Brice-Courcelles (10)	0–6	SA Sézanne (6)
22.	Châlons FCO (7)	0–1	SC Tinqueux (7)
23.	FC Turcs Épernay (9)	1–2	FC Sillery (9)
24.	IFA Chaumontaise (11)	1–2	US Montier-en-Der (8)
25.	SR Neuilly-l'Évêque (9)	0–3	Foyer Barsequannais (6)
26.	US Fayl-Billot/Hortes (8)	1–2	SC Marnaval (7)
27.	ASPTT Chaumont (8)	1–0	ES Andelot-Rimaucort-Bourdons (7)
28.	USI Blaise (7)	2–2 (4–2 p)	SL Ornel (8)
29.	CS Villiers-en-Lieu (9)	0–2	Chaumont FC (6)
30.	US Éclaron (6)	4–1	FC Sts-Geosmois (7)

== Fourth round ==
=== Fourth round (Alsace) ===
These matches were played on 24 and 25 September 2016.

Fourth round results: Alsace

Tie no	Home team (tier)	Score	Away team (tier)
1.	US Oberlauterbach (6)	2–0	FC Obermodern (7)
2.	FCSR Haguenau (5)	2–1	SC Schiltigheim (5)
3.	FC Morschwiller-le-Bas (9)	2–6	FC Saint-Louis Neuweg (4)
4.	FC Bantzenheim (9)	4–0	CS Mulhouse Bourtzwiller (8)
5.	FC Saverne (7)	1–0	FCO Strasbourg Koenigshoffen 06 (8)
6.	FC Bennwihr (7)	0–2	AS Illzach Modenheim (5)
7.	US Baldenheim (9)	1–2	FC Rossfeld (7)
8.	FC Dossenheim-sur-Zinsel (11)	1–2	US Preuschdorf (9)
9.	US Hangenbiete (11)	2–8	FCSR Obernai (6)
10.	FC Mothern (11)	0–2	FC Soultz-sous-Forêts/Kutzenhausen (8)
11.	AS Mundolsheim (10)	2–3 (a.e.t.)	AS Hoerdt (8)
12.	AS Mutzig (8)	0–2	FA Illkirch Graffenstaden (6)
13.	US Nordhouse (10)	1–2	OC Lipsheim (11)
14.	FC Riedseltz (10)	0–2	SC Drulingen (7)
15.	FCE Schirrhein (6)	0–7	ASPV Strasbourg (5)
16.	AS Portugais Sélestat (10)	0–9	FC Kronenbourg Strasbourg (6)
17.	AP Joie et Santé Strasbourg (9)	1–1 (4–5 p)	AS Bischoffsheim (8)
18.	FC Stockfeld Colombes (12)	0–7	AS Erstein (6)
19.	US Trois Maisons (10)	0–1	FC Eschbach (9)
20.	FC Weitbruch (10)	1–5	FC Soleil Bischheim (6)
21.	AS Westhouse (10)	0–4	AS Menora Strasbourg (8)
22.	AS Altkirch (8)	0–4	FC Bartenheim (8)
23.	SC Cernay (7)	1–0 (a.e.t.)	FC Riedisheim (8)
24.	FC Durrenbach (10)	0–2	FC St Etienne Seltz (7)
25.	AS Sundhoffen (7)	1–3 (a.e.t.)	ASC Biesheim (5)
26.	FC Hirtzfelden (8)	0–2	ASCA Wittelsheim (8)
27.	FC Kappelen (10)	2–2 (4–3 p)	FC Kembs Réunis (8)
28.	SR Kaysersberg (9)	4–1 (a.e.t.)	AS Mertzen (9)
29.	FC Merxheim (9)	0–4	FC Mulhouse (4)
30.	FC Ostheim-Houssen (8)	1–3	FC Kingersheim (6)
31.	AS Raedersheim (8)	1–0	FC Hégenheim (6)
32.	FC Sierentz (7)	3–1	AS Blotzheim (7)
33.	FC Dahlenheim (10)	1–0	ALFC Duttlenheim (8)
34.	AS Gundershoffen (8)	2–2 (4–5 p)	US Reipertswiller (6)
35.	FC Fessenheim (9)	2–4 (a.e.t.)	FC Illhaeusern (7)
36.	CS Mars Bischheim (8)	1–4	US Sarre-Union (5)

=== Fourth round (Lorraine) ===
These matches were played on 24 and 25 September 2016.

Fourth round results: Lorraine

Tie no	Home team (tier)	Score	Away team (tier)
1.	FC Lunéville (5)	2–1	ES Thaon (6)
2.	US Nousseviller (8)	2–1	Étoile Naborienne St Avold (6)
3.	FC St Mihiel (8)	0–2	GS Neuves-Maisons (6)
4.	US Forbach (5)	1–4	RS Magny (6)
5.	US Kœnigsmacker (8)	1–3	ES Metz (8)
6.	SR Creutzwald 03 (8)	3–1	US Etain-Buzy (9)
7.	ES Longuyon (10)	0–2	ES Fameck (7)
8.	US Ban-St Martin (10)	1–1 (5–4 p)	FC Bassin Piennois (7)
9.	AS Portugais St Francois Thionville (9)	4–2	ES Villerupt-Thil (7)
10.	AS Saulnes Longlaville (9)	1–4	CS Homécourt (8)
11.	FC Trémery (6)	2–1 (a.e.t.)	CSO Amnéville (6)
12.	MJC Volmerange-lès-Boulay (9)	2–0	AS Réding (9)
13.	US Soucht (8)	1–7	APM Metz (6)
14.	US Spicheren (10)	1–2	ES Gandrange (9)
15.	FC Hagondange (7)	1–1 (2–4 p)	Sarreguemines FC (5)
16.	FC Dieuze (10)	1–4	EF Turque Sarrebourg (8)
17.	US Behren-lès-Forbach (8)	2–1	FC Yutz (7)
18.	CS&O Blénod-Pont-à-Mousson (7)	2–1	UL Plantieres Metz (7)
19.	Entente Centre Ornain (9)	7–1	AS Blâmont (10)
20.	AS Tréveray (10)	0–5	US Pagny-sur-Moselle (5)
21.	AS Montigny-lès-Metz (8)	1–4	US Vandœuvre (7)
22.	FC Mondelange (9)	1–0	FC Neufchâteau-Liffol (9)
23.	AS Gondreville (10)	2–4	Jarville JF (6)
24.	FC Pulnoy (8)	0–1	RC Champigneulles (6)
25.	AS Gérardmer (9)	0–1 (a.e.t.)	COS Villers (7)
26.	FC Ajolais (12)	1–1 (4–5 p)	AS Vagney (7)
27.	US Arches-Archettes-Raon (9)	0–5	ES Golbey (7)
28.	ES Aviere Darnieulles (11)	1–3	AC Blainville-Damelevières (8)
29.	AS Ludres (8)	0–3	SR Saint-Dié (6)
30.	AS Girancourt-Dommartin-Chaumousey (8)	2–7	US Raon-l'Étape (4)
31.	AS Mouterhouse (10)	5–6 (a.e.t.)	FC Sarrebourg (7)

=== Fourth round (Champagne-Ardenne) ===
These matches were played on 25 September 2016.

Fourth round results: Champagne-Ardenne

Tie no	Home team (tier)	Score	Away team (tier)
1.	AS Asfeld (8)	1–5	Rethel SF (6)
2.	RC Épernay Champagne (6)	6–2	OFC Charleville (7)
3.	Nord Champagne FC (7)	1–1 (4–5 p)	SC Tinqueux (7)
4.	FC Sillery (9)	0–1	CS Agéen (7)
5.	AS Prix-lès-Mézières (5)	6–1	MJEP Cormontreuil (6)
6.	CA Villers-Semeuse (7)	5–5 (5–4 p)	ASPTT Châlons (7)
7.	Le Theux FC (8)	0–4	SA Sézanne (6)
8.	JS Remilly-Aillicourt (10)	0–2	Argonne FC (7)
9.	JS St Julien FC (7)	7–0	ASPTT Chaumont (8)
10.	US Couvrot (10)	0–4	SC Marnaval (7)
11.	Foyer Barsequannais (6)	2–0	USI Blaise (7)
12.	Chaumont FC (6)	4–1	RCS La Chapelle (7)
13.	US Montier-en-Der (8)	0–2	ES Municipaux Troyes (8)
14.	FCA Troyes (6)	3–2	US Éclaron (6)
15.	RC Sézanne (7)	2–6	FC St Mesmin (6)

== Fifth round ==
=== Fifth round (Alsace) ===
These matches were played on 7, 8 and 9 October 2016.

Fifth round results: Alsace

Tie no	Home team (tier)	Score	Away team (tier)
1.	FC Mulhouse (4)	2–0	FC Saint-Louis Neuweg (4)
2.	FC Soleil Bischheim (6)	2–0	SC Drulingen (7)
3.	FC Saverne (7)	0–4	AS Illzach Modenheim (5)
4.	FC Sierentz (7)	1–0	ASPV Strasbourg (5)
5.	FC Illhaeusern (7)	2–1	SC Cernay (7)
6.	FC Bantzenheim (9)	1–3	US Sarre-Union (5)
7.	FC Eschbach (9)	0–0 (3–5 p)	FC Bartenheim (8)
8.	AS Hoerdt (8)	0–0 (0–2 p)	SR Kaysersberg (9)
9.	FC Kappelen (10)	1–3	FC Dahlenheim (10)
10.	FC Kingersheim (6)	3–4 (a.e.t.)	US Oberlauterbach (6)
11.	OC Lipsheim (11)	1–4	FC Kronenbourg Strasbourg (6)
12.	AS Menora Strasbourg (8)	3–0	AS Bischoffsheim (8)
13.	FCSR Obernai (6)	0–2	FCSR Haguenau (5)
14.	AS Raedersheim (8)	3–5 (a.e.t.)	AS Erstein (6)
15.	FC Rossfeld (7)	1–3	ASC Biesheim (5)
16.	FC St Etienne Seltz (7)	0–2	US Reipertswiller (6)
17.	ASCA Wittelsheim (8)	0–0 (4–3 p)	FA Illkirch Graffenstaden (6)
18.	US Preuschdorf (9)	0–3	FC Soultz-sous-Forêts/Kutzenhausen (8)

=== Fifth round (Lorraine) ===
These matches were played on 8 and 9 October 2016.

Fifth round results: Lorraine

Tie no	Home team (tier)	Score	Away team (tier)
1.	CS&O Blénod-Pont-à-Mousson (7)	1–7	US Raon-l'Étape (4)
2.	APM Metz (6)	0–0 (8–7 p)	FC Trémery (6)
3.	US Behren-lès-Forbach (8)	2–1	US Nousseviller (8)
4.	AS Portugais St Francois Thionville (9)	0–1	Sarreguemines FC (5)
5.	ES Fameck (7)	1–1 (4–2 p)	US Vandœuvre (7)
6.	SR Creutzwald 03 (8)	4–3 (a.e.t.)	RS Magny (6)
7.	CS Homécourt (8)	7–1	MJC Volmerange-lès-Boulay (9)
8.	US Ban-St Martin (10)	1–4	EF Turque Sarrebourg (8)
9.	COS Villers (7)	2–0	RC Champigneulles (6)
10.	GS Neuves-Maisons (6)	1–2	FC Sarrebourg (7)
11.	AS Vagney (7)	0–2	Jarville JF (6)
12.	ES Golbey (7)	0–5	SAS Épinal (3)
13.	AC Blainville-Damelevières (8)	0–2 (a.e.t.)	Entente Centre Ornain (9)
14.	ES Metz (8)	0–1	FC Mondelange (9)
15.	SR Saint-Dié (6)	0–2	FC Lunéville (5)
16.	ES Gandrange (9)	0–3	US Pagny-sur-Moselle (5)

=== Fifth round (Champagne-Ardenne) ===
These matches were played on 8 and 9 October 2016.

Fifth round results: Champagne-Ardenne

Tie no	Home team (tier)	Score	Away team (tier)
1.	Rethel SF (6)	0–1	RC Épernay Champagne (6)
2.	ES Municipaux Troyes (8)	0–8	CS Sedan Ardennes (3)
3.	Chaumont FC (6)	2–1	JS St Julien FC (7)
4.	CS Agéen (7)	0–3	SA Sézanne (6)
5.	SC Marnaval (7)	0–1	SC Tinqueux (7)
6.	Argonne FC (7)	2–6	AS Prix-lès-Mézières (5)
7.	Foyer Barsequannais (6)	1–0	FCA Troyes (6)
8.	FC St Mesmin (6)	5–1	CA Villers-Semeuse (7)
