= 2017–18 Coupe de France preliminary rounds, Grand Est =

The 2017–18 Coupe de France preliminary rounds, Grand-Est make up the qualifying competition to decide which teams from the French Grand-Est region take part in the main competition from the seventh round.

== First round ==
The first round qualifiers for the regional league of Grand Est were organised separately by the three constituent sectors.

=== Alsace ===
The matches in Alsace were played between 12 and 17 August 2017.

First round results: Alsace

Tie no	Home team (tier)	Score	Away team (tier)
1.	FC Dossenheim-sur-Zinsel (11)	5–3 (a.e.t.)	US Wimmenau (11)
2.	US Scherwiller (9)	6–0	US Innenheim (10)
3.	FC Ostwald (10)	0–3	CS Fegersheim (9)
4.	FC Bindernheim (11)	0–3	SC Ebersheim (9)
5.	AS Heiligenstein (11)	0–4	US Baldenheim (9)
6.	FC Kertzfeld (13)	9–1	FC Sand (13)
7.	AS Niedernai (12)	6–2	AS Elsenheim (12)
8.	AS Marckolsheim (12)	2–3	AS Portugais Sélestat (9)
9.	OC Lipsheim (10)	9–1	FC Wittisheim (11)
10.	AS Schœnau (12)	2–0	CA Plobsheim (12)
11.	US Dambach-la-Ville/Nothalten (12)	0–3	CS Ste Croix-aux-Mines (11)
12.	FC Hilsenheim (12)	1–0	FC Eschau (9)
13.	AS Osthouse (12)	0–9	US Hindisheim (8)
14.	FC Sélestat (9)	3–0	AS Mussig (10)
15.	US Meistratzheim (13)	2–1	AS St Pierre-Bois/Triembah-au-Val (10)
16.	AS Benfeld (13)	0–7	AS Gerstheim (10)
17.	AS Villé 2010 (12)	3–2	FC Boofzheim (12)
18.	FC Artolsheim (11)	8–3	US Sundhouse (12)
19.	FC Valff (13)	1–4	FC Entzheim (10)
20.	SC Gaz de Strasbourg (12)	1–5	US Nordhouse (9)
21.	FC Herbsheim (11)	1–4	AS Sermersheim (9)
22.	UJ Epfig (11)	5–2	ES Stotzheim (11)
23.	FC Matzenheim (12)	0–4	FC Rossfeld (8)
24.	FC Ebersmunster (15)	2–6	FC Krautergersheim (11)
25.	FC Rhinau (10)	6–1	FC Kogenheim (11)
26.	AS Musau Strasbourg (12)	10–1	FC Hipsheim (13)
27.	AS Bischoffsheim (8)	1–0	CS Bernardswiller (13)
28.	AS Natzwiller (11)	3–0	SR Dorlisheim (12)
29.	Strasbourg Université Club (11)	1–0	RC Kintzheim (10)
30.	US Hangenbieten (12)	0–5	LS Molsheim (8)
31.	USL Duppigheim (10)	1–0	FC Grendelbruch (12)
32.	ES Haslach-Urmatt (13)	3–6 (a.e.t.)	AS Mutzig (8)
33.	FC Rosheim (11)	3–5	FC Boersch (11)
34.	FC Barr (12)	0–1	AS Altorf (12)
35.	FC Lingolsheim (11)	1–0 (a.e.t.)	AS Wisches-Russ-Lutzelhouse (10)
36.	AS Électricité Strasbourg (11)	1–4	AS Neudorf (9)
37.	AS Portugais Barembach-Bruche (12)	0–2	ASB Schirmeck-La Broque (11)
38.	FR Sessenheim-Stattmatten (10)	1–0	SS Beinheim (11)
39.	FC Riedseltz/Rott (10)	5–0	FC Altenstadt/Wissembourg (11)
40.	FC Oberroedern/Aschbach (10)	4–0	AS Seebach (11)
41.	SC Rœschwoog (10)	0–5	FC Steinseltz (8)
42.	AS Hatten (12)	3–2	SR Rountzenheim-Auenheim (11)
43.	US Dalhunden (12)	2–4	FC Scheibenhard (11)
44.	ES Offendorf (12)	1–3	AS Kilstett (9)
45.	FC Niederrœdern/Olympique Schaffhouse (13)	1–0	FC Hoffen (13)
46.	FC Niederlauterbach (12)	7–5 (a.e.t.)	SC Rittershoffen (11)
47.	AS St Barthelemy Leutenheim (13)	2–1	AS Forstfeld (12)
48.	FC Neewiller (13)	0–11	AS Hunspach (8)
49.	Olympique Strasbourg (8)	3–5 (a.e.t.)	AS Gambsheim (8)
50.	AS Betschdorf (9)	3–2	AS Lauterbourg (10)
51.	FC Soufflenheim (11)	0–3	FC Drusenheim (8)
52.	AS St Etienne Salmbach (12)	0–2	La Wantzenau FC (10)
53.	AS Reichstett (10)	2–1	FC Geudertheim (10)
54.	SS Brumath (12)	3–2	AS Mundolsheim (10)
55.	US Niederbronn-les-Bains (10)	3–2	US Mommenheim (11)
56.	ES Morsbronn-les-Bains (13)	2–5 (a.e.t.)	SOAS Strasbourg Robertsau (13)
57.	FC Vendenheim (13)	1–5	AS Educative Cité de l'Ill (9)
58.	CS Hautepierre Strasbourg (11)	6–1	FC Bischwiller (12)
59.	SC Red Star Strasbourg (11)	1–2	FC Durrenbach (10)
60.	FCE Reichshoffen (13)	1–2 (a.e.t.)	FC Gries (13)
61.	FC Oberhoffen (11)	2–3 (a.e.t.)	FC Weitbruch (10)
62.	US Preuschdorf-Langensoultzbach (10)	2–3	Entente Kaltenhouse/Marienthal (9)
63.	Entente Schœnenbourg-Memmelshoffen (11)	0–4	AC Hinterfeld (12)
64.	US Wittersheim (10)	2–4	AS Platania Gundershoffen (8)
65.	AS Wahlenheim-Bernolsheim (13)	3–5 (a.e.t.)	FC Eschbach (8)
66.	FC Dambach Neunhoffen (13)	0–2	FCO Strasbourg Koenigshoffen 06 (8)
67.	AS Strasbourg (9)	2–1	Fatih-Sport Haguenau (10)
68.	FC Souffelweyersheim (8)	5–7 (a.e.t.)	AS Hoerdt (8)
69.	FC Batzendorf (13)	1–5	AS Ohlungen (8)
70.	FA Val de Moder (10)	1–7	FC Schweighouse-sur-Moder (9)
71.	FC Dauendorf (12)	0–1	AS Kurtzenhouse (13)
72.	Entente AS Lembach/AS Wingen (12)	7–0	Entente Hegeney/Frœschwiller (13)
73.	AS Uhrwiller (11)	0–2	FC Kindwiller (11)
74.	FC Rohrwiller (12)	1–6	US Turcs Bischwiller (9)
75.	US Gumbrechtshoffen (11)	0–1	FC Herrlisheim (9)
76.	Entente Laubach/Forstheim (12)	0–1 (a.e.t.)	AS Wœrth (12)
77.	FC Lampertsloch-Merkswiller (13)	2–4	FC Niederschaeffolsheim (11)
78.	FC Lixhausen (13)	1–10	CS Waldhambach (10)
79.	FC Mulhausen (13)	3–0	FC Egalité Strasbourg (13)
80.	AS Ingwiller/Menchhoffen (10)	5–0	US Bouxwiller (11)
81.	FC Oermingen (12)	2–1	FC Ernolsheim-lès-Saverne (12)
82.	AS Sarrewerden (13)	4–3 (a.e.t.)	AS Schillersdorf (13)
83.	CSIE Harskirchen (12)	6–1	FC Schwenheim (13)
84.	US Imbsheim (12)	1–2 (a.e.t.)	FC Steinbourg (12)
85.	FC Keskastel (9)	0–1 (a.e.t.)	CS Strasbourg Neuhof (9)
86.	AS Weyer (10)	4–2	US Trois Maisons (10)
87.	FC Schwindratzheim (13)	2–3 (a.e.t.)	FC Waldolwisheim (13)
88.	FC Alteckendorf (11)	2–0	FC Monswiller (11)
89.	FC Mackwiller (12)	6–2	AS Lupstein (10)
90.	ASC Brotsch-Marmoutier (12)	0–1	SC Dettwiller (11)
91.	FC Phalsbourg (10)	0–3	AS Butten-Dehlingen (9)
92.	AS Weinbourg (12)	1–4	US Ettendorf (11)
93.	FC Schaffhouse-sur-Zorn (11)	1–3 (a.e.t.)	ASI Avenir (8)
94.	AS Wingen-sur-Moder (11)	0–3	AS Hochfelden (8)
95.	FC Breuschwickersheim (10)	0–5	FC Ecrivains-Schiltigheim-Bischheim (10)
96.	FC Schnersheim (12)	0–1	FC Dangolsheim (12)
97.	FC Marlenheim-Kirchheim (11)	3–4	FC Stockfeld Colombes (11)
98.	CS St Etienne Wolxheim (12)	1–4	ASPTT Strasbourg (12)
99.	FC Balbronn (13)	2–0	ES Wolfisheim (13)
100.	SC Ergersheim (12)	void (Note: SC Ergersheim folded on 11 August 2017. Entente de la Mossig Wasselonne/Romanswiller qualify.)	Entente de la Mossig Wasselonne/Romanswiller (11)
101.	ES Pfettisheim (10)	3–6	FC Wingersheim (10)
102.	AP Joie et Santé Strasbourg (10)	3–1	AS Holtzheim (9)
103.	AS Espagnols Schiltigheim (13)	1–5	ASL Duntzenheim (10)
104.	EB Achenheim (9)	1–0	FC Niederhausbergen (11)
105.	FC Eckbolsheim (8)	3–1	US Oberschaeffolsheim (8)
106.	FC Truchtersheim (10)	1–2	FC Lampertheim (9)
107.	FC Dahlenheim (9)	3–0	AS Nordheim-Kuttolsheim (12)
108.	FC Avolsheim (13)	2–4 (a.e.t.)	US Eckwersheim (11)
109.	ASLC Berstett (13)	0–3	SR Furdenheim (9)
110.	FC Quatzenheim (12)	4–2	US Dachstein (11)
111.	AS Guémar (10)	1–2	FC Reguisheim (10)
112.	AS Herrlisheim (12)	0–4	AS Turckheim (11)
113.	SR Widensolen (12)	0–2	FC Merxheim (9)
114.	FR Jebsheim-Muntzenheim (11)	0–3	ASCF Colmar 2009 (11)
115.	FC Wolfgantzen (12)	2–4	FC Heiteren (10)
116.	Racing HW 96 (8)	3–1	AS Munster (9)
117.	AS Andolsheim (10)	2–4	FC Colmar Unifié (11)
118.	FCA Portugais Colmar (12)	3–4	US Gunsbach-Zimmerbach (10)
119.	FC Wettolsheim (10)	0–1	AS Pfaffenheim (10)
120.	US Colmar (9)	0–2	SR Bergheim (10)
121.	FC Ostheim-Houssen (8)	1–3	AS Ribeauville (9)
122.	SS Espagnols Colmar (12)	1–8	FC Ingersheim (8)
123.	SR Kaysersberg (9)	4–1	AS Canton Vert (10)
124.	US Artzenheim (12)	0–11	FC Niederhergheim (9)
125.	AS Sigolsheim (11)	3–1	FC Munchhouse (9)
126.	FC Grussenheim (10)	2–3	FC Fessenheim (9)
127.	FC Rouffach (11)	8–7 (a.e.t.)	FC Horbourg-Wihr (10)
128.	FC Oberhergeim (11)	1–0	ES Wihr-au-Val (12)
129.	AS Ober-Niederentzen (10)	2–3	AGIIR Florival (8)
130.	AS Wintzenheim (12)	3–6 (a.e.t.)	AS Hattstatt (12)
131.	FC Ste Croix-en-Plaine (8)	3–2	FC Hirtzfelden (8)
132.	AS St Hippolyte (11)	0–2	Olympique Colmar (11)
133.	FC Masevaux (12)	1–4	AS Lutterbach (9)
134.	FC Petit-Landau (12)	4–0	AS Hochstatt (10)
135.	AS Blodelsheim (12)	5–4 (a.e.t.)	AS Aspach-le-Haut (10)
136.	AS Schlierbach (11)	0–2	AS Burnhaupt-le-Bas (10)
137.	AS Blanc Vieux-Thann (8)	5–2	FC Baldersheim (9)
138.	Real Mulhouse CF (8)	7–2	FC Sentheim (9)
139.	AS Raedersheim (8)	5–0	FC Anatolie Mulhouse (10)
140.	FC Battenheim (11)	1–2	FC Willer-sur-Thur (9)
141.	SC Cernay (8)	0–3	AS Red Star Mulhouse (9)
142.	SR St Amarin (8)	9–10	FC Brunstatt (9)
143.	FC Soultz (10)	4–7	ASCA Wittelsheim (8)
144.	ALSC Rumersheim (12)	0–5	FC Meyenheim (9)
145.	US Zimmersheim-Eschentzwiller (11)	0–1 (a.e.t.)	FCRS Richwiller (11)
146.	FC Roderen (10)	0–2	FC Gundolsheim (11)
147.	FC Buhl (11)	6–1	AS Tagolsheim (11)
148.	FC Ungersheim (10)	0–3	FC Feldkirch (10)
149.	AS Guewenheim (10)	0–1	FC Habsheim (9)
150.	AS Niffer (10)	5–0	AS Vallée Noble (11)
151.	FC Blue Star Reiningue (10)	0–2	FC Pfastatt 1926 (8)
152.	Mitzach Foot 77 (12)	1–12	FC Morschwiller-le-Bas (9)
153.	US Oberbruck Dolleren (10)	1–3	FC Sausheim (9)
154.	FC Lauw (11)	2–1 (a.e.t.)	FC Wintzfelden-Osenbach (9)
155.	CS Mulhouse Bourtzwiller (8)	8–0	FC Bollwiller (12)
156.	FC Ensisheim (12)	1–3	Étoile Mulhouse (12)
157.	Entente Oderen-Kruth (12)	2–1	Amical Antillais Mulhouse (12)
158.	St Georges Carspach (12)	3–2 (a.e.t.)	AS Mertzen (9)
159.	Entente Hagenbach-Balschwiller (10)	0–3	FC Uffheim (8)
160.	AS Wittersdorf (11)	4–3	Entente de la Port d'Alsace (8)
161.	Alliance Muespach-Folgensbourg (11)	3–1	FC Traubach (11)
162.	FC Kappelen (10)	1–0	FC Illfurth (10)
163.	FC Obermorschwiller (10)	2–6	AS Huningue (8)
164.	FC Tagsdorf (10)	3–2	AS Riespach (9)
165.	FC Bisel (11)	8–9 (a.e.t.)	FC Seppois (9)
166.	FC Rosenau (11)	0–2	US Azzurri Mulhouse (9)
167.	FC Steinbrunn-le-Bas (10)	4–2 (a.e.t.)	AS Raedersdorf (9)
168.	FC Kingersheim (8)	aban. (Note: Match abandoned after injury left FC Kingersheim with less than 8 players on the field. The scoreline at the time was 0–5. FC Bantzenheim qualify.)	FC Bantzenheim (8)
169.	Montreux Sports (9)	2–3	US Hésingue (10)
170.	FC Riedisheim (8)	5–3 (a.e.t.)	Mouloudia Mulhouse (8)
171.	FC Bartenheim (8)	1–2	RC Mulhouse (9)
172.	RC Dannemarie (11)	1–4	FC Village Neuf (11)
173.	AS Durmenach (12)	0–2	AS Bourgfelden St Louis (10)
174.	AS Altkirch (8)	0–1 (a.e.t.)	US Hirsingue (8)
175.	AS Durlinsdorf (11)	3–4	SC Ottmarsheim (9)
176.	FC Walheim (12)	0–6	ASCCO Helfrantzkirch (11)
177.	US Pfetterhouse (12)	1–4	AS Rixheim (9)
178.	AS Hausgauen (11)	1–3	SS Zillisheim (9)
179.	FCI Riquewihr (10)	3–1	AS Chatenois (11)
180.	AS Pfulgriesheim (11)	1–4	FC Oberhausbergen (11)
181.	AS Mertzwiller (10)	5–6 (a.e.t.)	SR Hoenheim (9)
182.	SR Zellwiller (12)	4–3 (a.e.t.)	AS Westhouse (10)
183.	SC Dinsheim (12)	0–11	FC Still 1930 (8)
184.	Entente Mothern Munchhausen (11)	2–0	US Schleithal (9)
185.	AS Willgottheim (12)	1–3	US Ittenheim (8)

=== Champagne-Ardenne ===
The matches in Champagne-Ardenne were played on 20 August 2017.

First round results: Champagne-Ardenne

Tie no	Home team (tier)	Score	Away team (tier)
1.	Sormonne SL (11)	0–3	US Revin (9)
2.	Liart-Signy-l'Abbaye FC (9)	2–2 (2–4 p)	AS Bourg-Rocroi (9)
3.	AS Lumes (10)	0–5	US Balan (10)
4.	ES Auvillers/Signy-le-Petit (11)	0–4	Nord Ardennes (9)
5.	US Margut (11)	0–3	SC Vivarois (9)
6.	FC Maubert-Fontaine (11)	0–5	FC Haybes (10)
7.	ES Vouziers (10)	1–4	FC Porcien (9)
8.	AS Charleville Franco-Turque (9)	1–0	AS Neuville-lès-This (8)
9.	AS Mouzon (8)	1–3 (a.e.t.)	FC Blagny-Carignan (9)
10.	US Fumay-Charnois (9)	0–3	ES Charleville-Mézières (9)
11.	ES Saulces-Monclin (10)	5–0	AS Sault-lès-Rethel (11)
12.	Cheveuges-St Aignan CO (10)	3–1	Floing FC (10)
13.	US St Menges (10)	0–3	USC Nouvion-sur-Meuse (9)
14.	US Ayvelles (10)	3–0	JS Vrignoise (12)
15.	AS Messincourt (11)	0–10	JS Remilly-Aillicourt (10)
16.	FC Vallant/Les Grès (9)	9–2	Olympique Chapelain (10)
17.	Amicale Bagneux-Clesles (10)	0–4	JS Vaudoise (9)
18.	USC Sénardes (11)	2–1	Rosières Omnisports (8)
19.	Torvilliers AC (11)	0–3	FC Malgache (9)
20.	AS Marginy-St Martin (9)	1–1 (2–3 p)	AS Portugaise Nogent-sur-Seine (9)
21.	ES Municipaux Troyes (8)	1–3	Renouveau Ramerupt (9)
22.	Étoile Lusigny (10)	0–3	US Vendeuvre (8)
23.	AS Tertre (9)	2–6 (a.e.t.)	US Maizières-Chatres (8)
24.	CS Trois Vallées (9)	2–0 (a.e.t.)	Alliance Sud-Ouest Football Aubois (9)
25.	SC Savières (10)	0–3	Stade Briennois (9)
26.	Foyer Compertrix (10)	3–0	FC St Martin-sur-le-Pré/La Veuve/Recy (8)
27.	AS Mourmelon-Livry-Bouy (10)	2–1	ES Fagnières (9)
28.	FC St Gibrien-Matougues (11)	0–3	AS Courtisols ESTAN (9)
29.	FC Faux-Vésigneul/Pogny (10)	5–4	US Chausséenne (11)
30.	AS Champigny (10)	3–1	US Fismes (9)
31.	Bétheny FC (10)	3–2 (a.e.t.)	FC Christo (8)
32.	US Dizy (10)	1–3	AS St Brice-Courcelles (10)
33.	US Oiry (10)	0–2	FC Sillery (9)
34.	SC de la Suippe (10)	4–1	Reims Chalet Tunisie (8)
35.	FC Turcs Épernay (8)	2–1 (a.e.t.)	SC Dormans (10)
36.	ES Gaye (11)	0–3	SC Montmirail (10)
37.	US Starnacienne (10)	1–2	ES Connantre-Corroy (11)
38.	AS Marolles (10)	0–2	US Couvrot (9)
39.	FC Ecriennes (11)	2–3	AS Bignicourt-sur-Marne (12)
40.	AS Heiltz-le-Maurupt (11)	0–2	AS Cheminon (10)
41.	ACF Charmont-Vanault (12)	0–7	USS Sermaize (10)
42.	US St Martin-d'Ablois (10)	1–2	FCF La Neuvillette-Jamin (9)
43.	ES Pierry-Moussy (10)	1–1 (3–4 p)	FC Lusitano Épernay (12)
44.	Reims Murigny Franco Portugais (9)	4–2	Espérance Rémoise (9)
45.	FC Pargny-sur-Saulx (10)	0–1	Entente Somsois/Margerie/St Utin (10)
46.	AS Froncles (10)	6–3 (a.e.t.)	IFA Chaumontaise (11)
47.	Foyer Bayard (11)	3–2	AS Poissons-Noncourt (10)
48.	ES Prauthoy-Vaux (9)	3–1	ASPTT Chaumont (9)
49.	US Fayl-Billot/Hortes (9)	2–1	US Bourbonnaise (10)
50.	CA Rolampontais (9)	4–0	CO Langres (9)
51.	FC Bologne (11)	2–5	FC Prez Bourmont (8)
52.	AF Valcourt (10)	0–3	Espérance St Dizier (9)
53.	US Biesles (10)	1–3	FC Laville-aux-Bois (10)
54.	US Bricon-Orges (11)	2–7	CS Maranville-Rennepont (9)
55.	AS Esnouveaux (11)	0–5	SR Neuilly-l'Évêque (9)
56.	ES Corgirnon-Chaudenay (10)	0–2	CS Chalindrey (10)
57.	FC Joinville-Vecqueville (9)	2–3	DS Eurville-Bienville (9)
58.	FC CS Bragard (10)	5–4 (a.e.t.)	CS Villiers-en-Lieu (10)
59.	AS Mairy-sur-Marne (12)	0–3	ES Gault-Soigny (12)

=== Lorraine ===
The matches in Lorraine were played to be played between 24 May and 13 August 2017. Tiers shown reflect the 2016–17 season.

First round results: Lorraine

Tie no	Home team (tier)	Score	Away team (tier)
1.	ES Rimling-Erching-Obergailbach (11)	1–6	AS Bliesbruck (10)
2.	US Cattenom (10)	2–3	FC Hettange-Grande (9)
3.	FC Des Ballons (11)	1–0 (a.e.t.)	FC Amerey Xertigny (12)
4.	OC Bussang (13)	0–3	FC Haute Moselotte (10)
5.	CS Thillotin (11)	3–0	AS St Ruppeen (12)
6.	FC Pagny-sur-Meuse (12)	0–3	NG Touloise (12)
7.	FC Saulxures-sur-Moselotte-Thiéfosse (12)	0–4	FC Remiremont (10)
8.	AS Plombières (10)	0–1	AS Gérardmer (9)
9.	FC Dommartin-lès-Remiremont (12)	2–1	FC St Étienne-lès-Remiremont (11)
10.	FC Charmois-l'Orgueilleux (12)	4–0	US Val de Saône (11)
11.	US La Bourgonce (12)	1–3	AS St Nabord (11)
12.	US Lexy (10)	2–3	AS Stenay-Mouzay (10)
13.	FC Vierge (13)	0–2	SR Pouxeux-Jarménil (12)
14.	US Senones (11)	0–2	US Arches-Archettes-Raon (9)
15.	FC Granges-sur-Vologne (12)	1–2 (a.e.t.)	FC Ste Marguerite (10)
16.	AS Val d'Ornain (11)	1–0	ES Tilly-Ambly Villers-Bouquemont (11)
17.	US Mirecourt-Hymont (11)	4–3 (a.e.t.)	IFC Lerrain-Esley (12)
18.	AS Cheniménil (12)	4–5 (a.e.t.)	Dogneville FC (11)
19.	ASCC Seuil-d'Argonne (11)	0–2	FC Fains-Véel (10)
20.	Saulcy FC (11)	3–4	CS Rambervillers (12)
21.	SM Taintrux (10)	0–2	FC Hadol-Dounoux (9)
22.	ES Badonviller-Celles (12)	0–3	ASC Kellermann (9)
23.	ASC Dompaire (12)	2–0	CS Charmes (10)
24.	US Behonne/Longeville (10)	5–2	AS Dieue-Sommedieue (9)
25.	ASL Coussey-Greux (10)	3–1 (a.e.t.)	AC Rigny-la-Salle (11)
26.	AS Gironcourt (10)	1–0 (a.e.t.)	AS Dommartin La Vraine (12)
27.	Gars de l'Ornois Gondrecourt (12)	0–2	AS Tréveray (10)
28.	Entente Réhon Villers Morfontaine (10)	3–0	US Russange (12)
29.	ES Longuyon (10)	3–0	ES Gorcy-Cosnes (12)
30.	FC Pierrefitte-sur-Aire (11)	1–2	SC Commercy (10)
31.	LSC Portieux (13)	6–1	AS Essegney-Langley (12)
32.	FC Dugny (10)	1–2 (a.e.t.)	US Etain-Buzy (9)
33.	FC Waldhouse-Walschbronn (13)	2–2 (2–3 p)	Entente Petit-Rederching/Siersthal (11)
34.	Lorraine Vaucoulers (11)	2–2 (5–4 p)	US Lamarche (11)
35.	CS Réhon (13)	1–1 (5–4 p)	JL Knutange (11)
36.	ES Vallée de l'Othain St Jean/Marville (11)	2–0	ASC Charny (13)
37.	ACS Herserange (11)	4–2	US Aumetz (12)
38.	USB Longwy (10)	0–2 (a.e.t.)	CS Volmerange-les-Mines (11)
39.	AS Colombey (13)	1–4	Toul JCA (11)
40.	FC Lemberg-St Louis (10)	3–4	FC Rahling (11)
41.	Olympique Mittelbronn 04 (11)	2–4	US Goetzenbruck-Meisenthal (10)
42.	GS Vézelise (12)	1–2	AJS René II (13)
43.	SC Baccarat (10)	2–1	Amicale de Chanteheux (11)
44.	FC Cirey-sur-Vezouze (12)	3–5 (a.e.t.)	AS Réding (9)
45.	US Schneckenbusch (10)	1–4	AS Blâmont (10)
46.	GAS St Clément-Laronxe (11)	0–7	ES Lunéville Sixte (10)
47.	ES Gros Rederching-Bettviller (10)	1–3	AS Kalhausen (11)
48.	FC Lucey-Boucq-Trondes (12)	1–2	FC Écrouves (10)
49.	ES Bayon-Roville (11)	0–1	AS Rehainviller Hérimenil (10)
50.	US Viterne et Madon (13)	0–5 (a.e.t.)	ES Laneuveville (11)
51.	FC Toul (10)	7–2	Entente Sud 54 (11)
52.	AS Dommartin-lès-Toul (12)	10–0	AS Velaine-en-Haye (13)
53.	AJSE Montauville (12)	4–2	FC Richardménil Flavigny Méréville Messein (10)
54.	US Rosières-aux-Salines (11)	6–2	AS Art-sur-Meuthe-Bosserville-Lenoncourt (12)
55.	USI Jaillon (13)	0–10	AS Gondreville (10)
56.	GSA Tomblaine (12)	1–3	Stade Flévillois (10)
57.	FC Houdemont (10)	4–3	Olympique Haussonville (13)
58.	AF Einville (12)	2–6	ASC Saulxures-lès-Nancy (10)
59.	FC Hambach (12)	1–0	CS Wittring (11)
60.	Maxéville FC (10)	7–0	Omnisports Frouard Pompey (11)
61.	MJC Pichon (10)	0–6	FC St Max-Essey (9)
62.	FC Seichamps (11)	4–1	AF Laxou Sapinière (9)
63.	FR Faulx (12)	0–6	SC Malzéville (10)
64.	FTM Liverdun (12)	0–5	FC Dieulouard (12)
65.	AS Lay-St Christophe/Bouxieres-aux-Dames (10)	0–2	AS Grand Couronne (9)
66.	US Roth (11)	6–0	US Hundling (11)
67.	US Bousbach (13)	0–3	US Rouhling (10)
68.	FC Beausoleil Sarreguemines (12)	0–3	AS Neunkirch (10)
69.	US St Jean-Rohrbach (12)	0–1	AS Le Val-de-Guéblange (10)
70.	US Holving (11)	1–3 (a.e.t.)	CS Diebling (10)
71.	US Etzling (12)	0–3	US Alsting-Zinzing (10)
72.	GS Nébing (11)	2–1	US Hilsprich (12)
73.	FC Metzing (10)	4–2	AS Kerbach (11)
74.	US Spicheren (11)	2–4 (a.e.t.)	AS Montbronn (9)
75.	AC Franco Turc Forbach (12)	2–3 (a.e.t.)	FC Verrerie-Sophie (10)
76.	FC Farschviller (11)	0–2	ES Macheren Petit-Eversviller (9)
77.	FC Château-Salins (11)	1–1 (5–4 p)	ENJ Val-de-Seille (11)
78.	US Morsbach (10)	4–2	ASJA St Avold (11)
79.	Alliance Cocheren-Rosbruck (10)	2–1	AS Betting-Guenviller (11)
80.	FC Hochwald (10)	1–4	ES Petite-Rosselle (9)
81.	ES Lixing-Laning (11)	5–2	FC L'Hôpital (9)
82.	EF Delme-Solgne (10)	4–0	ES Béchy (12)
83.	US Valmont (11)	4–1	FC Longeville-lès-St Avold (11)
84.	Génération Grenat 95 (13)	2–7	ES Courcelles-sur-Nied (10)
85.	GS Thiaucourt (11)	0–1	SC Marly (9)
86.	FC Porcelette (12)	2–3 (a.e.t.)	JS Rémering-lès-Hargarten (11)
87.	Flétrange SA (11)	3–11	FC Carling (10)
88.	AS Falck (12)	5–1	ES Villing (13)
89.	FC Vœlfling (11)	5–3	US Oudrenne (11)
90.	FC Vandières (13)	0–4	FC Novéant (9)
91.	ES Maizières (10)	0–7	ESAP Metz (10)
92.	ESR Rémeling (10)	2–1	FC Éblange (11)
93.	US Filstroff (11)	2–1 (a.e.t.)	CO Bouzonville (11)
94.	ES Kirschnaumen Montenach (12)	0–4	US Yutz (10)
95.	AS Entrange (11)	2–4 (a.e.t.)	JS Audunoise (9)
96.	JS Rettel-Hunting (10)	4–0	ASC Elzange (11)
97.	JS Ars-Laquenexy (10)	0–2	MJC Volmerange-lès-Boulay (9)
98.	ES Crusnes (11)	0–6	US Fontoy (10)
99.	Excelsior Cuvry (10)	0–2	CO Metz Bellecroix (11)
100.	AS Corny (12)	0–2	CSA Jouy-aux-Arches (13)
101.	ES Haut Plateau Messin (12)	2–4	AS Mars-la Tour (11)
102.	US Jarny (10)	1–5	AS St Julien-lès-Metz (9)
103.	ASPF Ste Marie-aux-Chênes (12)	3–0	US Batilly (11)
104.	FC Angevillers (12)	4–0	AS Tucquegnieux-Trieux (11)
105.	AS Sœtrich (11)	5–2	AS Œutrange (12)
106.	AS Konacker (13)	3–4 (a.e.t.)	US Guentrange (11)
107.	JS Distroff (12)	1–9	ASC Basse-Ham (10)
108.	US Avrilloise (12)	1–4	US Illange (11)
109.	AS Algrange (10)	4–0	US Froidcul (9)
110.	US Volkrange (12)	2–1	SC Terville (10)
111.	JS Manom (12)	1–2 (a.e.t.)	FC Valleroy-Moinville (11)
112.	UL Moyeuvre (11)	0–8	USL Mont St Martin (10)
113.	TS Bertrange (11)	2–0	ES Richemont (11)
114.	AJ Aubouésienne (11)	1–2	ES Marange-Silvange (9)
115.	US Vigy (11)	1–2 (a.e.t.)	LS Vantoux (12)
116.	AS Florange-Ebange (11)	2–1	ES Rosselange Vitry (10)
117.	AS Ay-sur-Moselle (12)	1–3	FC Pierrevillers (10)
118.	FC Vernéville (11)	2–1	US Conflans (10)
119.	RS La Maxe (10)	3–2 (a.e.t.)	FC Mondelange (9)
120.	AS Les Côteaux (11)	2–0	AF Os Conquistadors Metz (12)
121.	SC Moulins-lès-Metz (11)	3–7 (a.e.t.)	US Châtel-St Germain (9)
122.	FC Woippy (11)	7–0	JSO Ennery (11)
123.	US Ban-St Martin (10)	10–0	AS Metz Grange aux Bois (12)
124.	ES Charmois Damelevières (11)	0–2	AS Varangéville-St Nicolas (9)
125.	FC Sarralbe (11)	0–2	JA Rémilly (9)
126.	Entente Centre Ornain (9)	3–0	Brillon AC (11)
127.	ES Woippy (11)	8–2	US Briey (9)
128.	FC Ajolais (12)	3–0	FC Le Tholy (12)
129.	Entente Schorbach Hottviller Volmunster 13 (11)	1–0	ES Ormersviller-Epping (10)
130.	ES Garrebourg (12)	0–2	AS Brouviller (11)
131.	FC Verny-Louvigny-Cuvry (10)	3–1	FC Pont-à-Mousson (11)
132.	AS Darney (12)	4–5 (a.e.t.)	ES Aviere Darnieulles (11)
133.	FC Haironville (11)	7–2	ES Maizey-Lacroix (10)
134.	US Thierville (10)	4–2	Association St Laurent Mangiennes (11)
135.	US Marspich (10)	3–2	FC Guénange (11)
136.	FC Hommert (10)	4–1	Montagnarde Walscheid (11)
137.	AS Henridorff (10)	0–2	AS Laneuveville Marainviller (10)
138.	FC Héming (12)	5–4 (a.e.t.)	FC Troisfontaines (10)
139.	FC Rohrbach-Bining (10)	10–0	SG Marienau (9)
140.	Sportive Lorquinoise (10)	5–2	US Fénétrange-Mittersheim (11)
141.	AS Bettborn Hellering (10)	7–0	AS Rech (12)
142.	FC Dieuze (10)	3–1	JS Bischwald (11)
143.	ES Schœneck (12)	1–2	CS Stiring-Wendel (11)
144.	FC Francaltroff (12)	0–4	AS Grostenquin Berig Bistroff (10)
145.	AS Hellimer (10)	3–0	FC Vahl-Ebersing (11)
146.	FC Freyming (10)	unknown	SSEP Hombourg-Haut (11)
147.	ES Créhange-Faulquemont (10)	2–2 (2–4 p)	FC Coume (11)
148.	US Boulange (10)	1–5 (Note: Entente Bure-Boulange were formed in May 2017 by a merger of US Boulange and FC Bure, after the first round game between the two clubs.. They took the place of FC Bure in the second round.)	FC Bure (11)
149.	AS Padoux (11)	3–0	Entente Bru-Jeanménil SBH (10)
150.	CS Philippsbourg (12)	2–11	AS Mouterhouse (10)
151.	Cercle St Jean Augny (11)	4–0 (Note: Game was replayed due to the referee not playing extra time before penalty kicks. Original result 1–1 (8–9 p).)	JS Ancy-sur-Moselle (12)
152.	ES Avricourt Moussey (10)	0–2	SS Hilbesheim (11)
153.	SC Contrisson (11)	4–3	FC Revigny (11)

== Second round ==
=== Alsace ===
These matches were played on 19 and 20 August 2017.

Second round results: Alsace

Tie no	Home team (tier)	Score	Away team (tier)
1.	AS Musau Strasbourg (12)	2–1	AS Neudorf (9)
2.	FC Hilsenheim (12)	3–1	FC Kertzfeld (13)
3.	USL Duppigheim (10)	2–1	FC Rossfeld (8)
4.	US Hindisheim (8)	4–2	US Scherwiller (9)
5.	US Meistratzheim (13)	0–11	CS Fegersheim (9)
6.	ASB Schirmeck-La Broque (11)	2–3	UJ Epfig (11)
7.	SR Zellwiller (12)	0–2	FC Rhinau (10)
8.	US Nordhouse (9)	3–2	AS Portugais Sélestat (9)
9.	FC Boersch (11)	1–2	AS Sermersheim (9)
10.	AS Natzwiller (11)	2–1	FC Lingolsheim (11)
11.	FC Sélestat (9)	4–4 (3–4 p)	OC Lipsheim (10)
12.	AS Altorf (12)	1–2	Strasbourg Université Club (11)
13.	LS Molsheim (8)	1–2	SC Ebersheim (9)
14.	AS Villé 2010 (12)	1–6	US Baldenheim (9)
15.	FC Artolsheim (11)	0–6	FC Still 1930 (8)
16.	FC Krautergersheim (11)	4–2 (a.e.t.)	AS Gerstheim (10)
17.	CS Ste Croix-aux-Mines (11)	1–4	AS Bischoffsheim (8)
18.	AS Niedernai (12)	2–1	AS Schœnau (12)
19.	FC Entzheim (10)	1–2	AS Mutzig (8)
20.	AS Ohlungen (8)	3–1	AS Educative Cité de l'Ill (9)
21.	FC Gries (13)	0–4	US Turcs Bischwiller (9)
22.	AC Hinterfeld (12)	0–4	AS Hunspach (8)
23.	FC Kindwiller (11)	1–3	FR Sessenheim-Stattmatten (10)
24.	AS Kurtzenhouse (13)	2–4	FC Scheibenhard (11)
25.	FC Niederrœdern/Olympique Schaffhouse (13)	1–7	La Wantzenau FC (10)
26.	FC Schweighouse-sur-Moder (9)	1–1 (5–4 p)	Entente Kaltenhouse/Marienthal (9)
27.	FC Weitbruch (10)	1–3	FC Drusenheim (8)
28.	FC Niederschaeffolsheim (11)	2–3	FC Riedseltz/Rott (10)
29.	AS Betschdorf (9)	1–0	US Niederbronn-les-Bains (10)
30.	AS Wœrth (12)	2–1	FC Durrenbach (10)
31.	SS Brumath (12)	2–6	AS Gambsheim (8)
32.	SOAS Strasbourg Robertsau (13)	1–9	Entente Mothern Munchhausen (11)
33.	Entente AS Lembach/AS Wingen (12)	1–1 (4–5 p)	FC Eschbach (8)
34.	AS Hoerdt (8)	4–1	AS Kilstett (9)
35.	AS St Barthelemy Leutenheim (13)	2–3	AS Platania Gundershoffen (8)
36.	FCO Strasbourg Koenigshoffen 06 (8)	1–3	FC Steinseltz (8)
37.	FC Niederlauterbach (12)	1–4	FC Herrlisheim (9)
38.	AS Hatten (12)	1–3	CS Hautepierre Strasbourg (11)
39.	SR Hoenheim (9)	1–0	AS Reichstett (10)
40.	FC Oberroedern/Aschbach (10)	1–2	AS Strasbourg (9)
41.	CS Waldhambach (10)	1–0	FC Dossenheim-sur-Zinsel (11)
42.	FC Mackwiller (12)	0–2	CS Strasbourg Neuhof (9)
43.	ASPTT Strasbourg (12)	1–3	FC Dangolsheim (12)
44.	FC Stockfeld Colombes (11)	6–3 (a.e.t.)	AS Weyer (10)
45.	FC Balbronn (13)	0–11	US Ittenheim (8)
46.	AS Sarrewerden (13)	0–4	FC Lampertheim (9)
47.	FC Waldolwisheim (13)	2–3 (a.e.t.)	ASL Duntzenheim (10)
48.	FC Steinbourg (12)	0–6	EB Achenheim (9)
49.	FC Alteckendorf (11)	0–2	AS Hochfelden (8)
50.	FC Oberhausbergen (11)	2–4	FC Ecrivains-Schiltigheim-Bischheim (10)
51.	FC Oermingen (12)	0–7	FC Wingersheim (10)
52.	SC Dettwiller (11)	3–0	Entente de la Mossig Wasselonne/Romanswiller (11)
53.	US Ettendorf (11)	3–3 (5–4 p)	AS Ingwiller/Menchhoffen (10)
54.	AS Butten-Dehlingen (9)	1–0	FC Eckbolsheim (8)
55.	CSIE Harskirchen (12)	1–6	ASI Avenir (8)
56.	FC Mulhausen (13)	1–3	SR Furdenheim (9)
57.	FC Dahlenheim (9)	2–0	AP Joie et Santé Strasbourg (10)
58.	US Eckwersheim (11)	4–0	FC Quatzenheim (12)
59.	AS Pfaffenheim (10)	2–2 (5–4 p)	FC Niederhergheim (9)
60.	SR Bergheim (10)	4–0	FC Oberhergeim (11)
61.	FC Colmar Unifié (11)	1–5	FC Ingersheim (8)
62.	FC Fessenheim (9)	4–6 (a.e.t.)	AGIIR Florival (8)
63.	AS Turckheim (11)	3–0	AS Hattstatt (12)
64.	FC Merxheim (9)	0–1	AS Ribeauville (9)
65.	Olympique Colmar (11)	1–2	US Gunsbach-Zimmerbach (10)
66.	ASCF Colmar 2009 (11)	0–3	FC Ste Croix-en-Plaine (8)
67.	Racing HW 96 (8)	5–0	SR Kaysersberg (9)
68.	FC Heiteren (10)	0–1	FC Reguisheim (10)
69.	FC Rouffach (11)	6–0	FCI Riquewihr (10)
70.	Étoile Mulhouse (12)	6–0	FC Petit-Landau (12)
71.	FCRS Richwiller (11)	4–6	AS Red Star Mulhouse (9)
72.	FC Willer-sur-Thur (9)	4–7	AS Raedersheim (8)
73.	FC Meyenheim (9)	1–1 (5–6 p)	ASCA Wittelsheim (8)
74.	FC Buhl (11)	2–4	AS Blanc Vieux-Thann (8)
75.	AS Lutterbach (9)	3–1	FC Brunstatt (9)
76.	FC Lauw (11)	1–1 (1–3 p)	Real Mulhouse CF (8)
77.	Entente Oderen-Kruth (12)	0–1	AS Blodelsheim (12)
78.	FC Habsheim (9)	5–1	FC Feldkirch (10)
79.	FC Gundolsheim (11)	1–5	FC Pfastatt 1926 (8)
80.	FC Sausheim (9)	0–1	AS Burnhaupt-le-Bas (10)
81.	FC Morschwiller-le-Bas (9)	3–2 (a.e.t.)	AS Niffer (10)
82.	St Georges Carspach (12)	1–7	CS Mulhouse Bourtzwiller (8)
83.	AS Huningue (8)	4–0	SC Ottmarsheim (9)
84.	US Hésingue (10)	0–3	US Azzurri Mulhouse (9)
85.	FC Steinbrunn-le-Bas (10)	0–4	FC Riedisheim (8)
86.	AS Bourgfelden St Louis (10)	1–5	FC Bantzenheim (8)
87.	RC Mulhouse (9)	2–4	FC Tagsdorf (10)
88.	FC Seppois (9)	1–5	SS Zillisheim (9)
89.	FC Village Neuf (11)	0–3	FC Kappelen (10)
90.	ASCCO Helfrantzkirch (11)	1–0	FC Uffheim (8)
91.	AS Rixheim (9)	2–1	US Hirsingue (8)
92.	Alliance Muespach-Folgensbourg (11)	2–2 (3–1 p)	AS Wittersdorf (11)

=== Champagne-Ardenne ===
These matches were played on 27 August 2017.

Second round results: Champagne-Ardenne

Tie no	Home team (tier)	Score	Away team (tier)
1.	FC Laville-aux-Bois (10)	2–0	SR Neuilly-l'Évêque (9)
2.	USS Sermaize (10)	0–3	Vitry FC (7)
3.	AS Bignicourt-sur-Marne (12)	2–1	AS Cheminon (10)
4.	US Couvrot (9)	0–3	Châlons FCO (7)
5.	ES Connantre-Corroy (11)	2–1	FC Côte des Blancs (8)
6.	SC Montmirail (10)	2–6	RC Sézanne (7)
7.	SC de la Suippe (10)	1–2	AS Taissy (7)
8.	FC Sillery (9)	1–3	SC Tinqueux (7)
9.	AS St Brice-Courcelles (10)	5–0	FC Lusitano Épernay (12)
10.	Bétheny FC (10)	0–7	Argonne FC (7)
11.	AS Champigny (10)	1–3	AS Cernay-Berru-Lavannes (8)
12.	FCF La Neuvillette-Jamin (9)	1–3	US Avize-Grauves (7)
13.	Reims Murigny Franco Portugais (9)	2–2 (5–4 p)	Nord Champagne FC (7)
14.	FC Prez Bourmont (8)	2–3	Espérance St Dizier (9)
15.	US Fayl-Billot/Hortes (9)	0–1 (a.e.t.)	AS Sarrey-Montigny (8)
16.	FC CS Bragard (10)	2–4	US Montier-en-Der (8)
17.	DS Eurville-Bienville (9)	2–3	Stade Chevillonnais (8)
18.	ES Prauthoy-Vaux (9)	2–1	ES Andelot-Rimaucourt-Bourdons (8)
19.	CA Rolampontais (9)	1–2	SL Ornel (7)
20.	Foyer Bayard (11)	1–4	SC Marnaval (7)
21.	CS Chalindrey (10)	0–4	FC Sts-Geosmois (7)
22.	AS Froncles (10)	0–8	USI Blaise (7)
23.	Entente Somsois/Margerie/St Utin (10)	2–7	AFM Romilly (7)
24.	FC Faux-Vésigneul/Pogny (10)	3–6 (a.e.t.)	ASPTT Châlons (7)
25.	AS Courtisols ESTAN (9)	0–0 (5–4 p)	FC Turcs Épernay (8)
26.	JS Remilly-Aillicourt (10)	4–4 (4–3 p)	Olympique Torcy-Sedan (8)
27.	US Ayvelles (10)	1–4	AS Tournes/Renwez/Les Mazures/Arreux/Montcornet (8)
28.	Cheveuges-St Aignan CO (10)	3–2	FC Allobais Doncherois (8)
29.	FC Blagny-Carignan (9)	1–1 (5–3 p)	US Bazeilles (7)
30.	AS Charleville Franco-Turque (9)	1–4	FC Bogny (8)
31.	USC Nouvion-sur-Meuse (9)	0–3 (a.e.t.)	USA Le Chesne (7)
32.	QV Douzy (8)	4–2	SC Vivarois (9)
33.	Nord Ardennes (9)	1–3	ES Charleville-Mézières (9)
34.	US Balan (10)	1–1 (5–4 p)	CA Villers-Semuse (7)
35.	AS Bourg-Rocroi (9)	0–1	Le Theux FC (8)
36.	FC Porcien (9)	2–1	AS Asfeld (7)
37.	ES Saulces-Monclin (10)	1–1 (1–3 p)	ES Witry-les-Reims (8)
38.	AS Mourmelon-Livry-Bouy (10)	3–2	CS Agéen (8)
39.	ES Gault-Soigny (12)	0–1	Foyer Compertrix (10)
40.	Étoile Chapelaine (8)	4–1	CS Maranville-Rennepont (9)
41.	FC Vallant/Les Grès (9)	4–7 (a.e.t.)	JS St Julien FC (7)
42.	Stade Briennois (9)	1–5	Foyer Barsequanais (7)
43.	US Maizières-Chatres (8)	1–1 (5–3 p)	FC Malgache (9)
44.	JS Vaudoise (9)	4–2	Renouveau Ramerupt (9)
45.	USC Sénardes (11)	1–2	ESC Melda (8)
46.	CS Trois Vallées (9)	1–0	AS Portugaise Nogent-sur-Seine (9)
47.	Bar-sur-Aube FC (8)	6–0	US Vendeuvre (8)
48.	US Revin (9)	1–0	FC Haybes (10)

=== Lorraine ===
These matches were played between 19 and 23 August 2017.

Second round results: Lorraine

Tie no	Home team (tier)	Score	Away team (tier)
1.	FC Des Ballons (10)	1–2	AS Vagney (8)
2.	FC Haute Moselotte (10)	5–1	CS Thillotin (11)
3.	FC Ajolais (12)	0–5	ES Golbey (7)
4.	FC Remiremont (10)	4–0	FC Dommartin-lès-Remiremont (12)
5.	US Arches-Archettes-Raon (10)	2–0	AS Gérardmer (9)
6.	AS St Nabord (10)	2–5	FC Éloyes (8)
7.	SC Contrisson (11)	1–2	FC St Mihiel (8)
8.	AS Stenay-Mouzay (10)	0–8	SF Verdun Belleville (8)
9.	FC Hadol-Dounoux (10)	0–1	AS Girancourt-Dommartin-Chaumousey (8)
10.	SR Pouxeux-Jarménil (11)	0–2	AS Padoux (11)
11.	LSC Portieux (12)	5–3	FC Charmois-l'Orgueilleux (12)
12.	US Behonne/Longeville (11)	0–4	US Thierville (10)
13.	Bulgnéville Contrex Vittel FC (9)	3–1	AS Nomexy-Vincey (7)
14.	AS Val d'Ornain (11)	0–4	Entente Centre Ornain (9)
15.	Lorraine Vaucoulers (11)	6–2	FC Fains-Véel (10)
16.	CS Rambervillers (12)	1–10	FC Ste Marguerite (9)
17.	SC Baccarat (10)	0–2	ASC Kellermann (9)
18.	ES Aviere Darnieulles (11)	8–1	ASC Dompaire (12)
19.	Dogneville FC (11)	0–7	GS Haroué-Benney (8)
20.	Toul JCA (10)	3–1 (a.e.t.)	FC Neufchâteau-Liffol (9)
21.	FC Haironville (10)	0–6	Entente Vigneulles-Hannonville-Fresne (8)
22.	AJS René II (12)	1–3	AS Gironcourt (10)
23.	AS Dommartin-lès-Toul (11)	5–1	ASL Coussey-Greux (11)
24.	AS Tréveray (11)	0–1	Entente Sorcy Void-Vacon (8)
25.	US Mirecourt-Hymont (11)	0–5	AC Blainville-Damelevières (8)
26.	TS Bertrange (10)	1–3	USL Mont St Martin (9)
27.	US Volkrange (12)	1–2	ES Longuyon (10)
28.	US Goetzenbruck-Meisenthal (10)	0–3	AS Mouterhouse (9)
29.	Entente Schorbach Hottviller Volmunster 13 (11)	0–3	FC Rohrbach-Bining (10)
30.	FC Héming (12)	2–0	FC Hommert (10)
31.	Entente Petit-Rederching/Siersthal (11)	8–0	FC Hambach (12)
32.	FC Rahling (11)	1–3 (a.e.t.)	US Soucht (9)
33.	AS Kalhausen (10)	2–3 (a.e.t.)	SO Ippling (9)
34.	AS Brouviller (11)	0–3	EF Turque Sarrebourg (8)
35.	SS Hilbesheim (11)	1–3	AS Réding (9)
36.	Sportive Lorquinoise (10)	4–1	AS Blâmont (10)
37.	SC Commercy (10)	1–2	FC Écrouves (10)
38.	ACS Herserange (11)	2–7	CS Veymerange (7)
39.	Entente Réhon Villers Morfontaine (11)	0–3	FC Hettange-Grande (9)
40.	JS Audunoise (9)	4–0	US Fontoy (10)
41.	CS Diebling (10)	3–3 (4–2 p)	US Roth (11)
42.	AS Bliesbruck (10)	1–2	Achen-Etting-Schmittviller (9)
43.	AS Bettborn Hellering (10)	5–1	AS Hellimer (9)
44.	AS Rehainviller Hérimenil (11)	1–5	FC St Max-Essey (9)
45.	AS Laneuveville Marainviller (10)	0–8	ES Lunéville Sixte (9)
46.	NG Touloise (11)	0–3	ASC Saulxures-lès-Nancy (10)
47.	US Rosières-aux-Salines (12)	0–2	FC Toul (10)
48.	ES Heillecourt (7)	2–0	AS Ludres (8)
49.	ES Laneuveville (10)	4–2	Stade Flévillois (10)
50.	Maxéville FC (10)	2–5	AS Gondreville (9)
51.	FC Dombasle-sur-Meurthe (8)	2–1	COS Villers (7)
52.	SC Malzéville (11)	2–1	FC Houdemont (10)
53.	AS Varangéville-St Nicolas (10)	0–5	FC Pulnoy (8)
54.	ES Custines-Malleloy (9)	2–3	AS Villey-St Étienne (8)
55.	AS Haut-du-Lièvre Nancy (9)	3–0	FC Dieulouard (13)
56.	ASPF Ste Marie-aux-Chênes (12)	2–1	US Etain-Buzy (9)
57.	FC Seichamps (11)	1–2	AS Grand Couronne (9)
58.	AS Neunkirch (11)	0–1	AS Montbronn (10)
59.	US Rouhling (10)	0–3	FC Metzing (11)
60.	GS Nébing (11)	1–2	AS Le Val-de-Guéblange (10)
61.	US Valmont (11)	6–1	FC Dieuze (10)
62.	US Nousseviller (8)	0–3	US Alsting-Zinzing (10)
63.	CS Stiring-Wendel (10)	1–4	US Behren-lès-Forbach (8)
64.	FC Verrerie-Sophie (11)	0–8	USF Farébersviller (8)
65.	FC Château-Salins (11)	0–4	AS Morhange (8)
66.	US Morsbach (10)	2–5	ES Macheren Petit-Eversviller (9)
67.	SSEP Hombourg-Haut (10)	6–0	Alliance Cocheren-Rosbruck (11)
68.	AS Grostenquin Berig Bistroff (10)	0–8	SO Merlebach (8)
69.	ES Petite-Rosselle (9)	2–1	SR Creutzwald 03 (7)
70.	FC Carling (10)	1–0	FC Folschviller (8)
71.	EF Delme-Solgne (10)	2–0	SC Marly (9)
72.	JS Wenheck (8)	2–4	CA Boulay (7)
73.	AS Falck (12)	2–1 (a.e.t.)	ES Lixing-Laning (10)
74.	AJSE Montauville (11)	0–2	CS&O Blénod-Pont-à-Mousson (7)
75.	JS Rémering-lès-Hargarten (11)	6–0	JS Rettel-Hunting (11)
76.	FC Coume (10)	3–1	FC Vœlfling (11)
77.	US Guentrange (10)	0–2	USAG Uckange (7)
78.	US Filstroff (11)	1–2	MJC Volmerange-lès-Boulay (9)
79.	FC Verny-Louvigny-Cuvry (10)	10–1	JA Rémilly (9)
80.	CSA Jouy-aux-Arches (12)	1–4	ESAP Metz (10)
81.	CO Metz Bellecroix (10)	0–9	FC Novéant (9)
82.	FC Devant-les-Ponts Metz (8)	3–2	ES Courcelles-sur-Nied (11)
83.	AS Mars-la Tour (none)	0–3	US Châtel-St Germain (9)
84.	Cercle St Jean Augny (11)	1–1 (3–4 p)	ES Metz (8)
85.	FC Valleroy-Moinville (10)	1–2	FC Hagondange (7)
86.	RS La Maxe (10)	1–3	AS Montigny-lès-Metz (8)
87.	FC Woippy (10)	1–6	CS Homécourt (7)
88.	LS Vantoux (11)	6–7	ES Woippy (9)
89.	FC Vernéville (11)	0–1	US Ban-St Martin (10)
90.	ES Marange-Silvange (10)	0–2	UL Plantières Metz (7)
91.	FC Pierrevillers (10)	1–0 (Note: AS St Julien-lès-Metz penalised (reason unknown). FC Pierrevillers qualify. Original scoreline 1–3.)	AS St Julien-lès-Metz (9)
92.	AS Les Côteaux (10)	1–0	FC Bassin Piennois (7)
93.	US Yutz (10)	1–2	ES Gandrange (8)
94.	Entente Bure-Boulange (10)	3–1	US Kœnigsmacker (8)
95.	FC Hayange (9)	1–2 (a.e.t.)	UL Rombas (8)
96.	CS Volmerange-les-Mines (11)	3–2	ESR Rémeling (10)
97.	ASC Basse-Ham (10)	3–1	AS Clouange (8)
98.	AS Algrange (10)	3–2 (a.e.t.)	AS Saulnes Longlaville (8)
99.	FC Angevillers (12)	3–1	ES Vallée de l'Othain St Jean/Marville (11)
100.	US Marspich (11)	0–4	AS Portugais St Francois Thionville (8)
101.	AS Sœtrich (11)	1–8	ES Villerupt-Thil (7)
102.	AS Florange-Ebange (10)	1–2	CS Godbrange (9)
103.	CS Réhon (12)	6–2	US Illange (11)
104.	ES Jœuf (8)	2–4	FC Yutz (7)

== Third round ==
=== Alsace ===
These matches were played on 9 and 10 September 2017.

Third round results: Alsace

Tie no	Home team (tier)	Score	Away team (tier)
1.	AS Sermersheim (9)	3–1 (a.e.t.)	OC Lipsheim (10)
2.	AS Mutzig (8)	1–1 (3–4 p)	FA Illkirch Graffenstaden (6)
3.	FC Krautergersheim (11)	0–3	FC Kronenbourg Strasbourg (6)
4.	FC Dahlenheim (9)	0–2	AS Menora Strasbourg (7)
5.	FC Hilsenheim (12)	0–4	CS Fegersheim (9)
6.	FC Rhinau (10)	2–1 (a.e.t.)	CS Hautepierre Strasbourg (11)
7.	SC Ebersheim (9)	1–4	US Baldenheim (9)
8.	FC Still 1930 (8)	2–1	AS Erstein (5)
9.	USL Duppigheim (10)	1–2	AS Bischoffsheim (8)
10.	UJ Epfig (11)	1–1 (1–3 p)	ALFC Duttlenheim (7)
11.	AS Natzwiller (11)	0–5	US Ittenheim (8)
12.	FC Geispolsheim 01 (7)	3–1 (a.e.t.)	AS Bergbieten (7)
13.	US Nordhouse (9)	1–2 (a.e.t.)	FCSR Obernai (6)
14.	AS Niedernai (12)	1–8	US Hindisheim (8)
15.	AS Butten-Dehlingen (9)	0–3	ASPV Strasbourg (6)
16.	FC Stockfeld Colombes (11)	0–4	US Sarre-Union (5)
17.	US Ettendorf (11)	1–3 (a.e.t.)	AS Gambsheim (8)
18.	US Eckwersheim (11)	0–6	CS Strasbourg Neuhof (9)
19.	AS Hochfelden (8)	3–1	AS Hoerdt (8)
20.	CS Waldhambach (10)	2–1	SC Drulingen (7)
21.	FC Schweighouse-sur-Moder (9)	3–1	AS Ernolsheim-sur-Bruche (7)
22.	AS Ohlungen (8)	0–1	FC Obermodern (6)
23.	FC Dangolsheim (12)	1–3	FC Wingersheim (10)
24.	EB Achenheim (9)	1–1 (2–4 p)	SR Furdenheim (9)
25.	FC Saverne (7)	2–2 (4–3 p)	AS Elsau Portugais Strasbourg (7)
26.	ASI Avenir (8)	0–1	US Reipertswiller (6)
27.	ASL Duntzenheim (10)	1–2	SC Dettwiller (11)
28.	SS Weyersheim (7)	1–1 (3–4 p)	FCSR Haguenau (5)
29.	FC Riedseltz/Rott (10)	0–3	AS Platania Gundershoffen (8)
30.	AS Strasbourg (9)	2–0	FC Herrlisheim (9)
31.	ASL Robertsau (7)	2–7	FC Steinseltz (8)
32.	AS Musau Strasbourg (12)	3–1	AS Wœrth (12)
33.	FC Scheibenhard (11)	1–5	FC St Etienne Seltz (7)
34.	FR Sessenheim-Stattmatten (10)	3–0	Entente Mothern Munchhausen (11)
35.	FC Soultz-sous-Forêts/Kutzenhausen (7)	1–2	FCE Schirrhein (6)
36.	US Turcs Bischwiller (9)	2–1 (a.e.t.)	AS Betschdorf (9)
37.	FC Soleil Bischheim (6)	2–1 (a.e.t.)	US Oberlauterbach (6)
38.	FC Eschbach (8)	1–5	AS Hunspach (8)
39.	FC Lampertheim (9)	1–4	FC Drusenheim (8)
40.	Strasbourg Université Club (11)	3–4 (a.e.t.)	SR Hoenheim (9)
41.	La Wantzenau FC (10)	0–1	FC Ecrivains-Schiltigheim-Bischheim (10)
42.	FC Ingersheim (8)	1–5 (a.e.t.)	Stadium Racing Colmar (7)
43.	AS Blanc Vieux-Thann (8)	1–4	AS Illzach Modenheim (6)
44.	AGIIR Florival (8)	2–1	CS Mulhouse Bourtzwiller (8)
45.	FC Reguisheim (10)	0–2	AS Pfaffenheim (10)
46.	AS Lutterbach (9)	2–1	AS Turckheim (11)
47.	AS Berrwiller-Hartsmannswiller (7)	5–2 (a.e.t.)	AS Sundhoffen (7)
48.	US Wittenheim (7)	1–0	AS Raedersheim (8)
49.	US Gunsbach-Zimmerbach (10)	0–5	Racing HW 96 (8)
50.	SR Bergheim (10)	1–8	ASC Biesheim (5)
51.	FC Illhaeusern (7)	0–2	FC Bennwihr (7)
52.	FC Rouffach (11)	1–4	ASCA Wittelsheim (8)
53.	AS Sigolsheim (11)	2–0 (a.e.t.)	AS Blodelsheim (12)
54.	FC Ste Croix-en-Plaine (8)	4–1 (a.e.t.)	AS Red Star Mulhouse (9)
55.	AS Ribeauville (9)	1–0	FC Morschwiller-le-Bas (9)
56.	ASCCO Helfrantzkirch (11)	0–1 (a.e.t.)	FC Habsheim (9)
57.	ASL Kœtzingue (7)	5–4	FC Sierentz (7)
58.	FC Kappelen (10)	4–2 (a.e.t.)	AS Burnhaupt-le-Bas (10)
59.	FC Tagsdorf (10)	0–4	FC Kembs Réunis (7)
60.	SS Zillisheim (9)	3–4 (a.e.t.)	AS Huningue (8)
61.	Étoile Mulhouse (12)	0–4	FC Hagenthal-Wentzwiller (6)
62.	FC Pfastatt 1926 (8)	1–2	FC Riedisheim (8)
63.	AS Rixheim (9)	0–8	FC Hégenheim (6)
64.	US Azzurri Mulhouse (9)	0–4	FC Mulhouse (5)
65.	FC Hirtzbach (7)	4–4 (1–3 p)	Real Mulhouse CF (8)
66.	FC Burnhaupt-le-Haut (7)	2–3	FC Bantzenheim (8)
67.	Alliance Muespach-Folgensbourg (11)	2–5	AS Blotzheim (7)

=== Champagne-Ardenne ===
These matches were played on 10 September 2017.

Third round results: Champagne-Ardenne

Tie no	Home team (tier)	Score	Away team (tier)
1.	FC Bogny (8)	1–0	AS Tournes/Renwez/Les Mazures/Arreux/Montcornet (8)
2.	US Revin (9)	0–7	AS Prix-lès-Mézières (5)
3.	Le Theux FC (8)	2–2 (1–3 p)	USA Le Chesne (7)
4.	Cheveuges-St Aignan CO (10)	1–0	FC Blagny-Carignan (9)
5.	FC Porcien (9)	2–0 (a.e.t.)	Rethel SF (6)
6.	US Balan (10)	2–1	QV Douzy (8)
7.	JS Remilly-Aillicourt (10)	2–1	OFC Charleville (6)
8.	ES Charleville-Mézières (9)	1–1 (4–2 p)	ES Witry-les-Reims (8)
9.	US Avize-Grauves (7)	0–4	RC Épernay Champagne (5)
10.	AS Mourmelon-Livry-Bouy (10)	0–5	ASPTT Châlons (7)
11.	AS Cernay-Berru-Lavannes (8)	4–1	AS Courtisols ESTAN (9)
12.	Argonne FC (7)	0–2	SA Sézanne (6)
13.	EF Reims Sainte-Anne Châtillons (6)	4–2	SC Tinqueux (7)
14.	AS St Brice-Courcelles (10)	0–9	MJEP Cormontreuil (6)
15.	Reims Murigny Franco Portugais (9)	1–3	AS Taissy (7)
16.	AS Bignicourt-sur-Marne (12)	0–1	Foyer Compertrix (10)
17.	Vitry FC (7)	2–3	JS St Julien FC (7)
18.	Foyer Barsequanais (7)	5–0	ESC Melda (8)
19.	RC Sézanne (7)	2–0	Étoile Chapelaine (8)
20.	US Maizières-Chatres (8)	2–4	RCS La Chapelle (6)
21.	ES Connantre-Corroy (11)	1–6	AFM Romilly (7)
22.	JS Vaudoise (9)	1–4	Aube Sud Vanne Pays D'Othe (6)
23.	FC Nogentais (6)	6–0	CS Trois Vallées (9)
24.	Châlons FCO (7)	1–0	FC St Mesmin (6)
25.	Espérance St Dizier (9)	2–4 (a.e.t.)	US Montier-en-Der (8)
26.	AS Sarrey-Montigny (8)	2–0	FC Laville-aux-Bois (10)
27.	US Éclaron (6)	1–1 (5–3 p)	SL Ornel (7)
28.	Bar-sur-Aube FC (8)	0–1	Chaumont FC (6)
29.	USI Blaise (7)	1–3	FCA Troyes (6)
30.	ES Prauthoy-Vaux (9)	0–2 (a.e.t.)	SC Marnaval (7)
31.	Stade Chevillonnais (8)	2–0	FC Sts-Geosmois (7)

=== Lorraine ===
These matches were played between 9 and 10 September 2017.

Third round results: Lorraine

Tie no	Home team (tier)	Score	Away team (tier)
1.	CS Réhon (12)	1–3	AS Les Côteaux (10)
2.	Entente Bure-Boulange (10)	3–1	CS Godbrange (9)
3.	CS Volmerange-les-Mines (11)	3–5	ES Villerupt-Thil (7)
4.	AS Portugais St Francois Thionville (8)	1–4	CSO Amnéville (5)
5.	ES Gandrange (8)	2–1	JS Audunoise (9)
6.	AS Algrange (10)	0–1	Thionville FC (6)
7.	FC Angevillers (12)	3–4 (a.e.t.)	ES Longuyon (10)
8.	FC Hagondange (7)	2–2 (4–3 p)	CS Veymerange (7)
9.	USL Mont St Martin (9)	1–3	UL Rombas (8)
10.	US Ban-St Martin (10)	0–2	FC Verny-Louvigny-Cuvry (10)
11.	FC Yutz (7)	0–1	RS Amanvillers (6)
12.	FC Pierrevillers (10)	1–2	FC Devant-les-Ponts Metz (8)
13.	ASPF Ste Marie-aux-Chênes (12)	0–4	ESAP Metz (10)
14.	FC Hettange-Grande (9)	1–3	ES Woippy (9)
15.	ES Metz (8)	1–5	APM Metz (6)
16.	ASC Basse-Ham (10)	1–2	AS Montigny-lès-Metz (8)
17.	MJC Volmerange-lès-Boulay (9)	1–4	FC Trémery (5)
18.	US Valmont (11)	1–6	ES Fameck (7)
19.	USAG Uckange (7)	1–3 (a.e.t.)	US Behren-lès-Forbach (8)
20.	AS Le Val-de-Guéblange (10)	2–1	CS Diebling (10)
21.	USF Farébersviller (8)	0–2	RS Magny (6)
22.	FC Coume (10)	2–5	US Forbach (6)
23.	SO Ippling (9)	1–0	JS Rémering-lès-Hargarten (11)
24.	AS Falck (12)	1–4	ES Petite-Rosselle (9)
25.	ES Macheren Petit-Eversviller (9)	2–3 (a.e.t.)	UL Plantières Metz (7)
26.	SSEP Hombourg-Haut (10)	1–1 (4–2 p)	SO Merlebach (8)
27.	FC Carling (10)	2–4	Étoile Naborienne St Avold (6)
28.	ES Lunéville Sixte (9)	1–3	EF Delme-Solgne (10)
29.	ES Laneuveville (10)	1–1 (4–3 p)	US Vandœuvre (7)
30.	FC Toul (10)	1–1 (5–4 p)	GS Neuves-Maisons (7)
31.	FC St Max-Essey (9)	0–3	AS Haut-du-Lièvre Nancy (8)
32.	AC Blainville-Damelevières (8)	1–0	RC Champigneulles (6)
33.	AS Villey-St Étienne (8)	1–1 (4–5 p)	FC Dombasle-sur-Meurthe (8)
34.	ASC Saulxures-lès-Nancy (10)	0–2	ES Heillecourt (7)
35.	AS Grand Couronne (9)	2–5 (a.e.t.)	FC Pulnoy (8)
36.	SC Malzéville (11)	1–3	Jarville JF (6)
37.	Achen-Etting-Schmittviller (9)	2–2 (1–4 p)	FC Sarrebourg (6)
38.	US Soucht (9)	0–4	CA Boulay (7)
39.	AS Réding (9)	5–1	AS Montbronn (10)
40.	US Châtel-St Germain (9)	4–2	AS Bettborn Hellering (10)
41.	AS Mouterhouse (9)	4–2	Sportive Lorquinoise (10)
42.	FC Rohrbach-Bining (10)	1–6	US Nousseviller (8)
43.	AS Morhange (8)	1–4	Sarreguemines FC (5)
44.	FC Héming (12)	1–4	EF Turque Sarrebourg (8)
45.	FC Metzing (11)	2–1	Entente Petit-Rederching/Siersthal (11)
46.	LSC Portieux (12)	0–4	AS Girancourt-Dommartin-Chaumousey (8)
47.	AS Padoux (11)	2–5 (a.e.t.)	ES Thaon (6)
48.	AS Gironcourt (10)	0–2	AS Vagney (8)
49.	FC Haute Moselotte (10)	2–2 (4–3 p)	US Arches-Archettes-Raon (10)
50.	FC Ste Marguerite (9)	2–3 (a.e.t.)	SR Saint-Dié (7)
51.	ES Aviere Darnieulles (11)	2–1	FC Remiremont (10)
52.	ASC Kellermann (9)	5–0	FC Éloyes (8)
53.	ES Golbey (7)	2–3	FC Lunéville (5)
54.	Bulgnéville Contrex Vittel FC (9)	2–2 (2–3 p)	GS Haroué-Benney (8)
55.	AS Dommartin-lès-Toul (11)	0–3	SF Verdun Belleville (8)
56.	Entente Vigneulles-Hannonville-Fresne (8)	2–2 (4–3 p)	FC St Mihiel (8)
57.	US Thierville (10)	3–1 (a.e.t.)	CS Homécourt (7)
58.	CS&O Blénod-Pont-à-Mousson (7)	2–2 (4–3 p)	US Pagny-sur-Moselle (5)
59.	Toul JCA (10)	0–1	Bar-le-Duc FC (6)
60.	Lorraine Vaucoulers (11)	2–4	Entente Centre Ornain (9)
61.	AS Gondreville (9)	2–1	Entente Sorcy Void-Vacon (8)
62.	FC Écrouves (10)	3–4	FC Novéant (9)

== Fourth round ==
=== Alsace ===
These matches were played on 23 and 24 September 2017.

Fourth round results: Alsace

Tie no	Home team (tier)	Score	Away team (tier)
1.	FC Ste Croix-en-Plaine (8)	2–1 (4–3 p)	ASPV Strasbourg (6)
2.	FCSR Haguenau (5)	2–0	US Sarre-Union (5)
3.	FC Hégenheim (6)	4–0	ASL Kœtzingue (7)
4.	AS Sigolsheim (11)	1–3	FC Geispolsheim 01 (7)
5.	FC Riedisheim (8)	0–3	FC Saint-Louis Neuweg (4)
6.	FC Bennwihr (7)	1–0	Racing HW 96 (8)
7.	AS Menora Strasbourg (7)	1–0	FC Soleil Bischheim (6)
8.	US Turcs Bischwiller (9)	1–5	FCE Schirrhein (6)
9.	CS Strasbourg Neuhof (9)	1–3 (a.e.t.)	US Ittenheim (8)
10.	AS Huningue (8)	2–0 (a.e.t.)	FC Hagenthal-Wentzwiller (6)
11.	SR Hoenheim (9)	1–1 (3–2 p)	FC Drusenheim (8)
12.	FC Wingersheim (10)	1–2	FR Sessenheim-Stattmatten (10)
13.	SC Dettwiller (11)	0–4	FC Obermodern (6)
14.	CS Waldhambach (10)	0–5	AS Hochfelden (8)
15.	Real Mulhouse CF (8)	1–4	FC Mulhouse (5)
16.	FC Kembs Réunis (7)	8–0	ASCA Wittelsheim (8)
17.	FC Bantzenheim (8)	3–2	AS Lutterbach (9)
18.	FC Habsheim (9)	5–0	AS Pfaffenheim (10)
19.	AS Ribeauville (9)	1–2 (a.e.t.)	FC Kappelen (10)
20.	AS Illzach Modenheim (6)	1–0	AS Berrwiller-Hartsmannswiller (7)
21.	FC St Etienne Seltz (7)	1–3	FC Saverne (7)
22.	AS Musau Strasbourg (12)	2–1	FC Rhinau (10)
23.	AS Bischoffsheim (8)	1–1 (11–12 p)	CS Fegersheim (9)
24.	AS Sermersheim (9)	0–1	US Wittenheim (7)
25.	FC Kronenbourg Strasbourg (6)	1–2 (a.e.t.)	ASC Biesheim (5)
26.	US Baldenheim (9)	0–0 (6–5 p)	FA Illkirch Graffenstaden (6)
27.	FC Still 1930 (8)	1–0	FCSR Obernai (6)
28.	ALFC Duttlenheim (7)	0–6	Stadium Racing Colmar (7)
29.	US Hindisheim (8)	0–2	SC Schiltigheim (4)
30.	FC Ecrivains-Schiltigheim-Bischheim (10)	1–5	AS Gambsheim (8)
31.	SR Furdenheim (9)	5–3	FC Schweighouse-sur-Moder (9)
32.	AS Platania Gundershoffen (8)	3–3 (4–2 p)	AS Hunspach (8)
33.	FC Steinseltz (8)	1–2	US Reipertswiller (6)
34.	AS Blotzheim (7)	1–2	AGIIR Florival (8)

=== Champagne-Ardenne ===
These matches were played on 24 September 2017.

Fourth round results: Champagne-Ardenne

Tie no	Home team (tier)	Score	Away team (tier)
1.	EF Reims Sainte-Anne Châtillons (6)	0–2	CS Sedan Ardennes (4)
2.	RCS La Chapelle (6)	1–2	AFM Romilly (7)
3.	RC Épernay Champagne (5)	2–1	US Éclaron (6)
4.	Chaumont FC (6)	3–2	FC Nogentais (6)
5.	SC Marnaval (7)	2–1	Foyer Barsequanais (7)
6.	US Montier-en-Der (8)	1–1 (3–5 p)	AS Sarrey-Montigny (8)
7.	FCA Troyes (6)	3–0	Aube Sud Vanne Pays D'Othe (6)
8.	Stade Chevillonnais (8)	5–0	Foyer Compertrix (10)
9.	FC Porcien (9)	2–1	AS Cernay-Berru-Lavannes (8)
10.	USA Le Chesne (7)	0–1	FC Bogny (8)
11.	AS Prix-lès-Mézières (5)	1–1 (4–2 p)	SA Sézanne (6)
12.	US Balan (10)	2–3	Châlons FCO (7)
13.	ES Charleville-Mézières (9)	2–3 (a.e.t.)	MJEP Cormontreuil (6)
14.	RC Sézanne (7)	7–1	Cheveuges-St Aignan CO (10)
15.	JS Remilly-Aillicourt (10)	1–3	AS Taissy (7)
16.	JS St Julien FC (7)	1–2	ASPTT Châlons (7)

=== Lorraine ===
These matches were played on 23 and 24 September 2017.

Fourth round results: Lorraine

Tie no	Home team (tier)	Score	Away team (tier)
1.	AS Mouterhouse (9)	0–4	Sarreguemines FC (5)
2.	FC Sarrebourg (6)	1–2	ES Thaon (6)
3.	SF Verdun Belleville (8)	3–4	Entente Vigneulles-Hannonville-Fresne (8)
4.	FC Pulnoy (8)	0–3	US Raon-l'Étape (4)
5.	AS Haut-du-Lièvre Nancy (8)	1–0	Bar-le-Duc FC (6)
6.	Entente Centre Ornain (9)	2–1	Jarville JF (6)
7.	ESAP Metz (10)	2–4 (a.e.t.)	ES Heillecourt (7)
8.	AS Montigny-lès-Metz (8)	2–0	FC Dombasle-sur-Meurthe (8)
9.	FC Novéant (9)	3–1	AC Blainville-Damelevières (8)
10.	EF Delme-Solgne (10)	2–4 (a.e.t.)	CS&O Blénod-Pont-à-Mousson (7)
11.	AS Gondreville (9)	2–4	SR Saint-Dié (7)
12.	ES Laneuveville (10)	1–2	AS Vagney (8)
13.	FC Haute Moselotte (10)	4–1	AS Réding (9)
14.	FC Toul (10)	1–2	AS Girancourt-Dommartin-Chaumousey (8)
15.	ASC Kellermann (9)	0–1	FC Lunéville (5)
16.	EF Turque Sarrebourg (8)	0–5	SAS Épinal (4)
17.	FC Verny-Louvigny-Cuvry (10)	1–1 (0–3 p)	RS Magny (6)
18.	ES Fameck (7)	2–3	US Forbach (6)
19.	US Châtel-St Germain (9)	0–5	CSO Amnéville (6)
20.	ES Longuyon (10)	0–2	UL Rombas (8)
21.	ES Woippy (9)	3–2	ES Villerupt-Thil (7)
22.	ES Gandrange (8)	1–5	FC Trémery (5)
23.	SSEP Hombourg-Haut (10)	1–2	APM Metz (6)
24.	FC Devant-les-Ponts Metz (8)	4–3	US Nousseviller (8)
25.	US Behren-lès-Forbach (8)	0–2	UL Plantières Metz (7)
26.	FC Metzing (11)	2–0	CA Boulay (7)
27.	US Thierville (10)	1–7	Thionville FC (6)
28.	ES Petite-Rosselle (9)	2–0	SO Ippling (9)
29.	AS Le Val-de-Guéblange (10)	0–8	Étoile Naborienne St Avold (6)
30.	ES Aviere Darnieulles (11)	0–0 (4–5 p)	GS Haroué-Benney (8)
31.	Entente Bure-Boulange (10)	1–4	RS Amanvillers (6)
32.	AS Les Côteaux (10)	3–1	FC Hagondange (7)

== Intermediate round ==
=== Alsace ===
These matches were played on 1 October 2017.

Intermediate round results: Alsace

Tie no	Home team (tier)	Score	Away team (tier)
1.	FC Ste Croix-en-Plaine (8)	0–2	FC Bennwihr (7)
2.	AS Strasbourg (9)	0–2	AS Hochfelden (8)
3.	FC Kappelen (10)	0–2	AGIIR Florival (8)

== Fifth round ==
=== Alsace ===
These matches were played on 7 and 8 October 2017.

Fifth round results: Alsace

Tie no	Home team (tier)	Score	Away team (tier)
1.	US Reipertswiller (6)	3–1	Stadium Racing Colmar (7)
2.	FC Saverne (7)	1–3	AGIIR Florival (8)
3.	CS Fegersheim (9)	0–0 (7–6 p)	AS Menora Strasbourg (7)
4.	AS Hochfelden (8)	0–2	US Ittenheim (8)
5.	US Wittenheim (7)	3–5	FC Kembs Réunis (7)
6.	AS Platania Gundershoffen (8)	0–5	FC Mulhouse (5)
7.	AS Musau Strasbourg (12)	0–12	FCSR Haguenau (5)
8.	AS Gambsheim (8)	0–1	AS Illzach Modenheim (6)
9.	FC Bantzenheim (8)	4–0	FC Habsheim (9)
10.	AS Huningue (8)	3–1	US Baldenheim (9)
11.	FR Sessenheim-Stattmatten (10)	0–3	FC Geispolsheim 01 (7)
12.	FC Bennwihr (7)	0–3	SC Schiltigheim (4)
13.	SR Furdenheim (9)	2–4 (a.e.t.)	ASC Biesheim (5)
14.	FC Obermodern (6)	0–2 (a.e.t.)	FC Hégenheim (6)
15.	FCE Schirrhein (6)	3–6	FC Saint-Louis Neuweg (4)
16.	FC Still 1930 (8)	3–0	SR Hoenheim (9)

=== Champagne-Ardenne ===
These matches were played on 8 October 2017.

Fifth round results: Champagne-Ardenne

Tie no	Home team (tier)	Score	Away team (tier)
1.	AS Taissy (7)	0–1	FCA Troyes (6)
2.	AFM Romilly (7)	0–3	MJEP Cormontreuil (6)
3.	FC Porcien (9)	2–0	ASPTT Châlons (7)
4.	FC Bogny (8)	4–3 (a.e.t.)	Stade Chevillonnais (8)
5.	Châlons FCO (7)	3–0	AS Sarrey-Montigny (8)
6.	CS Sedan Ardennes (4)	0–1	AS Prix-lès-Mézières (5)
7.	SC Marnaval (7)	0–2	Chaumont FC (6)
8.	RC Sézanne (7)	0–3	RC Épernay Champagne (5)

=== Lorraine ===
These matches were played on 7 and 8 October 2017.

Fifth round results: Lorraine

Tie no	Home team (tier)	Score	Away team (tier)
1.	CS&O Blénod-Pont-à-Mousson (7)	1–2	FC Trémery (5)
2.	AS Les Côteaux (10)	0–6	US Raon-l'Étape (4)
3.	FC Metzing (11)	1–0	ES Woippy (9)
4.	Entente Centre Ornain (9)	0–2	CSO Amnéville (5)
5.	AS Haut-du-Lièvre Nancy (8)	0–2	APM Metz (6)
6.	GS Haroué-Benney (8)	2–0	ES Heillecourt (7)
7.	AS Girancourt-Dommartin-Chaumousey (8)	3–4	AS Vagney (8)
8.	Entente Vigneulles-Hannonville-Fresne (8)	1–4	FC Lunéville (5)
9.	FC Haute Moselotte (10)	1–5	SR Saint-Dié (7)
10.	FC Novéant (9)	0–3	ES Thaon (6)
11.	RS Amanvillers (6)	2–0	Thionville FC (6)
12.	UL Rombas (8)	4–4 (4–3 p)	ES Petite-Rosselle (9)
13.	FC Devant-les-Ponts Metz (8)	0–7	Sarreguemines FC (5)
14.	AS Montigny-lès-Metz (8)	1–2	US Forbach (6)
15.	UL Plantières Metz (7)	1–2	Étoile Naborienne St Avold (6)
16.	RS Magny (6)	0–3	SAS Épinal (4)

== Sixth round ==
The three sectors in Grand Est region were combined for the sixth round.

These matches were played on 21 and 22 October 2017.

Sixth round results: Grand Est

Tie no	Home team (tier)	Score	Away team (tier)
1.	Sarreguemines FC (5)	0–2	ASC Biesheim (5)
2.	AS Huningue (8)	0–6	FCSR Haguenau (5)
3.	ES Thaon (6)	2–1	AS Prix-lès-Mézières (5)
4.	FC Mulhouse (5)	1–1 (5–4 p)	FC Lunéville (5)
5.	AGIIR Florival (8)	0–2	SC Schiltigheim (4)
6.	FC Still 1930 (8)	2–0 (a.e.t.)	CS Fegersheim (9)
7.	FC Geispolsheim 01 (7)	2–1	US Reipertswiller (6)
8.	FC Metzing (11)	0–2	US Raon-l'Étape (4)
9.	FC Kembs Réunis (7)	1–2	FC Hégenheim (6)
10.	US Forbach (6)	2–1 (a.e.t.)	AS Illzach Modenheim (6)
11.	APM Metz (6)	0–1 (a.e.t.)	FC Saint-Louis Neuweg (4)
12.	FC Bogny (8)	0–5	Étoile Naborienne St Avold (6)
13.	FCA Troyes (6)	4–1	Châlons FCO (7)
14.	UL Rombas (8)	2–1	MJEP Cormontreuil (6)
15.	SR Saint-Dié (7)	0–6	CSO Amnéville (6)
16.	FC Porcien (9)	0–1	Chaumont FC (6)
17.	GS Haroué-Benney (8)	0–7	SAS Épinal (4)
18.	FC Trémery (5)	2–0	RS Amanvillers (6)
19.	AS Vagney (8)	2–3	RC Épernay Champagne (5)
20.	US Ittenheim (8)	5–1	FC Bantzenheim (8)
