= 2009–10 Championnat de France Amateur 2 =

Championnat de France amateur 2
- Season: 2009–10
- Champions: Metz B
- Promoted: Aubervilliers; Avion; Béziers; Calais; Le Poiré-sur-Vie; Lorient B AS Monaco B Monts d'Or Azergues; Saint-Étienne B Saint-Pryvé Saint-Hilaire; Uzès Pont du Gard
- Relegated: Ajaccio B Amiens SC B Andrézieux B Bassin d'Arcachon; Bayonne B Beaune; Besançon B Blois; Chaumont; Écommoy; Gonfreville; Issy; L'Entente SSG B Saint-Lô; Marnaval; Menton; Nevers; Sens; Tinqueux; Thionville; Thouars; Tournefeuille

The 2009–10 Championnat de France Amateurs 2 season was the 12th edition of the competition since its establishment. The competition officially began on 15 August and ended in May 2010. The competition consisted of 128 clubs spread into 8 parallel groups of 16. It was open to reserve teams in France and amateur clubs in France, however, unlike the preceding league Championnat de France amateur, both the reserve and amateur clubs are eligible for promotion to the next league, the Championnat de France amateur. The highest-placed team in each pool are promoted, replaced by the 3 lowest-placed in the Championnat de France amateur.

== DNCG Rulings ==
All clubs that secured CFA 2 status for this season were subject to approval by the DNCG before becoming eligible to participate.

Following the DNCG's annual report on clubs, on 25 June, it was announced that three clubs had been relegated from the National to the CFA 2. Besançon RC, US Luzenac, and FC Rouen, who were all promoted to the Championnat National, were relegated due to financial abnormalities in their accounts. All clubs relegated were allowed to appeal the decision.

Following an appeal from the aforementioned clubs, the CNOSF determined that Besançon should be relegated to the CFA and not CFA 2. FC Rouen and US Luzenac had their appeals overturned meaning they would remain in the Championnat National.

On 29 July, the French Football Federation unanimously suspended newly promoted CFA club Toulouse Rodéo FC from the league and to the CFA 2 following abnormalities detected in the club's use of non-licensed players. The club was replaced by Red Star Saint-Ouen, who were relegated from the CFA last year.

On 6 August, just three days before the start of the season, the CNSOF ruled that CFA 2 club Olympique Saumur would be allowed promotion to the CFA on the assumption that the club was ranked second behind Les Herbiers VF in terms of the promotion chart following a current CFA club's relegation by means of a federation ruling. With Besançon's relegation to the CFA, it has been determined that two groups would have an allocation of 20 clubs, while one group would have an allocation of 19 clubs. Due to the sudden circumstances, on 7 August, the FFF devised a brand new schedule for the CFA. The federation also announced that they had rejected the CNOSF's proposal for integrating Saumur into the CFA. Saumur responding by announcing their intent to appeal the judgment in Administrative Court.

== League tables ==
Last updated: 2 June 2010

=== Group A ===
Pos	Team	Pld	W	D	L	GF	GA	GD	Pts	Promotion or relegation
1	Calais (D)	30	16	8	6	46	21	+25	86	Denied promotion to 2010–11 Championnat de France amateur
2	Oissel (D)	30	15	7	8	41	35	+6	82	Denied promotion to 2010–11 Championnat de France amateur
3	Poissy (P)	30	13	10	7	48	35	+13	79	Promotion to 2010–11 Championnat de France amateur
4	Évreux	30	13	8	9	30	33	−3	77	
5	Hazebrouck	30	12	8	10	41	34	+7	74	
6	Dieppe	30	12	8	10	43	36	+7	74	
7	Saint-Omer	30	12	8	10	35	34	+1	74	
8	Wasquehal	30	10	11	9	32	28	+4	71	
9	Pacy Vallée-d'Eure Reserves	30	11	8	11	32	32	0	71	
10	Bastia Reserves	30	10	10	10	40	33	+7	70	
11	Gravelines	30	11	7	12	36	36	0	70	
12	AC Amiens	30	10	9	11	39	38	+1	69	
13	Dreux	30	10	8	12	31	30	+1	68	
14	Amiens SC Reserves (R)	30	6	12	12	25	38	−13	60	Relegation to Division d'Honneur
15	Gonfreville (R)	30	8	5	17	25	49	−24	59	Relegation to Division d'Honneur
16	L'Entente SSG Reserves (R)	30	5	7	18	25	57	−32	52	Relegation to Division d'Honneur

(D) Disqualified; (P) Promoted; (R) Relegated

=== Group B ===
Pos	Team	Pld	W	D	L	GF	GA	GD	Pts	Promotion or relegation
1	Aubervilliers (P)	30	19	9	2	57	21	+36	96	Promotion to Championnat de France amateur
2	Avion (P)	30	17	7	6	63	24	+39	88	Promotion to Championnat de France amateur
3	Feignies	30	14	9	7	45	31	+14	81	
4	Arras	30	12	14	4	37	25	+12	80	
5	Roye	30	13	7	10	41	32	+9	76	
6	Valenciennes Reserves	30	13	7	10	34	23	+11	76	
7	Sedan Reserves	30	12	9	9	44	36	+8	75	
8	Reims Reserves	30	13	5	12	46	38	+8	74	
9	Saint-Dizier	30	11	6	13	28	37	−9	69	
10	Lesquin	30	11	6	13	34	43	−9	69	
11	Beauvais Reserves	30	10	8	12	38	34	+4	68	
12	Créteil Reserves	30	10	7	13	57	46	+11	67	
13	Les Lilas	30	10	6	14	39	43	−4	66	
14	Sens (R)	29	9	5	15	34	53	−19	61	Relegation to Division d'Honneur
15	Tinqueux (R)	30	3	8	19	18	53	−35	47	Relegation to Division d'Honneur
16	Marnaval (R)	28	4	2	22	23	78	−55	42	Relegation to Division d'Honneur

(P) Promoted; (R) Relegated

=== Group C ===
Pos	Team	Pld	W	D	L	GF	GA	GD	Pts	Promotion or relegation
1	Metz Reserves (C, P)	30	24	5	1	67	21	+46	107	Promotion to Championnat de France amateur
2	Belfort	30	16	8	6	50	23	+27	86	
3	Troyes Reserves	30	15	6	9	58	40	+18	81	
4	Auxerre Reserves	30	12	12	6	60	37	+23	78	
5	Pontarlier	30	12	11	7	46	35	+11	77	
6	Jarville	30	11	10	9	49	48	+1	73	
7	Selongey	30	11	8	11	36	47	−11	71	
8	Saint-Louis Neuweg	30	10	10	10	34	42	−8	70	
9	Illzach Modenheim	30	11	8	11	43	45	−2	71	
10	Sarre-Union	30	9	9	12	49	55	−6	66	
11	Saint-Dié	30	6	17	7	38	42	−4	65	
12	Vauban Strasbourg	30	6	13	11	32	41	−9	61	
13	Neuves-Maisons	30	6	12	12	35	47	−12	60	
14	Chaumont (R)	30	7	8	15	31	54	−23	59	Relegation to Division d'Honneur
15	Besançon Reserves (R)	30	7	7	16	38	42	−4	58	Relegation to Division d'Honneur
16	Thionville (R)	30	3	7	20	28	71	−43	46	Relegation to Division d'Honneur

(C) Champions; (P) Promoted; (R) Relegated

=== Group D ===
Pos	Team	Pld	W	D	L	GF	GA	GD	Pts	Promotion or relegation
1	Monts d'Or Azergues (P)	30	21	2	7	51	27	+24	95	Promotion to Championnat de France amateur
2	Saint-Étienne Reserves (P)	30	17	8	5	60	21	+39	89	Promotion to Championnat de France amateur
3	Feurs	30	19	3	8	45	35	+10	90	
4	Clermont Reserves	30	14	7	9	48	34	+14	79	
5	Saint-Priest	30	12	12	6	40	29	+11	78	
6	Chambéry	30	13	7	10	49	38	+11	76	
7	Cournon	30	12	9	9	33	29	+4	75	
8	Thiers	30	12	8	10	32	25	+7	74	
9	Vénissieux	30	10	11	9	40	35	+5	71	
10	Dijon Reserves	30	11	7	12	46	44	+2	70	
11	Imphy Decize	29	8	8	13	32	42	−10	61	
12	Échirolles	30	7	10	13	30	35	−5	61	
13	Ornans	30	7	10	13	35	52	−17	61	
14	Andrézieux Reserves (R)	30	6	12	12	30	42	−12	60	Relegation to Division d'Honneur
15	Nevers (R)	30	3	12	15	29	53	−24	51	Relegation to Division d'Honneur
16	Beaune (R)	30	2	6	22	23	81	−58	42	Relegation to Division d'Honneur

(P) Promoted; (R) Relegated

=== Group E ===
Pos	Team	Pld	W	D	L	GF	GA	GD	Pts	Promotion or relegation
1	AS Monaco Reserves (P)	30	17	9	4	57	27	+30	90	Promotion to Championnat de France amateur
2	Uzès Pont du Gard (P)	30	18	4	8	57	24	+33	88	Promotion to Championnat de France amateur
3	Grasse	30	15	5	10	38	34	+4	80	
4	Calvi	30	12	13	5	45	34	+11	79	
5	Marseille Consolat	30	13	5	12	42	48	−6	74	
6	La Valette	30	11	9	10	33	36	−3	72	
7	Gardanne	30	12	6	12	35	39	−4	72	
8	Trinité Sport	30	12	5	13	43	45	−2	71	
9	Fréjus Reserves	30	11	8	11	43	40	+3	71	
10	Corte	30	12	5	13	40	47	−7	71	
11	Nice Reserves	30	11	7	12	39	30	+9	70	
12	Nîmes Reserves	30	11	6	13	39	39	0	69	
13	Furiani-Agliani	30	13	3	14	34	47	−13	72	
14	Marseille Reserves	30	9	7	14	29	36	−7	64	
15	Ajaccio Reserves (R)	30	6	8	16	34	53	−19	56	Relegation to Division d'Honneur
16	Menton (R)	30	5	7	18	22	49	−27	52	Relegation to Division d'Honneur

(P) Promoted; (R) Relegated

=== Group F ===
Pos	Team	Pld	W	D	L	GF	GA	GD	Pts	Promotion or relegation
1	Béziers (P)	30	20	5	5	63	36	+27	95	Promotion to Championnat de France amateur
2	Tarbes	30	17	7	6	53	33	+20	88	
3	Toulouse Reserves	30	14	9	7	43	28	+15	81	
4	Trélissac	30	15	4	11	51	38	+13	79	
5	Bergerac	30	12	8	10	45	34	+11	74	
6	Agen	30	11	10	9	33	27	+6	73	
7	Mont-de-Marsan	30	10	10	10	36	37	−1	70	
8	Cognac	30	11	7	12	50	48	+2	70	
9	Blagnac	30	10	9	11	42	41	+1	69	
10	Bordelais	30	10	9	11	35	28	+7	69	
11	Saint-Alban	30	8	11	11	37	49	−12	65	
12	Mérignac	30	9	9	12	29	46	−17	66	
13	Cugnaux	30	9	7	14	27	45	−18	64	
14	Tournefeuille (R)	30	7	9	14	35	51	−16	60	Relegation to Division d'Honneur
15	Bayonne Reserves (R)	30	6	10	14	41	58	−17	58	Relegation to Division d'Honneur
16	Arcachon (R)	30	6	6	18	38	60	−22	54	Relegation to Division d'Honneur

(P) Promoted; (R) Relegated

=== Group G ===
Pos	Team	Pld	W	D	L	GF	GA	GD	Pts	Promotion or relegation
1	Le Poiré-sur-Vie (P)	30	19	6	5	52	27	+25	93	Promotion to Championnat de France amateur
2	Saint-Pryvé Saint-Hilaire (P)	30	17	10	3	54	34	+20	91	Promotion to Championnat de France amateur
3	Saumur	30	12	10	8	47	37	+10	76	
4	Angers Reserves	30	13	5	12	51	44	+7	74	
5	Châteauroux Reserves	30	12	7	11	40	34	+6	73	
6	Nantes Reserves	30	11	10	9	40	35	+5	73	
7	Cholet	30	11	7	12	39	36	+3	70	
8	Poitiers	30	9	12	9	38	38	0	69	
9	Tours Reserves	30	10	11	9	47	40	+7	71	
10	Sainte-Geneviève	30	10	8	12	32	36	−4	68	
11	Châtellerault	30	9	10	11	38	47	−9	67	
12	Bourges	30	8	12	10	31	38	−7	66	
13	Niort Reserves	30	8	11	11	34	38	−4	65	
14	Thouars (R)	30	8	7	15	39	53	−14	61	Relegation to Division d'Honneur
15	Blois (R)	30	7	8	15	31	49	−18	59	Relegation to Division d'Honneur
16	Issy (R)	30	8	4	18	27	51	−24	58	Relegation to Division d'Honneur

(P) Promoted; (R) Relegated

=== Group H ===
Pos	Team	Pld	W	D	L	GF	GA	GD	Pts	Promotion or relegation
1	Lorient Reserves (P)	30	17	8	5	70	32	+38	89	Promotion to Championnat de France amateur
2	Guingamp Reserves	30	16	9	5	44	24	+20	87	
3	Concarneau	30	15	6	9	43	28	+15	81	
4	Dives	30	12	10	8	44	40	+4	76	
5	Changé	30	13	7	10	41	48	−7	76	
6	Alençon	30	11	10	9	33	29	+4	73	
7	Montagnarde	30	11	9	10	39	34	+5	72	
8	Vertou	30	12	6	12	32	32	0	72	
9	Brest Reserves	30	12	5	13	45	37	+8	71	
10	Saint-Malo	30	11	7	12	34	32	+2	70	
11	Laval Reserves	30	11	5	14	36	39	−3	68	
12	Mondeville	30	10	8	12	47	46	+1	68	
13	Vitré	30	9	9	12	41	35	+6	66	
14	La Chapelle-des-Marais	30	9	9	12	33	39	−6	66	
15	Saint-Lô Manche (R)	30	8	9	13	48	55	−7	63	Relegation to Division d'Honneur
16	Écommoy (R)	30	3	5	22	17	98	−81	44	Relegation to Division d'Honneur

(P) Promoted; (R) Relegated

=== Second-place promotion ===
Along with the group winners, the top four second-place clubs in CFA 2 earn promotion to the CFA.

Grp	Team	Pld	W	D	L	GF	GA	GD	Pts
G	Saint-Pryvé Saint-Hilaire	30	17	10	3	54	34	+20	91
D	Saint-Étienne Reserves	30	17	8	5	60	21	+39	89
B	Avion	30	17	7	6	63	24	+39	88
E	Uzès Pont du Gard	30	18	4	8	57	24	+33	88
F	Tarbes	30	17	7	6	53	33	+20	88
H	Guingamp Reserves	30	16	9	5	44	24	+20	87
C	Belfort	30	16	8	6	50	23	+27	86
A	Oissel	30	15	7	8	41	35	+6	82
