= SO Merlebach =

French football club

- Full name: Stade Olympique de Merlebach
- Founded: 1925
- Ground: Stade Philippe Schuth, Freyming-Merlebach
- League: Promotion d'Honneur (Lorraine) Group B
- Website: http://www.so-merlebach.com

Stade Olympique de Merlebach, commonly known as SO Merlebach, is a French association football club based in the commune of Freyming-Merlebach in the Moselle department of north-east France. Founded in 1925, the club has spent most of its existence in the regional divisions of French football, although they did compete in Division 2 in the 1970–71 season.

The club fields teams in a variety of age groups, from under-7s to the senior men's team, which as of 2015 plays in the Promotion d'Honneur de Lorraine, the eighth tier in the French league system. The senior team also regularly enters the Coupe de France.
