= AS Taissy =

French football club

- Full name: Association Sportive de Taissy Saint-Léonard
- Nicknames: I Turchini, I Lioni di Furiani, Les Bleus
- Founded: 25 August 1990
- Ground: Stade Jules-Vastag
- Capacity: 1,500
- Chairman: Christian Grosjean
- Manager: Cedric Tisseron; Quentin Rogier
- League: Division d'honneur
- 2009–10: Division d'honneur

Association Sportive Taissy is a French association football team.

== History ==
The club was founded on August 25, 1909. They are based in Taissy, France and had been playing in the Championnat de France Amateurs 2 Group A, the fifth tier in the French football league system. They play at the Stade Municipal Jules Vastag in Taissy.

=== Honours ===
- Champion de DH Champagne-Ardenne: 2004
- Champion de DHR: 2002
- Champion de PL: 2000

=== Notable coaches ===
- Quentin Rogier
- Alphonse Tchami
- Jérôme Velfert

== Sponsor ==
- RM IMMO
