= SC Marnaval =

French football club

- Full name: Sporting Marnaval Club
- Founded: 1940
- Ground: Stade des Aciéries; Saint-Dizier, France
- Capacity: 1,000
- Chairman: Claude Reb
- Manager: Christophe Legros
- League: Championnat de France Amateurs 2 Group B
- 2009-10: Championnat de France Amateurs 2 Group B, TBD
Home colours	Away colours

Sporting Marnaval Club is a French association football club founded in 1940. They are based in the town of Marnaval, located in the commune of Saint-Dizier in the Haute-Marne department and are currently playing in the Championnat de France Amateurs 2 Group B, the fifth tier of the French football league system. They play at the Stade des Aciéries in Saint-Dizier.
