= GS Neuves-Maisons =

French sports club

Neuves-Maisons
- Full name: Groupe Sportif Neuves-Maisons
- Founded: 1907
- Ground: Stade Municipal André Courrier, Neuves-Maisons
- Chairman: Sylvain François
- Manager: Pierre Etienne-Verrier
- League: CFA 2
Home colours

Groupe Sportive de Neuves-Maisons is a French sports club founded in 1907. The club is based in the commune of Neuves-Maisons and their home stadium is the Stade Municipal André Courrier. As of the 2009–10 season, the club's association football team competes in the Championnat de France amateur 2 Group C.
