= Jarville JF =

French football club

Jarville Jeunesse Foot is a French association football club. They are based in Jarville-la-Malgrange, Lorraine, France, and as of the 2023–24 season, playing in Régional 1 Grand Est, the sixth tier in the French football league system.

== Coupe de France ==
Jarville has achieved notable success in the Coupe de France during recent years, reaching the 1/16-finals in the 2006–07 edition (losing 5–3 to FC Libourne) and the 1/32-finals in the 2010–11 edition (losing 1–0 to FC Sochaux-Montbéliard). Other notable performances include: reaching the 7th round of the 2005–06 Coupe de France, where the club lost 5–1 to SR Colmar, and reaching the 8th round of the 2007–08 Coupe de France, losing 3–1 to AS Troyes.
