= SC Tinqueux =

French association football club

- Full name: Sporting Club de Tinqueux
- Founded: 1968
- Dissolved: 2019
- Ground: Stade de la Muire; Tinqueux, France
- Capacity: 250
Home colours	Away colours

Sporting Club de Tinqueux was a French association football club founded in 1968. They were based in the commune of Tinqueux, located in the region of Champagne-Ardenne in the Marne department. They played in Championnat de France Amateurs 2 Group B, the fifth tier of the French football league system, in the 2009–10 season. They played at the Stade de la Muire, which seats only 250 spectators, but can accommodate up to 200 more if necessary.

The club was dissolved in December 2019.
