= Guirane N'Daw =

Senegalese footballer (born 1984)

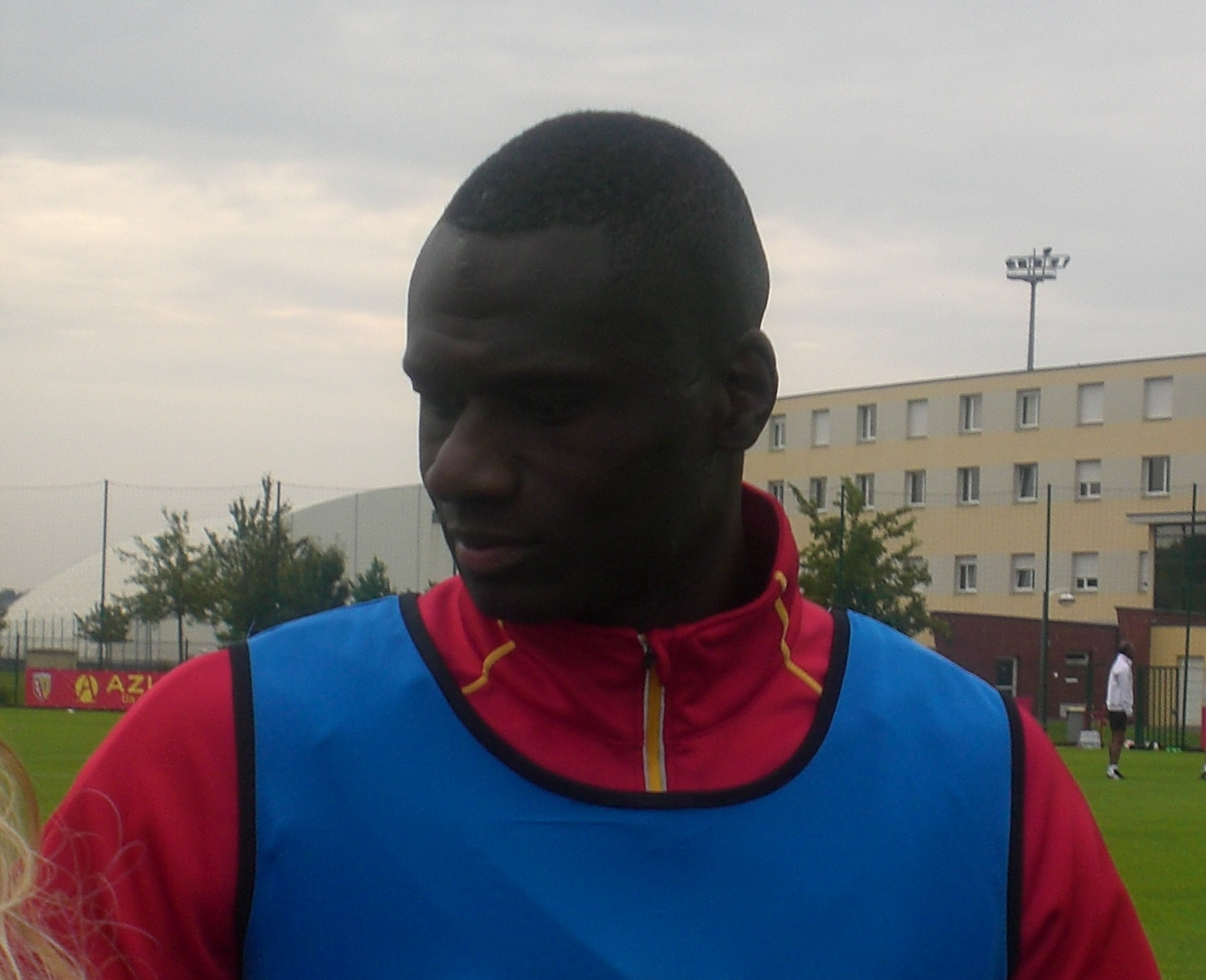
- N'Daw at Lens training in 2015

Personal information
- Date of birth: 24 April 1984 (age 42) (disputed)
- Place of birth: Rufisque, Senegal
- Height: 1.90 m (6 ft 3 in)
- Position: Defensive midfielder

Team information
- Current team: Algrange

Youth career
- –2002: Sochaux

Senior career*
Years	Team	Apps	(Gls)
2002–2008	Sochaux	122	(5)
2008–2010	Nantes	32	(3)
2009–2010	→ Saint-Étienne (loan)	34	(0)
2010–2013	Saint-Étienne	25	(0)
2010	Saint-Étienne B	4	(1)
2011	→ Zaragoza (loan)	19	(0)
2011–2012	→ Birmingham City (loan)	19	(0)
2012–2013	→ Ipswich Town (loan)	34	(1)
2013–2014	Asteras Tripolis	29	(3)
2014–2015	Metz	27	(0)
2015–2016	Lens	9	(0)
2019–	Algrange		

International career
2005–2012	Senegal	41	(4)
- * Club domestic league appearances and goals

Guirane N'Daw (born 24 April 1984) is a Senegalese former professional footballer who plays as a defensive midfielder for AS Algrange. He played for Sochaux, Nantes, Saint-Étienne, and Lens in France, for Zaragoza in Spain, for Birmingham City and Ipswich Town in England, and for Asteras Tripolis in Greece.

== Club career ==
N'Daw began his career with Sochaux. He appeared in over 120 matches, which included the 2007 Coupe de France Final as Sochaux beat Marseille on penalties, and scored five goals for the club before moving to Nantes in 2008. After Nantes were relegated to Ligue 2 at the end of his first season with the club, N'Daw joined Saint-Étienne on loan for the 2009–10 Ligue 1 season. The deal included a clause by which the move would be made permanent if Saint-Étienne retained their top-flight status. After a successful campaign, the loan was made permanent for a fee of €4 million. On 24 January 2011, N'Daw joined Spanish club Real Zaragoza on loan until the end of the season.

On 23 August 2011, N'Daw joined English Championship (second-tier) club Birmingham City on loan until January 2012, with an option to extend the contract until the end of the season. He made his debut for the club in a 3–1 defeat to Braga in the group stages of the Europa League. After several Europa League appearances, N'Daw finally made his Football League debut as a second-half substitute in a 2–1 defeat at Hull City in December. He established himself alongside Keith Fahey in Birmingham's midfield, and shortly before he left for the 2012 Africa Cup of Nations, his loan was extended to the end of the season.

Following Senegal's early elimination from the tournament, N'Daw's form and fitness levels dipped. He suffered recurrent hamstring injuries, including one sustained after 67 minutes of the visit to West Ham United in early April, in which he produced a strong performance protecting his defence. He returned for the play-off semi-final at Blackpool alongside Jordon Mutch, also coming back from injury, but was "rusty and lacked sharpness to impose", and the pairing gave the ball away too much. In the home leg, he came on for the injured Jonathan Spector, and helped his team stage a recovery from two goals behind to draw the match but lose the play-off on aggregate. Over the season, he made 29 appearances, of which 19 were in the league, without scoring.

N'Daw joined English Championship club Ipswich Town on 24 August 2012 on loan for the 2012–13 season.

After his Saint-Étienne contract expired, N'Daw signed a one-year deal with Super League Greece club Asteras Tripolis on 4 September 2013.

In summer 2014, N'Daw joined Ligue 1 side Metz on a two-year deal.

In October 2016, following the arrival of coach Alain Casanova and having made no appearances during the early 2016-17 season, N'Daw left Ligue 2 side Lens by mutual consent.

== International career ==
N'Daw first played for the Senegal national team in 2004. He earned 41 caps for his country scoring 4 goals. He represented Senegal at the 2006 Africa Cup of Nations, where his team took fourth place for the third time in history. He was named in the 23-man squad for the 2012 Africa Cup of Nations, and played in two of their three group match defeats as Senegal failed to qualify for the later stages of the tournament.

== Age fabrication ==
In February 2020, in an interview with a Senegalese radio station, N'Daw admitted to age fabrication, stating that he had lowered his age to turn professional and such an act was common practice among Senegalese footballers.

== Personal life ==
N'Daw holds French nationality. On 31 January 2019, N'Daw joined French amateur club AS Algrange.

== Career statistics ==
Scores and results list Senegal's goal tally first, score column indicates score after each N’Daw goal.

List of international goals scored by Guirane N'Daw
No.	Date	Venue	Opponent	Score	Result	Competition
1	2 September 2006	Stade Léopold Sédar Senghor, Dakar, Senegal	Mozambique	2–0	2–0	2008 Africa Cup of Nations qualification
2	8 September 2007	Stade Léopold Sédar Senghor, Dakar, Senegal	Burkina Faso	1–0	5–1	2008 Africa Cup of Nations qualification
3	3 March 2010	Karaiskakis Stadium, Athens, Greece	Greece	2–0	2–0	Friendly
4	11 November 2011	Stade Aimé Bergéal, Paris, France	Guinea	1–0	4–1	Friendly

== Honours ==
Sochaux

- Coupe de France: 2007
