= 2020–21 Coupe de France preliminary rounds, Grand Est =

The 2020–21 Coupe de France preliminary rounds, Grand Est was the qualifying competition to decide which teams from the leagues of the Grand Est region of France took part in the main competition from the seventh round.

A total of 16 teams qualified from the Grand Est preliminary rounds. In 2019–20, SAS Épinal progressed the furthest in the main competition, reaching the quarter-final, defeating Lille on the way, before eventually losing to Saint-Étienne.

== Schedule ==
A total of 960 teams entered from the region. All teams from the Régional and District leagues, with the exception of the six Régional 1 teams that performed the best in last years competition, entered at the first round stage. Therefore, there were 467 ties in the first round on 30 August 2020. Five of the Régional 1 clubs exempted from the first round entered at the second round stage. The remaining exempted Régional 1 club was given a bye to the third round stage.

The third round draw, which saw the entry of the teams from Championnat National 3, took place on 15 September 2020. The fourth round draw, which saw the entry of the teams from Championnat National 2, took place in three parts over the 23 and 24 September 2020. The fifth round draw was made on 7 October 2020. The sixth round draw took place on 21 October 2020.

=== First round ===
The first round is split into the separate competitions for the three sub-regions of Lorraine, Champagne-Ardenne and Alsace.

==== First round: Lorraine ====
These matches were played on 29 and 30 August 2020, with one postponed until 9 September 2020.

First round results: Grand Est - Lorraine
Tie no	Home team (tier)	Score	Away team (tier)
1.	FC Abreschviller (10)	4–2	FC Hommert (10)
2.	US Alsting-Zinzing (10)	0–2	US Behren-lès-Forbach (8)
3.	AS Montigny-lès-Metz (7)	10–0 (Note: Tie reversed from original draw.)	JS Ancy-sur-Moselle (11)
4	FC Angevillers (11)	0–5	US Yutz (9)
5.	US Arches-Archettes-Raon (10)	0–5	FC Éloyes (8)
6.	US Arriance (11)	0–5	EF Delme-Solgne (8)
7.	JS Ars-Laquenexy (9)	1–1 (2–4 p)	ES Courcelles-sur-Nied (8)
8.	Ars-sur-Moselle FC (11)	1–1 (2–4 p)	GS Thiaucourt (10)
9.	CS&O Blénod-Pont-à-Mousson (7)	7–0	FC Atton (11)
10.	CSJ Augny (11)	1–6	RS Magny (7)
11.	US Aumetz (11)	1–2	ES Crusnes (8)
12.	ES Avricourt Moussey (10)	2–5	FC Dieuze (9)
13.	AS Ay-sur-Moselle (11)	0–4	FC Trémery (6)
14.	ES Vermois (11)	2–5	FC Richardménil-Flavigny-Méréville-Messein (10)
15.	US Batilly (9)	0–2	RS Amanvillers (7)
16.	AS Baudonvilliers (10)	0–7	Bar-le-Duc FC (6)
17.	ES Béchy (11)	1–2	JA Rémilly (10)
18.	US Behonne-Longeville-en-Barois (9)	6–1	ES Maizey-Lacroix (9)
19.	FC Belleray (10)	2–4	US Etain-Buzy (7)
20.	TS Bertrange (10)	1–1 (6–7 p)	US Illange (9)
21.	US Beuveille (11)	1–2	ES Gorcy-Cosnes (10)
22.	JS Bischwald (10)	0–0 (9–8 p)	CS Diebling (9)
23.	AS MJC Blâmont (11)	2–0	AS Laneuveville Marainviller (9)
24.	JS Bousse (10)	0–5	FC Hagondange (8)
25.	CO Bouzonville (10)	1–2	MJC Volmerange-lès-Boulay (8)
26.	USF Brouderdorff (10)	4–1	Montagnarde Walscheid (9)
27.	SM Bruyères (10)	0–4	ES Avière Darnieulles (8)
28.	RF Bulgnéville (11)	1–2	US Lamarche (10)
29.	Entente Bure-Boulange (9)	0–3	AS Algrange (8)
30.	FC Carling (10)	0–8	SR Creutzwald 03 (8)
31.	US Cattenom (10)	0–1	US Oudrenne (9)
32.	Amicale Chanteheux (10	2–5	ES Lunéville Sixte (9)
33.	ES Charmois Damelevières (10)	1–4	AC Blainville-Damelevières (7)
34.	US Châtel-Saint-Germain (9)	4–5	ESAP Metz (7)
35.	AS Chavigny (11)	3–3 (5–4 p)	AS Dommartin-lès-Toul (11)
36.	AS Cheniménil (10)	1–3	AS Gérardmer (8)
37.	AS Colombey (10)	1–0	AS Gironcourt (9)
38.	SC Commercy (10)	1–4	Entente Centre Ornain (8)
39.	RC Corcieux (12)	4–1	FC Granges-sur-Vologne (10)
40.	AS Corny (10)	0–0 (4–3 p)	FC Novéant (8)
41.	US Courcelles-Chaussy (9)	1–3	ES Faulquemont-Créhange (8)
42.	ASL Coussey-Greux (10)	1–1 (9–8 p)	Lorraine Vaucouleurs (8)
43.	Excelsior Cuvry (9)	2–0	FC Pont-à-Mousson (7)
44.	FC Dannelbourg (10)	0–6	AS Bettborn Hellering (8)
45.	AS Darney (10)	1–1 (4–3 p)	AS Girancourt-Dommartin-Chaumousey (8)
46.	FC Dieulouard (9)	0–1	AS Lay-Saint-Christophe/Bouxieres-aux-Dames (8)
47.	JS Distroff (11)	0–5	ES Kœnigsmacker-Kédange (8)
48.	FC Dommartin-lès-Remiremont (11)	3–0	AS Plombières (10)
49.	ASC Dompaire (10)	4–2	Dogneville FC (10)
50.	FC Écrouves (9)	0–1	Entente Sorcy Void-Vacon (7)
51.	AS Einvaux (12)	0–5	ES Bayon-Roville (10)
52.	JSO Ennery (11)	0–2	AS Talange (9)
53.	Entente Sud 54 (11)	0–11	Toul JCA (8)
54.	AS Entrange (12)	1–1 (1–3 p)	AS Konacker (10)
55.	FC Vierge (11)	3–2	FC Ajolais (11)
56.	ES Haute Meurthe (9)	0–2	FC Sainte-Marguerite (8)
57.	AS Essegney-Langley (12)	1–6	AS Nomexy-Vincey (9)
58.	SM Etival (10)	0–0 (7–6 p)	SC Baccarat (10)
59.	US Etzling (12)	1–4	US Spicheren (9)
60.	AS Falck (12)	2–4	AS Anzeling Edling (11)
61.	FC Farschviller (11)	1–6	US Holving (9)
62.	FR Faulx (11)	0–1	ES Custines-Malleloy (8)
63.	Flétrange SA (10)	0–6	US Valmont (8)
64.	Fleury FC (10)	0–5	FC Verny-Louvigny-Cuvry (9)
65.	AS Florange-Ebange (11)	1–6	ES Fameck (7)
66.	FC Folschviller (9)	1–2	FC Longeville-lès-Saint-Avold (8)
67.	FC Creutzberg Forbach (10)	3–3 (5–4 p)	SO Merlebach (8)
68.	FC Francaltroff (11)	1–0	US Bénestroff (10)
69.	US Frauenberg (11)	0–5	ES Rimling-Erching-Obergailbach (11)
70.	FC Freyming (8)	1–2	AS Morhange (7)
71.	US Froidcul (9)	0–0 (11–12 p)	AS Clouange (8)
72.	Omnisports Frouard Pompey (10)	0–0 (6–5 p)	AS Grand Couronné (9)
73.	ES Garche (10)	0–5	FC Hettange-Grande (7)
74.	AS Gondreville (8)	0–1	ES Heillecourt (7)
75.	Entente Gravelotte-Verneville (11)	1–4	SC Marly (8)
76.	ES Gros Réderching-Bettviller (10)	1–5	ES Pays du Bitche 2020 (9)
77.	FC Guénange (9)	0–3	CS Veymerange (7)
78.	US Guentrange (9)	4–1	US Volkrange (10)
79.	FC Hadol-Dounoux (9)	0–0 (8–7 p)	AS Saint-Nabord (9)
80.	FC Hambach (10)	2–1	AS Kalhausen (10)
81.	AS Hauconcourt (10)	0–2	ES Marange-Silvange (8)
82.	Olympique Haussonville (10)	0–2	FC Saint-Max-Essey (7)
83.	FC Héming (11)	0–2	SR Langatte (11)
84.	US Hilsprich (11)	0–5	FC Beausoleil Sarreguemines (10)
85.	SO Ippling (10)	4–3	US Roth (9)
86.	AS Kerbach (10)	0–3	US Forbach (6)
87.	JL Knutange (11)	0–3 (Note: Tie won by means of forfeit.)	AS Portugais Saint-Francois Thionville (7)
88.	APM Metz (6)	3–0	RS La Maxe (10)
89.	FC Fains-Véel (9)	2–2 (3–1 p)	ES Lérouvillois Cheminote (10)
90.	SC Les Islettes (10)	1–2	USI Blaise (6)
91.	US Lexy (10)	0–4	USB Longwy (8)
92.	FC L'Hôpital (11)	3–0	Huchet AC (10)
93.	AS Lixing-lès-Rouhling (11)	1–5	US Hundling (11)
94.	FC Loisy (12)	0–6	ENJ Val-de-Seille (9)
95.	FC Lorry-Plappeville (11)	0–4	FC Woippy (10)
96.	FC Lunéville Turc (11)	4–0	AS Rehainviller Hériménil (9)
97.	ES Macheren Petit-Ebersviller (9)	0–5	SSEP Hombourg-Haut (7)
98.	FJEP Magnières (10)	5–1	Entente Bru-Jeanménil SBH (9)
99.	ES Maizières (11)	1–7	Val de l'Orne FC (7)
100.	SC Malzéville (9)	0–3	RC Champigneulles (6)
101.	JS Manom (11)	1–5	US Briey (8)
102.	AS Mars-la-Tour (11)	1–1 (2–4 p)	US Conflans (9)
103.	US Marspich (10)	3–0	Florange FC (11)
104.	Maxéville FC (9)	0–1	COS Villers (7)
105.	AS Mercy-le-Bas (10)	3–6	Association Saint-Laurent-Mangiennes (10)
106.	US ACLI Metz (10)	0–0 (5–4 p)	UL Plantières Metz (8)
107.	CO Metz Bellecroix (12)	4–6	JS Metz (12)
108.	AF Os Conquistadors Metz (10)	2–0	US Ban-Saint-Martin (8)
109.	AS Metz Grange aux Bois (11)	2–2 (9–8 p)	US Vigy (10)
110.	AG Metzervisse (9)	2–0	FC Yutz (9)
111.	FC Metzing (9)	2–5	USF Farébersviller (8)
112.	ES Villerupt-Thil (6)	3–0	FC Mexy (10)
113.	US Mirecourt-Hymont (10)	5–0	FC Charmois-l'Orgueilleux (11)
114.	Olympique Mittelbronn 04 (11)	1–3	EFT Sarrebourg (9)
115.	FC Mondelange (10)	1–7	ES Gandrange (7)
116.	USL Mont Saint-Martin (9)	1–4	AS Saulnes Longlaville (8)
117.	FC Montois (10)	0–7	FC Lunéville (6)
118.	US Pagny-sur-Moselle (6)	4–0	AJSE Montauville (10)
119.	AS Montbronn (9)	2–2 (3–2 p)	US Goetzenbruck-Meisenthal (8)
120.	ASC Montiers-sur-Saulx (11)	1–1 (1–4 p)	AS Tréveray (9)
121.	US Morsbach (11)	0–6	FC Hochwald (8)
122.	SC Moulins-lès-Metz (10)	1–2	ES Metz (8)
123.	ASPTT Nancy (11)	4–1	ES Laneuveville (9)
124.	AS Haut-du-Lièvre Nancy (8)	0–4	AF Laxou Sapinière (7)
125.	AJS René II (10)	0–3	AS Ludres (8)
126.	GS Nébing (11)	0–5	CS Stiring-Wendel (9)
127.	FC Neufchâteau-Liffol (10)	0–3	GS Haroué-Benney (7)
128.	Entente Neufgrange-Siltzheim (11)	3–3 (5–4 p)	ES Wies-Woelf 93 (10)
129.	RC Nilvange (11)	0–3	US Fontoy (9)
130.	AS Nixéville-Blercourt (11)	0–7	US Thierville (8)
131.	ES Ormersviller-Epping (11)	0–3	AS Mouterhouse (10)
132.	RS Ottange-Nondkeil (10)	1–1 (3–4 p)	CS Volmerange-les-Mines (10)
133.	AS Padoux (9)	0–0 (8–7 p)	ES Golbey (6)
134.	FC Pagny-sur-Meuse (10)	3–5	Bulgnéville Contrex Vittel FC (8)
135.	CS Philippsbourg (11)	3–2	SR Baerenthal (11)
136.	RC Pierrepont (11)	0–13	FC Bassin Piennois (6)
137.	FC Pierrevillers (10)	1–1 (8–7 p)	AS Les Côteaux (8)
138.	LSC Portieux (10)	1–1 (5–3 p)	CS Charmes (9)
139.	FC Rahling (10)	2–4	AS Bliesbruck (8)
140.	AS Ramonchamp (11)	3–4	SR Pouxeux Jarménil (10)
141.	AS Rech (11)	0–0 (3–4 p)	FC Istanbul Sarreguemines (10)
142.	AS Réchicourt-le-Château (11)	0–2	SS Hilbesheim (10)
143.	Entente Réhon Villers Morfontaine (9)	0–1	ES Longuyon (8)
144.	ESR Rémeling (10)	3–0	ASC Basse-Ham (9)
145.	FC Retonfey Noisseville Montoy-Flanville (11)	1–7	AS Saint-Julien-lès-Metz (7)
146.	JS Rettel-Hunting (10)	1–1 (2–4 p) (Note: Challenge lodged. AS Sœtrich penalised. JS Rettel-Hunting qualify.)	AS Sœtrich (10)
147.	ES Richemont (9)	– (Note: Match not played. ES Richemont penalised. USAG Uckange qualify.)	USAG Uckange (7)
148.	US Rosières-aux-Salines (10)	2–5	Jarville JF (6)
149.	US Rouhling (10)	1–2	AS Neunkirch (8)
150.	AS Stade Ruppéen (12)	0–5	AS Vagney (8)
151.	US Russange (11)	0–1	Thionville FC (7)
152.	FC Saint-Amé-Julienrupt (11)	0–8	FC Haute Moselotte (9)
153.	ASJA Saint-Avold (11)	0–3	ES Lixing-Laning 95 (10)
154.	JS Wenheck (8)	1–2	US Nousseviller (6)
155.	US Saint-Jean-Rohrbach (11)	1–2	AS Hellimer (9)
156.	Saint-Louis 2017 (11)	1–3	FC Lemberg-Saint-Louis (10)
157.	FC Des Ballons (9)	0–0 (3–5 p)	FC Remiremont Saint-Étienne (8)
158.	ES Michelloise (12)	2–2 (1–3 p)	ES Badonviller-Celles (11)
159.	AS Saint-Nicolas-en-Forêt (11)	2–4	JS Audunoise (9)
160.	SC Saizerais (11)	3–0	Francs Tireurs Moselle Liverdun (10)
161.	FC Sarralbe (9)	1–1 (3–4 p)	US Soucht (8)
162.	SR Sarraltroff (11)	1–0	AS Brouviller (10)
163.	FC Saint-Quirin (12)	2–4	Sportive Lorquinoise (11)
164.	RC Saulx et Barrois (9)	2–3	FC Revigny (9)
165.	US Schneckenbusch (10)	2–0	AS Réding (8)
166.	Entente Schorbach Hottviller Volmunster 13 (11)	0–5	Achen-Etting-Schmittviller (7)
167.	FC Seichamps (9)	1–3	FC Pulnoy (7)
168.	US Senones (12)	0–10	SR Saint-Dié (8)
169.	RS Serémange-Erzange (10)	0–6	ES Rosselange Vitry (8)
170.	ASCC Seuil-d'Argonne (10)	0–4	SF Verdun Belleville (8)
171.	RC Sommedieue (10)	2–1	FC Dugny (9)
172.	FC Sommerviller (11)	1–6	FC Dombasle-sur-Meurthe (8)
173.	FC Verrerie-Sophie (11)	0–4	ES Petite-Rosselle (8)
174.	SM Taintrux (11)	2–8	Saulcy FC (9)
175.	AS Teting-sur-Nied (10)	0–2	Étoile Naborienne Saint-Avold (6)
176.	JS Thil (11)	0–1	CS Godbrange (8)
177.	Entente Vigneulles-Hannonville-Fresne (8)	3–1	ES Tilly-Ambly Villers-Bouquemont (10)
178.	GSA Tomblaine (11)	2–4	MJC Pichon (9)
179.	FC Toul (9)	1–1 (3–0 p)	AS Villey-Saint Étienne (8)
180.	AS Tucquegnieux-Trieux (10)	0–3	FC Hayange (8)
181.	ES Cons-Ugny Val de Chiers (10)	3–4	CSP Réhon (9)
182.	US Val de Saône (11)	0–3	FC Amerey Xertigny (9)
183.	AS Val d'Ornain (10)	0–8	FC Saint-Mihiel (8)
184.	FC Val Dunois (11)	3–0	FC Othe-Montmédy (10)
185.	Olympique Valleroy Moineville Hatrize (10)	0–7	US Jarny (8)
186.	AFP Vandœuvre (12)	0–2	FC Houdemont (9)
187.	AS Varangéville-Saint-Nicolas (9)	1–3	ASC Saulxures-lès-Nancy (9)
188.	AS Velaine-en-Haye (11)	0–2	Stade Flévillois (9)
189.	GS Vézelise (11)	1–6	GS Neuves-Maisons (7)
190.	AS Vibersviller (11)	0–6	AS Le Val-de-Guéblange (10)
191.	SC Vic-sur-Seille (9)	1–4	FC Château-Salins (9)
192.	FC Vignot (10)	0–1	AS Dieue-Sommedieue (9)
193.	ES Villing (11)	1–3	FC Coume (9)
194.	FC Vœlfling (11)	7–0	AS Guerting (10)
195.	FC Waldhouse-Walschbronn (10)	0–0 (4–3 p)	FC Bitche (10)
196.	AS Welferding (11)	0–16	Sarreguemines FC (6)
197.	ES Woippy (9)	1–0	UL Rombas (8)
198.	JSA Yutz Cité (11)	1–2	FC Devant-les-Ponts Metz (8)

==== First round: Champagne-Ardenne ====
These matches were played on 30 August 2020.

First round results: Grand Est - Champagne-Ardenne
Tie no	Home team (tier)	Score	Away team (tier)
1.	FC Allobais Doncherois (9)	1–1 (3–4 p)	CA Villers-Semeuse (7)
2.	US Arc-en-Barrois (10)	0–2	ASPTT Chaumont (9)
3.	Argonne FC (9)	2–8	Châlons FCO (7)
4.	AS Chartreux (9)	2–2 (6–5 p)	Rosières Omnisports (7)
5.	Alliance Sud-Ouest Football Aubois (8)	0–0 (4–5 p)	ESC Melda (8)
6.	ES Auvillers/Signy-le-Petit (11)	1–1 (0–3 p)	FC Haybes (9)
7.	CS Agéen (8)	2–2 (2–4 p)	Vitry FC (8)
8.	US Balan (9)	0–4	FC Bogny (6)
9.	Bar-sur-Aube FC (8)	0–9	FC Saint-Meziery (6)
10.	FC Vallée de la Suippe (10)	0–3	AS Asfeld (7)
11.	Bétheny FC (8)	1–0	SA Sézanne (9)
12.	US Biesles (9)	1–3	Stade Chevillonnais (7)
13.	FC Bièvres-Chauvency (11)	0–3	ES Saulces-Monclin (9)
14.	FC Bologne (9)	0–1	AF Valcourt (10)
15.	US Bourbonnaise (10)	0–3	FC Saints-Geosmois (7)
16.	ES Breuvannes (11)	0–2	AS Poissons-Noncourt (9)
17.	SOS Buzancy (11)	1–6	AS Val de l'Aisne (8)
18.	FC Porcien (8)	1–1 (4–5 p)	Liart-Signy-l'Abbaye FC (8)
19.	FC Châteauvillain (9)	2–2 (2–4 p)	CS Chalindrey (8)
20.	US Châtelraould-Les Rivières-Henruel (10)	3–0	FC Caillot (10)
21.	FCCS Bragard (10)	0–0 (2–4 p)	US Montier-en-Der (8)
22.	Cheveuges-Saint-Aignan CO (10)	2–2 (4–3 p)	AS Charleville Franco-Turque (10)
23.	Colombey FC (11)	1–2	FC Joinville-Vecqueville (8)
24.	ES Connantre-Corroy (11)	1–3	FC Épernay (7)
25.	US Couvrot (10)	1–4	FC Côte des Blancs (7)
26.	FC Dampierre (10)	1–13	Chaumont FC (6)
27.	QV Douzy (8)	0–1	Rethel SF (6)
28.	AS Le Pailly (10)	4–5	US Rouvres (11)
29.	ES Charleville-Mézières (8)	2–1	AS Tournes/Renwez/Les Mazures/Arreux/Montcornet (7)
30.	SC Portugais Épernay (11)	0–3 (Note: Tie won by means of forfeit.)	AS Courtisols ESTAN (8)
31.	AS Esnouveaux (11)	0–6	Espérance Saint-Dizier (8)
32.	Espérance Rémoise (9)	1–2	FC Christo (7)
33.	US Esternay (10)	2–2 (3–4 p)	AS Cheminots Châlons (10)
34.	Entente Étoges-Vert (11)	3–0	US Dizy (10)
35.	Étoile Chapelaine (8)	7–0	ES Celles-Essoyes (10)
36.	DS Eurville-Bienville (10)	4–1	CS Doulaincourt-Saucourt (10)
37.	FC Faux-Vésigneul-Pogny (9)	0–1	RC Sézanne (7)
38.	Floing FC (9)	0–4	US Bazeilles (8)
39.	FC Haute Borne (11)	2–2 (1–3 p)	FC Villiers-en-Lieu (10)
40.	ES Joigny (11)	1–0	ES Novion-Porcien (11)
41.	SL Ornel (8)	2–1	ES Andelot-Rimaucourt-Bourdons (8)
42.	CO Langres (10)	1–4	ES Prauthoy-Vaux (8)
43.	ES Gault-Soigny (9)	3–2	SC Dormans (10)
44.	JS Louvemont (10)	1–3	FC Laville-aux-Bois (10)
45.	AS Lumes (10)	0–3	Olympique Torcy-Sedan (7)
46.	FC Maubert-Fontaine (11)	3–5	US Revin (8)
47.	McCain FC Matouges (12)	0–10	AS Saint-Brice-Courcelles (10)
48.	AS Monthermé-Thilay (9)	1–3	AS Bourg-Rocroi (8)
49.	SC Montmirail (11)	0–7	ASPTT Châlons (7)
50.	FC Morgendois (10)	2–0	UCS Nogentaise (11)
51.	ES Muizonnaise (11)	2–4	AS Cernay-Berru-Lavannes (7)
52.	SR Neuilly-l'Évêque (9)	0–3	SC Marnaval (6)
53.	AS Nogentaise (10)	1–2	US Éclaron (6)
54.	FC Nord Est Aubois (8)	0–1	US Dienville (8)
55.	USC Nouvion-sur-Meuse (9)	0–0 (2–3 p)	Olympique Charleville Neufmanil Aiglemont (8)
56.	Nord Champagne FC (7)	4–0 (Note: Tie reversed from original draw.)	US Oiry (8)
57.	Olympique FC Reims (11)	2–3	AS Gueux (10)
58.	FC Pargny-sur-Saulx (10)	0–4	ES Fagnières (8)
59.	AS Portugaise Nogent-sur-Seine (9)	0–9	FC Métropole Troyenne (6)
60.	FC Prez Bourmont (9)	4–0	US Fayl-Billot/Hortes (10)
61.	FC Blagny-Carignan (7)	8–2	FC Puilly Entente Pays d'Yvois (12)
62.	Renouveau Ramerupt (8)	4–2	Foyer Barsequanais (7)
63.	ASR Raucourt (11)	1–1 (2–4 p)	AS Mouzon (10)
64.	AS Cheminon (10)	2–1	Reims Murigny Franco Portugais (9)
65.	CA Rolampontais (9)	1–3	AS Sarrey-Montigny (7)
66.	AS Sault-lès-Rethel (11)	0–7	USA Le Chesne (7)
67.	SC Savières (10)	1–1 (5–4 p)	Étoile Lusigny (9)
68.	USS Sermaize (10)	2–2 (4–3 p)	ES Witry-les-Reims (8)
69.	Entente Somsois Margerie Saint-Utin (9)	0–2	US Avize-Grauves (6)
70.	Saint-Gilles FC (10)	1–3	CS Maranville-Rennepont (8)
71.	JS Saint-Julien FC (8)	0–3	FC Nogentais (6)
72.	AS Saint-Laurent (11)	0–8	Le Theux FC (7)
73.	FC Saint-Martin-sur-le-Pré/La Veuve/Recy (10)	0–3	FCF La Neuvillette-Jamin (8)
74.	Saint-Memmie FC (10)	1–4	Foyer Compertrix (9)
75.	AS Taissy (8)	4–0	FC Tinqueux Champagne (9)
76.	AS Tertre (9)	2–2 (8–9 p)	US Vendeuvre (8)
77.	FC Conflans-sur-Seine (10)	7–0	Torvilliers AC (9)
78.	FC Trainel (9)	0–3	RCS La Chapelle (6)
79.	FC Vallant/Les Grès (9)	4–1	ES Municipaux Troyes (8)
80.	JS Vaudoise (7)	2–0	FC Malgache (7)
81.	US Fismes Ardre et Vesle (8)	3–0	SC Viennois (12)
82.	AS Ville-sur-Lumes (10)	3–3 (4–5 p)	US Fumay-Charnois (8)
83.	Joyeuse de Warcq (11)	0–2	Nord Ardennes (8)

==== First round: Alsace ====
These matches were played on 29 and 30 August 2020, with four postponed until 6, 8 and 9 September 2020.

First round results: Grand Est - Alsace
Tie no	Home team (tier)	Score	Away team (tier)
1.	FC Alteckendorf (11)	0–3	US Ittenheim (7)
2.	FC Wissembourg/Altenstadt (12)	4–3	ES Offendorf (13)
3.	FC Artolsheim (11)	3–0	US Dambach-la-Ville (12)
4.	US Artzenheim (13)	1–0	AS Ober-Niederentzen (11)
5.	FC Baldersheim (9)	0–3	FC Pfastatt 1926 (8)
6.	AS Portugais Barembach-Bruche (12)	1–7	FC Still 1930 (6)
7.	FC Barr (12)	0–2	SR Zellwiller (11)
8.	FC Battenheim (12)	1–4	Mouloudia Mulhouse (8)
9.	FC Batzendorf (13)	3–2	AS Wahlenheim-Bernolsheim (12)
10.	SS Beinheim (11)	3–1	AS Gambsheim (9)
11.	SR Bergheim (10)	0–0 (4–3 p)	FC Horbourg-Wihr (9)
12.	CS Bernardswiller (11)	0–2	FC Krautergersheim (10)
13.	ASLC Berstett (13)	1–4	FC Souffelweyersheim (9)
14.	FC Bischwiller (12)	3–3 (2–3 p)	FC Eschbach (10)
15.	US Turcs Bischwiller (8)	3–1	FC Schweighouse-sur-Moder (7)
16.	ASC Blaesheim (13)	3–4	FC Avolsheim (13)
17.	FC Wintzfelden-Osenbach (8)	13–0 (Note: Tie reversed from original draw.)	AS Blodelsheim (12)
18.	FC Boersch (11)	1–6	FCSR Obernai (7)
19.	US Bouxwiller (12)	0–3 (Note: Tie won by means of forfeit.)	SC Drulingen (7)
20.	FC Breuschwickersheim (11)	1–2	ASB Schirmeck-La Broque (9)
21.	FC Buhl (10)	3–3 (5–3 p)	FC Sainte-Croix-en-Plaine (8)
22.	AS Burnhaupt-le-Bas (9)	0–16	Cernay FC (8)
23.	AS Canton Vert (10)	0–1	FC Ostheim-Houssen (8)
24.	Saint-Georges Carspach (13)	2–4	AS Mertzen (9)
25.	AS Châtenois (11)	2–5	AS Saint-Pierre-Bois/Triembach-au-Val (10)
26.	FC Colmar Unifié (11)	1–4	SR Kaysersberg (8)
27.	US Dachstein (10)	2–3	AS Natzwiller (11)
28.	US Dalhunden (12)	3–7	FR Sessenheim-Stattmatten (9)
29.	FC Dauendorf (13)	0–3	AC Hinterfeld (11)
30.	AS Diebolsheim Friesenheim (13)	0–3	AS Erstein (6)
31.	SC Dinsheim (12)	1–4	FC Lingolsheim (10)
32.	SR Dorlisheim (13)	1–1 (2–4 p)	EB Achenheim (8)
33.	FC Dossenheim-sur-Zinsel (10)	0–2	ASI Avenir (8)
34.	USL Duppigheim (9)	0–10	ES Molsheim-Ernolsheim (7)
35.	AS Durlinsdorf (11)	7–3	Entente Hagenbach-Balschwiller (9)
36.	SC Ebersheim (10)	3–2	US Sundhouse (11)
37.	FC Ebersmunster (15)	1–4	RC Kintzheim (9)
38.	FC Ensisheim (11)	2–1	FC Réguisheim (9)
39.	FC Entzheim (11)	4–1	AS Niedernai (10)
40.	FC Ernolsheim-lès-Saverne (12)	6–2	ASL Duntzenheim (10)
41.	FC Eschau (9)	3–0	FC Ecrivains-Schiltigheim-Bischheim (10)
42.	US Ettendorf (10)	5–0	SC Dettwiller (11)
43.	FC Feldkirch (10)	2–2 (3–5 p)	FC Anatolie Mulhouse (10)
44.	FC Fessenheim (8)	4–0	FC Hirtzfelden (8)
45.	SR Furdenheim (13)	0–14	AS Elsau Portugais Strasbourg (7)
46.	AS Gerstheim (11)	0–3	US Nordhouse (8)
47.	FC Geudertheim (9)	3–0	SS Brumath (10)
48.	US Goxwiller (13)	1–10	US Oberschaeffolsheim (8)
49.	FC Grendelbruch (12)	0–6	AS Mutzig (8)
50.	FC Gries (12)	0–6	AS Wœrth (12)
51.	AS Guewenheim (10)	0–3	FC Illhaeusern (8)
52.	US Gumbrechtshoffen (11)	0–8	AS Hoerdt (8)
53.	FC Gundolsheim (11)	1–1 (6–5 p)	AS Munster (8)
54.	FC Hagenthal-Wentzwiller (9)	1–0	AS Blotzheim (7)
55.	US Hangenbieten (11)	2–3	AS Wisches-Russ-Lutzelhouse (10)
56.	AS Hatten (12)	0–5	US Schleithal (9)
57.	AS Hausgauen (12)	0–1	AS Altkirch (8)
58.	AS Heiligenstein (12)	2–1	AS Portugais Sélestat (10)
59.	AS Heimsbrunn (9)	4–0	AS Rixheim (10)
60.	FC Heiteren (10)	3–4	FC Burnhaupt-le-Haut (7)
61.	ASCCO Helfrantzkirch (11)	1–1 (3–5 p)	RC Mulhouse (10)
62.	FC Herbsheim (11)	3–3 (5–4 p)	AS Sermersheim (10)
63.	AS Herrlisheim (13)	1–2	AS Pfaffenheim (9)
64.	FC Herrlisheim (8)	1–5	SS Weyersheim (6)
65.	FC Hipsheim (13)	0–4	AS Strasbourg (8)
66.	AS Hochstatt (12)	1–1 (4–3 p)	RC Dannemarie (9)
67.	SR Hoenheim (9)	2–7	FCO Strasbourg Koenigshoffen 06 (7)
68.	FC Hoffen (13)	10–1	FC Neuhaeusel (13)
69.	AS Hohengœft (11)	1–2	FC Dangolsheim (12)
70.	AS Holtzheim (10)	1–3	ALFC Duttlenheim (8)
71.	US Huttenheim (12)	0–3	US Baldenheim (8)
72.	FC Illfurth (10)	3–2	US Hirsingue (8)
73.	FC Ingersheim (9)	1–5	FC Bennwihr (8)
74.	US Innenheim (10)	0–6	FC Eckbolsheim (8)
75.	FC Kappelen (10)	0–0 (4–3 p)	US Hésingue (9)
76.	FC Kertzfeld (12)	0–4	FC Rossfeld (7)
77.	AS Kilstett (11)	0–3	AS Seebach (10)
78.	FC Kingersheim (9)	3–5	FC Riedisheim (8)
79.	ASL Kœtzingue (7)	4–0	Real ASPTT Mulhouse CF (8)
80.	AS Kurtzenhouse (11)	1–1 (3–4 p)	Entente Kaltenhouse/Marienthal (9)
81.	La Wantzenau FC (11)	0–3	SC Red Star Strasbourg (10)
82.	FC Lampertheim (9)	2–0	US Eckwershiem (10)
83.	AS Lauterbourg (13)	1–12	AS Hunspach (8)
84.	AGIIR Florival (7)	8–1	FC Lauw (10)
85.	AS Saint-Barthelemy Leutenheim (13)	0–9	FC Niederlauterbach (10)
86.	OC Lipsheim (10)	1–4	CS Neuhof Strasbourg (9)
87.	AS Luemschwiller (13)	1–11	FC Traubach (10)
88.	AS Lupstein (9)	0–4	AS Ingwiller/Menchhoffen (8)
89.	AS Lutterbach (9)	4–1	FC Sausheim (9)
90.	FC Mackwiller (11)	2–0	CSIE Harskirchen (12)
91.	SC Maisonsgoutte (13)	0–0 (5–4 p)	FC Hilsenheim (12)
92.	AS Marckolsheim (10)	2–0	FC Kogenheim (11)
93.	FC Marlenheim-Kirchheim (11)	0–3	AS Mundolsheim (8)
94.	FC Marmoutier (13)	0–16	US Reipertswiller (7)
95.	US Meistratzheim (13)	0–3	FC Geispolsheim 01 (6)
96.	FC Merxheim (9)	2–2 (3–4 p)	FC Meyenheim (8)
97.	US Mommenheim (11)	1–3	US Imbsheim (11)
98.	FC Monswiller (12)	0–5	FC Sarrebourg (6)
99.	Entente Mothern Munchhausen (9)	0–2	US Oberlauterbach (7)
100.	Alliance Muespach-Folgensbourg (10)	2–0	FC Hirtzbach (8)
101.	Amicale Antillais Mulhouse (12)	3–3 (2–4 p)	FC Blue Star Reiningue (10)
102.	US Azzurri Mulhouse (10)	1–2	AS Raedersheim (8)
103.	CS Mulhouse Bourtzwiller (9)	0–2	FC Morschwiller-le-Bas (8)
104.	Étoile Mulhouse (11)	2–5	FCRS Richwiller (8)
105.	FC Munchhouse (10)	1–3	FC Niederhergheim (9)
106.	AS Mussig (9)	1–4	FC Rhinau (8)
107.	AS Muttersholtz (13)	0–11	US Scherwiller (9)
108.	US Niederbronn-les-Bains (13)	1–5	FC Durrenbach (9)
109.	FC Niederhausbergen (12)	1–3	FC Oberhausbergen (9)
110.	FC Niedermodern (13)	2–3	Fatih-Sport Haguenau (11)
111.	FC Niederrœdern/Olympique Schaffhouse (13)	4–2	FC Lampertsloch-Merkswiller (12)
112.	FC Niederschaeffolsheim (11)	3–2	FC Kindwiller (11)
113.	AS Niffer (10)	0–6	US Wittenheim (7)
114.	US Oberbruck Dolleren (10)	0–2	US Vallée de la Thur (8)
115.	FC Oberhergheim (12)	3–0	AS Hattstatt (13)
116.	FC Oberroedern/Aschbach (10)	0–8	FCE Schirrhein (6)
117.	FC Obermorschwiller (10)	5–2	FC Village Neuf (10)
118.	FC Oltingue (11)	1–5	AS Huningue (7)
119.	FC Ostwald (10)	0–0 (5–3 p)	AS Menora Strasbourg (7)
120.	SC Ottmarsheim (7)	1–1 (4–5 p)	AS Berrwiller-Hartsmannswiller (7)
121.	AS Pfulgriesheim (10)	0–4	FC Kronenbourg Strasbourg (6)
122.	CA Plobsheim (12)	1–0	AS Espagnols Schiltigheim (12)
123.	US Pulversheim FC (9)	3–2	FC Habsheim (8)
124.	FC Quatzenheim (12)	2–4	AP Joie et Santé Strasbourg (9)
125.	Racing HW 96 (7)	1–1 (5–6 p)	SC Sélestat (8)
126.	FCE Reichshoffen (13)	0–4	FC Weitbruch (10)
127.	AS Reichstett (10)	1–5	AS Musau Strasbourg (9)
128.	FC Riedseltz (10)	1–3	FC Drusenheim (7)
129.	AS Riespach (10)	2–3	AS Aspach-le-Haut (10)
130.	AS Andolsheim (11)	5–0	FCI Riquewihr (12)
131.	SC Rittershoffen (11)	1–3	US Preuschdorf-Langensoultzbach (8)
132.	FC Roderen (11)	4–1	FC Portugais Colmar (11)
133.	SC Rœschwoog (10)	0–4	FC Steinseltz (7)
134.	Entente de la Mossig Wasselonne/Romanswiller (11)	0–9	FC Dahlenheim (8)
135.	SC Roppenheim (12)	6–2	CO Climbach (13)
136.	FC Rosenau (10)	0–1	Montreux Sports (9)
137.	FC Rosheim (12)	1–3	AS Bischoffsheim (8)
138.	FC Rott (15)	1–4	Entente Drachenbronn-Birlenbach (12)
139.	AS Saint-Hippolyte (13)	1–3	Thann FC 2017 (11)
140.	AS Saint-Louis Bourgfelden (11)	1–7	FC Hégenheim (6)
141.	AS Saint-Etienne Salmbach (15)	0–2	AS Forstfeld (12)
142.	AS Sarrewerden (12)	0–3	FC Saverne (8)
143.	FC Schaffhouse-sur-Zorn (12)	2–5	FC Truchtersheim (9)
144.	AS Schœnau (11)	0–3	FC Matzenheim (10)
145.	FR Schœnenbourg-Memmelshoffen (11)	0–2	FC Soultz-sous-Forêts/Kutzenhausen (9)
146.	FC Schwenheim (13)	0–3	AS Schillersdorf (10)
147.	FC Schwindratzheim (12)	0–3	AS Hochfelden (8)
148.	FC Saint-Etienne Seltz (7)	2–1	FC Scheibenhard (8)
149.	FC Sentheim (9)	0–1	FC Rouffach (8)
150.	FC Seppois-Bisel (9)	2–2 (7–6 p)	FC Kembs Réunis (7)
151.	AS Sigolsheim (12)	0–5	AS Guémar (8)
152.	FC Soufflenheim (11)	2–2 (2–3 p)	AS Betschdorf (8)
153.	FC Steinbourg (12)	1–6	AS Weinbourg (11)
154.	FC Steinbrunn-le-Bas (10)	2–2 (5–4 p)	AS Red Star Mulhouse (9)
155.	ES Stotzheim (11)	4–4 (4–5 p)	UJ Epfig (9)
156.	ASE Cité de l'Ill Strasbourg (10)	0–5	AS Neudorf (8)
157.	FC Egalité Strasbourg (13)	1–6	Strasbourg Université Club (11)
158.	AS 2000 Strasbourg (12)	0–7	FC Soleil Bischheim (6)
159.	ASL Robertsau (8)	6–0	SOAS Robertsau (13)
160.	FC Stockfeld Colombes (12)	0–5	US Hindisheim (9)
161.	US Surbourg (12)	1–3	SR Rountzenheim-Auenheim (9)
162.	Entente Trois Maisons-Phalsbourg (9)	1–1 (4–3 p)	AS Butten-Diemeringen (8)
163.	AS Turckheim (10)	1–4	FC Grussenheim (10)
164.	FC Uffheim (8)	0–1	FC Bartenheim (7)
165.	AS Uhrwiller (10)	1–4	AS Platania Gundershoffen (8)
166.	ES Haslach-Urmatt (13)	1–2	AS Bergbieten (13)
167.	FA Val de Moder (10)	1–4	AS Ohlungen (8)
168.	FC Valff (13)	1–7	FC Bindernheim (9)
169.	AS Valléé Noble (12)	1–9	FR Jebsheim-Muntzenheim (10)
170.	AS Blanc Vieux-Thann (8)	1–2	US Colmar (9)
171.	CS Waldhambach (11)	0–1	AS Weyer (10)
172.	FC Wettolsheim (11)	2–4	SR Saint-Amarin (9)
173.	SR Widensolen (10)	0–10	AS Ribeauvillé (7)
174.	AS Willgottheim (11)	5–1	FC Montagne Verte Strasbourg (11)
175.	US Wimmenau (11)	5–2	AS Rehthal (12)
176.	AS Wingen-sur-Moder (12)	2–2 (2–4 p)	FC Keskastel (9)
177.	FC Wingersheim (9)	1–4	FC Obermodern (6)
178.	AS Wintzenheim (12)	2–2 (4–2 p)	FC Masevaux (11)
179.	ASCA Wittelsheim (10)	0–1	FC Brunstatt (8)
180.	US Wittersheim (9)	1–1 (3–5 p)	FC Oberhoffen (10)
181.	FC Wittisheim (12)	0–3	CS Fegersheim (8)
182.	ES Wolfisheim (13)	1–8	ES Pfettisheim (9)
183.	CS Wolxheim (12)	2–1	AS Altorf (12)
184.	SS Zillisheim (8)	1–7	AS Illzach Modenheim (6)
185.	US Zimmersheim-Eschentzwiller (11)	1–1 (6–5 p)	Entente Bantzenheim-Rumersheim (9)
186.	Olympique Zinswiller (13)	0–7	AS Mertzwiller (9)

=== Second round ===
The second round is split into the separate competitions for the three sub-regions of Lorraine, Champagne-Ardenne and Alsace.

==== Second round: Lorraine ====
These matches were played on 12 and 13 September 2020, with one postponed until 16 September 2020.

Second round results: Grand Est - Lorraine
Tie no	Home team (tier)	Score	Away team (tier)
1.	AS Anzeling Edling (11)	5–1	ES Faulquemont-Créhange (8)
2.	ES Avière Darnieulles (8)	2–1	FC Hadol-Dounoux (9)
3.	ES Badonviller-Celles (11)	0–3	FC Sainte-Marguerite (8)
4.	ES Bayon-Roville (10)	2–0	LSC Portieux (10)
5.	FC Lunéville Turc (11)	0–5	AC Blainville-Damelevières (7)
6.	US Briey (8)	3–3 (7–8 p)	ES Fameck (7)
7.	ASL Coussey-Greux (10)	0–3 (Note: Tie reversed from original draw.)	Bulgnéville Contrex Vittel FC (8)
8.	Entente Centre Ornain (8)	0–3	Entente Sorcy Void-Vacon (7)
9.	FC Château-Salins (9)	1–1 (5–4 p)	JS Bischwald (10)
10.	AS Chavigny (11)	0–4	FC Toul (9)
11.	AS Clouange (8)	0–2	FC Trémery (6)
12.	US Conflans (9)	1–3	US Thierville (8)
13.	FC Coume (9)	0–1	SR Creutzwald 03 (8)
14.	ES Courcelles-sur-Nied (8)	5–2	AS Metz Grange aux Bois (11)
15.	ES Crusnes (8)	0–1	FC Bassin Piennois (6)
16.	ES Custines-Malleloy (8)	1–3	CS&O Blénod-Pont-à-Mousson (7)
17.	US ACLI Metz (10)	2–0	EF Delme-Solgne (8)
18.	AS Dieue-Sommedieue (9)	0–3	US Etain-Buzy (7)
19.	FC Dieuze (9)	1–4	AS Morhange (7)
20.	ASPTT Nancy (11)	0–5	FC Dombasle-sur-Meurthe (8)
21.	ES Pays du Bitche 2020 (9)	1–2	AS Bliesbruck (8)
22.	ES Kœnigsmacker-Kédange (8)	1–1 (3–4 p)	AS Portugais Saint-Francois Thionville (7)
23.	SM Etival (10)	0–2	FJEP Magnières (10)
24.	FC Fains-Véel (9)	1–12	Bar-le-Duc FC (6)
25.	Stade Flévillois (9)	1–2	ES Heillecourt (7)
26.	US Fontoy (9)	2–5	ESAP Metz (7)
27.	FC Pierrevillers (10)	0–2	ES Gandrange (7)
28.	ES Gorcy-Cosnes (10)	1–4	CS Godbrange (8)
29.	AS Corny (10)	2–5	Entente Vigneulles-Hannonville-Fresne (8)
30.	ASC Dompaire (10)	0–3	GS Haroué-Benney (7)
31.	FC Haute Moselotte (9)	2–1	FC Éloyes (8)
32.	FC Hayange (8)	1–6	APM Metz (6)
33.	AS Hellimer (9)	0–5	Étoile Naborienne Saint-Avold (6)
34.	US Guentrange (9)	0–3	FC Hettange-Grande (7)
35.	SS Hilbesheim (10)	2–5	AS Le Val-de-Guéblange (10)
36.	FC Hochwald (8)	5–2	US Behren-lès-Forbach (8)
37.	US Holving (9)	1–3	US Nousseviller (6)
38.	FC Creutzberg Forbach (10)	1–9	SSEP Hombourg-Haut (7)
39.	US Hundling (11)	1–5	Achen-Etting-Schmittviller (7)
40.	US Illange (9)	0–5	USAG Uckange (7)
41.	AS Konacker (10)	1–0	USB Longwy (8)
42.	US Lamarche (10)	1–0	FC Amerey Xertigny (9)
43.	SR Langatte (11)	0–2	AS Bettborn Hellering (8)
44.	AF Laxou Sapinière (7)	0–3	RC Champigneulles (6)
45.	SC Saizerais (11)	0–4	AS Lay-Saint-Christophe/Bouxieres-aux-Dames (8)
46.	FC Lemberg-Saint-Louis (10)	3–3 (3–4 p)	CS Philippsbourg (11)
47.	ES Lixing-Laning 95 (10)	0–0 (4–5 p)	FC Francaltroff (11)
48.	JS Metz (12)	0–9	FC Verny-Louvigny-Cuvry (9)
49.	FC Longeville-lès-Saint-Avold (8)	1–4	CA Boulay (6)
50.	ES Longuyon (8)	0–4	ES Villerupt-Thil (6)
51.	Sportive Lorquinoise (11)	1–3	FC Abreschviller (10)
52.	AS Ludres (8)	1–2	US Vandœuvre (6)
53.	ES Lunéville Sixte (9)	1–6	Jarville JF (6)
54.	AS MJC Blâmont (11)	0–8	FC Lunéville (6)
55.	Association Saint-Laurent-Mangiennes (10)	2–2 (p)	CSP Réhon (9)
56.	ES Marange-Silvange (8)	2–2 (1–3 p)	ES Woippy (9)
57.	SC Marly (8)	0–0 (4–1 p)	AS Montigny-lès-Metz (7)
58.	AF Os Conquistadors Metz (10)	1–1 (4–1 p)	Excelsior Cuvry (9)
59.	FC Devant-les-Ponts Metz (8)	1–2	RS Magny (7)
60.	US Mirecourt-Hymont (10)	0–3	AS Colombey (10)
61.	AS Mouterhouse (10)	1–0	Entente Neufgrange-Siltzheim (11)
62.	MJC Pichon (9)	0–0 (2–3 p)	FC Houdemont (9)
63.	SO Ippling (10)	0–3	AS Neunkirch (8)
64.	AS Nomexy-Vincey (9)	6–1	AS Darney (10)
65.	US Oudrenne (9)	2–1	CS Veymerange (7)
66.	FC Vœlfling (11)	0–1	ES Petite-Rosselle (8)
67.	SR Pouxeux Jarménil (10)	1–1 (5–4 p)	AS Gérardmer (8)
68.	ESR Rémeling (10)	1–7	AG Metzervisse (9)
69.	JA Rémilly (10)	1–4	AS Saint-Julien-lès-Metz (7)
70.	FC Remiremont Saint-Étienne (8)	0–0 (3–1 p)	FC Vierge (11)
71.	JS Rettel-Hunting (10)	1–7	AS Algrange (8)
72.	FC Revigny (9)	0–0 (4–2 p)	USI Blaise (6)
73.	FC Richardménil-Flavigny-Méréville-Messein (10)	0–6	GS Neuves-Maisons (7)
74.	ES Rimling-Erching-Obergailbach (11)	3–0	FC Waldhouse-Walschbronn (10)
75.	ES Rosselange Vitry (8)	6–2	Val de l'Orne FC (7)
76.	AS Padoux (9)	1–2	SR Saint-Dié (8)
77.	Omnisports Frouard Pompey (10)	2–2 (2–4 p)	FC Saint-Max-Essey (7)
78.	FC Saint-Mihiel (8)	0–1	US Pagny-sur-Moselle (6)
79.	SR Sarraltroff (11)	1–3	USF Brouderdorff (10)
80.	EFT Sarrebourg (9)	0–2	US Schneckenbusch (10)
81.	FC Beausoleil Sarreguemines (10)	0–6	USF Farébersviller (8)
82.	FC Istanbul Sarreguemines (10)	0–1	FC Hambach (10)
83.	Saulcy FC (9)	2–0	RC Corcieux (12)
84.	US Marspich (10)	0–4	AS Saulnes Longlaville (8)
85.	COS Villers (7)	6–1	ASC Saulxures-lès-Nancy (9)
86.	RC Sommedieue (10)	1–4	US Behonne-Longeville-en-Barois (9)
87.	US Soucht (8)	3–1	AS Montbronn (9)
88.	US Spicheren (9)	0–3	US Forbach (6)
89.	CS Stiring-Wendel (9)	0–2	Sarreguemines FC (6)
90.	AS Talange (9)	0–1	FC Hagondange (8)
91.	GS Thiaucourt (10)	2–1	US Jarny (8)
92.	AS Tréveray (9)	0–3	Toul JCA (8)
93.	FC Dommartin-lès-Remiremont (11)	0–5	AS Vagney (8)
94.	ENJ Val-de-Seille (9)	1–0	FC Pulnoy (7)
95.	FC Val Dunois (11)	1–4	SF Verdun Belleville (8)
96.	FC L'Hôpital (11)	1–3	US Valmont (8)
97.	MJC Volmerange-lès-Boulay (8)	1–0	ES Metz (8)
98.	CS Volmerange-les-Mines (10)	1–3	JS Audunoise (9)
99.	FC Woippy (10)	0–7	RS Amanvillers (7)
100.	US Yutz (9)	0–4	Thionville FC (7)

==== Second round: Champagne-Ardenne ====
These matches were played on 12 and 13 September 2020.

Second round results: Grand Est - Champagne-Ardenne
Tie no	Home team (tier)	Score	Away team (tier)
1.	AS Asfeld (7)	3–0	Olympique Torcy-Sedan (7)
2.	US Bazeilles (8)	2–1	FC Haybes (9)
3.	FC Bogny (6)	2–1	FC Blagny-Carignan (7)
4.	AS Bourg-Rocroi (8)	5–1	US Revin (8)
5.	AS Cernay-Berru-Lavannes (7)	3–0	Bétheny FC (8)
6.	AS Cheminon (10)	0–2	ASPTT Châlons (7)
7.	AS Cheminots Châlons (10)	1–4	US Fismes Ardre et Vesle (8)
8.	Cheveuges-Saint-Aignan CO (10)	1–3	USA Le Chesne (7)
9.	Foyer Compertrix (9)	0–0 (5–3 p)	FC Christo (7)
10.	FC Conflans-sur-Seine (10)	1–5	FC Nogentais (6)
11.	FC Côte des Blancs (7)	4–0	AS Courtisols ESTAN (8)
12.	US Dienville (8)	1–3	FC Saint-Meziery (6)
13.	FC Épernay (7)	6–0	Châlons FCO (7)
14.	Espérance Saint-Dizier (8)	2–0	FC Joinville-Vecqueville (8)
15.	Entente Étoges-Vert (11)	4–2	US Châtelraould-Les Rivières-Henruel (10)
16.	ES Fagnières (8)	1–1 (3–5 p)	Cormontreuil FC (6)
17.	US Fumay-Charnois (8)	0–2	ES Charleville-Mézières (8)
18.	AS Gueux (10)	1–3	Vitry FC (8)
19.	FC Laville-aux-Bois (10)	1–0	CS Chalindrey (8)
20.	ES Gault-Soigny (9)	1–1 (3–4 p)	RC Sézanne (7)
21.	Liart-Signy-l'Abbaye FC (8)	0–3	CA Villers-Semeuse (7)
22.	CS Maranville-Rennepont (8)	2–4	US Éclaron (6)
23.	FC Métropole Troyenne (6)	1–0	JS Vaudoise (7)
24.	US Montier-en-Der (8)	0–0 (4–5 p)	Étoile Chapelaine (8)
25.	AS Mouzon (10)	4–0	ES Joigny (11)
26.	Nord Ardennes (8)	0–2	Olympique Charleville Neufmanil Aiglemont (8)
27.	FCF La Neuvillette-Jamin (8)	3–2	Nord Champagne FC (7)
28.	AS Poissons-Noncourt (9)	3–0	DS Eurville-Bienville (10)
29.	ES Prauthoy-Vaux (8)	1–2	ASPTT Chaumont (9)
30.	FC Prez Bourmont (9)	1–0	FC Saints-Geosmois (7)
31.	Renouveau Ramerupt (8)	0–5	RCS La Chapelle (6)
32.	US Rouvres (11)	1–4	Stade Chevillonnais (7)
33.	AS Sarrey-Montigny (7)	1–1 (4–2 p)	SC Marnaval (6)
34.	ES Saulces-Monclin (9)	0–2	Rethel SF (6)
35.	SC Savières (10)	1–0	ESC Melda (8)
36.	USS Sermaize (10)	2–6	US Avize-Grauves (6)
37.	AS Taissy (8)	4–0 (Note: Tie reversed from original draw.)	AS Saint-Brice-Courcelles (10)
38.	AF Valcourt (10)	2–2 (2–4 p)	Chaumont FC (6)
39.	AS Val de l'Aisne (8)	0–0 (4–5 p)	Le Theux FC (7)
40.	FC Vallant/Les Grès (9)	4–2	FC Morgendois (10)
41.	US Vendeuvre (8)	3–1	AS Chartreux (9)
42.	FC Villiers-en-Lieu (10)	1–3	SL Ornel (8)

==== Second round: Alsace ====
These matches were played on 12 and 13 September 2020, with one postponed to, and one replayed on, 20 September 2020.

Second round results: Grand Est - Alsace
Tie no	Home team (tier)	Score	Away team (tier)
1.	FC Wissembourg/Altenstadt (12)	1–9	FC Durrenbach (9)
2.	AS Altkirch (8)	0–9	FC Hégenheim (6)
3.	AS Andolsheim (11)	0–8	AS Sundhoffen (6)
4.	FC Artolsheim (11)	0–6	SC Sélestat (8)
5.	US Artzenheim (13)	1–4	FC Wintzfelden-Osenbach (8)
6.	AS Aspach-le-Haut (10)	1–7	FC Burnhaupt-le-Haut (7)
7.	ASI Avenir (8)	1–2	FC Sarrebourg (6)
8.	FC Avolsheim (13)	0–3 (Note: Tie won by means of forfeit.)	FC Eckbolsheim (8)
9.	US Baldenheim (8)	2–2 (5–6 p)	FC Rhinau (8)
10.	FC Batzendorf (13)	0–2	FC Soultz-sous-Forêts/Kutzenhausen (9)
11.	SS Beinheim (11)	2–1	FC Niederschaeffolsheim (11)
12.	FC Bennwihr (8)	2–1	FC Illhaeusern (8)
13.	AS Bergbieten (13)	1–4	ES Molsheim-Ernolsheim (7)
14.	US Colmar (9)	0–4	AS Ribeauvillé (7)
15.	FC Dangolsheim (12)	3–5	FC Krautergersheim (10)
16.	Entente Drachenbronn-Birlenbach (12)	1–1 (4–5 p)	FC Weitbruch (10)
17.	FC Drusenheim (7)	1–5	US Turcs Bischwiller (8)
18.	AS Durlinsdorf (11)	0–2	Mouloudia Mulhouse (8)
19.	ALFC Duttlenheim (8)	1–3	FCSR Obernai (7)
20.	FC Ensisheim (11)	6–2	FC Brunstatt (8)
21.	FC Entzheim (11)	0–4	CS Fegersheim (8)
22.	UJ Epfig (9)	1–3	SC Ebersheim (10)
23.	FC Ernolsheim-lès-Saverne (12)	0–4	US Reipertswiller (7)
24.	FC Eschau (9)	0–0 (5–4 p)	AS Strasbourg (8)
25.	AS Forstfeld (12)	1–5	FC Eschbach (10)
26.	FC Grussenheim (10)	6–2	FC Roderen (11)
27.	FC Gundolsheim (11)	2–0	US Vallée de la Thur (8)
28.	FC Hagenthal-Wentzwiller (9)	2–1	FC Kappelen (10)
29.	FC Herbsheim (11)	2–4	RC Kintzheim (9)
30.	AS Pfaffenheim (9)	0–1	AS Guémar (8)
31.	US Hindisheim (9)	0–3	AS Bischoffsheim (8)
32.	AC Hinterfeld (11)	0–4	AS Platania Gundershoffen (8)
33.	AS Hochstatt (12)	0–3	AS Huningue (7)
34.	AS Hoerdt (8)	3–1	FC Saint-Etienne Seltz (7)
35.	FC Hoffen (13)	1–2	SC Roppenheim (12)
36.	FC Illfurth (10)	1–2	FC Bartenheim (7)
37.	US Imbsheim (11)	1–4	AS Ingwiller/Menchhoffen (8)
38.	FR Jebsheim-Muntzenheim (10)	6–8	FC Buhl (10)
39.	SR Kaysersberg (8)	2–2 (5–3 p)	FC Ostheim-Houssen (8)
40.	FC Lampertheim (9)	0–4	FC Soleil Bischheim (6)
41.	FC Mackwiller (11)	3–1	FC Keskastel (9)
42.	SC Maisonsgoutte (13)	1–3	AS Heiligenstein (12)
43.	AS Marckolsheim (10)	0–4	FC Rossfeld (7)
44.	FC Matzenheim (10)	2–0	FC Bindernheim (9)
45.	AS Mertzen (9)	0–4	Alliance Muespach-Folgensbourg (10)
46.	AS Mertzwiller (9)	2–1	US Ittenheim (7)
47.	FC Meyenheim (8)	0–3	AS Raedersheim (8)
48.	Montreux Sports (9)	0–0 (2–4 p)	AS Heimsbrunn (9)
49.	FC Anatolie Mulhouse (10)	4–1	FC Seppois-Bisel (9)
50.	RC Mulhouse (10)	0–8	US Wittenheim (7)
51.	AS Mutzig (8)	2–2 (7–6 p)	FC Still 1930 (6)
52.	AS Natzwiller (11)	0–11	FC Geispolsheim 01 (6)
53.	FC Niederlauterbach (10)	1–7	FC Geudertheim (9)
54.	FC Niederrœdern/Olympique Schaffhouse (13)	0–2	Fatih-Sport Haguenau (11)
55.	FC Oberhausbergen (9)	0–3	AS Neudorf (8)
56.	FC Oberhergheim (12)	1–5	FC Niederhergheim (9)
57.	FC Oberhoffen (10)	1–1 (4–5 p)	AS Betschdorf (8)
58.	US Oberlauterbach (7)	2–0	US Preuschdorf-Langensoultzbach (8)
59.	FC Obermorschwiller (10)	2–2 (6–7 p)	AS Berrwiller-Hartsmannswiller (7)
60.	FC Ostwald (10)	0–16	FCO Strasbourg Koenigshoffen 06 (7)
61.	ES Pfettisheim (9)	9–0	US Ettendorf (10)
62.	FC Lingolsheim (10)	4–1 (Note: Tie reversed from original draw.)	CA Plobsheim (12)
63.	US Pulversheim FC (9)	1–9	AS Illzach Modenheim (6)
64.	FC Blue Star Reiningue (10)	0–7	AGIIR Florival (7)
65.	FCRS Richwiller (8)	4–1	FC Morschwiller-le-Bas (8)
66.	FC Riedisheim (8)	2–2 (3–2 p)	Cernay FC (8)
67.	FC Rouffach (8)	5–1	FC Fessenheim (8)
68.	SR Rountzenheim-Auenheim (9)	1–0	AS Seebach (10)
69.	FC Saverne (8)	2–0	SC Drulingen (7)
70.	US Scherwiller (9)	1–1 (3–4 p)	US Nordhouse (8)
71.	AS Schillersdorf (10)	1–0	AS Willgottheim (11)
72.	ASB Schirmeck-La Broque (9)	1–2	FC Kronenbourg Strasbourg (6)
73.	US Schleithal (9)	2–2 (5–4 p)	FCE Schirrhein (6)
74.	FR Sessenheim-Stattmatten (9)	2–4	AS Hunspach (8)
75.	FC Souffelweyersheim (9)	3–4 (Note: Original match was abandoned with the scoreline 1–2. Replay was ordered.)	ASL Robertsau (8)
76.	AS Saint-Pierre-Bois/Triembach-au-Val (10)	0–2	AS Erstein (6)
77.	FC Steinbrunn-le-Bas (10)	1–8	FC Pfastatt 1926 (8)
78.	FC Steinseltz (7)	1–1 (5–4 p)	SS Weyersheim (6)
79.	AS Elsau Portugais Strasbourg (7)	1–4	ASPV Strasbourg (6)
80.	AP Joie et Santé Strasbourg (9)	1–3	SC Red Star Strasbourg (10)
81.	CS Neuhof Strasbourg (9)	1–1 (5–4 p)	AS Mundolsheim (8)
82.	Strasbourg Université Club (11)	1–4	AS Musau Strasbourg (9)
83.	Thann FC 2017 (11)	2–3	SR Saint-Amarin (9)
84.	FC Traubach (10)	1–2	ASL Kœtzingue (7)
85.	FC Truchtersheim (9)	0–5	FC Obermodern (6)
86.	AS Weinbourg (11)	0–8	AS Ohlungen (8)
87.	AS Weyer (10)	1–5	Entente Trois Maisons-Phalsbourg (9)
88.	US Wimmenau (11)	1–5	AS Hochfelden (8)
89.	AS Wintzenheim (12)	2–1	SR Bergheim (10)
90.	AS Wisches-Russ-Lutzelhouse (10)	0–4	US Oberschaeffolsheim (8)
91.	AS Wœrth (12)	1–3	Entente Kaltenhouse/Marienthal (9)
92.	CS Wolxheim (12)	1–11	EB Achenheim (8)
93.	SR Zellwiller (11)	0–7	FC Dahlenheim (8)
94.	US Zimmersheim-Eschentzwiller (11)	1–4	AS Lutterbach (9)

=== Third round ===
These matches were played on 19 and 20 September 2020, with two postponed to 27 and 30 September 2020.

Third round results: Grand Est
Tie no	Home team (tier)	Score	Away team (tier)
1.	FC Weitbruch (10)	1–0	AS Hochfelden (8)
2.	FC Eschbach (10)	0–6	US Sarre-Union (5)
3.	FC Geudertheim (9)	0–6	US Turcs Bischwiller (8)
4.	AS Schillersdorf (10)	3–0	FC Mackwiller (11)
5.	SC Roppenheim (12)	0–4	US Schleithal (9)
6.	AS Ohlungen (8)	1–1 (4–5 p)	FC Steinseltz (7)
7.	FC Soultz-sous-Forêts/Kutzenhausen (9)	1–1 (7–6 p)	SR Rountzenheim-Auenheim (9)
8.	FC Durrenbach (9)	1–3	US Oberlauterbach (7)
9.	Entente Trois Maisons-Phalsbourg (9)	0–2	US Reipertswiller (7)
10.	Entente Kaltenhouse/Marienthal (9)	2–1	FC Saverne (8)
11.	FC Sarrebourg (6)	0–3	FC Obermodern (6)
12.	AS Platania Gundershoffen (8)	1–0	AS Mertzwiller (9)
13.	AS Betschdorf (8)	0–3	AS Hoerdt (8)
14.	AS Ingwiller/Menchhoffen (8)	4–0	AS Hunspach (8)
15.	Fatih-Sport Haguenau (11)	3–1	SS Beinheim (11)
16.	AS Heiligenstein (12)	2–2 (3–4 p)	CS Neuhof Strasbourg (9)
17.	FC Dahlenheim (8)	2–1	AS Bischoffsheim (8)
18.	SC Red Star Strasbourg (10)	1–6	FC Soleil Bischheim (6)
19.	ES Pfettisheim (9)	3–0	FC Eschau (9)
20.	ES Molsheim-Ernolsheim (7)	1–2 (Note: Tie reversed from previous round.)	ASL Robertsau (8)
21.	AS Neudorf (8)	1–2	AS Erstein (6)
22.	CS Fegersheim (8)	1–2	FA Illkirch Graffenstaden (5)
23.	US Oberschaeffolsheim (8)	1–6	ASPV Strasbourg (6)
24.	FC Lingolsheim (10)	0–2	FC Eckbolsheim (8)
25.	FC Geispolsheim 01 (6)	1–3	FCO Strasbourg Koenigshoffen 06 (7)
26.	FC Krautergersheim (10)	2–1	AS Musau Strasbourg (9)
27.	EB Achenheim (8)	0–5	FC Kronenbourg Strasbourg (6)
28.	SR Saint-Amarin (9)	1–3	FC Rossfeld (7)
29.	FC Niederhergheim (9)	5–2	SC Ebersheim (10)
30.	SC Sélestat (8)	1–4	AS Mutzig (8)
31.	FCSR Obernai (7)	4–1	US Nordhouse (8)
32.	AGIIR Florival (7)	3–0	FC Riedisheim (8)
33.	FC Grussenheim (10)	1–3	FC Ensisheim (11)
34.	FC Matzenheim (10)	0–0 (3–5 p)	FC Rhinau (8)
35.	AS Guémar (8)	2–1	RC Kintzheim (9)
36.	FC Bennwihr (8)	0–10	Stadium Racing Colmar (5)
37.	AS Ribeauvillé (7)	3–2	AS Sundhoffen (6)
38.	FC Buhl (10)	1–5	ASC Biesheim (5)
39.	AS Wintzenheim (12)	2–2 (3–4 p)	SR Kaysersberg (8)
40.	FC Hagenthal-Wentzwiller (9)	1–3	FC Anatolie Mulhouse (10)
41.	FC Burnhaupt-le-Haut (7)	1–3	AS Illzach Modenheim (6)
42.	FC Rouffach (8)	0–4	FC Hégenheim (6)
43.	FC Wintzfelden-Osenbach (8)	1–7	FC Mulhouse (5)
44.	US Wittenheim (7)	2–3	AS Huningue (7)
45.	AS Lutterbach (9)	0–2	Mouloudia Mulhouse (8)
46.	FC Gundolsheim (11)	0–2	ASL Kœtzingue (7)
47.	FC Pfastatt 1926 (8)	0–1	AS Heimsbrunn (9)
48.	FCRS Richwiller (8)	0–4	FC Saint-Louis Neuweg (5)
49.	Alliance Muespach-Folgensbourg (10)	2–2 (5–6 p)	AS Raedersheim (8)
50.	AS Berrwiller-Hartsmannswiller (7)	4–0	FC Bartenheim (7)
51.	US Valmont (8)	4–1	MJC Volmerange-lès-Boulay (8)
52.	ES Rimling-Erching-Obergailbach (11)	1–1 (6–7 p)	AS Mouterhouse (10)
53.	FC Abreschviller (10)	3–5	USF Farébersviller (8)
54.	AS Bliesbruck (8)	0–2	AS Morhange (7)
55.	FC Hambach (10)	0–0 (5–6 p)	USF Brouderdorff (10)
56.	AS Le Val-de-Guéblange (10)	3–1	AS Bettborn Hellering (8)
57.	FC Francaltroff (11)	1–4	US Soucht (8)
58.	CS Philippsbourg (11)	0–8	CA Boulay (6)
59.	Sarreguemines FC (6)	1–4	US Raon-l'Étape (5)
60.	SR Creutzwald 03 (8)	0–1	Étoile Naborienne Saint-Avold (6)
61.	US Schneckenbusch (10)	1–6	Achen-Etting-Schmittviller (7)
62.	AS Neunkirch (8)	0–0 (7–6 p)	FC Hochwald (8)
63.	US Nousseviller (6)	1–1 (11–12 p)	US Forbach (6)
64.	SSEP Hombourg-Haut (7)	5–1	ES Petite-Rosselle (8)
65.	ES Heillecourt (7)	2–3	AC Blainville-Damelevières (7)
66.	Saulcy FC (9)	0–6	ES Thaon (5)
67.	GS Haroué-Benney (7)	0–3	ES Avière Darnieulles (8)
68.	US Lamarche (10)	0–7	FC Sainte-Marguerite (8)
69.	ES Bayon-Roville (10)	3–1	FC Revigny (9)
70.	FC Haute Moselotte (9)	3–0	AS Nomexy-Vincey (9)
71.	SR Saint-Dié (8)	– (Note: Match abandoned with the scoreline 0–2, due to an altercation between home supporters and the referee. SR Saint-Dié penalised. US Vandœuvre qualify.)	US Vandœuvre (6)
72.	AS Vagney (8)	0–2	FC Remiremont Saint-Étienne (8)
73.	SR Pouxeux Jarménil (10)	0–2	Bulgnéville Contrex Vittel FC (8)
74.	FC Dombasle-sur-Meurthe (8)	0–0 (4–5 p)	FC Houdemont (9)
75.	Toul JCA (8)	1–1 (3–4 p)	RC Champigneulles (6)
76.	US Behonne-Longeville-en-Barois (9)	0–3	FC Saint-Max-Essey (7)
77.	FJEP Magnières (10)	1–0	AS Lay-Saint-Christophe/Bouxieres-aux-Dames (8)
78.	GS Neuves-Maisons (7)	2–0	Entente Sorcy Void-Vacon (7)
79.	AS Colombey (10)	2–2 (0–3 p)	ENJ Val-de-Seille (9)
80.	FC Toul (9)	0–6	COS Villers (7)
81.	FC Lunéville (6)	1–3	Jarville JF (6)
82.	JS Audunoise (9)	2–2 (4–3 p)	US Thierville (8)
83.	AS Algrange (8)	2–1	FC Hettange-Grande (7)
84.	GS Thiaucourt (10)	1–6	AS Portugais Saint-Francois Thionville (7)
85.	SF Verdun Belleville (8)	4–1	CSP Réhon (9)
86.	US Pagny-sur-Moselle (6)	0–2	USAG Uckange (7)
87.	ES Fameck (7)	0–2	FC Bassin Piennois (6)
88.	US ACLI Metz (10)	2–1	Entente Vigneulles-Hannonville-Fresne (8)
89.	AG Metzervisse (9)	0–1	AS Saulnes Longlaville (8)
90.	US Etain-Buzy (7)	1–2	ES Villerupt-Thil (6)
91.	CS Godbrange (8)	2–1	CS&O Blénod-Pont-à-Mousson (7)
92.	US Oudrenne (9)	0–2	RS Magny (7)
93.	AS Konacker (10)	0–11	ESAP Metz (7)
94.	ES Rosselange Vitry (8)	6–1	APM Metz (6)
95.	FC Verny-Louvigny-Cuvry (9)	1–1 (4–2 p)	RS Amanvillers (7)
96.	AS Saint-Julien-lès-Metz (7)	2–2 (0–2 p)	SC Marly (8)
97.	CSO Amnéville (5)	4–1	FC Trémery (6)
98.	AF Os Conquistadors Metz (10)	2–0	FC Hagondange (8)
99.	FC Château-Salins (9)	0–2	Thionville FC (7)
100.	AS Anzeling Edling (11)	1–2	ES Woippy (9)
101.	ES Gandrange (7)	2–1	ES Courcelles-sur-Nied (8)
102.	Rethel SF (6)	2–1	ASPTT Châlons (7)
103.	AS Mouzon (10)	1–5	AS Taissy (8)
104.	Vitry FC (8)	4–1	FC Côte des Blancs (7)
105.	ES Charleville-Mézières (8)	0–0 (4–5 p)	AS Bourg-Rocroi (8)
106.	Olympique Charleville Neufmanil Aiglemont (8)	2–5	FC Bogny (6)
107.	AS Asfeld (7)	1–2	FCF La Neuvillette-Jamin (8)
108.	EF Reims Sainte-Anne Châtillons (6)	9–0	Entente Étoges-Vert (11)
109.	US Avize-Grauves (6)	2–3	AS Prix-lès-Mézières (5)
110.	US Fismes Ardre et Vesle (8)	0–2	AS Cernay-Berru-Lavannes (7)
111.	Foyer Compertrix (9)	0–0 (1–3 p)	CA Villers-Semeuse (7)
112.	USA Le Chesne (7)	1–1 (2–4 p)	US Bazeilles (8)
113.	RC Sézanne (7)	1–1 (3–4 p)	Le Theux FC (7)
114.	Cormontreuil FC (6)	1–1 (8–9 p)	FC Nogentais (6)
115.	AS Poissons-Noncourt (9)	1–2	FC Prez Bourmont (9)
116.	RC Épernay Champagne (5)	2–2 (5–4 p)	RCS La Chapelle (6)
117.	FC Laville-aux-Bois (10)	1–0	SC Savières (10)
118.	US Vendeuvre (8)	0–3	FC Métropole Troyenne (6)
119.	AS Sarrey-Montigny (7)	8–2	FC Épernay (7)
120.	FC Saint-Meziery (6)	5–0	Stade Chevillonnais (7)
121.	ASPTT Chaumont (9)	0–2	US Éclaron (6)
122.	Étoile Chapelaine (8)	2–1	FC Vallant/Les Grès (9)
123.	SL Ornel (8)	0–8	Chaumont FC (6)
124.	Espérance Saint-Dizier (8)	1–2	Bar-le-Duc FC (6)

=== Fourth round ===
These matches were played on 3 and 4 October 2020, with two postponed to 11 October 2020.

Fourth round results: Grand Est
Tie no	Home team (tier)	Score	Away team (tier)
1.	Le Theux FC (7)	0–0 (4–2 p)	FC Bogny (6)
2.	FC Saint-Meziery (6)	4–0 (Note: Tie reversed from original draw.)	AS Cernay-Berru-Lavannes (7)
3.	US Éclaron (6)	1–1 (4–5 p)	CA Villers-Semeuse (7)
4.	FC Métropole Troyenne (6)	1–1 (4–3 p)	Bar-le-Duc FC (6)
5.	AS Bourg-Rocroi (8)	0–3	RC Épernay Champagne (5)
6.	AS Prix-lès-Mézières (5)	2–0	FC Nogentais (6)
7.	AS Sarrey-Montigny (7)	2–1	Vitry FC (8)
8.	FC Laville-aux-Bois (10)	0–5	AS Taissy (8)
9.	Étoile Chapelaine (8)	0–7	EF Reims Sainte-Anne Châtillons (6)
10.	Chaumont FC (6)	3–0	Rethel SF (6)
11.	FCF La Neuvillette-Jamin (8)	0–5	CS Sedan Ardennes (4)
12.	FC Prez Bourmont (9)	0–2	US Bazeilles (8)
13.	AC Blainville-Damelevières (7)	6–1	SC Marly (8)
14.	COS Villers (7)	0–0 (5–4 p)	SF Verdun Belleville (8)
15.	FC Saint-Max-Essey (7)	0–0 (6–5 p)	AS Morhange (7)
16.	FC Verny-Louvigny-Cuvry (9)	0–3	Jarville JF (6)
17.	AS Portugais Saint-Francois Thionville (7)	2–1	FC Remiremont Saint-Étienne (8)
18.	US Vandœuvre (6)	2–1	GS Neuves-Maisons (7)
19.	FC Haute Moselotte (9)	2–1	FJEP Magnières (10)
20.	ENJ Val-de-Seille (9)	2–1	Thionville FC (7)
21.	ES Bayon-Roville (10)	1–1 (3–5 p)	Bulgnéville Contrex Vittel FC (8)
22.	FC Houdemont (9)	0–3	ES Woippy (9)
23.	FC Sainte-Marguerite (8)	0–4	ES Thaon (5)
24.	ES Avière Darnieulles (8)	0–3	SAS Épinal (4)
25.	ESAP Metz (7)	1–1 (4–3 p)	RC Champigneulles (6)
26.	Achen-Etting-Schmittviller (7)	2–7	AS Algrange (8)
27.	USAG Uckange (7)	– (Note: Match abandoned by the referee after 41 minutes, with the scoreline 1–1, after threatening behaviour from visiting players and a projectile being thrown from the crowd. USF Farébersviller penalised. USAG Uckange qualify.)	USF Farébersviller (8)
28.	AS Saulnes Longlaville (8)	1–2	ES Gandrange (7)
29.	US Forbach (6)	0–1	ES Villerupt-Thil (6)
30.	RS Magny (7)	0–7	CSO Amnéville (5)
31.	AS Le Val-de-Guéblange (10)	0–3	Étoile Naborienne Saint-Avold (6)
32.	ES Rosselange Vitry (8)	2–0	AS Neunkirch (8)
33.	FC Bassin Piennois (6)	1–3	SSEP Hombourg-Haut (7)
34.	USF Brouderdorff (10)	2–5	US Valmont (8)
35.	AF Os Conquistadors Metz (10)	1–7	US Raon-l'Étape (5)
36.	AS Mouterhouse (10)	1–0	US Soucht (8)
37.	CS Godbrange (8)	1–3	JS Audunoise (9)
38.	US ACLI Metz (10)	1–4	CA Boulay (6)
39.	AS Platania Gundershoffen (8)	1–9	FCSR Haguenau (4)
40.	FC Eckbolsheim (8)	0–2	US Sarre-Union (5)
41.	Entente Kaltenhouse/Marienthal (9)	0–1	FC Obermodern (6)
42.	Fatih-Sport Haguenau (11)	0–3	US Schleithal (9)
43.	FC Soultz-sous-Forêts/Kutzenhausen (9)	0–5	FCO Strasbourg Koenigshoffen 06 (7)
44.	AS Schillersdorf (10)	1–4	ASL Robertsau (8)
45.	ES Pfettisheim (9)	0–2	US Oberlauterbach (7)
46.	AS Hoerdt (8)	1–0	FC Kronenbourg Strasbourg (6)
47.	FC Steinseltz (7)	0–3	FA Illkirch Graffenstaden (5)
48.	US Reipertswiller (7)	4–3	US Turcs Bischwiller (8)
49.	CS Neuhof Strasbourg (9)	2–4	FC Soleil Bischheim (6)
50.	FC Weitbruch (10)	1–5	Stadium Racing Colmar (5)
51.	FC Dahlenheim (8)	1–0	AS Ingwiller/Menchhoffen (8)
52.	SR Kaysersberg (8)	2–1	FCSR Obernai (7)
53.	AS Heimsbrunn (9)	1–1 (3–2 p)	FC Niederhergheim (9)
54.	AS Huningue (7)	1–1 (4–3 p)	AS Erstein (6)
55.	FC Anatolie Mulhouse (10)	2–4	FC Rhinau (8)
56.	AS Mutzig (8)	0–3	ASL Kœtzingue (7)
57.	AS Guémar (8)	1–5	FC Hégenheim (6)
58.	FC Saint-Louis Neuweg (5)	2–1	ASPV Strasbourg (6)
59.	FC Krautergersheim (10)	0–3	AS Berrwiller-Hartsmannswiller (7)
60.	AS Raedersheim (8)	0–1	AS Ribeauvillé (7)
61.	ASC Biesheim (5)	3–2	AS Illzach Modenheim (6)
62.	FC Rossfeld (7)	1–4	SC Schiltigheim (4)
63.	FC Ensisheim (11)	3–5	AGIIR Florival (7)
64.	Mouloudia Mulhouse (8)	0–8	FC Mulhouse (5)

=== Fifth round ===
These matches were played on 17 and 18 October 2020.

Fifth round results: Grand Est
Tie no	Home team (tier)	Score	Away team (tier)
1.	AS Taissy (8)	1–5	FC Saint-Meziery (6)
2.	Chaumont FC (6)	0–0 (2–4 p)	AS Prix-lès-Mézières (5)
3.	AS Algrange (8)	0–3	CS Sedan Ardennes (4)
4.	US Bazeilles (8)	0–3	RC Épernay Champagne (5)
5.	EF Reims Sainte-Anne Châtillons (6)	5–0	AS Sarrey-Montigny (7)
6.	JS Audunoise (9)	0–2	COS Villers (7)
7.	CA Villers-Semeuse (7)	1–3	FC Métropole Troyenne (6)
8.	ES Villerupt-Thil (6)	2–1	Le Theux FC (7)
9.	SC Schiltigheim (4)	2–2 (5–4 p)	Stadium Racing Colmar (5)
10.	FC Soleil Bischheim (6)	1–1 (5–4 p)	FC Mulhouse (5)
11.	FC Hégenheim (6)	1–3	FCO Strasbourg Koenigshoffen 06 (7)
12.	FC Rhinau (8)	0–2	AS Ribeauvillé (7)
13.	FC Haute Moselotte (9)	0–3	FC Saint-Louis Neuweg (5)
14.	ASL Kœtzingue (7)	3–0	AS Huningue (7)
15.	AS Berrwiller-Hartsmannswiller (7)	0–1	AGIIR Florival (7)
16.	SR Kaysersberg (8)	0–0 (1–4 p)	AS Heimsbrunn (9)
17.	ES Gandrange (7)	0–3	ES Thaon (5)
18.	Bulgnéville Contrex Vittel FC (8)	0–2	AS Portugais Saint-Francois Thionville (7)
19.	CSO Amnéville (5)	2–0	US Raon-l'Étape (5)
20.	ESAP Metz (7)	1–1 (4–5 p)	FC Saint-Max-Essey (7)
21.	ENJ Val-de-Seille (9)	0–3	US Vandœuvre (6)
22.	ES Woippy (9)	0–7	SAS Épinal (4)
23.	AC Blainville-Damelevières (7)	1–1 (5–4 p)	USAG Uckange (7)
24.	ES Rosselange Vitry (8)	2–1	Jarville JF (6)
25.	US Oberlauterbach (7)	0–2	FCSR Haguenau (4)
26.	US Valmont (8)	2–1	FC Dahlenheim (8)
27.	ASL Robertsau (8)	1–11	US Sarre-Union (5)
28.	SSEP Hombourg-Haut (7)	1–0	Étoile Naborienne Saint-Avold (6)
29.	AS Mouterhouse (10)	0–3	ASC Biesheim (5)
30.	US Schleithal (9)	1–3	FC Obermodern (6)
31.	AS Hoerdt (8)	3–4	FA Illkirch Graffenstaden (5)
32.	CA Boulay (6)	1–2	US Reipertswiller (7)

=== Sixth round ===
These matches were played on 30 and 31 January 2021.

Sixth round results: Grand Est
Tie no	Home team (tier)	Score	Away team (tier)
1.	AS Ribeauvillé (7)	1–1 (4–3 p)	AGIIR Florival (7)
2.	US Valmont (8)	0–3	FC Soleil Bischheim (6)
3.	FC Obermodern (6)	2–2 (3–1 p)	US Sarre-Union (5)
4.	ASC Biesheim (5)	0–6	SC Schiltigheim (4)
5.	FCO Strasbourg Koenigshoffen 06 (7)	3–0	US Reipertswiller (7)
6.	FCSR Haguenau (4)	3–0 (Note: FA Illkirch Graffenstaden forfeited the tie, stating they would not play under the current conditions relating to COVID 19.)	FA Illkirch Graffenstaden (5)
7.	ASL Kœtzingue (7)	0–1	SSEP Hombourg-Haut (7)
8.	FC Saint-Louis Neuweg (5)	6–0 (Note: Tie reversed from original draw.)	AS Heimsbrunn (9)
9.	ES Villerupt-Thil (6)	0–5	CS Sedan Ardennes (4)
10.	COS Villers (7)	0–3	SAS Épinal (4)
11.	FC Saint-Meziery (6)	1–1 (3–1 p)	US Vandœuvre (6)
12.	RC Épernay Champagne (5)	2–3	EF Reims Sainte-Anne Châtillons (6)
13.	AC Blainville-Damelevières (7)	0–7	CSO Amnéville (5)
14.	AS Portugais Saint-Francois Thionville (7)	1–1 (3–1 p)	ES Rosselange Vitry (8)
15.	FC Saint-Max-Essey (7)	0–3	AS Prix-lès-Mézières (5)
16.	FC Métropole Troyenne (6)	0–1	ES Thaon (5)
