= AS Algrange =

French football club

- Full name: Association Sportive Algrange
- Founded: 2000
- Ground: Stade Batzental, Algrange
- Capacity: 3,000
- League: La Division d'Honneur, Lorraine
- 2008–09: CFA2 Group C, 16th (relegated)

Association Sportive Algrange is a French association football team. They are based in Algrange, France and are currently playing in the La Division d'Honneur, Lorraine, the sixth tier in the French football league system.

Algrange reached the 8th round of the 2000–01 Coupe de France, losing on penalties to Levallois SC.
