= 2018–19 Coupe de France preliminary rounds, Grand Est =

The 2018–19 Coupe de France preliminary rounds, Grand Est was the qualifying competition to decide which teams from the leagues of the Grand Est region of France took part in the main competition from the seventh round.

== First round ==
The first round qualifiers for the regional league of Grand Est were organised separately by the three constituent sectors.

=== Alsace ===
These matches were played on 6, 13, 14, 15, 16, 17, 19 and 20 June and 12 August 2018 in Alsace. Tiers shown reflect the 2017–18 season.

First round results: Alsace
Tie no	Home team (tier)	Score	Away team (tier)
1.	EB Achenheim (9)	0–2	FC Eckbolsheim (8)
2.	FC Alteckendorf (11)	2–0 (a.e.t.)	Entente de la Mossig Wasselonne/Romanswiller (11)
3.	FC Avolsheim (13)	0–3	AS Mutzig (8)
4.	FC Balbronn (13)	0–1	US Innenheim (10)
5.	FC Battenheim (11)	1–6	US Vallée de la Thur (9)
6.	FC Batzendorf (13)	1–6	FC Durrenbach (10)
7.	US Turcs Bischwiller (9)	1–0 (Note: Tie switched at the request of both clubs.)	SS Beinheim (11)
8.	ASLC Berstett (13)	0–3 (Note: Tie won by forfeit.)	FC Wingersheim (10)
9.	AS Betschdorf (9)	2–1	FC Eschbach (8)
10.	FC Bindernheim (11)	0–1	FC Rhinau (10)
11.	AS Blodelsheim (12)	0–3	FC Meyenheim (9)
12.	FC Bollwiller (12)	1–4	AS Rixheim (9)
13.	US Bouxwiller (11)	2–1	FC Keskastel (9)
14.	FC Brunstatt (9)	1–3	Mouloudia Mulhouse (8)
15.	St Georges Carspach (12)	0–3	FC Rosenau (11)
16.	US Dachstein (11)	3–1	AS Niedernai (12)
17.	US Dalhunden (12)	3–4 (a.e.t.)	Entente Laubach/Forstheim (12)
18.	FC Dambach Neunhoffen (13)	1–3	FC Geudertheim (10)
19.	RC Dannemarie (11)	6–0	SR St Amarin (8)
20.	SC Dettwiller (11)	2–4	AS Ingwiller/Menchhoffen (10)
21.	AS Dingsheim-Griesheim (13)	2–1	FC Schnersheim (12)
22.	SC Dinsheim (12)	3–5	CS Fegersheim (9)
23.	SR Dorlisheim (12)	1–5	AS Portugais Barembach-Bruche (12)
24.	FC Dossenheim-sur-Zinsel (11)	1–5	AS Butten-Diemeringen (9)
25.	Entente Drachenbronn-Birlenbach (16)	2–6	FC Oberroedern/Aschbach (10)
26.	FC Drusenheim (8)	6–1	FC Steinseltz (8)
27.	USL Duppigheim (10)	1–1 (3–2 p)	FC Dahlenheim (9)
28.	AS Durlinsdorf (11)	0–1	FC Petit-Landau (12)
29.	AS Durmenach (12)	0–3	Alliance Muespach-Folgensbourg (11)
30.	FC Ebersmunster (15)	0–6	US Sundhouse (12)
31.	FC Ensisheim (12)	1–9	FC Wintzfelden-Osenbach (9)
32.	UJ Epfig (11)	3–2	ASPTT Strasbourg (12)
33.	FC Ernolsheim-lès-Saverne (12)	1–0	FC Steinbourg (12)
34.	US Ettendorf (11)	0–3	AS Hochfelden (8)
35.	FC Fessenheim (9)	2–0	FC Hirtzfelden (8)
36.	SR Furdenheim (9)	void (Note: LS Molsheim merged with AS Ernolsheim-sur-Bruche in June 2018 and were therefore not eligible to compete in the competition. SR Furdenheim qualify.)	LS Molsheim (8)
37.	FC Grendelbruch (12)	3–2	ES Haslach-Urmatt (13)
38.	FC Grentzingen (10)	2–4 (a.e.t.)	ASCCO Helfrantzkirch (11)
39.	FC Gries (13)	0–3	FC Oberhoffen (11)
40.	FC Grussenheim (10)	1–2	AS Sermersheim (9)
41.	AS Guémar (10)	1–2	AS Gerstheim (10)
42.	FC Gundolsheim (11)	1–5	AS Red Star Mulhouse (9)
43.	FC Habsheim (9)	3–1 (a.e.t.)	SC Cernay (8)
44.	AS Hausgauen (11)	5–2	Entente Hagenbach-Balschwiller (10)
45.	AS Heiligenstein (11)	8–1	FC Barr (12)
46.	FC Heiteren (10)	0–2 (a.e.t.)	FR Jebsheim-Muntzenheim (11)
47.	FC Herbsheim (11)	2–7	AS Westhouse (10)
48.	FC Herrlisheim (9)	5–1 (a.e.t.)	AS Gambsheim (8)
49.	FC Hessenheim (13)	2–6	FCI Riquewihr (10)
50.	FC Colmar Unifié (11)	3–2	FC Hilsenheim (12)
51.	AC Hinterfeld (12)	1–7	FC Schweighouse-sur-Moder (9)
52.	SR Hoenheim (9)	0–1	AS Reichstett (10)
53.	FC Hoffen (13)	0–5	Entente Mothern Munchhausen (11)
54.	AS Holtzheim (9)	0–1	ES Pfettisheim (10)
55.	FC Horbourg-Wihr (10)	2–3	AS Munster (9)
56.	FC Illfurth (10)	1–2	Montreux Sports (9)
57.	Entente Kaltenhouse/Marienthal (9)	2–1	AS Neudorf (9)
58.	FC Kappelen (10)	2–3 (a.e.t.)	FC Uffheim (8)
59.	FC Kertzfeld (13)	2–4	ES Stotzheim (11)
60.	AS Kilstett (9)	0–3	FCO Strasbourg Koenigshoffen 06 (8)
61.	RC Kintzheim (10)	3–4	FC Ostheim-Houssen (8)
62.	FC Kogenheim (11)	2–4	AS Portugais Sélestat (9)
63.	FC Krautergersheim (11)	8–2	AS Villé 2010 (12)
64.	AS Kurtzenhouse (13)	3–0	US Niederbronn-les-Bains (10)
65.	FC Lampertheim (9)	1–6	US Oberschaeffolsheim (8)
66.	FC Lampertsloch-Merkswiller (13)	1–2	FC Altenstadt/Wissembourg (11)
67.	AS St Barthelemy Leutenheim (13)	3–2 (a.e.t.)	AS Forstfeld (12)
68.	FC Lingolsheim (11)	3–2	La Wantzenau FC (10)
69.	FC Schwindratzheim (13)	1–2 (a.e.t.)	FC Lixhausen (13)
70.	AS Lupstein (10)	2–5	FA Val de Moder (10)
71.	AS Lutterbach (9)	3–1	AS Blanc Vieux-Thann (8)
72.	FC Mackwiller (12)	2–0	FC Oermingen (12)
73.	FC Marlenheim-Kirchheim (11)	4–5 (a.e.t.)	FC Schaffhouse-sur-Zorn (11)
74.	FC Masevaux (12)	1–5	AS Burnhaupt-le-Bas (10)
75.	FC Matzenheim (12)	0–7	AS Ribeauvillé (9)
76.	ES Morsbronn-les-Bains (13)	0–3	FC Weitbruch (10)
77.	FC Morschwiller-le-Bas (9)	2–1 (a.e.t.)	FC Sentheim (9)
78.	FC Mulhausen (13)	1–2	ASL Duntzenheim (10)
79.	FC Anatolie Mulhouse (10)	1–4	AS Altkirch (8)
80.	Amical Antillais Mulhouse (12)	0–3	US Hésingue (10)
81.	Étoile Mulhouse (12)	0–2	FC Steinbrunn-le-Bas (10)
82.	RC Mulhouse (9)	0–1	Real Mulhouse CF (8)
83.	FC Munchhouse (9)	5–6	FC Ingersheim (8)
84.	FC Rossfeld (8)	8–1	AS Mussig (10)
85.	AS Natzwiller (11)	3–1	FC Ostwald (10)
86.	FC Niederhausbergen (11)	2–3	AS Pfulgriesheim (11)
87.	FC Niederhergheim (9)	2–0	'FC Ste Croix-en-Plaine (8)
88.	FC Niederlauterbach (12)	3–0 (Note: AS Hatten penalised for currently unknown reasons. Original scoreline 1–3. FC Niederlauterbach qualify)	AS Hatten (12)
89.	FC Niederschaeffolsheim (11)	3–1	FC Bischwiller (12)
90.	AS Niffer (10)	6–1	FC Feldkirch (10)
91.	US Nordhouse (9)	6–2	US Hindisheim (8)
92.	FC Oberhergeim (11)	0–3	FC Merxheim (9)
93.	FC Obermorschwiller (10)	1–2	CS Mulhouse Bourtzwiller (8)
94.	Entente Oderen-Kruth (12)	0–2	US Oberbruck Dolleren (10)
95.	SC Ottmarsheim (9)	6–0	US Azzurri Mulhouse (9)
96.	AS Pfaffenheim (10)	3–0	ASCF Colmar 2009 (11)
97.	CA Plobsheim (12)	4–2	FC Boersch (11)
98.	FC Quatzenheim (12)	1–0 (a.e.t.)	FC Dangolsheim (12)
99.	FC Réguisheim (10)	2–3	AS Ober-Niederentzen (10)
100.	FCE Reichshoffen (13)	0–7	US Gumbrechtshoffen (11)
101.	FC Blue Star Reiningue (10)	2–4 (a.e.t.)	FCRS Richwiller (11)
102.	FC Roderen (10)	3–3 (4–3 p)	FC Lauw (11)
103.	SC Rœschwoog (10)	0–2	AS Hunspach (8)
104.	FC Rohrwiller (12)	1–4	AS Ohlungen (8)
105.	FC Rosheim (11)	– (Note: The match was abandoned. FC Rosheim were subsequently penalised, AS Bischoffsheim qualify)	AS Bischoffsheim (8)
106.	FC Rouffach (11)	1–3	SR Kaysersberg (9)
107.	SR Rountzenheim-Auenheim (11)	5–0	FC Soufflenheim (11)
108.	AS St Etienne Salmbach (12)	4–7	FC Riedseltz/Rott (10)
109.	AS Sarrewerden (13)	0–1	FC Monswiller (11)
110.	FC Sausheim (9)	0–2	FC Pfastatt 1926 (8)
111.	US Scherwiller (9)	6–2	FC Artolsheim (11)
112.	AS Schillersdorf (13)	1–5	US Imbsheim (12)
113.	ASB Schirmeck-La Broque (11)	2–0	OC Lipsheim (10)
114.	US Schleithal (9)	2–1	US Preuschdorf-Langensoultzbach (10)
115.	AS Schlierbach (11)	2–3	FC Bartenheim (8)
116.	AS Schœnau (12)	3–1	AS Andolsheim (10)
117.	Entente Schœnenbourg-Memmelshoffen (11)	1–3	FC Scheibenhard (11)
118.	FC Schwenheim (13)	1–9	FC Phalsbourg (10)
119.	AS Seebach (11)	0–1	SC Rittershoffen (11)
120.	FC Sélestat (9)	4–5	Racing HW 96 (8)
121.	FC Seppois (9)	2–1	AS Raedersdorf (9)
122.	FR Sessenheim-Stattmatten (10)	0–3	AS Hoerdt (8)
123.	AS Sigolsheim (11)	1–3	SC Ebersheim (9)
124.	FC Soultz (10)	1–4	AS Raedersheim (8)
125.	AS St Pierre-Bois/Triembah-au-Val (10)	3–0	AS Wisches-Russ-Lutzelhouse (10)
126.	AS Strasbourg (9)	2–5	Olympique Strasbourg (8)
127.	AS Educative Cité de l'Ill (9)	3–2	FC Souffelweyersheim (8)
128.	FC Egalité Strasbourg (13)	0–6	AS Musau Strasbourg (12)
129.	AS Électricité Strasbourg (11)	3–1	US Hangenbieten (12)
130.	AP Joie et Santé Strasbourg (10)	4–1	FC Breuschwickersheim (10)
131.	CS Strasbourg Neuhof (9)	1–3 (a.e.t.)	FC Ecrivains-Schiltigheim-Bischheim (10)
132.	SC Red Star Strasbourg (11)	2–1	SC Gaz de Strasbourg (12)
133.	FC Stockfeld Colombes (11)	3–8	CS Hautepierre Strasbourg (11)
134.	Strasbourg Université Club (11)	5–2	Fatih-Sport Haguenau (10)
135.	FC Tagsdorf (10)	4–3 (a.e.t.)	AS Riespach (9)
136.	Thann FC (15)	1–7	AS Aspach-le-Haut (10)
137.	FC Traubach (11)	1–4	AS Huningue (8)
138.	US Trois Maisons (10)	2–3	ASI Avenir (8)
139.	AS Mundolsheim (10)	1–0	FC Truchtersheim (10)
140.	AS Turckheim (11)	0–2	US Baldenheim (9)
141.	AS Uhrwiller (11)	4–1	ASC Brotsch-Marmoutier (12)
142.	FC Vendenheim (13)	0–4	ES Offendorf (12)
143.	FC Village Neuf (11)	2–1	US Hirsingue (8)
144.	AS Wahlenheim-Bernolsheim (13)	2–3 (a.e.t.)	FC Kindwiller (11)
145.	FC Waldolwisheim (13)	0–3	US Mommenheim (11)
146.	FC Walheim (12)	0–4	AS Mertzen (9)
147.	AS Weinbourg (12)	3–0	CSIE Harskirchen (12)
148.	FC Wettolsheim (10)	4–1	ASCA Wittelsheim (8)
149.	SR Widensolen (12)	4–1 (a.e.t.)	AS Marckolsheim (12)
150.	ES Wihr-au-Val (12)	0–4	US Colmar (9)
151.	AS Willgottheim (12)	1–2	FC Dauendorf (12)
152.	US Wimmenau (11)	0–6	CS Waldhambach (10)
153.	AS Wingen-sur-Moder (11)	0–0 (8–7 p)	AS Weyer (10)
154.	AS Wintzenheim (12)	4–4 (5–4 p)	AS Benfeld (13)
155.	ASTR Wittenheim (12)	3–0 (Note: FC Buhl penalised for currently unknown reasons. Original scoreline 3–3 (3–4 p). ASTR Wittenheim qualify)	FC Buhl (11)
156.	AS Wittersdorf (11)	1–5	FC Bantzenheim (8)
157.	US Wittersheim (10)	2–0	AS Mertzwiller (10)
158.	FC Wittisheim (11)	3–10	SR Bergheim (10)
159.	AS Wœrth (12)	2–3	AS Espagnols Schiltigheim (13)
160.	FC Wolfgantzen (12)	1–3	Olympique Colmar (11)
161.	ES Wolfisheim (13)	0–2	FC Oberhausbergen (11)
162.	CS St Etienne Wolxheim (12)	2–0	FC Entzheim (10)
163.	SR Zellwiller (12)	2–2 (3–4 p)	FC Eschau (9)
164.	SS Zillisheim (9)	1–2	FC Riedisheim (8)
165.	US Zimmersheim-Eschentzwiller (11)	1–3	FC Baldersheim (9)

=== Champagne-Ardenne ===
These matches were played on 9, 10, 17 and 24 June 2018 in Champagne-Ardenne. Tiers shown reflect the 2017–18 season.

First round results: Champagne-Ardenne
Tie no	Home team (tier)	Score	Away team (tier)
1.	Nord Ardennes (9)	1–3 (a.e.t.)	US Fumay-Charnois (9)
2.	ES Auvillers/Signy-le-Petit (11)	1–7	FC Haybes (10)
3.	US Revin (9)	9–0	SC Vivarois (9)
4.	US Balan (10)	5–1	ES Vouziers (10)
5.	US Ayvelles (10)	1–5	AS Charleville Franco-Turque (9)
6.	Cheveuges-St Aignan CO (10)	1–2 (a.e.t.)	FC Blagny-Carignan (9)
7.	AS Sault-lès-Rethel (11)	0–2	ES Saulces-Monclin (10)
8.	AS Lumes (10)	0–3	ES Charleville-Mézières (9)
9.	JS Remilly-Aillicourt (10)	2–0	Floing FC (10)
10.	AS Messincourt (11)	0–3 (Note: Tie won by forfeit.)	USC Nouvion-sur-Meuse (9)
11.	Amicale Bagneux-Clesles (10)	4–1	AS Portugaise Nogent-sur-Seine (9)
12.	AS Marigny-St Martin (9)	2–2 (4–3 p)	Alliance Sud-Ouest Football Aubois (9)
13.	JS Vaudoise (9)	3–0	AS Tertre (9)
14.	Stade Briennois (9)	0–2	CS Trois Vallées (9)
15.	FC Vallant/Les Grès (9)	2–4	FC Traînel (10)
16.	Renouveau Ramerupt (9)	4–3 (a.e.t.)	FC Malgache (9)
17.	SC de la Suippe (10)	2–2 (6–7 p)	AS St Brice-Courcelles (10)
18.	FC Sillery (9)	3–0	US St Martin-d'Ablois (10)
19.	Bétheny FC (10)	3–0	AS Gueux (11)
20.	US Esternay (10)	0–1	US Oiry (10)
21.	Reims Murigny Franco Portugais (9)	4–2	AS Mourmelon-Livry-Bouy (10)
22.	ES Fagnières (9)	3–1 (Note: Tie switched at the request of both clubs.)	US Chausséenne (11)
23.	AS Ste Menehould (12)	0–3	AS Courtisols ESTAN (9)
24.	AE Franco Turc Reims (11)	2–7	SC Dormans (10)
25.	ACF Charmont-Vanault (12)	2–8	US Thiéblemont-Farémont (11)
26.	AS Bignicourt-sur-Marne (12)	0–3	US Châtelraould-Les Rivières-Henruel (10)
27.	AS Cheminon (10)	0–7	AS Marolles (10)
28.	ES Connantre-Corroy (11)	2–0	Foyer Compertrix (10)
29.	ES Gault-Soigny (12)	6–4 (a.e.t.)	US Dizy (10)
30.	Arden 51 FC (12)	1–2	Espérance Rémoise (9)
31.	USS Sermaize (10)	3–0	Olympic Suippas (11)
32.	US Wassy-Brousseval (11)	1–4	CS Villiers-en-Lieu (10)
33.	US Rouvres Canton d'Auberive (12)	0–4	US Biesles (10)
34.	US Bourbonnaise (10)	3–5	US Fayl-Billot/Hortes (9)
35.	Foyer Bayard (11)	3–2	DS Eurville-Bienville (9)
36.	ES Corgirnon-Chaudenay (10)	3–2	CS Chalindrey (10)
37.	CS Doulaincourt-Saucourt (11)	2–3 (a.e.t.)	FC Joinville-Vecqueville (9)
38.	US Arc-en-Barrois (11)	1–0 (a.e.t.)	ES Prauthoy-Vaux (9)
39.	CA Rolampontais (9)	1–2 (a.e.t.)	SR Neuilly-l'Évêque (9)
40.	US Bricon-Orges (11)	3–4 (a.e.t.)	FC Laville-aux-Bois (10)
41.	CS Maranville-Rennepont (9)	5–3	ASPTT Chaumont (9)
42.	AS Poissons-Noncourt (10)	4–2	Espérance St Dizier (9)

=== Lorraine ===
These matches were played on 2, 3, 8, 9, 10, 17 and 23 June and 12, 15 and 19 August 2018 in Lorraine. Tiers shown reflect the 2017–18 season.

First round results: Lorraine
Tie no	Home team (tier)	Score	Away team (tier)
1.	FC Des Ballons (10)	8–2	FC Vierge (13)
2.	FC Haute Moselotte (10)	6–3	AS Ramonchamp (12)
3.	SR Pouxeux-Jarménil (11)	3–2	AS St Ruppeen (13)
4.	FC Saulxures-sur-Moselotte-Thiéfosse (12)	0–2	US Arches-Archettes-Raon (10)
5.	FC Pagny-sur-Meuse (12)	1–4	US Val de Saône (11)
6.	FC Amerey Xertigny (11)	2–5 (a.e.t.)	FC Ajolais (12)
7.	AS St Nabord (10)	– (Note: The match was abandoned with the scoreline 4–1 when the coach of AS Plombières removed his team from the field. AS Plombières were subsequently penalised, AS St Nabord qualify.)	AS Plombières (11)
8.	FC Dommartin-lès-Remiremont (12)	0–3 (Note: Tie won by forfeit.)	AS Cheniménil (12)
9.	US Lamarche (11)	1–0	FR Ménil Rozerotte (12)
10.	FC St Amé-Julienrupt (12)	4–3	SM Bruyères (12)
11.	AS Gérardmer (9)	6–0	US La Bourgonce (12)
12.	FC Remiremont (10)	0–1	AS Padoux (11)
13.	FC Le Tholy (12)	3–1	FC Uriménil-Uzemain (13)
14.	ASC Montiers-sur-Saulx (12)	5–2	SC Contrisson (11)
15.	AS Stenay-Mouzay (10)	4–0	FC Chauvency (12)
16.	AS Baudonvilliers (11)	2–4 (a.e.t.)	FC Haironville (10)
17.	AS Darney (12)	1–5	AS Dommartin La Vraine (12)
18.	FC Revigny (11)	4–1	SC Commercy (10)
19.	FC Éloyes (8)	2–1	FC Hadol-Dounoux (10)
20.	FC Dugny (10)	3–0 (Note: Tie switched at the request of both clubs.)	SC Les Islettes (12)
21.	FC Charmois-l'Orgueilleux (12)	3–3 (5–4 p)	AS Gironcourt (10)
22.	ES Haute Meurthe (11)	5–2	FJEP Magnières (11)
23.	ES Michelloise (12)	3–9	FC Granges-sur-Vologne (11)
24.	AS Val d'Ornain (11)	2–5	Brillon AC (11)
25.	IFC Lerrain-Esley (12)	2–4	Dogneville FC (11)
26.	AS Colombey (12)	1–3	Bulgnéville Contrex Vittel FC (9)
27.	Saulcy FC (11)	3–0	Espérance Gerbéviller (11)
28.	FC Fains-Véel (10)	6–1	FC Pierrefitte-sur-Aire (11)
29.	SM Taintrux (9)	– (Note: The match was abandoned with scoreline 6–0. US Senones were subsequently penalised, SM Taintrux qualify)	US Senones (11)
30.	FC Ste Marguerite (9)	3–3 (4–2 p)	Entente Bru-Jeanménil SBH (11)
31.	ASC Kellermann (9)	void (Note: AS Rehaincourt were replaced by ES Aviere Darnieulles, for currently unknown reasons. See tie 161.)	AS Rehaincourt (12)
32.	Lorraine Vaucoulers (11)	0–1	FC Neufchâteau-Liffol (9)
33.	ASL Coussey-Greux (11)	0–2	GS Vézelise (12)
34.	Gars de l'Ornois Gondrecourt (12)	0–4	Entente Centre Ornain (9)
35.	AS Tréveray (11)	3–1	ES Maizey-Lacroix (10)
36.	FC Othe-Montmédy (11)	1–3	USB Longwy (10)
37.	US Mirecourt-Hymont (11)	6–0	Entente Sud 54 (11)
38.	SM Etival (12)	4–3	Amicale de Chanteheux (11)
39.	CS Réhon (12)	1–2	ES Longuyon (10)
40.	US Thierville (10)	5–0	US Jarny (10)
41.	CS Charmes (10)	0–1 (a.e.t.)	AC Blainville-Damelevières (8)
42.	AS Mouterhouse (9)	13–0	Saint-Louis 2017 (13)
43.	Association St Laurent Mangiennes (11)	0–2	AS Dieue-Sommedieue (10)
44.	Entente Réhon Villers Morfontaine (11)	3–7 (a.e.t.)	USL Mont St Martin (9)
45.	ES Cons-Ugny Val de Chiers (12)	5–0	ES Vallée de l'Othain St Jean/Marville (11)
46.	US Lexy (10)	0–3	JS Audunoise (9)
47.	ES Tilly-Ambly Villers-Bouquemont (11)	4–3	FC St Mihiel (8)
48.	AC Rigny-la-Salle (11)	0–2	FC Toul (10)
49.	Entente Schorbach Hottviller Volmunster 13 (11)	1–3	FC Beausoleil Sarreguemines (12)
50.	ES Badonviller-Celles (12)	3–0	FC Héming (12)
51.	US Goetzenbruck-Meisenthal (10)	1–4	Achen-Etting-Schmittviller (9)
52.	FC Lemberg-St Louis (10)	5–7 (a.e.t.)	US Roth (11)
53.	ES Avricourt Moussey (11)	2–1	FC Hommert (10)
54.	CS Loudrefing (13)	0–10	Montagnarde Walscheid (10)
55.	FC Dannelbourg (10)	3–2	Olympique Mittelbronn 04 (11)
56.	AS Henridorff (10)	3–4	AS Brouviller (11)
57.	SC Baccarat (10)	7–1	GAS Croismare (11)
58.	US Soucht (9)	3–0	FC Istanbul Sarreguemines (10)
59.	FC Troisfontaines (11)	1–4	AS Laneuveville Marainviller (10)
60.	ES Ormersviller-Epping (11)	1–2	ES Gros Réderching-Bettviller (10)
61.	AS Montbronn (10)	5–2	ES Wies Woelf (11)
62.	FC Rohrbach-Bining (10)	2–0	FC Sarralbe (11)
63.	ASC Dolving (12)	1–7	AS Réding (9)
64.	FC Insming (12)	4–2	EF Turque Sarrebourg (8)
65.	Sportive Lorquinoise (10)	0–1	AS Le Val-de-Guéblange (10)
66.	AS MJC Blâmont (10)	3–4	AS Bettborn Hellering (10)
67.	AS Bliesbruck (10)	4–1	US Bousbach (12)
68.	AS Kalhausen (10)	3–0	AS Neunkirch (11)
69.	ES Charmois Damelevières (12)	0–6	ES Lunéville Sixte (9)
70.	FC Montois (12)	1–2 (a.e.t.)	AS Rehainviller Hériménil (11)
71.	FC Écrouves (10)	2–2 (3–2 p)	AS Ludres (8)
72.	FC Pont St Vincent (12)	2–0	AS Velaine-en-Haye (13)
73.	ES Vermois (13)	1–2	NG Touloise (11)
74.	US Rosières-aux-Salines (12)	1–8	ASC Saulxures-lès-Nancy (10)
75.	Toul JCA (10)	4–0	AS Varangéville-St Nicolas (10)
76.	AS Dommartin-lès-Toul (11)	0–1	AS Haut-du-Lièvre Nancy (9)
77.	AJS René II (12)	0–4	Stade Flévillois (10)
78.	AS Gondreville (9)	3–2	ASPTT Nancy (13)
79.	AF Einville (12)	0–3	FC Houdemont (10)
80.	ES Laneuveville (10)	1–0 (a.e.t.)	MJC Pichon (10)
81.	AF Laxou Sapinière (9)	3–1	Maxéville FC (10)
82.	SG Marienau (10)	void (Note: SG Marienau forfeited their place in the championship, and are therefore not eligible to compete. They were replaced by AS Anzeling Edling. See tie 159.)	FC Metzing (11)
83.	US Rouhling (10)	8–0	CS Wittring (11)
84.	ENJ Val-de-Seille (10)	1–3	FC St Max-Essey (9)
85.	SC Malzéville (11)	4–1	Omnisports Frouard Pompey (12)
86.	US Batilly (11)	2–7	US Etain-Buzy (9)
87.	FC Valleroy-Moinville (10)	1–6	Entente Vigneulles-Hannonville-Fresne (8)
88.	FC Seichamps (11)	1–3	AS Lay-St Christophe/Bouxieres-aux-Dames (10)
89.	FTM Liverdun (11)	1–4	ES Custines-Malleloy (9)
90.	Olympique Marbache Belleville Dieulouard (10)	0–7	AS Grand Couronne (9)
91.	US St Jean-Rohrbach (12)	3–5	FC Dieuze (10)
92.	US Holving (11)	3–1	SO Ippling (9)
93.	ASC Œting (12)	2–6	US Alsting-Zinzing (10)
94.	AS Lixing-lès-Rouhling (12)	2–4	US Spicheren (10)
95.	FR Faulx (12)	3–1	SC Vic-sur-Seille (10)
96.	US Etzling (12)	1–2	AS Kerbach (11)
97.	CS Diebling (10)	4–3 (a.e.t.)	USF Farébersviller (8)
98.	CS Stiring-Wendel (10)	3–1	FC Bruch Forbach (12)
99.	FC Francaltroff (11)	0–3	FC Folschviller (8)
100.	FC Farschviller (11)	2–10	FC Hochwald (10)
101.	JS Bischwald (11)	0–6	AS Hellimer (9)
102.	US Morsbach (10)	1–6	FC Freyming (9)
103.	Alliance Cocheren-Rosbruck (11)	4–6 (a.e.t.)	ES Macheren Petit-Eversviller (9)
104.	AC Hutchet St Avold (12)	1–7	ES Petite-Rosselle (9)
105.	AS Grostenquin Bérig Bistroff (10)	0–8	SSEP Hombourg-Haut (10)
106.	ES Lixing-Laning (10)	3–0	AS Teting-sur-Nied (13)
107.	FC Vahl-Ebersing (12)	0–5	US Valmont (11)
108.	FC Dieulouard (13)	2–5	FC Pont-à-Mousson (11)
109.	FC Loisy (13)	1–7	AJSE Montauville (11)
110.	EF Delme-Solgne (10)	3–1 (a.e.t.)	FC Verny-Louvigny-Cuvry (10)
111.	ASJA St Avold (11)	0–2	FC Longeville-lès-St Avold (10)
112.	FC Carling (10)	2–3	JS Wenheck (8)
113.	FC L'Hôpital (12)	7–0	AS Falck (12)
114.	GS Thiaucourt (11)	3–0	JS Ancy-sur-Moselle (12)
115.	ES Créhange-Faulquemont (10)	4–1	JS Ars-Laquenexy (10)
116.	Flétrange SA (12)	3–0	FC Coume (10)
117.	JS Rémering-lès-Hargarten (11)	4–0	JS Distroff (12)
118.	FC Vœlfling (11)	0–5	CEP Kédange (10)
119.	ES Crusnes (11)	0–2	CS Godbrange (9)
120.	AS Mercy-le-Bas (11)	0–5	Entente Bure-Boulange (10)
121.	AS Peltre (12)	3–6	JA Rémilly (9)
122.	ES Garche (12)	1–5	ESR Rémeling (10)
123.	US Filstroff (11)	2–1	RC Thionville (13)
124.	CO Bouzonville (11)	3–0	US Vigy (11)
125.	JS Rettel-Hunting (11)	0–3	US Cattenom (10)
126.	ES Courcelles-sur-Nied (10)	0–1	MJC Volmerange-lès-Boulay (9)
127.	AF Os Conquistadors Metz (11)	0–3	FC Novéant (9)
128.	Excelsior Cuvry (10)	12–0	Fleury FC (12)
129.	US Aumetz (12)	3–6	ES Rosselange Vitry (10)
130.	CS Volmerange-les-Mines (11)	1–0	US Illange (11)
131.	US Guentrange (10)	2–0	US Kœnigsmacker (8)
132.	AS Sœtrich (11)	3–0	AS Entrange (10)
133.	FC Hettange-Grande (9)	4–2	ASC Basse-Ham (10)
134.	FC Angevillers (12)	0–9	FC Hayange (9)
135.	AS Tucquegnieux-Trieux (11)	2–0	JL Knutange (11)
136.	JS Manom (11)	0–3	AS Algrange (10)
137.	US Yutz (10)	4–2	US Marspich (11)
138.	AS Konacker (12)	1–2	ES Richemont (11)
139.	SC Terville (11)	3–2	TS Bertrange (10)
140.	US Conflans (10)	2–4	US Briey (9)
141.	AS Neufchef (12)	2–5	RS Serémange-Erzange (10)
142.	AS Florange-Ebange (10)	2–0	US Froidcul (9)
143.	FC Guénange (10)	10–2	US Fontoy (10)
144.	Olympique Moutiers (11)	1–8	ES Jœuf (8)
145.	AJ Aubouésienne (10)	2–3 (a.e.t.)	AS Clouange (8)
146.	FC Mondelange (10)	3–2	FC Pierrevillers (10)
147.	ASPF Ste Marie-aux-Chênes (12)	0–4	ES Marange-Silvange (10)
148.	AS Talange (11)	1–3 (a.e.t.)	ES Maizières (11)
149.	RS La Maxe (10)	0–4	FC Devant-les-Ponts Metz (8)
150.	ES Haut Plateau Messin (12)	0–6	AS Les Côteaux (11)
151.	AS Gravelotte (13)	2–1	FC Woippy (10)
152.	SC Marly (9)	void (Note: CO Metz Bellecroix forfeited their place in the championship, and are therefore not eligible to compete. They were replaced by AS Hauconcourt. See tie 160.)	CO Metz Bellecroix (10)
153.	SC Moulins-lès-Metz (11)	2–2 (2–4 p)	US Ban-St Martin (10)
154.	AS Scy-Chazelles (11)	2–0	FC Lorry-Plappeville (13)
155.	US Châtel-St Germain (9)	1–2	ES Woippy (9)
156.	AS St Julien-lès-Metz (9)	3–1	Génération Grenat 95 (13)
157.	JS Renaissance St Christophe Metz (13)	void (Note: JS Renaissance St Christophe Metz were replaced by AS Betting-Guenviller, for currently unknown reasons. See tie 162.)	JSO Ennery (12)
158.	US ACLI Metz (13)	– (Note: The match was abandoned. US ACLI Metz were subsequently penalised, ESAP Metz qualify)	ESAP Metz (10)
159.	FC Metzing (11)	3–1	AS Anzeling Edling (12)
160.	SC Marly (9)	4–3	AS Hauconcourt (12)
161.	ASC Kellermann (9)	3–1	ES Aviere Darnieulles (11)
162.	JSO Ennery (12)	0–1	AS Betting-Guenviller (11)

== Second round ==
These matches were played on 12, 15, 18, 19, 26 and 29 August 2018 (with two replays played 9 and 12 September).

Second round results: Grand Est
Tie no	Home team (tier)	Score	Away team (tier)
1.	ES Charleville-Mézières (9)	0–0 (2–0 p)	AS Tournes/Renwez/Les Mazures/Arreux/Montcornet (7)
2.	US Bazeilles (7)	0–3	Le Theux FC (8)
3.	CA Villers-Semeuse (7)	0–1	USA Le Chesne (7)
4.	Amicale Bagneux-Clesles (10)	0–0 (3–4 p)	Bar-sur-Aube FC (7)
5.	FC Traînel (9)	3–0 (Note: Tie won by forfeit.)	AFM Romilly (Note: AFM Romilly were not engaged in a senior division for this season, due to not having a home ground.)
6.	JS Vaudoise (9)	1–2	JS St Julien FC (7)
7.	AS Marigny-St Martin (10)	1–7	Foyer Barsequanais (7)
8.	AS Taissy (7)	4–1	US Fismes (8)
9.	CS Agéen (8)	0–0 (4–5 p)	FC Christo (8)
10.	ES Witry-les-Reims (8)	0–2	US Avize-Grauves (7)
11.	RC Sézanne (7)	7–2	Nord Champagne FC (7)
12.	FC Sillery (10)	0–3	AS Cernay-Berru-Lavannes (7)
13.	ASPTT Châlons (7)	8–1 (Note: Tie switched with the agreement of both clubs.)	Espérance Rémoise (8)
14.	US Oiry (9)	3–0	SC Tinqueux (7)
15.	US Châtelraould-Les Rivières-Henruel (10)	0–6	Châlons FCO (7)
16.	SC Marnaval (7)	7–2	FC Prez Bourmont (8)
17.	SL Ornel (7)	2–6	Chaumont FC (7)
18.	Stade Chevillonnais (7)	4–0	FC Sts-Geosmois (7)
19.	US Éclaron (7)	8–0	US Montier-en-Der (8)
20.	AS Neuville-lès-This (8)	0–4	FC Bogny (7)
21.	Saulcy FC (9)	1–1 (2–4 p)	SR Saint-Dié (8)
22.	Achen-Etting-Schmittviller (8)	4–4 (3–0 p)	AS Kalhausen (9)
23.	US Alsting-Zinzing (9)	1–2	US Soucht (8)
24.	US Arches-Archettes-Raon (10)	4–2 (a.e.t.)	FC Le Tholy (11)
25.	ES Avricourt Moussey (10)	1–11	AS Bettborn Hellering (10)
26.	SC Baccarat (9)	7–2	FC Dieuze (9)
27.	ES Badonviller-Celles (11)	2–1	SM Taintrux (9)
28.	CO Bouzonville (12)	2–4	ES Woippy (8)
29.	Bulgnéville Contrex Vittel FC (8)	5–3 (a.e.t.)	FC Toul (9)
30.	US Cattenom (10)	0–0 (3–4 p)	Entente Bure-Boulange (9)
31.	AS Cheniménil (11)	1–2 (a.e.t.)	AS Nomexy-Vincey (8)
32.	AS Clouange (8)	3–0	RS Serémange-Erzange (9)
33.	ES Créhange-Faulquemont (9)	1–2	SR Creutzwald 03 (8)
34.	ES Custines-Malleloy (9)	3–1	ES Laneuveville (9)
35.	Excelsior Cuvry (9)	1–3	AF Laxou Sapinière (8)
36.	FC Dannelbourg (9)	7–0	FC Insming (11)
37.	EF Delme-Solgne (9)	4–1	SC Malzéville (9)
38.	CS Diebling (9)	4–1 (a.e.t.)	JS Wenheck (8)
39.	AS Dieue-Sommedieue (8)	5–1	GS Thiaucourt (10)
40.	Dogneville FC (10)	3–1	FC Haute Moselotte (10)
41.	FC Écrouves (9)	1–2	AS Gondreville (8)
42.	FR Faulx (11)	0–7	AS Villey-St Étienne (8)
43.	US Filstroff (10)	0–4	FC Hayange (8)
44.	Flétrange SA (10)	0–6	AS Morhange (8)
45.	AS Florange-Ebange (9)	0–7	ES Metz (8)
46.	FC Freyming (8)	3–2	FC Metzing (9)
47.	AS Grand Couronne (8)	4–0	FC Houdemont (9)
48.	FC Granges-sur-Vologne (10)	2–1	FC Ajolais (11)
49.	AS Gravelotte (11)	3–2	FC Dugny (9)
50.	CS Godbrange (8)	6–1	SC Terville (10)
51.	US Guentrange (10)	2–1	ESAP Metz (8)
52.	FC Haironville (10)	1–3 (a.e.t.)	SF Verdun Belleville (8)
53.	AS Hellimer (8)	1–0	FC Longeville-lès-St Avold (9)
54.	FC Hettange-Grande (8)	1–5	ES Rosselange Vitry (9)
55.	FC Hochwald (9)	3–3 (3–0 p)	SO Merlebach (8)
56.	US Holving (9)	1–2	AS Montbronn (9)
57.	AS Kerbach (11)	1–4	AS Betting-Guenviller (10)
58.	US Lamarche (10)	3–2	FC Charmois-l'Orgueilleux (11)
59.	AS Laneuveville Marainviller (9)	5–1 (a.e.t.)	ES Haute Meurthe (10)
60.	AS Lay-St Christophe/Bouxieres-aux-Dames (8)	2–2 (2–4 p) (Note: First match abandoned with the score 1–1 when a supporter of FC Novéant entered the field carrying a knife. The league committee ordered the game to be replayed.)	FC Novéant (8)
61.	AS Le Val-de-Guéblange (9)	1–2 (a.e.t.)	ES Macheren Petit-Eversviller (8)
62.	AS Les Côteaux (9)	5–3 (a.e.t.) (Note: In the original match, with the scoreline 1–2, the referee allowed a substituted player from ES Jœuf to re-enter the field of play. The final scoreline was 2–3. The league committee ruled that the match should be replayed due to this being a refereeing error.)	ES Jœuf (8)
63.	ES Gros Réderching-Bettviller (9)	0–4	CS Stiring-Wendel (10)
64.	ES Lixing-Laning (10)	0–3	SSEP Hombourg-Haut (8)
65.	ES Longuyon (8)	1–3	AS Tucquegnieux-Trieux (10)
66.	USB Longwy (9)	3–0	AS Sœtrich (9)
67.	ES Lunéville Sixte (8)	1–2	Stade Flévillois (9)
68.	ES Maizières (10)	2–5	US Ban-St Martin (9)
69.	ES Marange-Silvange (10)	2–4	US Etain-Buzy (8)
70.	SC Marly (8)	4–1	AS Scy-Chazelles (11)
71.	US Mirecourt-Hymont (10)	8–0	FC Pont St Vincent (11)
72.	FC Mondelange (9)	0–3	JS Audunoise (9)
73.	USL Mont St Martin (8)	2–4 (a.e.t.)	ES Gandrange (8)
74.	AS Haut-du-Lièvre Nancy (8)	3–1	Toul JCA (8)
75.	FC Neufchâteau-Liffol (9)	3–1	NG Touloise (10)
76.	FC L'Hôpital (11)	1–4	AS Bliesbruck (9)
77.	AS Padoux (10)	2–2 (5–6 p)	ASC Kellermann (8)
78.	FC Pont-à-Mousson (9)	3–0	Entente Vigneulles-Hannonville-Fresne (8)
79.	SR Pouxeux-Jarménil (10)	1–5	AS Girancourt-Dommartin-Chaumousey (8)
80.	AS Réding (8)	8–0	AS Brouviller (9)
81.	AS Rehainviller Hériménil (10)	6–5 (a.e.t.)	SM Etival (10)
82.	ESR Rémeling (9)	2–3	AS Portugais St Francois Thionville (8)
83.	FC Guénange (9)	1–3	JS Rémering-lès-Hargarten (9)
84.	JA Rémilly (8)	0–3	AS St Julien-lès-Metz (8)
85.	FC Revigny (10)	3–1	ASC Montiers-sur-Saulx (11)
86.	ES Richemont (9)	0–3	FC Devant-les-Ponts Metz (8)
87.	US Roth (10)	3–0	AS Mouterhouse (9)
88.	US Rouhling (10)	0–0 (2–3 p)	ES Petite-Rosselle (10)
89.	FC St Amé-Julienrupt (11)	0–10	AS Gérardmer (8)
90.	FC Des Ballons (9)	5–2	FC Éloyes (8)
91.	FC St Max-Essey (8)	4–0	AJSE Montauville (10)
92.	FC Beausoleil Sarreguemines (12)	3–0	FC Rohrbach-Bining (9)
93.	ASC Saulxures-lès-Nancy (9)	3–2	AC Blainville-Damelevières (8)
94.	Entente Sorcy Void-Vacon (8)	7–0	Brillon AC (10)
95.	US Spicheren (9)	4–1	US Behren-lès-Forbach (8)
96.	AS Stenay-Mouzay (10)	4–1 (a.e.t.)	ES Cons-Ugny Val de Chiers (10)
97.	US Thierville (9)	2–1	US Briey (8)
98.	ES Tilly-Ambly Villers-Bouquemont (9)	2–3	Entente Centre Ornain (8)
99.	AS Tréveray (9)	5–2	FC Fains-Véel (9)
100.	US Val de Saône (11)	0–4	AS St Nabord (9)
101.	US Valmont (9)	2–1	FC Folschviller (8)
102.	MJC Volmerange-lès-Boulay (8)	2–1	CEP Kédange (8)
103.	CS Volmerange-les-Mines (9)	3–0	AS Algrange (8)
104.	Montagnarde Walscheid (9)	1–2	FC Ste Marguerite (8)
105.	US Yutz (9)	1–3	FC Hagondange (8)
106.	FC Alteckendorf (10)	1–6	CS Fegersheim (8)
107.	FC Altenstadt/Wissembourg (12)	0–6	US Wittersheim (10)
108.	AS Altkirch (8)	2–1 (a.e.t.)	FC Merxheim (9)
109.	AS Aspach-le-Haut (10)	1–3	'FC Village Neuf (11)
110.	AS Portugais Barembach-Bruche (12)	0–2	AS Mutzig (8)
111.	SR Bergheim (10)	0–8	Racing HW 96 (8)
112.	FC Colmar Unifié (11)	4–2	US Sundhouse (11)
113.	RC Dannemarie (10)	0–2	AS Lutterbach (9)
114.	FC Dauendorf (12)	0–6	US Turcs Bischwiller (8)
115.	AS Dingsheim-Griesheim (12)	1–6	CA Plobsheim (12)
116.	ASL Duntzenheim (10)	0–1	FC Lingolsheim (10)
117.	FC Durrenbach (10)	1–2	AS Platania Gundershoffen (8)
118.	SC Ebersheim (10)	2–3	US Dachstein (11)
119.	FC Eckbolsheim (8)	3–2 (a.e.t.)	AP Joie et Santé Strasbourg (9)
120.	UJ Epfig (10)	0–1 (a.e.t.)	AS Ribeauvillé (8)
121.	Entente Laubach/Forstheim (12)	0–5	AS Hunspach (8)
122.	AS Gerstheim (10)	0–3	FC Ostheim-Houssen (8)
123.	FC Grendelbruch (12)	2–1	ASB Schirmeck-La Broque (10)
124.	US Gumbrechtshoffen (11)	8–1	FC Niederschaeffolsheim (11)
125.	AS Hausgauen (11)	2–1	AS Red Star Mulhouse (8)
126.	ASCCO Helfrantzkirch (11)	0–2	FC Baldersheim (9)
127.	FC Hirtzbach (8)	6–6 (3–4 p)	FC Habsheim (8)
128.	AS Hochfelden (8)	1–0	AS Mundolsheim (9)
129.	US Imbsheim (12)	9–0	FC Monswiller (12)
130.	US Innenheim (11)	0–4 (a.e.t.)	ALFC Duttlenheim (8)
131.	FR Jebsheim-Muntzenheim (11)	1–5	FC Niederhergheim (9)
132.	FC Kindwiller (11)	2–3	AS Uhrwiller (10)
133.	AS St Barthelemy Leutenheim (12)	1–1 (4–2 p)	FC Geudertheim (9)
134.	US Bouxwiller (11)	4–2 (a.e.t.)	FC Lixhausen (13)
135.	AS Mertzen (9)	1–0	FC Seppois (9)
136.	FC Meyenheim (9)	6–2 (a.e.t.)	AS Rixheim (9)
137.	US Mommenheim (11)	3–1	AS Wingen-sur-Moder (11)
138.	Montreux Sports (8)	2–4	FC Riedisheim (8)
139.	Entente Mothern Munchhausen (10)	6–1	FA Val de Moder (10)
140.	Alliance Muespach-Folgensbourg (12)	2–1	US Hésingue (9)
141.	Real Mulhouse CF (8)	3–2	FC Wintzfelden-Osenbach (9)
142.	AS Natzwiller (11)	4–2	AS Sermersheim (9)
143.	FC Niederlauterbach (11)	5–1	AS Kurtzenhouse (12)
144.	US Oberbruck Dolleren (10)	0–2	FC Bantzenheim (8)
145.	FC Oberhausbergen (10)	0–2	ASI Avenir (8)
146.	FC Oberhoffen (10)	1–3	Entente Kaltenhouse/Marienthal (9)
147.	AS Ober-Niederentzen (10)	0–3	Mouloudia Mulhouse (8)
148.	FC Oberroedern/Aschbach (9)	0–5	SR Rountzenheim-Auenheim (10)
149.	US Oberschaeffolsheim (8)	7–5 (a.e.t.)	AS Educative Cité de l'Ill (8)
150.	ES Offendorf (13)	0–14	FC Drusenheim (8)
151.	AS Ohlungen (8)	1–1 (4–5 p)	US Schleithal (8)
152.	SC Ottmarsheim (8)	4–2	FC Morschwiller-le-Bas (9)
153.	FC Petit-Landau (11)	0–8	FC Bartenheim (8)
154.	AS Pfulgriesheim (11)	4–1	FC Mackwiller (11)
155.	FC Phalsbourg (9)	3–0	SC Red Star Strasbourg (10)
156.	FC Quatzenheim (12)	3–4 (a.e.t.)	FC Ernolsheim-lès-Saverne (12)
157.	FC Rhinau (9)	1–2 (a.e.t.)	AS Pfaffenheim (9)
158.	FCRS Richwiller (10)	2–4	FC Fessenheim (8)
159.	FC Riedseltz/Rott (10)	1–2	AS Betschdorf (8)
160.	FCI Riquewihr (10)	0–3	USL Duppigheim (9)
161.	SC Rittershoffen (11)	0–4	AS Hoerdt (8)
162.	FC Roderen (10)	1–2	SR Kaysersberg (9)
163.	FC Schaffhouse-sur-Zorn (12)	0–2	AS Ingwiller/Menchhoffen (9)
164.	US Scherwiller (9)	12–0	AS Westhouse (10)
165.	AS Espagnols Schiltigheim (12)	1–0	Strasbourg Université Club (11)
166.	FC Ecrivains-Schiltigheim-Bischheim (10)	1–4	US Ittenheim (8)
167.	AS Schœnau (11)	1–3	AS Munster (8)
168.	FC Scheibenhard (10)	0–1	FC Herrlisheim (8)
169.	AS Portugais Sélestat (9)	3–0	FC Bennwihr (8)
170.	AS St Pierre-Bois/Triembah-au-Val (10)	2–0	US Nordhouse (8)
171.	FC Steinbrunn-le-Bas (10)	3–5 (a.e.t.)	US Vallée de la Thur (8)
172.	ES Stotzheim (11)	0–3 (a.e.t.)	FC Ingersheim (8)
173.	FCO Strasbourg Koenigshoffen 06 (8)	4–2	ES Pfettisheim (9)
174.	AJF Hautepierre Strasbourg (10) (Note: AJF Hautepierre Strasbourg is a rebrand of CS Hautepierre Strasbourg who were first round winners.)	3–2 (a.e.t.)	AS Butten-Diemeringen (9)
175.	AS Musau Strasbourg (11)	1–5	FC Saverne (8)
176.	FC Tagsdorf (10)	0–3	AS Niffer (10)
177.	FC Uffheim (8)	3–6	AS Raedersheim (8)
178.	CS Waldhambach (10)	0–3	International Meinau Académie (10) (Note: International Meinau Académie is a successor club to AS Électricité Strasbourg who were first round winners.)
179.	AS Weinbourg (12)	1–0	FC Eschau (9)
180.	FC Weitbruch (10)	2–0	AS Reichstett (9)
181.	FC Wettolsheim (12)	4–5	FC Krautergersheim (10)
182.	SR Widensolen (11)	3–0 (Note: US Colmar penalised for currently unknown reasons. SR Widensolen qualify. Original scoreline 1–0.)	US Colmar (8)
183.	FC Schweighouse-sur-Moder (8)	4–3	FC Wingersheim (9)
184.	AS Wintzenheim (13)	– (Note: Match abandoned by the referee after 63 minutes, with the scoreline 1–5, due to the referee feeling threatened by the home team players. AS Wintzenheim penalised. FC Rossfeld qualify.)	FC Rossfeld (8)
185.	ASTR Wittenheim (11)	2–4	FC Pfastatt 1926 (8)
186.	CS St Etienne Wolxheim (12)	0–8	AS Bischoffsheim (8)
187.	FC Blagny-Carignan (9)	0–2	AS Mouzon (8)
188.	US Balan (9)	1–0	AS Bourg-Rocroi (8)
189.	FC Haybes (9)	0–2	FC Allobais Doncherois (8)
190.	JS Remilly-Aillicourt (10)	1–0	US Revin (9)
191.	ES Saulces-Monclin (10)	3–4	US Fumay-Charnois (8)
192.	USC Nouvion-sur-Meuse (9)	0–2	AS Charleville Franco-Turque (9)
193.	QV Douzy (8)	1–3	Liart-Signy-l'Abbaye FC (8)
194.	Olympique Torcy-Sedan (8)	6–1	FC Porcien (8)
195.	CS Trois Vallées (9)	1–3	US Maizières-Chartres (8)
196.	Étoile Chapelaine (9)	4–2 (a.e.t.)	Rosières Omnisports (8)
197.	US Vendeuvre (8)	0–4	Renouveau Ramerupt (8)
198.	ES Municipaux Troyes (8)	2–1 (a.e.t.)	ESC Melda (8)
199.	Bétheny FC (10)	4–6 (a.e.t.)	FC Turcs Épernay (8)
200.	Reims Murigny Franco Portugais (9)	2–3	FCF La Neuvillette-Jamin (8)
201.	Vitry FC (8)	1–2	US Couvrot (10)
202.	AS Courtisols ESTAN (8)	1–4	USS Sermaize (10)
203.	Argonne FC (8)	3–0	FC St Martin-sur-le-Pré/La Veuve/Recy (9)
204.	AS Marolles (10)	1–0	SC Dormans (10)
205.	ES Fagnières (9)	3–0	AS St Brice-Courcelles (10)
206.	ES Gault-Soigny (11)	6–1	ES Connantre-Corroy (10)
207.	US Thiéblemont-Farémont (11)	2–1	FC Côte des Blancs (8)
208.	US Biesles (10)	4–1	Foyer Bayard (11)
209.	CO Langres (10)	1–4	ES Andelot-Rimaucourt-Bourdons (8)
210.	US Fayl-Billot/Hortes (9)	2–0 (a.e.t.)	ES Corgirnon-Chaudenay (11)
211.	FC Laville-aux-Bois (10)	0–1 (a.e.t.)	CS Maranville-Rennepont (9)
212.	SR Neuilly-l'Évêque (9)	4–1	FC Villiers-en-Lieu (10) (Note: FC Villiers-en-Lieu is a rebrand of CS Villiers-en-Lieu who were first round winners.)
213.	US Arc-en-Barrois (10)	0–4	AS Sarrey-Montigny (8)
214.	FC Joinville-Vecqueville (9)	0–2	AS Poissons-Noncourt (9)
215.	AS Burnhaupt-le-Bas (9)	2–3	FC Rosenau (10)
216.	AS Heiligenstein (11)	0–3	US Baldenheim (8)

== Third round ==
These matches were played on 14, 15 and 16 September 2018.

Third round results: Grand Est
Tie no	Home team (tier)	Score	Away team (tier)
1.	FC Niederlauterbach (11)	1–9	US Sarre-Union (5)
2.	US Soucht (8)	1–2	US Forbach (6)
3.	AS Platania Gundershoffen (8)	0–3	AS Ingwiller/Menchhoffen (9)
4.	FC Soleil Bischheim (6)	1–1 (4–2 p)	ASPV Strasbourg (5)
5.	AS Weinbourg (12)	0–5	SS Weyersheim (7)
6.	USA Le Chesne (7)	2–0	AS Taissy (7)
7.	AS Altkirch (8)	0–1	FC Saint-Louis Neuweg (5)
8.	AS Pfaffenheim (9)	1–5	AS St Pierre-Bois/Triembah-au-Val (10)
9.	SR Saint-Dié (8)	0–2	GS Haroué-Benney (7)
10.	ASL Kœtzingue (7)	3–2	FC Bartenheim (8)
11.	FC Riedisheim (8)	0–3	FC Burnhaupt-le-Haut (7)
12.	FC Sierentz (7)	4–6	CS Mulhouse Bourtzwiller (8)
13.	FC Ostheim-Houssen (8)	1–2	AS Ribeauvillé (8)
14.	AS St Julien-lès-Metz (8)	8–0	ASC Saulxures-lès-Nancy (9)
15.	US Ittenheim (8)	0–3	FC Eckbolsheim (8)
16.	AS Saulnes Longlaville (7)	0–3	Thionville FC (6)
17.	AS Tucquegnieux-Trieux (10)	0–4	AS Portugais St Francois Thionville (8)
18.	CS Godbrange (8)	2–3 (a.e.t.)	AS Clouange (8)
19.	JS Audunoise (9)	3–1	US Guentrange (10)
20.	CS Homécourt (7)	7–1	US Etain-Buzy (8)
21.	USB Longwy (9)	1–3	ES Villerupt-Thil (7)
22.	FC Bassin Piennois (7)	1–0	CSO Amnéville (5)
23.	CS Volmerange-les-Mines (9)	0–1 (a.e.t.)	AS Les Côteaux (9)
24.	FC Hayange (8)	0–0 (6–5 p)	Entente Bure-Boulange (9)
25.	FC Yutz (7)	3–2	ES Macheren Petit-Eversviller (8)
26.	ES Woippy (8)	7–0	MJC Volmerange-lès-Boulay (8)
27.	US Valmont (9)	0–3	ES Fameck (7)
28.	ES Rosselange Vitry (9)	10–0	JS Rémering-lès-Hargarten (11)
29.	FC Freyming (8)	1–4	Étoile Naborienne St Avold (6)
30.	SR Creutzwald 03 (8)	4–2	CS Diebling (9)
31.	CS Stiring-Wendel (10)	3–1	CS Veymerange (7)
32.	FC Hagondange (8)	1–0	FC Trémery (6)
33.	Achen-Etting-Schmittviller (8)	1–4 (a.e.t.)	Sarreguemines FC (5)
34.	UL Plantières Metz (7)	1–2	AS Morhange (8)
35.	AS Betting-Guenviller (10)	1–0	US Roth (10)
36.	AS Bliesbruck (9)	2–0	US Spicheren (9)
37.	ES Petite-Rosselle (10)	0–4	UL Rombas (7)
38.	FC Hochwald (9)	0–4	US Nousseviller (7)
39.	SSEP Hombourg-Haut (8)	4–0	AS Hellimer (8)
40.	AS Montbronn (9)	2–1	RS Magny (7)
41.	Entente Sorcy Void-Vacon (8)	0–2	RS Amanvillers (7)
42.	AS Gravelotte (11)	1–2	Entente Centre Ornain (8)
43.	AS Montigny-lès-Metz (8)	6–2	AS Tréveray (9)
44.	FC Revigny (10)	1–6	US Pagny-sur-Moselle (6)
45.	USAG Uckange (7)	4–2 (a.e.t.)	SF Verdun Belleville (8)
46.	AS Stenay-Mouzay (10)	0–7	FC Devant-les-Ponts Metz (8)
47.	US Thierville (9)	0–2 (a.e.t.)	FC Pont-à-Mousson (9)
48.	ES Gandrange (8)	3–1 (a.e.t.)	APM Metz (6)
49.	AS Dieue-Sommedieue (8)	0–1	Bar-le-Duc FC (6)
50.	ASC Kellermann (8)	3–0	FC Dannelbourg (9)
51.	AF Laxou Sapinière (8)	1–0 (a.e.t.)	SC Baccarat (9)
52.	GS Vézelise (11)	0–0 (2–4 p)	ES Badonviller-Celles (11)
53.	Stade Flévillois (9)	0–4	US Raon-l'Étape (5)
54.	ES Heillecourt (7)	5–2	FC Dombasle-sur-Meurthe (7)
55.	FC Pulnoy (7)	3–1	AS Bettborn Hellering (10)
56.	AS Grand Couronne (8)	0–4	FC Sarrebourg (6)
57.	AS Laneuveville Marainviller (9)	0–1	AS Haut-du-Lièvre Nancy (8)
58.	FC Ste Marguerite (8)	2–4	AS Réding (8)
59.	AS Rehainviller Hériménil (10)	2–6 (a.e.t.)	FC St Max-Essey (8)
60.	AS Villey-St Étienne (8)	0–1	SC Marly (8)
61.	AS Gondreville (8)	2–0	ES Metz (8)
62.	FC Lunéville (6)	0–0 (1–2 p)	COS Villers (7)
63.	ES Custines-Malleloy (9)	0–2	Jarville JF (6)
64.	EF Delme-Solgne (9)	0–4	GS Neuves-Maisons (7)
65.	US Arches-Archettes-Raon (10)	0–1 (a.e.t.)	US Mirecourt-Hymont (10)
66.	Dogneville FC (10)	0–3	ES Golbey (7)
67.	AS Gérardmer (8)	5–2	AS St Nabord (9)
68.	US Lamarche (10)	0–3	AS Vagney (7)
69.	FC Granges-sur-Vologne (10)	0–4	Bulgnéville Contrex Vittel FC (8)
70.	AS Nomexy-Vincey (8)	1–0	AS Girancourt-Dommartin-Chaumousey (8)
71.	FC Des Ballons (9)	1–3	ES Thaon (5)
72.	FC Neufchâteau-Liffol (9)	0–1	US Vandœuvre (6)
73.	US Wittersheim (10)	1–5	AS Hochfelden (8)
74.	ASI Avenir (8)	1–6	FC Obermodern (6)
75.	US Baldenheim (8)	0–1	AS Portugais Sélestat (9)
76.	FC Baldersheim (9)	0–2	AS Huningue (7)
77.	AS Berrwiller-Hartsmannswiller (7)	1–2	FC Rossfeld (8)
78.	AS Bischoffsheim (8)	3–1	US Vallée de la Thur (8)
79.	US Bouxwiller (11)	1–6	FC Soultz-sous-Forêts/Kutzenhausen (7)
80.	FC Colmar Unifié (11)	1–4	SC Ottmarsheim (8)
81.	US Dachstein (11)	0–2	AS Menora Strasbourg (7)
82.	SC Drulingen (7)	1–4	US Oberlauterbach (6)
83.	FC Drusenheim (8)	4–0	FC Phalsbourg (9)
84.	ALFC Duttlenheim (8)	4–3	FC Niederhergheim (9)
85.	FC Ernolsheim-lès-Saverne (12)	0–3	US Reipertswiller (6)
86.	CS Fegersheim (8)	1–7	FA Illkirch Graffenstaden (6)
87.	FC Fessenheim (8)	3–2	US Scherwiller (9)
88.	FC Grendelbruch (12)	0–1	FC Ingersheim (8)
89.	US Gumbrechtshoffen (11)	0–1	AS Betschdorf (8)
90.	AS Hausgauen (11)	0–6	AS Blotzheim (7)
91.	FC Herrlisheim (8)	2–1	FC Kronenbourg Strasbourg (6)
92.	FC Illhaeusern (7)	1–2 (a.e.t.)	AS Mutzig (8)
93.	US Imbsheim (12)	1–0	AS Hunspach (8)
94.	Entente Kaltenhouse/Marienthal (9)	0–2	FC Weitbruch (10)
95.	SR Kaysersberg (9)	0–1	FC Still 1930 (7)
96.	FC Krautergersheim (10)	0–5	AGIIR Florival (7)
97.	AS St Barthelemy Leutenheim (12)	0–13	FC St Etienne Seltz (7)
98.	FC Lingolsheim (10)	0–0 (0–3 p)	US Oberschaeffolsheim (8)
99.	AS Mertzen (9)	1–3	AS Illzach Modenheim (6)
100.	FC Mulhouse (5)	4–1	FC Hégenheim (6)
101.	Alliance Muespach-Folgensbourg (12)	2–1	FC Bantzenheim (8)
102.	Mouloudia Mulhouse (8)	3–6	FC Habsheim (8)
103.	Real Mulhouse CF (8)	2–1 (a.e.t.)	FC Meyenheim (9)
104.	AS Natzwiller (11)	0–8	ASC Biesheim (5)
105.	AS Niffer (10)	1–6	FC Hagenthal-Wentzwiller (6)
106.	FCSR Obernai (7)	2–3	AS Munster (8)
107.	FC Pfastatt 1926 (8)	1–3 (a.e.t.)	FC Kembs Réunis (6)
108.	CA Plobsheim (12)	0–4	US Turcs Bischwiller (8)
109.	FC Rosenau (10)	1–0	AS Raedersheim (8)
110.	SR Rountzenheim-Auenheim (10)	1–5	FCE Schirrhein (6)
111.	FC Saverne (8)	0–0 (2–3 p)	US Schleithal (8)
112.	AS Espagnols Schiltigheim (12)	0–5	USL Duppigheim (9)
113.	AS Elsau Portugais Strasbourg (7)	2–2 (5–6 p)	FCO Strasbourg Koenigshoffen 06 (8)
114.	AJF Hautepierre Strasbourg (10)	3–1	AS Pfulgriesheim (11)
115.	International Meinau Académie (10)	2–3 (Note: Match abandoned after 55 minutes with the scoreline 2–3, when the visiting goalkeeper was hit on the head by a stone thrown by the crowd. International Meinau Académie subsequently penalised. AS Hoerdt qualify.)	AS Hoerdt (8)
116.	Olympique Strasbourg (7)	3–1	ASL Robertsau (7)
117.	AS Sundhoffen (7)	1–2	FC Geispolsheim 01 (6)
118.	AS Uhrwiller (10)	1–0	Entente Mothern Munchhausen (10)
119.	FC Village Neuf (11)	4–0	AS Lutterbach (9)
120.	SR Widensolen (11)	2–4	Racing HW 96 (8)
121.	US Wittenheim (8)	0–3	ES Molsheim-Ernolsheim (7)
122.	US Balan (9)	0–0 (4–2 p)	Rethel SF (6)
123.	FC Allobais Doncherois (8)	1–3	Liart-Signy-l'Abbaye FC (8)
124.	AS Asfeld (6)	3–2	ASPTT Châlons (7)
125.	ES Fagnières (9)	1–0	ES Charleville-Mézières (9)
126.	US Mommenheim (11)	1–2	FC Schweighouse-sur-Moder (8)
127.	FCF La Neuvillette-Jamin (8)	0–1	FC Bogny (7)
128.	AS Mouzon (8)	0–2 (Note: Olympique Charleville Neufmanil Aiglemont penalised for fielding too many transferred players, in contravention of the rules. AS Mouzon qualify.)	Olympique Charleville Neufmanil Aiglemont (6)
129.	Le Theux FC (8)	2–1	FC Christo (8)
130.	AS Charleville Franco-Turque (9)	1–2	Olympique Torcy-Sedan (8)
131.	JS Remilly-Aillicourt (10)	3–1	US Fumay-Charnois (8)
132.	US Maizières-Chartres (8)	0–3	FC St Mesmin (6)
133.	Bar-sur-Aube FC (7)	3–1	US Oiry (9)
134.	Châlons FCO (7)	3–1	FC Nogentais (6)
135.	AS Marolles (10)	1–2	ES Gault-Soigny (11)
136.	Foyer Barsequanais (7)	3–5 (a.e.t.)	Aube Sud Vanne Pays D'Othe (6)
137.	JS St Julien FC (7)	1–1 (8–9 p)	Argonne FC (8)
138.	Étoile Chapelaine (9)	2–7	US Avize-Grauves (7)
139.	FC Turcs Épernay (8)	0–7	RC Épernay Champagne (5)
140.	ES Municipaux Troyes (8)	2–0	FC Traînel (9)
141.	RCS La Chapelle (6)	2–0	US Thiéblemont-Farémont (11)
142.	US Couvrot (10)	0–3	AS Sarrey-Montigny (8)
143.	CS Maranville-Rennepont (9)	0–4	MJEP Cormontreuil (6)
144.	ES Andelot-Rimaucourt-Bourdons (8)	0–5	RC Sézanne (7)
145.	Renouveau Ramerupt (8)	1–6	USI Blaise (6)
146.	US Éclaron (7)	1–5 (a.e.t.)	FCA Troyes (5)
147.	SR Neuilly-l'Évêque (9)	2–0	US Biesles (10)
148.	USS Sermaize (10)	1–0	US Fayl-Billot/Hortes (9)
149.	EF Reims Sainte-Anne Châtillons (6)	4–0	SC Marnaval (7)
150.	Chaumont FC (7)	1–2 (a.e.t.)	Stade Chevillonnais (7)
151.	SA Sézanne (6)	5–0	AS Poissons-Noncourt (9)
152.	AS Cernay-Berru-Lavannes (7)	0–3	AS Prix-lès-Mézières (6)
153.	FC Beausoleil Sarreguemines (12)	2–3 (a.e.t.)	CA Boulay (6)
154.	US Ban-St Martin (9)	0–2	RC Champigneulles (6)
155.	AS Erstein (6)	4–1	Stadium Racing Colmar (7)
156.	CS&O Blénod-Pont-à-Mousson (7)	2–1	FC Novéant (8)

== Fourth round ==
These matches were played on 29 and 30 September 2018.

Fourth round results: Grand Est
Tie no	Home team (tier)	Score	Away team (tier)
1.	AS St Pierre-Bois/Triembah-au-Val (10)	0–3	AS Portugais Sélestat (9)
2.	AS Erstein (6)	0–2 (a.e.t.)	SC Schiltigheim (4)
3.	FC Ingersheim (8)	0–5	ASC Biesheim (5)
4.	AJF Hautepierre Strasbourg (10)	2–3	FC Rossfeld (8)
5.	Racing HW 96 (8)	3–1	AS Ribeauvillé (8)
6.	USL Duppigheim (9)	0–0 (4–2 p)	AS Menora Strasbourg (7)
7.	AS Munster (8)	3–1	FC Geispolsheim 01 (6)
8.	CS Mulhouse Bourtzwiller (8)	1–2 (a.e.t.)	AGIIR Florival (7)
9.	FC Schweighouse-sur-Moder (8)	1–3 (a.e.t.)	FA Illkirch Graffenstaden (6)
10.	US Schleithal (8)	0–4	FC Drusenheim (8)
11.	FC Weitbruch (10)	0–0 (5–4 p)	US Oberlauterbach (6)
12.	AS Hoerdt (8)	4–2	FC Herrlisheim (8)
13.	FCE Schirrhein (6)	2–1	SS Weyersheim (7)
14.	US Turcs Bischwiller (8)	2–5	FC Soultz-sous-Forêts/Kutzenhausen (7)
15.	AS Uhrwiller (10)	0–2	AS Betschdorf (8)
16.	FC St Etienne Seltz (7)	1–3	FCSR Haguenau (4)
17.	FC Rosenau (10)	0–2 (a.e.t.)	FC Habsheim (8)
18.	Real Mulhouse CF (8)	2–1	FC Mulhouse (5)
19.	FC Fessenheim (8)	2–1 (a.e.t.)	ASL Kœtzingue (7)
20.	AS Blotzheim (7)	1–1 (4–3 p)	AS Huningue (7)
21.	Alliance Muespach-Folgensbourg (12)	0–1	FC Burnhaupt-le-Haut (7)
22.	FC Village Neuf (11)	2–0	AS Illzach Modenheim (6)
23.	SC Ottmarsheim (8)	0–4	FC Hagenthal-Wentzwiller (6)
24.	FC Kembs Réunis (6)	1–8	FC Saint-Louis Neuweg (5)
25.	US Oberschaeffolsheim (8)	0–3	FC Obermodern (6)
26.	AS Ingwiller/Menchhoffen (9)	0–2	FC Soleil Bischheim (6)
27.	FC Eckbolsheim (8)	0–2	FC Still 1930 (7)
28.	AS Hochfelden (8)	0–2	AS Bischoffsheim (8)
29.	FCO Strasbourg Koenigshoffen 06 (8)	0–3	Olympique Strasbourg (7)
30.	US Reipertswiller (6)	1–1 (4–1 p)	US Sarre-Union (5)
31.	ES Molsheim-Ernolsheim (7)	2–0	AS Mutzig (8)
32.	US Imbsheim (12)	0–2	ALFC Duttlenheim (8)
33.	JS Audunoise (9)	0–3	Thionville FC (6)
34.	FC Hagondange (8)	1–1 (5–3 p)	FC Hayange (8)
35.	AS Clouange (8)	0–3	ES Gandrange (8)
36.	AS Portugais St Francois Thionville (8)	2–3	Étoile Naborienne St Avold (6)
37.	AS Les Côteaux (9)	0–1	ES Villerupt-Thil (7)
38.	USAG Uckange (7)	0–1	FC Bassin Piennois (7)
39.	FC Yutz (7)	0–3	Sarreguemines FC (5)
40.	ES Rosselange Vitry (9)	1–2 (a.e.t.)	CA Boulay (6)
41.	RS Amanvillers (7)	0–4	CS Homécourt (7)
42.	CS Stiring-Wendel (10)	3–0	AS Bliesbruck (9)
43.	FC Devant-les-Ponts Metz (8)	0–3	SSEP Hombourg-Haut (8)
44.	SR Creutzwald 03 (8)	5–2	AS Montbronn (9)
45.	UL Rombas (7)	0–5	ES Thaon (5)
46.	ES Fameck (7)	3–0	ES Woippy (8)
47.	AS Betting-Guenviller (10)	0–1	US Nousseviller (7)
48.	RC Champigneulles (6)	2–3 (a.e.t.)	US Forbach (6)
49.	Entente Centre Ornain (8)	3–0	AS Gondreville (8)
50.	FC Pont-à-Mousson (9)	2–3	AF Laxou Sapinière (8)
51.	AS Morhange (8)	0–1	ES Heillecourt (7)
52.	AS St Julien-lès-Metz (8)	2–0	CS&O Blénod-Pont-à-Mousson (7)
53.	AS Montigny-lès-Metz (8)	0–1 (a.e.t.)	US Pagny-sur-Moselle (6)
54.	GS Haroué-Benney (7)	0–1	Jarville JF (6)
55.	US Vandœuvre (6)	1–3	US Raon-l'Étape (5)
56.	SC Marly (8)	2–2 (3–4 p)	GS Neuves-Maisons (7)
57.	FC St Max-Essey (8)	1–3	Bar-le-Duc FC (6)
58.	ASC Kellermann (8)	4–0	FC Pulnoy (7)
59.	Bulgnéville Contrex Vittel FC (8)	3–0	AS Nomexy-Vincey (8)
60.	COS Villers (7)	5–1	AS Gérardmer (8)
61.	FC Sarrebourg (6)	0–1	AS Vagney (7)
62.	AS Réding (8)	2–3	AS Haut-du-Lièvre Nancy (8)
63.	US Mirecourt-Hymont (10)	0–2	SAS Épinal (4)
64.	ES Badonviller-Celles (11)	0–5	ES Golbey (7)
65.	Argonne FC (8)	5–1	US Balan (9)
66.	Olympique Torcy-Sedan (8)	0–3	AS Prix-lès-Mézières (6)
67.	Liart-Signy-l'Abbaye FC (8)	2–1	FC Bogny (7)
68.	MJEP Cormontreuil (6)	0–1	EF Reims Sainte-Anne Châtillons (6)
69.	Châlons FCO (7)	4–2 (Note: Châlons FCO penalised for fielding a suspended player. AS Asfeld qualify.)	AS Asfeld (6)
70.	JS Remilly-Aillicourt (10)	1–2	Le Theux FC (8)
71.	ES Fagnières (9)	2–4	USA Le Chesne (7)
72.	AS Mouzon (8)	0–7	CS Sedan Ardennes (4)
73.	FCA Troyes (5)	2–1	FC St Mesmin (6)
74.	SR Neuilly-l'Évêque (9)	3–0	Bar-sur-Aube FC (7)
75.	US Avize-Grauves (7)	3–0	ES Municipaux Troyes (8)
76.	RC Sézanne (7)	0–5	RCS La Chapelle (6)
77.	AS Sarrey-Montigny (8)	1–2	SA Sézanne (6)
78.	USI Blaise (6)	1–0	Stade Chevillonnais (7)
79.	ES Gault-Soigny (11)	3–2 (Note: Tie switched with agreement of both teams.)	USS Sermaize (10)
80.	RC Épernay Champagne (5)	4–1	Aube Sud Vanne Pays D'Othe (6)

== Fifth round ==
These matches were played on 29 and 30 September 2018.

Fifth round results: Grand Est
Tie no	Home team (tier)	Score	Away team (tier)
1.	AS St Pierre-Bois/Triembah-au-Val (10)	0–3	AS Portugais Sélestat (9)
2.	AS Erstein (6)	0–2 (a.e.t.)	SC Schiltigheim (4)
3.	FC Ingersheim (8)	0–5	ASC Biesheim (5)
4.	AJF Hautepierre Strasbourg (10)	2–3	FC Rossfeld (8)
5.	Racing HW 96 (8)	3–1	AS Ribeauvillé (8)
6.	USL Duppigheim (9)	0–0 (4–2 p)	AS Menora Strasbourg (7)
7.	AS Munster (8)	3–1	FC Geispolsheim 01 (6)
8.	CS Mulhouse Bourtzwiller (8)	1–2 (a.e.t.)	AGIIR Florival (7)
9.	FC Schweighouse-sur-Moder (8)	1–3 (a.e.t.)	FA Illkirch Graffenstaden (6)
10.	US Schleithal (8)	0–4	FC Drusenheim (8)
11.	FC Weitbruch (10)	0–0 (5–4 p)	US Oberlauterbach (6)
12.	AS Hoerdt (8)	4–2	FC Herrlisheim (8)
13.	FCE Schirrhein (6)	2–1	SS Weyersheim (7)
14.	US Turcs Bischwiller (8)	2–5	FC Soultz-sous-Forêts/Kutzenhausen (7)
15.	AS Uhrwiller (10)	0–2	AS Betschdorf (8)
16.	FC St Etienne Seltz (7)	1–3	FCSR Haguenau (4)
17.	FC Rosenau (10)	0–2 (a.e.t.)	FC Habsheim (8)
18.	Real Mulhouse CF (8)	2–1	FC Mulhouse (5)
19.	FC Fessenheim (8)	2–1 (a.e.t.)	ASL Kœtzingue (7)
20.	AS Blotzheim (7)	1–1 (4–3 p)	AS Huningue (7)
21.	Alliance Muespach-Folgensbourg (12)	0–1	FC Burnhaupt-le-Haut (7)
22.	FC Village Neuf (11)	2–0	AS Illzach Modenheim (6)
23.	SC Ottmarsheim (8)	0–4	FC Hagenthal-Wentzwiller (6)
24.	FC Kembs Réunis (6)	1–8	FC Saint-Louis Neuweg (5)
25.	US Oberschaeffolsheim (8)	0–3	FC Obermodern (6)
26.	AS Ingwiller/Menchhoffen (9)	0–2	FC Soleil Bischheim (6)
27.	FC Eckbolsheim (8)	0–2	FC Still 1930 (7)
28.	AS Hochfelden (8)	0–2	AS Bischoffsheim (8)
29.	FCO Strasbourg Koenigshoffen 06 (8)	0–3	Olympique Strasbourg (7)
30.	US Reipertswiller (6)	1–1 (4–1 p)	US Sarre-Union (5)
31.	ES Molsheim-Ernolsheim (7)	2–0	AS Mutzig (8)
32.	US Imbsheim (12)	0–2	ALFC Duttlenheim (8)
33.	JS Audunoise (9)	0–3	Thionville FC (6)
34.	FC Hagondange (8)	1–1 (5–3 p)	FC Hayange (8)
35.	AS Clouange (8)	0–3	ES Gandrange (8)
36.	AS Portugais St Francois Thionville (8)	2–3	Étoile Naborienne St Avold (6)
37.	AS Les Côteaux (9)	0–1	ES Villerupt-Thil (7)
38.	USAG Uckange (7)	0–1	FC Bassin Piennois (7)
39.	FC Yutz (7)	0–3	Sarreguemines FC (5)
40.	ES Rosselange Vitry (9)	1–2 (a.e.t.)	CA Boulay (6)
41.	RS Amanvillers (7)	0–4	CS Homécourt (7)
42.	CS Stiring-Wendel (10)	3–0	AS Bliesbruck (9)
43.	FC Devant-les-Ponts Metz (8)	0–3	SSEP Hombourg-Haut (8)
44.	SR Creutzwald 03 (8)	5–2	AS Montbronn (9)
45.	UL Rombas (7)	0–5	ES Thaon (5)
46.	ES Fameck (7)	3–0	ES Woippy (8)
47.	AS Betting-Guenviller (10)	0–1	US Nousseviller (7)
48.	RC Champigneulles (6)	2–3 (a.e.t.)	US Forbach (6)
49.	Entente Centre Ornain (8)	3–0	AS Gondreville (8)
50.	FC Pont-à-Mousson (9)	2–3	AF Laxou Sapinière (8)
51.	AS Morhange (8)	0–1	ES Heillecourt (7)
52.	AS St Julien-lès-Metz (8)	2–0	CS&O Blénod-Pont-à-Mousson (7)
53.	AS Montigny-lès-Metz (8)	0–1 (a.e.t.)	US Pagny-sur-Moselle (6)
54.	GS Haroué-Benney (7)	0–1	Jarville JF (6)
55.	US Vandœuvre (6)	1–3	US Raon-l'Étape (5)
56.	SC Marly (8)	2–2 (3–4 p)	GS Neuves-Maisons (7)
57.	FC St Max-Essey (8)	1–3	Bar-le-Duc FC (6)
58.	ASC Kellermann (8)	4–0	FC Pulnoy (7)
59.	Bulgnéville Contrex Vittel FC (8)	3–0	AS Nomexy-Vincey (8)
60.	COS Villers (7)	5–1	AS Gérardmer (8)
61.	FC Sarrebourg (6)	0–1	AS Vagney (7)
62.	AS Réding (8)	2–3	AS Haut-du-Lièvre Nancy (8)
63.	US Mirecourt-Hymont (10)	0–2	SAS Épinal (4)
64.	ES Badonviller-Celles (11)	0–5	ES Golbey (7)
65.	Argonne FC (8)	5–1	US Balan (9)
66.	Olympique Torcy-Sedan (8)	0–3	AS Prix-lès-Mézières (6)
67.	Liart-Signy-l'Abbaye FC (8)	2–1	FC Bogny (7)
68.	MJEP Cormontreuil (6)	0–1	EF Reims Sainte-Anne Châtillons (6)
69.	Châlons FCO (7)	4–2 (Note: Châlons FCO penalised for fielding a suspended player. AS Asfeld qualify.)	AS Asfeld (6)
70.	JS Remilly-Aillicourt (10)	1–2	Le Theux FC (8)
71.	ES Fagnières (9)	2–4	USA Le Chesne (7)
72.	AS Mouzon (8)	0–7	CS Sedan Ardennes (4)
73.	FCA Troyes (5)	2–1	FC St Mesmin (6)
74.	SR Neuilly-l'Évêque (9)	3–0	Bar-sur-Aube FC (7)
75.	US Avize-Grauves (7)	3–0	ES Municipaux Troyes (8)
76.	RC Sézanne (7)	0–5	RCS La Chapelle (6)
77.	AS Sarrey-Montigny (8)	1–2	SA Sézanne (6)
78.	USI Blaise (6)	1–0	Stade Chevillonnais (7)
79.	ES Gault-Soigny (11)	3–2 (Note: Tie switched with agreement of both teams.)	USS Sermaize (10)
80.	RC Épernay Champagne (5)	4–1	Aube Sud Vanne Pays D'Othe (6)

== Sixth round ==
These matches were played on 27 and 28 October 2018.

Sixth round results: Grand Est
Tie no	Home team (tier)	Score	Away team (tier)
1.	FC Fessenheim (8)	1–2	ES Thaon (5)
2.	FC Soleil Bischheim (6)	1–2	ASC Biesheim (5)
3.	AS Munster (8)	0–5	SC Schiltigheim (4)
4.	FC Obermodern (6)	1–3	FCSR Haguenau (4)
5.	FC Drusenheim (8)	1–3 (a.e.t.)	FC Saint-Louis Neuweg (5)
6.	AS Betschdorf (8)	0–1	FC Rossfeld (8)
7.	AS Vagney (7)	2–3	FA Illkirch Graffenstaden (6)
8.	Olympique Strasbourg (7)	4–0	Racing HW 96 (8)
9.	FC Weitbruch (10)	0–4	US Raon-l'Étape (5)
10.	FC Still 1930 (7)	0–2	US Reipertswiller (6)
11.	Sarreguemines FC (5)	4–0	AS Asfeld (6)
12.	AF Laxou Sapinière (8)	0–1	Étoile Naborienne St Avold (6)
13.	FCA Troyes (5)	2–0	SA Sézanne (6)
14.	AS Prix-lès-Mézières (6)	3–1 (a.e.t.)	ES Villerupt-Thil (7)
15.	ASC Kellermann (8)	1–2 (a.e.t.)	RCS La Chapelle (6)
16.	USA Le Chesne (7)	0–2	RC Épernay Champagne (5)
17.	COS Villers (7)	0–1 (a.e.t.)	SAS Épinal (4)
18.	Le Theux FC (8)	2–6	ES Heillecourt (7)
19.	CA Boulay (6)	3–4 (a.e.t.)	US Avize-Grauves (7)
20.	Jarville JF (6)	0–2	CS Sedan Ardennes (4)
