= Jacky Duguépéroux =

French footballer and manager (born 1948)

Personal information
- Date of birth: 20 January 1948 (age 78)
- Position: Defender

Senior career*
Years	Team	Apps	(Gls)
1965–1973	Valenciennes	152	(1)
1973–1979	RC Strasbourg	198	(5)
1979–1988	ASPV Strasbourg		

Managerial career
- 1988–1991: ASPV Strasbourg
- 1995–1998: RC Strasbourg
- 2004–2006: RC Strasbourg
- 2006–2007: Espérance
- 2014–2016: RC Strasbourg
- 2023–: AS Mutzig
- * Club domestic league appearances and goals

Jacky Duguépéroux (born 20 January 1948) is a French football manager and former player. He has been manager of RC Strasbourg, for whom he also played, on three occasions. Between his final two terms, he managed Tunisian side Espérance. On 9 April 2023, Duguépéroux took over as manager of AS Mutzig.

== Honours ==
=== As a player ===
Strasbourg

- Division 1 1978–79

=== As a coach ===
Strasbourg

- Coupe de la Ligue: 1996–97, 2004–05
- Coupe de France: 2000–01; runner-up: 1994–95
