= AS Mutzig =

- Full name: Association Still-Mutzig
- Founded: 1930 (as FC Mutzig)
- Ground: Stade Roger Leissner, Mutzig
- President: Chantal Bayard
- Manager: Jacky Duguépéroux
- League: Régional 3 Grand Est; Group N
- Website: https://web.archive.org/web/20120728094745/http://www.as-mutzig.fr:80/
Home colours	Away colours

Association Still-Mutzig, commonly known as AS Mutzig, is an association football club based in the commune of Mutzig, in the Bas-Rhin department of eastern France. Founded in 1930 as FC Mutzig, the club currently plays in the Excellence de Bas-Rhin at the seventh level of French football, although for 13 years between 1963 and 1976 they competed in the third tier. AS Mutzig plays at the Stade Roger Leissner, named in honour of the club president during their accession to the Championnat de France amateur in the early 1960s.

Arsène Wenger, the former manager of English Premier League club Arsenal, started his senior playing career at Mutzig after being signed by then manager Max Hild, who went on to manage RC Strasbourg. Other former Mutzig coaches to have managed professional clubs include Paco Mateo and Paul Frantz.

== Honours ==
- Championnat de France Amateur Group East: 1964–65
- Division 3 Groupe East: 1973–74
- Division d'Honneur Alsace: 1962–63
- Coupe d'Alsace: 1971
