= RCS La Chapelle =

French football club

Reunion des Cheminots et des Sportifs de la Chapelle Saint-Luc is a French association football team founded in 1942. They are based in La Chapelle-Saint-Luc, Champagne-Ardenne, France and are currently playing in the Championnat de France Amateurs 2 Group B, the fifth tier in the French football league system. They play at the Stade SNCF in La Chapelle-Saint-Luc, which has a capacity of 1,000.

La Chapelle Saint-Luc reached the 8th round of the 2009–10 Coupe de France, losing 4–1 to FC Mulhouse.

== Season-by-Season ==
Year	Level	Division	Position
1997–1998	6	Division d'Honneur Champagne Ardenne	2nd
1998–1999	6	Division d'Honneur Champagne Ardenne	1st
1999–2000	5	Championnat de France Amateurs 2 Group B	2nd
2000–2001	4	Championnat de France Amateurs Group A	12th
2001–2002	4	Championnat de France Amateurs Group A	15th
2002–2003	4	Championnat de France Amateurs Group B	13th
2003–2004	4	Championnat de France Amateurs Group B	17th
2004–2005	5	Championnat de France Amateurs 2 Group B	11th
2005–2006	5	Championnat de France Amateurs 2 Group C	11th
2006–2007	5	Championnat de France Amateurs 2 Group B	
