= 2021–22 Coupe de France preliminary rounds, Grand Est =

The 2021–22 Coupe de France preliminary rounds, Grant Est was the qualifying competition to decide which teams from the leagues of the Grand Est region of France took part in the main competition from the seventh round.

A total of nineteen teams qualified from the Grand Est preliminary rounds. In 2020–21, CS Sedan Ardennes progressed furthest in the main competition, reaching the round of 16 before losing to Angers.

== Draws and fixtures ==
On 30 July 2021, the league announced that a total of 943 teams had entered from the region. 820 teams enter at the first round stage, with clubs from all district level leagues and Régionale 3 included. Additionally, seven Régionale 2 teams, drawn at random, were included at this stage to take account of the late promotion of Sedan. The remaining 70 Régionale 2 teams were exempted to the second round. The second round draw was published on 31 August 2021. The third round draw was published on 14 September 2021. The fourth round draw was published on 23 September 2021. The fifth round draw was published on 6 October 2021. The sixth round draw was made on 20 October 2021.

=== First round ===
These matches were played on 28 and 29 August 2021, with one postponed to 2 September 2021.

First round results: Grand Est
Tie no	Home team (tier)	Score	Away team (tier)
1.	AS Sault-lès-Rethel (11)	1–1 (4–5 p)	US Fumay-Charnois (8)
2.	Joyeuse de Warcq (11)	1–0	FC Launois (12)
3.	FC Haybes (9)	4–2	Liart-Signy-l'Abbaye FC (8)
4.	ES Auvillers/Signy-le-Petit (11)	1–0	AS Monthermé-Thilay (9)
5.	ES Novion-Porcien (11)	0–13	Le Theux FC (7)
6.	EM Charleville-Mézières (9)	0–0 (6–7 p)	ES Saulces-Monclin (9)
7.	US Deville (11)	0–3 (Note: Tie won by means of forfeit.)	AS Bourg-Rocroi (8)
8.	FC Maubert-Fontaine (11)	0–2	FC Porcien (8)
9.	US Revin (8)	3–1	Nord Ardennes (8)
10.	Cheveuges-Saint-Aignan CO (10)	3–1	US Balan (9)
11.	US Margut (11)	1–6	SOS Buzancy (11)
12.	US Les Ayvelles (10)	1–2	AS Val de l'Aisne (8)
13.	AS Mouzon (10)	0–6	Olympique Charleville Neufmanil Aiglemont (8)
14.	ASR Raucourt (11)	1–0 (Note: ASR Raucourt penalised. JS Vrignoise qualified. Reason unknown.)	JS Vrignoise (11)
15.	AS Lumes (10)	2–1	FC Allobais Doncherois (9)
16.	US Bazeilles (8)	5–0	QV Douzy (8)
17.	AS Pouru-aux-Bois (11)	0–0 (5–6 p)	Floing FC (9)
18.	AS Monthois (11)	0–2	USC Nouvion-sur-Meuse (9)
19.	AS Ville-sur-Lumes (10)	2–6	ES Charleville-Mézières (8)
20.	AS Taissy (8)	5–0 (Note: Tie reversed from original draw.)	AS Gueux (10)
21.	ES Witry-les-Reims (8)	1–0	US Fismes Ardre et Vesle (8)
22.	AS Saint-Brice-Courcelles (10)	2–4	ES Pierry Moussy (11)
23.	Reims Jeunes Consacré (11)	1–1 (4–3 p)	Espérance Rémoise (9)
24.	Groupe Portugais de Reims (12)	4–1	SC Dormans (10)
25.	SL Pontfaverger (10)	2–0	US Machault (10)
26.	ES Muizonnaise (11)	0–3	CS Agéen (8)
27.	Reims Galaxy (12)	0–3	FC Tinqueux Champagne (9)
28.	US Dizy (10)	2–4	Reims Murigny Franco Portugais (9)
29.	Olympique FC (11)	0–3	US Oiry (8)
30.	FC Vallée de la Suippe (10)	0–2	FCF La Neuvillette-Jamin (8)
31.	Entente Rémoise (11)	0–3	Bétheny FC (8)
32.	US Esternay (10)	6–0	AS Courtisols ESTAN (8)
33.	FC Saint-Martin-sur-le-Pré/La Veuve/Recy (10)	2–0	Saint-Memmie FC (10)
34.	FC Conflans-sur-Seine (10)	0–2	FC Morgendois (10)
35.	FC Haute Borne (11)	0–0 (4–5 p)	Foyer Compertrix (9)
36.	FC Faux-Vésigneul-Pogny (9)	1–0	Entente Somsois Margerie Saint-Utin (9)
37.	Olympic Suippas (11)	1–6	Vitry FC (8)
38.	US Couvrot (10)	0–4	ES Fagnières (8)
39.	USS Sermaize (10)	6–0	AS Cheminon (10)
40.	US Thiéblemont-Farémont (10)	2–0 (Note: US Thiéblemont-Farémont penalised. ES Gault-Soigny qualified. Reason unknown.)	ES Gault-Soigny (9)
41.	Entente Étoges-Vert (11)	6–2	Argonne FC (9)
42.	Renouveau Ramerupt (8)	0–2	AS Tertre (9)
43.	Torvilliers AC (9)	1–2	FC Nord Est Aubois (8)
44.	JS Saint-Julien FC (8)	1–0	ESC Melda (8)
45.	SC Savières (10)	2–5	Alliance Sud-Ouest Football Aubois (8)
46.	AS Inter Asiatique Troyes (9)	3–1	Romilly Champagne FC (10)
47.	AS Chartreux (9)	6–3	Étoile Lusigny (9)
48.	ES Celles-Essoyes (10)	2–1	US Vendeuvre (8)
49.	ES Municipaux Troyes (8)	2–0	AS Portugaise Nogent-sur-Seine (9)
50.	FC Trainel (9)	2–4	Étoile Chapelaine (8)
51.	US Dienville (8)	2–2 (3–0 p)	FC Vallant/Les Grès (9)
52.	FC Bologne (9)	2–1	AF Valcourt (10)
53.	AS Poissons-Noncourt (9)	1–4	Espérance Saint-Dizier (8)
54.	Foyer Bayard (10)	0–6	Stade Chevillonnais (7)
55.	Colombey FC (11)	1–6	CS Maranville-Rennepont (8)
56.	CS Doulaincourt-Saucourt (10)	0–0 (5–4 p)	FC Laville-aux-Bois (10)
57.	SL Ornel (8)	0–2	US Wassy Brousseval (9)
58.	FC Villiers-en-Lieu (10)	1–5	FC Joinville-Vecqueville (8)
59.	FCCS Bragard (10)	2–2 (2–4 p)	ES Andelot-Rimaucourt-Bourdons (8)
60.	Bar-sur-Aube FC (8)	1–0	US Montier-en-Der (8)
61.	ES Breuvannes (11)	0–5	FC Prez Bourmont (9)
62.	US Bourbonnaise (10)	1–4	CO Langres (10)
63.	US Arc-en-Barrois (10)	1–1 (2–4 p)	CA Rolampontais (9)
64.	SR Neuilly-l'Évêque (9)	3–1	FC Châteauvillain (9)
65.	FC Dampierre (10)	2–2 (4–3 p)	FC Châteauvillain (9)
66.	US Biesles (9)	2–0	ES Prauthoy-Vaux (8)
67.	US Rouvres (11)	0–7	ASPTT Chaumont (9)
68.	Saint-Gilles FC (10)	0–7	CS Chalindrey (8)
69.	Bulgnéville Contrex Vittel FC (8)	0–1	AS Girancourt-Dommartin-Chaumousey (8)
70.	AS Essegney-Langley (12)	0–3	CS Charmes (9)
71.	FC Charmois-l'Orgueilleux (11)	0–3	US Lamarche (10)
72.	US Mirecourt-Hymont (10)	1–4	ES Avière Darnieulles (8)
73.	ASC Dompaire (10)	1–3	AS Darney (10)
74.	AS Gironcourt (9)	3–0	LSC Portieux (10)
75.	JS Châtenois (12)	3–0	FC Martigny-les-Bains (10)
76.	US Val de Saône (11)	0–4	ASL Coussey-Greux (10)
77.	La Saint-Maurice Poussay (11)	0–7	FC Neufchâteau-Liffol (10)
78.	FC Le Tholy (11)	0–4	FC Hadol-Dounoux (9)
79.	AS Ramonchamp (11)	0–2	FC Remiremont Saint-Étienne (8)
80.	US Arches-Archettes-Raon (10)	1–1 (5–6 p)	AS Saint-Nabord (8)
81.	AS Vagney (8)	1–1 (4–2 p)	FC Haute Moselotte (9)
82.	ASF Saulxures-sur-Moselotte-Thiéfosse (12)	4–1	AS Stade Ruppéen (12)
83.	FC Vierge (11)	9–0	FC Val d'Ajol (11)
84.	AS Cheniménil (10)	1–6	FC Éloyes (8)
85.	SR Pouxeux Jarménil (10)	1–1 (3–5 p)	FC Amerey Xertigny (9)
86.	FC Dommartin-lès-Remiremont (11)	1–5	AS Plombières (10)
87.	CS Thillotin (11)	0–3	FC Des Ballons (9)
88.	US Senones (12)	0–6	SM Etival (10)
89.	ES Michelloise (12)	1–7	SM Bruyères (10)
90.	FC Granges-sur-Vologne (10)	0–2	CS Ramberviller (11)
91.	AS Padoux (9)	2–6	AS Gérardmer (8)
92.	SM Taintrux (11)	2–4	RC Corcieux (12)
93.	AS Nomexy-Vincey (9)	1–1 (2–3 p)	Dogneville FC (10)
94.	AS Rehaincourt Moriville (10)	0–2	Entente Bru-Jeanménil SBH (9)
95.	FC Sainte-Marguerite (8)	10–1	ES Haute Meurthe (9)
96.	AS Girmont (12)	0–11	Saulcy FC (9)
97.	SC Les Islettes (10)	0–3	US Behonne-Longeville-en-Barois (9)
98.	Association Saint-Laurent-Mangiennes (10)	2–1	FC Dugny (9)
99.	Entente Centre Ornain (8)	4–1	AS Dieue-Sommedieue (9)
100.	FC Pagny-sur-Meuse (10)	0–2	AS Tréveray (9)
101.	FC Revigny (9)	2–1	FC Fains-Véel (9)
102.	ES Lérouvillois Cheminote (10)	7–3	RC Sommedieue (10)
103.	FC Belleray (10)	0–3	US Thierville (8)
104.	ES Maizey-Lacroix (9)	2–0	AS Val d'Ornain (10)
105.	RC Saulx et Barrois (9)	2–1	SC Commercy (10)
106.	Gars de l'Ornois Gondrecourt-Le-Château (11)	0–7	Entente Vigneulles-Hannonville-Fresne (8)
107.	AS Stenay Mouzay (10)	0–3	Lorraine Vaucouleurs (8)
108.	AS Baudonvilliers (10)	0–10	FC Saint-Mihiel (8)
109.	Entente Sorcy Void-Vacon (7)	0–0 (3–2 p)	SF Verdun Belleville (8)
110.	ES Tilly-Ambly Villers-Bouquemont (10)	1–1 (1–3 p)	ASC Montiers-sur-Saulx (11)
111.	JS Thil (11)	1–0	CSP Réhon (9)
112.	Olympic Saint Charles Haucourt (12)	0–7	CS Godbrange (8)
113.	Olympique Valleroy Moineville Hatrize (10)	3–1	USL Mont Saint-Martin (9)
114.	AS Saulnes Longlaville (8)	2–0	ES Crusnes (8)
115.	US Beuveille (11)	1–0	USB Longwy (8)
116.	ES Gorcy-Cosnes (10)	3–3 (2–4 p)	US Batilly (9)
117.	Entente Réhon Villers Morfontaine (9)	0–5	US Conflans (9)
118.	GS Thiaucourt (10)	1–1 (4–2 p)	US Briey (8)
119.	FC Pays Audunois (11)	0–10	US Jarny (8)
120.	ES Vallée de l'Othain (11)	2–1	US Lexy (10)
121.	RC Pierrepont (11)	3–7	ES Longuyon (8)
122.	AS Tucquegnieux-Trieux (10)	5–1	AS Mars-la-Tour (11)
123.	SC Baccarat (10)	2–0	Football Lunéville Turc (11)
124.	FJEP Magnières (10)	2–2 (1–3 p)	FC Montois (10)
125.	GAS Saint-Clément-Laronxe (11)	0–4	AS Laneuveville Marainviller (9)
126.	FC Sommerviller (11)	0–8	FC Dombasle-sur-Meurthe (8)
127.	AS Rehainviller Hériménil (9)	1–1 (4–2 p)	US Rosières-aux-Salines (10)
128.	AS Varangéville-Saint-Nicolas (9)	1–4	Espérance Gerbéviller (10)
129.	ES Bayon-Roville (10)	0–4	ES Lunéville Sixte (9)
130.	FC Cirey-sur-Vezouze (12)	1–4	AS MJC Blâmont (11)
131.	ES Charmois Damelevières (10)	4–3	ES Badonviller-Celles (11)
132.	Nurhak FC (12)	0–7	AS Villey-Saint Étienne (8)
133.	AS Colombey (10)	1–1 (5–6 p)	AS Ludres (8)
134.	AJS René II (10)	6–0	ES Bicqueley (11)
135.	FC Houdemont (9)	0–0 (4–5 p)	FC Écrouves (9)
136.	FC Richardménil-Flavigny-Méréville-Messein (10)	1–4	COS Villers (7)
137.	GS Vézelise (11)	3–3 (4–2 p)	FC Toul (9)
138.	AS Velaine-en-Haye (11)	3–0	Entente Sud 54 (11)
139.	AS Dommartin-lès-Toul (11)	1–4	ES Laneuveville (9)
140.	AS Chavigny (11)	0–5	AS Gondreville (8)
141.	Toul JCA (8)	3–0	Stade Flévillois (9)
142.	FC Loisy (12)	1–3	SC Malzéville (9)
143.	GSA Tomblaine (11)	0–4	AF Laxou Sapinière (7)
144.	MJC Pichon (9)	0–5	Maxéville FC (9)
145.	AS Grand Couronné (9)	1–2	ASC Saulxures-lès-Nancy (9)
146.	Omnisports Frouard Pompey (10)	0–2	ENJ Val-de-Seille (9)
147.	FC Dieulouard (9)	3–2	ES Custines-Malleloy (8)
148.	AS Lay-Saint-Christophe/Bouxieres-aux-Dames (8)	0–0 (3–4 p)	FC Seichamps (9)
149.	AJSE Montauville (10)	0–0 (4–3 p)	FR Faulx (11)
150.	SC Saizerais (11)	2–7	AS Haut-du-Lièvre Nancy (8)
151.	ASPTT Nancy (11)	0–0 (4–1 p)	Olympique Haussonville (10)
152.	USF Brouderdorff (10)	3–1	Sportive Lorquinoise (9)
153.	EFT Sarrebourg (9)	3–2	FC Abreschviller (10)
154.	SR Sarraltroff (11)	1–5	Olympique Mittelbronn 04 (11)
155.	AS Brouviller (10)	1–3	SS Hilbesheim (10)
156.	FC Saint-Quirin (12)	0–4	AS Bettborn Hellering (8)
157.	SR Langatte (11)	0–8	AS Réding (8)
158.	FC Dieuze (9)	6–0	FC Dannelbourg (10)
159.	ES Avricourt Moussey (10)	0–2	SR Gosselming (10)
160.	US Schneckenbusch (10)	0–8	Montagnarde Walscheid (9)
161.	ÉS Garrebourg (12)	2–2 (7–6 p)	AS Réchicourt-le-Château (11)
162.	SF Enchenberg (11)	3–4	Entente Schorbach Hottviller Volmunster 13 (11)
163.	FC Rahling (10)	5–0	Saint-Louis 2017 (11)
164.	AS Mouterhouse (10)	2–3	AS Bliesbruck (8)
165.	ES Pays du Bitche 2020 (9)	0–1	US Goetzenbruck-Meisenthal (8)
166.	CS Folpersviller (12)	0–3	AS Kalhausen (10)
167.	FC Waldhouse-Walschbronn (10)	0–4	US Soucht (8)
168.	FC Bitche (10)	3–3 (4–5 p)	AS Montbronn (9)
169.	AS Welferding (11)	0–6	ES Rimling-Erching-Obergailbach (11)
170.	ES Gros Réderching-Bettviller (10)	2–0	FC Lemberg-Saint-Louis (10)
171.	ES Wies-Woelf 93 (10)	2–2 (5–4 p)	FC Beausoleil Sarreguemines (10)
172.	CS Wittring (11)	1–2	AS Neunkirch (8)
173.	FC Creutzberg Forbach (10)	6–2	FC Hambach (10)
174.	ES Petite-Rosselle (8)	0–2	US Behren-lès-Forbach (8)
175.	US Roth (9)	0–8	US Farébersviller 05 (8)
176.	FC Freyming (8)	2–1	FC Sarralbe (9)
177.	FC Farschviller (11)	1–5	US Rouhling (10)
178.	US Hundling (11)	0–0 (3–4 p)	CS Diebling (9)
179.	US Alsting-Zinzing (10)	0–0 (5–4 p)	US Morsbach (11)
180.	AS Kerbach (10)	6–1	Entente Neufgrange-Siltzheim (11)
181.	FC Verrerie-Sophie (11)	1–0	US Woustviller (11)
182.	FC Metzing (9)	1–1 (5–4 p)	CS Stiring-Wendel (9)
183.	US Holving (9)	1–1 (3–5 p)	SO Merlebach (8)
184.	AS Lixing-lès-Rouhling (11)	1–8	FC Hochwald (8)
185.	US Spicheren (9)	0–2	SO Ippling (10)
186.	FC Longeville-lès-Saint-Avold (8)	0–2	SR Creutzwald 03 (8)
187.	CO Bouzonville (10)	4–1	FC L'Hôpital (11)
188.	AS Falck (11)	3–2	FC Vœlfling (11)
189.	FC Carling (10)	0–2	FC Coume (9)
190.	US Bambiderstroff (11)	4–1	FC Ham-sous-Varsberg 2.0 (12)
191.	Flétrange SA (10)	1–1 (3–2 p)	US Filstroff (10)
192.	AS Anzeling Edling (11)	7–0	US Waldweistroff (11)
193.	JS Rémering (11)	0–4	MJC Volmerange-lès-Boulay (8)
194.	ES Villing (11)	0–3	ASJA Saint-Avold (11)
195.	AS Rech (11)	3–1	FC Altrippe (12)
196.	ES Macheren Petit-Ebersviller (9)	4–1	FC Château-Salins (9)
197.	FC Francaltroff (11)	1–0	JS Wenheck (8)
198.	AS Vibersviller (11)	0–5	FC Folschviller (9)
199.	SC Vic-sur-Seille (9)	1–2	ES Faulquemont-Créhange (9)
200.	US Saint-Jean-Rohrbach (11)	2–0	AS Grostenquin Bérig Bistroff (10)
201.	AS Teting-sur-Nied (10)	3–4	US Bénestroff (10)
202.	US Valmont (8)	6–0	AS Hellimer (9)
203.	AS Le Val-de-Guéblange (10)	3–1	ES Béchy (11)
204.	ES Lixing-Laning 95 (10)	1–3	EF Delme-Solgne (8)
205.	US Hilsprich (11)	1–1 (7–6 p)	Grains de Sable Nébing (9)
206.	AS Sœtrich (10)	1–3	SC Terville (11)
207.	AS Entrange (12)	0–1	US Volkrange (10)
208.	RS Serémange-Erzange (10)	2–1	CS Volmerange-les-Mines (10)
209.	AS Florange-Ebange (10)	2–2 (5–4 p)	US Yutz (9)
210.	JL Knutange (11)	0–5	RC Nilvange (11)
211.	US Oudrenne (9)	6–2	ES Garche (10)
212.	JS Audunoise (9)	1–5	AS Algrange (8)
213.	US Marspich (10)	1–12	FC Yutz (7)
214.	JSA Yutz Cité (11)	1–7	ASC Basse-Ham (9)
215.	AS Lommerange (11)	0–3	US Illange (9)
216.	Entente Bure-Boulange (9)	0–6	US Cattenom (10)
217.	AS Œutrange (12)	3–0	AS Neufchef (10)
218.	ES Kœnigsmacker-Kédange (8)	1–2	FC Hayange (8)
219.	US Fontoy (9)	3–0	AS Konacker (10)
220.	US Aumetz (11)	0–2	US Guentrange (9)
221.	JSO Ennery (11)	4–0	RS La Maxe (10)
222.	AS Volstroff (10)	3–0	FC Veckring (12)
223.	ES Richemont (9)	2–2 (4–2 p)	FC Woippy (10)
224.	JS Bousse (10)	0–2	UL Rombas (8)
225.	ES Maizières (11)	0–0 (3–2 p)	AG Metzervisse (9)
226.	AS Clouange (8)	4–3	AS Les Côteaux (8)
227.	FC Guénange (9)	3–1	FC Pierrevillers (10)
228.	US Froidcul (9)	0–0 (2–4 p)	ES Rosselange Vitry (8)
229.	AS du Plateau Sainte-Marie-aux-Chênes (11)	0–1	FC Mondelange (10)
230.	AS Hauconcourt (10)	1–2	AS Talange (9)
231.	JS Distroff (11)	3–1	US Vigy (11)
232.	TS Bertrange (10)	1–4	ES Marange-Silvange (8)
233.	ES Courcelles-sur-Nied (8)	11–0	JS Ancy-sur-Moselle (11)
234.	CSJ Augny (11)	4–1	US Courcelles-Chaussy (9)
235.	Club des Amis du Dimanche Matin Metz (11)	0–2	Excelsior Cuvry (9)
236.	US ACLI Metz (10)	3–5	FC Devant-les-Ponts Metz (8)
237.	Fleury FC (10)	0–2	SC Marly (8)
238.	FC Retonfey Noisseville Montoy-Flanville (11)	1–3	ES Woippy (9)
239.	US Châtel-Saint-Germain (9)	1–1 (5–4 p)	ES Metz (8)
240.	SC Moulins-lès-Metz (10)	4–2	AS Corny (10)
241.	UL Plantières Metz (8)	9–0	JS Ars-Laquenexy (9)
242.	Ars-sur-Moselle FC (11)	5–0	JS Metz (12)
243.	FC Verny-Louvigny-Cuvry (9)	7–1	US Ban-Saint-Martin (8)
244.	Entente Gravelotte-Verneville (11)	1–1 (3–4 p)	FC Novéant (8)
245.	FC Rott (15)	0–2	SC Rittershoffen (11)
246.	AS Hatten (12)	0–3	FC Scheibenhard (8)
247.	AS Wœrth (12)	2–1	AS Seebach (10)
248.	FC Riedseltz (10)	5–0	FR Schœnenbourg-Memmelshoffen (11)
249.	FC Trimbach (16)	1–2	FC Oberroedern/Aschbach (10)
250.	Entente Drachenbronn-Birlenbach (12)	1–3	US Preuschdorf-Langensoultzbach (8)
251.	FC Hoffen (13)	0–3	US Schleithal (9)
252.	FC Niederlauterbach (10)	1–4	AS Betschdorf (8)
253.	US Surbourg (12)	1–0	CO Climbach (13)
254.	Entente Mothern Munchhausen (9)	2–0	FC Soultz-sous-Forêts/Kutzenhausen (9)
255.	FC Lampertsloch-Merkswiller (12)	0–4	FC Wissembourg/Altenstadt (12)
256.	FC Niederrœdern/Olympique Schaffhouse (13)	0–6	AS Hunspach (8)
257.	FC Oberhoffen (10)	3–0	ES Offendorf (13)
258.	AS Forstfeld (12)	1–3	AS Kurtzenhouse (11)
259.	AS Kilstett (11)	3–2	FC Soufflenheim (11)
260.	FC Niederschaeffolsheim (11)	1–1 (4–5 p)	FC Geudertheim (9)
261.	La Wantzenau FC (11)	8–3	FC Gries (12)
262.	SC Roppenheim (12)	1–4	AS Gambsheim (9)
263.	Fatih-Sport Haguenau (11)	0–3	SC Rœschwoog (10)
264.	US Dalhunden (12)	1–3	FC Weitbruch (10)
265.	FR Sessenheim-Stattmatten (9)	1–0	SR Rountzenheim-Auenheim (9)
266.	AS Saint-Barthelemy Leutenheim (13)	2–5	FC Herrlisheim (8)
267.	FC Bischwiller (12)	2–5	SS Brumath (10)
268.	SS Beinheim (11)	1–6	AS Hoerdt (8)
269.	Entente Kaltenhouse/Marienthal (9)	1–1 (5–4 p)	US Turcs Bischwiller (8)
270.	FCE Reichshoffen (13)	0–2	AS Mertzwiller (9)
271.	FC Wingersheim (9)	1–2	AS Uhrwiller (10)
272.	FC Alteckendorf (11)	1–10	AS Hochfelden (8)
273.	FC Kindwiller (11)	0–2	FC Durrenbach (9)
274.	US Gumbrechtshoffen (11)	0–2	AS Platania Gundershoffen (8)
275.	FC Niedermodern (13)	2–2 (0–3 p)	US Ettendorf (10)
276.	FC Batzendorf (13)	0–2	FA Val de Moder (10)
277.	AS Schillersdorf (10)	2–2 (9–10 p)	AS Ohlungen (8)
278.	US Mommenheim (11)	0–1	AS Ingwiller/Menchhoffen (8)
279.	FC Schwindratzheim (12)	2–1	FC Dauendorf (13)
280.	ÉS Morsbronn (13)	0–4	US Wittersheim (9)
281.	Olympique Zinswiller (13)	1–3	FC Eschbach (10)
282.	FC Schaffhouse-sur-Zorn (12)	0–2	AC Hinterfeld (11)
283.	CS Waldhambach (11)	2–3	FC Keskastel (9)
284.	FC Dossenheim-sur-Zinsel (10)	0–3	ASI Avenir (8)
285.	CSIE Harskirchen (12)	0–3	FC Saverne (8)
286.	AS Rehthal (12)	3–0	FC Oermingen (13)
287.	AS Wieterswiller (13)	1–6	FC Ernolsheim-lès-Saverne (12)
288.	ASC Brotsch (12)	1–6	AS Butten-Diemeringen (8)
289.	US Wimmenau (11)	2–1	AS Lupstein (9)
290.	AS Weyer (10)	5–3	FC Mackwiller (11)
291.	FC Steinbourg (12)	2–0	FC Monswiller (12)
292.	AS Wingen-sur-Moder (12)	2–2 (8–7 p)	AS Sarrewerden (12)
293.	SC Dettwiller (11)	1–1 (2–3 p)	AS Weinbourg (11)
294.	FC Waldolwisheim (13)	0–5	Entente Trois Maisons-Phalsbourg (9)
295.	AS Wilwisheim (13)	0–3	US Imbsheim (11)
296.	FC Niederhausbergen (12)	2–2 (3–4 p)	US Eckwershiem (10)
297.	ASLC Berstett (13)	1–0	AS Dingsheim-Griesheim (11)
298.	AS Reichstett (10)	1–4	FC Ecrivains-Schiltigheim-Bischheim (10)
299.	Entente de la Mossig Wasselonne/Romanswiller (11)	0–3	ASL Robertsau (8)
300.	FC Marlenheim-Kirchheim (11)	1–2	FC Oberhausbergen (9)
301.	FC Truchtersheim (9)	3–2	SR Hoenheim (9)
302.	FC Souffelweyersheim (9)	0–2	ASE Cité de l'Ill Strasbourg (10)
303.	AS Hohengœft (11)	0–3	AS Mundolsheim (8)
304.	FC Lampertheim (9)	4–1	ASL Duntzenheim (10)
305.	FC Quatzenheim (12)	2–2 (4–2 p)	AS Nordheim-Kuttolsheim (13)
306.	SR Furdenheim (13)	1–2	AS Espagnols Schiltigheim (12)
307.	AS Willgottheim (11)	0–2	ES Pfettisheim (9)
308.	AJF Hautepierre (10)	5–3	AS Neudorf (8)
309.	CS Neuhof Strasbourg (9)	3–2	OC Lipsheim (10)
310.	AP Joie et Santé Strasbourg (9)	1–0	US Hindisheim (9)
311.	US Hangenbieten (11)	0–7	EB Achenheim (8)
312.	ASC Blaesheim (13)	10–0	US Égalitaire (13)
313.	ES Wolfisheim (13)	0–2	FC Lingolsheim (10)
314.	FC Hipsheim (13)	0–2	FC Eschau (9)
315.	FC Stockfeld Colombes (12)	0–2	US Oberschaeffolsheim (8)
316.	FC Entzheim (11)	0–1	FC Eckbolsheim (8)
317.	AS Musau Strasbourg (9)	2–4	AS Strasbourg (8)
318.	CS Fegersheim (8)	0–1	US Nordhouse (8)
319.	AS Holtzheim (10)	0–1	Internationale Meinau Académie (9)
320.	CA Plobsheim (12)	4–1	FC Breuschwickersheim (11)
321.	SC Red Star Strasbourg (10)	5–2	FC Ostwald (10)
322.	AS Natzwiller (11)	2–5	FC Dahlenheim (8)
323.	CS Bernardswiller (11)	2–1	AS Wisches-Russ-Lutzelhouse (10)
324.	FC Dangolsheim (12)	4–1	FC Grendelbruch (12)
325.	ES Haslach-Urmatt (13)	3–0	CS Wolxheim (12)
326.	US Goxwiller (13)	2–14	US Dachstein (10)
327.	US Meistratzheim (13)	3–4	USL Duppigheim (9)
328.	AS Portugais Barembach-Bruche (12)	4–2	AS Niedernai (10)
329.	AS Altorf (12)	2–2 (4–3 p)	FC Rosheim (12)
330.	AS Mutzig (8)	0–1	ASB Schirmeck-La Broque (9)
331.	Erno FC (13)	1–0	AS Bischoffsheim (8)
332.	FC Avolsheim (13)	1–3	FC Krautergersheim (10)
333.	FC Boersch (11)	0–5	ALFC Duttlenheim (8)
334.	SR Dorlisheim (13)	0–3	SC Dinsheim (12)
335.	FC Balbronn (12)	3–3 (4–5 p)	AS Bergbieten (13)
336.	AS Diebolsheim Friesenheim (13)	1–8	AS Saint-Pierre-Bois/Triembach-au-Val (10)
337.	SC Maisonsgoutte (13)	0–5	US Scherwiller (9)
338.	US Huttenheim (12)	0–3	FC Rhinau (8)
339.	AS Obenheim (13)	0–4	AS Sermersheim (10)
340.	ES Stotzheim (11)	7–1	FC Hilsenheim (12)
341.	UJ Epfig (9)	3–3 (3–1 p)	SC Ebersheim (10)
342.	SR Zellwiller (11)	2–1	FC Kogenheim (11)
343.	FC Barr (12)	1–4	FC Herbsheim (11)
344.	FC Ebersmunster (15)	2–0	FC Kertzfeld (12)
345.	US Dambach-la-Ville (12)	0–4	FC Matzenheim (10)
346.	AS Heiligenstein (12)	1–0	FC Bindernheim (9)
347.	AS Saint-Hippolyte (13)	2–0	SR Bergheim (10)
348.	US Artzenheim (13)	0–2	FC Grussenheim (10)
349.	AS Châtenois (11)	2–3	FR Jebsheim-Muntzenheim (10)
350.	FC Artolsheim (11)	2–5	AS Schœnau (11)
351.	AS Mussig (9)	1–2	AS Portugais Sélestat (10)
352.	RC Kintzheim (9)	1–0	AS Marckolsheim (10)
353.	US Sundhouse (11)	3–0	FCI Riquewihr (12)
354.	FC Ostheim-Houssen (8)	0–0 (8–9 p)	FC Illhaeusern (8)
355.	SC Sélestat (8)	3–0	AS Muttersholtz (13)
356.	AS Elsenheim (11)	1–6	AS Guémar (8)
357.	FC Hessenheim (13)	2–5	US Baldenheim (8)
358.	FC Portugais Colmar (11)	3–4	AS Andolsheim (11)
359.	FC Oberhergheim (12)	2–2 (4–1 p)	FC Heiteren (10)
360.	AS Canton Vert (10)	2–5	FC Bennwihr (8)
361.	AS Herrlisheim (13)	3–0	US Colmar (9)
362.	FC Wettolsheim (11)	1–2	AS Munster (8)
363.	FC Niederhergheim (9)	1–2	FC Sainte-Croix-en-Plaine (8)
364.	FC Colmar Unifié (11)	0–3	SR Widensolen (10)
365.	AS Pfaffenheim (9)	1–1 (1–2 p)	FC Ingersheim (9)
366.	AS Hattstatt (13)	0–3	FC Horbourg-Wihr (9)
367.	AS Sigolsheim (12)	0–4	AS Turckheim (10)
368.	Racing HW 96 (7)	3–2	FC Wintzfelden-Osenbach (8)
369.	AS Wintzenheim (12)	1–3	SR Kaysersberg (8)
370.	US Pulversheim FC (9)	1–3	FC Kingersheim (9)
371.	US Bantzenheim Rumersheim (9)	3–2	FC Ungersheim (10)
372.	FC Munchhouse (10)	1–1 (4–1 p)	FC Hirtzfelden (8)
373.	AS Rixheim (10)	0–4	'FC Ensisheim (11)
374.	FCRS Richwiller (8)	4–3	FC Meyenheim (8)
375.	FC Battenheim (12)	3–3 (8–9 p)	FC Anatolie Mulhouse (10)
376.	FC Fessenheim (8)	2–2 (2–3 p)	FC Sausheim (9)
377.	AS Blodelsheim (12)	1–8	AS Theodore Ruelisheim Wittenheim (9)
378.	FC Baldersheim (9)	1–2	FC Réguisheim (9)
379.	FC Masevaux (11)	0–1	ASCA Wittelsheim (10)
380.	FC Merxheim (9)	0–0 (3–1 p)	US Vallée de la Thur (8)
381.	Thann FC 2017 (11)	1–0	AS Aspach-le-Haut (10)
382.	FC Feldkirch (10)	0–7	FC Rouffach (8)
383.	FC Buhl (10)	0–3	AS Raedersheim (8)
384.	US Oberbruck Dolleren (10)	2–5	Cernay FC (8)
385.	FC Bollwiller (15)	0–3	FC Sentheim (9)
386.	FC Gundolsheim (11)	1–4	AS Blanc Vieux-Thann (8)
387.	SR Saint-Amarin (9)	1–0	AS Guewenheim (10)
388.	FC Illfurth (10)	2–8	Real ASPTT Mulhouse CF (8)
389.	AS Hochstatt (12)	1–3	FC Riedisheim (8)
390.	AS Schlierbach (12)	1–2	CS Mulhouse Bourtzwiller (9)
391.	RC Mulhouse (10)	2–3	Étoile Mulhouse (11)
392.	FC Habsheim (8)	1–1 (3–0 p)	AS Lutterbach (9)
393.	FC Morschwiller-le-Bas (8)	4–1	FC Pfastatt 1926 (8)
394.	Mouloudia Mulhouse (8)	2–0	AS Heimsbrunn (9)
395.	FC Blue Star Reiningue (10)	1–5	FC Brunstatt (8)
396.	US Zimmersheim-Eschentzwiller (11)	0–3	SS Zillisheim (8)
397.	US Azzurri Mulhouse (10)	4–2	FC Steinbrunn-le-Bas (10)
398.	Saint-Georges Carspach (13)	0–0 (5–3 p)	FC Sierentz (10)
399.	FC Traubach (10)	2–0	FC Village Neuf (10)
400.	FC Rosenau (10)	2–3	FC Uffheim (8)
401.	ASCCO Helfrantzkirch (11)	2–3	FC Seppois-Bisel (9)
402.	AS Hausgauen (12)	2–1	FC Obermorschwiller/Tagsdorf (10)
403.	AS Luemschwiller (13)	0–3	Entente Grentzingen-Bettendorf (11)
404.	US Pfetterhouse Ueberstrass (12)	0–3	Entente Hagenbach-Balschwiller (9)
405.	AS Durlinsdorf (11)	5–0	AS Mertzen (9)
406.	US Hirsingue (8)	2–2 (6–5 p)	Montreux Sports (9)
407.	FC Kappelen (10)	3–0	FC Hirtzbach (8)
408.	RC Dannemarie (9)	4–1	US Hésingue (9)
409.	Alliance Muespach-Folgensbourg (10)	1–3	AS Altkirch (8)
410.	FC Hagenthal-Wentzwiller (9)	1–1 (4–2 p)	AS Riespach (10)

=== Second round ===
These matches were played on 11 and 12 September 2021, with two rearranged or replayed on 19 September 2021.

Second round results: Grand Est
Tie no	Home team (tier)	Score	Away team (tier)
1.	ES Auvillers/Signy-le-Petit (11)	0–6	USA Le Chesne (7)
2.	SOS Buzancy (11)	1–1 (2–3 p)	Le Theux FC (7)
3.	Joyeuse de Warcq (11)	2–2 (4–5 p)	FC Blagny-Carignan (7)
4.	Olympique Torcy-Sedan (7)	0–2	AS Val de l'Aisne (8)
5.	FC Haybes (9)	1–8	AS Asfeld (7)
6.	USC Nouvion-sur-Meuse (9)	1–1 (4–5 p)	Cheveuges-Saint-Aignan CO (10)
7.	ES Charleville-Mézières (8)	0–1	US Bazeilles (8)
8.	Floing FC (9)	1–0	ES Saulces-Monclin (9)
9.	JS Vrignoise (11)	0–7	Olympique Charleville Neufmanil Aiglemont (8)
10.	AS Bourg-Rocroi (8)	0–2	CA Villers-Semeuse (7)
11.	US Revin (8)	5–0	US Fumay-Charnois (8)
12.	AS Lumes (10)	2–3	AS Tournes/Renwez/Les Mazures/Arreux/Montcornet (7)
13.	Reims Murigny Franco Portugais (9)	7–1	Nord Champagne FC (7)
14.	FC Porcien (8)	1–1 (1–3 p)	FCF La Neuvillette-Jamin (8)
15.	US Esternay (10)	0–2	Vitry FC (8)
16.	CS Agéen (8)	3–3 (6–7 p)	FC Épernay (7)
17.	FC Morgendois (10)	4–0	FC Faux-Vésigneul-Pogny (9)
18.	US Oiry (8)	4–1 (Note: Tie reversed from original draw.)	Groupe Portugais de Reims (12)
19.	Foyer Compertrix (9)	2–1	USS Sermaize (10)
20.	Entente Étoges-Vert (11)	1–5	ES Fagnières (8)
21.	SL Pontfaverger (10)	2–1	Bétheny FC (8)
22.	AS Taissy (8)	3–1	ES Witry-les-Reims (8)
23.	Reims Jeunes Consacré (11)	2–3	Châlons FCO (7)
24.	FC Tinqueux Champagne (9)	2–4	FC Côte des Blancs (7)
25.	AS Cernay-Berru-Lavannes (7)	1–0	SC Sézannais (7)
26.	ES Pierry Moussy (11)	1–2	FC Christo (7)
27.	FC Saint-Martin-sur-le-Pré/La Veuve/Recy (10)	0–4	ASPTT Châlons (7)
28.	AS Chartreux (9)	4–0	JS Vaudoise (7)
29.	Alliance Sud-Ouest Football Aubois (8)	5–0	Rosières Omnisports (7)
30.	FC Malgache (7)	1–1 (4–5 p)	JS Saint-Julien FC (8)
31.	Bar-sur-Aube FC (8)	1–1 (5–4 p)	ES Municipaux Troyes (8)
32.	AS Tertre (9)	1–1 (3–1 p)	Étoile Chapelaine (8)
33.	FC Nord Est Aubois (8)	1–0	US Dienville (8)
34.	AS Inter Asiatique Troyes (9)	1–1 (2–4 p)	ES Celles-Essoyes (10)
35.	ES Gault-Soigny (9)	1–3	Foyer Barsequanais (7)
36.	FC Joinville-Vecqueville (8)	3–2	CA Rolampontais (9)
37.	ASPTT Chaumont (9)	4–4 (3–4 p)	US Biesles (9)
38.	FC Bologne (9)	0–0 (3–4 p)	CO Langres (10)
39.	FC Dampierre (10)	0–6	Stade Chevillonnais (7)
40.	CS Doulaincourt-Saucourt (10)	1–5	FC Saints-Geosmois (7)
41.	ES Andelot-Rimaucourt-Bourdons (8)	1–0	SR Neuilly-l'Évêque (9)
42.	CS Chalindrey (8)	2–2 (3–4 p)	US Wassy Brousseval (9)
43.	FC Prez Bourmont (9)	5–2	CS Maranville-Rennepont (8)
44.	AS Tréveray (9)	3–1	FC Revigny (9)
45.	US Behonne-Longeville-en-Barois (9)	0–0 (5–3 p)	Lorraine Vaucouleurs (8)
46.	ES Maizey-Lacroix (9)	0–1	US Etain-Buzy (7)
47.	Association Saint-Laurent-Mangiennes (10)	3–2	ES Lérouvillois Cheminote (10)
48.	Entente Vigneulles-Hannonville-Fresne (8)	2–1	RC Saulx et Barrois (9)
49.	ASC Montiers-sur-Saulx (11)	1–9	Entente Centre Ornain (8)
50.	US Thierville (8)	1–3	Entente Sorcy Void-Vacon (7)
51.	Espérance Saint-Dizier (8)	3–2	FC Saint-Mihiel (8)
52.	FC Des Ballons (9)	1–2	FC Amerey Xertigny (9)
53.	FC Vierge (11)	0–1	FC Remiremont Saint-Étienne (8)
54.	AS Girancourt-Dommartin-Chaumousey (8)	1–1 (4–3 p)	AS Vagney (8)
55.	AS Darney (10)	2–4	AS Saint-Nabord (8)
56.	ASF Saulxures-sur-Moselotte-Thiéfosse (12)	1–1 (Note: Match abandoned in the 90th minute, due to a fight between players and a pitch invasion. ASF Saulxures-sur-Moselotte-Thiéfosse penalised. US Lamarche qualify.)	US Lamarche (10)
57.	Saulcy FC (9)	1–1 (4–5 p)	SC Baccarat (10)
58.	ASL Coussey-Greux (10)	0–0 (2–3 p)	CS Charmes (9)
59.	SM Etival (10)	1–1 (3–4 p)	SM Bruyères (10)
60.	GS Neuves-Maisons (7)	14–0 (Note: The match was originally to be played at Dogneville, but the referee declared that the pitch was not correctly marked out. Match replayed on 19 September 2021 at Neuves-Maisons.)	Dogneville FC (10)
61.	AS Gironcourt (9)	0–2	JS Châtenois (12)
62.	Entente Bru-Jeanménil SBH (9)	1–1 (4–5 p) (Note: Original match was abandoned after 82 minutes with the scoreline 2–1, when spectators on a hill overlooking the stadium lit flares. Match replayed on 19 September 2021.)	GS Haroué-Benney (7)
63.	FC Neufchâteau-Liffol (10)	4–3	FC Hadol-Dounoux (9)
64.	RC Corcieux (12)	3–3 (4–3 p)	AS Gérardmer (8)
65.	CS Ramberviller (11)	1–17	FC Éloyes (8)
66.	AS Plombières (10)	2–3	FC Sainte-Marguerite (8)
67.	ES Avière Darnieulles (8)	1–1 (1–3 p)	SR Saint-Dié (7)
68.	ES Lunéville Sixte (9)	1–1 (2–3 p)	AF Laxou Sapinière (7)
69.	AS MJC Blâmont (11)	7–0	FC Montois (10)
70.	SC Malzéville (9)	3–2	FC Dombasle-sur-Meurthe (8)
71.	Espérance Gerbéviller (10)	0–8	AC Blainville-Damelevières (7)
72.	ES Charmois Damelevières (10)	0–4 (Note: Match abandoned due to ES Charmois Damelevières having less than 8 players remaining. AS Gondreville qualify.)	AS Gondreville (8)
73.	AS Haut-du-Lièvre Nancy (8)	3–1	ASC Saulxures-lès-Nancy (9)
74.	GS Vézelise (11)	1–0	AS Velaine-en-Haye (11)
75.	Maxéville FC (9)	0–0 (4–5 p)	FC Dieulouard (9)
76.	AS Rehainviller Hériménil (9)	0–4	FC Saint-Max-Essey (7)
77.	FC Écrouves (9)	1–9	ES Heillecourt (7)
78.	AS Villey-Saint Étienne (8)	0–0 (3–5 p)	Toul JCA (8)
79.	ASPTT Nancy (11)	2–2 (4–5 p)	AS Ludres (8)
80.	ES Laneuveville (9)	4–0	AS Laneuveville Marainviller (9)
81.	FC Seichamps (9)	1–3	COS Villers (7)
82.	ENJ Val-de-Seille (9)	3–1	AJS René II (10)
83.	AJSE Montauville (10)	0–0 (5–6 p)	FC Pulnoy (7)
84.	AS Œutrange (12)	3–1	ES Longuyon (8)
85.	CS Godbrange (8)	2–2 (4–5 p)	US Batilly (9)
86.	JS Thil (11)	1–4	Val de l'Orne FC (7)
87.	GS Thiaucourt (10)	2–0	AS Tucquegnieux-Trieux (10)
88.	Olympique Valleroy Moineville Hatrize (10)	0–3	FC Pont-à-Mousson (7)
89.	US Beuveille (11)	1–3	CS&O Blénod-Pont-à-Mousson (7)
90.	ES Vallée de l'Othain (11)	0–8	AS Saulnes Longlaville (8)
91.	US Conflans (9)	0–3	US Jarny (8)
92.	AS Le Val-de-Guéblange (10)	0–1	ES Faulquemont-Créhange (9)
93.	EFT Sarrebourg (9)	1–3	US Valmont (8)
94.	US Saint-Jean-Rohrbach (11)	1–3	FC Dieuze (9)
95.	SR Gosselming (10)	3–2	FC Francaltroff (11)
96.	US Hilsprich (11)	2–0	USF Brouderdorff (10)
97.	Olympique Mittelbronn 04 (11)	0–9	AS Montigny-lès-Metz (7)
98.	ÉS Garrebourg (12)	0–7	EF Delme-Solgne (8)
99.	AS Rech (11)	1–5	FC Folschviller (9)
100.	US Bénestroff (10)	2–8	AS Réding (8)
101.	SS Hilbesheim (10)	1–5	AS Morhange (7)
102.	ES Macheren Petit-Ebersviller (9)	3–0 (Note: Tie won by means of forfeit.)	AS Bettborn Hellering (8)
103.	Montagnarde Walscheid (9)	1–5	RS Magny (7)
104.	US Soucht (8)	1–2	US Behren-lès-Forbach (8)
105.	Achen-Etting-Schmittviller (7)	0–3	US Thionville Lusitanos (7)
106.	US Rouhling (10)	2–2 (4–1 p)	AS Neunkirch (8)
107.	ES Gros Réderching-Bettviller (10)	0–3	FC Freyming (8)
108.	AS Montbronn (9)	1–0	CO Bouzonville (10)
109.	FC Hochwald (8)	3–2	FC Metzing (9)
110.	AS Kalhausen (10)	1–3	SSEP Hombourg-Haut (7)
111.	AS Anzeling Edling (11)	2–3	FC Coume (9)
112.	CS Diebling (9)	3–0	FC Rahling (10)
113.	AS Bliesbruck (8)	1–0	US Goetzenbruck-Meisenthal (8)
114.	SO Ippling (10)	4–1	FC Creutzberg Forbach (10)
115.	FC Verrerie-Sophie (11)	2–3	MJC Volmerange-lès-Boulay (8)
116.	ASJA Saint-Avold (11)	2–7	US Alsting-Zinzing (10)
117.	SO Merlebach (8)	1–2	USF Farébersviller (8)
118.	Flétrange SA (10)	0–1	AS Kerbach (10)
119.	Entente Schorbach Hottviller Volmunster 13 (11)	2–4	ES Wies-Woelf 93 (10)
120.	AS Falck (11)	0–3	CS Veymerange (7)
121.	US Bambiderstroff (11)	0–3	SR Creutzwald 03 (8)
122.	US Volkrange (10)	0–1	FC Hettange-Grande (7)
123.	US Illange (9)	1–2	US Cattenom (10)
124.	SC Terville (11)	2–2 (10–9 p)	FC Hayange (8)
125.	RC Nilvange (11)	1–1 (6–7 p)	RS Serémange-Erzange (10)
126.	US Guentrange (9)	0–4	US Fontoy (9)
127.	FC Yutz (7)	0–2	USAG Uckange (7)
128.	ASC Basse-Ham (9)	4–2	US Oudrenne (9)
129.	AS Florange-Ebange (10)	1–1 (4–2 p)	AS Algrange (8)
130.	ES Woippy (9)	8–1	ES Richemont (9)
131.	FC Devant-les-Ponts Metz (8)	2–3	US Châtel-Saint-Germain (9)
132.	FC Mondelange (10)	2–1	ES Marange-Silvange (8)
133.	ES Rosselange Vitry (8)	3–1	FC Guénange (9)
134.	JS Distroff (11)	0–13	ESAP Metz (7)
135.	ES Maizières (11)	1–4	ES Courcelles-sur-Nied (8)
136.	AS Volstroff (10)	1–1 (4–2 p)	Ars-sur-Moselle FC (11)
137.	SC Moulins-lès-Metz (10)	0–5	FC Hagondange (7)
138.	SC Marly (8)	0–0 (5–6 p)	Excelsior Cuvry (9)
139.	ES Fameck (7)	2–2 (2–4 p)	RS Amanvillers (7)
140.	CSJ Augny (11)	2–5	UL Rombas (8)
141.	AS Clouange (8)	3–4	AS Saint-Julien-lès-Metz (7)
142.	AS Talange (9)	5–0	FC Novéant (8)
143.	FC Verny-Louvigny-Cuvry (9)	3–4	ES Gandrange (7)
144.	JSO Ennery (11)	0–5	UL Plantières Metz (8)
145.	AS Wœrth (12)	0–1	FC Saint-Etienne Seltz (7)
146.	FC Riedseltz (10)	0–4	US Oberlauterbach (7)
147.	SS Brumath (10)	6–2	SC Rœschwoog (10)
148.	FC Weitbruch (10)	1–0	US Schleithal (9)
149.	FC Wissembourg/Altenstadt (12)	0–2	FR Sessenheim-Stattmatten (9)
150.	US Surbourg (12)	0–2	FC Herrlisheim (8)
151.	FC Oberhoffen (10)	1–1 (4–2 p)	Entente Mothern Munchhausen (9)
152.	AS Kurtzenhouse (11)	1–3	AS Hoerdt (8)
153.	SC Rittershoffen (11)	2–1	FC Durrenbach (9)
154.	FC Oberroedern/Aschbach (10)	1–6	FC Scheibenhard (8)
155.	AS Kilstett (11)	1–2	US Preuschdorf-Langensoultzbach (8)
156.	Entente Kaltenhouse/Marienthal (9)	5–2	FC Drusenheim (7)
157.	AS Gambsheim (9)	5–0	FC Geudertheim (9)
158.	AS Hunspach (8)	2–0	FC Steinseltz (7)
159.	AS Mertzwiller (9)	4–8	AS Betschdorf (8)
160.	US Wimmenau (11)	0–1	FC Keskastel (9)
161.	ES Rimling-Erching-Obergailbach (11)	2–2 (5–4 p)	AS Weyer (10)
162.	FC Steinbourg (12)	1–7	FC Saverne (8)
163.	AC Hinterfeld (11)	4–2	US Wittersheim (9)
164.	FA Val de Moder (10)	0–3	US Reipertswiller (7)
165.	AS Ingwiller/Menchhoffen (8)	3–1	AS Platania Gundershoffen (8)
166.	FC Ernolsheim-lès-Saverne (12)	1–3	ASI Avenir (8)
167.	AS Wingen-sur-Moder (12)	3–1	FC Eschbach (10)
168.	US Imbsheim (11)	0–2	AS Butten-Diemeringen (8)
169.	AS Rehthal (12)	8–0	AS Uhrwiller (10)
170.	FC Schwindratzheim (12)	1–4	Entente Trois Maisons-Phalsbourg (9)
171.	AS Weinbourg (11)	0–10	AS Ohlungen (8)
172.	US Ettendorf (10)	0–2	FC Schweighouse-sur-Moder (7)
173.	AS Hochfelden (8)	1–2	SC Drulingen (7)
174.	ASLC Berstett (13)	1–5	SC Red Star Strasbourg (10)
175.	US Ittenheim (7)	3–1	AS Mundolsheim (8)
176.	AS Espagnols Schiltigheim (12)	0–10 (Note: Match abandoned after 60 minutes, due to AS Espagnols Schiltigheim having less than 8 players remaining. FC Truchtersheim qualify.)	FC Truchtersheim (9)
177.	US Nordhouse (8)	5–1	FC Oberhausbergen (9)
178.	Internationale Meinau Académie (9)	1–2	ASL Robertsau (8)
179.	ES Pfettisheim (9)	2–2 (4–3 p)	AJF Hautepierre (10)
180.	CA Plobsheim (12)	0–1	AS Strasbourg (8)
181.	FC Eschau (9)	2–0	AP Joie et Santé Strasbourg (9)
182.	La Wantzenau FC (11)	1–2	EB Achenheim (8)
183.	US Eckwershiem (10)	2–2 (2–4 p)	FC Lampertheim (9)
184.	FC Eckbolsheim (8)	3–0	CS Neuhof Strasbourg (9)
185.	FC Ecrivains-Schiltigheim-Bischheim (10)	0–6	AS Elsau Portugais Strasbourg (7)
186.	ASC Blaesheim (13)	0–6	AS Menora Strasbourg (7)
187.	FC Lingolsheim (10)	1–5	FCO Strasbourg Koenigshoffen (7)
188.	FC Quatzenheim (12)	0–4	ASE Cité de l'Ill Strasbourg (10)
189.	ES Stotzheim (11)	1–0	FC Dangolsheim (12)
190.	AS Sermersheim (10)	1–4	FCSR Obernai (7)
191.	AS Saint-Pierre-Bois/Triembach-au-Val (10)	2–2 (3–1 p)	SR Zellwiller (11)
192.	AS Bergbieten (13)	3–2	CS Bernardswiller (11)
193.	ALFC Duttlenheim (8)	0–1	FC Rossfeld (7)
194.	FC Herbsheim (11)	0–1	USL Duppigheim (9)
195.	ASB Schirmeck-La Broque (9)	0–3	ES Molsheim-Ernolsheim (7)
196.	AS Portugais Barembach-Bruche (12)	0–5	US Scherwiller (9)
197.	AS Heiligenstein (12)	6–1	AS Altorf (12)
198.	SC Dinsheim (12)	7–0	ES Haslach-Urmatt (13)
199.	FC Krautergersheim (10)	0–2	UJ Epfig (9)
200.	Erno FC (13)	2–2 (4–2 p)	US Oberschaeffolsheim (8)
201.	US Dachstein (10)	1–1 (0–3 p)	FC Dahlenheim (8)
202.	FC Matzenheim (10)	1–1 (4–2 p)	FC Rhinau (8)
203.	AS Saint-Hippolyte (13)	0–1	FC Ingersheim (9)
204.	FR Jebsheim-Muntzenheim (10)	3–6	US Baldenheim (8)
205.	FC Ebersmunster (15)	0–3	AS Andolsheim (11)
206.	'AS Herrlisheim (13)	1–2	SR Kaysersberg (8)
207.	AS Portugais Sélestat (10)	6–3	FC Horbourg-Wihr (9)
208.	FC Grussenheim (10)	2–2 (2–3 p)	RC Kintzheim (9)
209.	AS Munster (8)	2–2 (4–5 p)	FC Sainte-Croix-en-Plaine (8)
210.	SR Widensolen (10)	2–4	FC Bennwihr (8)
211.	AS Turckheim (10)	0–3	FC Illhaeusern (8)
212.	AS Guémar (8)	2–4	AS Ribeauvillé (7)
213.	SC Sélestat (8)	2–0	Racing HW 96 (7)
214.	AS Schœnau (11)	8–1	US Sundhouse (11)
215.	FC Rouffach (8)	4–1	FC Kingersheim (9)
216.	AS Raedersheim (8)	1–2	AS Theodore Ruelisheim Wittenheim (9)
217.	FC Anatolie Mulhouse (10)	2–1	US Wittenheim (7)
218.	Cernay FC (8)	3–0	SC Ottmarsheim (7)
219.	US Bantzenheim Rumersheim (9)	1–1 (3–4 p)	FC Merxheim (9)
220.	FC Ensisheim (11)	4–2	FC Réguisheim (9)
221.	FC Sentheim (9)	0–0 (5–3 p)	SR Saint-Amarin (9)
222.	FC Oberhergheim (12)	2–2 (3–4 p)	AS Blanc Vieux-Thann (8)
223.	ASCA Wittelsheim (10)	3–0	FC Munchhouse (10)
224.	FCRS Richwiller (8)	2–3	AS Berrwiller-Hartsmannswiller (7)
225.	Thann FC 2017 (11)	3–6	AGIIR Florival (7)
226.	AS Durlinsdorf (11)	0–1	FC Burnhaupt-le-Haut (7)
227.	FC Traubach (10)	2–2 (4–5 p)	AS Huningue (7)
228.	FC Uffheim (8)	3–1	FC Habsheim (8)
229.	CS Mulhouse Bourtzwiller (9)	1–1 (4–2 p)	FC Kappelen (10)
230.	Étoile Mulhouse (11)	1–2	US Hirsingue (8)
231.	Entente Grentzingen-Bettendorf (11)	5–2	FC Seppois-Bisel (9)
232.	Real ASPTT Mulhouse CF (8)	5–5 (3–4 p)	FC Hagenthal-Wentzwiller (9)
233.	Saint-Georges Carspach (13)	0–2	FC Brunstatt (8)
234.	FC Sausheim (9)	5–3	FC Riedisheim (8)
235.	SS Zillisheim (8)	3–3 (5–4 p)	FC Morschwiller-le-Bas (8)
236.	Mouloudia Mulhouse (8)	4–0	FC Bartenheim (7)
237.	AS Hausgauen (12)	0–4	RC Dannemarie (9)
238.	US Azzurri Mulhouse (10)	0–5	ASL Kœtzingue (7)
239.	Entente Hagenbach-Balschwiller (9)	0–6	AS Blotzheim (7)
240.	FC Pays Rhénan (7)	1–3	AS Altkirch (8)

=== Third round ===
These matches were played on 18 and 19 September 2021, with two postponed until 26 September 2021.

Third round results: Grand Est
Tie no	Home team (tier)	Score	Away team (tier)
1.	SL Pontfaverger (10)	1–5	Rethel SF (6)
2.	FCF La Neuvillette-Jamin (8)	6–2	AS Val de l'Aisne (8)
3.	Floing FC (9)	0–3	Cheveuges-Saint-Aignan CO (10)
4.	US Bazeilles (8)	0–0 (5–6 p)	Olympique Charleville Neufmanil Aiglemont (8)
5.	US Revin (8)	0–3	FC Bogny (6)
6.	Cormontreuil FC (6)	1–2	AS Cernay-Berru-Lavannes (7)
7.	AS Asfeld (7)	3–1	FC Blagny-Carignan (7)
8.	AS Tournes/Renwez/Les Mazures/Arreux/Montcornet (7)	1–2	AS Prix-lès-Mézières (5)
9.	CA Villers-Semeuse (7)	0–0 (4–3 p)	USA Le Chesne (7)
10.	EF Reims Sainte-Anne Châtillons (6)	3–0	Le Theux FC (7)
11.	AS Tertre (9)	1–1 (2–4 p)	Châlons FCO (7)
12.	AS Taissy (8)	1–4	RCS La Chapelle (6)
13.	FC Épernay (7)	0–3	RC Épernay Champagne (5)
14.	FC Morgendois (10)	2–3	US Avize-Grauves (6)
15.	ASPTT Châlons (7)	1–5	FC Métropole Troyenne (6)
16.	Foyer Compertrix (9)	0–0 (4–5 p)	FC Côte des Blancs (7)
17.	Vitry FC (8)	0–4	FC Saint-Meziery (6)
18.	US Oiry (8)	0–2	FC Nogentais (6)
19.	AS Chartreux (9)	1–3	ES Fagnières (8)
20.	Reims Murigny Franco Portugais (9)	2–3	FC Christo (7)
21.	Foyer Barsequanais (7)	3–5	Espérance Saint-Dizier (8)
22.	US Biesles (9)	1–3	USI Blaise (6)
23.	CO Langres (10)	2–1	ES Andelot-Rimaucourt-Bourdons (8)
24.	Bar-sur-Aube FC (8)	2–1	SC Marnaval (6)
25.	JS Saint-Julien FC (8)	1–4	Chaumont FC (6)
26.	FC Prez Bourmont (9)	4–2	US Éclaron (6)
27.	US Wassy Brousseval (9)	1–3	Stade Chevillonnais (7)
28.	FC Saints-Geosmois (7)	0–2	Alliance Sud-Ouest Football Aubois (8)
29.	FC Joinville-Vecqueville (8)	2–1	FC Nord Est Aubois (8)
30.	ES Celles-Essoyes (10)	0–0 (4–1 p)	AS Sarrey-Montigny (6)
31.	FC Saint-Max-Essey (7)	1–0	AC Blainville-Damelevières (7)
32.	Entente Centre Ornain (8)	4–1	AS Tréveray (9)
33.	COS Villers (7)	1–2	FC Pulnoy (7)
34.	AS Ludres (8)	2–3	ES Thaon (5)
35.	GS Vézelise (11)	0–6	Entente Sorcy Void-Vacon (7)
36.	ES Laneuveville (9)	2–4	US Behonne-Longeville-en-Barois (9)
37.	AS Gondreville (8)	0–7	US Vandœuvre (6)
38.	Jarville JF (6)	0–0 (4–5 p)	Bar-le-Duc FC (6)
39.	Toul JCA (8)	2–1	SC Malzéville (9)
40.	AS MJC Blâmont (11)	2–4	AS Haut-du-Lièvre Nancy (8)
41.	AS Girancourt-Dommartin-Chaumousey (8)	0–5	US Raon-l'Étape (5)
42.	FC Remiremont Saint-Étienne (8)	1–2	AS Saint-Nabord (8)
43.	FC Amerey Xertigny (9)	0–2	SM Bruyères (10)
44.	CS Charmes (9)	0–4	SR Saint-Dié (7)
45.	FC Éloyes (8)	2–2 (2–1 p)	FC Sainte-Marguerite (8)
46.	SC Baccarat (10)	0–1	ES Heillecourt (7)
47.	FC Neufchâteau-Liffol (10)	0–6	GS Haroué-Benney (7)
48.	RC Corcieux (12)	1–13	GS Neuves-Maisons (7)
49.	JS Châtenois (12)	1–8	ES Golbey (6)
50.	US Lamarche (10)	0–8	FC Lunéville (6)
51.	AF Laxou Sapinière (7)	2–1	RS Amanvillers (7)
52.	ESAP Metz (7)	2–1	US Pagny-sur-Moselle (6)
53.	FC Dieulouard (9)	0–1	GS Thiaucourt (10)
54.	CS&O Blénod-Pont-à-Mousson (7)	0–2	FC Pont-à-Mousson (7)
55.	ES Courcelles-sur-Nied (8)	2–1	ES Woippy (9)
56.	ENJ Val-de-Seille (9)	0–1	RC Champigneulles (6)
57.	Excelsior Cuvry (9)	0–0 (3–4 p)	US Jarny (8)
58.	US Châtel-Saint-Germain (9)	0–3	APM Metz (6)
59.	US Etain-Buzy (7)	5–3	Entente Vigneulles-Hannonville-Fresne (8)
60.	US Batilly (9)	1–3	AS Talange (9)
61.	UL Rombas (8)	3–1	US Fontoy (9)
62.	USAG Uckange (7)	3–1	ES Rosselange Vitry (8)
63.	AS Florange-Ebange (10)	3–1	Association Saint-Laurent-Mangiennes (10)
64.	FC Hagondange (7)	1–0	FC Bassin Piennois (6)
65.	UL Plantières Metz (8)	6–2	ES Villerupt-Thil (6)
66.	SC Terville (11)	0–9	ES Gandrange (7)
67.	RS Serémange-Erzange (10)	0–5	FC Hettange-Grande (7)
68.	AS Œutrange (12)	1–8	Val de l'Orne FC (7)
69.	FC Mondelange (10)	0–3	CSO Amnéville (5)
70.	AS Saulnes Longlaville (8)	1–1 (7–8 p)	AS Saint-Julien-lès-Metz (7)
71.	US Hilsprich (11)	0–4	ES Macheren Petit-Ebersviller (9)
72.	ES Faulquemont-Créhange (9)	1–1 (6–7 p)	MJC Volmerange-lès-Boulay (8)
73.	AS Montigny-lès-Metz (7)	0–3	FC Sarrebourg (6)
74.	AS Volstroff (10)	1–5	RS Magny (7)
75.	US Cattenom (10)	0–2	US Valmont (8)
76.	EF Delme-Solgne (8)	1–2	FC Trémery (6)
77.	AS Réding (8)	5–0	ASC Basse-Ham (9)
78.	FC Folschviller (9)	0–0 (1–3 p)	AS Morhange (7)
79.	FC Coume (9)	2–0	SR Gosselming (10)
80.	FC Dieuze (9)	0–5	CA Boulay (6)
81.	US Alsting-Zinzing (10)	1–5	SSEP Hombourg-Haut (7)
82.	US Forbach (6)	2–2 (3–4 p)	US Nousseviller (6)
83.	FC Freyming (8)	2–0	USF Farébersviller (8)
84.	US Rouhling (10)	2–0	CS Diebling (9)
85.	SR Creutzwald 03 (8)	2–2 (2–4 p)	AS Bliesbruck (8)
86.	ES Wies-Woelf 93 (10)	0–2	US Behren-lès-Forbach (8)
87.	AS Kerbach (10)	0–0 (2–3 p)	SO Ippling (10)
88.	ES Rimling-Erching-Obergailbach (11)	0–1	Sarreguemines FC (6)
89.	US Thionville Lusitanos (7)	5–0	CS Veymerange (7)
90.	FC Hochwald (8)	1–6	Étoile Naborienne Saint-Avold (6)
91.	AC Hinterfeld (11)	3–3 (4–2 p)	ASI Avenir (8)
92.	AS Butten-Diemeringen (8)	2–2 (4–2 p)	AS Betschdorf (8)
93.	FC Scheibenhard (8)	3–0	Entente Trois Maisons-Phalsbourg (9)
94.	AS Rehthal (12)	0–3	FC Obermodern (6)
95.	US Oberlauterbach (7)	1–5	US Sarre-Union (5)
96.	SC Drulingen (7)	0–0 (3–5 p)	AS Hunspach (8)
97.	US Preuschdorf-Langensoultzbach (8)	0–3	AS Ingwiller/Menchhoffen (8)
98.	AS Wingen-sur-Moder (12)	1–4	SC Rittershoffen (11)
99.	FC Keskastel (9)	0–8	US Reipertswiller (7)
100.	AS Montbronn (9)	2–1	FC Saint-Etienne Seltz (7)
101.	FC Weitbruch (10)	2–0	FC Schweighouse-sur-Moder (7)
102.	FR Sessenheim-Stattmatten (9)	0–4	AS Gambsheim (9)
103.	SS Brumath (10)	5–2	FC Saverne (8)
104.	SS Weyersheim (6)	2–6	FCO Strasbourg Koenigshoffen (7)
105.	AS Menora Strasbourg (7)	3–2	FCE Schirrhein (6)
106.	FC Herrlisheim (8)	3–0	FC Truchtersheim (9)
107.	AS Strasbourg (8)	1–5	ES Pfettisheim (9)
108.	Entente Kaltenhouse/Marienthal (9)	1–5	FC Soleil Bischheim (6)
109.	FC Oberhoffen (10)	0–7	FA Illkirch Graffenstaden (5)
110.	AS Hoerdt (8)	1–1 (4–5 p)	AS Ohlungen (8)
111.	ES Molsheim-Ernolsheim (7)	1–0	FC Dahlenheim (8)
112.	US Ittenheim (7)	1–2	ASPV Strasbourg (6)
113.	ASL Robertsau (8)	6–1	FC Eckbolsheim (8)
114.	SC Dinsheim (12)	1–5	FC Kronenbourg Strasbourg (6)
115.	FC Eschau (9)	0–5	FC Geispolsheim 01 (6)
116.	Erno FC (13)	1–2	USL Duppigheim (9)
117.	FC Lampertheim (9)	1–4	AS Elsau Portugais Strasbourg (7)
118.	SC Red Star Strasbourg (10)	0–8	Stadium Racing Colmar (5)
119.	AS Bergbieten (13)	0–2	EB Achenheim (8)
120.	ASE Cité de l'Ill Strasbourg (10)	8–2	US Nordhouse (8)
121.	RC Kintzheim (9)	0–0 (3–2 p)	US Baldenheim (8)
122.	SC Sélestat (8)	3–3 (3–2 p)	US Scherwiller (9)
123.	FC Matzenheim (10)	0–3	FC Still 1930 (6)
124.	AS Portugais Sélestat (10)	1–0	AS Saint-Pierre-Bois/Triembach-au-Val (10)
125.	ES Stotzheim (11)	3–3 (5–4 p)	UJ Epfig (9)
126.	AS Erstein (6)	0–3	ASC Biesheim (5)
127.	AS Schœnau (11)	2–2 (4–3 p)	AS Heiligenstein (12)
128.	FC Rossfeld (7)	0–0 (6–5 p)	FCSR Obernai (7)
129.	FC Rouffach (8)	0–2	FC Mulhouse (5)
130.	AS Illzach Modenheim (6)	4–1	AS Sundhoffen (6)
131.	AS Andolsheim (11)	1–14	AS Ribeauvillé (7)
132.	FC Ensisheim (11)	2–5	Cernay FC (8)
133.	SR Kaysersberg (8)	3–2	FC Ingersheim (9)
134.	AS Berrwiller-Hartsmannswiller (7)	2–3	AGIIR Florival (7)
135.	FC Illhaeusern (8)	2–0	FC Sainte-Croix-en-Plaine (8)
136.	FC Merxheim (9)	2–0	FC Sentheim (9)
137.	FC Bennwihr (8)	4–1	AS Blanc Vieux-Thann (8)
138.	FC Brunstatt (8)	1–2	FC Hagenthal-Wentzwiller (9)
139.	ASCA Wittelsheim (10)	0–7	FC Saint-Louis Neuweg (5)
140.	US Hirsingue (8)	3–4	ASL Kœtzingue (7)
141.	FC Burnhaupt-le-Haut (7)	0–3	FC Hégenheim (6)
142.	AS Altkirch (8)	1–2	Mouloudia Mulhouse (8)
143.	FC Sausheim (9)	0–0 (4–5 p)	CS Mulhouse Bourtzwiller (9)
144.	SS Zillisheim (8)	2–0	FC Uffheim (8)
145.	AS Theodore Ruelisheim Wittenheim (9)	2–2 (7–6 p)	RC Dannemarie (9)
146.	Entente Grentzingen-Bettendorf (11)	1–5	AS Huningue (7)
147.	FC Anatolie Mulhouse (10)	1–4	AS Blotzheim (7)

=== Fourth round ===
These matches were played on 2 and 3 October 2021.

Fourth round results: Grand Est
Tie no	Home team (tier)	Score	Away team (tier)
1.	FC Côte des Blancs (7)	0–3	US Avize-Grauves (6)
2.	FC Bogny (6)	0–2	AS Prix-lès-Mézières (5)
3.	FCF La Neuvillette-Jamin (8)	2–2 (4–3 p)	Rethel SF (6)
4.	AS Cernay-Berru-Lavannes (7)	0–3	CA Villers-Semeuse (7)
5.	Cheveuges-Saint-Aignan CO (10)	0–7	EF Reims Sainte-Anne Châtillons (6)
6.	FC Christo (7)	3–2	AS Asfeld (7)
7.	ES Fagnières (8)	3–1	Olympique Charleville Neufmanil Aiglemont (8)
8.	RC Épernay Champagne (5)	3–0	USI Blaise (6)
9.	FC Prez Bourmont (9)	3–3 (4–2 p)	Châlons FCO (7)
10.	FC Métropole Troyenne (6)	1–2	RCS La Chapelle (6)
11.	ES Celles-Essoyes (10)	0–7	Chaumont FC (6)
12.	CO Langres (10)	0–3	Espérance Saint-Dizier (8)
13.	FC Joinville-Vecqueville (8)	4–2	FC Saint-Meziery (6)
14.	Alliance Sud-Ouest Football Aubois (8)	4–2	Bar-sur-Aube FC (8)
15.	Stade Chevillonnais (7)	0–5	FC Nogentais (6)
16.	GS Thiaucourt (10)	2–0	SM Bruyères (10)
17.	US Behonne-Longeville-en-Barois (9)	1–2	ES Heillecourt (7)
18.	FC Lunéville (6)	4–1	Bar-le-Duc FC (6)
19.	FC Éloyes (8)	4–2	Entente Centre Ornain (8)
20.	Toul JCA (8)	0–0 (4–2 p)	FC Saint-Max-Essey (7)
21.	SR Saint-Dié (7)	0–4	US Raon-l'Étape (5)
22.	ES Golbey (6)	1–0	Entente Sorcy Void-Vacon (7)
23.	AS Saint-Nabord (8)	0–1	ES Thaon (5)
24.	GS Neuves-Maisons (7)	4–2	FC Pulnoy (7)
25.	AS Haut-du-Lièvre Nancy (8)	3–1	GS Haroué-Benney (7)
26.	RC Champigneulles (6)	2–0	FC Hettange-Grande (7)
27.	FC Trémery (6)	0–4	SAS Épinal (4)
28.	ES Courcelles-sur-Nied (8)	2–0	CA Boulay (6)
29.	ESAP Metz (7)	4–2	US Etain-Buzy (7)
30.	US Vandœuvre (6)	4–0	AF Laxou Sapinière (7)
31.	US Jarny (8)	4–1	MJC Volmerange-lès-Boulay (8)
32.	AS Talange (9)	2–2 (4–3 p)	FC Pont-à-Mousson (7)
33.	Val de l'Orne FC (7)	0–1	UL Rombas (8)
34.	AS Florange-Ebange (10)	1–3	UL Plantières Metz (8)
35.	FC Coume (9)	1–2	APM Metz (6)
36.	USAG Uckange (7)	0–3	US Thionville Lusitanos (7)
37.	FC Sarrebourg (6)	2–1	CSO Amnéville (5)
38.	SO Ippling (10)	2–4	ES Gandrange (7)
39.	AS Réding (8)	2–1	Sarreguemines FC (6)
40.	SSEP Hombourg-Haut (7)	3–1	US Nousseviller (6)
41.	AS Morhange (7)	2–0	Étoile Naborienne Saint-Avold (6)
42.	AS Saint-Julien-lès-Metz (7)	2–0	FC Freyming (8)
43.	US Valmont (8)	2–3	AS Montbronn (9)
44.	AS Bliesbruck (8)	1–1 (3–2 p)	FC Hagondange (7)
45.	ES Macheren Petit-Ebersviller (9)	0–5	RS Magny (7)
46.	US Rouhling (10)	1–4	US Behren-lès-Forbach (8)
47.	AS Gambsheim (9)	1–4	FCO Strasbourg Koenigshoffen (7)
48.	SC Rittershoffen (11)	1–4	FC Soleil Bischheim (6)
49.	AS Hunspach (8)	0–4	FCSR Haguenau (4)
50.	AS Menora Strasbourg (7)	0–0 (6–7 p)	FA Illkirch Graffenstaden (5)
51.	AC Hinterfeld (11)	1–0	FC Herrlisheim (8)
52.	SS Brumath (10)	1–3	US Sarre-Union (5)
53.	US Reipertswiller (7)	2–1	AS Butten-Diemeringen (8)
54.	ES Pfettisheim (9)	2–0	FC Weitbruch (10)
55.	AS Ohlungen (8)	1–4	FC Obermodern (6)
56.	AS Ingwiller/Menchhoffen (8)	2–1	FC Scheibenhard (8)
57.	AS Portugais Sélestat (10)	1–0	ES Stotzheim (11)
58.	ASL Robertsau (8)	1–4	Stadium Racing Colmar (5)
59.	EB Achenheim (8)	1–4	FC Still 1930 (6)
60.	FC Rossfeld (7)	2–0	SC Sélestat (8)
61.	AS Schœnau (11)	0–1	AS Ribeauvillé (7)
62.	FC Geispolsheim 01 (6)	1–1 (4–5 p)	ES Molsheim-Ernolsheim (7)
63.	ASE Cité de l'Ill Strasbourg (10)	0–4	ASC Biesheim (5)
64.	AS Elsau Portugais Strasbourg (7)	0–1	SC Schiltigheim (4)
65.	USL Duppigheim (9)	2–3	FC Kronenbourg Strasbourg (6)
66.	Cernay FC (8)	0–4	FC Mulhouse (5)
67.	AS Blotzheim (7)	1–2	FC Hégenheim (6)
68.	AGIIR Florival (7)	2–1	SR Kaysersberg (8)
69.	CS Mulhouse Bourtzwiller (9)	3–5	FC Hagenthal-Wentzwiller (9)
70.	AS Theodore Ruelisheim Wittenheim (9)	1–4	AS Illzach Modenheim (6)
71.	FC Illhaeusern (8)	2–2 (0–3 p)	RC Kintzheim (9)
72.	ASPV Strasbourg (6)	1–1 (1–4 p)	ASL Kœtzingue (7)
73.	Mouloudia Mulhouse (8)	1–1 (7–6 p)	SS Zillisheim (8)
74.	FC Bennwihr (8)	0–3	FC Saint-Louis Neuweg (5)
75.	FC Merxheim (9)	1–2	AS Huningue (7)

=== Fifth round ===
These matches were played on 17 October 2021.

Fifth round results: Grand Est
Tie no	Home team (tier)	Score	Away team (tier)
1.	US Thionville Lusitanos (7)	2–1	AS Prix-lès-Mézières (5)
2.	Espérance Saint-Dizier (8)	0–2	FC Nogentais (6)
3.	CA Villers-Semeuse (7)	2–2 (3–1 p)	RCS La Chapelle (6)
4.	RS Magny (7)	4–1	FC Joinville-Vecqueville (8)
5.	RC Épernay Champagne (5)	2–3	CS Sedan Ardennes (3)
6.	ES Fagnières (8)	0–1	FC Christo (7)
7.	FC Prez Bourmont (9)	2–3	FCF La Neuvillette-Jamin (8)
8.	US Avize-Grauves (6)	0–2	EF Reims Sainte-Anne Châtillons (6)
9.	Alliance Sud-Ouest Football Aubois (8)	2–4	Chaumont FC (6)
10.	UL Rombas (8)	0–0 (3–5 p)	APM Metz (6)
11.	FC Éloyes (8)	3–1	ES Courcelles-sur-Nied (8)
12.	ES Thaon (5)	4–2	US Vandœuvre (6)
13.	AS Haut-du-Lièvre Nancy (8)	3–1	US Jarny (8)
14.	UL Plantières Metz (8)	2–1	ESAP Metz (7)
15.	AS Talange (9)	0–2	RC Champigneulles (6)
16.	GS Neuves-Maisons (7)	1–0	Toul JCA (8)
17.	FC Lunéville (6)	1–3	SAS Épinal (4)
18.	ES Heillecourt (7)	1–2	US Raon-l'Étape (5)
19.	GS Thiaucourt (10)	2–4	ES Gandrange (7)
20.	AS Saint-Julien-lès-Metz (7)	0–3	AS Morhange (7)
21.	ES Pfettisheim (9)	2–3	FC Sarrebourg (6)
22.	US Reipertswiller (7)	1–1 (3–4 p)	FA Illkirch Graffenstaden (5)
23.	AS Bliesbruck (8)	2–3	ASC Biesheim (5)
24.	FCSR Haguenau (4)	0–2	US Sarre-Union (5)
25.	FC Still 1930 (6)	4–5	FCO Strasbourg Koenigshoffen (7)
26.	AS Ingwiller/Menchhoffen (8)	2–2 (1–4 p)	FC Obermodern (6)
27.	FC Soleil Bischheim (6)	2–2 (4–2 p)	SSEP Hombourg-Haut (7)
28.	US Behren-lès-Forbach (8)	6–0	AS Montbronn (9)
29.	AC Hinterfeld (11)	1–1 (5–6 p)	AS Réding (8)
30.	RC Kintzheim (9)	2–3	ASL Kœtzingue (7)
31.	AS Portugais Sélestat (10)	0–10	ES Molsheim-Ernolsheim (7)
32.	AS Ribeauvillé (7)	0–2	FC Rossfeld (7)
33.	Stadium Racing Colmar (5)	0–2	SC Schiltigheim (4)
34.	AS Illzach Modenheim (6)	3–0	AGIIR Florival (7)
35.	FC Saint-Louis Neuweg (5)	5–0	ES Golbey (6)
36.	FC Hagenthal-Wentzwiller (9)	1–1 (4–3 p)	Mouloudia Mulhouse (8)
37.	AS Huningue (7)	2–0	FC Hégenheim (6)
38.	FC Mulhouse (5)	3–1	FC Kronenbourg Strasbourg (6)

=== Sixth round ===
These matches were played on 30 and 31 October 2021.

Sixth round results: Grand Est
Tie no	Home team (tier)	Score	Away team (tier)
1.	FC Christo (7)	0–5	FC Éloyes (8)
2.	Chaumont FC (6)	1–3	RS Magny (7)
3.	US Raon-l'Étape (5)	1–2	EF Reims Sainte-Anne Châtillons (6)
4.	AS Morhange (7)	0–0 (13–12 p)	ES Gandrange (7)
5.	FCF La Neuvillette-Jamin (8)	0–9	RC Champigneulles (6)
6.	CS Sedan Ardennes (3)	2–2 (4–3 p)	SAS Épinal (4)
7.	GS Neuves-Maisons (7)	0–2	ES Thaon (5)
8.	UL Plantières Metz (8)	2–1	AS Haut-du-Lièvre Nancy (8)
9.	APM Metz (6)	0–2 (Note: Tie reversed from original draw.)	US Thionville Lusitanos (7)
10.	FC Nogentais (6)	3–2	CA Villers-Semeuse (7)
11.	FC Rossfeld (7)	0–1	US Sarre-Union (5)
12.	AS Huningue (7)	2–3	FC Soleil Bischheim (6)
13.	AS Réding (8)	0–9	SC Schiltigheim (4)
14.	ES Molsheim-Ernolsheim (7)	0–0 (5–4 p)	US Behren-lès-Forbach (8)
15.	FCO Strasbourg Koenigshoffen (7)	1–1 (0–3 p)	AS Illzach Modenheim (6)
16.	FC Hagenthal-Wentzwiller (9)	0–2	FC Mulhouse (5)
17.	FC Sarrebourg (6)	1–1 (5–4 p)	FC Saint-Louis Neuweg (5)
18.	ASL Kœtzingue (7)	0–0 (4–2 p)	FC Obermodern (6)
19.	ASC Biesheim (5)	1–1 (5–4 p)	FA Illkirch Graffenstaden (5)
