= Louis Dunière =

Canadian politician

Louis Dunière (May 7, 1723 – May 31, 1806) was a businessman and political figure in Lower Canada.

He was born at Quebec City in 1723, the son of a merchant born in France. He purchased land, managed the seigneury of Bellechasse and was also involved in the grain trade. Dunière was named a captain in the local militia in 1775 and took part in the defense of the town against the Americans. He was granted fishing rights off the coast of Labrador to take cod, salmon and seals. He acquired a warehouse and wharf at Quebec and was also involved for a short time in shipbuilding. He helped found the Agriculture Society of the District of Quebec in 1789. Like others in the colony, Dunière lobbied the British authorities for representative government. In 1792, he was elected to the 1st Parliament of Lower Canada for Hertford. Dunière proposed Jean-Antoine Panet as speaker for the legislative assembly; Panet was chosen as speaker despite the opposition of some British members of the assembly. Dunière's son Louis-François was elected to represent the county in the 1796 election and nominated Panet as speaker.

He died at Berthier in 1806.
