= Louis-François Dunière =

Canadian politician

Louis-François Dunière (July 11, 1754 – August 29, 1828) was a businessman and political figure in Lower Canada.

He was born in the town of Quebec in 1754, the son of Louis Dunière. Dunière was elected to the Legislative Assembly of Lower Canada for Hertford in 1796, after his father retired from politics. As his father had in the 1792 assembly, Louis-François proposed Jean-Antoine Panet as speaker. Dunière settled at Berthier. He was a justice of the peace and served as major in the local militia during the War of 1812.

He died in Pointe-du-Lac in 1828.
