= Cédric Elzéard =

French footballer and manager (born 1975)

Personal information
- Date of birth: 1 April 1975 (age 51)
- Place of birth: Enghien-les-Bains, France
- Height: 1.73 m (5 ft 8 in)
- Position: Defender

Team information
- Current team: Prix-lès-Mézières (manager)

Youth career
- Conflans FC
- Paris Saint-Germain

Senior career*
Years	Team	Apps	(Gls)
1992–1994	Paris Saint-Germain B		
1994–1995	Saint-Leu		
1995–1996	Amiens	4	(0)
1996–2004	Sedan	122+ (Note: Statistics are missing for the 1996–97 and 1997–98 seasons.)	(1+)
2004–2006	Brest	54	(1)
2006–2007	Créteil	9	(0)
2007	Créteil B		

Managerial career
- 2019: Prix-lès-Mézières
- 2021–: Prix-lès-Mézières
- * Club domestic league appearances and goals

Cédric Elzéard (born 1 April 1975) is a French professional football manager and former player who played as a defender. As of the 2021–22 season, he is the head coach of Championnat National 3 club Prix-lès-Mézières.

== Honours ==
Sedan

- Coupe de France runner-up: 1998–99
