= AS Prix-lès-Mézières =

French football club

- Full name: Association Sportive de Prix-lès-Mézières
- Founded: 1948
- Ground: Stade de la Poterie, Prix-lès-Mézières
- Capacity: 2,000
- Chairman: Jerry Zucarri
- Manager: Cédric Elzéard
- League: National 3 Group I
- 2022–23: National 3 Group F, 4th
- Website: https://www.asprixlesmezieres.fr/
Home colours	Away colours

Association Sportive de Prix-lès-Mézières (French pronunciation: [asɔsjɑsjɔ̃ spɔʁtiv də pʁi lɛ mezjɛʁ]; commonly referred to as AS Prix-lès-Mézières) is a French football club based in Prix-lès-Mézières in the Champagne-Ardenne region. The club was founded on 24 July 1948 and currently plays in the Championnat National 3, the fifth tier of French football, after being promoted in 2019.

== Managers ==
- -2016 : (France) Sami Smaïli
- 2016-2017 : (France) Farid Fouzari
- 2017-01/2018 : (France) Teddy Pellerin
- 01/2018-06/2018 : (France) Éric Luczkow
- 2018-2021: (France) Laurent Billard
- 2021–present: (France) Cédric Elzéard
