= 2023–24 Coupe de France preliminary rounds, Grand Est =

French football competition

The 2023–24 Coupe de France preliminary rounds, Grand Est is the qualifying competition to decide which teams from the leagues of the Grand Est region of France take part in the main competition from the seventh round.

A total of twenty teams will qualify from the Grand Est section of the 2023–24 Coupe de France preliminary rounds.

In 2022–23, ES Thaon and FCO Strasbourg Koenigshoffen 06 progressed furthest in the competition, reaching the round of 32. The tier six side from Strasbourg were one of the last two remaining sides in the competition from outside the national league structure, but were eventually knocked out by a single goal against Ligue 1 side Angers in front of more than 18,000 fans at Stade de la Meinau. Thaon lost on penalties to defending champions Nantes after a goal-less tie.

== Draws and fixtures ==
On 24 July 2023, the league published the details of the dates and number of fixtures for the rounds under their organisation. A total of 935 entered from the region, with district level teams and 44 Régional 3 teams entering at the first round stage, making up a total of 360 fixtures. The remaining Régional 3 and all Régional 2 teams (a total of 160 teams) would enter at the second round stage. Régional 1 teams and Championnat National 3 teams (a total of 46 teams) would enter at the third round stage. Three Championnat National 2 would enter at the fourth round stage, and two Championnat National teams would enter at the fifth round stage.

The first round draw was published on 27 July 2023. The second round draw was published on 24 August 2023. The third round draw was published on 5 September 2023. The fourth round draw, which took place on 19 September 2023, was published in separate parts for the East, Central and West sectors. The fifth round draw was published on 4 October 2023. The sixth and final regional round was drawn on 18 October 2023.

=== First round ===
These matches were played between 18 and 24 August 2023.

First Round Results: Grand Est
Tie no	Home team (Tier)	Score	Away team (Tier)
1.	SC Vivarois (10)	1–0	FC Haybes (10)
2.	Nord Ardennes (9)	3–0	US Revin (8)
3.	FC Rimogne (11)	7–1	FC Rouvroy Thin (12)
4.	EM Charleville-Mézières (10)	4–3	Liart-Signy FC (8)
5.	AS Franco-Turque Charleville-Mézières (9)	3–4	ES Charleville-Mézières (8)
6.	ES Auvillers/Signy-le-Petit (10)	0–1	CA Monthermé (10)
7.	Aubrives FC (11)	0–1	AS Ville-de-Lumes (11)
8.	US Fumay-Charnois (10)	0–2	Joyeuse de Warcq (11)
9.	AS Bourg-Rocroi (9)	8–1	Entente de la Vaux (10)
10.	JS Remilly Aillicourt (12)	1–1 (1–4 p)	ES Saulces-Monclin (9)
11.	FC Porcien (8)	2–1	QV Douzy (9)
12.	Floing FC (12)	0–3 (Note: Tie won by means of forfeit.)	US Flize (10)
13.	US Saint-Menges (10)	3–9	US Machault (11)
14.	FC Pouru Saint-Rémy (12)	8–4	AS Sault-lès-Rethel (11)
15.	FC Puilly Entente des Pays d'Yvois (12)	0–4	USC Nouvion-sur-Meuse (9)
16.	FC Pixien (11)	2–5	Olympique Torcy-Sedan (9)
17.	FC Launois (11)	0–3	SOS Buzancy (10)
18.	ASR Raucourt (11)	6–5	AS Grandpré (11)
19.	AS Mouzon (10)	3–3 (5–3 p)	USA Le Chesne (8)
20.	US Balan (11)	1–2	AS Monthois' (11)
21.	Cheveuges-Saint-Aignan CO (9)	2–0	AS Boulzicourt (9)
22.	AS Saint-Brice-Courcelles (9)	2–1	US Fismes Ardre et Vesle (8)
23.	ES Witry-les-Reims (9)	3–0	Entente Rémoise (10)
24.	AS Mourmelon Livry Bouy (10)	4–0	SC Montmirail (10)
25.	ES Côteaux Sud (10)	4–5	Nord Champagne FC (8)
26.	Reims Athletic FC (11)	4–2	SC Dormans (10)
27.	SL Pontfaverger (10)	2–2 (2–4 p)	AS Gueux (10)
28.	ES Gaye (12)	1–3	FC Vallée de la Suippe (10)
29.	FC Saint-Martin-sur-le-Pré/La Veuve/Recy (10)	6–0 (Note: Tie reversed from original draw.)	ES Pleurs (12)
30.	FC Bezannes 2050 (11)	0–4	ES Muizonnaise (11)
31.	US Esternay (9)	2–3	AS Taissy (9)
32.	Entente Étoges-Vert (11)	2–1	FC Prunay (11)
33.	AS Heiltz-le-Maurupt (11)	2–1	AS Marolles (11)
34.	Foyer de Soudron (12)	1–6	AS Loisy-sur-Marne (10)
35.	USS Sermaize (10)	3–0	US Couvrot (10)
36.	AS Maurupt-le-Montois (10)	0–1	Entente Châtelraould/Les Rivières-Henruel/Bignicourt-sur-Marne (10)
37.	Argonne FC (10)	0–2	CS Agéen (8)
38.	Saint-Memmie FC (11)	2–1	FC Heiltz l’Évêque (12)
39.	FC Haute Borne (10)	1–2	Entente Somsois Margerie Saint-Utin (10)
40.	FC Épernay (9)	0–3	AS Courtisols ESTAN (10)
41.	SC Viennois (11)	0–5	US Oiry (9)
42.	FC Bignicourier (11)	2–7	AS Cheminon (9)
43.	UCS Nogentaise (11)	1–1 (4–3 p)	US Chaource (11)
44.	Torvilliers AC (9)	4–5	US Vendeuvre (9)
45.	FC Morgendois (9)	3–1	ES Municipaux Troyes (8)
46.	Romilly Champagne FC (9)	3–0	FC Nord Est Aubois (9)
47.	FC Tertre (11)	0–3	ES Nord Aubois (8)
48.	Ervy FC (10)	2–5	ESC Melda (9)
49.	SC Savières (10)	1–2	FC Essoyes (9)
50.	AS Portugaise Nogent-sur-Seine (11)	1–3	JS Vaudoise (8)
51.	AS Pont-Saint-Marie (10)	6–3	Rosières Omnisports (8)
52.	Étoile Chapelaine (10)	4–4 (5–3 p)	FC Trainel (9)
53.	Entente AG Troyes-Aube Sud LO (11)	1–0	AS Droupt-Saint-Basle (11)
54.	FC Bréviandes (10)	1–6	Bar-sur-Aube FC (8)
55.	DS Eurville-Bienville (9)	2–1	FC Joinville-Vecqueville (9)
56.	Colombey FC (10)	5–0	FC Hallignicourt (11)
57.	AS Chamouilley Roches-sur-Marne (10)	3–0	Espérance Saint-Dizier (8)
58.	SL Ornel (9)	2–2 (3–4 p)	AF Valcourt (10)
59.	ES Andelot-Rimaucourt-Bourdons (9)	0–1	USI Blaise (8)
60.	US Voillecomte (11)	3–0	Foyer Bayard (11)
61.	AS Poissons-Noncourt (11)	1–1 (4–3 p)	FC Saint-Urbain (11)
62.	FC Villiers-en-Lieu (12)	4–3	ASL Mediolanaise (11)
63.	CS Doulaincourt-Saucourt (11)	1–3	Saint-Gilles FC (11)
64.	FCCS Bragard (10)	4–2	AS Froncles (11)
65.	FC Dampierre (10)	4–1	AS Esnouveaux (11)
66.	FC Bologne (9)	1–1 (5–4 p)	CA Rolampontais (10)
67.	US Arc-en-Barrois (11)	5–2	ES Breuvannes (11)
68.	US Bricon (11)	4–1	FC Sud Champagne (8)
69.	US Biesles (9)	2–3	CS Maranville-Rennepont (9)
70.	SR Neuilly-l'Évêque (10)	1–2	CS Chalindrey (8)
71.	US Fayl-Billot/Hortes (11)	1–1 (6–7 p)	Les Jeunes Saulxurois (11)
72.	US Bourbonnaise (10)	3–2	ES des 3 Châteaux (10)
73.	US Rouvres Auberive (11)	1–1 (4–3 p)	CO Langres (9)
74.	FC Pagny-sur-Meuse (10)	2–1	ASC Charny-sur-Meuse (10)
75.	SC Les Islettes (10)	3–0	AS Baudonvilliers (10)
76.	AS Val d'Ornain (10)	2–0	AS Tréveray (9)
77.	AS Dieue-Sommedieue (9)	3–0	FC Fains-Véel (10)
78.	FC Belleray (10)	4–1	ASC Montiers-sur-Saulx (10)
79.	Gars de l'Ornois Gondrecourt-Le-Château (11)	4–5	FC Revigny (9)
80.	US Thierville (9)	1–2	US Etain-Buzy (8)
81.	RC Saulx et Barrois (10)	0–3	SC Commercy (10)
82.	RC Sommedieue (11)	0–3	FC Demange (11)
83.	Lorraine Vaucouleurs (10)	1–3	Entente Vigneulles-Hannonville-Fresne (8)
84.	ES Maizey-Lacroix (10)	0–5	ES Lérouvillois Cheminote (10)
85.	FC Dugny (9)	4–0	Association Saint-Laurent-Mangiennes (9)
86.	FC Bazoilles-sur-Meuse (12)	0–9	FC Neufchâteau-Liffol (9)
87.	FC Amerey Xertigny (9)	4–1	FC Darney Val de Saône (10)
88.	Dogneville FC (11)	1–4	AS Nomexy-Vincey (10)
89.	FC Vierge (10)	1–6 (Note: Match abandoned on 89 minutes after FC Vierge players left the pitch. FC Vierge penalised, CS Charmes qualify.)	CS Charmes (9)
90.	US Arches-Archettes-Raon (10)	1–2	ASL Coussey-Greux (10)
91.	IFC Lerrain-Esley (11)	3–4	ASC Dompaire (10)
92.	US Mirecourt-Hymont (10)	1–4	AS Padoux (9)
93.	JS Châtenois (11)	2–3	AS Gironcourt (10)
94.	FC Martigny-les-Bains (11)	0–3	RF Bulgnéville (10)
95.	FC Charmois-l'Orgueilleux (11)	1–0	US Lamarche (11)
96.	FC Remiremont Saint-Étienne (9)	4–2	ES Haute Meurthe (10)
97.	SM Taintrux (10)	4–3	SM Etival (10)
98.	CS Thillotin (12)	0–10	SM Bruyères (9)
99.	AS La Chapelle-aux-Bois (11)	1–4 (Note: RC Corcieux penalised, reason unknown, AS La Chapelle-aux-Bois qualify.)	RC Corcieux (11)
100.	FC Saint-Amé Julienrupt (11)	0–0 (4–3 p)	Saulcy FC (9)
101.	FC Haute Moselotte (9)	6–0	FC Val d'Ajol (10)
102.	Entente Bru-Jeanménil SBH (10)	3–0	ASF Saulxures-sur-Moselotte-Thiéfosse (11)
103.	ES Michelloise (11)	3–1	US Senones (11)
104.	AS Vallée de la Moselle (11)	2–7	SR Pouxeux Jarménil (11)
105.	FC Granges-sur-Vologne (10)	2–1	AS Gérardmer (9)
106.	AS Vagney (9)	2–0	AS Ramonchamp (10)
107.	FC Des Ballons (9)	6–1	FC Le Tholy (10)
108.	FC Dommartin-lès-Remiremont (10)	2–1	FC Sainte-Marguerite (9)
109.	Toul JCA (9)	3–0	FC Pont-à-Mousson (10)
110.	USI Jaillon (12)	0–6	ES Custines-Malleloy (9)
111.	FC Écrouves (9)	4–0	AS Grand Couronné (10)
112.	AS Velaine-en-Haye (11)	5–0	AJSE Montauville (10)
113.	Entente Sud 54 (11)	0–3	FC Toul (9)
114.	AS Colombey (10)	0–1	Olympique Haussonville (10)
115.	FC Loisy (12)	1–2	AS Dommartin-lès-Toul (10)
116.	AS Haut-du-Lièvre Nancy (9)	2–2 (3–0 p)	FC Dieulouard (9)
117.	AJS René II (10)	1–1 (6–5 p)	Maxéville FC (10)
118.	AS Gondreville (9)	1–0	Omnisports Frouard Pompey (9)
119.	FR Faulx (10)	0–3	AS Villey-Saint Étienne (8)
120.	FR Thiaville (11)	9–1	Football Lunéville Turc (10)
121.	FC Dombasle-sur-Meurthe (8)	3–0	FC Seichamps (9)
122.	FC Sommerviller (11)	1–3	AS Laneuveville Marainviller (9)
123.	GAS Saint-Clément-Laronxe (11)	0–5	Stade Flévillois (9)
124.	Amicale de Chanteheux (11)	2–1	SC Baccarat (9)
125.	FC Houdemont (9)	1–2	GS Haroué-Benney (8)
126.	GS Vézelise (10)	4–1	US Rosières-aux-Salines (10)
127.	GSA Tomblaine (10)	9–0	ES Bayon-Roville (10)
128.	ES Badonviller-Celles (11)	3–2 (Note: Match abandoned due to flares thrown at the referee. ES Badonviller-Celles penalised, Espérance Gerbéviller qualify.)	Espérance Gerbéviller (10)
129.	AS Chavigny (10)	1–2	AS Blâmont (9)
130.	AS Einvaux (11)	2–6	MJC Pichon (9)
131.	FC Pont-Saint-Vincent (11)	2–1	ASC Saulxures-lès-Nancy (10)
132.	US Beuveille (12)	0–3	ES Crusnes (9)
133.	Entente Réhon Villers Morfontaine (10)	0–1	JS Thil (9)
134.	GS Thiaucourt (10)	1–2	FC Montois (10)
135.	Olympic Saint Charles Haucourt (10)	4–0	AS Mercy-le-Bas (10)
136.	US Conflans Doncourt (9)	3–1	CSP Réhon (9)
137.	FC Mexy (11)	3–5	USB Longwy (9)
138.	US Jarny (8)	5–1	US Lexy (9)
139.	AS Mars-la-Tour (11)	1–3	ES Vallée de l'Othain (10)
140.	US Batilly (9)	3–4	AS Saulnes Longlaville (9)
141.	FC Cosnes et Romain (12)	0–3	CS Godbrange (9)
142.	AS Metz Grange-aux-Bois (11)	3–2	AS Ay-sur-Moselle (11)
143.	AS Sainte-Barbe Sanry Méchy (10)	2–0	SC Marly (9)
144.	Ars-sur-Moselle FC (10)	1–3	AS Hauconcourt (10)
145.	La Lyre Sportive Vantoux (12)	1–4	FC Woippy (10)
146.	US Vigy (11)	0–4	AS Les Côteaux (8)
147.	ESAP Metz (8)	4–0	ES Metz (9)
148.	SC Moulins-lès-Metz (10)	2–0	Fleury FC (9)
149.	FC Novéant (9)	0–0 (1–3 p)	RS La Maxe (9)
150.	AS Metz Porto (12)	1–4	JS Metz Scy-Chazelles (11)
151.	CO Metz Bellecroix (11)	2–4	US ACLI Metz (9)
152.	Athletic Cuvry Augny (9)	4–1	US Ban-Saint-Martin (9)
153.	Entente Gravelotte-Verneville (10)	5–5 (3–4 p)	JSO Ennery (10)
154.	US Waldweistroff (11)	1–1 (3–4 p)	ES Richemont (10)
155.	JS Distroff (11)	3–0	FC Mondelange (10)
156.	JS Manom (11)	0–3	SC Terville (9)
157.	AS Sœtrich (10)	0–7	US Illange (9)
158.	JSA Yutz Cité (10)	0–3	TS Bertrange (9)
159.	ES Kœnigsmacker-Kédange (9)	1–1 (5–4 p)	AG Metzervisse (8)
160.	US Filstroff (10)	5–1	ASC Basse-Ham (9)
161.	JS Rettel Hunting Contz (11)	6–2	US Cattenom (10)
162.	FC Guénange (10)	0–3	US Oudrenne (10)
163.	ESR Rémeling (10)	1–1 (5–3 p)	US Guentrange (10)
164.	US Russange (11)	1–5	FC Hayange (9)
165.	AS Entrange (11)	4–2	Entente Bure-Boulange (9)
166.	FC Angevillers (11)	2–4	AS Œutrange (10)
167.	RS Serémange-Erzange (10)	7–2	JL Knutange (11)
168.	CS Montois (11)	1–2	FC Pierrevillers (10)
169.	RS Ottange-Nondkeil (10)	3–2	US Aumetz (11)
170.	US Florange-Ebange (10)	1–3	CS Volmerange-les-Mines (10)
171.	US Froidcul (11)	2–2 (9–10 p)	US Fontoy (9)
172.	US Volkrange (10)	4–3	US Marspich (10)
173.	USF Brouderdorff (10)	9–1	AS Brouviller (10)
174.	FC Abreschviller (10)	1–0	SS Hilbesheim (10)
175.	FC Dannelbourg (11)	1–2	EF Delme-Solgne (9)
176.	FC Dieuze (9)	1–2	Sportive Lorquinoise (9)
177.	SC Vic-sur-Seille (11)	1–1 (2–4 p)	US Schneckenbusch (12)
178.	US Saint-Louis Lutzelbourg (11)	0–2	FC Château-Salins (9)
179.	EFT Sarrebourg (10)	3–0	AS Grains de Sable Nébing (9)
180.	SR Sarraltroff (11)	0–6	AS Bettborn Hellering (9)
181.	FC Saint-Quirin (11)	0–2	Olympique Mittelbronn 04 (10)
182.	ES Avricourt Moussey (10)	3–0	SR Gosselming (10)
183.	CS Loudrefing (12)	1–4	FC Francaltroff (11)
184.	AS Schaeferhof Dabo (11)	0–4	Montagnarde Walscheid (8)
185.	SC L'Hôpital (11)	1–1 (4–3 p)	FC Folschviller (9)
186.	JA Rémilly (12)	0–10	CO Bouzonville (9)
187.	Huchet AC Saint-Avold (12)	1–3	ES Faulquemont-Créhange (11)
188.	US Rémering Villing (10)	5–0	Flétrange SA (11)
189.	ASJA Saint-Avold (11)	0–3	FC Hochwald (9)
190.	ES Courcelles-sur-Nied (10)	3–0	AS Guerting (11)
191.	MJC Volmerange-lès-Boulay (10)	1–7	AS Anzeling Edling (11)
192.	AS Teting-Pontpierre (10)	0–3	US Bambiderstroff (11)
193.	ES Macheren Petit-Ebersviller (9)	2–2 (1–3 p)	FC Coume (9)
194.	FC Porcelette (11)	0–3	FC Freyming (8)
195.	FC Vœlfling (11)	1–0	JS Wenheck (9)
196.	AS Freybouse-Frémestroff (11)	2–2 (3–1 p)	SO Ippling (10)
197.	US Holving (10)	2–2 (2–3 p)	US Woustviller (10)
198.	AS Rech (11)	0–6	AS Le Val-de-Guéblange (9)
199.	AS Hellimer (10)	8–0	US Hundling (10)
200.	US Alsting-Spicheren (9)	0–0 (6–5 p)	CS Stiring-Wendel (9)
201.	FC Altrippe (12)	0–15	US Hilsprich (11)
202.	FC Carling (10)	2–2 (2–3 p)	CS Diebling (10)
203.	AS Grostenquin Bérig Bistroff (10)	1–2	FC Bruch (10)
204.	ES Lixing Vahl Laning (11)	6–2	FC Farschviller (10)
205.	AS Lixing-lès-Rouhling (11)	0–1	AS Kerbach (11)
206.	FC Sarralbe (9)	4–1	FC Creutzberg Forbach (10)
207.	US Rouhling (10)	4–0	ES Petite-Rosselle (9)
208.	FC Hambach (9)	3–1	US Morsbach (10)
209.	FC Lemberg (12)	0–5	AS Kalhausen (9)
210.	AS Mouterhouse (10)	1–2	AS Welferding (11)
211.	Entente Schorbach Hottviller Volmunster 13 (11)	1–0	Entente Petit-Réderching Siersthal (11)
212.	SF Enchenberg (11)	0–1	FC Rohrbach Bining (10)
213.	Saint-Louis 2017 (11)	0–3	Entente Neufgrange-Siltzheim (11)
214.	FC Waldhouse-Walschbronn (10)	2–1	ES Ormersviller-Epping (11)
215.	Union Soucht Goetzenbruck Meisenthal 2022 (9)	2–3	ES Wies-Woelf 93 (10)
216.	AS Bliesbruck (9)	2–0	AS Neunkirch (9)
217.	FC Bitche (10)	2–4	US Roth (11)
218.	CS Wittring (10)	5–0	FC Istanbul Sarreguemines (10)
219.	ES Rimling-Erching-Obergailbach (10)	4–1	FC Rahling (10)
220.	SC Rœschwoog (10)	4–0	AS Betschdorf (9)
221.	FR Schœnenbourg-Memmelshoffen (15)	0–5	AS Seebach (10)
222.	US Surbourg (11)	0–4	FC Saint-Etienne Seltz (8)
223.	FC Durrenbach (9)	1–0	SS Beinheim (10)
224.	SC Roppenheim (12)	2–9	FC Niederlauterbach (10)
225.	FC Soufflenheim (11)	2–0	FC Soultz-sous-Forêts/Kutzenhausen (10)
226.	US Dalhunden (13)	4–3	FC Oberroedern/Aschbach (10)
227.	FC Neuhaeusel (16)	0–15	AS Hatten (12)
228.	FC Rott (13)	2–2 (3–4 p)	FC Lampertsloch-Merkwiller (12)
229.	SC Rittershoffen (13)	0–0 (5–6 p)	AS Wœrth (11)
230.	FC Riedseltz (9)	1–3	FR Sessenheim-Stattmatten (9)
231.	AS Saint-Étienne Salmbach (15)	3–1	ÉS Morsbronn (13)
232.	AS Platania Gundershoffen (10)	3–1	AS Uhrwiller (9)
233.	FC Eschbach (11)	3–0	US Imbsheim (11)
234.	FC Kindwiller (11)	1–2 (Note: FC Ernolsheim-lès-Saverne penalised, FC Kindwiller qualify, reasons unknown.)	FC Ernolsheim-lès-Saverne (12)
235.	AS Rehthal (10)	0–3	FC Dossenheim-sur-Zinsel (10)
236.	AS Sarrewerden (12)	0–3	Entente Trois Maisons-Phalsbourg (9)
237.	FC Oermingen (13)	3–0	FCE Reichshoffen (12)
238.	FC Dauendorf (12)	3–1	AS Weyer (11)
239.	FC Niedermodern (11)	2–4	CSIE Harskirchen (11)
240.	ES Wimmenau/Wingen-sur-Moder (12)	2–6	AS Mertzwiller (9)
241.	FC Dambach/Neunhoffen (13)	4–4 (3–4 p)	US Gumbrechtshoffen (11)
242.	Entente Mackwiller-Waldhambach (11)	1–3	AS Weinbourg (11)
243.	FC Keskastel (10)	0–7	US Wittersheim (8)
244.	AC Hinterfeld (11)	1–1 (4–5 p)	FA Val de Moder (9)
245.	FC Marlenheim-Kirchheim (11)	0–1	FC Saverne (9)
246.	AS Willgottheim (11)	0–1	Entente de la Mossig Wasselonne/Romanswiller (11)
247.	AS Wahlenheim-Bernolsheim (13)	1–5	FC Niederschaeffolsheim (10)
248.	FC Schwindratzheim (12)	1–1 (3–5 p)	AS Hohengœft (10)
249.	FC Schnersheim (12)	0–2	ASLC Berstett (12)
250.	US Schwenheim-Waldolwisheim (13)	3–4	US Ettendorf (9)
251.	AS Nordheim-Kuttolsheim (13)	1–3	FC Batzendorf (12)
252.	FC Monswiller (12)	6–0	FC Alteckendorf (13)
253.	ASL Duntzenheim (13)	6–1	Entente Quatzenheim-Furdenheim (13)
254.	FC Steinbourg (13)	0–6	FC Wingersheim (9)
255.	AS Lupstein (10)	1–0	FC Schaffhouse-sur-Zorn (10)
256.	SC Dettwiller (11)	2–1	US Eckwersheim (10)
257.	FC Gries (12)	2–6	SR Hoenheim (9)
258.	AS Kilstett (11)	2–6 (Note: FC Ecrivains-Schiltigheim-Bischheim penalised, reason unknown, AS Kilstett qualify.)	FC Ecrivains-Schiltigheim-Bischheim (10)
259.	AS Kurtzenhouse (12)	1–1 (3–2 p)	AS Gambsheim (9)
260.	AS Pfulgriesheim (10)	5–0	AS Reichstett (11)
261.	FC Bischwiller (13)	0–3	AJF Hautepierre (8)
262.	FC Lampertheim (9)	4–2	US Turcs Bischwiller (9)
263.	FC Oberhausbergen (10)	5–0	FC Oberhoffen (11)
264.	FC Souffelweyersheim (10)	3–4	La Wantzenau FC (10)
265.	AS Dingsheim-Griesheim (11)	0–4	FC Weitbruch (9)
266.	FC Niederhausbergen (12)	0–5	FC Herrlisheim (9)
267.	FC Geudertheim (11)	4–3	SS Brumath (10)
268.	FC Rohrwiller (12)	1–5	Fatih-Sport Haguenau (11)
269.	US Égalitaire Strasbourg Neudorf (13)	0–2	FC Eckbolsheim (9)
270.	FC Breuschwickersheim (10)	4–0	Internationale Meinau Académie (9)
271.	FC Lingolsheim (11)	0–7	AS Strasbourg (9)
272.	Strasbourg Université Club (10)	1–2	ASE Cité de l'Ill Strasbourg (9)
273.	FC Stockfeld Colombes (12)	0–2	USL Duppigheim (9)
274.	ASPTT Strasbourg (13)	2–7	FC Entzheim (10)
275.	EB Achenheim (9)	6–0	AP Joie et Santé Strasbourg (9)
276.	AS 2000 Strasbourg (13)	1–7	ES Wolfisheim (13)
277.	CS Neuhof Strasbourg (9)	1–2	ASL Robertsau (8)
278.	FC Ostwald (10)	1–1 (6–5 p)	US Hangenbieten (11)
279.	SOAS Robertsau Strasbourg (13)	1–1 (3–4 p)	AS Holtzheim (9)
280.	AS Musau Strasbourg (10)	2–1	SC Red Star Strasbourg (11)
281.	ASC Blaesheim (12)	1–3	ASB Schirmeck-La Broque (10)
282.	Erno FC (11)	3–1	FC Hipsheim (11)
283.	AS Bergbieten (11)	3–1	AS Portugais Barembach-Bruche (11)
284.	SR Dorlisheim (13)	3–1	FC Avolsheim (13)
285.	AS Wisches-Russ-Lutzelhouse (11)	3–0	US Nordhouse (8)
286.	US Dachstein (10)	4–1	FC Boersch (11)
287.	CS Wolxheim (12)	1–9	FC Dangolsheim (11)
288.	SC Dinsheim (12)	9–2	AS Altorf (12)
289.	FC Rosheim (12)	3–2	CS Fegersheim (9)
290.	Entente Sportive Haslach-Urmatt-Grendelbruch (13)	1–1 (5–3 p)	OC Lipsheim (11)
291.	US Innenheim (9)	2–3	AS Bischoffsheim (9)
292.	Entente Balbronn Westhoffen (12)	1–0	US Hindisheim (9)
293.	FC Matzenheim (11)	1–2	AS Niedernai (11)
294.	AS Benfeld (13)	4–6	AS Muttersholtz (13)
295.	FC Herbsheim (10)	1–1 (2–4 p)	SR Zellwiller (11)
296.	FC Barr (13)	0–16	AS Heiligenstein (11)
297.	FC Ebermunster (13)	1–1 (5–4 p)	US Meistratzheim (11)
298.	FC Hilsenheim (12)	1–3	FC Boofzheim (13)
299.	US Goxwiller (13)	3–0	US Huttenheim (11)
300.	AS Obenheim (13)	0–4	ES Stotzheim (10)
301.	CA Plobsheim (12)	5–1	UJ Epfig (10)
302.	ASC Saint-Pierre-Bois/Triembach-au-Val (10)	4–1	FC Bindernheim (9)
303.	AS Natzwiller (11)	3–1	ASC Brotsch (12)
304.	SC Maisonsgoutte (13)	2–5	FC Rhinau (9)
305.	FC Wittisheim (12)	3–3 (6–7 p)	AS Elsenheim (11)
306.	AS Portugais Sélestat (10)	7–1	AS Mussig (10)
307.	FC Vogelgrun Obersaasheim (12)	4–1	AS Châtenois (12)
308.	FC Ingersheim (9)	2–0	RC Kintzheim (9)
309.	FC Ostheim-Houssen (9)	3–3 (6–5 p)	AS Marckolsheim (9)
310.	FR Jebsheim-Muntzenheim (10)	1–6	FC Bennwihr (9)
311.	FCI Riquewihr (13)	0–3	US Baldenheim (9)
312.	AS Schœnau (11)	0–2	SC Sélestat (8)
313.	AS Sigolsheim (12)	2–3 (Note: FC Grussenheim penalised, reason unknown, AS Sigolsheim qualify.)	FC Grussenheim (10)
314.	FC Artolsheim (11)	2–4	AS Ribeauvillé (8)
315.	SR Bergheim (11)	0–5	AS Guémar (8)
316.	CS Sainte-Croix-aux-Mines (13)	1–1 (3–2 p)	US Artzenheim (13)
317.	SR Widensolen (10)	2–1	FC Buhl (10)
318.	AS Turckheim (10)	2–2 (2–4 p)	AS Munster (9)
319.	US Gunsbach-Zimmerbach (12)	2–3	FC Fessenheim (9)
320.	SR Kaysersberg (9)	3–3 (4–3 p)	AS Herrlisheim (11)
321.	US Colmar (10)	4–4 (4–2 p)	AS Vallée Noble (12)
322.	FC Oberhergheim (13)	0–3	FC Hirtzfelden (8)
323.	FC Wettolsheim (11)	0–3	FC Meyenheim (9)
324.	FC Merxheim (10)	0–8	AGIIR Florival (8)
325.	AS Pfaffenheim (9)	0–2	FC Réguisheim (10)
326.	ÉS Wihr-au-Val (13)	1–5	AS Wintzenheim (11)
327.	FC Heiteren (10)	3–2	AS Andolsheim (11)
328.	FC Horbourg-Wihr (10)	2–2 (4–5 p)	FC Gundolsheim (10)
329.	FC Ungersheim (11)	3–1	AS Guewenheim (11)
330.	FC Ensisheim (10)	2–5	FC Munchhouse (9)
331.	AS Blodelsheim (12)	3–3 (4–1 p)	Entente Oderen-Kruth (13)
332.	FC Soultz 1919 (12)	2–5	US Oberbruck Dolleren (10)
333.	FC Brunstatt (9)	2–4	AS Raedersheim (8)
334.	AS Rumersheim-le-Haut (13)	2–2 (5–6 p)	Cernay FC (9)
335.	FC Roderen (11)	3–2	AS Blanc Vieux-Thann (12)
336.	US Vallée de la Thur (9)	1–0	US Pulversheim FC (9)
337.	Thann FC 2017 (11)	2–2 (5–6 p)	AS Heimsbrunn (10)
338.	SR Saint-Amarin (9)	1–3	FC Blue Star Reiningue (10)
339.	FC Feldkirch (11)	4–3	AS Lutterbach (9)
340.	AS Aspach-le-Haut (10)	6–0	FC Masevaux (10)
341.	AS Coteaux Mulhouse (10)	3–0	RC Mulhouse (10)
342.	FC Mulhausen (13)	3–1	AS Rixheim (11)
343.	AS Schlierbach (12)	1–1 (4–3 p)	US Zimmersheim-Eschentzwiller (11)
344.	FC Battenheim (13)	1–7	FC Habsheim (9)
345.	AS Theodore Ruelisheim Wittenheim (8)	2–0	US Azzurri Mulhouse (9)
346.	Étoile Mulhouse (11)	3–8	FC Sausheim (9)
347.	FC Steinbrunn-le-Bas (10)	2–3	FC Anatolie Mulhouse (10)
348.	RC Landser (12)	1–4	Stade Burnhauptois (8)
349.	FC Baldersheim (9)	0–3	FC Morschwiller-le-Bas (9)
350.	Mulhouse Foot Réunis (8)	2–2 (3–2 p)	CS Mulhouse Bourtzwiller (9)
351.	AS Hochstatt (11)	2–5	Montreux Sports (9)
352.	Entente Traubach-Mertzen (10)	0–3	FC Uffheim (9)
353.	AS Wittersdorf (13)	0–6	FC Village Neuf (10)
354.	Entente Oltingue Raedersdorf (11)	2–2 (3–4 p)	ASCCO Helfrantzkirch (11)
355.	FC Sierentz (10)	3–6	SS Zillisheim (8)
356.	AS Hausgauen (12)	3–9	FC Seppois-Bisel (10)
357.	AS Durlinsdorf (11)	5–0	FC Illfurth (10)
358.	US Hésingue (8)	1–2	Union Carspach-Hirtzbach (9)
359.	AS Riespach (12)	3–4	Entente Hagenbach-Balschwiller (10)
360.	Alliance Folgensbourg Muespach (10)	3–3 (3–4 p)	FC Kappelen (9)

=== Second round ===
These matches were played between 2 and 17 September 2023.

Second Round Results: Grand Est
Tie no	Home team (Tier)	Score	Away team (Tier)
1.	AS Val de l'Aisne (8)	4–2	FC Blagny-Carignan (8)
2.	Joyeuse de Warcq (11)	0–5	CA Villers-Semeuse (7)
3.	FC Rimogne (11)	0–4	Cheveuges-Saint-Aignan CO (9)
4.	US Flize (10)	2–0	FC Porcien (8)
5.	SC Vivarois (10)	0–7	AS Asfeld (7)
6.	CA Monthermé (10)	3–3 (2–4 p)	AS Mouzon (10)
7.	AS Ville-de-Lumes (11)	0–4	AS Tournes/Renwez/Les Mazures/Arreux/Montcornet (8)
8.	Rethel SF (7)	4–0	US Les Ayvelles (8)
9.	US Machault (11)	0–5	USC Nouvion-sur-Meuse (9)
10.	FC Pouru Saint-Rémy (12)	1–1 (3–5 p)	ES Saulces-Monclin (9)
11.	ASR Raucourt (11)	2–4	Le Theux FC (8)
12.	SOS Buzancy (10)	1–3	AS Bourg-Rocroi (9)
13.	EM Charleville-Mézières (10)	0–2	ES Charleville-Mézières (8)
14.	FC Vallée de la Suippe (10)	0–1	Nord Ardennes (9)
15.	US Bazeilles (8)	1–3	Olympique Charleville Neufmanil Aiglemont (7)
16.	AS Monthois' (11)	1–2	Olympique Torcy-Sedan (9)
17.	USS Sermaize (10)	2–3	Vitry FC (7)
18.	AS Cheminon (9)	6–2	US Avize-Grauves (7)
19.	Entente Châtelraould/Les Rivières-Henruel/Bignicourt-sur-Marne (10)	1–3	FC Christo (7)
20.	AS Mourmelon Livry Bouy (10)	1–6	FCF La Neuvillette-Jamin (7)
21.	Entente Somsois Margerie Saint-Utin (10)	0–5	Nord Champagne FC (8)
22.	US Oiry (9)	1–1 (10–9 p)	FC Tinqueux Champagne (8)
23.	ASPTT Châlons (8)	2–2 (3–4 p)	CS Agéen (8)
24.	AS Courtisols ESTAN (10)	2–9	Reims Murigny Franco Portugais (8)
25.	Reims Athletic FC (11)	1–3	Bétheny FC (8)
26.	AS Gueux (10)	1–1 (4–2 p)	Entente Étoges-Vert (11)
27.	AS Heiltz-le-Maurupt (11)	0–12	AS Cernay-Berru-Lavannes (7)
28.	FC Saint-Martin-sur-le-Pré/La Veuve/Recy (10)	2–2 (4–2 p)	AS Loisy-sur-Marne (10)
29.	Espérance Rémoise (8)	1–0	AS Saint-Brice-Courcelles (9)
30.	AS Taissy (9)	1–10	FC Côte des Blancs (7)
31.	ES Muizonnaise (11)	3–1	Saint-Memmie FC (11)
32.	ES Witry-les-Reims (9)	4–2	Châlons FCO (7)
33.	Foyer Barsequanais (8)	1–5	JS Saint-Julien FC (7)
34.	AS Pont-Saint-Marie (10)	1–2	ES Nord Aubois (8)
35.	JS Vaudoise (8)	3–1	UFC Aube (8)
36.	Étoile Chapelaine (10)	0–3	AS Chartreux (9)
37.	ESC Melda (9)	1–2	Romilly Champagne FC (9)
38.	RCS La Chapelle (7)	1–3	FC Vallant/Les Grès (8)
39.	SC Sézannais (7)	3–2	Alliance Sud-Ouest Football Aubois (8)
40.	US Vendeuvre (9)	3–3 (5–4 p) (Note: Tie reversed from original draw.)	FC Morgendois (9)
41.	UCS Nogentaise (11)	0–6	FC Essoyes (9)
42.	Entente AG Troyes-Aube Sud LO (11)	0–5	Bar-sur-Aube FC (8)
43.	US Bourbonnaise (10)	1–3	FC Saints-Geosmois (7)
44.	USI Blaise (8)	1–1 (3–1 p)	FC Bologne (9)
45.	AS Chamouilley Roches-sur-Marne (10)	0–1	US Voillecomte (11)
46.	CS Maranville-Rennepont (9)	0–8	US Éclaron (7)
47.	US Rouvres Auberive (11)	0–2	Colombey FC (10)
48.	AS Sarrey-Montigny (7)	5–1	US Arc-en-Barrois (11)
49.	AF Valcourt (10)	2–4	ASPTT Chaumont (8)
50.	FC Villiers-en-Lieu (12)	3–0	AS Poissons-Noncourt (11)
51.	Stade Chevillonnais (8)	3–1	FC Prez Bourmont (8)
52.	FCCS Bragard (10)	4–1 (Note: FCCS Bragard penalised, reason unknown, FC Dampierre qualify.)	FC Dampierre (10)
53.	Les Jeunes Saulxurois (11)	1–4	DS Eurville-Bienville (9)
54.	Saint-Gilles FC (11)	1–2	US Montier-en-Der (8)
55.	US Bricon (11)	1–1 (1–4 p)	CS Chalindrey (8)
56.	RF Bulgnéville (10)	0–2	GS Haroué-Benney (8)
57.	AS Vagney (9)	1–2	FC Des Ballons (9)
58.	ASL Coussey-Greux (10)	6–1	FC Charmois-l'Orgueilleux (11)
59.	AS La Chapelle-aux-Bois (11)	1–3	Bulgnéville Contrex Vittel FC (8)
60.	FC Neufchâteau-Liffol (9)	1–0	ES Avière Darnieulles (7)
61.	AS Gironcourt (10)	1–1 (5–4 p)	Entente Bru-Jeanménil SBH (10)
62.	FC Haute Moselotte (9)	4–1	FC Dommartin-lès-Remiremont (10)
63.	ES Michelloise (11)	0–5	AS Saint-Nabord (8)
64.	FC Éloyes (7)	2–1	AS Girancourt-Dommartin-Chaumousey (8)
65.	FC Granges-sur-Vologne (10)	1–3	FC Amerey Xertigny (9)
66.	SR Pouxeux Jarménil (11)	1–3	SM Taintrux (10)
67.	FC Remiremont Saint-Étienne (9)	0–5	ES Golbey (7)
68.	FC Saint-Amé Julienrupt (11)	0–4	SR Saint-Dié (7)
69.	AS Nomexy-Vincey (10)	4–1	SM Bruyères (9)
70.	CS Charmes (9)	5–1	ASC Dompaire (10)
71.	AS Padoux (9)	0–5	FC Hadol-Dounoux (8)
72.	GS Vézelise (10)	2–4	Entente Sorcy Void-Vacon (7)
73.	FC Écrouves (9)	3–3 (3–4 p)	AJS René II (10)
74.	FC Toul (9)	1–1 (6–5 p)	FC Saint-Mihiel (8)
75.	FC Pont-Saint-Vincent (11)	1–5	Bar-le-Duc FC (7)
76.	AS Velaine-en-Haye (11)	1–2	MJC Pichon (9)
77.	Entente Centre Ornain (7)	2–0	AS Lay-Saint-Christophe/Bouxieres-aux-Dames (7)
78.	FC Pagny-sur-Meuse (10)	0–7	AS Villey-Saint Étienne (8)
79.	FC Demange (11)	1–6	AS Dommartin-lès-Toul (10)
80.	Olympique Haussonville (10)	0–2	US Behonne-Longeville-en-Barois (8)
81.	ES Lérouvillois Cheminote (10)	0–3	AF Laxou Sapinière (8)
82.	COS Villers (7)	4–1	CS&O Blénod-Pont-à-Mousson (8)
83.	SC Commercy (10)	1–6	AS Ludres (8)
84.	ES Custines-Malleloy (9)	7–0	AS Val d'Ornain (10)
85.	AS Haut-du-Lièvre Nancy (9)	3–0	AS Gondreville (9)
86.	FC Revigny (9)	0–2	Toul JCA (9)
87.	Olympique Mittelbronn 04 (10)	0–5	AS Réding (8)
88.	US Schneckenbusch (12)	2–3	EF Delme-Solgne (9)
89.	AS Blâmont (9)	1–1 (4–5 p)	ES Laneuveville (8)
90.	Stade Flévillois (9)	2–3	ENJ Val-de-Seille (8)
91.	AS Bettborn Hellering (9)	1–1 (0–3 p)	FC Abreschviller (10)
92.	Amicale de Chanteheux (11)	0–6	US Vandœuvre (7)
93.	FC Château-Salins (9)	1–1 (8–9 p)	FC Saint-Max-Essey (8)
94.	Sportive Lorquinoise (9)	1–0	FC Sarrebourg (7)
95.	ES Avricourt Moussey (10)	2–3	FR Thiaville (11)
96.	Espérance Gerbéviller (10)	3–0	USF Brouderdorff (10)
97.	FC Dombasle-sur-Meurthe (8)	1–2	ES Heillecourt (7)
98.	EFT Sarrebourg (10)	3–1	Montagnarde Walscheid (8)
99.	AS Laneuveville Marainviller (9)	0–1	GSA Tomblaine (10)
100.	FC Pulnoy (8)	2–1	AC Blainville-Damelevières (7)
101.	JSO Ennery (10)	1–8	US Etain-Buzy (8)
102.	RS La Maxe (9)	0–2	SC Moulins-lès-Metz (10)
103.	AS Sainte-Barbe Sanry Méchy (10)	2–1	US Conflans Doncourt (9)
104.	AS Metz Grange-aux-Bois (11)	1–2	US Jarny (8)
105.	AS Les Côteaux (8)	0–4	SF Verdun Belleville (8)
106.	US Châtel Conquistadors (8)	4–0	AS Dieue-Sommedieue (9)
107.	AS Hauconcourt (10)	1–4	US Briey (8)
108.	US ACLI Metz (9)	2–2 (2–4 p)	FC Montois (10)
109.	FC Woippy (10)	0–3	UL Plantières Metz (7)
110.	Entente Vigneulles-Hannonville-Fresne (8)	3–2	FC Verny-Louvigny-Cuvry (8)
111.	Val de l'Orne FC (7)	2–2 (5–4 p)	AS Montigny-lès-Metz (7)
112.	JS Metz Scy-Chazelles (11)	2–1	FC Dugny (9)
113.	FC Belleray (10)	3–2	SC Les Islettes (10)
114.	RS Magny (7)	2–0	FC Bassin Piennois (7)
115.	RS Amanvillers (7)	2–2 (4–2 p)	ESAP Metz (8)
116.	ES Woippy (8)	2–2 (3–4 p)	FC Devant-les-Ponts Metz (8)
117.	Athletic Cuvry Augny (9)	2–1	AS Saint-Julien-lès-Metz (8)
118.	ES Vallée de l'Othain (10)	1–7	AS Entrange (11)
119.	JS Distroff (11)	0–3	CS Godbrange (9)
120.	ES Richemont (10)	1–2	USB Longwy (9)
121.	FC Pierrevillers (10)	3–6	SC Terville (9)
122.	AS Algrange (7)	4–0	ES Rosselange Vitry (7)
123.	ES Crusnes (9)	1–2	JS Audunoise (8)
124.	AS Œutrange (10)	0–13	US Yutz (7)
125.	US Illange (9)	3–2	US Fontoy (9)
126.	ES Longuyon (8)	0–2	FC Yutz (7)
127.	US Oudrenne (10)	6–1	JS Rettel Hunting Contz (11)
128.	AS Saulnes Longlaville (9)	1–1 (5–4 p)	AS Clouange (8)
129.	ES Kœnigsmacker-Kédange (9)	7–1	ESR Rémeling (10)
130.	ES Fameck (7)	2–4	FC Hettange-Grande (7)
131.	RS Serémange-Erzange (10)	2–7	ES Marange-Silvange (8)
132.	CS Volmerange-les-Mines (10)	2–2 (5–6 p)	Olympic Saint Charles Haucourt (10)
133.	TS Bertrange (9)	0–0 (1–3 p)	UL Rombas (8)
134.	FC Hayange (9)	0–2	AS Talange (8)
135.	JS Thil (9)	0–0 (3–4 p)	FC Hagondange (7)
136.	US Volkrange (10)	1–1 (1–3 p)	CS Veymerange (8)
137.	ES Courcelles-sur-Nied (10)	8–0	RS Ottange-Nondkeil (10)
138.	US Filstroff (10)	0–3	FC Trémery (8)
139.	US Hilsprich (11)	1–3	CO Bouzonville (9)
140.	AS Hellimer (10)	0–4	US Valmont (8)
141.	FC Francaltroff (11)	0–5	US Rémering Villing (10)
142.	FC Bruch (10)	1–1 (1–3 p)	FC Coume (9)
143.	US Bambiderstroff (11)	0–3	US Alsting-Spicheren (9)
144.	FC Hochwald (9)	2–3	FC Longeville-lès-Saint-Avold (8)
145.	SC L'Hôpital (11)	3–1	AS Freybouse-Frémestroff (11)
146.	SR Creutzwald 03 (8)	0–0 (12–13 p)	US Farébersviller 05 (8)
147.	FC Freyming (8)	4–1	FC Metzing (8)
148.	ES Faulquemont-Créhange (11)	1–12	AS Morhange (7)
149.	AS Anzeling Edling (11)	0–9	SO Merlebach (7)
150.	FC Vœlfling (11)	0–6	Étoile Naborienne Saint-Avold (7)
151.	AS Kalhausen (9)	2–2 (3–2 p)	US Rouhling (10)
152.	FC Rohrbach Bining (10)	4–0	US Behren-lès-Forbach (7)
153.	Entente Neufgrange-Siltzheim (11)	3–2	Entente Schorbach Hottviller Volmunster 13 (11)
154.	US Roth (11)	0–6	AS Bliesbruck (9)
155.	FC Waldhouse-Walschbronn (10)	1–3	Achen-Etting-Schmittviller (7)
156.	AS Welferding (11)	0–12	US Nousseviller (7)
157.	US Woustviller (10)	3–1	ES Wies-Woelf 93 (10)
158.	AS Le Val-de-Guéblange (9)	1–2	ES Rimling-Erching-Obergailbach (10)
159.	CS Diebling (10)	1–5	FC Sarralbe (9)
160.	AS Kerbach (11)	0–3	FC Hambach (9)
161.	CS Wittring (10)	3–1	ES Lixing Vahl Laning (11)
162.	FC Oermingen (13)	0–3	AS Butten-Diemeringen (7)
163.	US Ettendorf (9)	0–0 (3–4 p)	AS Ohlungen (7)
164.	SC Dettwiller (11)	0–4	AS Hochfelden (8)
165.	AS Lupstein (10)	0–4	SC Drulingen (8)
166.	AS Platania Gundershoffen (10)	2–3	ASI Avenir (7)
167.	Entente de la Mossig Wasselonne/Romanswiller (11)	0–1	FC Schweighouse-sur-Moder (7)
168.	US Gumbrechtshoffen (11)	1–7	FC Dossenheim-sur-Zinsel (10)
169.	FC Saverne (9)	2–1	AS Mertzwiller (9)
170.	ASL Duntzenheim (13)	1–8	AS Ingwiller/Menchhoffen (8)
171.	US Wittersheim (8)	4–2	AS Montbronn (8)
172.	AS Weinbourg (11)	1–1 (4–5 p)	FC Wingersheim (9)
173.	FC Monswiller (12)	3–5	Entente Trois Maisons-Phalsbourg (9)
174.	FC Dauendorf (12)	2–5	AS Hohengœft (10)
175.	CSIE Harskirchen (11)	7–1	FA Val de Moder (9)
176.	FC Mulhausen (13)	0–10	FC Kindwiller (11)
177.	La Wantzenau FC (10)	2–1	FC Geudertheim (11)
178.	AS Kurtzenhouse (12)	0–7	AS Hunspach (8)
179.	AS Saint-Étienne Salmbach (15)	2–7	FC Niederlauterbach (10)
180.	SC Rœschwoog (10)	0–1	FCE Schirrhein (7)
181.	AS Hatten (12)	0–1	FC Saint-Etienne Seltz (8)
182.	AS Wœrth (11)	3–1	FC Batzendorf (12)
183.	FR Sessenheim-Stattmatten (9)	0–2	FC Mothern (8)
184.	Fatih-Sport Haguenau (11)	0–2	Entente Kaltenhouse/Marienthal (8)
185.	AS Hoerdt (7)	2–3	FC Scheibenhard (7)
186.	FC Niederschaeffolsheim (10)	0–3	FC Steinseltz (8)
187.	FC Lampertsloch-Merkwiller (12)	1–9	AS Kilstett (11)
188.	FC Durrenbach (9)	1–2	FC Drusenheim (7)
189.	US Schleithal (8)	4–0	US Preuschdorf-Langensoultzbach (8)
190.	FC Weitbruch (9)	2–1	AS Seebach (10)
191.	FC Soufflenheim (11)	2–2 (4–2 p)	FC Eschbach (11)
192.	US Dalhunden (13)	1–6	AS Herrlisheim (11)
193.	USL Duppigheim (9)	3–2	FC Lampertheim (9)
194.	SR Hoenheim (9)	4–1	FC Ostwald (10)
195.	ES Wolfisheim (13)	1–3	AS Menora Strasbourg (7)
196.	Erno FC (11)	0–7	AS Mundolsheim (8)
197.	CA Plobsheim (12)	3–3 (6–5 p)	AS Holtzheim (9)
198.	US Ittenheim (8)	1–0	ASPV Strasbourg (7)
199.	FC Breuschwickersheim (10)	2–3	FC Truchtersheim (8)
200.	FC Oberhausbergen (10)	1–0	US Oberschaeffolsheim (8)
201.	ASLC Berstett (12)	2–1	AS Pfulgriesheim (10)
202.	FC Dahlenheim (8)	2–1	ES Pfettisheim (8)
203.	FC Entzheim (10)	0–1	FC Eckbolsheim (9)
204.	US Dachstein (10)	2–1	ASL Robertsau (8)
205.	AS Musau Strasbourg (10)	1–7	AS Neudorf (8)
206.	ASE Cité de l'Ill Strasbourg (9)	4–2	EB Achenheim (9)
207.	AS Elsau Portugais Strasbourg (8)	4–1	AS Sermersheim (8)
208.	AS Bergbieten (11)	4–2	FC Rhinau (9)
209.	Entente Balbronn Westhoffen (12)	2–4	AS Bischoffsheim (9)
210.	FC Rossfeld (8)	2–3	AS Erstein (7)
211.	FC Dangolsheim (11)	5–2	AS Natzwiller (11)
212.	AS Heiligenstein (11)	1–5	FCSR Obernai (7)
213.	SR Dorlisheim (13)	2–8	AJF Hautepierre (8)
214.	AS Strasbourg (9)	3–1	FC Eschau (8)
215.	SC Dinsheim (12)	0–1	ASB Schirmeck-La Broque (10)
216.	AS Niedernai (11)	1–1 (2–4 p)	ASC Saint-Pierre-Bois/Triembach-au-Val (10)
217.	FC Ebersmunster (13)	2–1	US Goxwiller (13)
218.	Entente Sportive Haslach-Urmatt-Grendelbruch (13)	2–1	ES Stotzheim (10)
219.	FC Boofzheim (13)	1–5	FC Rosheim (12)
220.	US Scherwiller (7)	3–0	ALFC Duttlenheim (8)
221.	SR Zellwiller (11)	1–4	AS Wisches-Russ-Lutzelhouse (11)
222.	AS Ribeauvillé (8)	8–3	FC Sainte-Croix-en-Plaine (8)
223.	AS Muttersholtz (13)	0–14	FC Illhaeusern (7)
224.	US Colmar (10)	0–7	AS Portugais Sélestat (10)
225.	AS Guémar (8)	2–2 (6–7 p)	AS Sundhoffen (7)
226.	AS Sigolsheim (12)	3–1	FC Vogelgrun Obersaasheim (12)
227.	CS Sainte-Croix-aux-Mines (13)	2–5	FC Ostheim-Houssen (9)
228.	SC Sélestat (8)	2–3	FC Ingersheim (9)
229.	FC Bennwihr (9)	6–1	SR Kaysersberg (9)
230.	US Baldenheim (9)	2–1	FC Niederhergheim (8)
231.	AS Elsenheim (11)	2–6	Racing HW 96 (8)
232.	AS Munster (9)	1–1 (4–5 p)	FC Rouffach (8)
233.	FC Roderen (11)	3–4	SR Widensolen (10)
234.	FC Gundolsheim (10)	1–8	FC Kingersheim (8)
235.	FC Feldkirch (11)	1–4	FC Heiteren (10)
236.	FC Munchhouse (9)	3–5	FC Hirtzfelden (8)
237.	US Vallée de la Thur (9)	1–8	US Wittenheim (7)
238.	AGIIR Florival (8)	1–0	Mouloudia Mulhouse (7)
239.	FC Meyenheim (9)	2–5	SC Ottmarsheim (8)
240.	FC Ungersheim (11)	1–0	AS Berrwiller-Hartsmannswiller (8)
241.	FC Blue Star Reiningue (10)	2–2 (3–5 p)	AS Aspach-le-Haut (10)
242.	FC Fessenheim (9)	6–1	AS Raedersheim (8)
243.	FC Wintzfelden-Osenbach (7)	0–0 (4–2 p)	AS Heimsbrunn (10)
244.	AS Wintzenheim (11)	1–7	FC Riedisheim (8)
245.	AS Blodelsheim (12)	0–3	Cernay FC (9)
246.	FC Réguisheim (10)	4–0	FC Pfastatt 1926 (8)
247.	US Oberbruck Dolleren (10)	3–1	FCRS Richwiller (8)
248.	FC Pays Rhénan (8)	3–4	AS Blotzheim (7)
249.	FC Uffheim (9)	0–0 (4–3 p)	RC Dannemarie (8)
250.	FC Bartenheim (7)	4–3	FC Hagenthal-Wentzwiller (8)
251.	SS Zillisheim (8)	4–2	Montreux Sports (9)
252.	FC Seppois-Bisel (10)	2–1	FC Kappelen (9)
253.	FC Anatolie Mulhouse (10)	5–1	Stade Burnhauptois (8)
254.	Mulhouse Foot Réunis (8)	8–2	US Hirsingue (8)
255.	Union Carspach-Hirtzbach (9)	3–3 (4–2 p)	FC Habsheim (9)
256.	AS Schlierbach (12)	0–1	FC Morschwiller-le-Bas (9)
257.	ASCCO Helfrantzkirch (11)	0–3	AS Coteaux Mulhouse (10)
258.	FC Village Neuf (10)	1–4	ASL Kœtzingue (7)
259.	AS Durlinsdorf (11)	1–3	AS Theodore Ruelisheim Wittenheim (8)
260.	Entente Hagenbach-Balschwiller (10)	3–2	FC Sausheim (9)

=== Third round ===
These matches were played between 16 and 24 September 2023.

Third Round Results: Grand Est
Tie no	Home team (Tier)	Score	Away team (Tier)
1.	AS Mouzon (10)	1–2	CS Sedan Ardennes (8)
2.	AS Tournes/Renwez/Les Mazures/Arreux/Montcornet (8)	1–3	AS Asfeld (7)
3.	Olympique Torcy-Sedan (9)	1–2	Nord Champagne FC (8)
4.	AS Cernay-Berru-Lavannes (7)	0–0 (4–2 p)	Cormontreuil FC (6)
5.	ES Charleville-Mézières (8)	1–4 (Note: Match abandoned, ES Charleville-Mézières penalised, AS Val de l'Aisne qualify.)	AS Val de l'Aisne (8)
6.	Nord Ardennes (9)	1–4	Rethel SF (7)
7.	CA Villers-Semeuse (7)	0–3	AS Prix-lès-Mézières (5)
8.	US Flize (10)	0–1	Olympique Charleville Neufmanil Aiglemont (7)
9.	ES Saulces-Monclin (9)	1–1 (2–3 p)	AS Bourg-Rocroi (9)
10.	Le Theux FC (8)	0–6	FC Bogny (6)
11.	Cheveuges-Saint-Aignan CO (9)	5–0	USC Nouvion-sur-Meuse (9)
12.	FC Vallant/Les Grès (8)	5–2	AS Cheminon (9)
13.	Romilly Champagne FC (9)	2–0	CS Agéen (8)
14.	Vitry FC (7)	2–5	FC Nogentais (6)
15.	RC Épernay Champagne (6)	0–2	EF Reims Sainte-Anne (5)
16.	AS Gueux (10)	2–2 (6–5 p)	ES Nord Aubois (8)
17.	FC Côte des Blancs (7)	5–0	JS Saint-Julien FC (7)
18.	AS Chartreux (9)	2–1	JS Vaudoise (8)
19.	FC Saint-Martin-sur-le-Pré/La Veuve/Recy (10)	0–3	FC Christo (7)
20.	Reims Murigny Franco Portugais (8)	4–1	US Oiry (9)
21.	ES Muizonnaise (11)	1–10	FC Saint-Meziery (6)
22.	SC Sézannais (7)	2–2 (3–4 p)	Espérance Rémoise (8)
23.	Bétheny FC (8)	2–1	ES Witry-les-Reims (9)
24.	FCF La Neuvillette-Jamin (7)	1–3	ES Fagnières (6)
25.	US Vendeuvre (9)	1–2	Bar-le-Duc FC (7)
26.	FC Villiers-en-Lieu (12)	1–2	CS Chalindrey (8)
27.	FC Essoyes (9)	0–4	Bar-sur-Aube FC (8)
28.	DS Eurville-Bienville (9)	0–2	US Éclaron (7)
29.	USI Blaise (8)	0–3	FC Métropole Troyenne (5)
30.	ASPTT Chaumont (8)	3–1	FC Saints-Geosmois (7)
31.	AS Sarrey-Montigny (7)	1–4	Chaumont FC (6)
32.	US Voillecomte (11)	0–5	Stade Chevillonnais (8)
33.	Colombey FC (10)	0–14	SC Marnaval (6)
34.	FC Dampierre (10)	0–2	US Montier-en-Der (8)
35.	AS Gironcourt (10)	0–0 (3–4 p)	AS Nomexy-Vincey (10)
36.	FC Hadol-Dounoux (8)	4–4 (4–5 p)	AS Saint-Nabord (8)
37.	ES Golbey (7)	0–7	US Raon-l'Étape (5)
38.	FC Des Ballons (9)	2–0	FC Neufchâteau-Liffol (9)
39.	FC Lunéville (6)	0–2	GS Neuves-Maisons (6)
40.	ASL Coussey-Greux (10)	1–3	US Vandœuvre (7)
41.	FC Haute Moselotte (9)	1–1 (4–5 p)	SR Saint-Dié (7)
42.	Bulgnéville Contrex Vittel FC (8)	1–1 (2–4 p)	FC Éloyes (7)
43.	SM Taintrux (10)	0–5	CS Charmes (9)
44.	FC Amerey Xertigny (9)	3–1	GS Haroué-Benney (8)
45.	ES Laneuveville (8)	0–0 (2–4 p)	FC Saint-Max-Essey (8)
46.	FR Thiaville (11)	1–1 (4–5 p)	US Behonne-Longeville-en-Barois (8)
47.	ENJ Val-de-Seille (8)	1–1 (4–2 p)	AS Ludres (8)
48.	Toul JCA (9)	1–6	ES Heillecourt (7)
49.	AJS René II (10)	0–0 (5–3 p)	AF Laxou Sapinière (8)
50.	MJC Pichon (9)	1–2	Entente Centre Ornain (7)
51.	GSA Tomblaine (10)	0–2	ES Thaon (5)
52.	Entente Sorcy Void-Vacon (7)	0–2	COS Villers (7)
53.	Espérance Gerbéviller (10)	2–2 (2–1 p)	ES Custines-Malleloy (9)
54.	FC Pulnoy (8)	0–3	Jarville JF (6)
55.	FC Toul (9)	0–3	AS Pagny-sur-Moselle (6)
56.	AS Villey-Saint Étienne (8)	3–2	RC Champigneulles (6)
57.	AS Dommartin-lès-Toul (10)	0–1	AS Haut-du-Lièvre Nancy (9)
58.	US Etain-Buzy (8)	1–5	APM Metz (6)
59.	FC Hagondange (7)	1–0	US Châtel Conquistadors (8)
60.	SC Moulins-lès-Metz (10)	1–2	US Jarny (8)
61.	AS Sainte-Barbe Sanry Méchy (10)	0–2	FC Devant-les-Ponts Metz (8)
62.	Val de l'Orne FC (7)	3–1	RS Amanvillers (7)
63.	FC Montois (10)	0–3	RS Magny (7)
64.	JS Metz Scy-Chazelles (11)	3–3 (5–4 p)	US Briey (8)
65.	EF Delme-Solgne (9)	4–0	FC Belleray (10)
66.	SF Verdun Belleville (8)	1–1 (2–3 p)	Athletic Cuvry Augny (9)
67.	UL Plantières Metz (7)	2–2 (6–7 p)	Entente Vigneulles-Hannonville-Fresne (8)
68.	US Oudrenne (10)	0–3	FC Hettange-Grande (7)
69.	FC Trémery (8)	5–0	UL Rombas (8)
70.	ES Villerupt-Thil (6)	3–0	ES Gandrange (6)
71.	SC Terville (9)	1–3	FC Yutz (7)
72.	CS Veymerange (8)	1–0	ES Kœnigsmacker-Kédange (9)
73.	ES Courcelles-sur-Nied (10)	2–2 (8–9 p)	AS Algrange (7)
74.	AS Talange (8)	4–0	US Illange (9)
75.	AS Saulnes Longlaville (9)	0–10	US Thionville Lusitanos (5)
76.	JS Audunoise (8)	1–1 (5–3 p)	CSO Amnéville (6)
77.	AS Entrange (11)	2–3	USB Longwy (9)
78.	CS Godbrange (9)	0–2	US Yutz (7)
79.	Olympic Saint Charles Haucourt (10)	3–5	ES Marange-Silvange (8)
80.	AS Bliesbruck (9)	4–0	CS Wittring (10)
81.	Étoile Naborienne Saint-Avold (7)	0–0 (5–4 p)	US Nousseviller (7)
82.	CO Bouzonville (9)	0–6	SSEP Hombourg-Haut (6)
83.	AS Réding (8)	1–3	CA Boulay (6)
84.	FC Rohrbach Bining (10)	1–4	US Forbach (6)
85.	ES Rimling-Erching-Obergailbach (10)	1–1 (5–4 p)	FC Freyming (8)
86.	US Rémering Villing (10)	5–0	FC Hambach (9)
87.	Entente Neufgrange-Siltzheim (11)	1–2	Sportive Lorquinoise (9)
88.	FC Abreschviller (10)	2–2 (4–2 p)	US Valmont (8)
89.	US Farébersviller 05 (8)	12–0	FC Coume (9)
90.	FC Longeville-lès-Saint-Avold (8)	3–2	AS Kalhausen (9)
91.	SO Merlebach (7)	3–2	AS Morhange (7)
92.	SC L'Hôpital (11)	1–1 (3–4 p)	US Alsting-Spicheren (9)
93.	US Woustviller (10)	0–7	Sarreguemines FC (6)
94.	EFT Sarrebourg (10)	0–2	Achen-Etting-Schmittviller (7)
95.	AS Hohengœft (10)	0–0 (4–3 p)	AS Hochfelden (8)
96.	FC Dossenheim-sur-Zinsel (10)	1–3	FC Saverne (9)
97.	FC Schweighouse-sur-Moder (7)	2–1	SC Drulingen (8)
98.	ASI Avenir (7)	3–1	FC Truchtersheim (8)
99.	Entente Trois Maisons-Phalsbourg (9)	4–3	AS Butten-Diemeringen (7)
100.	FC Kindwiller (11)	1–6	US Sarre-Union (5)
101.	US Wittersheim (8)	3–1	FC Obermodern (6)
102.	FC Dahlenheim (8)	2–6	US Reipertswiller (6)
103.	FC Wingersheim (9)	1–1 (17–16 p)	AS Ohlungen (7)
104.	AS Ingwiller/Menchhoffen (8)	7–1	FC Sarralbe (9)
105.	ASLC Berstett (12)	1–4	CSIE Harskirchen (11)
106.	FC Steinseltz (8)	3–1	FC Mothern (8)
107.	AS Mundolsheim (8)	0–0 (2–4 p)	US Schleithal (8)
108.	AS Kilstett (11)	0–7	FCE Schirrhein (7)
109.	FC Niederlauterbach (10)	2–2 (4–5 p)	FC Saint-Etienne Seltz (8)
110.	La Wantzenau FC (10)	0–3	SC Schiltigheim (6)
111.	Entente Kaltenhouse/Marienthal (8)	1–2	FC Weitbruch (9)
112.	AS Herrlisheim (11)	0–6	SS Weyersheim (6)
113.	AS Hunspach (8)	1–2	US Oberlauterbach (6)
114.	FC Soufflenheim (11)	1–2	FC Scheibenhard (7)
115.	AS Wœrth (11)	0–7	FC Drusenheim (7)
116.	AS Neudorf (8)	0–0 (4–5 p)	FC Kronenbourg Strasbourg (6)
117.	ASE Cité de l'Ill Strasbourg (9)	2–4	AS Menora Strasbourg (7)
118.	US Dachstein (10)	1–1 (4–5 p)	AS Elsau Portugais Strasbourg (8)
119.	FC Oberhausbergen (10)	1–3	AJF Hautepierre (8)
120.	CA Plobsheim (12)	0–1	AS Strasbourg (9)
121.	US Ittenheim (8)	0–1	USL Duppigheim (9)
122.	SR Hoenheim (9)	0–2	FCO Strasbourg Koenigshoffen 06 (5)
123.	FC Eckbolsheim (9)	1–6	FC Soleil Bischheim (6)
124.	AS Ribeauvillé (8)	1–3	FC Geispolsheim 01 (6)
125.	Entente Sportive Haslach-Urmatt-Grendelbruch (13)	1–4	US Baldenheim (9)
126.	FCSR Obernai (7)	3–3 (5–4 p)	FA Illkirch Graffenstaden (6)
127.	AS Portugais Sélestat (10)	5–1	AS Bergbieten (11)
128.	FC Dangolsheim (11)	3–0	FC Illhaeusern (7)
129.	FC Ebersmunster (13)	0–8	AS Erstein (7)
130.	ASC Saint-Pierre-Bois/Triembach-au-Val (10)	0–1	US Scherwiller (7)
131.	FC Rosheim (12)	0–3	Association Still-Mutzig (6)
132.	AS Wisches-Russ-Lutzelhouse (11)	0–2	AS Bischoffsheim (9)
133.	ASB Schirmeck-La Broque (10)	1–1 (9–10 p)	ES Molsheim-Ernolsheim (6)
134.	AS Sundhoffen (7)	2–2 (1–3 p)	FC Mulhouse (6)
135.	FC Ingersheim (9)	0–1	FC Hirtzfelden (8)
136.	FC Réguisheim (10)	3–5	FC Rouffach (8)
137.	FC Fessenheim (9)	2–3	FC Hégenheim (6)
138.	FC Ungersheim (11)	1–3	FC Bennwihr (9)
139.	AS Aspach-le-Haut (10)	0–0 (5–6 p)	Cernay FC (9)
140.	FC Wintzfelden-Osenbach (7)	0–4	Racing HW 96 (8)
141.	FC Heiteren (10)	2–2 (2–4 p)	AGIIR Florival (8)
142.	SR Widensolen (10)	2–5	FC Ostheim-Houssen (9)
143.	AS Sigolsheim (12)	1–2	US Oberbruck Dolleren (10)
144.	FC Kingersheim (8)	6–0	Union Carspach-Hirtzbach (9)
145.	Entente Hagenbach-Balschwiller (10)	1–5	ASL Kœtzingue (7)
146.	AS Coteaux Mulhouse (10)	6–0	SS Zillisheim (8)
147.	FC Uffheim (9)	0–2	AS Huningue (6)
148.	FC Bartenheim (7)	2–3	FC Saint-Louis Neuweg (6)
149.	FC Seppois-Bisel (10)	0–6	AS Illzach Modenheim (6)
150.	FC Riedisheim (8)	2–2 (5–4 p)	AS Blotzheim (7)
151.	FC Morschwiller-le-Bas (9)	3–4	SC Ottmarsheim (8)
152.	FC Anatolie Mulhouse (10)	2–9	Mulhouse Foot Réunis (8)
153.	US Wittenheim (7)	1–3	AS Theodore Ruelisheim Wittenheim (8)

=== Fourth round ===
These matches were played on 30 September and 1 October 2023.

Fourth Round Results: Grand Est
Tie no	Home team (Tier)	Score	Away team (Tier)
1.	AS Hohengœft (10)	0–0 (2–4 p)	FC Scheibenhard (7)
2.	FC Weitbruch (9)	3–2	ASI Avenir (7)
3.	FCE Schirrhein (7)	2–1	US Wittersheim (8)
4.	FC Wingersheim (9)	0–1	FC Schweighouse-sur-Moder (7)
5.	US Reipertswiller (6)	3–1	SS Weyersheim (6)
6.	US Schleithal (8)	1–1 (3–4 p)	Entente Trois Maisons-Phalsbourg (9)
7.	FC Drusenheim (7)	1–2	AS Ingwiller/Menchhoffen (8)
8.	FC Steinseltz (8)	3–3 (5–6 p)	US Oberlauterbach (6)
9.	FC Saint-Etienne Seltz (8)	0–0 (2–4 p)	FCSR Haguenau (4)
10.	CSIE Harskirchen (11)	3–1	FC Saverne (9)
11.	US Sarre-Union (5)	5–0	SC Schiltigheim (6)
12.	US Baldenheim (9)	1–6	ES Molsheim-Ernolsheim (6)
13.	AS Portugais Sélestat (10)	1–2	AS Erstein (7)
14.	FC Dangolsheim (11)	0–2	SR Colmar (4)
15.	USL Duppigheim (9)	0–4	AS Bischoffsheim (9)
16.	AJF Hautepierre (8)	2–4	Racing HW 96 (8)
17.	US Scherwiller (7)	1–2	FCO Strasbourg Koenigshoffen 06 (5)
18.	AS Menora Strasbourg (7)	0–3	FCSR Obernai (7)
19.	FC Soleil Bischheim (6)	1–0	FC Kronenbourg Strasbourg (6)
20.	AS Strasbourg (9)	1–5	FC Geispolsheim 01 (6)
21.	AS Elsau Portugais Strasbourg (8)	0–1	Association Still-Mutzig (6)
22.	AS Theodore Ruelisheim Wittenheim (8)	1–1 (5–3 p)	FC Ostheim-Houssen (9)
23.	Mulhouse Foot Réunis (8)	0–3	FC Mulhouse (6)
24.	FC Riedisheim (8)	0–6	AS Huningue (6)
25.	US Oberbruck Dolleren (10)	0–8	FC Saint-Louis Neuweg (6)
26.	FC Hégenheim (6)	2–2 (3–5 p)	AS Illzach Modenheim (6)
27.	ASL Kœtzingue (7)	5–1	FC Kingersheim (8)
28.	FC Bennwihr (9)	1–1 (3–4 p)	SC Ottmarsheim (8)
29.	Cernay FC (9)	0–4	ASC Biesheim (4)
30.	AS Coteaux Mulhouse (10)	2–1	AGIIR Florival (8)
31.	FC Rouffach (8)	0–1	FC Hirtzfelden (8)
32.	Espérance Gerbéviller (10)	0–0 (1–4 p)	COS Villers (7)
33.	SR Saint-Dié (7)	3–0 (Note: Tie reversed from original draw.)	AS Villey-Saint Étienne (8)
34.	FC Amerey Xertigny (9)	1–2	US Vandœuvre (7)
35.	AJS René II (10)	1–4	AS Saint-Nabord (8)
36.	Jarville JF (6)	3–0	Entente Centre Ornain (7)
37.	FC Des Ballons (9)	0–0 (3–4 p)	ES Heillecourt (7)
38.	US Behonne-Longeville-en-Barois (8)	0–6	FC Éloyes (7)
39.	ENJ Val-de-Seille (8)	1–3	ES Thaon (5)
40.	FC Saint-Max-Essey (8)	3–1	CS Charmes (9)
41.	AS Nomexy-Vincey (10)	0–0 (3–2 p)	GS Neuves-Maisons (6)
42.	EF Delme-Solgne (9)	0–8	ES Villerupt-Thil (6)
43.	JS Metz Scy-Chazelles (11)	3–2	USB Longwy (9)
44.	Athletic Cuvry Augny (9)	1–1 (4–5 p) (Note: AS Haut-du-Lièvre Nancy penalised for fielding too many transferred players, Athletic Cuvry Augny qualify.)	AS Haut-du-Lièvre Nancy (9)
45.	Entente Vigneulles-Hannonville-Fresne (8)	1–2	CS Veymerange (8)
46.	ES Marange-Silvange (8)	4–1	US Jarny (8)
47.	AS Algrange (7)	0–1	FC Hagondange (7)
48.	APM Metz (6)	6–0	US Yutz (7)
49.	FC Trémery (8)	1–5	US Raon-l'Étape (5)
50.	FC Hettange-Grande (7)	0–0 (3–5 p)	JS Audunoise (8)
51.	AS Pagny-sur-Moselle (6)	2–0	Val de l'Orne FC (7)
52.	Achen-Etting-Schmittviller (7)	5–0	FC Longeville-lès-Saint-Avold (8)
53.	ES Rimling-Erching-Obergailbach (10)	2–3	Étoile Naborienne Saint-Avold (7)
54.	CA Boulay (6)	1–3	US Thionville Lusitanos (5)
55.	US Farébersviller 05 (8)	1–4	US Forbach (6)
56.	FC Yutz (7)	4–0	FC Devant-les-Ponts Metz (8)
57.	FC Abreschviller (10)	0–4	SSEP Hombourg-Haut (6)
58.	Sportive Lorquinoise (9)	0–7	Sarreguemines FC (6)
59.	US Rémering Villing (10)	3–3 (4–1 p)	AS Talange (8)
60.	US Alsting-Spicheren (9)	0–2	AS Bliesbruck (9)
61.	RS Magny (7)	2–1	SO Merlebach (7)
62.	Nord Champagne FC (8)	0–2	EF Reims Sainte-Anne (5)
63.	Espérance Rémoise (8)	1–1 (5–4 p)	FC Christo (7)
64.	Olympique Charleville Neufmanil Aiglemont (7)	1–1 (5–4 p)	AS Prix-lès-Mézières (5)
65.	AS Asfeld (7)	0–3	Reims Murigny Franco Portugais (8)
66.	AS Gueux (10)	3–3 (16–17 p)	Bétheny FC (8)
67.	Rethel SF (7)	2–0	AS Cernay-Berru-Lavannes (7)
68.	Cheveuges-Saint-Aignan CO (9)	0–4	CS Sedan Ardennes (8)
69.	AS Bourg-Rocroi (9)	1–2	FC Bogny (6)
70.	AS Val de l'Aisne (8)	1–2	ES Fagnières (6)
71.	Bar-le-Duc FC (7)	0–1	FC Métropole Troyenne (5)
72.	SC Marnaval (6)	1–1 (4–5 p)	Chaumont FC (6)
73.	CS Chalindrey (8)	1–4	FC Nogentais (6)
74.	US Éclaron (7)	2–1	FC Vallant/Les Grès (8)
75.	Stade Chevillonnais (8)	1–5	FC Saint-Meziery (6)
76.	Bar-sur-Aube FC (8)	1–1 (3–4 p)	Romilly Champagne FC (9)
77.	US Montier-en-Der (8)	0–1	FC Côte des Blancs (7)
78.	ASPTT Chaumont (8)	4–0	AS Chartreux (9)

=== Fifth round ===
These matches were played on 14 and 15 October 2023.

Fifth Round Results: Grand Est
Tie no	Home team (Tier)	Score	Away team (Tier)
1.	JS Audunoise (8)	1–1 (3–1 p)	CS Veymerange (8)
2.	JS Metz Scy-Chazelles (11)	0–5	ES Villerupt-Thil (6)
3.	CS Sedan Ardennes (8)	2–3	EF Reims Sainte-Anne (5)
4.	Reims Murigny Franco Portugais (8)	2–2 (2–3 p)	ES Fagnières (6)
5.	Espérance Rémoise (8)	0–3	FC Bogny (6)
6.	ES Marange-Silvange (8)	0–4	SAS Épinal (3)
7.	Bétheny FC (8)	0–2	FC Côte des Blancs (7)
8.	FC Hagondange (7)	2–1	Olympique Charleville Neufmanil Aiglemont (7)
9.	APM Metz (6)	4–0	FC Yutz (7)
10.	Rethel SF (7)	0–2	US Thionville Lusitanos (5)
11.	US Rémering Villing (10)	0–0 (4–2 p)	Achen-Etting-Schmittviller (7)
12.	Étoile Naborienne Saint-Avold (7)	0–4	SSEP Hombourg-Haut (6)
13.	FC Weitbruch (9)	0–3	FCE Schirrhein (7)
14.	FC Scheibenhard (7)	0–1	US Sarre-Union (5)
15.	AS Bliesbruck (9)	0–6	Sarreguemines FC (6)
16.	AS Ingwiller/Menchhoffen (8)	0–3	FCSR Haguenau (4)
17.	US Oberlauterbach (6)	0–3	US Forbach (6)
18.	CSIE Harskirchen (11)	0–4	US Reipertswiller (6)
19.	RS Magny (7)	0–2	SR Colmar (4)
20.	Entente Trois Maisons-Phalsbourg (9)	0–2	FC Schweighouse-sur-Moder (7)
21.	AS Coteaux Mulhouse (10)	0–2	FC Geispolsheim 01 (6)
22.	AS Illzach Modenheim (6)	3–0	AS Huningue (6)
23.	SC Ottmarsheim (8)	0–4	Association Still-Mutzig (6)
24.	ES Molsheim-Ernolsheim (6)	1–1 (4–5 p)	FC Saint-Louis Neuweg (6)
25.	FC Mulhouse (6)	2–1	US Raon-l'Étape (5)
26.	FC Soleil Bischheim (6)	2–0	ASL Kœtzingue (7)
27.	AS Bischoffsheim (9)	0–2	ASC Biesheim (4)
28.	FCSR Obernai (7)	7–0	Racing HW 96 (8)
29.	FC Hirtzfelden (8)	0–1	AS Erstein (7)
30.	AS Theodore Ruelisheim Wittenheim (8)	1–0	FCO Strasbourg Koenigshoffen 06 (5)
31.	US Vandœuvre (7)	0–0 (2–4 p)	Jarville JF (6)
32.	ES Thaon (5)	1–0	AS Nancy Lorraine (3)
33.	COS Villers (7)	0–4	FC Éloyes (7)
34.	Romilly Champagne FC (9)	0–4	SR Saint-Dié (7)
35.	FC Saint-Max-Essey (8)	0–0 (4–5 p)	Chaumont FC (6)
36.	US Éclaron (7)	0–1	AS Pagny-sur-Moselle (6)
37.	Athletic Cuvry Augny (9)	2–2 (3–0 p)	ES Heillecourt (7)
38.	AS Saint-Nabord (8)	0–5	FC Métropole Troyenne (5)
39.	ASPTT Chaumont (8)	1–3	FC Nogentais (6)
40.	AS Nomexy-Vincey (10)	1–2	FC Saint-Meziery (6)

=== Sixth round ===
These matches were played on 28 and 29 October 2023.

Sixth Round Results: Grand Est
Tie no	Home team (Tier)	Score	Away team (Tier)
1.	FC Bogny (6)	0–0 (4–5 p)	ES Villerupt-Thil (6)
2.	Athletic Cuvry Augny (9)	0–3	EF Reims Sainte-Anne (5)
3.	FC Métropole Troyenne (5)	3–1	FC Nogentais (6)
4.	Chaumont FC (6)	3–1	FC Côte des Blancs (7)
5.	JS Audunoise (8)	0–4	SAS Épinal (3)
6.	ES Fagnières (6)	0–1	ES Thaon (5)
7.	FC Éloyes (7)	1–2	Jarville JF (6)
8.	AS Pagny-sur-Moselle (6)	0–4	APM Metz (6)
9.	SR Saint-Dié (7)	0–1	US Thionville Lusitanos (5)
10.	FC Saint-Meziery (6)	3–2	FC Hagondange (7)
11.	US Rémering Villing (10)	0–7	SSEP Hombourg-Haut (6)
12.	Sarreguemines FC (6)	4–0	US Reipertswiller (6)
13.	Association Still-Mutzig (6)	1–1 (2–4 p)	FC Mulhouse (6)
14.	FC Saint-Louis Neuweg (6)	1–1 (2–4 p)	FCSR Haguenau (4)
15.	FCSR Obernai (7)	0–7	SR Colmar (4)
16.	US Sarre-Union (5)	2–1	AS Illzach Modenheim (6)
17.	FCE Schirrhein (7)	1–2	FC Geispolsheim 01 (6)
18.	FC Soleil Bischheim (6)	0–4	ASC Biesheim (4)
19.	AS Erstein (7)	1–3	US Forbach (6)
20.	FC Schweighouse-sur-Moder (7)	2–1	AS Theodore Ruelisheim Wittenheim (8)
