= FCSR Obernai =

French football club

- Full name: Football Club des Sports Réunis Obernai
- Founded: 1919
- Ground: Stade Municipal d'Obernai, Obernai
- Capacity: 500
- League: Championnat de France Amateurs 2
- 2007-2008: Championnat de France Amateurs 2 Group B, 16th

Football Club des Sports Réunis Obernai is a French football club based in Obernai, Bas-Rhin. It was founded in 1919. The club plays in Division d'Honneur, the sixth tier of the French football league system; they relegated from Championnat de France Amateurs 2 Group B after the 2007-08 season, having finished last.

== History ==
The club was founded in 1919 under the name GSO Obernai. The club soon changed its name to FC Obernai, and this was the name of the club until 1945, when the current name was adopted. Currently, the club has almost 300 players in 15 teams in seven age groups, from under-7s to the senior team. The club has access to 3 grass pitches and a training ground. In 2006, a synthetic pitch was laid at the Stade Municipal, the only one of its kind in the area.

The senior team members have been confined to playing in regional leagues, with their highest league elevation was in the 2007-08 season, when they promoted to the Championnat de France Amateurs 2 (CFA2), the fifth tier of the French football league system. They finished bottom of their group by 12 points, and relegated to Division d'Honneur.
