= 2019–20 Coupe de France preliminary rounds, Grand Est =

The 2019–20 Coupe de France preliminary rounds, Grand Est was the qualifying competition to decide which teams from the leagues of the Grand Est region of France took part in the main competition from the seventh round.

A total of 19 teams qualified from the Grand Est preliminary rounds. In 2018–19, three teams made it as far as the round of 64. SC Schiltigheim lost to Dijon, US Raon-l'Étape lost to Iris Club de Croix and Olympique Strasbourg lost to Saint-Étienne.

== Schedule ==
The first round of the qualifying competition took place during the 2018–19 season, during June 2019. It consisted of 698 clubs from the district leagues (tier 9 and below of the French league system) with some clubs from the Régional 3 division (tier 8) to shape the draw.

The second round took place in August, with most ties on the weekend of 18 August, and the remainder on the weekend of 25 August. 120 teams, mainly from tiers 7 (Régional 2) and 8 (Régional 3) with two from tier 6 (Régional 1), join at this stage. One team, ASTR Wittenheim, gained re-entry as a Lucky loser due to mergers and liquidations of clubs that have taken place between the first and second rounds.

The third round draw was made on 29 August 2019. The remaining 12 Régional 2, the remaining 36 Régional 1 teams and the 11 Championnat National 3 (tier 5) teams joined at this stage. One second round winner, Foyer Barsequanais, received a bye to the fourth round.

The fourth round draw was made on 18 September 2019. The five Championnat National 2 (tier 4) teams joined at this stage. 76 ties were drawn.

The fifth round draw was made on 2 October 2019. 38 ties were drawn.

The sixth round draw was made on 16 October 2019. 19 ties were drawn.

=== First round ===
The first round was split into the separate competitions for the three sub-regions of Champagne-Ardenne, Lorraine and Alsace.

==== First round: Champagne-Ardenne ====
These matches were played between 7 and 16 June 2019. Tiers shown reflect the 2018–19 season.

First round results: Grand Est - Champagne-Ardenne
Tie no	Home team (tier)	Score	Away team (tier)
1.	ASR Raucourt (11)	2–3	JS Remilly-Aillicourt (10)
2.	AS Charleville Franco-Turque (9)	0–3 (Note: Tie won by means of forfeit.)	ES Vouziers (9)
3.	ES Saulces-Monclin (10)	2–0	FC Allobais Doncherois (8)
4.	AS Pouru-aux-Bois (11)	2–5	AS Sault-lès-Rethel (11)
5.	FC Haybes (9)	2–3	Nord Ardennes (8)
6.	Cheveuges-St Aignan CO	4–0	US Fumay-Charnois (8)
7.	AS Tagnon (11)	2–1	CA Monthermé (10)
8.	FC Maubert-Fontaine (11)	4–0	US Margut (11)
9.	ES Auvillers/Signy-le-Petit (11)	0–2	USC Nouvion-sur-Meuse (9)
10.	FC Porcien (8)	4–1	AS Mouzon (8)
11.	AS Neuville-lès-This (8)	1–4	AS Bourg-Rocroi (8)
12.	QV Douzy (8)	0–1	ES Charleville-Mézières (9)
13.	FC Blagny-Carignan (9)	0–1	US Balan (9)
14.	AS Lumes (10)	1–5	Liart-Signy-l'Abbaye FC (8)
15.	Olympique Torcy-Sedan (8)	3–0 (Note: Tie reversed from original draw.)	Floing FC (9)
16.	US Revin (9)	3–0	US St Menges (10)
17.	Étoile Chapelaine (9)	3–0	Étoile Lusigny (9)
18.	AS Droupt-St Basle (11)	0–4	AS Chartreux (10)
19.	ES Celles-Essoyes (9)	0–3	JS Vaudoise (9)
20.	Alliance Sud-Ouest Football Aubois (8)	1–0	Rosières Omnisports (8)
21.	FC Traînel (9)	2–0	FC Vallant/Les Grès (9)
22.	AS Portugaise Nogent-sur-Seine (9)	4–1	US Maizières-Chartres (8)
23.	CS Trois Vallées (9)	4–1	AS Marigny-St Martin (10)
24.	UJ Méryciennes (9)	3–0	Stade Briennois (9)
25.	ESC Melda (8)	0–1	ES Municipaux Troyes (8)
26.	SC Savières (10)	1–0	US Vendeuvre (8)
27.	FC Malgache (8)	5–1 (a.e.t.)	Renouveau Ramerupt (8)
28.	AS Tertre (9)	3–3 (2–4 p)	Amicale Bagneux-Clesles (10)
29.	ES Witry-les-Reims (8)	0–2	US Oiry (9)
30.	US Fismes (8)	2–0	Reims Murigny Franco Portugais (9)
31.	AS St Brice-Courcelles (10)	0–3	Foyer Compertrix (9)
32.	ES Pierry-Moussy (11)	0–3	USS Sermaize (10)
33.	US Couvrot (10)	1–3	AS Courtisols ESTAN (8)
34.	Olympique FC Reims (12)	2–4	FCF La Neuvillette-Jamin (8)
35.	Bétheny FC (10)	5–2	FC Sillery (10)
36.	FC St Martin-sur-le-Pré/La Veuve/Recy (9)	6–2	FC Bignicourier (10)
37.	AS Gueux (10)	0–3	Vitry FC (8)
38.	AS Marolles (10)	4–2 (Note: AS Marolles penalised for unknown reasons. FC Pargny-sur-Saulx qualify.)	FC Pargny-sur-Saulx (10)
39.	ES Muizonnaise (11)	3–2 (a.e.t.)	SC Dormans (10)
40.	Arden 51 FC (12)	2–1	US Damery (10)
41.	SC de la Suippe (10)	1–1 (2–4 p)	FC Turcs Épernay (8)
42.	Argonne FC (8)	0–1	CS Agéen (8)
43.	SC Montmirail (10)	1–3	ES Gault-Soigny (11)
44.	AS Cheminon (10)	0–3	US Esternay (10)
45.	Espérance Rémoise (8)	0–8	ES Fagnières (9)
46.	Entente Somsois Margerie St Utin (10)	0–2	AS Champigny (10)
47.	ES Connantre-Corroy (10)	2–5	US Thiéblemont-Farémont (11)
48.	AS Cheminots Chàlons-sur-Marne (10)	1–5 (a.e.t.)	FC Côte des Blancs (8)
49.	US Condes (11)	2–5	CA Rolampontais (8)
50.	FC Villiers-en-Lieu (10)	1–1 (4–3 p)	US Biesles (10)
51.	US Rouvres Canton d'Auberive (11)	1–6	Foyer Bayard (11)
52.	US Fayl-Billot/Hortes (9)	1–3	CS Chalindrey (9)
53.	ES Corgirnon-Chaudenay (11)	2–4	CS Maranville-Rennepont (9)
54.	CO Langres (10)	3–1	US Bourbonnaise (10)
55.	St Gilles FC (12)	1–2 (a.e.t.)	FCCS Bragard (10)
56.	FC Bologne (10)	1–0 (a.e.t.)	ASPTT Chaumont (9)
57.	CS Doulaincourt-Saucourt (10)	2–2 (6–7 p)	US Montier-en-Der (8)
58.	FC Laville-aux-Bois (10)	1–2	FC Prez Bourmont (8)
59.	AS Poissons-Noncourt (9)	7–0	AS Luzy-Verbiesles-Foulain (9)
60.	AF Valcourt (10)	2–1	JS Louvemont (10)
61.	FC Châteauvillain (10)	0–1 (a.e.t.)	ES Prauthoy-Vaux (8)
62.	US Wassy-Brousseval (11)	2–0	SR Neuilly-l'Évêque (9)
63.	FC Joinville-Vecqueville (9)	3–0	DS Eurville-Bienville (9)
64.	ES Andelot-Rimaucourt-Bourdons (8)	0–1 (a.e.t.)	Espérance St Dizier (8)

==== First round: Lorraine ====
These matches were played between 8 and 30 June 2019. Tiers shown reflect the 2018–19 season.

First round results: Grand Est - Lorraine
Tie no	Home team (tier)	Score	Away team (tier)
1.	FC St Amé-Julienrupt (11)	0–4	FC Des Ballons (9)
2.	AS Ramonchamp (11)	2–1	FC Granges-sur-Vologne (10)
3.	ES Haute Meurthe (10)	5–0	FC Haute Moselotte (10)
4.	FC Uriménil-Uzemain (11)	2–6	FC Ajolais (11)
5.	FC Vierge (12)	5–7	AS Plombières (10)
6.	US Val de Saône (11)	1–1 (4–5 p)	US Lamarche (10)
7.	SM Bruyères (11)	1–3	AS Gérardmer (8)
8.	US Arches-Archettes-Raon (10)	0–1	AS St Nabord (9)
9.	FC Amerey Xertigny (10)	0–2	ES Aviere Darnieulles (9)
10.	SC Contrisson (10)	3–1	ES Tilly-Ambly Villers-Bouquemont (9)
11.	AS Baudonvilliers (10)	1–4	FC Fains-Véel (9)
12.	AS Darney (11)	2–4	FC Charmois-l'Orgueilleux (11)
13.	AS Stenay-Mouzay (10)	1–2	FC Othe-Montmédy (9)
14.	RC Sommedieue (11)	3–3 (4–5 p)	FC Revigny (10)
15.	AS Cheniménil (11)	1–3	FC Éloyes (8)
16.	AS Padoux (10)	2–1 (a.e.t.)	FC Hadol-Dounoux (9)
17.	ASC Montiers-sur-Saulx (11)	1–0	AS Val d'Ornain (10)
18.	FC Val Dunois (11)	1–5	US Thierville (9)
19.	ASCC Seuil-d'Argonne (10)	0–1 (a.e.t.)	ES Lérouvillois Cheminote (10)
20.	FJEP Magnières (10)	1–3	Saulcy FC (9)
21.	US Behonne-Longeville-en-Barois (10)	1–0	AS Tréveray (9)
22.	AS Colombey (11)	6–1	FC Neufchâteau-Liffol (9)
23.	ASC Dompaire (11)	1–6	AS Nomexy-Vincey (8)
24.	ES Michelloise (11)	1–6	SR Saint-Dié (8)
25.	LSC Portieux (11)	2–1	Dogneville FC (10)
26.	Gars de l'Ornois Gondrecourt (11)	1–8	Entente Sud 54 (11)
27.	GS Vézelise (11)	3–1	AS Gironcourt (9)
28.	AS Rehaincourt (11)	0–0 (4–2 p)	US Mirecourt-Hymont (10)
29.	US Lexy (9)	1–2	ES Longuyon (8)
30.	SM Etival (10)	2–0	Entente Bru-Jeanménil SBH (9)
31.	ES Gorcy-Cosnes (10)	4–1	Entente Réhon Villers Morfontaine (9)
32.	FC Belleray (10)	3–4	FC Dugny (9)
33.	AS Rehainviller Hériménil (10)	2–6 (a.e.t.)	CS Charmes (9)
34.	Lorraine Vaucouleurs (10)	10–1	AS Velaine-en-Haye (12)
35.	US Jarny (9)	3–0 (Note: Tie won by means of forfeit.)	AS Dieue-Sommedieue (8)
36.	ES Crusnes (9)	2–4	USL Mont St Martin (8)
37.	ES Cons-Ugny Val de Chiers (10)	0–4	USB Longwy (9)
38.	CSP Réhon (10)	2–1	CS Godbrange (8)
39.	US Beuveille (11)	1–2	ACS Herserange (10)
40.	FC Vignot (11)	2–4	ES Maizey-Lacroix (9)
41.	AS Dommartin-lès-Toul (10)	0–1	SC Commercy (9)
42.	Entente Petit-Réderching Siersthal (10)	3–4	AS Mouterhouse (9)
43.	ES Badonviller-Celles (11)	1–0	FC Troisfontaines (9)
44.	Saint-Louis 2017 (12)	0–4	Entente Schorbach Hottviller Volmunster 13 (10)
45.	FC Cirey-sur-Vezouze (11)	1–6	SC Baccarat (9)
46.	FC Montois (11)	1–3	ES Bayon-Roville (10)
47.	SR Langatte (11)	1–5	Montagnarde Walscheid (9)
48.	US Schneckenbusch (11)	1–3	FC Hommert (10)
49.	Entente Neufgrange-Siltzheim (10)	1–4	US Goetzenbruck-Meisenthal (9)
50.	FC Lemberg-St Louis (10)	1–5	FC Beausoleil Sarreguemines (10)
51.	FC Dannelbourg (9)	1–0 (a.e.t.)	EFT Sarrebourg (8)
52.	Olympique Mittelbronn 04 (11)	0–3	AS Brouviller (9)
53.	ES Ormersviller-Epping (10)	2–3	AS Bliesbruck (9)
54.	USF Brouderdorff (10)	0–4	Sportive Lorquinoise (9)
55.	FC Sarralbe (10)	3–0	AS Montbronn (9)
56.	AS Réchicourt-le-Château (11)	3–2	AS MJC Blâmont (9)
57.	US Rouhling (10)	2–2 (1–4 p)	FC Rohrbach-Bining (9)
58.	Omnisports Frouard Pompey (11)	0–3	Toul JCA (8)
59.	CS Wittring (10)	2–4	FC Rahling (9)
60.	FC Istanbul Sarreguemines (10)	3–8	ES Gros Réderching-Bettviller (9)
61.	FC Toul (9)	12–1	FC Richardménil-Flavigny-Méréville-Messein (10)
62.	ES Vermois (12)	0–2	FC Écrouves (9)
63.	ES Avricourt Moussey (10)	0–6	AS Laneuveville Marainviller (9)
64.	AS Vibersviller (12)	3–1	SS Hilbesheim (10)
65.	AF Einville (12)	0–16	ES Lunéville Sixte (8)
66.	US Roth (10)	5–2 (a.e.t.)	AS Kalhausen (9)
67.	AJS René II (10)	2–6	MJC Pichon (9)
68.	Olympique Haussonville (11)	1–2	Stade Flévillois (9)
69.	FC Houdemont (9)	0–6	AS Ludres (8)
70.	ASPTT Nancy (12)	3–1 (a.e.t.)	AS Varangéville-St Nicolas (10)
71.	ES Laneuveville (9)	3–3 (4–3 p)	AS Haut-du-Lièvre Nancy (8)
72.	FR Faulx (11)	1–4	ASC Saulxures-lès-Nancy (9)
73.	Maxéville FC (10)	1–3	AF Laxou Sapinière (8)
74.	FC Seichamps (10)	0–3	SC Malzéville (9)
75.	AS Rech (11)	0–3	US Holving (9)
76.	US Bousbach (11)	1–2	AS Neunkirch (9)
77.	ES Custines-Malleloy (9)	2–1	AS Grand Couronné (8)
78.	FC Diefenbach (11)	1–4	AS Le Val-de-Guéblange (9)
79.	FC Francaltroff (11)	0–2	FC Dieuze (9)
80.	FC Farschviller (10)	1–3	SO Ippling (9)
81.	ES Schœneck (11)	0–5	US Alsting-Zinzing (9)
82.	US Hundling (11)	1–4	FC Metzing (9)
83.	JS Bischwald (10)	3–4	SC Vic-sur-Seille (9)
84.	AS Teting-sur-Nied (11)	1–3	GS Nébing (9)
85.	US Hilsprich (11)	1–3	AS Hellimer (8)
86.	ASC Œting (10)	1–3	US Spicheren (9)
87.	AS Kerbach (11)	4–2	US Morsbach (10)
88.	CS Stiring-Wendel (10)	5–3	CS Diebling (9)
89.	FC Creutzberg Forbach (9)	0–1	US Behren-lès-Forbach (8)
90.	FC Château-Salins (10)	0–3	EF Delme-Solgne (9)
91.	Alliance Cocheren-Rosbruck (9)	1–11	FC Freyming (8)
92.	AS Grostenquin Bérig Bistroff (10)	1–3	AS Seingbouse Betting Henriville (10)
93.	FC Loisy (12)	1–5	FC Dieulouard (11)
94.	FC Carling (9)	0–1	SO Merlebach (8)
95.	AS Guerting (10)	3–2	FC Hochwald (9)
96.	ASJA St Avold (10)	0–5	ES Macheren Petit-Ebersviller (8)
97.	FR Cheminot (11)	0–8	ENJ Val-de-Seille (9)
98.	FC L'Hôpital (11)	2–3	SR Creutzwald 03 (8)
99.	US Valmont (9)	6–0	FC Coume (9)
100.	AS Falck (11)	1–0	FC Folschviller (8)
101.	AJSE Montauville (10)	2–2 (5–4 p)	FC Novéant (8)
102.	AS Mars-la-Tour (12)	0–5	GS Thiaucourt (10)
103.	JS Ancy-sur-Moselle (11)	0–1	FC Pont-à-Mousson (9)
104.	FC Longeville-lès-St Avold (9)	4–2	MJC Volmerange-lès-Boulay (8)
105.	AS Peltre (11)	2–1	ES Faulquemont-Créhange (9)
106.	AS Anzeling Edling (10)	6–1	JS Rémering-lès-Hargarten (9)
107.	AS Schwerdorff (10)	2–3	CO Bouzonville (10)
108.	LS Vantoux (12)	1–7	JA Rémilly (8)
109.	JS Manom (10)	1–3	ESR Rémeling (9)
110.	RS Ottange-Nondkeil (11)	2–6	JS Audunoise (9)
111.	FC Verny-Louvigny-Cuvry (9)	3–4 (Note: Tie reversed from original draw.)	AS Corny (11)
112.	JS Rettel-Hunting (9)	1–6	ES Rosselange Vitry (9)
113.	JS Metz (11)	1–1 (4–5 p)	US Courcelles-Chaussy (9)
114.	AF Os Conquistadors Metz (10)	1–2	ES Courcelles-sur-Nied (9)
115.	AS Metz Grange aux Bois (11)	0–2	Excelsior Cuvry (9)
116.	CSJ Augny (10)	0–3	JS Ars-Laquenexy (9)
117.	US Ban-St Martin (9)	1–2	SC Marly (8)
118.	SC Moulins-lès-Metz (10)	– (Note: Match abandoned for unknown reason. US ACLI Metz penalised. SC Moulins-lès-Metz qualify.)	US ACLI Metz (11)
119.	Ars-sur-Moselle FC (12)	8–3	FC Woippy (9)
120.	AS Gravelotte (11)	0–9	US Conflans (9)
121.	US Châtel-St Germain (8)	3–0	AS Scy-Chazelles (11)
122.	AS Ay-sur-Moselle (11)	3–0	US Vigy (9)
123.	AS Tucquegnieux-Trieux (10)	2–3	US Fontoy (9)
124.	US Oudrenne (10)	3–0	US Kœnigsmacker (8)
125.	US Guentrange (10)	4–1	CS Volmerange-les-Mines (9)
126.	RC Nilvange (11)	2–4	Entente Bure-Boulange (9)
127.	US Cattenom (10)	1–4	ES Richemont (9)
128.	AS Konacker (10)	1–2	SC Terville (10)
129.	ES Haut Plateau Messin (11)	0–3	US Briey (8)
130.	ES Jœuf (8)	3–1	AJ Aubouésienne (9)
131.	JS Distroff (11)	3–1 (a.e.t.)	FC Vœlfling (10)
132.	AG Metzervisse (11)	18–0	FC Angevillers (11)
133.	ES Garche (11)	1–1 (6–5 p)	AS Florange-Ebange (9)
134.	US Illange (9)	1–2	AS Portugais St Francois Thionville (8)
135.	US Marspich (10)	7–2	AS Sœtrich (9)
136.	RS Serémange-Erzange (9)	1–2	TS Bertrange (9)
137.	FC Guénange (9)	4–2	FC Mondelange (9)
138.	US Yutz (9)	6–0	US Froidcul (8)
139.	AS Talange (10)	2–1 (a.e.t.)	ASC Basse-Ham (9)
140.	JSO Ennery (11)	2–5	ES Maizières (10)
141.	AS Les Côteaux (9)	2–3	AS Clouange (8)
142.	ES Marange-Silvange (10)	7–1	FC Pierrevillers (10)
143.	US Volkrange (10)	2–1	US Russange (10)

==== First round: Alsace ====
These matches were played between 30 May and 23 June 2019. Tiers shown reflect the 2018–19 season.

First round results: Grand Est - Alsace
Tie no	Home team (tier)	Score	Away team (tier)
1.	AS Andolsheim (11)	0–5	AS Mussig (10)
2.	US Artzenheim (13)	4–8	FCI Riquewihr (10)
3.	AS Aspach-le-Haut (10)	3–1	ASCCO Helfrantzkirch (11)
4.	FC Bantzenheim (8)	0–3 (Note: Tie won by means of forfeit.)	FC Brunstatt (9)
5.	FC Barr (13)	2–5	US Baldenheim (8)
6.	FC Batzendorf (13)	0–3	FC Oberhoffen (10)
7.	SS Beinheim (11)	3–1 (a.e.t.)	FC Eschbach (9)
8.	SR Bergheim (10)	1–3	US Nordhouse (8)
9.	ASLC Berstett (13)	1–6	La Wantzenau FC (10)
10.	FC Bindernheim (11)	2–0	FC Niederhergheim (9)
11.	FC Bischwiller (11)	0–1	AS Hunspach (8)
12.	FC Bisel (12)	1–1 (4–3 p)	AS Mertzen (9)
13.	AS Blodelsheim (11)	0–4	AS Munster (8)
14.	FC Boersch (11)	2–1	EB Achenheim (9)
15.	FC Bollwiller (13)	0–1	FC Buhl (11)
16.	FC Breuschwickersheim (10)	1–1 (1–3 p)	FC Marlenheim-Kirchheim (11)
17.	AS Burnhaupt-le-Bas (9)	1–7	FC Illfurth (10)
18.	AS Butten-Diemeringen (9)	2–1	AS Hochfelden (8)
19.	AS Châtenois (11)	4–3 (a.e.t.)	FC Matzenheim (11)
20.	AS Ribeauvillé (8)	3–0 (Note: Tie reversed from original draw.)	ASCF Colmar 2009 (12)
21.	US Dalhunden (12)	1–1 (2–4 p)	FC Geudertheim (9)
22.	FC Dambach Neunhoffen (12)	0–3	AS Mertzwiller (9)
23.	FC Dauendorf (12)	2–4	AS Platania Gundershoffen (8)
24.	SC Dettwiller (11)	4–1	FC Steinbourg (12)
25.	AS Dingsheim-Griesheim (12)	2–0 (Note: AS Dingsheim-Griesheim penalised. For fielding a suspended player, according to . FC Niederhausbergen qualify.)	FC Niederhausbergen (11)
26.	SC Dinsheim (12)	0–7	US Oberschaeffolsheim (8)
27.	SR Dorlisheim (12)	0–11	FC Dahlenheim (9)
28.	USL Duppigheim (9)	5–0	AP Joie et Santé Strasbourg (9)
29.	AS Durlinsdorf (11)	1–4	Entente Hagenbach-Balschwiller (9)
30.	FC Ebersmunster (15)	1–3	AS Pfaffenheim (9)
31.	FC Ensisheim (12)	1–5 (a.e.t.)	FC Grussenheim (10)
32.	FC Entzheim (10)	1–2	AS Pfulgriesheim (11)
33.	UJ Epfig (10)	3–3 (3–5 p) (Note: SR Widensolen penalised for unknown reasons. UJ Epfig qualify.)	SR Widensolen (11)
34.	AS Forstfeld (12)	5–3	Entente Drachenbronn-Birlenbach (13)
35.	Entente Laubach/Forstheim (12)	1–5	AS Wahlenheim-Bernolsheim (13)
36.	SR Furdenheim (9)	2–3	FC Eschau (9)
37.	FC Grendelbruch (12)	4–2	FC Dangolsheim (12)
38.	AS Guémar (9)	2–3	FC Heiteren (10)
39.	US Gumbrechtshoffen (11)	3–2	AS Uhrwiller (10)
40.	FC Gundolsheim (11)	– (Note: Match abandoned. FC Battenheim penalised for unknown reasons. FC Gundolsheim qualify.)	FC Battenheim (12)
41.	Fatih-Sport Haguenau (10)	0–2	FC Scheibenhard (10)
42.	US Hangenbieten (11)	3–2	AS Holtzheim (10)
43.	AS Hatten (12)	1–4	US Turcs Bischwiller (8)
44.	AS Hausgauen (11)	5–3 (a.e.t.)	FC Rosenau (10)
45.	AS Heiligenstein (11)	2–6	FC Colmar Unifié (11)
46.	US Hésingue (9)	2–3	Montreux Sports (8)
47.	AC Hinterfeld (12)	4–2	FC Kindwiller (11)
48.	AS Hochstatt (12)	2–1	FC Sentheim (9)
49.	FC Hoffen (13)	0–1	Entente Lembach/Wingen (12)
50.	AS Hohengœft (13)	7–2	FC Montagne Verte Strasbourg (11)
51.	AS Rixheim Ile-Napoléon (13)	3–2	St Georges Carspach (13)
52.	US Imbsheim (12)	2–0	FC Ernolsheim-lès-Saverne (12)
53.	US Innenheim (11)	0–3	US Dachstein (11)
54.	FR Jebsheim-Muntzenheim (11)	4–1	AS St Pierre-Bois/Triembach-au-Val (10)
55.	FC Kappelen (10)	2–0	US Oberbruck Dolleren (10)
56.	FC Kertzfeld (12)	1–4	FC Kogenheim (10)
57.	FC Keskastel (9)	2–2 (3–2 p)	AS Weyer (10)
58.	FC Krautergersheim (10)	0–1	ALFC Duttlenheim (8)
59.	AS Kurtzenhouse (12)	1–0	AS Kilstett (10)
60.	FC Lampertheim (9)	5–2	FA Val de Moder (10)
61.	FC Lampertsloch-Merkswiller (13)	3–2	Entente Schœnenbourg-Memmelshoffen (11)
62.	FC Lingolsheim (10)	2–1	Strasbourg Université Club (11)
63.	FC Lixhausen (13)	3–0	FC Marmoutier (12)
64.	AS Lupstein (9)	0–1 (a.e.t.)	AS Ingwiller/Menchhoffen (9)
65.	AS Lutterbach (9)	2–5	FC Wintzfelden-Osenbach (9)
66.	FC Mackwiller (11)	4–2 (Note: FC Mackwiller penalised for unknown reasons. US Ettendorf qualify.)	US Ettendorf (10)
67.	FC Masevaux (12)	3–0	US Landser (13)
68.	US Meistratzheim (13)	0–2	FC Portugais Colmar (12)
69.	FC Merxheim (9)	0–1	FC Kingersheim (9)
70.	US Mommenheim (11)	2–0	AS Wœrth (12)
71.	FC Monswiller (12)	1–5	ES Pfettisheim (9)
72.	Entente Mothern Munchhausen (10)	2–2 (4–5 p)	AS Gambsheim (8)
73.	Alliance Muespach-Folgensbourg (12)	1–1 (5–4 p)	FC Lauw (10)
74.	FC Mulhausen (13)	1–3	US Trois Maisons (9)
75.	Étoile Mulhouse (11)	2–1	AS Riespach (10)
76.	Mouloudia Mulhouse (8)	2–3 (a.e.t.)	SC Cernay (8)
77.	FC Munchhouse (10)	3–0	FC Sausheim (8)
78.	AS Mundolsheim (9)	3–1	OC Lipsheim (9)
79.	AS Mutzig (8)	1–0	US Hindisheim (9)
80.	AS Natzwiller (11)	1–3	AJF Hautepierre Strasbourg (10)
81.	US Niederbronn-les-Bains (17)	0–12	FC Wingersheim (9)
82.	FC Niederlauterbach (11)	1–4	FC Oberroedern/Aschbach (9)
83.	FC Niedermodern (13)	1–2	SC Rittershoffen (11)
84.	AS Niedernai (11)	3–4	AS Altorf (12)
85.	FC Niederrœdern/Olympique Schaffhouse (13)	2–5	FC Gries (13)
86.	FC Niederschaeffolsheim (11)	10–0	AS St Barthelemy Leutenheim (12)
87.	AS Niffer (10)	4–3	AS Raedersdorf (9)
88.	FC Oberhausbergen (10)	5–1	CS Neuhof Strasbourg (9)
89.	FC Obermorschwiller (10)	4–3	FC Seppois (9)
90.	ES Offendorf (13)	0–5	AS Betschdorf (8)
91.	FC Ostwald (10)	3–7	ASE Cité de l'Ill Strasbourg (8)
92.	CA Plobsheim (12)	0–2	FC Souffelweyersheim (8)
93.	US Preuschdorf-Langensoultzbach (10)	3–2 (a.e.t.)	FR Sessenheim-Stattmatten (9)
94.	FC Pfastatt 1926 (8)	2–2 (3–4 p)	US Pulversheim FC (10)
95.	AS Bischoffsheim (8)	2–0	FC Quatzenheim (12)
96.	FC Réguisheim (10)	2–4	FC Anatolie Mulhouse (11)
97.	FCE Reichshoffen (13)	2–6	ASL Duntzenheim (10)
98.	AS Reichstett (9)	1–3	SR Hoenheim (9)
99.	FC Blue Star Reiningue (10)	1–3	US Hirsingue (8)
100.	FC Rhinau (9)	4–2	RC Kintzheim (9)
101.	FCRS Richwiller (10)	4–1	AS Red Star Mulhouse (8)
102.	FC Roderen (10)	0–5	AS Altkirch (8)
103.	SC Rœschwoog	1–1 (3–4 p)	US Schleithal (8)
104.	Entente de la Mossig Wasselonne/Romanswiller (11)	0–4	ASB Schirmeck-La Broque (10)
105.	FC Rouffach (10)	3–2	FC Meyenheim (9)
106.	ALSC Rumersheim (12)	2–3	FC Morschwiller-le-Bas (9)
107.	AS St Etienne Salmbach (12)	3–4	SR Rountzenheim-Auenheim (10)
108.	AS Sarrewerden (13)	3–9 (a.e.t.)	AS Wingen-sur-Moder (11)
109.	FC Schaffhouse-sur-Zorn (12)	2–4	FC Saverne (8)
110.	AS Schœnau (11)	4–2 (a.e.t.)	AS Portugais Sélestat (9)
111.	FC Schwindratzheim (12)	0–2	US Bouxwiller (11)
112.	AS Seebach (11)	2–0	FC Herrlisheim (8)
113.	AS Sermersheim (9)	3–6 (a.e.t.)	FC Ostheim-Houssen (8)
114.	AS Sigolsheim (11)	3–5	AS Ober-Niederentzen (10)
115.	FC Soufflenheim (11)	0–3	Entente Kaltenhouse/Marienthal (9)
116.	SR St Amarin (9)	6–3 (a.e.t.)	ASCA Wittelsheim (8)
117.	AS St Hippolyte (16)	0–1 (Note: FC Oberhergeim penalised for unknown reasons. AS St Hippolyte qualify.)	FC Oberhergeim (12)
118.	FC Steinbrunn-le-Bas (10)	2–2 (3–2 p)	AS Guewenheim (10)
119.	ES Stotzheim (11)	2–1	AS Marckolsheim (12)
120.	FC Egalité Strasbourg (13)	1–6	SC Red Star Strasbourg (10)
121.	SC Gaz de Strasbourg (12)	5–4	AS Portugais Barembach-Bruche (12)
122.	AS Musau Strasbourg (11)	8–1	FC Stockfeld Colombes (11)
123.	US Sundhouse (11)	3–4	FC Hilsenheim (12)
124.	AS Turckheim (11)	3–1	FC Ingersheim (8)
125.	US Vallée de la Thur (8)	4–2	FC Baldersheim (9)
126.	FC Vendenheim (13)	0–2	FC Riedseltz/Rott (10)
127.	FC Village Neuf (11)	1–2	FC Uffheim (8)
128.	CS Waldhambach (10)	3–2	FC Phalsbourg (9)
129.	FC Weitbruch (10)	3–1	FC Durrenbach (10)
130.	FC Wettolsheim (12)	3–2	US Colmar (8)
131.	ES Wihr-au-Val (13)	1–5	RC Mulhouse (8)
132.	AS Willgottheim (11)	0–3	FC Dossenheim-sur-Zinsel (10)
133.	US Wimmenau (11)	3–2	AS Weinbourg (12)
134.	AS Wintzenheim (13)	0–9	FC Horbourg-Wihr (9)
135.	ASTR Wittenheim (11)	2–7	AS Rixheim (9)
136.	US Wittersheim (10)	4–0	FC Ecrivains-Schiltigheim-Bischheim (10)
137.	FC Wittisheim (12)	1–4	US Scherwiller (9)
138.	FC Wolfgantzen (13)	0–3	SR Kaysersberg (9)
139.	ES Wolfisheim (13)	0–5	FC Truchtersheim (9)
140.	SR Zellwiller (12)	4–3	FC Herbsheim (11)
141.	US Zimmersheim-Eschentzwiller (11)	2–3 (a.e.t.)	US Azzurri Mulhouse (9)
142.	Olympique Zinswiller (13)	2–3	ES Morsbronn-les-Bains (13)

=== Second round ===
These matches were played between 15 and 27 August 2019.

Second round results: Grand Est
Tie no	Home team (tier)	Score	Away team (tier)
1.	AS Algrange (8)	2–1	Val d'Orne FC (7)
2.	US Alsting-Zinzing (10)	0–2	ES Petite-Rosselle (8)
3.	ES Haute Meurthe (10)	0–3	AS Girancourt-Dommartin-Chaumousey (8)
4.	JS Ars-Laquenexy (9)	0–4	FC Devant-les-Ponts Metz (8)
5.	JS Audunoise(9)	1–4	ES Gorcy-Cosnes (10)
6.	ES Aviere Darnieulles (8)	2–3	FC Éloyes (9)
7.	AS Ay-sur-Moselle (11)	0–1	AS Anzeling Edling (11)
8.	ES Bayon-Roville (10)	0–2	AS Nomexy-Vincey (8)
9.	US Behonne-Longeville-en-Barois (10)	0–3	FC St Mihiel (8)
10.	ES Woippy (8)	3–5 (Note: Tie reversed with the agreement of both clubs.)	TS Bertrange (10)
11.	CO Bouzonville (10)	0–1	JS Distroff (11)
12.	AS Brouviller (10)	2–2(3–0 p)	AS Vibersviller (11)
13.	Entente Bure-Boulange (9)	2–1	CSP Réhon (9)
14.	CS Charmes (9)	3–2	ES Lunéville Sixte (9)
15.	FC Charmois-l'Orgueilleux (10)	3–2 (a.e.t.)	Bulgnéville Contrex Vittel FC (8)
16.	US Châtel-St Germain (8)	1–2	AS Montigny-lès-Metz (8)
17.	SC Commercy (10)	0–4	Entente Sorcy Void-Vacon (7)
18.	US Conflans (9)	1–3	ES Fameck (7)
19.	US Courcelles-Chaussy (9)	5–2	AS Peltre (11)
20.	AS St Julien-lès-Metz (8)	1–2 (a.e.t.)	ES Courcelles-sur-Nied (9)
21.	ES Custines-Malleloy (9)	2–4	AS Gondreville (8)
22.	Excelsior Cuvry (9)	2–3	ESAP Metz (8)
23.	FC Dannelbourg (10)	0–4	AS Réding (8)
24.	EF Delme-Solgne (9)	3–1	ASC Saulxures-lès-Nancy (9)
25.	FC Dieulouard (10)	0–2	FC Écrouves (9)
26.	FC Dieuze (9)	1–3 (a.e.t.)	AS Bettborn Hellering (8)
27.	US Etain-Buzy (7)	4–2 (a.e.t.)	US Briey (8)
28.	FC Fains-Véel (9)	2–9	Entente Vigneulles-Hannonville-Fresne (8)
29.	AS Falck (11)	0–2	AS Guerting (10)
30.	Stade Flévillois (9)	0–4	AF Laxou Sapinière (8)
31.	US Fontoy (11)	0–3	FC Hettange-Grande (8)
32.	FC Freyming (8)	1–2	CS Stiring-Wendel (9)
33.	ES Garche (10)	1–4	ES Kœnigsmacker-Kédange (8)
34.	US Goetzenbruck-Meisenthal (9)	5–3	US Behren-lès-Forbach (8)
35.	Entente Sud 54 (11)	2–1	ASC Montiers-sur-Saulx (10)
36.	AS Bliesbruck (8)	5–1	ES Gros Réderching-Bettviller (10)
37.	US Guentrange (9)	0–5	ES Gandrange (7)
38.	ACS Herserange (10)	0–3 (Note: Tie won by means of forfeit.)	USL Mont St Martin (9)
39.	US Holving (9)	1–6	SSEP Hombourg-Haut (8)
40.	SO Ippling (10)	0–4	SO Merlebach (8)
41.	US Jarny (9)	2–1	FC Dugny (9)
42.	AS Kerbach (10)	2–2 (2–4 p)	AS Hellimer (8)
43.	US Lamarche (11)	3–7 (a.e.t.)	AS Colombey (10)
44.	AS Laneuveville Marainviller (9)	1–3 (a.e.t.)	AC Blainville-Damelevières (8)
45.	ES Laneuveville (9)	0–4	AS Lay-St Christophe/Bouxieres-aux-Dames (8)
46.	AS Le Val-de-Guéblange (10)	0–4	SR Creutzwald 03 (8)
47.	USB Longwy (8)	1–3	CS Veymerange (7)
48.	Sportive Lorquinoise (9)	1–2	FC Ste Marguerite (8)
49.	ES Maizey-Lacroix (9)	1–1 (5–4 p)	SC Contrisson (10)
50.	ES Maizières (10)	0–4	UL Rombas (8)
51.	SC Malzéville (9)	1–2 (a.e.t.)	Toul JCA (8)
52.	ES Marange-Silvange (9)	3–1 (a.e.t.)	ES Metz (8)
53.	SC Marly (8)	2–1	AS Corny (10)
54.	US Marspich (10)	0–5	AS Clouange (8)
55.	AG Metzervisse (10)	2–3	AS Talange (10)
56.	FC Metzing (9)	0–4	AS Morhange (7)
57.	AJSE Montauville (10)	0–2	Ars-sur-Moselle FC (11)
58.	AS Mouterhouse (10)	2–3	FC Sarralbe (10)
59.	ASPTT Nancy (11)	1–6	AS Ludres (8)
60.	MJC Pichon (9)	0–4	FC Dombasle-sur-Meurthe (8)
61.	USF Farébersviller (8)	10–3	GS Nébing (10)
62.	AS Neunkirch (9)	0–1	JS Wenheck (8)
63.	FC Othe-Montmédy (9)	1–2	AS Saulnes Longlaville (8)
64.	US Oudrenne (9)	1–5	FC Hagondange (8)
65.	AS Plombières (10)	1–0	AS Padoux (9)
66.	FC Pont-à-Mousson (8)	3–4	FC St Max-Essey (7)
67.	AS Ramonchamp (11)	0–2	AS Vagney (7)
68.	AS Réchicourt-le-Château (11)	2–1	FC Hommert (10)
69.	AS Rehaincourt (10)	2–3	AS Gérardmer (8)
70.	ESR Rémeling (10)	0–3	FC Yutz (7)
71.	FC Revigny (9)	0–4 (a.e.t.)	US Thierville (8)
72.	FC Rohrbach-Bining (9)	1–7	US Soucht (8)
73.	ES Rosselange Vitry (11)	0–2	USAG Uckange (7)
74.	US Roth (9)	3–5	US Valmont (8)
75.	SR Saint-Dié (8)	10–0	SM Etival (10)
76.	AS St Nabord (9)	1–1 (4–3 p)	FC Remiremont St Étienne (8)
77.	FC Beausoleil Sarreguemines (10)	1–4	Achen-Etting-Schmittviller (7)
78.	Saulcy FC (9)	3–1	LSC Portieux (11)
79.	Entente Schorbach Hottviller Volmunster 13 (10)	0–5	ES Macheren Petit-Ebersviller (8)
80.	FC Rahling (10)	0–2	AS Seingbouse Betting Henriville (10)
81.	ES Lérouvillois Cheminote (10)	0–4	SF Verdun Belleville (8)
82.	US Spicheren (9)	– (Note: Match abandoned. Both teams removed from the competition.)	FC Longeville-lès-St Avold (8)
83.	SC Terville (10)	1–3	ES Richemont (9)
84.	GS Thiaucourt (10)	6–3 (a.e.t.)	SC Moulins-lès-Metz (10)
85.	AS Portugais St Francois Thionville (8)	1–0	FC Guénange (9)
86.	FC Toul (9)	5–0	Entente Centre Ornain (8)
87.	FC Ajolais (11)	1–2	FC Des Ballons (9)
88.	ENJ Val-de-Seille (9)	3–0	JA Rémilly (9)
89.	Lorraine Vaucouleurs (10)	1–4	GS Neuves-Maisons (7)
90.	GS Vézelise (11)	0–3	GS Haroué-Benney (7)
91.	SC Vic-sur-Seille (10)	4–6	SC Baccarat (8)
92.	AS Villey-St Étienne (8)	1–2	CS&O Blénod-Pont-à-Mousson (7)
93.	US Volkrange (10)	2–4	FC Hayange (8)
94.	Montagnarde Walscheid (9)	6–2	ES Badonviller-Celles (11)
95.	US Yutz (9)	2–3	ES Longuyon (8)
96.	Le Theux FC (8)	3–1	US Revin (9)
97.	US Balan (9)	0–7	CA Villers-Semeuse (7)
98.	Cheveuges-St Aignan CO (10)	0–4	AS Tournes/Renwez/Les Mazures/Arreux/Montcornet (7)
99.	JS Remilly-Aillicourt (10)	2–4 (a.e.t.)	USC Nouvion-sur-Meuse (9)
100.	Nord Ardennes (8)	2–1	AS Bourg-Rocroi (8)
101.	ES Vouziers (8)	1–1 (4–2 p)	FC Porcien (8)
102.	Olympique Charleville Neufmanil Aiglemont (7)	1–0	US Bazeilles (8)
103.	AS Tagnon (10)	0–4	USA Le Chesne (7)
104.	ES Charleville-Mézières (9)	5–2 (a.e.t.)	Liart-Signy-l'Abbaye FC (8)
105.	AS Sault-lès-Rethel (12)	0–4	FC Maubert-Fontaine (11)
106.	ES Saulces-Monclin (9)	1–2	Olympique Torcy-Sedan (7)
107.	FC Malgache (8)	2–0	Alliance Sud-Ouest Football Aubois (8)
108.	Étoile Chapelaine (9)	0–3	JS St Julien FC (7)
109.	SC Savières (10)	5–0	ES Municipaux Troyes (8)
110.	Amicale Bagneux-Clesles (10)	3–3 (4–3 p)	FC Traînel (9)
111.	JS Vaudoise (8)	3–0	AS Portugaise Nogent-sur-Seine (9)
112.	AS Chartreux (10)	7–1	UJ Méryciennes (9)
113.	FC Nord Est Aubois (8) (Note: FC Nord Est Aubois are a merger formed of Round 1 winners CS Trois Vallées, Round 1 forfeiters Stade Briennois and FC Chavanges. They take the place of CS Trois Vallées in the competition.)	1–4	Foyer Barsequanais (7)
114.	Arden 51 FC (12)	0–2	CS Agéen (8)
115.	US Oiry (8)	2–4	Châlons FCO (7)
116.	USS Sermaize (10)	1–1 (2–4 p)	FCF La Neuvillette-Jamin (8)
117.	ES Fagnières (8)	0–1 (Note: AS Taissy penalised. ES Fagnières qualify.)	AS Taissy (8)
118.	US Esternay (10)	1–5	FC Christo (7)
119.	RC Sézanne (7)	2–1	AS Cernay-Berru-Lavannes (7)
120.	US Thiéblemont-Farémont (10)	0–3	Bétheny FC (9)
121.	Foyer Compertrix (9)	1–1 (1–3 p)	ES Muizonnaise (11)
122.	Vitry FC (8)	1–2	ASPTT Châlons (7)
123.	FC Pargny-sur-Saulx (11)	0–7	US Fismes (8)
124.	FC Turcs Épernay (8)	0–1	US Avize-Grauves (6)
125.	FC St Martin-sur-le-Pré/La Veuve/Recy (10)	1–2	Nord Champagne FC (7)
126.	AS Champigny (10)	1–3	AS Courtisols ESTAN (8)
127.	ES Gault-Soigny (10)	2–4	FC Côte des Blancs (8)
128.	AS Sarrey-Montigny (7)	1–2 (a.e.t.)	Chaumont FC (7)
129.	FCCS Bragard (10)	0–2	US Montier-en-Der (8)
130.	CS Chalindrey (8)	4–0	SL Ornel (8)
131.	ES Prauthoy-Vaux (8)	3–0	CA Rolampontais (9)
132.	FC Prez Bourmont (9)	1–1 (0–3 p)	SC Marnaval (7)
133.	Espérance St Dizier (8)	0–3	FC Joinville-Vecqueville (9)
134.	Bar-sur-Aube FC (8)	1–0	Stade Chevillonnais (7)
135.	CS Maranville-Rennepont (9)	5–3 (a.e.t.)	AS Poissons-Noncourt (9)
136.	Foyer Bayard (10)	0–2	FC Bologne (9)
137.	CO Langres (10)	0–3	AF Valcourt (10)
138.	US Wassy-Brousseval (10)	1–3	FC Sts-Geosmois (7)
139.	FC Villiers-en-Lieu (10)	1–4	USI Blaise (6)
140.	AGIIR Florival (7)	0–3	AS Sundhoffen (7)
141.	AS Altorf (12)	1–3	FC Oberhausbergen (9)
142.	AS Aspach-le-Haut (10)	0–3	FCRS Richwiller (9)
143.	SS Beinheim (11)	2–7 (a.e.t.)	FC Scheibenhard (9)
144.	FC Bindernheim (10)	3–4	FC Ostheim-Houssen (8)
145.	FC Bisel (12)	3–0	Entente Hagenbach-Balschwiller (9)
146.	US Bouxwiller (11)	2–4	AS Mertzwiller (9)
147.	FC Brunstatt (8)	1–6	FC Hirtzfelden (8)
148.	FC Buhl (11)	3–2	US Pulversheim FC (9)
149.	AS Butten-Diemeringen (8)	1–1 (4–3 p)	FC Saverne (8)
150.	FC Colmar Unifié (11)	1–2	US Nordhouse (8)
151.	US Dachstein (10)	0–3	SR Hoenheim (9)
152.	FC Dahlenheim (8)	0–2	SC Drulingen (7)
153.	SC Dettwiller (11)	0–3	US Trois Maisons (9)
154.	FC Dossenheim-sur-Zinsel (10)	1–2 (a.e.t.)	US Wittersheim (10)
155.	USL Duppigheim (9)	5–0	CS Fegersheim (8)
156.	ALFC Duttlenheim (8)	4–1	FC Lampertheim (9)
157.	FC Eckbolsheim (8)	2–1	AS Neudorf (8)
158.	US Ettendorf (10)	1–1 (4–2 p)	ASL Duntzenheim (10)
159.	AS Forstfeld (12)	1–9	FC Soultz-sous-Forêts/Kutzenhausen (8)
160.	AS Gambsheim (9)	1–3	US Turcs Bischwiller (8)
161.	FC Geudertheim (9)	0–2	AS Hoerdt (8)
162.	FC Grendelbruch (12)	2–5	AS Elsau Portugais Strasbourg (7)
163.	FC Gries (12)	3–2	Entente Lembach/Wingen (12)
164.	FC Grussenheim (10)	3–1	FC Kogenheim (10)
165.	US Gumbrechtshoffen (11)	1–0	FC St Etienne Seltz (7)
166.	FC Gundolsheim (11)	4–0	FC Munchhouse (10)
167.	US Hangenbieten (11)	0–5	AS Mutzig (8)
168.	AS Hausgauen (12)	0–6	FC Bartenheim (7)
169.	FC Heiteren (10)	1–4	AS Berrwiller-Hartsmannswiller (7)
170.	FC Hilsenheim (12)	2–4	SR Kaysersberg (8)
171.	AC Hinterfeld (11)	2–1	AS Platania Gundershoffen (8)
172.	FC Hirtzbach (8)	2–2 (7–6 p)	FC Morschwiller-le-Bas (9)
173.	AS Hochstatt (12)	0–3	US Hirsingue (8)
174.	AS Hohengœft (12)	1–1 (2–4 p)	US Imbsheim (12)
175.	FC Horbourg-Wihr (9)	3–2 (a.e.t.)	UJ Epfig (9)
176.	AS Hunspach (8)	2–0	US Preuschdorf-Langensoultzbach (9)
177.	AS Rixheim Ile-Napoléon (13)	0–8	FC Steinbrunn-le-Bas (10)
178.	FC Illfurth (10)	0–6	FC Sierentz (7)
179.	FC Illhaeusern (8)	10–1	AS Pfaffenheim (9)
180.	AS Ingwiller/Menchhoffen (9)	1–7	AS Ohlungen (8)
181.	FR Jebsheim-Muntzenheim (11)	0–2	SC Sélestat (7)
182.	Entente Kaltenhouse/Marienthal (9)	2–1 (a.e.t.)	AS Mundolsheim (8)
183.	FC Kappelen (10)	0–5	FC Habsheim (8)
184.	FC Kembs Réunis (7)	1–1 (3–4 p)	US Vallée de la Thur (8)
185.	FC Kingersheim (9)	4–0	ASTR Wittenheim (11)
186.	La Wantzenau FC (11)	0–12	ES Molsheim-Ernolsheim (7)
187.	FC Lingolsheim (10)	0–3	AS Strasbourg (8)
188.	FC Lixhausen (13)	2–8	AJF Hautepierre Strasbourg (10)
189.	FC Marlenheim-Kirchheim (11)	1–1 (3–4 p)	US Wimmenau (11)
190.	FC Masevaux (12)	3–0	US Azzurri Mulhouse (10)
191.	US Mommenheim (11)	3–1	ES Pfettisheim (9)
192.	Montreux Sports (9)	1–0	AS Blotzheim (8)
193.	ES Morsbronn-les-Bains (13)	0–5	US Schleithal (9)
194.	Alliance Muespach-Folgensbourg (11)	3–2	SS Zillisheim (8)
195.	FC Anatolie Mulhouse (11)	6–1	FC Obermorschwiller (10)
196.	CS Mulhouse Bourtzwiller (8)	0–5	AS Altkirch (8)
197.	Étoile Mulhouse (11)	0–3	AS Rixheim (10)
198.	RC Mulhouse (9)	1–4	ASL Kœtzingue (7)
199.	Real ASPTT Mulhouse CF (8)	1–3 (a.e.t.)	Cernay FC (8) (Note: Cernay FC are a merger formed of Round 1 winners SC Cernay, SR Cernay and FC Franco Portugais Cernay. They take the place of SC Cernay in the competition.)
200.	AS Munster (8)	0–4	FC Burnhaupt-le-Haut (7)
201.	FC Niederhausbergen (11)	0–1	FC Eschau (8)
202.	FC Niederschaeffolsheim (11)	1–6	AS Kurtzenhouse (12)
203.	AS Niffer (10)	0–3	AS Huningue (7)
204.	FC Oberhoffen (10)	3–2 (a.e.t.)	AS Betschdorf (8)
205.	FCSR Obernai (8)	1–1 (3–4 p)	FCO Strasbourg Koenigshoffen 06 (8)
206.	AS Ober-Niederentzen (10)	9–0	FC Portugais Colmar (11)
207.	FC Oberroedern/Aschbach (10)	0–5	FC Drusenheim (7)
208.	AS Pfulgriesheim (11)	1–2	FC Schweighouse-sur-Moder (7)
209.	AS Raedersheim (8)	2–3	SC Ottmarsheim (8)
210.	FC Riedseltz/Rott (10)	0–2	AS Seebach (10)
211.	AS Châtenois (11)	8–2	FCI Riquewihr (11)
212.	SC Rittershoffen (11)	2–3	FC Weitbruch (10)
213.	FC Rossfeld (8)	0–3	FC Ste Croix-en-Plaine (8)
214.	SR Rountzenheim-Auenheim (10)	1–5	US Oberlauterbach (7)
215.	US Scherwiller (9)	0–3	AS Ribeauvillé (8)
216.	ASB Schirmeck-La Broque (9)	– (Note: Match abandoned with the scoreline 4–3, due to SC Red Star Strasbourg having insufficient players remaining to complete the game. SC Red Star Strasbourg penalised. ASB Schirmeck-La Broque qualify.)	SC Red Star Strasbourg (10)
217.	AS Schœnau (11)	0–2	AS Mussig (9)
218.	FC Souffelweyersheim (8)	3–1 (a.e.t.)	ASE Cité de l'Ill Strasbourg (9)
219.	SR St Amarin (9)	7–1	AS Blanc Vieux-Thann (8)
220.	AS St Hippolyte (13)	0–8	FC Rhinau (9)
221.	FC Steinseltz (8)	0–4	SS Weyersheim (7)
222.	ES Stotzheim (11)	0–6	Racing HW 96 (8)
223.	SC Gaz de Strasbourg (12)	1–1 (2–3 p)	ASL Robertsau (8)
224.	AS Menora Strasbourg (7)	4–1 (a.e.t.)	AS Bischoffsheim (8)
225.	AS Musau Strasbourg (10)	4–1	FC Boersch (11)
226.	FC Truchtersheim (9)	1–2	US Ittenheim (8)
227.	AS Turckheim (10)	1–6	FC Bennwihr (8)
228.	FC Uffheim (8)	1–2 (Note: FC Riedisheim penalised. FC Uffheim qualify.)	FC Riedisheim (8)
229.	AS Wahlenheim-Bernolsheim (12)	0–1	FC Lampertsloch-Merkswiller (13)
230.	CS Waldhambach (11)	0–2	FC Keskastel (9)
231.	FC Wettolsheim (12)	0–2	FC Rouffach (9)
232.	AS Wingen-sur-Moder (12)	1–2	US Oberschaeffolsheim (8)
233.	FC Wingersheim (9)	1–3	ASI Avenir (8)
234.	FC Wintzfelden-Osenbach (8)	7–1	US Baldenheim (8)
235.	SR Zellwiller (12)	1–3	FC Fessenheim (8)

=== Third round ===
These matches were played on 14 and 15 September 2019, with one yet to be arranged.

Third round results: Grand Est
Tie no	Home team (tier)	Score	Away team (tier)
1.	AS Algrange (8)	3–2	Thionville FC (6)
2.	RS Amanvillers (7)	1–0	US Etain-Buzy (7)
3.	AS Anzeling Edling (11)	0–3	ES Macheren Petit-Ebersviller (8)
4.	Ars-sur-Moselle FC (11)	2–0	FC Écrouves (9)
5.	SC Baccarat (8)	0–4	ES Thaon (5)
6.	AC Blainville-Damelevières (8)	3–0	AS Vagney (7)
7.	AS Bliesbruck (8)	2–2 (4–2 p)	US Goetzenbruck-Meisenthal (9)
8.	AS Brouviller (10)	1–5	ES Petite-Rosselle (8)
9.	CS Charmes (9)	0–4	ES Heillecourt (7)
10.	FC Charmois-l'Orgueilleux (10)	0–5	ES Golbey (6)
11.	Entente Bure-Boulange (9)	1–3 (a.e.t.) (Note: Tie reversed from original draw.)	AS Clouange (8)
12.	AS Colombey (10)	2–3	AS Girancourt-Dommartin-Chaumousey (8)
13.	ES Courcelles-sur-Nied (9)	5–4	US Courcelles-Chaussy (9)
14.	SR Creutzwald 03 (8)	3–2 (a.e.t.)	ES Fameck (7)
15.	EF Delme-Solgne (9)	0–2	CS&O Blénod-Pont-à-Mousson (7)
16.	JS Distroff (11)	0–2	AS Talange (10)
17.	FC Éloyes (9)	0–3	Jarville JF (6)
18.	Entente Sud 54 (11)	0–3	AS Ludres (8)
19.	ES Gandrange (7)	1–1 (3–5 p)	JS Wenheck (8)
20.	ES Gorcy-Cosnes (10)	1–2	ES Villerupt-Thil (6)
21.	AS Guerting (10)	0–10	US Forbach (6)
22.	FC Hagondange (8)	2–3	UL Plantières Metz (7)
23.	Entente Vigneulles-Hannonville-Fresne (8)	1–2	US Pagny-sur-Moselle (6)
24.	GS Haroué-Benney (7)	3–1	AS Gérardmer (8)
25.	FC Hayange (8)	0–1	UL Rombas (8)
26.	AS Hellimer (8)	3–1	CS Stiring-Wendel (9)
27.	FC Hettange-Grande (8)	2–0	US Jarny (9)
28.	SSEP Hombourg-Haut (8)	1–0	FC Trémery (7)
29.	ES Kœnigsmacker-Kédange (8)	2–3	Achen-Etting-Schmittviller (7)
30.	AF Laxou Sapinière (8)	– (Note: Match abandoned after 70 minutes with the scoreline 1–1, due to AF Laxou Sapinière no longer having sufficient players to complete the game. AF Laxou Sapinière penalised. Toul JCA qualify.)	Toul JCA (8)
31.	AS Lay-St Christophe/Bouxieres-aux-Dames (8)	0–2	FC Dombasle-sur-Meurthe (8)
32.	ES Longuyon (8)	1–5	CSO Amnéville (5)
33.	ES Maizey-Lacroix (9)	0–1	COS Villers (7)
34.	SO Merlebach (8)	2–4	ES Marange-Silvange (9)
35.	FC Devant-les-Ponts Metz (8)	2–1	RS Magny (7)
36.	ESAP Metz (8)	0–2	AS Montigny-lès-Metz (8)
37.	USL Mont St Martin (9)	0–3	TS Bertrange (10)
38.	AS Morhange (7)	3–1	AS Gondreville (8)
39.	AS Nomexy-Vincey (8)	1–2	AS Bettborn Hellering (8)
40.	FC Bassin Piennois (7)	1–2	AS Portugais St Francois Thionville (8)
41.	AS Plombières (10)	1–3	FC Pulnoy (7)
42.	AS Réchicourt-le-Château (11)	0–6	US Raon-l'Étape (5)
43.	ES Richemont (9)	0–8	RC Champigneulles (6)
44.	FC Des Ballons (9)	0–0 (2–4 p)	Saulcy FC (9)
45.	FC St Max-Essey (7)	2–2 (4–5 p)	AS Réding (8)
46.	AS St Nabord (9)	2–4	GS Neuves-Maisons (7)
47.	FC Ste Marguerite (8)	1–2	SR Saint-Dié (8)
48.	FC Sarralbe (10)	1–8	US Nousseviller (7)
49.	AS Saulnes Longlaville (8)	2–4	CS Veymerange (7)
50.	AS Seingbouse Betting Henriville (10)	1–6	USF Farébersviller (8)
51.	US Soucht (8)	2–4	Sarreguemines FC (5)
52.	winner tie 82	– (Note: Void due to both teams from tie 82 being removed from the competition.)	CA Boulay (6)
53.	GS Thiaucourt (10)	0–2	Entente Sorcy Void-Vacon (7)
54.	US Thierville (8)	1–2	Bar-le-Duc FC (6)
55.	FC Toul (9)	0–3	SC Marly (8)
56.	ENJ Val-de-Seille (9)	0–4	FC Sarrebourg (6)
57.	US Valmont (8)	0–1	APM Metz (6)
58.	US Vandœuvre (6)	2–2 (4–2 p)	USAG Uckange (7)
59.	SF Verdun Belleville (8)	4–0	FC St Mihiel (8)
60.	Montagnarde Walscheid (9)	1–3	FC Lunéville (6)
61.	FC Yutz (7)	3–5 (a.e.t.)	Étoile Naborienne St Avold (6)
62.	FCF La Neuvillette-Jamin (8)	3–0	USC Nouvion-sur-Meuse (9)
63.	Olympique Charleville Neufmanil Aiglemont (7)	1–1 (3–1 p)	Rethel SF (6)
64.	AS Prix-lès-Mézières (5)	4–1	AS Asfeld (6)
65.	AS Tournes/Renwez/Les Mazures/Arreux/Montcornet (7)	0–1	CA Villers-Semeuse (7)
66.	USA Le Chesne (7)	1–0 (a.e.t.)	FC Bogny (6)
67.	ES Vouziers (8)	1–2	Nord Ardennes (8)
68.	ES Fagnières (8)	0–4	MJEP Cormontreuil (6)
69.	FC Maubert-Fontaine (11)	0–5	ES Charleville-Mézières (9)
70.	Olympique Torcy-Sedan (7)	1–2	Nord Champagne FC (7)
71.	AS Courtisols ESTAN (8)	2–6	Le Theux FC (8)
72.	FC Côte des Blancs (8)	5–0	CS Agéen (8)
73.	US Fismes (8)	0–2	USI Blaise (6)
74.	Châlons FCO (7)	3–1 (a.e.t.)	RC Sézanne (7)
75.	US Avize-Grauves (6)	2–3 (a.e.t.)	RC Épernay Champagne (6)
76.	ES Muizonnaise (11)	2–3	Bétheny FC (9)
77.	US Éclaron (6)	2–0	SA Sézanne (6)
78.	FC Joinville-Vecqueville (9)	3–2	Amicale Bagneux-Clesles (10)
79.	US Montier-en-Der (8)	1–2	FC Christo (7)
80.	ASPTT Châlons (7)	1–3	EF Reims Sainte-Anne Châtillons (6)
81.	JS St Julien FC (7)	2–0	SC Savières (10)
82.	Bar-sur-Aube FC (8)	0–2	FC Métropole Troyenne (5)
83.	FC Bologne (9)	0–2	FC Nogentais (6)
84.	JS Vaudoise (8)	0–2	RCS La Chapelle (6)
85.	Chaumont FC (7)	2–0	CS Chalindrey (8)
86.	CS Maranville-Rennepont (9)	3–2	AS Chartreux (10)
87.	FC Sts-Geosmois (7)	3–2 (a.e.t.)	FC Malgache (8)
88.	ES Prauthoy-Vaux (8)	2–3	FC St Mesmin (6)
89.	AF Valcourt (10)	0–2	SC Marnaval (7)
90.	Racing HW 96 (8)	1–7	ASC Biesheim (5)
91.	USL Duppigheim (9)	2–1	US Nordhouse (8)
92.	AS Ober-Niederentzen (10)	0–3	SC Sélestat (7)
93.	FC Rhinau (9)	1–5	Stadium Racing Colmar (6)
94.	AS Mutzig (8)	3–1	SR St Amarin (9)
95.	AS Châtenois (11)	3–8	FC Ostheim-Houssen (8)
96.	AS Ribeauvillé (8)	2–0	FC Horbourg-Wihr (9)
97.	ASB Schirmeck-La Broque (9)	2–5	AS Berrwiller-Hartsmannswiller (7)
98.	FC Buhl (11)	2–5	AS Sundhoffen (7)
99.	AS Mussig (9)	1–4	AS Erstein (6)
100.	FC Grussenheim (10)	0–4	FC Still 1930 (7)
101.	SR Kaysersberg (8)	1–0	ALFC Duttlenheim (8)
102.	FC Masevaux (12)	1–1 (2–4 p)	FC Illhaeusern (8)
103.	FC Bennwihr (8)	2–1	FC Rouffach (9)
104.	FC Ste Croix-en-Plaine (8)	1–0	FC Wintzfelden-Osenbach (8)
105.	FC Fessenheim (8)	6–2	Montreux Sports (9)
106.	FC Uffheim (8)	0–5	FC Saint-Louis Neuweg (5)
107.	FCRS Richwiller (9)	4–3	FC Burnhaupt-le-Haut (7)
108.	Alliance Muespach-Folgensbourg (11)	4–2 (a.e.t.)	FC Hirtzbach (8)
109.	AS Huningue (7)	2–0	FC Bartenheim (7)
110.	SC Ottmarsheim (8)	3–0	FC Kingersheim (9)
111.	AS Rixheim (10)	1–4	AS Altkirch (8)
112.	FC Bisel (12)	2–2 (3–4 p)	Cernay FC (8)
113.	FC Hégenheim (6)	3–2	FC Sierentz (7)
114.	FC Habsheim (8)	0–3	FC Hirtzfelden (8)
115.	FC Steinbrunn-le-Bas (10)	5–2 (a.e.t.)	US Vallée de la Thur (8)
116.	FC Gundolsheim (11)	0–8	FC Hagenthal-Wentzwiller (6)
117.	US Hirsingue (8)	1–3	AS Illzach Modenheim (6)
118.	FC Anatolie Mulhouse (11)	2–3 (a.e.t.)	ASL Kœtzingue (7)
119.	US Wimmenau (11)	1–5	AS Mertzwiller (9)
120.	FCO Strasbourg Koenigshoffen 06 (8)	3–1	FC Souffelweyersheim (8)
121.	US Mommenheim (11)	0–6	US Sarre-Union (5)
122.	AS Ohlungen (8)	1–3 (a.e.t.)	US Ittenheim (8)
123.	US Imbsheim (12)	2–3	US Reipertswiller (6)
124.	US Ettendorf (10)	0–2	AS Butten-Diemeringen (8)
125.	US Trois Maisons (9)	2–1	FC Keskastel (9)
126.	ASI Avenir (8)	2–6	US Turcs Bischwiller (8)
127.	FC Obermodern (6)	2–3	ES Molsheim-Ernolsheim (7)
128.	SC Drulingen (7)	4–0	FC Eckbolsheim (8)
129.	FC Soleil Bischheim (6)	5–0	FC Drusenheim (7)
130.	FC Oberhoffen (10)	3–2	AS Hunspach (8)
131.	AC Hinterfeld (11)	2–2 (5–3 p)	FC Gries (12)
132.	Entente Kaltenhouse/Marienthal (9)	0–2	ASPV Strasbourg (5)
133.	AS Kurtzenhouse (12)	3–2 (a.e.t.)	FC Schweighouse-sur-Moder (7)
134.	US Gumbrechtshoffen (11)	0–2	AS Hoerdt (8)
135.	FCE Schirrhein (6)	0–4	SS Weyersheim (7)
136.	FC Lampertsloch-Merkswiller (13)	1–2	FC Soultz-sous-Forêts/Kutzenhausen (8)
137.	FC Scheibenhard (9)	2–4	US Oberlauterbach (7)
138.	FC Weitbruch (10)	2–0	US Schleithal (9)
139.	US Wittersheim (10)	0–1 (a.e.t.)	AS Seebach (10)
140.	FC Oberhausbergen (9)	0–3	FA Illkirch Graffenstaden (5)
141.	ASL Robertsau (8)	3–1	AS Menora Strasbourg (7)
142.	AJF Hautepierre Strasbourg (10)	2–3	FC Kronenbourg Strasbourg (6)
143.	FC Geispolsheim 01 (6)	3–3 (4–3 p)	Olympique Strasbourg (7)
144.	SR Hoenheim (9)	1–2	AS Elsau Portugais Strasbourg (7)
145.	AS Musau Strasbourg (10)	2–1	AS Strasbourg (8)
146.	US Oberschaeffolsheim (8)	4–1	FC Eschau (8)

=== Fourth round ===
These matches were played on 29 September 2019.

Fourth round results: Grand Est
Tie no	Home team (tier)	Score	Away team (tier)
1.	SC Marly (8)	1–2 (a.e.t.)	Sarreguemines FC (5)
2.	RS Amanvillers (7)	0–2	FC Hettange-Grande (8)
3.	Bar-le-Duc FC (6)	1–1 (3–1 p)	CS&O Blénod-Pont-à-Mousson (7)
4.	AS Talange (10)	3–2 (a.e.t.)	SF Verdun Belleville (8)
5.	Entente Sorcy Void-Vacon (7)	0–3	CSO Amnéville (5)
6.	FC Devant-les-Ponts Metz (8)	0–2 (Note: Tie reversed from original draw.)	AS Clouange (8)
7.	AS Algrange (8)	1–3	Jarville JF (6)
8.	AS Portugais St Francois Thionville (8)	1–2 (a.e.t.)	RC Champigneulles (6)
9.	UL Rombas (8)	0–2	US Pagny-sur-Moselle (6)
10.	TS Bertrange (10)	1–2	CS Veymerange (7)
11.	AS Montigny-lès-Metz (8)	3–1	ES Marange-Silvange (9)
12.	Ars-sur-Moselle FC (11)	1–1 (3–2 p)	APM Metz (6)
13.	UL Plantières Metz (7)	0–0 (2–4 p)	JS Wenheck (8)
14.	ES Courcelles-sur-Nied (9)	1–4	US Forbach (6)
15.	AS Hellimer (8)	1–8	SAS Épinal (4)
16.	ES Macheren Petit-Ebersviller (8)	1–2	ES Petite-Rosselle (8)
17.	Achen-Etting-Schmittviller (7)	0–4	Étoile Naborienne St Avold (6)
18.	US Nousseviller (7)	2–2 (4–2 p)	AS Morhange (7)
19.	AS Bliesbruck (8)	1–6	ES Villerupt-Thil (6)
20.	USF Farébersviller (8)	1–3 (a.e.t.)	SSEP Hombourg-Haut (8)
21.	SR Creutzwald 03 (8)	1–2	CA Boulay (6)
22.	Toul JCA (8)	2–0	COS Villers (7)
23.	FC Dombasle-sur-Meurthe (8)	3–0 (a.e.t.)	FC Pulnoy (7)
24.	AS Bettborn Hellering (8)	0–0 (4–2 p)	AS Girancourt-Dommartin-Chaumousey (8)
25.	AS Ludres (8)	1–3	ES Golbey (6)
26.	Saulcy FC (9)	0–3	ES Thaon (5)
27.	AS Réding (8)	0–3	FC Sarrebourg (6)
28.	GS Neuves-Maisons (7)	2–7	FC Lunéville (6)
29.	ES Heillecourt (7)	0–1	US Vandœuvre (6)
30.	SR Saint-Dié (8)	1–3	US Raon-l'Étape (5)
31.	GS Haroué-Benney (7)	1–0	AC Blainville-Damelevières (8)
32.	Nord Ardennes (8)	3–5	FC Côte des Blancs (8)
33.	Le Theux FC (8)	2–0	Bétheny FC (9)
34.	CA Villers-Semeuse (7)	0–1	CS Sedan Ardennes (4)
35.	USA Le Chesne (7)	3–0	FCF La Neuvillette-Jamin (8)
36.	Nord Champagne FC (7)	1–4	FC Christo (7)
37.	ES Charleville-Mézières (9)	0–3	EF Reims Sainte-Anne Châtillons (6)
38.	MJEP Cormontreuil (6)	4–1	Châlons FCO (7)
39.	Olympique Charleville Neufmanil Aiglemont (7)	0–2	AS Prix-lès-Mézières (5)
40.	FC Joinville-Vecqueville (9)	2–3	US Éclaron (6)
41.	JS St Julien FC (7)	3–3 (3–1 p)	FC Métropole Troyenne (5)
42.	FC St Mesmin (6)	3–1	SC Marnaval (7)
43.	Foyer Barsequanais (7)	1–4	Chaumont FC (7)
44.	CS Maranville-Rennepont (9)	0–3	FC Sts-Geosmois (7)
45.	USI Blaise (6)	1–2	FC Nogentais (6)
46.	RCS La Chapelle (6)	2–3 (a.e.t.)	RC Épernay Champagne (6)
47.	AS Sundhoffen (7)	3–0	SR Kaysersberg (8)
48.	AS Erstein (6)	5–2	AS Elsau Portugais Strasbourg (7)
49.	USL Duppigheim (9)	2–4	FC Still 1930 (7)
50.	US Oberschaeffolsheim (8)	2–1	AS Ribeauvillé (8)
51.	Stadium Racing Colmar (6)	0–2 (a.e.t.)	SC Schiltigheim (4)
52.	AS Musau Strasbourg (10)	1–4	SC Sélestat (7)
53.	FA Illkirch Graffenstaden (5)	1–1 (3–4 p)	FC Geispolsheim 01 (6)
54.	FC Bennwihr (8)	1–1 (5–4 p)	FC Ste Croix-en-Plaine (8)
55.	FCO Strasbourg Koenigshoffen 06 (8)	1–0	AS Mutzig (8)
56.	FC Illhaeusern (8)	2–5	ASPV Strasbourg (5)
57.	AS Hoerdt (8)	4–5 (a.e.t.)	AS Mertzwiller (9)
58.	US Trois Maisons (9)	0–1	FC Kronenbourg Strasbourg (6)
59.	AS Kurtzenhouse (12)	3–0	FC Soultz-sous-Forêts/Kutzenhausen (8)
60.	FC Weitbruch (10)	1–3	US Oberlauterbach (7)
61.	US Turcs Bischwiller (8)	0–1	US Sarre-Union (5)
62.	AC Hinterfeld (11)	1–6	FCSR Haguenau (4)
63.	AS Butten-Diemeringen (8)	1–3	ES Molsheim-Ernolsheim (7)
64.	FC Oberhoffen (10)	0–5	US Reipertswiller (6)
65.	AS Seebach (10)	1–2 (a.e.t.)	FC Soleil Bischheim (6)
66.	SS Weyersheim (7)	7–2	SC Drulingen (7)
67.	US Ittenheim (8)	2–0	ASL Robertsau (8)
68.	FC Hirtzfelden (8)	0–2	Cernay FC (8)
69.	FCRS Richwiller (9)	0–4	FC Hagenthal-Wentzwiller (6)
70.	FC Steinbrunn-le-Bas (10)	3–2	AS Berrwiller-Hartsmannswiller (7)
71.	ASL Kœtzingue (7)	0–8	ASC Biesheim (5)
72.	AS Huningue (7)	0–2	FC Mulhouse (4)
73.	AS Altkirch (8)	3–4	FC Fessenheim (8)
74.	FC Saint-Louis Neuweg (5)	1–0 (a.e.t.)	FC Hégenheim (6)
75.	Alliance Muespach-Folgensbourg (11)	3–2	SC Ottmarsheim (8)
76.	FC Ostheim-Houssen (8)	0–2	AS Illzach Modenheim (6)

=== Fifth round ===
These matches were played on 12 and 13 October 2019.

Fifth round results: Grand Est
Tie no	Home team (tier)	Score	Away team (tier)
1.	AS Sundhoffen (7)	3–2	FC Bennwihr (8)
2.	Alliance Muespach-Folgensbourg (11)	1–6	ES Molsheim-Ernolsheim (7)
3.	Cernay FC (8)	1–5	AS Erstein (6)
4.	FC Steinbrunn-le-Bas (10)	4–5 (a.e.t.)	AS Illzach Modenheim (6)
5.	FC Geispolsheim 01 (6)	2–0	FC Still 1930 (7)
6.	SC Sélestat (7)	0–2	FC Mulhouse (4)
7.	FC Fessenheim (8)	0–4	US Raon-l'Étape (5)
8.	FC Hagenthal-Wentzwiller (6)	0–5	FC Saint-Louis Neuweg (5)
9.	AS Kurtzenhouse (12)	1–2	US Oberschaeffolsheim (8)
10.	FC Sarrebourg (6)	0–3	SC Schiltigheim (4)
11.	FC Kronenbourg Strasbourg (6)	2–0	US Reipertswiller (6)
12.	ASPV Strasbourg (5)	3–1	FC Soleil Bischheim (6)
13.	FCO Strasbourg Koenigshoffen 06 (8)	0–2	SS Weyersheim (7)
14.	US Ittenheim (8)	0–4	ASC Biesheim (5)
15.	AS Mertzwiller (9)	1–2	US Oberlauterbach (7)
16.	JS Wenheck (8)	– (Note: Match abandoned after 70 minutes, due to continued throwing of flares from the crown. The scoreline at the time was 0–2. JS Wenheck penalised. US Nousseviller qualify.)	US Nousseviller (7)
17.	AS Bettborn Hellering (8)	0–3	US Sarre-Union (5)
18.	AS Talange (10)	0–3	SSEP Hombourg-Haut (8)
19.	US Forbach (6)	2–0	CS Veymerange (7)
20.	FC Hettange-Grande (8)	0–0 (4–2 p)	AS Clouange (8)
21.	Sarreguemines FC (5)	0–2	CA Boulay (6)
22.	ES Petite-Rosselle (8)	1–4	Étoile Naborienne St Avold (6)
23.	ES Villerupt-Thil (6)	0–1 (a.e.t.)	FCSR Haguenau (4)
24.	Ars-sur-Moselle FC (11)	0–2	CSO Amnéville (5)
25.	ES Thaon (5)	3–0	Jarville JF (6)
26.	US Vandœuvre (6)	3–1 (a.e.t.)	RC Champigneulles (6)
27.	Toul JCA (8)	3–3 (4–5 p)	FC Lunéville (6)
28.	GS Haroué-Benney (7)	4–3 (a.e.t.)	FC Dombasle-sur-Meurthe (8)
29.	US Pagny-sur-Moselle (6)	0–3	SAS Épinal (4)
30.	AS Montigny-lès-Metz (8)	2–1 (a.e.t.)	ES Golbey (6)
31.	US Éclaron (6)	0–3 (a.e.t.)	MJEP Cormontreuil (6)
32.	RC Épernay Champagne (6)	6–0	JS St Julien FC (7)
33.	CS Sedan Ardennes (4)	0–1	AS Prix-lès-Mézières (5)
34.	Le Theux FC (8)	6–2	FC Nogentais (6)
35.	FC Côte des Blancs (8)	2–1	FC Sts-Geosmois (7)
36.	Chaumont FC (7)	2–1 (a.e.t.)	FC St Mesmin (6)
37.	EF Reims Sainte-Anne Châtillons (6)	3–0	FC Christo (7)
38.	USA Le Chesne (7)	1–0	Bar-le-Duc FC (6)

=== Sixth round ===
These matches were played on 26 and 27 October 2019.

Sixth round results: Grand Est
Tie no	Home team (tier)	Score	Away team (tier)
1.	AS Erstein (6)	4–2 (a.e.t.)	US Nousseviller (7)
2.	CA Boulay (6)	4–4 (4–2 p)	Étoile Naborienne St Avold (6)
3.	RC Épernay Champagne (6)	1–2	SAS Épinal (4)
4.	AS Montigny-lès-Metz (8)	0–2	EF Reims Sainte-Anne Châtillons (6)
5.	FC Côte des Blancs (8)	1–3	US Vandœuvre (6)
6.	Le Theux FC (8)	0–2	CSO Amnéville (5)
7.	FC Hettange-Grande (8)	0–2	MJEP Cormontreuil (6)
8.	FC Lunéville (6)	3–1	GS Haroué-Benney (7)
9.	Chaumont FC (7)	0–3	US Raon-l'Étape (5)
10.	SC Schiltigheim (4)	0–2	ES Thaon (5)
11.	SSEP Hombourg-Haut (8)	1–0 (a.e.t.)	FC Saint-Louis Neuweg (5)
12.	SS Weyersheim (7)	3–3 (2–4 p)	ASPV Strasbourg (5)
13.	ES Molsheim-Ernolsheim (7)	2–2 (1–3 p)	AS Sundhoffen (7)
14.	US Forbach (6)	4–2	FC Kronenbourg Strasbourg (6)
15.	US Oberschaeffolsheim (8)	3–2	US Oberlauterbach (7)
16.	AS Illzach Modenheim (6)	0–1	FC Mulhouse (4)
17.	US Sarre-Union (5)	3–0	ASC Biesheim (5)
18.	FC Geispolsheim 01 (6)	3–2 (a.e.t.)	FCSR Haguenau (4)
19.	USA Le Chesne (7)	0–2	AS Prix-lès-Mézières (5)
