= Hervé Milazzo =

French footballer (born 1975)

Personal information
- Date of birth: April 26, 1975 (age 51)
- Place of birth: Mulhouse, France
- Height: 1.86 m (6 ft 1 in)
- Position: Defender

Team information
- Current team: Illzach (Manager)

Senior career*
Years	Team	Apps	(Gls)
1989–1995	Mulhouse B		
1994–1999	Mulhouse	155	(11)
1999–2003	Grenoble		
2003–2004	AS Angoulême		
2004–2010	Mulhouse		
2010–2012	Illzach		
2012–2015	Hirtzbach		

Managerial career
- 2012–2015: Hirtzbach (player-manager)
- 2015–2020: Biesheim
- 2021–2022: Hégenheim
- 2022–: Illzach
- * Club domestic league appearances and goals

Hervé Milazzo (born April 26, 1975) is a retired French professional football player and manager, currently in charge of Illzach.

He played on the professional level in Ligue 2 for FC Mulhouse and Grenoble Foot 38.

== Coaching career ==
After two seasons in Illzach, Milazzo hung up his boots at the end of the 2011-12 season. Already in May 2012, before the end of the season, he was presented as the new manager of French club FC Hirtzbach from the upcoming 2012-13 season. Here he took on the role of player-manager.

In May 2015, Milazzo was presented as the new manager of ASC Biesheim. After five seasons at the club, he left Biesheim at the end of the 2019-20 season as his contract was due to expire and was not renewed.

In April 2021 Milazzo became the coach of FC Hégenheim. Less than a year later, in March 2022, Milazzo was sacked after the team finished 7th in the Régional 1 league and had just missed out on qualifying for the Coupe de France.

Two months after being sacked at Hégenheim, Milazzo was presented as manager of his former club, Illzach, from the upcoming 2022-23 season. Ahead of the 2024-25 season, Milazzo extended his contract at the club by one year.
