= AS Illzach Modenheim =

French football club

Illzach
- Full name: Association Sportive Illzach Modenheim Foot
- Founded: 1932
- Ground: Stade Joseph Biechlin
- Chairman: Roger Schirck
- Manager: Hervé Milazzo
- League: Régional 1 – Grand Est Group C
- 2023–24: Régional 1 – Grand Est Group C, 1st

Association Sportive Illzach Modenheim Foot, commonly known as ASIM or just Illzach, is a French association football team founded in 1932. They are based in Illzach, Alsace, France and are currently playing in the Regional 1 Alsace, effectively the sixth tier in the French football league system. They play at the Stade Joseph Biechlin in Illzach.

ASIM reached the 7th round of the 2010–11 and 2012–13 Coupe de France, losing on penalties to US Forbach and 3–2 to SAS Épinal.
