= 2016–17 Coupe de France preliminary rounds, Picardie and Nord-Pas de Calais =

The 2016–17 Coupe de France preliminary rounds, Picardie and Nord-Pas de Calais made up the qualifying competition to decide which teams from the Picardie and Nord-Pas de Calais leagues took part in the main competition from round 7. This was the 100th season of the French football cup competition. The competition was organised by the French Football Federation (FFF) and is open to all clubs in French football, as well as clubs from the overseas departments and territories (Guadeloupe, French Guiana, Martinique, Mayotte, New Caledonia (qualification via 2016 New Caledonia Cup), Tahiti (qualification via 2016 Tahiti Cup), Réunion, and Saint Martin).

The qualifying rounds took place between June and October 2016.

== Second round ==
=== Second round (Picardie) ===
These matches were played on 26, 27 and 28 August 2016.

Second round results: Picardie

Tie no	Home team (tier)	Score	Away team (tier)
1.	US Le Crotoy (10)	0–3	FC Centuloise (8)
2.	AFC Holnon-Fayet (10)	3–2	US Guise (8)
3.	FC Amigny-Rouy (9)	2–3	SAS Moy de l'Aisne (8)
4.	L'Arsenal Club Achery-Beautor-Charmes (8)	1–0	CS Villeneuve St Germain (9)
5.	AS Beaurevoir (11)	2–7	Harly Quentin (8)
6.	ESUS Buironfosse-La Capelle (10)	2–2 (3–2 p)	SC Origny-en-Thiérache (11)
7.	FFC Chéry-lès-Pouilly (10)	1–1 (2–1 p)	Entente Crouy-Cuffies (11)
8.	US Crépy Vivaise (10)	2–0	FC Billy-sur-Aisne (11)
9.	Fraternelle des Chemniots de Laon (11)	0–3 (Note: Tie won by means of forfeit.)	US Guignicourt (7)
10.	Le Nouvion AC (9)	5–1	US Vervins (10)
11.	FC Mézières (12)	7–1	UES Vermand (10)
12.	AS Milonaise (11)	0–3	Château Thierry-Étampes FC (7)
13.	FC Monceau Les Leups (10)	2–0	BCV FC (9)
14.	ES Montcornet (8)	2–3	US Ribemont Mezieres FC (9)
15.	CS Montescourt-Lizerolles (13)	1–3	US Chauny (7)
16.	AS Neuilly-St Front (12)	2–4	Internationale Soissonnaise (7)
17.	TFC Neuve-Maison (10)	0–2	ICS Créçois (7)
18.	US Seboncourt (11)	1–3	RC Bohain (8)
19.	Septmonts OC (10)	1–6	US Bruyères-et-Montbérault (8)
20.	FC Vierzy (10)	0–3	UA Fère-en-Tardenois (9)
21.	FC Villers Cotterêts (9)	1–0	US Prémontré St Gobain (8)
22.	USE St Leu d'Esserent (8)	0–0 (4–3 p)	Hermes-Berthecourt AC (8)
23.	AS Coye-la-Forêt (11)	1–7	US Bresloise (10)
24.	AS Silly-le-Long (11)	0–3	CS Liancourt-Ratigny (7)
25.	AS Allonne (9)	1–4	US Étouy (7)
26.	AS Brunvillers-la-Motte (13)	0–3	US Fouquenies (10)
27.	AS Tracy-le-Mont (10)	1–5	RC Clermont (8)
28.	US Attichy (13)	3–0	CS Verberie (12)
29.	US Paillart (10)	0–3	US Margny-lès-Compiègne (9)
30.	FC Clairoix (10)	1–3	US Pont Ste-Maxence (7)
31.	CS Avilly-St Léonard (10)	2–1	US Nogent (7)
32.	AS Beaulieu Ecuvilly (13)	1–2	AmS St Sauveur (9)
33.	AS Bornel (11)	0–1	US Crépy-en-Valois (8)
34.	SC Songeons (9)	1–3	US Chevrières-Grandfresnoy (7)
35.	AS Montchrevreuil (9)	1–2	US St Maximin (7)
36.	US St Germer-de-Fly (10)	2–0	US Mouy (11)
37.	US Ribécourt (9)	3–0	US Meru Sandricourt (8)
38.	RC Précy (11)	2–3	USR St Crépin-Ibouvillers (9)
39.	FC Nointel (9)	1–4	US Lassigny (10)
40.	EC Villers/Bailleul (10)	1–1 (5–6 p)	Grandvilliers AC (9)
41.	FC Eches-Fosseuse (11)	4–1	AS La Neuville-sur-Oudeuil (11)
42.	FC Amblainville-Sandricourt (11)	1–10	US Cires-lès-Mello (8)
43.	ESF Formerie (10)	1–4	US Breteuil (7)
44.	US Nanteuil FC (10)	5–5 (3–1 p)	AS Thourotte (10)
45.	ESC Wavignies (10)	0–1	US Lamorlaye (9)
46.	FC Vineuil-St Firmin (13)	0–3	FC Longueil-Annel (8)
47.	FC Fontainettes St Aubin (13)	4–1	ES Remy (12)
48.	AS Orry-La-Chapelle (10)	3–5	CS Chaumont-en-Vexin (8)
49.	FC Carlepont (10)	0–7	SC St Just-en-Chaussée (7)
50.	AS Ons-en-Bray (11)	0–4	FC Béthisy (9)
51.	AF Trie-Château (12)	0–1	Stade Ressontois (9)
52.	FC Salency (13)	1–2	FC Cauffry (9)
53.	AS Plailly (10)	0–1	AFC Creil (7)
54.	US Estrées-St Denis (9)	3–1	Standard FC Montataire (7)
55.	ASC Val d'Automne (11)	2–6	CS Haudivillers (11)
56.	ES Deux Valées (9)	1–6	ESC Longueau (7)
57.	Amiens Picardie FC (13)	1–2	ES Ste Emilie/Épehy le Ronss (11)
58.	US Harbonnières (12)	0–5	Olympique Amiénois (12)
59.	US Corbie (10)	2–2 (0–3 p)	US Marchélepot (11)
60.	AS Glisy (12)	3–0	FC Estrées-Mons (12)
61.	FC Arvillers (14)	0–1	AAE Chaulnes (8)
62.	AS Davenescourt (13)	1–7	SC Moreuil (10)
63.	SC Flixecourt (10)	0–5	AS Gamaches (8)
64.	ASFR Ribemont Mericourt (13)	0–4	US Daours Vecquemont Bussy Aubigny (11)
65.	ES Pigeonnier Amiens (9)	6–2	ES Chépy (10)
66.	US Béthencourt-sur-Mer (11)	1–2	Association Longpre-Long Conde (12)
67.	ES Cagny (12)	0–2	AS Villers-Bretonneux (8)
68.	US Lignières-Châtelain (11)	2–2 (4–2 p)	FC Saleux (9)
69.	SC Pont Remy (11)	2–3	US Ouvriere Albert (9)
70.	AS St Sauveur (10)	2–3	CO Albert Sport (7)
71.	FC Oisemont (11)	0–3	JS Miannay Lambercourt (8)
72.	ASC Bourdon (14)	0–7	US Abbeville (9)
73.	ES Licourt (12)	1–8	AS Airaines-Allery (9)
74.	Conty Lœuilly SC (8)	2–0	FC La Montoye (8)
75.	CO Woignarue (11)	1–1 (4–5 p)	US Nibas Fressenneville (9)
76.	ABC2F Candas (12)	3–1	US Rosières (9)
77.	US Moyenneville (13)	1–7	AS Querrieu (10)
78.	Amiens SO (13)	0–3	CS Crécy-en-Ponthieu (11)
79.	US Friville-Escarbotin (8)	1–4	RC Amiens (7)
80.	Olympique Eaucourtois (12)	2–3	JS Quevauvillers (8)
81.	AS Hautvillers-Ouville (13)	0–6	RC Doullens (7)
82.	FC Porto Portugais Amiens (8)	3–1	Montdidier AC (7)
83.	AJ Argœuves (13)	3–2	USC Portugais de St Ouen (11)
84.	Marle Sports (9)	0–3	Stade Portugais St Quentin (10)
85.	ASPTT Laon (13)	1–4	US Rozoy-sur-Serre (11)
86.	Entente CAFC Péronne (8)	1–4	Gauchy-Grugies-Biette (8)

=== Second round (Nord-Pas de Calais) ===
These matches were played on 4 September 2016.

Second round results: Nord-Pas de Calais

Tie no	Home team (tier)	Score	Away team (tier)
1.	AS Roclincourt (15)	0–3	ASC Camblain-l'Abbé (13)
2.	AJ Ruitz (15)	0–6	ES Anzin-St Aubin (12)
3.	AS Loison (11)	0–4	UAS Harnes (12)
4.	FC Busnes (15)	1–9	US Lestrem (12)
5.	EC Mazingarbe (12)	0–2	US Gonnehem-Busnettes (10)
6.	AS Neuvireuil-Gavrelle (14)	2–1 (a.e.t.)	AS Maroeuil (12)
7.	ASPTT Arras (12)	2–3	AAE Aix-Noulette (12)
8.	Olympique Burbure (12)	3–0	US Annezin (11)
9.	ES St Laurent-Blangy (11)	1–2	US Billy-Berclau (9)
10.	ES Labeuvrière (10)	2–2 (4–5 p)	AG Grenay (11)
11.	AS Ste Barbe-Oignies (9)	0–4	US Vermelles (7)
12.	AFCL Liebaut (11)	4–1	Sud Artois (12)
13.	AS Barlin (13)	3–4	AS Sailly-Labourse (12)
14.	ES Vendin (12)	void (Note: The match was abandoned in the 67th minute (with the scoreline 1–0), after an altercation which led to a pitch invasion and the assault of a club official. Both sides were subsequently penalised and removed from the competition.)	FC Camblain-Châtelain (12)
15.	Stade Héninois (15)	2–3 (a.e.t.)	JF Mazingarbe (12)
16.	Thélus FC (15)	0–3 (Note: The match was abandoned in the 89th minute (with the scoreline 0–3). The match was investigated by the Regional Discipline Commission of the Ligue de Football Nord-Pas de Calais. Thélus FC were penalised and removed from the competition.)	US Pas-en-Artois (13)
17.	AS Auchy-les-Mines (13)	1–7	CS Diana Liévin (11)
18.	RC Labourse (12)	5–1	SC Fouquières (13)
19.	SC Artésien (12)	1–3	SC St Nicolas-lez-Arras (9)
20.	US Grenay (12)	1–0	Carabiniers Billy-Montigny (9)
21.	FC Servins (9)	2–1	USO Bruay-la-Buissière (8)
22.	Diables Rouges Lambres-lez-Aire (12)	2–7	Espérance Calonne Liévin (8)
23.	USO Meurchin (10)	0–2	CS Avion (7)
24.	CS Pernes (12)	2–3 (a.e.t.)	Olympique Liévin (12)
25.	US Houdain (12)	0–1	US St Pol-sur-Ternoise (8)
26.	ES Laventie (10)	0–3	US St Maurice Loos-en-Gohelle (8)
27.	AAE Dourges (11)	0–1	SC Pro Patria Wingles (9)
28.	OS Annequin (12)	2–1	FC Bouvigny-Boyeffles (9)
29.	ES Haisnes (12)	2–3	Calonne-Ricouart FC Cite 6 (9)
30.	US Courcelles (14)	6–0	AS Brebières (13)
31.	ES Buissy-Baralle (15)	0–2	CS Habarcq (13)
32.	FC Estevelles (14)	1–4	US Auchelloise Jeune (13)
33.	JS Écourt-St Quentin (11)	1–6	ES Bully-les-Mines (7)
34.	AS Violaines (12)	0–3	US Nœux-les-Mines (7)
35.	Olympique Heninois (13)	1–7	US Noyelles-sous-Lens (10)
36.	ES Angres (14)	5–1	SCF Achicourt (15)
37.	US Lapugnoy (13)	1–2	OS Aire-sur-la-Lys (7)
38.	Intrépides Norrent-Fontes (14)	1–2	US Hesdigneul (13)
39.	AS Robecq (14)	1–9	ESD Isbergues (9)
40.	US Izel-lès-Équerchin (15)	2–1	AJ Artois (12)
41.	US Beuvry (13)	1–0	UC Divion (13)
42.	USO Rinxent (11)	1–0	ES Calaisis Coulogne (9)
43.	CAP Le Portel (11)	0–4	Éclair Neufchâtel-Hardelot (9)
44.	CS Watten (11)	1–6	ES Enquin-les-Mines (9)
45.	AS Esquerdes (13)	1–0	AS St Martin-au-Laërt (12)
46.	FC Wavrans-sur-l'Aa (11)	3–2	US Dohem-Avroult-Cléty (12)
47.	AC Tubersent (14)	3–3 (5–4 p)	RC Bréquerecque Ostrohove (12)
48.	JS Desvroise (10)	3–0	AF Étaples Haute Ville (10)
49.	FC Fréthun (15)	1–3	FC Isques (14)
50.	SL Alincthun (14)	2–0	RC Lottinghen (15)
51.	Le Portel GPF (15)	2–3	US Ambleteuse (12)
52.	CA Vieille-Église (14)	0–4	FJEP Fort Vert (12)
53.	ES St Omer Rural (11)	1–2	ES Arques (9)
54.	ES Licques (11)	2–4	Olympique St Martin Boulogne (9)
55.	ASC Arc International (12)	0–0 (5–4 p)	AS Tournehem (11)
56.	AS Nortkerque 95 (10)	2–3 (a.e.t.)	FC Tatinghem (8)
57.	ES Mametz (12)	0–2	Recques FC (11)
58.	AS Wierre-Effroy (11)	0–2	US Blériot-Plage (9)
59.	US Créquy-Planquette (11)	0–4	US Montreuil (9)
60.	Calais Beau-Marais (10)	1–7	JS Longuenesse (8)
61.	FC Sangatte (11)	1–2	AS Audruicq (9)
62.	AS Maresquel (14)	2–7	ES Beaurainville (11)
63.	Amicale Pont-de-Briques (13)	1–2	ES St Léonard (11)
64.	US Vaudringhem (13)	0–5	FCP Blendecques (12)
65.	FC Conti (10)	0–3	SC Coquelles (9)
66.	ES Roquetoire (12)	2–1	JS Renescuroise (11)
67.	AS Cucq (10)	2–2 (5–4 p)	AS Outreau (8)
68.	US Thérouanne (13)	1–2	Longuenesse Malafoot (11)
69.	US Hardinghen (14)	0–6	FC Campagne-lès-Guines (11)
70.	CA Éperlecques (10)	0–0 (5–6 p)	ES Guînes (8)
71.	ACO Aiglon (10)	0–1	Amicale Pascal Calais (7)
72.	Olympique Hesdin-Marconne (10)	1–1 (2–4 p)	AS Berck (9)
73.	US Marais de Gûines (11)	1–6	Olympique Lumbrois (7)
74.	US Dannes (12)	4–3	Verton FC (12)
75.	JS Créquoise Loison (13)	1–5	AS Conchil-le-Temple (13)
76.	US Bourthes (10)	1–3	AS Étaples (8)
77.	AL Camiers (11)	0–2	US Attin (10)
78.	RC Offekerque (14)	1–0	Amicale Balzac (12)
79.	AS Fruges (13)	0–3	US Nielles-lès-Bléquin (10)
80.	RC Samer (11)	3–2	US Hesdin-l'Abbé (12)
81.	Wignehies Olympique (15)	void (Note: The referee abandoned the match after 51 minutes (with the scoreline 1–0) after an altercation involving players from both sides and spectators. Both teams were penalised and removed from the competition.)	JS Avesnelloise (17)
82.	US Glageon (14)	5–1	FC St Hilaire-sur-Helpe (14)
83.	US Bousies (13)	3–2	US Prisches (14)
84.	Maubeuge FCCA (14)	1–0 (a.e.t.)	Red Star Jeumont (16)
85.	SC St Remy-du-Nord (13)	0–2	US Cousolre (12)
86.	AS Douzies (10)	1–2	FC Avesnes-sur-Helpe (9)
87.	IC Ferrière-la-Grande (12)	0–2	FC Marpent (11)
88.	OSC Assevent (12)	3–1	US Villersoise (14)
89.	US Berlaimont (11)	0–1	ASG Louvroil (9)
90.	US Gommegnies-Carnoy (10)	2–2 (5–3 p)	AS Hautmont (9)
91.	SCEPS Pont-sur-Sambre (15)	0–2	SC Bachant (13)
92.	US Englefontaine (17)	1–2	AS Montay (16)
93.	Sports Podéens Réunis (11)	2–1	ES Villers-Outréaux (9)
94.	US St Souplet (14)	2–1	US Élincourt (12)
95.	AS Neuvilly (14)	2–2 (2–1 p)	US Bertry-Clary (15)
96.	Entente Ligny/Olympique Caullery (15)	1–0	US Beauvois Fontaine (14)
97.	SC Fontaine-au-Pire (15)	2–2 (4–3 p)	OC Avesnois (14)
98.	ES Caudry (9)	1–3	AC Cambrai (7)
99.	FC Iwuy (14)	0–2	US Fontaine-Notre-Dame (12)
100.	Olympique St Ollois (15)	1–1 (5–4 p)	SS Marcoing (13)
101.	OM Cambrai Amérique (12)	7–2	US Haussy (13)
102.	US St Aubert (11)	2–3	CAS Escaudœuvres (8)
103.	RC Lécluse (14)	0–1 (a.e.t.)	ES Paillencourt-Estrun (12)
104.	USCL Lewarde (15)	1–3	ESM Hamel (14)
105.	US Auberchicourt (14)	2–1	FC Férin (12)
106.	US Hordain (9)	1–4 (a.e.t.)	US Escaudin (8)
107.	SC Guesnain (8)	0–1	Olympique Senséen (7)
108.	FC Masny (11)	0–2	ES Lambresienne (8)
109.	Olympique Marquette (14)	2–1	US Loffre-Erchin (13)
110.	US Mineurs Waziers (8)	1–0	SC Douai (8)
111.	AS Sin-le-Noble (9)	2–1	Stade Orchésien (9)
112.	Les Épis Foot (13)	0–2	AEF Leforest (9)
113.	DC Lallaing (14)	2–5	US Pont Flers (13)
114.	FC Roost-Warendin (13)	1–5	UF Anhiers (12)
115.	FC Nomain (16)	0–4	Olympique Flinois (13)
116.	US Pecquencourt (14)	0–1	Olympic Marchiennois (15)
117.	US Erre-Hornaing (11)	0–3	AS Beuvry-la-Forêt (9)
118.	ES Bouchain (13)	1–2	Douchy FC (12)
119.	ES Mastaing FC (17)	1–3	SC Lourches (13)
120.	AF Rieulay (16)	4–11	JS Abscon (13)
121.	SC Aniche (10)	1–1 (3–0 p)	IC La Sentinelle (8)
122.	EA Prouvy (13)	2–5	SA Le Quesnoy (13)
123.	FC Quarouble (9)	2–1 (a.e.t.)	Dutemple FC Valenciennes (7)
124.	FC Jenlain (16)	0–4	AS Curgies (14)
125.	AS Château-l'Abbaye (13)	2–0	FC Lecelles-Rosult (12)
126.	Bayonne Sport Hergnies (16)	2–0	SC Vicq (16)
127.	JO Wallers-Arenberg (12)	1–3	FC Famars (13)
128.	AS Artres (15)	1–3	St Saulve Foot (14)
129.	Bruay Sports (10)	1–2	AS Raismes Vicoigne (7)
130.	ES Crespin (12)	0–3	Vieux Condé (11)
131.	Maing FC (11)	4–0	Anzin FARC (11)
132.	FC Cambrai-St Roch (15)	1–2	FC Saulzoir (13)
133.	US Rousies (14)	3–0	US Briquette (11)
134.	AS Hellemmes (9)	6–2	JA Armentières (7)
135.	FC Bondues (9)	2–3	US Lesquin (7)
136.	ESC Illies-Aubers-Lorgies (9)	1–4	Olympique Marcquois (7)
137.	Leers OF (9)	2–2 (3–2 p)	OS Fives (7)
138.	IC Lambersart (9)	0–0 (3–1 p)	FC Lille Sud (7)
139.	JS Lille Wazemmes (9)	3–1 (a.e.t.)	FA Neuvilloise (7)
140.	SCO Roubaix 59 (9)	2–3	Villeneuve-d'Ascq Métropole (7)
141.	Olympique Hémois (10)	2–0	US Ascq (8)
142.	CG Haubourdin (10)	1–1 (3–2 p)	US Marquette (8)
143.	ES Weppes (10)	1–0 (a.e.t.)	US Portugais Roubaix Tourcoing (8)
144.	FC Lambersart (10)	1–2	Mons AC (8)
145.	US St André (10)	2–2 (4–5 p)	US Lille Moulins Carrel (8)
146.	ACS Comines (10)	0–1	CS Wasquehal (8)
147.	US Wattrelos (10)	3–1	ES Mouvaux (8)
148.	JS Steenwerck (11)	0–1	CS La Gorgue (9)
149.	Verlinghem Foot (11)	0–2	AO Sainghinoise (9)
150.	AS St Jean-Baptiste Roubaix (14)	1–4	FC Forestois (13)
151.	FC Templemars-Vendeville (12)	0–1 (a.e.t.)	ES Cappelle-Pont-à-Marcq (11)
152.	US Antillais Lille Métropole (12)	2–5	CS Erquinghem-Lys (11)
153.	UJS Cheminots Tourcoing (12)	0–3 (Note: The match was abandoned on 117 minutes (with the scoreline 2–3). UJS Cheminots Toucoing were penalised and removed from the competition. FC Wambrechies progress to the third round.)	FC Wambrechies (11)
154.	FC Deûlémont (12)	1–3	OSM Sequedin (10)
155.	Stella Lys (10)	3–1	ES Roncq (9)
156.	FC Sailly-lez-Lannoy (12)	1–3	EAC Cysoing-Wannehain-Bourghelles (12)
157.	Faches-Thumesnil FC (12)	1–4	US Provin (12)
158.	Olympique Mérignies (13)	0–6	FC Santes (10)
159.	EC Camphin-en-Pévèle (13)	3–2	US Phalempin (12)
160.	FC Wattignies (11)	2–3	RC Bois-Blancs Lille (11)
161.	FA Blanc Seau (12)	1–0	Football St Michel Quesnoy (13)
162.	JS Wavrin-Don (11)	7–1	CS Gondecourt (12)
163.	AS Dunkerque Sud (9)	0–4	US Gravelines (7)
164.	RC Bergues (10)	0–2	US Arnèke (8)
165.	JS Ghyveldoise (10)	1–4	US Esquelbecq (8)
166.	SM Petite-Synthe (13)	2–2 (1–3 p)	AS Dockers Dunkerque (11)
167.	US Bray-Dunes (12)	0–6	US Téteghem (10)
168.	US Wallon-Cappel (13)	1–5	FC Bierne (10)
169.	US Mardyck (13)	1–2	US Bavinchove-Cassel (11)
170.	SC Bourbourg (10)	0–2	US Warhem (11)
171.	FC Steene (11)	1–3	AS Steenvorde (10)
172.	ACS Hoymille (12)	1–6	ES Wormhout (10)
173.	SC Grand-Fort-Philippe (9)	7–1	US Yser (10)
174.	ASC Hazebrouck (10)	1–3	FC Loon-Plage (7)

== Third round ==
=== Third round (Picardie) ===
These matches were played on 10, 11 and 21 September 2016.

Third round results: Picardie

Tie no	Home team (tier)	Score	Away team (tier)
1.	Gauchy-Grugies-Biette (8)	0–2	US Roye-Noyon (5)
2.	Conty Lœuilly SC (8)	1–7	SC Abbeville (6)
3.	US Chauny (7)	4–1	CS Liancourt-Ratigny (7)
4.	Olympique Amiénois (12)	0–3	USR St Crépin-Ibouvillers (9)
5.	US St Germer-de-Fly (10)	0–0 (8–9 p)	AFC Creil (7)
6.	US Abbeville (9)	2–1	US Fouquenies (10)
7.	SC Moreuil (10)	1–3	AS Gamaches (8)
8.	US Cires-lès-Mello (8)	3–1	FC Centuloise (8)
9.	Entente Itancourt-Neuville (6)	0–1	FC Ailly-sur-Somme Samara (5)
10.	Grandvilliers AC (9)	0–0 (4–3 p)	US Crépy Vivaise (10)
11.	US Daours Vecquemont Bussy Aubigny (11)	2–1	US Bruyères-et-Montbérault (8)
12.	ESC Longueau (7)	4–2	US Balagny-St Epin (6)
13.	FC Eches-Fosseuse (11)	0–1	CS Chaumont-en-Vexin (8)
14.	UA Fère-en-Tardenois (9)	2–4	US Ribécourt (9)
15.	L'Arsenal Club Achery-Beautor-Charmes (8)	0–1	US Camon (6)
16.	RC Amiens (7)	0–2	US Chantilly (6)
17.	US Attichy (13)	0–15	AS Beauvais Oise (5)
18.	CS Avilly-St Léonard (10)	0–3	USE St Leu d'Esserent (8)
19.	US Rozoy-sur-Serre (11)	0–3	Stade Ressontois (9)
20.	AmS St Sauveur (9)	1–4	FC Soissons (6)
21.	US Marchélepot (11)	4–0	AS Glisy (12)
22.	Internationale Soissonnaise (7)	1–3	Château Thierry-Étampes FC (7)
23.	US Ouvriere Albert (9)	1–5	US Ribemont Mezieres FC (9)
24.	AS Querrieu (10)	4–1	RC Clermont (8)
25.	Stade Portugais St Quentin (10)	2–4	US Breteuil (7)
26.	FC Villers Cotterêts (9)	1–2	US St Maximin (7)
27.	JS Miannay Lambercourt (8)	1–2	USM Senlisienne (5)
28.	FC Cauffry (9)	2–1	FC Longueil-Annel (8)
29.	US Lignières-Châtelain (11)	1–2	SAS Moy de l'Aisne (8)
30.	AJ Argœuves (13)	2–6	US Guignicourt (7)
31.	ES Ste Emilie/Épehy le Ronss (11)	3–2	FC Monceau Les Leups (10)
32.	JS Quevauvillers (8)	2–0	Le Nouvion AC (9)
33.	US Lassigny (10)	1–0	ES Pigeonnier Amiens (9)
34.	FFC Chéry-lès-Pouilly (10)	0–9	FC Porto Portugais Amiens (8)
35.	US Étouy (7)	2–0	US Choisy-au-Bac (6)
36.	US Bresloise (10)	2–3	US Crépy-en-Valois (8)
37.	US Chevrières-Grandfresnoy (7)	2–0	US Laon (6)
38.	US Lamorlaye (9)	3–4	CO Albert Sport (7)
39.	FC Mézières (12)	2–0	RC Bohain (8)
40.	CS Crécy-en-Ponthieu (11)	0–5	ICS Créçois (7)
41.	FC Fontainettes St Aubin (13)	1–9	Olympique Saint-Quentin (5)
42.	CS Haudivillers (11)	0–5	Tergnier FC (6)
43.	ABC2F Candas (12)	2–4	AAE Chaulnes (8)
44.	AFC Holnon-Fayet (10)	1–3	US Pont Ste-Maxence (7)
45.	AS Airaines-Allery (9)	2–1	SC St Just-en-Chaussée (7)
46.	AS Villers-Bretonneux (8)	0–1	US Estrées-St Denis (9)
47.	US Nanteuil FC (10)	1–5	Harly Quentin (8)
48.	FC Béthisy (9)	2–1	US Nibas Fressenneville (9)
49.	Association Longpre-Long Conde (12)	1–4	ESUS Buironfosse-La Capelle (10)
50.	RC Doullens (7)	0–3	AFC Compiègne (6)
51.	US Margny-lès-Compiègne (9)	1–3	AS du Pays Neslois (6)

=== Third round (Nord-Pas de Calais) ===
These matches were played on 11 September 2016.

Third round results: Nord-Pas de Calais

Tie no	Home team (tier)	Score	Away team (tier)
1.	US Rousies (14)	4–0	OSC Assevent (12)
2.	SC Lourches (13)	1–2	CAS Escaudœuvres (8)
3.	ES Paillencourt-Estrun (12)	2–1 (a.e.t.)	US Cousolre (12)
4.	St Saulve Foot (14)	5–1	SC Fontaine-au-Pire (15)
5.	Entente Ligny/Olympique Caullery (15)	0–2	US Gommegnies-Carnoy (10)
6.	US Glageon (14)	0–5	FC Marpent (11)
7.	SC Aniche (10)	0–3	AS Raismes Vicoigne (7)
8.	FC Avesnes-sur-Helpe (9)	2–4	US Mineurs Waziers (8)
9.	Maubeuge FCCA (14)	1–9	St Amand FC (6)
10.	AS Neuvilly (14)	0–3	ASG Louvroil (9)
11.	US Fontaine-Notre-Dame (12)	0–2	AS Beuvry-la-Forêt (9)
12.	Olympic Marchiennois (15)	1–5	Sports Podéens Réunis (11)
13.	SC Bachant (13)	0–14	Feignies Aulnoye FC (5)
14.	Olympique Flinois (13)	1–0	US Bousies (13)
15.	US St Souplet (14)	1–3	UF Anhiers (12)
16.	Bayonne Sport Hergnies (16)	1–3	ES Val Sensée (14)
17.	FC Famars (13)	1–2	US Auberchicourt (14)
18.	US Izel-lès-Équerchin (15)	1–6	ES Lambresienne (8)
19.	EAC Cysoing-Wannehain-Bourghelles (12)	0–8	US Maubeuge (5)
20.	ESM Hamel (14)	0–10	AC Cambrai (7)
21.	US Courcelles (14)	0–0 (3–5 p)	US Billy-Berclau (9)
22.	Olympique Marquette (14)	0–6	US Biachoise (6)
23.	AS Montay (16)	1–4	FC Santes (10)
24.	ES Anzin-St Aubin (12)	1–0	US Grenay (12)
25.	Maing FC (11)	1–2	US Escaudin (8)
26.	US Pont Flers (13)	5–1	SA Le Quesnoy (13)
27.	Olympique St Ollois (15)	0–3	AO Sainghinoise (9)
28.	JS Abscon (13)	1–2	AS Curgies (14)
29.	FC Saulzoir (13)	6–2 (a.e.t.)	AS Château-l'Abbaye (13)
30.	SC St Nicolas-lez-Arras (9)	2–2 (3–4 p)	Olympique Senséen (7)
31.	CS Habarcq (13)	3–4	Vieux Condé (11)
32.	CS Diana Liévin (11)	3–1	Olympique Lumbrois (7)
33.	OS Annequin (12)	1–0	OSM Sequedin (10)
34.	JS Wavrin-Don (11)	0–3	US Nœux-les-Mines (7)
35.	AG Grenay (11)	1–3	ES Bully-les-Mines (7)
36.	JF Mazingarbe (12)	1–0	AS Sin-le-Noble (9)
37.	Calonne-Ricouart FC Cite 6 (9)	3–1	JS Lille Wazemmes (9)
38.	ES Angres (14)	1–8	CS Avion (7)
39.	ES Enquin-les-Mines (9)	0–2	SC Hazebrouck (6)
40.	FC Servins (9)	1–7	Stade Béthunois (6)
41.	US Gonnehem-Busnettes (10)	0–0 (1–3 p)	AEF Leforest (9)
42.	ASC Camblain-l'Abbé (13)	2–5	US St Maurice Loos-en-Gohelle (8)
43.	Espérance Calonne Liévin (8)	0–3	OS Aire-sur-la-Lys (7)
44.	AS Sailly-Labourse (12)	1–6	AS Steenvorde (10)
45.	AS Neuvireuil-Gavrelle (14)	0–4	US Beuvry (13)
46.	ES Weppes (10)	2–0	US St Pol-sur-Ternoise (8)
47.	ES Cappelle-Pont-à-Marcq (11)	2–0	FA Blanc Seau (12)
48.	UAS Harnes (12)	0–7	Olympique Marcquois (7)
49.	AAE Aix-Noulette (12)	2–3 (a.e.t.)	Leers OF (9)
50.	Douchy FC (12)	0–7	US Tourcoing FC (5)
51.	AS Hellemmes (9)	2–1	US Lesquin (7)
52.	FC Forestois (13)	1–5	Villeneuve-d'Ascq Métropole (7)
53.	RC Bois-Blancs Lille (11)	0–3 (Note: The game was abandoned after 85 minutes (with the scoreline 0–3) after objects were thrown at the referee from the stands. The match was referred to the Commission Régionale de Discipline, who penalised RC Bois-Blancs Lille. Olympique Hémois progress to the third round.)	Olympique Hémois (10)
54.	US Lille Moulins Carrel (8)	0–2	CS La Gorgue (9)
55.	SC Pro Patria Wingles (9)	0–1	Roubaix SC (6)
56.	IC Lambersart (9)	2–3 (a.e.t.)	FC Seclin (6)
57.	CS Erquinghem-Lys (11)	2–3	Stella Lys (10)
58.	EC Camphin-en-Pévèle (13)	1–4	US Wattrelos (10)
59.	Olympique Liévin (12)	4–2	Mons AC (8)
60.	US Noyelles-sous-Lens (10)	1–1 (4–2 p)	CS Wasquehal (8)
61.	US Provin (12)	1–4	OM Cambrai Amérique (12)
62.	US Lestrem (12)	1–7	US Saint-Omer (6)
63.	US Arnèke (8)	1–0	ESD Isbergues (9)
64.	US Téteghem (10)	0–4	US Vermelles (7)
65.	ES Roquetoire (12)	0–5	FC Tatinghem (8)
66.	SL Alincthun (14)	0–8	US Bavinchove-Cassel (11)
67.	ES Wormhout (10)	0–3	AFCL Liebaut (11)
68.	US Hesdigneul (13)	2–3 (a.e.t.)	ES Guînes (8)
69.	FCP Blendecques (12)	1–4	FC Loon-Plage (7)
70.	FC Bierne (10)	2–1	SC Grand-Fort-Philippe (9)
71.	AC Tubersent (14)	1–3	US Blériot-Plage (9)
72.	US Auchelloise Jeune (13)	1–2	FC Isques (14)
73.	FC Wavrans-sur-l'Aa (11)	1–5	AS Audruicq (9)
74.	RC Labourse (12)	0–1	ES Arques (9)
75.	Longuenesse Malafoot (11)	0–12	FC Dunkerque-Malo Plage (6)
76.	AS Dockers Dunkerque (11)	1–9	Olympique Grande-Synthe (5)
77.	ASC Arc International (12)	1–3 (a.e.t.)	Éclair Neufchâtel-Hardelot (9)
78.	US Gravelines (7)	0–3	Le Touquet AC (6)
79.	SC Coquelles (9)	1–4	Amicale Pascal Calais (7)
80.	AS Conchil-le-Temple (13)	5–1	JS Blangy-sur-Ternoise (14)
81.	US Ambleteuse (12)	0–14	AS Étaples (8)
82.	US Attin (10)	1–2	JS Longuenesse (8)
83.	ES Beaurainville (11)	2–2 (5–6 p)	ES St Léonard (11)
84.	US Nielles-lès-Bléquin (10)	0–2	Olympique St Martin Boulogne (9)
85.	RC Offekerque (14)	2–0 (a.e.t.)	FJEP Fort Vert (12)
86.	FC Campagne-lès-Guines (11)	0–4	Stade Portelois (6)
87.	USO Rinxent (11)	0–10	AS Marck (5)
88.	US Dannes (12)	2–3	AS Berck (9)
89.	JS Desvroise (10)	1–1 (2–4 p)	US Esquelbecq (8)
90.	US Montreuil (9)	1–1 (3–0 p)	AS Cucq (10)
91.	AS Esquerdes (13)	1–3	RC Samer (11)
92.	Recques FC (11)	4–0	Olympique Burbure (12)
93.	FC Wambrechies (11)	1–2	CG Haubourdin (10)
94.	US Pas-en-Artois (13)	1–0	US Warhem (11)

== Fourth round ==
=== Fourth round (Picardie) ===
These matches were played on 24 and 25 September and 2 October 2016.

Fourth round results: Picardie

Tie no	Home team (tier)	Score	Away team (tier)
1.	US Ribemont Mezieres FC (9)	0–2	AC Amiens (4)
2.	US Camon (6)	0–2	AS Beauvais Oise (5)
3.	ICS Créçois (7)	3–1	Tergnier FC (6)
4.	AS Gamaches (8)	2–1	US Abbeville (9)
5.	US Marchélepot (11)	0–2	US Estrées-St Denis (9)
6.	US Breteuil (7)	1–2	ESC Longueau (7)
7.	AS Airaines-Allery (9)	1–1 (1–4 p)	US Étouy (7)
8.	US Pont Ste-Maxence (7)	2–1	US Crépy-en-Valois (8)
9.	US Ribécourt (9)	0–3	US Guignicourt (7)
10.	FC Béthisy (9)	4–2	AFC Creil (7)
11.	CO Albert Sport (7)	1–1 (2–3 p)	JS Quevauvillers (8)
12.	FC Mézières (12)	2–3	US St Maximin (7)
13.	US Chevrières-Grandfresnoy (7)	1–1 (5–6 p)	USM Senlisienne (5)
14.	AS Querrieu (10)	2–3 (a.e.t.)	FC Porto Portugais Amiens (8)
15.	ESUS Buironfosse-La Capelle (10)	0–4 (a.e.t.)	USE St Leu d'Esserent (8)
16.	US Chantilly (6)	5–1	FC Soissons (6)
17.	AFC Compiègne (6)	2–0	Château Thierry-Étampes FC (7)
18.	FC Cauffry (9)	0–3	Olympique Saint-Quentin (5)
19.	SAS Moy de l'Aisne (8)	1–2	US Chauny (7)
20.	US Cires-lès-Mello (8)	1–3 (a.e.t.)	AS du Pays Neslois (6)
21.	Harly Quentin (8)	1–2	FC Ailly-sur-Somme Samara (5)
22.	US Daours Vecquemont Bussy Aubigny (11)	0–3	Stade Ressontois (9)
23.	ES Ste Emilie/Épehy le Ronss (11)	0–3	SC Abbeville (6)
24.	US Lassigny (10)	1–4	US Roye-Noyon (5)
25.	CS Chaumont-en-Vexin (8)	3–0 (Note: Game won by forfeit)	AAE Chaulnes (8)

=== Fourth round (Nord-Pas de Calais) ===
These matches were played on 24 and 25 September 2016.

Fourth round results: Nord-Pas de Calais

Tie no	Home team (tier)	Score	Away team (tier)
1.	FC Loon-Plage (7)	1–4	Olympique Grande-Synthe (5)
2.	Le Touquet AC (6)	4–1	Olympique Senséen (7)
3.	OM Cambrai Amérique (12)	1–0	FC Quarouble (9)
4.	Recques FC (11)	1–0	US Esquelbecq (8)
5.	US Bavinchove-Cassel (11)	0–3	CS La Gorgue (9)
6.	US Blériot-Plage (9)	0–3	SC Hazebrouck (6)
7.	AS Conchil-le-Temple (13)	0–1	ES Arques (9)
8.	US Saint-Omer (6)	3–1	Amicale Pascal Calais (7)
9.	FC Santes (10)	0–3	AS Berck (9)
10.	OS Aire-sur-la-Lys (7)	2–2 (5–4 p)	Éclair Neufchâtel-Hardelot (9)
11.	Roubaix SC (6)	1–2	ES Bully-les-Mines (7)
12.	Olympique Liévin (12)	0–6	US Tourcoing FC (5)
13.	RC Samer (11)	1–7	Calais RUFC (4)
14.	AS Steenvorde (10)	2–1	JS Longuenesse (8)
15.	AS Audruicq (9)	1–2	AS Étaples (8)
16.	AS Marck (5)	9–0	ES Val Sensée (14)
17.	ES Anzin-St Aubin (12)	0–2	Stade Portelois (6)
18.	US Montreuil (9)	4–1 (a.e.t.)	FC Bierne (10)
19.	ES St Léonard (11)	0–5	Villeneuve-d'Ascq Métropole (7)
20.	JF Mazingarbe (12)	0–9	US Nœux-les-Mines (7)
21.	US Billy-Berclau (9)	4–1	US Arnèke (8)
22.	AFCL Liebaut (11)	3–0	AO Sainghinoise (9)
23.	US Beuvry (13)	1–2 (a.e.t.)	ES Weppes (10)
24.	OS Annequin (12)	3–1	Calonne-Ricouart FC Cite 6 (9)
25.	Stade Béthunois (6)	3–0	US Vermelles (7)
26.	FC Dunkerque-Malo Plage (6)	1–5	IC Croix (4)
27.	UF Anhiers (12)	1–4	ES Wasquehal (4)
28.	St Saulve Foot (14)	3–3 (6–5 p)	Stella Lys (10)
29.	US Rousies (14)	1–0	Olympique Flinois (13)
30.	US Escaudin (8)	1–3	AS Beuvry-la-Forêt (9)
31.	ASG Louvroil (9)	1–7	US Vimy (6)
32.	AC Cambrai (7)	1–0	ES Lambresienne (8)
33.	ES Paillencourt-Estrun (12)	2–6	Leers OF (9)
34.	ES Cappelle-Pont-à-Marcq (11)	1–6	Feignies Aulnoye FC (5)
35.	AS Curgies (14)	1–0	US Gommegnies-Carnoy (10)
36.	US Wattrelos (10)	0–0 (3–4 p)	AS Raismes Vicoigne (7)
37.	US Auberchicourt (14)	1–8	St Amand FC (6)
38.	CS Diana Liévin (11)	1–2	US St Maurice Loos-en-Gohelle (8)
39.	CG Haubourdin (10)	3–1	FC Tatinghem (8)
40.	AS Hellemmes (9)	0–4	Arras FA (4)
41.	AEF Leforest (9)	1–2	US Maubeuge (5)
42.	US Mineurs Waziers (8)	2–0	US Biachoise (6)
43.	US Noyelles-sous-Lens (10)	2–1	CAS Escaudœuvres (8)
44.	Olympique Hémois (10)	0–2	Olympique Marcquois (7)
45.	US Pas-en-Artois (13)	1–2	Olympique St Martin Boulogne (9)
46.	FC Isques (14)	1–1 (1–3 p)	Vieux Condé (11)
47.	RC Offekerque (14)	1–2	Sports Podéens Réunis (11)
48.	US Pont Flers (13)	1–2	ES Guînes (8)
49.	FC Marpent (11)	1–2 (a.e.t.)	CS Avion (7)
50.	FC Saulzoir (13)	0–1 (a.e.t.)	FC Seclin (6)

== Fifth round ==
=== Fifth round (Picardie) ===
These matches were played on 9 October 2016.

Fifth round results: Picardie

Tie no	Home team (tier)	Score	Away team (tier)
1.	Stade Ressontois (9)	2–1	AS Gamaches (8)
2.	US Chauny (7)	1–0	SC Abbeville (6)
3.	US Chantilly (6)	2–2 (4–3 p)	AC Amiens (4)
4.	US Étouy (7)	1–3	Olympique Saint-Quentin (5)
5.	AS du Pays Neslois (6)	1–3	AFC Compiègne (6)
6.	FC Porto Portugais Amiens (8)	1–2	US Roye-Noyon (5)
7.	US St Maximin (7)	4–1	CS Chaumont-en-Vexin (8)
8.	USR St Crépin-Ibouvillers (9)	0–2	US Guignicourt (7)
9.	FC Béthisy (9)	0–4	USM Senlisienne (5)
10.	USE St Leu d'Esserent (8)	1–0	Grandvilliers AC (9)
11.	US Estrées-St Denis (9)	0–4	FC Chambly (3)
12.	FC Ailly-sur-Somme Samara (5)	0–0 (3–4 p)	AS Beauvais Oise (5)
13.	JS Quevauvillers (8)	1–2 (a.e.t.)	ICS Créçois (7)
14.	ESC Longueau (7)	2–0	US Pont Ste-Maxence (7)

=== Fifth round (Nord-Pas de Calais) ===
These matches were played on 8 and 9 October 2016.

Fifth round results: Nord-Pas de Calais

Tie no	Home team (tier)	Score	Away team (tier)
1.	ES Arques (9)	1–2 (a.e.t.)	US Saint-Omer (6)
2.	AFCL Liebaut (11)	1–2	OS Annequin (12)
3.	IC Croix (4)	1–0	Arras FA (4)
4.	SC Hazebrouck (6)	1–0	USL Dunkerque (3)
5.	Leers OF (9)	1–0	AS Marck (5)
6.	Sports Podéens Réunis (11)	0–10	St Amand FC (6)
7.	CS La Gorgue (9)	0–1	Olympique Grande-Synthe (5)
8.	US Montreuil (9)	0–3	US Vimy (6)
9.	AS Raismes Vicoigne (7)	0–2	US Boulogne (3)
10.	AS Steenvorde (10)	1–1 (4–2 p)	FC Seclin (6)
11.	US Nœux-les-Mines (7)	2–4	Stade Portelois (6)
12.	ES Weppes (10)	0–2	CS Avion (7)
13.	St Saulve Foot (14)	1–5	AS Étaples (8)
14.	ES Guînes (8)	0–2	Feignies Aulnoye FC (5)
15.	Vieux Condé (11)	0–3	AC Cambrai (7)
16.	OS Aire-sur-la-Lys (7)	0–0 (2–4 p)	US Maubeuge (5)
17.	AS Berck (9)	2–0	US Billy-Berclau (9)
18.	US Rousies (14)	0–5	Calais RUFC (4)
19.	Villeneuve-d'Ascq Métropole (7)	2–0 (a.e.t.)	US Mineurs Waziers (8)
20.	ES Wasquehal (4)	2–1	US Tourcoing FC (5)
21.	US Noyelles-sous-Lens (10)	1–0	Le Touquet AC (6)
22.	US St Maurice Loos-en-Gohelle (8)	3–0	Olympique St Martin Boulogne (9)
23.	AS Curgies (14)	0–7	Stade Béthunois (6)
24.	Recques FC (11)	3–2 (a.e.t.)	AS Beuvry-la-Forêt (9)
25.	CG Haubourdin (10)	1–4	Olympique Marcquois (7)
26.	OM Cambrai Amérique (12)	0–9	ES Bully-les-Mines (7)
