= 2019–20 Coupe de France preliminary rounds, Hauts-de-France =

Football tournament round

The 2019–20 Coupe de France preliminary rounds, Hauts-de-France was the qualifying competition to decide which teams from the leagues of the Hauts-de-France region of France took part in the main competition from the seventh round.

A total of twenty-one teams qualified from the Hauts-de-France preliminary rounds. In 2018–19, Iris Club de Croix progressed furthest in the main competition, reaching the round of 16 before losing to Dijon.

== Schedule ==
The first two rounds of the qualifying competition took place on the weekends of 25 August and 1 September 2019. A total of 788 teams participated in the first round. 180 teams entered at the second round stage.

The third round draw took place on 5 September 2019. Ten teams from Championnat National 3 (tier 5) and 27 from Régional 1 (tier 6) joined the competition at this stage.

The fourth round draw took place on 19 September 2019. Two teams from Championnat National 2 (tier 4) joined the competition at this stage, and 82 ties were drawn.

The fifth round draw took place on 3 October 2019. Two teams from Championnat National (tier 3) joined the competition at this stage, and 42 ties were drawn.

The sixth round draw took place on 16 October 2019.

=== First round ===
These matches were played on 24 and 25 August 2019, with one match replayed on 1 September 2019.

First round results: Hauts-de-France
Tie no	Home team (tier)	Score	Away team (tier)
1.	OC Bury (12)	6–4	USR St Crépin-Ibouvillers (10)
2.	RC Campremy (12)	0–5	AS Montchrevreuil (10)
3.	FC St Just des Marais (12)	0–4	AS Verderel-lès-Sauqueuse (11)
4.	AS Noailles-Cauvigny (10)	1–3 (a.e.t.)	AS Rochy-Condé (11)
5.	AS St Samson-la-Poterie (13)	1–2	AJ Laboissière-en-Thelle (10)
6.	EC Villers/Bailleul (12)	1–4	Grandvilliers AC (9)
7.	Amicale Fleury Trie Château (12)	0–3	AS Laigneville (12)
8.	Hermes-Berthecourt AC (10)	3–1	SC Songeons (9)
9.	AS Laversines (12)	3–1	FC Angy (11)
10.	AS La Neuville-en-Hez (12)	0–1	CS Haudivillers (11)
11.	AS Coye-la-Forêt (12)	4–1	US Paillart (11)
12.	US St Germer-de-Fly (11)	0–0 (3–4 p)	EFC Dieudonné Puiseux (11)
13.	US Gaudechart (12)	3–3 (4–5 p)	AS Auneuil (10)
14.	FC Boran (11)	3–3 (0–2 p)	FC Fontainettes St Aubin (11)
15.	AS Noyers-Saint-Martin (12)	3–1	SCC Sérifontaine (10)
16.	RC Blargies (12)	2–7	US Marseille-en-Beauvaisis (10)
17.	AS La Neuville-sur-Oudeuil (10)	1–4	US Bresloise (9)
18.	US Breuil-le-Sec (11)	3–0 (Note: Tie won by means of forfeit.)	FC St Sulpice (12)
19.	US Crèvecœur-le-Grand (11)	5–2	FC Amblainville Sandricourt (11)
20.	AS Bornel (11)	8–0	AS Hénonville (12)
21.	US Ste Geneviève (11)	3–2	FC Cauffry (10)
22.	US Froissy (11)	3–4	ES Formerie (11)
23.	SC Les Marettes (13)	0–2	AS Ons-en-Bray (11)
24.	FC St Paul (11)	2–5	JS Bulles (11)
25.	FC Carlepont (11)	1–7	AS Multien (10)
26.	RC Précy (11)	0–3	US Lamorlaye (9)
27.	FC Sacy-St Martin (12)	7–1	US Beauvraignes (12)
28.	ES Compiègne (11)	2–0	AS Silly-le-Long (9)
29.	JS Thieux (12)	6–1	AS Cheminots Creil/Nogent-sur-Oise (13)
30.	AJ Mont-l'Évêque (13)	1–3	FC Golancourt (13)
31.	US Crépy-en-Valois (9)	2–17	Stade Ressontois (9)
32.	US Baugy Monchy Humières (11)	4–0	JS Guiscard (12)
33.	ES Remy (11)	1–2	ES Ormoy-Duvy (10)
34.	US Verberie (12)	1–0	AS Thourotte (11)
35.	ESC Wavignies (10)	3–1	SC Lamotte Breuil (10)
36.	US Lieuvillers (11)	3–0	AS Pontpoint (11)
37.	ASC Val d'Automne (10)	0–1	CA Venette (10)
38.	FC Nointel (11)	2–2 (1–3 p)	AS St Sauveur (Oise) (9)
39.	US Attichy (13)	0–4	AS Montmacq (12)
40.	AS Tracy-le-Mont (11)	6–3	AS Orry-La-Chapelle (10)
41.	JSA Compiègne-La Croix-St Ouen (10)	5–1	Tricot OS (11)
42.	AS Plailly (10)	1–2	US Lassigny (9)
43.	AS Maignelay-Montigny (12)	1–0	Rollot AC (12)
44.	AS St Remy-en-l'Eau (12)	1–3	Canly FC (10)
45.	FC Clairoix (10)	0–6	CS Avilly-St Léonard (9)
46.	FCJ Noyon (12)	1–3	US Plessis-Brion (9)
47.	ES Thiers-sur-Thève (12)	0–5	AS Mareuil-sur-Ourcq (12)
48.	FC Chiry-Ourscamp (12)	2–2 (2–4 p)	FC Ruraville (12)
49.	AS Vismes-au-Val (13)	0–3	AC Hallencourt (11)
50.	ASPTT Beauvais (10)	2–0	US Fouquenies (10)
51.	AS Hautvillers-Ouville (13)	1–4	ES Harondel (10)
52.	FC Ailly-Vauchelles (14)	1–4	ASIC Bouttencourt (12)
53.	AS Huppy (13)	1–3	AC Mers (11)
54.	AS Picquigny (13)	3–0	FC Vignacourt (12)
55.	AS Woincourt Dargnies (13)	1–5	SC Templiers Oisemont (11)
56.	US Quend (11)	2–3	CS Crécy-en-Ponthieu (10)
57.	AS La Chaussée-Tirancourt (15)	0–2	FC St Valéry Baie de Somme Sud (9)
58.	AS Namps-Maisnil (13)	2–4 (a.e.t.)	Poix-Blangy-Croixrault FC (10)
59.	AS Domart-en-Ponthieu (14)	0–2	Association Longpré-Long-Condé (13)
60.	AAE Feuquières-en-Vimeu (14)	6–2	JS Bourseville (13)
61.	AS Quesnoy-le-Montant (none)	0–3	US Béthencourt-sur-Mer (11)
62.	ES Chépy (12)	3–2 (a.e.t.)	AS Valines (10)
63.	Avenir Croisien (13)	3–2	AS Maisnières (13)
64.	Olympique Eaucourtois (12)	5–2	Entente Sailly-Flibeaucourt Le Titre (12)
65.	AS St Sauveur 80 (11)	2–1	US Nibas Fressenneville (10)
66.	FC Grand-Laviers (13)	0–6	FC Oisemont (10)
67.	JS Cambron (12)	4–0	FC Mareuil-Caubert (10)
68.	Avenir de l'Étoile (13)	3–4	Auxiloise (10)
69.	FC Rue-Le Crotoy (11)	0–3	SC Pont-Remy (10)
70.	US Neuilly-l'Hôpital (12)	2–4	SC Flixecourt (9)
71.	Avenir Nouvion-en-Ponthieu (12)	6–2	ES Deux Vallées (10)
72.	AS Airaines-Allery (10)	1–4	US Abbeville (9)
73.	SEP Blangy-Bouttencourt (11)	1–0	AS Talmas Picardie Fienvillers (11)
74.	US Bouillancourt-en-Sery (13)	3–2	CO Woignarue (12)
75.	Amiens FC (12)	5–6	ES Licourt (12)
76.	US Méricourt l'Abbé (13)	2–5	US Daours Vecquemont Bussy Aubigny (11)
77.	FC Arvillers (12)	1–2	ES Roye-Damery (11)
78.	US Marchélepot (11)	0–2	AS Glisy (10)
79.	Boves SC (13)	0–2	ES Sains/St Fuscien (10)
80.	AS Davenescourt (13)	0–1	AS Querrieu (11)
81.	Olympique Amiénois (11)	2–4	US Rosières (10)
82.	US Cartigny-Buire (12)	7–0	ES Ste Emilie/Épehy le Ronss (11)
83.	US Esmery-Hallon (14)	1–3	ES Vers-sur-Selle (13)
84.	FR Englebelmer (11)	2–6 (a.e.t.)	US Lignières-Châtelain (10)
85.	US Corbie (9)	2–4	ES Pigeonnier Amiens (9)
86.	ASM Rivery (13)	4–1	US Roisel (13)
87.	AS Cerisy (12)	3–0	ES Cagny (11)
88.	ABC2F Candas (12)	3–3 (5–4 p)	ASL Saveuse (13)
89.	AF Amiens (13)	3–2	US Marcelcave (12)
90.	FC Blangy-Tronville (12)	1–4	US Sailly-Saillisel (11)
91.	AJ Argœuves (13)	2–3	ASFR Ribemont Mericourt (12)
92.	FC Plessier (12)	1–0	FC Estrées-Mons (11)
93.	Olympique Le Hamel (10)	4–1	AS Prouzel-Plachy (14)
94.	AAE Bray-sur-Somme (13)	3–0	FC Saleux (none)
95.	US Flesselles (11)	2–0	US Ham (10)
96.	USC Moislains (13)	1–2	Amiens Picardie FC (11)
97.	RC Salouël (10)	1–3 (a.e.t.)	FC Méaulte (10)
98.	Rumigny FC (14)	0–4	Fraternelle Ailly-sur-Noye (11)
99.	AS Domart-sur-la-Luce (13)	0–4	Conty Lœuilly SC (9)
100.	Longuenesse Malafoot (12)	0–4	ES St Omer Rural (10)
101.	AS St Tricat et Nielles (13)	4–0	US Polincove (14)
102.	US Hardinghen (12)	1–2	AS Crémarest (12)
103.	FC Isques (12)	0–2	FLC Longfossé (10)
104.	FC Calais Caténa (10)	3–2	USO Rinxent (10)
105.	ASL Vieil-Moutier La Calique (12)	4–0	AL Camiers (10)
106.	FC Andres (15)	0–12	Recques FC (9)
107.	FC Senlecques (15)	1–3	AC Tubersent (13)
108.	US Marais de Gûines (11)	3–0	FC Nordausques (10)
109.	US Alquines (11)	3–2	AS St Martin-au-Laërt (11)
110.	JS Bonningues-lès-Ardres (13)	0–3	FCP Blendecques (9)
111.	RC Samer (12)	2–6	CO Wimille (9)
112.	JS Blangy-sur-Ternoise (13)	5–1	US Bomy (14)
113.	ES Helfaut (12)	0–4	CA Éperlecques (9)
114.	CA Vieille-Église (11)	0–1	AS Colembert (12)
115.	US Vaudringhem (14)	2–4	US Dohem-Avroult-Cléty (11)
116.	AS Portelois (14)	2–4	Le Portel GPF (13)
117.	AS Calais (13)	2–0	FC Calais Opale Bus (14)
118.	AS Boisjean (12)	1–2	AS Campagne-lès-Hesdin (10)
119.	US Hesdin-l'Abbé (11)	1–2	AF Étaples Haute Ville (10)
120.	ESL Boulogne-sur-Mer (10)	5–2	US Porteloise (9)
121.	FC Wissant (13)	0–3	RC Ardrésien (10)
122.	FR Preures-Zoteux (13)	3–6	US Coyecques (13)
123.	JS Créquoise Loison (13)	0–3	FC Merlimont (10)
124.	FC Fréthun (12)	0–2	US Landrethun-le-Nord (10)
125.	FC Setques (14)	0–1	FC Wavrans-sur-l'Aa (11)
126.	AEP St Inglevert (14)	2–1	FC Offekerque (15)
127.	Entente Calais (11)	1–2	AS Tournehem (9)
128.	US Élinghen-Ferques (13)	0–10	Calais FCHF (10)
129.	US Thérouanne (12)	0–1	AS Surques-Escœuilles (11)
130.	SO Calais (12)	3–0	US Attaquoise (11)
131.	US Rety (14)	3–1	RC Lottinghem (15)
132.	AS Bezinghem (11)	1–1 (2–3 p)	Éclair Neufchâtel-Hardelot (9)
133.	FC Wizernes (12)	2–4	US Verchocq-Ergny-Herly (11)
134.	FC Ecques-Heuringhem (11)	2–2 (4–3 p)	US Quiestède (10)
135.	FC Sangatte (10)	5–0	US Conteville Wierre-Effroy (12)
136.	AS Wimereux (10)	4–0	CAP Le Portel (11)
137.	FC La Capelle (12)	4–3	US Dannes (11)
138.	AS Alciaquoise (11)	0–3	Olympique Hesdin-Marconne (9)
139.	ADF Ruminghem (13)	1–12	FJEP Fort Vert (9)
140.	USM Boulogne-sur-Mer (13)	0–5	US Ambleteuse (11)
141.	AS Fruges (11)	3–4	Union St Loupoise (11)
142.	JS Racquinghem (12)	4–2	ES Herbelles-Pihem-Inghem (12)
143.	JS Renescuroise (12)	2–6	CS Watten (10)
144.	RC Brêmes-les-Ardres (13)	1–5	ES Licques (11)
145.	US Créquy-Planquette (11)	0–5	US Bourthes (10)
146.	US Équihen-Plage (9)	3–0	US Frencq (11)
147.	Gouy-St André RC (11)	5–3	AS Rang-du-Fliers (11)
148.	AS Maresquel (14)	6–5	AS Fillièvres (12)
149.	Amicale Pont-de-Briques (11)	3–2	RC Bréquerecque Ostrohove (11)
150.	FC Wailly-Beaucamp (13)	0–8	Verton FC (9)
151.	ES Beaurainville (10)	1–2 (a.e.t.)	AS Conchil-le-Temple (10)
152.	AS Balinghem (14)	0–8	Amicale Balzac (11)
153.	JS Condette (10)	2–1	US Marquise (10)
154.	ES Mametz (10)	1–3	ES Roquetoire (11)
155.	Entente Steenbecque-Morbecque (12)	1–3	FC Wardrecques (11)
156.	US Anizy-Pinon (13)	0–3	US Athies-sous-Laon (10)
157.	CS Aubenton (12)	1–2	ES Montcornet (9)
158.	AS Audigny (none)	0–3	Espoir Sains-Richaumont (11)
159.	US Aulnois-sous-Laon (11)	6–1	FC Hannapes (12)
160.	ES Viry-Noureuil (12)	2–0 (Note: Tie reversed with agreement of both teams.)	AS Barenton-Bugny (12)
161.	AFC Belleu (12)	– (Note: Match abandoned after 60 minutes with the scoreline 1–5. Case passed to the Disciplinary committee for investigation. Neither team qualify.)	ES Clacy-Mons (11)
162.	NES Boué-Étreux (12)	1–2	FFC Chéry-lès-Pouilly (10)
163.	US Brissy-Hamégicourt (12)	3–0	US Rozoy-sur-Serre (none)
164.	ES Bucilly-Landouzy-Éparcy (12)	1–8	FC Watigny (11)
165.	La Concorde de Bucy-les-Pierrepont (11)	1–1 (3–1 p)	US Sissonne (10)
166.	Chambry FC (13)	0–5	Entente Crouy-Cuffies (10)
167.	FC Clastrois (13)	0–10	AFC Holnon-Fayet (9)
168.	FJEP Coincy (11)	2–1	AS Milonaise (12)
169.	FC Courmelles (12)	1–2 (a.e.t.)	IEC Château-Thierry (9)
170.	US Crépy Vivaise (10)	11–2	FC Bucy-le-Long (11)
171.	Étaves-et-Bocquiaux FC (13)	1–3	US Seboncourt (11)
172.	US Étreaupont (13)	0–10	SC Origny-en-Thiérache (10)
173.	FC 3 Châteaux (10)	2–2 (3–4 p)	ES Ognes (11)
174.	Ferté Chevresis FC (12)	2–6	FC Fonsomme (11)
175.	FC Francilly-Selency (12)	3–0	FC Amigny-Rouy
176.	FC Gandelu-Dammard (13)	1–3	Septmonts OC (10)
177.	US La Fère (11)	0–1	UES Vermand (10)
178.	ASPTT Laon (11)	6–0	ASA Presles (10)
179.	Fraternelle des Cheminots de Laon (12)	1–4	CS Villeneuve St Germain (9)
180.	FC Lehaucourt (11)	4–2	FC Essigny-le-Grand (10)
181.	FC Lesdins (11)	8–1	ESUS Buironfosse-La Capelle (10)
182.	CS Montescourt-Lizerolles (12)	0–6	Gauchy-Grugies St Quentin FC (9)
183.	AS Neuilly-St Front (10)	1–1 (5–4 p)	US Venizel (10)
184.	AS Nouvionnaise (13)	1–3	Marle Sports (11)
185.	US Origny-Thenelles (12)	0–12	AS Beaurevoir (9)
186.	AS Pavant (12)	1–1 (3–4 p)	FC Vierzy (11)
187.	AS Pernant (13)	0–3	UA Fère-en-Tardenois (10)
188.	ALJN Sinceny (12)	2–5	US Prémontré St Gobain (10)
189.	ASC St Michel (11)	3–4	Le Nouvion AC (9)
190.	US des Vallées (10)	1–2	ACSF Vic-sur-Aisne (11)
191.	US Vadencourt (11)	1–7	US Vervins (9)
192.	US Vallée de l'Ailette (none)	0–3	BCV FC (9)
193.	FC Voulpaix (13)	0–7	AS Martigny (12)
194.	JS Achiet-le-Petit (15)	0–4	US Rivière (13)
195.	JS Bourecquoise (15)	1–0	US Maisnil (14)
196.	ES Ficheux (15)	10–2	AS Roclincourt (14)
197.	FC Givenchy-en-Gohelle (15)	4–1	CSAL Souchez (12)
198.	ES Ourton (14)	1–6	ES Haillicourt (14)
199.	AJ Ruitz (14)	1–5	RC Vaudricourt (14)
200.	AEP Verdrel (15)	0–2	US Ham-en-Artois (13)
201.	Avion République FC (14)	5–0	SCF Achicourt (15)
202.	ES Agny (14)	2–2 (4–3 p)	FC Méricourt (14)
203.	FC Tortequesne (14)	0–6	AS Neuvireuil-Gavrelle (13)
204.	US Boubers-Conchy (14)	1–4	ES Saulty (13)
205.	RC Locon 2000 (13)	2–1	AS Cauchy-à-la-Tour (14)
206.	RC Chocques (14)	2–3 (a.e.t.)	Entente Verquin-Béthune (13)
207.	FC Estevelles (14)	3–7	FC Dainvillois (13)
208.	US Izel-lès-Équerchin (14)	2–0	Thélus FC (14)
209.	AFC Libercourtois (14)	4–3 (a.e.t.)	AAE Dourges (12)
210.	AS Maroeuil (13)	1–9	US Mondicourt (14)
211.	FC Richebourg (14)	1–9	FC Verquigneul (13)
212.	CS Pernes (13)	2–1	AS Vendin (14)
213.	Olympique Arras (13)	0–1	AAE Aix-Noulette (11)
214.	Sud Artois (12)	3–0	SC Aubigny/Savy-Berlette Association (13)
215.	ES Bois-Bernard Acheville (12)	4–0	FC Beaumont (13)
216.	ES Éleu (13)	1–5	Stade Héninois (13)
217.	AS Auchy-les-Mines (13)	1–5	FC Hersin (12)
218.	AS Bailleul-Sir-Berthoult (13)	0–1	OC Cojeul (12)
219.	AS Berneville (13)	0–4	CS Habarcq (12)
220.	FC Busnes (13)	0–1	FC Hinges (11)
221.	US Lapugnoy (13)	1–3	FC Lillers (12)
222.	FC Hauts Lens (13)	2–5	US Grenay (11)
223.	Intrépides Norrent-Fontes(13)	3–2	US Hesdigneul (12)
224.	AS Lyssois (13)	3–2	AS Barlin (12)
225.	Olympique Vendin (13)	0–1	JF Mazingarbe (12)
226.	AS Quiéry-la-Motte (14)	1–3	Olympique Héninois (11)
227.	US Ablain (12)	0–0 (3–1 p)	US Cheminots Avion (12)
228.	AS Frévent (11)	5–0	AJ Artois (12)
229.	US Pas-en-Artois (11)	3–2	RC Avesnes-le-Comte (12)
230.	ES Allouagne (12)	4–1	AS Noyelles-lés-Vermelles (12)
231.	ES Angres (12)	1–2	AS Loison (11)
232.	US Houdain (11)	0–2	US Annezin (12)
233.	US Courcelles (11)	6–3 (a.e.t.)	FC Dynamo Carvin Fosse 4 (12)
234.	AS Courrièroise (12)	1–0	FC Annay (11)
235.	SC Fouquières (12)	0–3	USO Drocourt (10)
236.	FC La Roupie-Isbergues (12)	2–1 (a.e.t.)	FC Servins (12)
237.	AS Vallée de la Ternoise (11)	2–1	Diables Rouges Lambres-lez-Aire (12)
238.	AJ Neuville (12)	2–2 (3–4 p)	ES Vendin (11)
239.	AS Sailly-Labourse (11)	7–2	AOSC Sallaumines (12)
240.	ES Val Sensée (12)	0–1	US Ruch Carvin (11)
241.	JF Guarbecque (9)	4–0	FC Camblain-Châtelain (10)
242.	Auchel FC (10)	2–0	EC Mazingarbe (11)
243.	ASC Camblain-l'Abbé (13)	0–4	Tilloy FC (10)
244.	USA Liévin (10)	4–2	AC Noyelles-Godault (11)
245.	La Couture FC (11)	5–0	AS Lensoise (11)
246.	Olympique Liévin (10)	8–3	ES Douvrin (11)
247.	UC Divion (11)	3–1	ES Haisnes (10)
248.	Olympique Burbure (11)	0–1	ES Labeuvrière (10)
249.	AAE Évin-Malmaison (10)	1–5	AS Brebières (11)
250.	US Beuvry (11)	0–1	FC Bouvigny-Boyeffles (10)
251.	AS Bapaume-Bertincourt-Vaulx-Vraucourt (11)	0–8	ES Ste Catherine (10)
252.	Espérance Calonne Liévin (10)	5–0	US Arleux-en-Gohelle (11)
253.	AS Beaurains (10)	2–0	US Gonnehem-Busnettes (10)
254.	USO Meurchin (10)	4–1 (a.e.t.)	US Croisilles (10)
255.	AS Violaines (10)	2–1	US Noyelles-sous-Lens (9)
256.	RC Sains (12)	4–0	ES Laventie (10)
257.	US Lederzeele (12)	0–1	FC Vieux-Berquin (11)
258.	US Wervicquoise (12)	0–3	US Provin (9)
259.	ES Boeschepe (11)	2–6	OSM Sequedin (9)
260.	FC Steene (10)	4–3 (a.e.t.)	Prémesques FC (12)
261.	AS Winnezeele (13)	1–3	FC Wambrechies (10)
262.	US Houplin-Ancoisne (11)	0–4	ASC Roubaix (12)
263.	Lille Faches (12)	2–3	USF Armbouts-Cappel (11)
264.	FC Lille Sud (9)	4–1	ES Ennequin-Loos (10)
265.	AS Marcq (14)	3–0	FC St Folquin (12)
266.	AS Willems (12)	6–2	US Wallon-Cappel (12)
267.	Faches-Thumesnil FC (11)	6–1	ES Lille Louvière Pellevoisin (10)
268.	AS Radinghem (11)	1–2	US Phalempin (10)
269.	FC Seclin (8)	1–2	SCO Roubaix (8)
270.	EAC Cysoing-Wannehain-Bourghelles (10)	0–2	AS Baisieux Patro (9)
271.	AS Pont de Nieppe (12)	0–8	US Lille Moulins Carrel (8)
272.	CS Bousbecque (10)	0–2	SC Bailleulois (8)
273.	AS Dockers Dunkerque (10)	3–0	ES Wormhout (9)
274.	ACS Comines (11)	1–3	ASC Hazebrouck (8)
275.	ASF Coudekerque (12)	3–3 (1–3 p)	SC Bourbourg (10)
276.	Olympique Mérignies (12)	1–7	FC Annœullin (10)
277.	Stade Ennevelin (12)	3–0	US Fleurbaisienne (none)
278.	OJC Foot St Jans-Cappel (13)	0–3	Olympic Hallennois (14)
279.	FC Templemars-Vendeville (10)	3–2 (a.e.t.)	FC Rosendaël (9)
280.	Olympique Hémois (10)	1–2	US Ronchin (10)
281.	FA Blanc Seau (11)	0–5	Leers OF (8)
282.	SM Petite-Synthe (10)	1–4	US Wattrelos (8)
283.	OSM Lomme (9)	1–2	ES Weppes (9)
284.	AS Dunkerque Sud (8)	5–0	AJL Caëstre (10)
285.	JS Lille Wazemmes (9)	4–2	CG Haubourdin (9)
286.	Bac-Sailly Sports (12)	0–3	ASE Allennoise (11)
287.	AS Salomé (12)	3–0	JSC Ostricourt (11)
288.	AS Jean Baptiste Roubaix (12)	1–7	CS EIC Tourcoing (12)
289.	FC Lambersart (8)	2–0	FC Linselles (9)
290.	RC Bergues (10)	6–1	US Marquette (9)
291.	AS Rexpoëde (12)	0–6	FA Neuvilloise (8)
292.	JS Steenwerck (10)	2–0	JA Armentières (8)
293.	AS Bersée (10)	0–0 (5–4 p)	AO Sainghinoise (8)
294.	ES Cappelloise (12)	1–0	US Mardyck (10)
295.	SR Lomme Délivrance (11)	2–3	Toufflers AF (11)
296.	Union Halluinoise (9)	2–3	FC Madeleinois (9)
297.	FC Bierne (11)	2–4 (a.e.t.)	EC Houplines (10)
298.	FC Forestois (11)	0–1 (a.e.t.) (Note: Match to be replayed due to an error by the referee. Original scoreline 1–7.)	EC Anstaing-Chéreng-Tressin-Gruson (9)
299.	CS Erquinghem-Lys (10)	0–4	AS Albeck Grande-Synthe (10)
300.	AG Thumeries (11)	0–2	US Téteghem (10)
301.	USM Merville (12)	3–2 (a.e.t.)	AS Templeuve-en-Pévèle (9)
302.	Stella Lys (9)	4–1 (a.e.t.)	Fort-Mardyck OC (10)
303.	US Estaires (12)	4–2	CS Gondecourt (11)
304.	Football St Michel Quesnoy (10)	2–1	USCC St Pol-sur-Mer (9)
305.	US Bray-Dunes (10)	2–3	Roubaix SC (8)
306.	AS Loos Oliveaux (11)	2–3	ES Mouvalloise (8)
307.	US Warhem (10)	0–1	Flers OS (10)
308.	FC Le Doulieu (11)	3–1	FC Mons-en-Barœul (11)
309.	FC Grande-Synthe (11)	0–9	US Fretin (10)
310.	CO Quaëdypre (10)	0–5	US Leffrinckoucke (9)
311.	AAJ Uxem (11)	0–3	US Yser (9)
312.	FC Méteren (11)	1–7	ES Roncq (8)
313.	FC Nieppois (11)	1–7	FC La Chapelle-d'Armentières (9)
314.	FC Sailly-lez-Lannoy (11)	0–5	US Pérenchies (9)
315.	AS Bellignies (14)	1–5	AG Solrézienne (10)
316.	AS Preux-au-Bois (15)	3–4 (Note: US Villers-Pol penalised for fielding a suspended player. AS Preux-au-Bois qualify.)	US Villers-Pol (12)
317.	Maubeuge Olympique (12)	2–7	US Jeumont (10)
318.	Unicité FC (14)	0–3	AS La Longueville (10)
319.	Red Star Jeumont (13)	2–1	US Glageon (11)
320.	US Englefontaine (13)	6–0	JS Avesnelloise (13)
321.	Wignehies Olympique (12)	2–4 (a.e.t.)	US Viesly (11)
322.	US Beaufort/Limont-Fontaine (13)	5–0	US Prisches (13)
323.	US Sars-Poteries (14)	1–2	OC Avesnois (11)
324.	US Rousies (11)	1–3	US Gommegnies-Carnoy (11)
325.	AFC Colleret (13)	2–0	AS Dompierre (11)
326.	SA Le Quesnoy (10)	0–1	OSC Assevent (10)
327.	AS Étrœungt (13)	1–6	IC Ferrière-la-Grande (10)
328.	FC Leval (14)	0–4	Olympique Maroilles (11)
329.	AS Trélon (12)	3–2	AFC Ferrière-la-Petite (12)
330.	US Landrecies (14)	1–5	AS Obies (14)
331.	FC Sainsois (14)	2–4	SC Bachant (12)
332.	US Villers-Sire-Nicole (14)	3–4 (a.e.t.)	FC Jenlain (13)
333.	SCEPS Pont-sur-Sambre (11)	3–2	AS Recquignies (12)
334.	Maubeuge FCCA (11)	0–1	ES Boussois (10)
335.	FC Anor (14)	1–2	SC St Remy-du-Nord (12)
336.	FC Maretz (13)	2–10	AS Vendegies-Escarmain (12)
337.	US Busigny (14)	0–4	FC Cambrai-St Roch (12)
338.	AS Gouzeaucourt (14)	0–7	AO Hermies (11)
339.	FC Provillois (10)	4–0	US Fontaine-Notre-Dame (11)
340.	US Haussy (13)	0–4	FC Saulzoir (10)
341.	FC Thun-l'Évêque-Eswars (15)	0–4	FC Iwuy (11)
342.	US Rumilly (11)	3–1	Olympique St Ollois (12)
343.	SC Le Cateau (12)	5–0	SC Fontaine-au-Pire (14)
344.	FC Fontaine-au-Bois (13)	4–3	US Quiévy (12)
345.	US Bertry-Clary (12)	1–2 (a.e.t.)	FC Neuville-St Rémy (10)
346.	US Les Rues-des-Vignes (14)	0–1	AS Masnières (10)
347.	US Briastre (14)	5–0	AS Neuvilly (12)
348.	SS Marcoing (11)	2–0	FC Solesmes (11)
349.	ES Paillencourt-Estrun (10)	4–3 (Note: ES Paillencourt-Estrun penalised for fielding a suspended player. Entente Ligny/Olympique Caullery.)	Entente Ligny/Olympique Caullery (11)
350.	St Vaast FC (13)	0–3	US Walincourt-Selvigny (10)
351.	US Ors (14)	1–3	US St Souplet (10)
352.	US Bourlon-Hanyecourt-Épinoy (13)	3–4	US Beauvois Fontaine (12)
353.	FC Écaillon (14)	3–0	US Pecquencourt (11)
354.	AS Cuincy (11)	1–2 (a.e.t.)	Olympique Marquette (12)
355.	FC Bruille-lez-Marchiennes (13)	0–5	ESM Hamel (11)
356.	FC Minier Lewardois (15)	1–0	FC Pecquencourt (13)
357.	FC Nomain (13)	0–4	Olympique Flinois (10)
358.	AJP Waziers (14)	3–5	UF Anhiers (11)
359.	US Aubygeoise (13)	5–2	FC Monchecourt (13)
360.	FC Estrées (15)	0–10	FC Épinois (10)
361.	Olympic Marchiennois (12)	4–2	US Loffre-Erchin (13)
362.	FC Féchain (14)	0–1	US Hergnies (12)
363.	US Montigny-en-Ostrevent (11)	4–0	DC Lallaing (12)
364.	AS Courchelettes (11)	0–3	FC Férin (11)
365.	AS Douai-Lambres Cheminots (13)	0–4	USAC Somain (10)
366.	US Aubigny-au-Bac (13)	3–0	Dechy Sports (13)
367.	US Auberchicourt (13)	5–3	ES Bouvignies (13)
368.	US Raimbeaucourt (10)	3–0	FC Fressain-Cantin (14)
369.	AS Petite-Forêt (13)	0–1	St Waast CFC (12)
370.	US Frais Marais (11)	1–1 (5–4 p)	US Pont Flers (10)
371.	AS Coutiches (12)	2–4	US Corbehem (12)
372.	FC Roost-Warendin (11)	1–3	RC Lécluse (12)
373.	Hérin-Aubry CLE (14)	1–5	AS Thivencelle (13)
374.	ES Sebourg-Estreux (13)	2–3	USM Beuvrages (11)
375.	AFC Escautpont (11)	1–2 (a.e.t.)	FC Quarouble (9)
376.	Inter Condé (15)	3–4 (a.e.t.)	ES Crespin (11)
377.	ES Noyelles-sur-Selle (13)	3–1	SC Vicq (12)
378.	US Verchain-Maugré (14)	1–2 (Note: US Briquette penalised for fielding a suspended player. US Verchain-Maugré qualify.)	US Briquette (11)
379.	Maing FC (10)	9–3	JO Wallers-Arenberg (10)
380.	Douchy FC (11)	2–6	Anzin FARC (10)
381.	FC Condé-Macou (15)	0–3	Denain OSC (12)
382.	FC Hasnon (14)	1–3	AS Château-l'Abbaye (12)
383.	JS Haveluy (13)	5–6 (a.e.t.)	RC Rœulx (13)
384.	Neuville OSC (14)	1–11	AS Summer Club Valenciennes (10)
385.	JS Abscon (10)	0–3	St Saulve Foot (10)
386.	Stade Fresnois (10)	1–3	EA Prouvy (10)
387.	FC St Python (14)	4–2	SC Lourches (11)
388.	AS Curgies (12)	3–0	Olympique Landasien (11)
389.	CO Trith-St Léger (11)	6–4 (a.e.t.)	Olympique Onnaingeois (10)
390.	FC Famars (11)	1–4	FC Lecelles-Rosult (10)
391.	AS Artres (13)	5–1 (Note: AS Artres penalised for fielding a suspended player. AS Wavrechain-sous-Denain qualify.)	AS Wavrechain-sous-Denain (12)
392.	Olympique Millonfossois (14)	3–2	US Haulchin (13)
393.	FC Saultain (12)	20–0	US Lieu-St Amand (13)
394.	ES Bouchain (11)	2–1	Vieux Condé (10)

=== Second round ===
These matches were played on 1 September 2019, with two matches waiting for delayed first round results to be played on 8 September 2019.

Second round results: Hauts-de-France
Tie no	Home team (tier)	Score	Away team (tier)
1.	AS Cucq (9)	0–0 (1–3 p)	AS Étaples (7)
2.	US Rety (14)	0–4	ES Guînes (9)
3.	FCP Blendecques (9)	1–3	ES Enquin-les-Mines (8)
4.	AEP St Inglevert (14)	0–4	AS Audruicq (9)
5.	Gouy-St André RC (11)	1–8	US Montreuil (9)
6.	AS Maresquel (14)	2–8	AF Étaples Haute Ville (10)
7.	US Verchocq-Ergny-Herly (11)	1–3	ES Licques (11)
8.	Calais FCHF (10)	3–0	CA Éperlecques (9)
9.	US Bourthes (10)	0–4	Olympique Lumbrois (7)
10.	US Landrethun-le-Nord (10)	0–5	Grand Calais Pascal FC (7)
11.	ES St Omer Rural (10)	4–1	JS Desvroise (9)
12.	CS Watten (10)	1–0 (a.e.t.)	RC Ardrésien (10)
13.	JS Racquinghem (12)	1–0	FC Wardrecques (11)
14.	FC Wavrans-sur-l'Aa (11)	0–2	US Blaringhem (9)
15.	SO Calais (12)	2–4	ESL Boulogne-sur-Mer (10)
16.	ES Roquetoire (11)	0–4	ES Arques (8)
17.	AS Nortkerque 95 (8)	1–0	Recques FC (9)
18.	Union St Loupoise (11)	4–6 (a.e.t.)	FC Merlimont (10)
19.	AS Tournehem (9)	1–2	FC Tatinghem (8)
20.	CO Wimille (9)	0–6	Olympique St Martin Boulogne (8)
21.	AS Wimereux (10)	0–3	US Blériot-Plage (7)
22.	AS Surques-Escœuilles (11)	0–1 (a.e.t.)	US Ambleteuse (11)
23.	AS Crémarest (12)	1–3	US Équihen-Plage (9)
24.	US Nielles-lès-Bléquin (9)	1–3	JS Longuenesse (8)
25.	AC Tubersent (13)	0–6	Verton FC (9)
26.	US Dohem-Avroult-Cléty (11)	0–1 (a.e.t.)	FC Ecques-Heuringhem (11)
27.	JS Condette (10)	0–5	FC Campagne-lès-Guines (9)
28.	AS St Tricat et Nielles (13)	1–2	FC La Capelle (12)
29.	JS Blangy-sur-Ternoise (13)	0–13	Olympique Hesdin-Marconne (9)
30.	Amicale Balzac (11)	0–3	ES Calaisis Coulogne (8)
31.	US Marais de Gûines (11)	6–1	ASL Vieil-Moutier La Calique (12)
32.	Amicale Pont-de-Briques (11)	4–0	US Alquines (11)
33.	AS Campagne-lès-Hesdin (10)	0–1	US Attin (9)
34.	ES Oye-Plage (9)	0–4 (Note: Calais Beau-Marais penalised for fielding a suspended player. ES Oye-Plage qualify.)	Calais Beau-Marais (8)
35.	Le Portel GPF (13)	1–2	Éclair Neufchâtel-Hardelot (9)
36.	AS Colembert (12)	2–2 (2–4 p)	FLC Longfossé (10)
37.	US Coyecques (13)	2–1	US St Quentin-Bléssy (9)
38.	AS Conchil-le-Temple (10)	0–2	AS Berck (9)
39.	FC Calais Caténa (10)	1–5	SC Coquelles (8)
40.	ES St Léonard (9)	2–1	FC Sangatte (10)
41.	AS Calais (13)	0–2	FJEP Fort Vert (9)
42.	US Brissy-Hamégicourt (12)	1–5	Tergnier FC (8)
43.	La Concorde de Bucy-les-Pierrepont (11)	1–3	US Buire-Hirson-Thiérache (8)
44.	FFC Chéry-lès-Pouilly (10)	0–1	US Aulnois-sous-Laon (11)
45.	Entente Crouy-Cuffies (10)	1–0	IEC Château-Thierry (9)
46.	UA Fère-en-Tardenois (10)	4–0	FJEP Coincy (11)
47.	FC Francilly-Selency (12)	0–4	UES Vermand (10)
48.	FC Fonsomme (11)	0–4	AS Beaurevoir (9)
49.	Gauchy-Grugies St Quentin FC (9)	2–0	FC Soissons (7)
50.	Harly Quentin (9)	1–0	US Vervins (9)
51.	AFC Holnon-Fayet (9)	1–3	L'Arsenal Club Achery-Beautor-Charmes (8)
52.	ASPTT Laon (11)	1–2	BCV FC (9)
53.	FC Lehaucourt (11)	2–0	US Guise (9)
54.	FC Lesdins (11)	4–3	SAS Moy de l'Aisne (8)
55.	AS Martigny (12)	1–2	Le Nouvion AC (9)
56.	FC Moncelien (10)	2–1	Stade Portugais St Quentin (8)
57.	ES Montcornet (9)	4–2 (a.e.t.)	RC Bohain (8)
58.	AS Neuilly-St Front (10)	1–2	Château Thierry-Etampes FC (7)
59.	ES Ognes (11)	1–2	US Bruyères-et-Montbérault (8)
60.	US Prémontré St Gobain (10)	2–2 (2–3 p)	US Athies-sous-Laon (10)
61.	Espoir Sains-Richaumont (11)	1–3	ICS Créçois (8)
62.	US Seboncourt (11)	3–1	SC Origny-en-Thiérache (10)
63.	Septmonts OC (10)	2–1 (a.e.t.)	Union Sud Aisne FC (7)
64.	ACSF Vic-sur-Aisne (11)	0–12	Internationale Soissonnaise (7)
65.	FC Vierzy (11)	0–6	CS Villeneuve St Germain (9)
66.	ES Viry-Noureuil (12)	0–3	US Crépy Vivaise (10)
67.	FC Watigny (11)	1–3	US Ribemont Mezieres FC (8)
68.	FC Vieux-Berquin (11)	0–2	OC Roubaisien (8)
69.	US Provin (9)	5–3	US Ronchin (10)
70.	SCO Roubaix (8)	2–0	FC Bondues (7)
71.	OSM Sequedin (9)	0–3	US Wattrelos (8)
72.	FC Steene (10)	1–2	FC Wattignies (10)
73.	FC Wambrechies (10)	2–3	ACS Hoymille (9)
74.	ASC Roubaix (12)	5–5 (5–4 p)	Football St Michel Quesnoy (10)
75.	USF Armbouts-Cappel (11)	5–2	AS Salomé (12)
76.	ASC Hazebrouck (8)	1–1 (3–5 p)	FC Lille Sud (9)
77.	AS Marcq (14)	1–4	Faches-Thumesnil FC (11)
78.	AS Willems (12)	0–2	ES Genech (10)
79.	US Phalempin (10)	1–2 (a.e.t.)	JS Steenwerck (10)
80.	AS Baisieux Patro (9)	1–3	Mons AC (8)
81.	FC La Chapelle-d'Armentières (9)	3–1	US Lille Moulins Carrel (8)
82.	US Godewaersvelde (12)	0–4	SC Bailleulois (8)
83.	AS Dockers Dunkerque (10)	0–5	FC Santes (7)
84.	SC Bourbourg (10)	0–6	US Pays de Cassel (7)
85.	FC Annœullin (10)	1–0	AS Albeck Grande-Synthe (10)
86.	Stade Ennevelin (12)	0–8	Leers OF (8)
87.	Olympic Hallennois (14)	0–2	US Pérenchies (9)
88.	Stade Lezennois (9)	1–1 (9–8 p)	FC Templemars-Vendeville (10)
89.	ES Weppes (9)	3–1	ES Mouvalloise (8)
90.	FA Neuvilloise (8)	4–0	AS Dunkerque Sud (8)
91.	AS Bersée (10)	1–2	JS Lille Wazemmes (9)
92.	ASE Allennoise (11)	0–8	US Esquelbecq (7)
93.	CS EIC Tourcoing (12)	1–3	Verlinghem Foot (9)
94.	FC Deûlémont (11)	0–2	FC Lambersart (8)
95.	US Estaires (12)	1–2	RC Bergues (10)
96.	ES Cappelloise (12)	1–2	JS Ghyveldoise (10)
97.	Toufflers AF (11)	1–4	Villeneuve-d'Ascq Métropole (8)
98.	JS Wavrin-Don (9)	0–0 (2–3 p)	FC Madeleinois (9)
99.	EC Houplines (10)	0–5	US Portugais Roubaix Tourcoing (7)
100.	US Téteghem (10)	1–0 (a.e.t.)	ES Roncq (8)
101.	USM Merville (12)	1–3	Roubaix SC (8)
102.	AS Hellemmes (8)	2–3 (a.e.t.)	Stella Lys (9)
103.	Flers OS (10)	2–2 (4–5 p)	FC Le Doulieu (11)
104.	US Fretin (10)	0–4	OS Fives (7)
105.	US Leffrinckoucke (9)	2–3 (a.e.t.)	AS Steenvorde (7)
106.	EC Camphin-en-Pévèle (12)	0–4	US Yser (9)
107.	Wattrelos FC (10)	0–1	US St André (7)
108.	US Ascq (7)	1–0	IC Lambersart (7)
109.	FC Craywick (12)	1–3	CS La Gorgue (7)
110.	US Sailly-Saillisel (11)	2–1 (a.e.t.)	US Lignières-Châtelain (10)
111.	ASM Rivery (13)	0–1	AS Cerisy (12)
112.	ES Licourt (12)	0–1	SC Moreuil (8)
113.	ABC2F Candas (12)	2–1	US Ouvriere Albert (9)
114.	FC Méaulte (10)	3–2 (a.e.t.)	US Flesselles (11)
115.	AS Villers-Bretonneux (9)	0–1 (a.e.t.)	Montdidier AC (8)
116.	AAE Bray-sur-Somme (13)	0–4	AF Amiens (13)
117.	FC Plessier (12)	1–2	Olympique Le Hamel (10)
118.	ES Roye-Damery (11)	0–5	FC Ailly-sur-Somme Samara (7)
119.	Fraternelle Ailly-sur-Noye (11)	2–3	Entente CAFC Péronne (7)
120.	ASFR Ribemont Mericourt (12)	1–10	US Rosières (10)
121.	ES Sains/St Fuscien (10	0–4	US Daours Vecquemont Bussy Aubigny (11)
122.	Conty Lœuilly SC (9)	3–7	AS du Pays Neslois (7)
123.	US Cartigny-Buire (12)	3–3 (3–4 p)	Amiens Picardie FC (11)
124.	AS Glisy (10)	0–1 (a.e.t.)	FC La Montoye (8)
125.	AS Querrieu (11)	0–2	CS Amiens Montières Étouvie (8)
126.	ES Vers-sur-Selle (13)	1–4	RC Amiens (8)
127.	ES Pigeonnier Amiens (9)	9–0	AAE Chaulnes (8)
128.	AS St Sauveur 80 (11)	3–4	JS Quevauvillers (9)
129.	AC Hallencourt (11)	0–2 (a.e.t.)	SC Pont-Remy (10)
130.	CS Crécy-en-Ponthieu (10)	2–3	FC Centuloise (8)
131.	Avenir Croisien (13)	1–6	US Abbeville (9)
132.	US Bouillancourt-en-Sery (13)	1–3	JS Cambron (12)
133.	Avenir Nouvion-en-Ponthieu (12)	0–2	SC Abbeville (7)
134.	US Béthencourt-sur-Mer (11)	4–0	SEP Blangy-Bouttencourt (11)
135.	SC Templiers Oisemont (11)	2–0	ES Chépy (12)
136.	AS Picquigny (13)	3–2	FC Oisemont (10)
137.	Association Longpré-Long-Condé (13)	1–4	Amiens RIF (9)
138.	Olympique Eaucourtois (12)	0–6	SC Flixecourt (9)
139.	Auxiloise (10)	1–3	US Friville-Escarbotin (8)
140.	AS Gamaches (7)	5–2	FC Porto Portugais Amiens (7)
141.	Poix-Blangy-Croixrault FC (10)	0–1	FC St Valéry Baie de Somme Sud (9)
142.	AC Mers (11)	0–1	RC Doullens (8)
143.	AAE Feuquières-en-Vimeu (14)	0–11	ES Harondel (10)
144.	ASIC Bouttencourt (12)	1–2	JS Miannay-Moyenneville-Lambercourt (8)
145.	OSC Assevent (10)	0–2	FC Avesnes-sur-Helpe (8)
146.	AS La Longueville (10)	1–4	US Cousolre (9)
147.	US Gommegnies-Carnoy (11)	2–2 (2–4 p)	SCEPS Pont-sur-Sambre (11)
148.	US Fourmies (8)	5–2	US Bavay (8)
149.	AS Trélon (12)	1–4	ES Boussois (10)
150.	OC Avesnois (11)	1–3	AG Solrézienne (10)
151.	US Englefontaine (13)	0–1 (a.e.t.)	IC Ferrière-la-Grande (10)
152.	FC Jenlain (13)	– (Note: FC Epinette-Maubeuge penalised for fielding an ineligible player. FC Jenlain qualify.)	FC Epinette-Maubeuge (9)
153.	AS Obies (14)	0–5	FC Marpent (7)
154.	Red Star Jeumont (13)	0–6	US Berlaimont (9)
155.	SC St Remy-du-Nord (12)	0–2	AS Douzies (8)
156.	SC Bachant (12)	1–3	AS Hautmont (8)
157.	ASG Louvroil (9)	2–0	US Jeumont (10)
158.	US Viesly (11)	0–3	Sports Podéens Réunis (9)
159.	US Beaufort/Limont-Fontaine (13)	5–0	AFC Colleret (13)
160.	OM Cambrai Amérique (9)	2–0	FC Neuville-St Rémy (10)
161.	US St Aubert (9)	1–0	US St Souplet (10)
162.	AS Vendegies-Escarmain (12)	2–4 (a.e.t.)	ES Caudry (9)
163.	US Walincourt-Selvigny (10)	6–0	US Rumilly (11)
164.	US Briastre (14)	1–3	FC Saulzoir (10)
165.	SC Le Cateau (12)	3–5 (a.e.t.)	FC Provillois (10)
166.	AS Masnières (10)	0–2	CAS Escaudœuvres (7)
167.	FC Cambrai-St Roch (12)	0–2	ES Villers-Outréaux (8)
168.	FC Fontaine-au-Bois (13)	1–4	AO Hermies (11)
169.	FC Iwuy (11)	2–0	SS Marcoing (11)
170.	US Montigny-en-Ostrevent (11)	3–2 (a.e.t.)	SC Aniche (8)
171.	ESM Hamel (11)	3–1	SC Douai (8)
172.	US Frais Marais (11)	4–0	Olympic Marchiennois (12)
173.	SC Guesnain (8)	8–1	Olympique Senséen (9)
174.	US Corbehem (12)	2–3	US Aubigny-au-Bac (13)
175.	FC Épinois (10)	0–3	US Mineurs Waziers (7)
176.	FC Férin (11)	0–4	Olympique Flinois (10)
177.	St Waast CFC (12)	0–2	Stade Orchésien (9)
178.	US Auberchicourt (13)	3–1	FC Masny (9)
179.	FC Écaillon (14)	1–9	USAC Somain (10)
180.	FC Minier Lewardois (15)	0–6	AS Beuvry-la-Forêt (8)
181.	RC Lécluse (12)	0–9	US Erre-Hornaing (9)
182.	US Raimbeaucourt (10)	1–4	ES Lambresienne (7)
183.	Olympique Marquette (12)	0–9	AEF Leforest (8)
184.	UF Anhiers (11)	0–1	AS Sin-le-Noble (7)
185.	US Aubygeoise (13)	5–4 (a.e.t.) (Note: Tie reversed with agreement of both teams.)	US Hergnies (12)
186.	FC St Python (14)	0–6	US Aulnoy (9)
187.	Maing FC (10)	1–1 (5–6 p)	US Hordain (8)
188.	ES Bouchain (11)	1–2	St Saulve Foot (10)
189.	USM Marly (9)	1–0	Bruay Sports (9)
190.	FC Lecelles-Rosult (10)	3–0	ES Crespin (11)
191.	AS Curgies (12)	0–3	AS Summer Club Valenciennes (10)
192.	Denain OSC (12)	2–1	USM Beuvrages (11)
193.	AS Thivencelle (13)	1–0	CO Trith-St Léger (11)
194.	ES Noyelles-sur-Selle (13)	0–8	US Escaudain (7)
195.	Anzin FARC (10)	0–3	IC La Sentinelle (7)
196.	Olympique Millonfossois (14)	1–5	FC Raismes (8)
197.	AS Château-l'Abbaye (12)	1–2	FC Quarouble (9)
198.	RC Rœulx (13)	1–2 (a.e.t.)	EA Prouvy (10)
199.	JS Écourt-St Quentin (8)	2–3	US Biachoise (7)
200.	ES Ste Catherine (10)	2–1	US Vermelles (7)
201.	ES Anzin-St Aubin (9)	1–3	AS Ste Barbe-Oignies (7)
202.	US Mondicourt (14)	0–0 (2–3 p)	US Rivière (13)
203.	US Grenay (11)	3–2 (a.e.t.)	ESD Isbergues (8)
204.	AAE Aix-Noulette (11)	1–3	AFCL Liebaut (8)
205.	US Billy-Berclau (9)	3–2 (a.e.t.)	Carabiniers Billy-Montigny (8)
206.	US St Pol-sur-Ternoise (8)	3–1	OS Annequin (9)
207.	CS Diana Liévin (8)	3–1	USO Lens (9)
208.	US Lestrem (9)	1–4	USO Bruay-la-Buissière (8)
209.	FC Bouvigny-Boyeffles (10)	1–7	ES Bully-les-Mines (8)
210.	SC St Nicolas-lez-Arras (8)	2–1 (a.e.t.)	FC Montigny-en-Gohelle (9)
211.	FC Hinges (11)	0–1 (a.e.t.)	Auchel FC (10)
212.	RC Labourse (9)	2–0	ES St Laurent-Blangy (10)
213.	COS Marles-Lozinghem (9)	2–1	USA Liévin (10)
214.	Calonne-Ricouart FC Cite 6 (9)	1–2	AS Beaurains (10)
215.	SC Artésien (9)	1–0	Espérance Calonne Liévin (10)
216.	La Couture FC (11)	2–6	SC Pro Patria Wingles (9)
217.	US Rouvroy (9)	3–1	Olympique Liévin (10)
218.	ES Labeuvrière (10)	0–3	JF Guarbecque (9)
219.	AS Brebières (11)	2–1	UAS Harnes (9)
220.	AS Tincquizel (10)	0–2	AS Frévent (11)
221.	Tilloy FC (10)	3–1	US Courcelles (11)
222.	Olympique Héninois (11)	3–4	USO Drocourt (10)
223.	ES Allouagne (12)	– (Note: Match stopped with the scoreline 1–5. ES Allougane penalised. AS Violaines qualify.)	AS Violaines (10)
224.	FC Hersin (12)	0–3	USO Meurchin (10)
225.	FC Verquigneul (13)	2–3	UC Divion (11)
226.	RC Vaudricourt (14)	3–1 (a.e.t.)	Intrépides Norrent-Fontes(13)
227.	FC Dainvillois (13)	1–2	US Pas-en-Artois (11)
228.	US Ruch Carvin (11)	1–0	Sud Artois (12)
229.	ES Ficheux (15)	3–1	US Izel-lès-Équerchin (14)
230.	FC Givenchy-en-Gohelle (15)	0–1	RC Locon 2000 (13)
231.	ES Agny (14)	1–0	US Ablain (12)
232.	US Annezin (12)	5–2	AS Courrièroise (12)
233.	Entente Verquin-Béthune (13)	0–1	RC Sains (12)
234.	ES Haillicourt (14)	2–1	AS Lyssois (13)
235.	US Ham-en-Artois (13)	1–1 (5–4 p)	JF Mazingarbe (12)
236.	Stade Héninois (13)	5–0	ES Bois-Bernard Acheville (12)
237.	AS Neuvireuil-Gavrelle (13)	5–1	AFC Libercourtois (14)
238.	ES Saulty (13)	0–1 (a.e.t.)	Avion République FC (14)
239.	OC Cojeul (12)	0–3	AG Grenay (9)
240.	FC Lillers (12)	2–0	AS Vallée de la Ternoise (11)
241.	JS Bourecquoise (15)	3–2	CS Pernes (13)
242.	AS Loison (11)	1–3 (Note: Match replayed due to refereeing error.)	US Monchy-au-Bois (10)
243.	ES Vendin (11)	3–3 (0–3 p)	AS Sailly-Labourse (11)
244.	CS Habarcq (12)	1–2 (a.e.t.)	FC La Roupie-Isbergues (12)
245.	AS Laigneville (12)	0–1	US Chevrières-Grandfresnoy (8)
246.	FC Fontainettes St Aubin (11)	2–1	OC Bury (12)
247.	AS Noyers-Saint-Martin (12)	2–3	US Bresloise (9)
248.	AS Montchrevreuil (10)	0–5	US Gouvieux (8)
249.	JS Bulles (11)	0–2	Standard FC Montataire (8)
250.	AS Laversines (12)	0–1	AJ Laboissière-en-Thelle (10)
251.	AS Ons-en-Bray (11)	2–1	AS Coye-la-Forêt (12)
252.	FC Liancourt-Clermont (8)	3–1	US Choisy-au-Bac (7)
253.	EFC Dieudonné Puiseux (11)	5–4	AS Verneuil-en-Halatte (9)
254.	ES Compiègne (11)	3–0 (a.e.t.)	US Estrées-St Denis (8)
255.	JS Thieux (12)	0–8	Stade Ressontois (9)
256.	Canly FC (10)	1–2	USE St Leu d'Esserent (9)
257.	AS Multien (10)	3–0	AS Allonne (9)
258.	US Baugy Monchy Humières (11)	1–3	US Meru Sandricourt (8)
259.	AS St Sauveur (Oise) (9)	4–0	US Étouy (9)
260.	AS Maignelay-Montigny (12)	1–0	ESC Wavignies (10)
261.	AS Tracy-le-Mont (11)	0–5	US St Maximin (7)
262.	US Cires-lès-Mello (9)	0–1	CS Chaumont-en-Vexin (7)
263.	US Crèvecœur-le-Grand (11)	1–3	US Villers-St Paul (9)
264.	AS Auneuil (10)	0–4	US Breuil-le-Sec (11)
265.	Grandvilliers AC (9)	2–1	Hermes-Berthecourt AC (10)
266.	AS Rochy-Condé (11)	3–2	AS Bornel (11)
267.	ES Formerie (11)	2–1 (a.e.t.)	ASPTT Beauvais (10)
268.	AS Verderel-lès-Sauqueuse (11)	1–3	US Balagny-St Epin (7)
269.	US Ribécourt (9)	1–3	AFC Creil (8)
270.	CS Haudivillers (11)	2–1	US Ste Geneviève (11)
271.	US Verberie (12)	0–3	US Plessis-Brion (9)
272.	CA Venette (10)	0–3	US Breteuil (7)
273.	US Lieuvillers (11)	1–1 (4–2 p)	US Lassigny (9)
274.	US Margny-lès-Compiègne (8)	3–1	ES Valois Multien (7)
275.	FC Sacy-St Martin (12)	0–3	FC Longueil-Annel (8)
276.	AS Mareuil-sur-Ourcq (12)	0–3	FC Béthisy (9)
277.	CS Avilly-St Léonard (9)	1–0	ES Ormoy-Duvy (10)
278.	AS Montmacq (12)	0–5	JSA Compiègne-La Croix-St Ouen (10)
279.	FC Golancourt (13)	0–3	FC Ruraville (12)
280.	US Marseille-en-Beauvaisis (10)	0–1	US Pont Ste-Maxence (7)
281.	US Lamorlaye (9)	0–1	SC St Just-en-Chaussée (8)
282.	Entente Ligny/Olympique Caullery (11)	6–1	US Beauvois Fontaine (12)
283.	US Verchain-Maugré (14)	1–6	Dutemple FC Valenciennes (9)
284.	AS Preux-au-Bois (15)	1–6	Olympique Maroilles (11)
285.	FC Saultain (12)	4–1	AS Wavrechain-sous-Denain (12)
286.	winner tie 161	void (Note: Void due to no team qualifying from the first round tie. Marle Sports given bye.)	Marle Sports (11)
287.	EC Anstaing-Chéreng-Tressin-Gruson (9)	0–4	FC Dunkerque-Malo Plage (7)

=== Third round ===
These matches were played on 14 and 15 September 2019, with one replayed on 6 October 2019.

Third round results: Hauts-de-France
Tie no	Home team (tier)	Score	Away team (tier)
1.	USF Armbouts-Cappel (11)	0–8	Olympique Grande-Synthe (5)
2.	JS Bourecquoise (15)	0–2	JS Ghyveldoise (10)
3.	RC Bergues (10)	4–1	ES Licques (11)
4.	JS Longuenesse (8)	5–1	COS Marles-Lozinghem (9)
5.	SC Bailleulois (8)	1–3	AS Steenvorde (7)
6.	UC Divion (11)	0–4	US Gravelines (6)
7.	FC Lillers (12)	3–1	US Grenay (11)
8.	US Téteghem (10)	0–0 (2–4 p)	USO Bruay-la-Buissière (8)
9.	ES Arques (8)	2–3	AS Marck (6)
10.	Olympique Hesdin-Marconne (9)	4–5 (a.e.t.)	Grand Calais Pascal FC (7)
11.	US Esquelbecq (7)	2–0	FC Loon-Plage (6)
12.	RC Sains (12)	2–6	US Attin (9)
13.	FC Dunkerque-Malo Plage (7)	5–0	ES Calaisis Coulogne (8)
14.	US Marais de Gûines (11)	4–6	ACS Hoymille (9)
15.	RC Labourse (9)	6–2	ES St Léonard (9)
16.	FC Campagne-lès-Guines (9)	2–3 (a.e.t.) (Note: Tie reversed from original draw.)	US Yser (9)
17.	FC La Capelle (12)	0–6	US Blériot-Plage (7)
18.	ES Ficheux (15)	0–5	OC Roubaisien (8)
19.	AS Outreau (6)	2–4 (a.e.t.)	US Pays de Cassel (7)
20.	RC Locon 2000 (13)	0–8	US Saint-Omer (6)
21.	AS Beaurains (10)	5–0	ES Oye-Plage (9)
22.	FC La Roupie-Isbergues (12)	0–3	AS Gamaches (7)
23.	FLC Longfossé (10)	1–3	Olympique Lumbrois (7)
24.	USO Drocourt (10)	5–3	US Montreuil (9)
25.	Éclair Neufchâtel-Hardelot (9)	5–1	SC Flixecourt (9)
26.	AS Sailly-Labourse (11)	3–2	US Friville-Escarbotin (8)
27.	Auchel FC (10)	0–1	Stade Portelois (5)
28.	ASC Roubaix (12)	3–1	US Équihen-Plage (9)
29.	SC Coquelles (8)	2–1	ES Enquin-les-Mines (8)
30.	ES Guînes (9)	0–3	AS Nortkerque 95 (8)
31.	AG Grenay (9)	0–2	Tilloy FC (10)
32.	ES Agny (14)	1–8	US Wattrelos (8)
33.	US Ham-en-Artois (13)	1–5	AS Violaines (10)
34.	JS Steenwerck (10)	2–1	Amicale Pont-de-Briques (11)
35.	US Ambleteuse (11)	2–5 (a.e.t.)	JS Miannay-Moyenneville-Lambercourt (8)
36.	ES Weppes (9)	1–0	AS St Sauveur (Oise) (9)
37.	USO Meurchin (10)	5–3 (a.e.t.)	US Biachoise (7)
38.	FC Wattignies (10)	3–0	SC Templiers Oisemont (11)
39.	FC Centuloise (8)	0–2	OS Aire-sur-la-Lys (6)
40.	SC Pont-Remy (10)	0–4	SC Hazebrouck (6)
41.	JF Guarbecque (9)	0–1	CS La Gorgue (7)
42.	JS Cambron (12)	1–2	FC Lille Sud (9)
43.	US Annezin (12)	0–3	AS Étaples (7)
44.	US Rouvroy (9)	3–0	JS Racquinghem (12)
45.	Olympique St Martin Boulogne (8)	0–1	Le Touquet AC (5)
46.	Avion République FC (14)	0–3	SC Abbeville (7)
47.	ES Bully-les-Mines (8)	2–1 (a.e.t.)	FC Tatinghem (8)
48.	US Béthencourt-sur-Mer (11)	4–1	FC St Valéry Baie de Somme Sud (9)
49.	SCO Roubaix (8)	3–1 (Note: The original match finished 1–0. FC La Chapelle-d'Armentières registered a claim that the referee had made an error in allowing a substituted player to re-enter the field. The claim was deemed to have been entered too late by the League committee. However, FC La Chapelle-d'Armentieres appealed, and the League Appeals committee ruled the match should be replayed on 6 October 2019.)	FC La Chapelle-d'Armentières (9)
50.	US Sailly-Saillisel (11)	2–2 (8–7 p)	SC Pro Patria Wingles (9)
51.	ES Ste Catherine (10)	2–5	CS Avion (6)
52.	RC Doullens (8)	1–3	FA Neuvilloise (8)
53.	RC Vaudricourt (14)	1–0	CS Watten (10)
54.	ES Haillicourt (14)	0–2	US Ascq (7)
55.	AS Frévent (11)	0–4	US St André (7)
56.	US Monchy-au-Bois (10)	4–1	Stade Lezennois (9)
57.	ES Genech (10)	2–0	ES St Omer Rural (10)
58.	FC Ecques-Heuringhem (11)	0–3	US Billy-Berclau (9)
59.	ABC2F Candas (12)	1–3	Stella Lys (9)
60.	FC Annœullin (10)	4–1	FC La Montoye (8)
61.	Villeneuve-d'Ascq Métropole (8)	3–4	US St Pol-sur-Ternoise (8)
62.	US Portugais Roubaix Tourcoing (7)	2–1	Arras FA (5)
63.	SC Artésien (9)	1–3	Wasquehal Football (6)
64.	US Blaringhem (9)	0–6	US Nœux-les-Mines (6)
65.	US St Quentin-Bléssy (9)	3–1	RC Amiens (8)
66.	Faches-Thumesnil FC (11)	2–1 (a.e.t.)	FC Le Doulieu (11)
67.	Stade Héninois (13)	2–4	Leers OF (8)
68.	US Rivière (13)	1–2	US Erre-Hornaing (9)
69.	US Lesquin (6)	0–1	Olympique Marcquois Football (5)
70.	FC Raismes (8)	3–1	ES Lambresienne (7)
71.	US Pérenchies (9)	2–2 (4–2 p)	SC St Nicolas-lez-Arras (8)
72.	OS Fives (7)	3–2	Saint-Amand FC (6)
73.	AS Neuvireuil-Gavrelle (13)	0–1	FC Madeleinois (9)
74.	AS Audruicq (9)	1–3	US Tourcoing FC (6)
75.	St Saulve Foot (10)	3–2 (a.e.t.)	Verlinghem Foot (9)
76.	AS Summer Club Valenciennes (10)	0–1	Calais FCHF (10)
77.	ESL Boulogne-sur-Mer (10)	3–1	FC Santes (7)
78.	AS Brebières (11)	1–5	FC Lambersart (8)
79.	Mons AC (8)	2–1	AFCL Liebaut (8)
80.	FJEP Fort Vert (9)	0–3	Olympique Flinois (10)
81.	JS Lille Wazemmes (9)	2–1	US Provin (9)
82.	Entente Ligny/Olympique Caullery (11)	0–1 (a.e.t.)	US Ruch Carvin (11)
83.	AEF Leforest (8)	2–0	Dutemple FC Valenciennes (9)
84.	AO Hermies (11)	0–3	Roubaix SC (8)
85.	IC La Sentinelle (7)	4–4 (4–5 p)	SC Guesnain (8)
86.	Denain OSC (12)	1–2 (a.e.t.)	USAC Somain (10)
87.	Stade Orchésien (9)	4–0	EA Prouvy (10)
88.	US Aubigny-au-Bac (13)	1–3	AS Sin-le-Noble (7)
89.	US Hordain (8)	2–5	AS Beuvry-la-Forêt (8)
90.	AS Ste Barbe-Oignies (7)	1–0 (a.e.t.)	CS Diana Liévin (8)
91.	US Aulnoy (9)	1–2	FC Provillois (10)
92.	USM Marly (9)	0–2	Stade Béthunois (6)
93.	US Aubygeoise (13)	2–4	US Montigny-en-Ostrevent (11)
94.	US Auberchicourt (13)	2–1	US Berlaimont (9)
95.	FC Saulzoir (10)	1–6	US Vimy (5)
96.	US St Aubert (9)	1–4	ESC Longueau (6)
97.	US Frais Marais (11)	0–4	US St Maurice Loos-en-Gohelle (6)
98.	FC Lecelles-Rosult (10)	2–0	US Mineurs Waziers (7)
99.	FC Iwuy (11)	2–2 (4–2 p)	Sports Podéens Réunis (9)
100.	AS Thivencelle (13)	0–3	Tergnier FC (8)
101.	Le Nouvion AC (9)	0–7	Feignies Aulnoye FC (5)
102.	AG Solrézienne (10)	4–2 (a.e.t.)	US Crépy Vivaise (10)
103.	US Cousolre (9)	1–0	US Escaudain (7)
104.	SCEPS Pont-sur-Sambre (11)	4–10	OM Cambrai Amérique (9)
105.	ES Montcornet (9)	4–1	US Athies-sous-Laon (10)
106.	US Ribemont Mezieres FC (8)	4–0	FC Lesdins (11)
107.	L'Arsenal Club Achery-Beautor-Charmes (8)	2–1	US Roye-Noyon (6)
108.	Olympique Maroilles (11)	3–0	AS Beaurevoir (9)
109.	FC Saultain (12)	3–1	Entente CAFC Péronne (7)
110.	ES Villers-Outréaux (8)	1–1 (2–4 p)	US Fourmies (8)
111.	Entente Itancourt-Neuville (6)	1–3	AC Cambrai (6)
112.	ESM Hamel (11)	0–2	CAS Escaudœuvres (7)
113.	AS Hautmont (8)	3–0	ES Caudry (9)
114.	US Walincourt-Selvigny (10)	1–2 (a.e.t.)	US Buire-Hirson-Thiérache (8)
115.	Stade Ressontois (9)	2–0	FC Quarouble (9)
116.	Entente Crouy-Cuffies (10)	0–1	US Bruyères-et-Montbérault (8)
117.	US Aulnois-sous-Laon (11)	0–1 (a.e.t.)	AFC Creil (8)
118.	Marle Sports (11)	1–5	US Chauny (6)
119.	ES Boussois (10)	3–2	ICS Créçois (8)
120.	Septmonts OC (10)	1–7	AS Douzies (8)
121.	US Guignicourt (6)	1–2	US Pont Ste-Maxence (7)
122.	AS Cerisy (12)	1–10	US Maubeuge (5)
123.	US Seboncourt (11)	3–6	ASG Louvroil (9)
124.	US Plessis-Brion (9)	3–0	FC Moncelien (10)
125.	FC Jenlain (13)	0–5	FC Avesnes-sur-Helpe (8)
126.	FC Béthisy (9)	1–6	FC Marpent (7)
127.	BCV FC (9)	3–1	US Beaufort/Limont-Fontaine (13)
128.	FC Lehaucourt (11)	2–1	Gauchy-Grugies St Quentin FC (9)
129.	IC Ferrière-la-Grande (10)	0–0 (3–5 p)	US Chevrières-Grandfresnoy (8)
130.	US Laon (6)	4–0	Internationale Soissonnaise (7)
131.	Montdidier AC (8)	0–6	US Camon (6)
132.	FC Merlimont (10)	0–2	ES Pigeonnier Amiens (9)
133.	US Breuil-le-Sec (11)	2–2 (1–3 p)	CS Amiens Montières Étouvie (8)
134.	AS Multien (10)	1–2	Standard FC Montataire (8)
135.	Olympique Le Hamel (10)	5–1	ES Formerie (11)
136.	AF Étaples Haute Ville (10)	2–1	US Lieuvillers (11)
137.	US Pas-en-Artois (11)	1–3 (a.e.t.)	FC Ailly-sur-Somme Samara (7)
138.	US Daours Vecquemont Bussy Aubigny (11)	1–3	FC Liancourt-Clermont (8)
139.	Verton FC (9)	4–2 (a.e.t.)	FC Méaulte (10)
140.	Amiens Picardie FC (11)	1–3	US Bresloise (9)
141.	AS Maignelay-Montigny (12)	0–1	US Villers-St Paul (9)
142.	AS Berck (9)	1–2	US Breteuil (7)
143.	USE St Leu d'Esserent (9)	1–2 (a.e.t.)	US Balagny-St Epin (7)
144.	US Nogent (6)	0–3	USM Senlisienne (6)
145.	SC St Just-en-Chaussée (8)	0–7	AC Amiens (5)
146.	ES Harondel (10)	6–5	FC Fontainettes St Aubin (11)
147.	AJ Laboissière-en-Thelle (10)	2–2 (3–1 p)	US Meru Sandricourt (8)
148.	AS Picquigny (13)	0–9	US St Maximin (7)
149.	JSA Compiègne-La Croix-St Ouen (10)	1–3	US Margny-lès-Compiègne (8)
150.	AS Rochy-Condé (11)	6–0	UA Fère-en-Tardenois (10)
151.	FC Longueil-Annel (8)	0–3	AS Beauvais Oise (5)
152.	FC Ruraville (12)	0–2	Amiens RIF (9)
153.	AF Amiens (13)	0–1	US Abbeville (9)
154.	US Rosières (10)	4–2	EFC Dieudonné Puiseux (11)
155.	UES Vermand (10)	0–3	ES Compiègne (11)
156.	SC Moreuil (8)	0–5	US Chantilly (6)
157.	Harly Quentin (9)	2–3	AS du Pays Neslois (7)
158.	CS Villeneuve St Germain (9)	3–2	JS Quevauvillers (9)
159.	CS Chaumont-en-Vexin (7)	4–1	US Gouvieux (8)
160.	Château Thierry-Etampes FC (7)	0–3	AFC Compiègne (6)
161.	CS Avilly-St Léonard (9)	2–0	Grandvilliers AC (9)
162.	CS Haudivillers (11)	0–3	AS Ons-en-Bray (11)

=== Fourth round ===
These matches were played on 28 and 29 September 2019, with one match dependent on the previous round played on 13 October 2019.

Fourth round results: Hauts-de-France
Tie no	Home team (tier)	Score	Away team (tier)
1.	FC Saultain (12)	0–5	Iris Club de Croix (4)
2.	RC Bergues (10)	1–0	JS Longuenesse (8)
3.	FC Madeleinois (9)	2–2 (5–4 p)	Stade Béthunois (6)
4.	AJ Laboissière-en-Thelle (10)	1–3	US Pérenchies (9)
5.	USO Drocourt (10)	2–4	SC Abbeville (7)
6.	US Wattrelos (8)	1–2 (a.e.t.)	SC Coquelles (8)
7.	FC Ailly-sur-Somme Samara (7)	1–0	US St Pol-sur-Ternoise (8)
8.	SC Hazebrouck (6)	1–2	Le Touquet AC (5)
9.	FC Lillers (12)	0–4	US Abbeville (9)
10.	US St Quentin-Bléssy (9)	1–9	Stade Portelois (5)
11.	JS Miannay-Moyenneville-Lambercourt (8)	0–2	OS Aire-sur-la-Lys (6)
12.	AS Beaurains (10)	2–0	AS Sailly-Labourse (11)
13.	US Erre-Hornaing (9)	1–4	AFC Compiègne (6)
14.	Roubaix SC (8)	0–4	US Saint-Omer (6)
15.	USO Bruay-la-Buissière (8)	1–2	AEF Leforest (8)
16.	USAC Somain (10)	1–0	Olympique Flinois (10)
17.	ES Genech (10)	1–2	ES Weppes (9)
18.	Stade Orchésien (9)	3–1	FC Lecelles-Rosult (10)
19.	CS La Gorgue (7)	2–4 (a.e.t.)	OS Fives (7)
20.	Stella Lys (9)	0–2 (a.e.t.)	AS Étaples (7)
21.	US St Maurice Loos-en-Gohelle (6)	1–2	AS Gamaches (7)
22.	US Béthencourt-sur-Mer (11)	0–6	US Esquelbecq (7)
23.	FC Iwuy (11)	2–4	US Blériot-Plage (7)
24.	Calais FCHF (10)	2–0	US Portugais Roubaix Tourcoing (7)
25.	Éclair Neufchâtel-Hardelot (9)	1–4	Olympique Grande-Synthe (5)
26.	US Montigny-en-Ostrevent (11)	0–10	Wasquehal Football (6)
27.	AS Nortkerque 95 (8)	4–1	JS Lille Wazemmes (9)
28.	FC Raismes (8)	0–0 (7–6 p)	Mons AC (8)
29.	AS Steenvorde (7)	1–4	Grand Calais Pascal FC (7)
30.	FC Wattignies (10)	0–4	Verton FC (9)
31.	ASC Roubaix (12)	4–0	Leers OF (8)
32.	AS Marck (6)	3–2	FC Dunkerque-Malo Plage (7)
33.	ESL Boulogne-sur-Mer (10)	0–1	AF Étaples Haute Ville (10)
34.	OC Roubaisien (8)	5–2 (a.e.t.)	FC Lambersart (8)
35.	AS Rochy-Condé (11)	0–5	ES Pigeonnier Amiens (9)
36.	US Attin (9)	0–3	US Gravelines (6)
37.	ACS Hoymille (9)	1–10	US Tourcoing FC (6)
38.	JS Steenwerck (10)	1–4	SCO Roubaix (8)
39.	AS Sin-le-Noble (7)	1–1 (2–4 p)	FA Neuvilloise (8)
40.	JS Ghyveldoise (10)	1–2	US Yser (9)
41.	FC Annœullin (10)	0–4	Olympique Marcquois Football (5)
42.	Amiens RIF (9)	5–2	CS Villeneuve St Germain (9)
43.	Tilloy FC (10)	0–4	US Breteuil (7)
44.	US Plessis-Brion (9)	1–4	US Camon (6)
45.	US Villers-St Paul (9)	0–1	US Pont Ste-Maxence (7)
46.	AFC Creil (8)	0–1	CS Chaumont-en-Vexin (7)
47.	ES Compiègne (11)	1–9	ESC Longueau (6)
48.	US Cousolre (9)	1–0	CAS Escaudœuvres (7)
49.	AC Cambrai (6)	2–0	AS Ste Barbe-Oignies (7)
50.	FC Provillois (10)	1–1 (3–2 p)	AS Beuvry-la-Forêt (8)
51.	US Chevrières-Grandfresnoy (8)	2–0	L'Arsenal Club Achery-Beautor-Charmes (8)
52.	Standard FC Montataire (8)	3–1 (a.e.t.)	CS Avilly-St Léonard (9)
53.	US Bresloise (9)	2–0	ES Harondel (10)
54.	BCV FC (9)	4–4 (2–4 p)	US St Maximin (7)
55.	US Rosières (10)	1–3	Olympique Le Hamel (10)
56.	Stade Ressontois (9)	0–3	AS Beauvais Oise (5)
57.	AC Amiens (5)	4–4 (5–4 p)	US Chantilly (6)
58.	US Balagny-St Epin (7)	1–0	FC Liancourt-Clermont (8)
59.	US Sailly-Saillisel (11)	0–1	Tergnier FC (8)
60.	US Margny-lès-Compiègne (8)	2–4	USM Senlisienne (6)
61.	OM Cambrai Amérique (9)	1–2	US Laon (6)
62.	FC Marpent (7)	2–0	AS Hautmont (8)
63.	US Fourmies (8)	5–0	US Rouvroy (9)
64.	ASG Louvroil (9)	1–2	St Saulve Foot (10)
65.	Faches-Thumesnil FC (11)	2–1	US St André (7)
66.	US Monchy-au-Bois (10)	0–1	US Pays de Cassel (7)
67.	AS Violaines (10)	3–2 (a.e.t.)	AS Douzies (8)
68.	US Nœux-les-Mines (6)	2–0	US Vimy (5)
69.	FC Lille Sud (9)	0–2	CS Avion (6)
70.	CS Amiens Montières Étouvie (8)	2–3	ES Bully-les-Mines (8)
71.	RC Labourse (9)	– (Note: The match was abandoned after a pitch invasion in the 119th minute, just after US Ascq had scored to make the scoreline 1–2. The league disciplinary committee disqualified both teams from the competition.)	US Ascq (7)
72.	US Billy-Berclau (9)	0–3	US Maubeuge (5)
73.	US Buire-Hirson-Thiérache (8)	1–2	US Chauny (6)
74.	USO Meurchin (10)	4–2	US Ribemont Mezieres FC (8)
75.	AS du Pays Neslois (7)	1–3 (a.e.t.)	Feignies Aulnoye FC (5)
76.	ES Boussois (10)	0–2	Olympique Lumbrois (7)
77.	AS Ons-en-Bray (11)	0–10	Olympique Saint-Quentin (4)
78.	FC Lehaucourt (11)	2–2 (7–8 p)	Olympique Maroilles (11)
79.	US Ruch Carvin (11)	0–4	FC Avesnes-sur-Helpe (8)
80.	ES Montcornet (9)	2–1	AG Solrézienne (10)
81.	US Auberchicourt (13)	1–3 (a.e.t.)	US Bruyères-et-Montbérault (8)
82.	RC Vaudricourt (14)	1–4	SC Guesnain (8)

=== Fifth round ===
These matches were played on 12 and 13 October 2019, with one match dependent on the previous round played on 20 October 2019.

Fifth round results: Hauts-de-France
Tie no	Home team (tier)	Score	Away team (tier)
1.	FC Avesnes-sur-Helpe (8)	1–7	USL Dunkerque (3)
2.	ASC Roubaix (12)	0–2 (a.e.t.)	Grand Calais Pascal FC (7)
3.	US Maubeuge (5)	1–2	US Laon (6)
4.	US Blériot-Plage (7)	1–4	Olympique Grande-Synthe (5)
5.	US Pérenchies (9)	1–2 (a.e.t.)	Le Touquet AC (5)
6.	US Gravelines (6)	1–0	FC Marpent (7)
7.	ES Montcornet (9)	1–0	OS Fives (7)
8.	US Fourmies (8)	1–0 (a.e.t.)	FC Madeleinois (9)
9.	US Cousolre (9)	0–1	AC Cambrai (6)
10.	US Breteuil (7)	3–5	US Nœux-les-Mines (6)
11.	Olympique Maroilles (11)	1–0	USAC Somain (10)
12.	Stade Orchésien (9)	1–2 (a.e.t.)	Olympique Saint-Quentin (4)
13.	US Bruyères-et-Montbérault (8)	0–3	US Esquelbecq (7)
14.	US Chauny (6)	0–2	AFC Compiègne (6)
15.	AS Nortkerque 95 (8)	1–3	AC Amiens (5)
16.	AS Violaines (10)	2–4	US Pont Ste-Maxence (7)
17.	SC Coquelles (8)	– (Note: Walkover for SC Coquelles due to both teams from the fourth round tie being disqualified.)	winner tie 71
18.	Olympique Lumbrois (7)	3–1	US Chevrières-Grandfresnoy (8)
19.	St Saulve Foot (10)	1–1 (0–3 p)	US Tourcoing FC (6)
20.	Verton FC (9)	1–0	USO Meurchin (10)
21.	Calais FCHF (10)	– (Note: Match abandoned in extra time with the scoreline 1–0, when the players from FC Raismes left the pitch due to alleged racist comments from fans of Calais FCHF. The referee reported that the match was abandoned due to there being insufficient players from FC Raismes to continue the game. The league committee penalised FC Raismes for leaving the field of play, and Calais FCHF qualified.)	FC Raismes (8)
22.	US Saint-Omer (6)	4–0	OS Aire-sur-la-Lys (6)
23.	AF Étaples Haute Ville (10)	1–4	Stade Portelois (5)
24.	Feignies Aulnoye FC (5)	1–2	AS Marck (6)
25.	OC Roubaisien (8)	– (Note: Match abandoned with the scoreline 0–1 after the assistant referee was struck by an object thrown from the crowd. OC Roubaisien penalised. AS Beauvais Oise qualify.)	AS Beauvais Oise (5)
26.	ES Weppes (9)	0–0 (1–3 p)	Standard FC Montataire (8)
27.	FC Provillois (10)	0–4	AS Étaples (7)
28.	US St Maximin (7)	4–2 (a.e.t.)	SC Guesnain (8)
29.	US Camon (6)	0–4	Iris Club de Croix (4)
30.	Amiens RIF (9)	3–4 (a.e.t.)	USM Senlisienne (6)
31.	SC Abbeville (7)	2–0	FC Ailly-sur-Somme Samara (7)
32.	ES Bully-les-Mines (8)	1–3 (a.e.t.)	US Balagny-St Epin (7)
33.	FA Neuvilloise (8)	1–3	ESC Longueau (6)
34.	Faches-Thumesnil FC (11)	0–3	CS Avion (6)
35.	US Yser (9)	0–1 (a.e.t.)	RC Bergues (10)
36.	US Bresloise (9)	0–5	US Boulogne (3)
37.	US Abbeville (9)	2–0 (a.e.t.)	AS Beaurains (10)
38.	CS Chaumont-en-Vexin (7)	0–2	US Pays de Cassel (7)
39.	Tergnier FC (8)	1–2	AEF Leforest (8)
40.	Olympique Le Hamel (10)	1–4	Wasquehal Football (6)
41.	ES Pigeonnier Amiens (9)	0–2	Olympique Marcquois Football (5)
42.	SCO Roubaix (8)	1–1 (4–2 p)	AS Gamaches (7)

=== Sixth round ===
These matches were played on 26 and 27 October and 3 November 2019.

Sixth round results: Hauts-de-France
Tie no	Home team (tier)	Score	Away team (tier)
1.	US Laon (6)	0–1	Olympique Lumbrois (7)
2.	Standard FC Montataire (8)	1–7	US Nœux-les-Mines (6)
3.	SC Coquelles (8)	1–3	Olympique Grande-Synthe (5)
4.	Calais FCHF (10)	1–2	US Saint-Omer (6)
5.	ES Montcornet (9)	1–4	US Gravelines (6)
6.	US Abbeville (9)	1–3 (a.e.t.)	USL Dunkerque (3)
7.	US Fourmies (8)	0–1	AS Beauvais Oise (5)
8.	AS Marck (6)	0–0 (5–6 p)	AC Cambrai (6)
9.	US Pays de Cassel (7)	0–2	Le Touquet AC (5)
10.	RC Bergues (10)	0–2	Grand Calais Pascal FC (7)
11.	AEF Leforest (8)	0–2	US Pont Ste-Maxence (7)
12.	Olympique Marcquois Football (5)	2–0	AC Amiens (5)
13.	AS Étaples (7)	0–0 (2–4 p)	US Boulogne (3)
14.	Wasquehal Football (6)	3–2	SC Abbeville (7)
15.	US Balagny-St Epin (7)	0–3	Olympique Saint-Quentin (4)
16.	CS Avion (6)	1–2 (a.e.t.)	US St Maximin (7)
17.	Verton FC (9)	2–0	ESC Longueau (6)
18.	Olympique Maroilles (11)	1–2	USM Senlisienne (6)
19.	US Esquelbecq (7)	0–1 (a.e.t.)	US Tourcoing FC (6)
20.	SCO Roubaix (8)	1–3 (a.e.t.)	Iris Club de Croix (4)
21.	Stade Portelois (5)	0–0 (5–3 p)	AFC Compiègne (6)
