= AS Étaples =

French football club

Étaples
- Full name: Association Sportive Étaples
- Founded: 1937
- Ground: Stade François Guilluy
- League: Régional 2 Hauts-de-France; Group B
- Website: https://as-etaples.footeo.com/

Association Sportive Étaples is a football club located in Étaples, France. It competes in the Régional 2, the seventh tier of French football, as of the 2021–22 season. The club's colours are yellow and blue and its home ground is the Stade François Guilluy.

The club has competed numerous times in the Coupe de France, notably reaching the seventh round of the tournament in the 2016–17 season before losing 2–0 to Ligue 2 side Valenciennes.
