= AFC Compiègne =

French football club

- Full name: Association Football Club de Compiègne
- Founded: 1993; 32 years ago
- Ground: Stade Paul Cosyns
- Capacity: 15,000
- Chairman: (France) Philippe Tourre
- Manager: (France) Patrick Vallée
- League: National 3 Group G
- 2022–23: National 3 Group I, 7th
- Website: http://afc-compiegne.net
Home colours	Away colours

L'Association Football Club de Compiègne or AFC Compiègne is a French football club based in the commune of Compiègne.

As of the 2022–23 season, they play in Championnat National 3, the fifth tier of French football. Their kit colours are yellow and blue. They play their home matches at the Stade Paul Cosyns in Compiègne.

== History ==
The club was founded in 1993 after two former clubs, Stade Compiègnois and AS Compiègne Clos des Roses, merged to make one team in the town. From their first season in 1993–1994 season they played in the DH, the sixth tier of French football until the 2002–2003 season when they gained promotion to the Championnat de France Amateurs 2, where they stayed for two seasons until they again won promotion to the Championnat de France Amateurs, where they still play now.

== Current squad ==
As of 13 January 2017.

Note: Flags indicate national team as defined under FIFA eligibility rules; some limited exceptions apply. Players may hold more than one non-FIFA nationality.

No.	Pos.	Nation	Player
—	GK	(France) FRA	Karim Sahnoune
—	DF	(France) FRA	Hubert Aulon
—	DF	(France) FRA	Antoine Bangoura
—	DF	(France) FRA	Maxime Escande
—	DF	(France) FRA	Louis Lahitte
—	DF	(France) FRA	Christophe Lavir
—	DF	(France) FRA	Jérémy Stokowski
—	MF	(France) FRA	Bastien Benoît
—	MF	(France) FRA	Stèphane Chrétien
—	MF	(France) FRA	Aymeric Engueleguele

No.	Pos.	Nation	Player
—	MF	(France) FRA	Wilfried Harand
—	MF	(France) FRA	Farid Oukadi
—	MF	(France) FRA	Oumar N'Diaye
—	MF	(France) FRA	Karim Stitou
—	FW	(France) FRA	Hicham Boulghalache
—	FW	(France) FRA	Sekou Konate
—	FW	(France) FRA	Anthony Poix
—	FW	(France) FRA	Ibrahim Sall
—	FW	(France) FRA	Swann Savineau

== Colours ==
Their kit colours are yellow and blue. The current kit manufacturer is Nike. The home kit is a yellow shirt and shorts with blue navy socks, and the away kit is a blue navy shirt with white arms, and blue navy shorts and socks

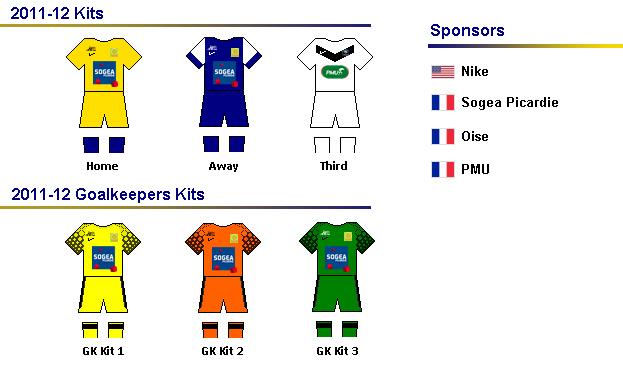

== Honours ==
- Division 4 Group A: 1984
- DH Picardie Group: 1980, 2003
- DH Nord-Est: 1963
- Coupe de Picardie: 2003
- Coupe de l'Oise: 2003, 2010
