= Le Touquet AC =

French football club

- Full name: Le Touquet Athlétic Club Football Côte-d'Opale
- Founded: 1933
- Ground: Stade Gérard Houllier
- President: Sébastien Boyard
- Head coach: Charles Antoine Lepretre
- League: Régional 3 Hauts-de-France, Group A (2023–24)
- Website: https://touquetfootball.fr

Le Touquet Athlétic Club Football Côte-d'Opale, commonly known simply as Le Touquet, is a French association football club based in the commune of Le Touquet-Paris-Plage in the Pas-de-Calais department of northern France. As of the 2023–24 season, it competes in the Régional 3, the eighth tier of French football.

The club was founded in 1933 as the result of a merger between two local clubs, Olympique Touquettois and US Le Touquet-Paris-Plage, and adopted its current name in 1996. Its stadium is named after former France, Paris Saint-Germain and Liverpool manager Gérard Houllier, who was a player and coach at the club during the 1970s.

Although the club has spent much of its history in the lower reaches of the French football league system, they competed in Division 2 during the 1988–89 season. The men's senior team regularly competes in the Coupe de France, the country's foremost knock-out competition.

== Honours ==
- Division 3 Group Nord: 1987–88
- Division 4 Group A: 1983–84, 1986–87
- Régional 1 Nord-Pas-de-Calais: 2017–18
