= US Roye-Noyon =

French football club

Roye-Noyon
- Full name: Union Sportive Roye-Noyon Cœur de Picardie
- Nickname: USRN
- Founded: 21 June 2010
- Ground: Stade André-Coël
- Capacity: 2,500
- Chairman: Guy Capelier
- Manager: Pascal Manteau
- League: Régional 1 Hauts-de-France
- Website: www.roye-noyon.fr

Union Sportive Roye-Noyon Cœur de Picardie is a French association football club founded in 2010 as a result of a merger between Union Sportive Royenne (founded in 1928) and Sporting Club Noyon (founded in 1927). It is based in Roye, Somme, France and plays in Régional 1 Hauts-de-France, the sixth tier in the French football league system. They play at the Stade André-Coël in Roye.

== History ==
US Roye-Noyon was formed on 21 June 2010 as a result of a merger between Union Sportive Royenne and Sporting Club Noyon, who were both in financial difficulty. The former club of US Royenne club participated in the Championnat National during the 2004–05 season.

The two towns of Roye and Noyon are over 20 kilometers (12 miles) apart, and are not in the same department. Roye is in the Somme while Noyon is in the Oise department. US Roye-Noyon is based in Roye, but was initially affiliated to the Oise district of the Picardie league until the 2020–21 season. In the 2021–22 season, the club joined the Somme district of the Picardie league.

== Season-by-season record ==
Note: statistics prior to the 2010–11 season belong to the defunct football club US Royenne.

Year	Level	Division	Position
1997–98	7	Promotion d'Honneur Picardie	
1998–99	7	Promotion d'Honneur Picardie	1st
1999–00	6	Division d'Honneur Picardie	5th
2000–01	6	Division d'Honneur Picardie	1st
2001–02	5	CFA 2 Group A	7th
2002–03	5	CFA Group B	2nd
2003–04	4	CFA Group A	1st
2004–05	3	Championnat National	20th
2005–06	4	CFA Group A	4th
2006–07	5	CFA 2 Group A	9th
2007–08	5	CFA 2 Group A	12th
2008–09	5	CFA 2 Group B	9th
2009–10	5	CFA 2 Group B	5th
2010–11	5	CFA 2 Group B	5th
2011–12	5	CFA 2 Group B	1st
2012–13	4	CFA Group A	4th
2013–14	4	CFA Group A	4th
2014–15	4	CFA Group A	10th
2015–16	4	CFA Group A	16th
2016–17	5	CFA 2 Group C	10th
