= US Lesquin =

Association football club in France

- Full name: Union sportive de Lesquin
- Founded: 1920; 105 years ago
- Ground: Stade Jean-Pierre Papin
- Capacity: 1,500
- Chairman: Guy Peureux
- Manager: Jérôme Scache
- League: Championnat de France Amateurs
- 2005-06: Championnat de France Amateurs Group A, 8th
Home colours	Away colours

Union sportive de Lesquin is a French association football team founded in 1920. They are based in Lesquin, Nord-Pas-de-Calais, France and are currently playing in the Championnat de France Amateurs Group A. They play at the Stade Jean-Pierre Papin in Lesquin, which has a capacity of 1,500.
