= SC Hazebrouck =

French football club

- Full name: Sporting Club Hazebrouckois
- Founded: 1907; 118 years ago
- Ground: Stade Auguste Demette, Hazebrouck
- Capacity: 1,500
- League: Championnat de France Amateurs 2
- 2007-2008: Championnat de France Amateurs 2 Group A, 8th
Home colours	Away colours

Sporting Club Hazebrouckois is a French football club based in Hazebrouck, Nord-Pas-de-Calais. It was founded in 1907. The club currently plays in the Championnat de France Amateurs 2, the fifth tier of the French football league system.

== Honours ==
- Champions Championnat National : 1973
