= AS Marck =

French association football team

Association Sportive de Marck is a French association football team. It is based in Marck, Pas-de-Calais, France and plays in Regional 1 Nord-Pas-de-Calais, effectively the sixth tier in the French football league system.

== Coupe de France ==
Marck has achieved notable success in the Coupe de France in recent seasons, culminating in a 1/32-finals appearance in the 2011–12 edition where the club lost to Ligue 1's OGC Nice. The club also reached the 8th round of the 2009–10, 2010–11 and 2015–16 Coupe de France, and the 7th round of the 2006–07, 2008–09, 2012–13 and 2014–15 Coupe de France.

== Notable players ==
- (France) Lucas Chevalier (youth)
