= Union Sportive Gravelines Football =

Gravelines
- Full name: Union Sportive Gravelinoise Football
- Nickname: Bleu et Blanc
- Founded: 30 December 1941; 84 years ago
- Ground: Stade des Huttes; Gravelines, France
- Capacity: 1,500
- President: Christian Duhamel
- Head coach: Lec Dunez
- League: R2 – Hauts-de-France
- Website: www.usgravelinesfootball.fr
Home colours	Away colours

Union Sportive Gravelines Football is a French association football team founded in 1941. They are based in Gravelines, Nord. Their home stadium is the Stade des Huttes in the town. Playing it R2 – Hauts-de-France.

== History ==
=== 1987-1993: Breakthrough to the gates of professional football ===
From 1942 to 1987, the Gravelines only makes trips between Division d'Honneur and Division d'Honneur Regional. In 1988, the Gravelines missed the rise in 4th Division and did the same in 1989. The Gravelines won the first title in its history by winning the DH championship in 1990. The following year, the USG continued his series winning the CFA. In 1992, the club just missed the rise in Ligue 2. In 1993, in mid-season, the Gravelines was still in good position to reach the top division, the club even managing until 32 Finale Coupe de France.

=== 1993-2008: The fall and the rapid return to Division d'Honneur ===
Between the Gravelines at Stade Lavallois, the 32nd Finale Coupe de France, lost with a score of 3 goals to 1, marking the beginning of the descent into the underworld of the club, especially in parallel, the mayor of Gravelines, Albert Denvers, decided to lower subsidies club, which made from the majority of players of the Gravelines. The club then finished his penultimate season in National then went on with a last place in CFA in 1994, synonymous with relegation in CFA2. In 1995, the Gravelines Division d'Honneur went down by finishing second last in CFA2 and remained 13 years. The club missed the rise in 2002, but ended up winning the Division d'Honneur championship in 2008 and ascended to the CFA2.

=== Since 2008: From Survival in CFA2 return in Division d'Honneur ===
From 2008 to 2010, the Gravelines fought for the rise in the CFA, but since 2010, the club rather fight to maintain in CFA2. Following confirmation of Le Mans administrative demotion in CFA, Gravelines finally fished for the 2013-2014 season CFA2 in his capacity as the 11th best 8 groups of the division. At the end of the 2013-2014 season, the Gravelines finished in last place synonymous with relegation to Division d'Honneur for the 2014–2015 season.

== Honours ==
- Championnat de France Amateur (1)
  - Group A Champion : 1991
- Championnat de Division d'Honneur du Nord-Pas-de-Calais (2)
  - Champion : 1990, 2008
  - Vice-champion : 1988, 1989, 2002
