= AC Cambrai =

French football club

- Full name: Athletic Club Cambrésien
- Founded: 1919; 107 years ago
- Ground: Stade de la Liberté
- League: Régional 1
- 2024–25: Régional 1, 4th of 14
- Website: acc-football.footeo.com
Home colours

Athletic Club Cambrésien is a French association football team founded in 1919. They are based in Cambrai, France and play in the Division d'Honneur Nord Pas de Calais in the French football league system. They play at the Stade de la Liberté in Cambrai.

== Honours ==
- Runner-up of Amateur French Championship: 1966
- Champion of Division d'Honneur Nord : 1964, 1984

== Current squad ==
As of 29 Jan 2009

Note: Flags indicate national team as defined under FIFA eligibility rules; some limited exceptions apply. Players may hold more than one non-FIFA nationality.

No.	Pos.	Nation	Player
—	GK	FRA	Adrien Leduc
—	GK	FRA	Matthieu Flinois
—	DF	FRA	Romain Bataille
—	DF	FRA	Jamel Djezzar
—	DF	FRA	Romain Pottiez
—	MF	FRA	Guillaume Bonnaire
—	MF	FRA	Guillaume Boda
—	MF	CMR	Martial Dika
—	FW	FRA	Stéphane Bécart
—	FW	FRA	Mehdi Bellalij
—	FW	FRA	Thomas Bauduin
—	FW	FRA	Nessim Benaissi
—	FW	FRA	Charles Gamblon
—	MF	FRA	Jonathan Gillard
—	MF	FRA	Cédric Hubert
—	MF	FRA	Rénald Ségard
—		FRA	Ameur Aouamri
—		FRA	Khalid Alou
—		FRA	Gaétan Antinori
—		FRA	Halil Bouziane
—		FRA	Julien Cattiaux
—		FRA	Elton Ngwatala

No.	Pos.	Nation	Player
—		FRA	Mehdi Dahmane
—		FRA	William Deschamps
—		FRA	Emilien Dentz
—		FRA	Depri Djohoré
—		FRA	Pierre Dolay
—		FRA	Jean-Francois Duchatelle
—		FRA	Sylvain Guidez
—		FRA	Francois Jonas
—		FRA	Pierrick Lapointe
—		FRA	Mustapha Lazracq
—		FRA	Adam Maabdi
—		FRA	Tony Milhem
—		FRA	Patrick Moundi
—		FRA	Blaise Ndetou
—		FRA	Florent Pierrin
—		CMR	Charles Pokam Madou
—		FRA	Florian Rivaux
—		FRA	Remy Robert
—		FRA	Cedric Roux
—		FRA	Mehdi Stallone
—		BEL	Maximillian Vandenberghe
—		FRA	Pierre Vandermerein
