= 2024–25 Coupe de France preliminary rounds, Hauts-de-France =

The 2024–25 Coupe de France preliminary rounds, Hauts-de-France was the qualifying competition to decide which teams from the leagues of the Hauts-de-France region of France took part in the main competition from the seventh round.

A total of twenty-one teams qualified from the Hauts-de-France preliminary rounds.

In 2023–24, Entente Feignies Aulnoye FC progressed the furthest from the region, reaching the round of 32 by knocking out Ligue 2 side US Quevilly-Rouen, before losing at home to Montpellier HSC in a game that had been postponed due to snow.

== Draws and fixtures ==
Draws for the first two rounds were carried out separately by districts. In Artois, the first round draw was published on 25 July 2024, and the second round draw was published on 27 August 2024. 62 ties were drawn in the first round, and 47 in the second round. In Escaut, both draws were published on 13 August 2024. 70 ties were drawn in the first round, and 53 ties in the second. In Flandres, both draws were published on 18 July 2024. 57 ties were drawn in the first round, and 43 ties in the second round. In Côte d'Opale, the first round draw was published on 7 August 2024, and the second round draw was published on 26 August 2024. 56 ties were drawn in the first round, and 43 in the second round. In Aisne, the first round draw was published on 17 July 2024, and the second round draw was published on 26 August 2024. 40 ties were drawn in the first round, and 29 in the second round. In Oise, the first round draw was published on 25 July 2024, and the second round draw was published on 27 August 2024. 48 ties were drawn in the first round, and 37 in the second round. In Somme, the first round draw was published on 11 July 2024, and the second round draw was published on 26 August 2024. 46 ties were drawn in the first round, and 36 in the second round.

The draw for the third round, which saw the remaining clubs from the Regional divisions, and those from Championnat National 3 enter the competition, was published on 6 September 2024. 159 ties were drawn. The fourth round draw, which saw clubs from Championnat National 2 enter the competition, was published on 19 September 2024. 82 ties were drawn. The fifth round draw, which saw the two clubs from Championnat National enter the competition, was published on 3 October 2024. 42 ties were drawn. The 21 ties of the sixth round draw were published on 17 October 2024.

=== First round ===
These matches are from the district of Artois, and were played on 25 August 2024.

First Round Results: Hauts-de-France (Artois)
Tie no	Home team (Tier)	Score	Away team (Tier)
1.	US Houdain (12)	1–2	ES Val Sensée (13)
2.	AS Salomé (13)	2–2 (4–2 p)	AC Noyelles-Godault (9)
3.	ES Thiennes (15)	1–4	Diables Rouges Lambres-lez-Aire (13)
4.	ES Agny (12)	1–2	ES Ficheux (12)
5.	FC Méricourt (13)	3–3 (8–7 p) (Note: FC Méricourt penalised for fielding a suspended player. US Lestrem qualify.)	US Lestrem (10)
6.	ES Laventie (10)	1–2	RC Sains (11)
7.	FC Verquigneuil (13) (Note: FC Verquigneuil replaced AS Pont-à-Vendin in the draw.)	2–5	AS Maroeuil (10)
8.	RC Bours (14)	1–3	FC Beaumont (12)
9.	AS Frévent (12)	2–2 (5–4 p)	US Croisilles (10)
10.	OSC Vitry-en-Artois (14)	2–2 (4–5 p)	AS Vallée de la Ternoise (11)
11.	US Grenay (11)	1–4	ÉS Saint-Laurent-Blangy-Feuchy (9)
12.	US Heuchin Lisbourg (13)	5–4	AS Quiéry-la-Motte (14)
13.	AS Beaurains (12)	4–1	SC Aubigny Savy-Berlette Camblain-l'Abbé (13)
14.	FC Cuinchy (14)	0–4	AS Bapaume-Bertincourt-Vaulx-Vraucourt (12)
15.	FCE La Bassée (13)	2–2 (2–4 p)	US Pas-en-Artois (11)
16.	FC Hauts Lens (13)	2–1 (Note: FC Hauts Lens penalised for fielding a suspended player. US Lapugnoy qualify.)	US Lapugnoy (12)
17.	AS Vendin 2000 (13)	2–1	Auchel FC (11)
18.	AAE Évin-Malmaison (13)	3–0 (Note: Tie won by means of forfeit.)	ES Ourton (14)
19.	US Maisnil (11)	1–2	USO Lens (9)
20.	CS Pernes (13)	1–4	AS Auchy-les-Mines (12)
21.	FC Dynamo Carvin Fosse 4 (12)	1–2	AS Tincquizel (10)
22.	US Ham-en-Artois (14)	2–5	CS Habarcq (10)
23.	USC Monchy-Breton (13)	0–0 (3–4 p)	ES Allouagne (12)
24.	AEP Verdrel (13)	1–0	Sud Artois Foot (11)
25.	FC Richebourg (14)	1–3	Olympique La Comté Omnisport (15)
26.	US Gonnehem-Chocques (11)	6–3	FC Annay (11)
27.	US Izel-lès-Équerchin (13)	2–2 (3–4 p)	AS Barlin (12)
28.	AS Violaines (10)	6–1 (Note: OS Annequin penalised for fielding a suspended player.)	OS Annequin (11)
29.	US Mondicourt (14)	1–4 (Note: FC Hersin penalised for fielding a suspended player. US Mondicourt qualify.)	FC Hersin (10)
30.	ES Haillicourt (14) (Note: ES Haillicourt replaced ES Bois-Bernard Acheville in the draw.)	2–5	Tilloy FC (13)
31.	ES Sainte-Catherine (10)	5–3	Olympique Burbure (11)
32.	RC Vaudricourt Kennedy (11)	4–0	US Billy-Berclau (10)
33.	US Boubers-Conchy (12)	0–3	FC La Roupie-Isbergues (11)
34.	AS Bonnières Houvin (15)	1–3	CSAL Souchez (12)
35.	FC Servins (13)	4–1	FC Tortequesne (13)
36.	FC Estevelles (13)	4–2	AS Bailleul-Sir-Berthoult (13)
37.	AJ Artois (12)	2–1	FC Hinges (12)
38.	AS Cauchy-à-la-Tour (12)	0–0 (3–4 p)	FC Camblain-Châtelain (11)
39.	SC Artésien (9)	1–1 (4–2 p)	JF Guarbecque (10)
40.	US Cheminots Avion (11)	2–1	AFC Libercourtois (12)
41.	AS Lyssois (13)	0–7 (Note: ES Haisnes penalised for fielding a suspended player. AS Lyssois qualify.)	ES Haisnes (10)
42.	AAE Dourges (14)	0–6	ES Angres (9)
43.	US Hesdigneul (11)	3–3 (4–2 p) (Note: Tie reversed from original draw.)	AS Noyelles-lès-Vermelles (14
44.	US Ruch Carvin (12)	4–1	USO Drocourt (13)
45.	Entente Verquin-Béthune (13)	0–9	AS Neuvireuil-Gavrelle (12)
46.	USA Liévin (11)	1–3	US Saint-Maurice Loos-en-Gohelle (9)
47.	AS Roclincourt (15)	0–1	US Rouvroy (9)
48.	Intrépides Norrent-Fontes (13)	1–2	FC Givenchy-en-Gohelle (12)
49.	AS Sailly-Labourse (12)	2–6	SC Fouquières (11)
50.	RC Locon 2000 (13)	0–2	US Ablain (11)
51.	ASPTT Arras (14)	0–10	AS Courrièroise (11)
52.	AJ Ruitz (13)	6–1	FC Bouvigny-Boyeffles (12)
53.	Atrébate FC (12)	3–0	ES Douvrin (12)
54.	ÉS Rœux (14)	3–3 (4–3 p)	FC Dainvillois (13)
55.	Olympique Arras (10)	4–0	US Beuvry (10)
56.	SCF Achicourt (12)	0–3	Stade Héninois (10)
57.	AS Kennedy Hénin-Beaumont (15)	1–4	UC Divion (10)
58.	FC Busnes (13)	1–3	Olympique Liévin (11)
59.	AG Grenay (15)	3–6	US Arleux-en-Gohelle (12)
60.	ES Eleu (14)	1–10	AS Loison (10)
61.	OC Cojeul (12)	0–1	AAE Aix-Noulette (10)
62.	JF Mazingarbe (11)	1–0 (Note: JF Mazingarbe penalised for fielding a suspended player. US Monchy-au-Bois qualify.)	US Monchy-au-Bois (9)

These matches are from the district of Escaut, and were played on 25 August 2024.

First Round Results: Hauts-de-France (Escaut)
Tie no	Home team (Tier)	Score	Away team (Tier)
1.	Wignehies Olympique (12)	2–0 (Note: Wignehies Olympique penalised for fielding a suspended player. US Villers-Sire-Nicole qualify.)	US Villers-Sire-Nicole (12)
2.	US Sars-Poteries (13)	3–1	FC Leval (14)
3.	SC Maubeuge (14)	5–4	US Ohain (13)
4.	AS Étrœungt (13)	2–1	JS Avesnelloise (12)
5.	AS Trélon (12)	0–1	IC Ferrière-la-Grande (10)
6.	US Glageon (14)	0–4	US Gommegnies-Carnoy (11)
7.	SC Saint-Remy-du Nord (12)	2–1	AS Obies (13)
8.	AS Recquignies (11)	3–0	AFC Colleret (12)
9.	US Bousies Forest (12)	4–2	AFC Ferrière-la-Petite (11)
10.	ES Boussois (10)	0–2	AS La Longueville (11)
11.	SC Bachant (13)	10–0	Maubeuge Olympique (13)
12.	US Cartignies (14)	3–3 (5–4 p)	AS Douzies (10)
13.	AS Dompierre (14)	0–11	FC Avesnes-sur-Helpe (9)
14.	AG Solrézienne (10)	2–0	FC Anor (11)
15.	AS Bellignies (13)	3–6	FC Jenlain (13)
16.	SCEPS Pont-sur-Sambre (12)	4–4 (4–2 p)	OSC Assevent (10)
17.	AS Neuvilly (13)	2–2 (6–7 p)	AS Masnières (11)
18.	US Briastre (13)	0–3	US Saint-Souplet (12)
19.	US Béthencourt (14)	1–4	US Rumilly-en-Cambrésis (12)
20.	RC Élincourt (14)	3–4	US Quievy (10)
21.	US Les Rues-des-Vignes (11)	2–0	FC Saulzoir (10)
22.	AO Hermies (11)	1–1 (3–5 p)	ES Paillencourt-Estrun (11)
23.	FC Saint-Python (14)	0–1	FC Fontaine-au-Bois (10)
24.	US Busigny (13)	2–3	AS Vendegies-Escarmain (11)
25.	AC Bermerain (14)	2–2 (3–4 p)	Olympique Saint-Ollois (12)
26.	FC Maretz (14)	0–7	SC Le Cateau (10)
27.	US Fontaine-Notre-Dame (11)	3–2	US Walincourt-Selvigny (10)
28.	FC Iwuy (10)	1–2 (Note: Match abandoned in the final minute, after an incident between an official and a supporter. FC Iwuy penalised. FC Neuville-Saint-Rémy qualify.)	FC Neuville-Saint-Rémy (11)
29.	ACRS Portugaise Cambrai (13)	1–3	US Beauvois Fontaine (10)
30.	SS Marcoing (13)	1–4	OC Avesnois (10)
31.	ASE Metz-en-Couture (14)	3–2	US Bertry-Clary (12)
32.	SCO Marquion Bourlon Épinoy (12)	3–3 (4–3 p)	FC Solesmes (12)
33.	US Viesly (14)	3–3 (2–3 p)	US Saint-Aubert (12)
34.	US Aubigny-au-Bac (11)	1–1 (4–5 p)	FC Masny (9)
35.	AS Cuincy (13)	0–15	US Auberchicourt (10)
36.	FC Minier Lewardois (14)	1–7	FC Roost-Warendin (11)
37.	AS Douai-Lambres Cheminots (13)	2–3	US Corbehem (10)
38.	Olympique Marquette (13)	– (Note: USAC Somain penalised for fielding a suspended player. Olympique Marquette qualify. Original scoreline unknown.)	USAC Somain (10)
39.	FC Pecquencourt (14)	1–8	US Pecquencourt (11)
40.	Olympique Landasien (13)	0–7	SC Guesnain (9)
41.	US Frais Marais (12)	0–5	Olympique Senséen (10)
42.	UF Anhiers (11)	1–10	US Raimbeaucourt (10)
43.	AS Coutiches (14)	1–5	FC Bruille-lez-Marchiennes (13)
44.	FC Monchecourt (14)	1–3	OSC Loffre (12)
45.	US Pays de Sensée et d'Ostrevent (12)	1–1 (2–0 p)	Fenain ES (12)
46.	Dechy Sports (12)	3–2	FC Écaillon (13)
47.	DC Lallaing (12)	1–3	Olympic Marchiennois (11)
48.	US Pont Flers (10)	– (Note: US Aubygeoise penalised for fielding a suspended player, US Pont Flers qualify. Original scoreline unknown.)	US Aubygeoise (10)
49.	AS Courchelettes (13)	0–3	RC Lécluse (11)
50.	FC Condé-Macou (11)	7–0	US Quiévrechain (12)
51.	Stade Fresnois (12)	– (Note: Stade Fresnois penalised after USM Beuvrages complained that the goals were not of regulation height. USM Beuvrages qualify. Scoreline unknown.)	USM Beuvrages (12)
52.	US Verchain-Maugré (12)	4–5	AS Château-l'Abbaye (11)
53.	Olympique Onnaingeois (9)	5–3	FC Lecelles-Rosult (10)
54.	US Lieu-Saint-Amand (14)	– (Note: Vieux Condé Foot penalised for fielding a suspended player. US Lieu-Saint-Amand qualify. Original scoreline unknown.)	Vieux Condé Foot (10)
55.	EA Prouvy (11)	2–2 (4–5 p)	Douchy FC (11)
56.	US Haulchin (12)	3–4 (Note: Tie reversed from original draw.)	Inter Condé-sur-l'Escaut (12)
57.	RC Thiant (14)	2–4	US Brillon (13)
58.	ES Hélesmes (14)	0–5	CO Trith-Saint-Léger (10)
59.	ES Noyelles-sur-Selle (13)	0–3	FC Saultain (13)
60.	ES Bouchain (12)	1–4	ÉS Crespin (11)
61.	AS Thivencelle (14)	5–1	Olympique Thun (14)
62.	Saint-Saulve Football (10)	3–2	FC Famars (10)
63.	AS Petite-Forêt (13)	0–8	ES Sebourg-Estreux (11)
64.	Hérin Aubry CLE (12)	0–4	AS Summer Club Valenciennes (9)
65.	ES Mastaing Wavrechain (14)	1–3	Saint-Waast CFC (12)
66.	Anzin FARC (11)	10–0	FC Haspres (12)
67.	FC Hasnon-Millonfosse (12)	0–2	Bruay Sports (10)
68.	AS Artres (13)	1–7	RC Rœulx (10)
69.	US Crespin (13)	2–4	AFC Escautpont (10)
70.	JS Abscon (12)	1–3	Neuville OSC (12)

These matches are from the district of Flandres, and were played on 25 August 2024.

First Round Results: Hauts-de-France (Flandres)
Tie no	Home team (Tier)	Score	Away team (Tier)
1.	FC Lille Sud (9)	3–0 (Note: Tie reversed from original draw.)	US Wallon-Cappel (11)
2.	CS Bousbecque (9)	1–0	UFC Nieppois (10)
3.	ES Cappelle Pont-à-Marcq (12)	0–5	SR Lomme Délivrance (9)
4.	EAC Cysoing-Wannehain-Bourghelles (9)	3–0	US Wattrelos (9)
5.	US Fleurbaix (13)	2–2 (6–7 p)	FC Rosendaël (10)
6.	ÉSC Illies Aubers Lorgies	2–2 (1–4 p)	US Warhem (10)
7.	ES Ennequin-Loos (10)	3–3 (3–1 p)	FC Le Doulieu (10)
8.	Entente Mouchin Bachy (12)	0–6	FC Madeleinois (9)
9.	FC Bierne (12)	3–0	JS Wavrin-Don (11)
10.	US Attiches (12)	1–3	AG Thumeries (10)
11.	US Estaires (11)	0–2 (Note: AS Vieux Lille penalised for fielding a suspended player. US Estaires qualify.)	AS Vieux Lille (13)
12.	RC Herzeele (12)	4–0	FC Houtkerque (13)
13.	Stade Lezennois (9)	4–1	US Wattrelos (9)
14.	ASE Allennes-les-Marais (13)	2–2 (2–4 p)	FC Bauvin (10)
15.	Prémesques FC (11)	0–4	Leers OF (9)
16.	RC Bergues (9)	2–2 (3–4 p)	FC Linselles (9)
17.	OSM Lomme (11)	2–0	FC Mons-en-Barœul (10)
18.	AS Bersée (10)	0–0 (3–4 p)	JS Steenwerck (10)
19.	FA Blanc Seau (11)	1–2	Olympique Hémois FC (9)
20.	ASC Hazebrouck (11)	1–5	US Houplin-Ancoisne (11)
21.	SC Grand-Fort-Philippe (11)	3–1	AJL Caestre (12)
22.	Football Saint-Michel Quesnoy (11)	1–0	UJS Cheminots de Tourcoing (11)
23.	FC Craywick (13)	1–6	FC Steene (11)
24.	ES Weppes (11)	0–9	FC La Chapelle-d'Armentières (10)
25.	Stella Lys (9)	0–1	US Lille Moulins Carrel (9)
26.	Lille AFS Guinée (12)	3–4	US Maritime (10)
27.	ACS Hoymille (11)	0–1	AS Radinghem (10)
28.	FC Grande-Synthe (13)	2–3	CS Gondecourt (11)
29.	AS Jean Baptiste Roubaix (11)	5–3	JS Lille Wazemmes (9)
30.	US Yser (10)	1–0	US Phalempin (10)
31.	ES Wormhout (11)	1–2	OS Fives (9)
32.	Olympique Mérignies (12)	3–1	SC Bourbourg (9)
33.	ES Cappelloise (11)	2–4	AS Baisieux Patro (10)
34.	FC Eecke (13)	0–4	Bac-Sailly Sports (11)
35.	US Hondeghem (11)	0–0 (4–5 p)	FC Méteren (10)
36.	AS Saint-Joseph Hazebrouck (12)	1–1 (5–4 p)	AS Solidarité Lille (13)
37.	AS Usines Dunkerque (13)	0–8	US Ascq (9)
38.	AAJ Uxem (11)	1–2	Pont Rommel Football Hazebrouckois (12)
39.	AS Pont de Nieppe (11)	1–2	US Pérenchies (9)
40.	Association Phoenix FC (13)	0–14	US Antillais Lille Métropole (11)
41.	FC Vieux-Berquin (10)	1–3	ES Mouvaux (9)
42.	US Marquillies (13)	3–3 (9–10 p)	JS Ghyveldoise (10)
43.	OC Roubaisien (11)	4–2 (Note: US Colme penalised for fielding a suspended player.)	US Colme (11)
44.	US Bray-Dunes (12)	2–3	FC Morin (12)
45.	AS Broukerque (12)	0–1	Toufflers AF (10)
46.	FC Santes (11)	1–0 (Note: ACS Comines penalised for fielding a suspended player.)	ACS Comines (10)
47.	EC Camphin-en-Pévèle (12)	3–2	ES Frelinghien (13)
48.	Verlinghem Foot (9)	3–0	AS Templeuve-en-Pévèle (10)
49.	Faches-Thumesnil FC (9)	10–0	ES Lille Louvière Pellevoisin (10)
50.	Sailly Forest Foot (12)	0–5	SM Petite-Synthe (9)
51.	CS EIC Tourcoing (11)	1–1 (4–2 p)	FC Templemars-Vendeville (10)
52.	FC Wattignies (11)	0–6	Flers OS Villeneuve d'Ascq (9)
53.	AF Deux-Synthe (12)	0–6	AS Albeck Grande-Synthe (10)
54.	FC Wambrechies (10)	2–2 (4–5 p)	US Fretin (10)
55.	US Téteghem (9)	5–2	AS Loos Oliveaux (10)
56.	EC Houplines (9)	2–3	USF Coudekerque (10)
57.	FC Annœullin (9)	6–1	US Leffrinckoucke (9)

These matches are from the district of Côte d'Opale, and were played on 24 and 25 August 2024.

First Round Results: Hauts-de-France (Côte d'Opale)
Tie no	Home team (Tier)	Score	Away team (Tier)
1.	ES Mametz (11)	2–8	US Quiestède (9)
2.	US Coulomby (14)	0–1	FC Wardrecques (9)
3.	AS Rang-du-Fliers (11)	1–3	US Seninghem-Nielles-Vaudringhem (9)
4.	FC Wizernes (13)	0–1	AS Esquerdes (13)
5.	FC Thiembronne (14)	0–10	US Blaringhem (9)
6.	AL Camiers (12)	1–2	CS Watten (9)
7.	ES Boisdinghem-Zudausques-Mentque-Nortbécourt (13)	3–0	US Bomy (14)
8.	Longuenesse Malafoot(13)	3–7	AS Fruges (11)
9.	US Créquy-Fressin (11)	1–4	AS Bezinghem (9)
10.	AS Boisjean (14)	1–12	FCP Blendecques (9)
11.	AS Cucq (10)	2–3	JS Racquinghem (10)
12.	Gouy-Saint-André RC (11)	0–8	ES Beaurainville (10)
13.	ES Herbelles-Pihem-Inghem (13)	2–2 (4–3 p)	Entente Steenbecque Morbecque (13)
14.	Pays de la Lys (9)	1–0	FC Saint-Martin-lez-Tatinghem (9)
15.	JS Blangy-sur-Ternoise (13)	1–5	FC Ecques-Heuringhem (12)
16.	AS Hallines (13)	0–4	ES Helfaut (11)
17.	Nieurlet SL (15)	3–1	US Thérouanne (12)
18.	FC Senlecques (13)	2–5	AS Campagne-lès-Hesdin (10)
19.	US Verchocq-Ergny-Herly (10)	0–1	FC Wavrans-sur-l'Aa (11)
20.	US Vieil-Hesdin (13)	1–3	FC Merlimont (10)
21.	US Frencq (12)	2–4	ES Roquetoire (10)
22.	US Coyecques (12)	0–9	Lys Aa FC (10)
23.	FC Hucqueliers (14)	0–5	US Alquines (12)
24.	US Humbert (14)	3–0	AS Fillièvres (13)
25.	AS Maresquel (13)	2–2 (4–3 p)	JS Renescuroise (11)
26.	Union Saint-Loupoise (14)	1–5	US Brimeux (11)
27.	AC Tubersent (13)	5–1	JS Heuringhem (13)
28.	AS Auchy-lès-Hesdin (12)	10–3	US Dannes (12)
29.	AS Portelois (14)	2–1	ASEP Saint-Inglevert (12)
30.	JS Bonningues-lès-Ardres (12)	1–0	AS Andres (13)
31.	JS Condette (13)	5–1	US Polincove (13)
32.	RC Lottinghem (13)	0–2	Athletic Conteville Verte Vallée (13)
33.	US Porteloise (13)	0–13	US Équihen-Plage (9)
34.	RC Samer (11)	4–1	US Hardinghen (12)
35.	RC Brêmes-les-Ardres (13)	0–4	Amicale Pont-de-Briques (10)
36.	ES Licques (10)	3–2	FJEP Fort Vert (10)
37.	FC Wissant (14)	0–6	FC Sangatte (10)
38.	Amicale Balzac (12)	10–0	US Rety (13)
39.	SO Calais (11)	0–1	USO Rinxent (9)
40.	AS Colembert (11)	1–5	US Bourthes (9)
41.	FC Les Attaques (12)	3–0 (Note: Tie won by means of forfeit.)	USM Boulogne-sur-Mer (12)
42.	ES Oye-Plage (12)	1–3 (Note: Tie reversed from original draw.)	US Elinghen-Ferques (12)
43.	FC Calais Caténa (10)	3–1	ESL Boulogne-sur-Mer (10)
44.	USC Wierre-Effroy (12)	1–3	US Ambleteuse (10)
45.	US Landrethun-le-Nord (10)	5–0	Fiennes OSC (15)
46.	FC Bonningues-lès-Calais (13)	1–2	FC Fréthun (11)
47.	AS Balinghem (13)	2–4	US Marais de Gûines (10)
48.	ASL Vieil-Moutier La Calique (11)	0–0 (4–2 p)	FC Isques (10)
49.	AS Saint-Tricat et Nielles (12)	0–4	AS Nortkerque 95 (9)
50.	ES Guînes (10)	0–2	FC Capellois (10)
51.	FJEP Guemps (14)	0–0 (2–3 p)	US Hesdin-l'Abbé (11)
52.	FC Landrethun-lez-Ardres (14)	1–2	AS Surques-Escœuilles (11)
53.	FC Conti (11)	7–0	FC Nordausques (11)
54.	RC Bréquerecque Ostrohove (11)	1–1 (8–9 p)	AS Tournehem (10)
55.	Amicale Calais Pascal FC (14)	1–3	CAP Le Portel (11)
56.	RC Ardrésien (12)	1–3	Le Portel GPF (13)

These matches are from the district of Aisne, and were played on 25 August 2024.

First Round Results: Hauts-de-France (Aisne)
Tie no	Home team (Tier)	Score	Away team (Tier)
1.	US Vervins (10)	1–0	NES Boué-Étreux (11)
2.	US Origny Thenelles (12)	3–2	ESUS Buironfosse-La Capelle (10)
3.	CS Aubenton (12)	1–4	US Rozoy-sur-Serre (11)
4.	Dizy-le-Gros FC (13)	1–2	FC Vaux-Andigny (12)
5.	FC Watigny (12)	1–3	US Guise (10)
6.	AS Tupigny (11)	3–5 (Note: CSO Athies penalised for fielding a suspended player. AS Tupigny qualify.)	CSO Athies (10)
7.	ASC Saint-Michel (13)	3–6	FC Fresnoy Fonsomme (10)
8.	Espoir Sains-Richaumont	1–3	Marle Sports (11)
9.	US Sissonne (13)	1–4	ES Montcornet (11)
10.	AS Martigny (12)	1–0	AS Barenton-Bugny (13)
11.	US Neuve-Maison (12)	0–2	ICS Créçois (10)
12.	Le Nouvion AC (11)	3–2	FC Hannapes (11)
13.	US Vadencourt (13)	1–8	La Concorde de Bucy-les-Pierrepont (11)
14.	Gouy FC (13)	0–9	US Chemin des Dames (11)
15.	US Aulnois-sous-Laon (11)	5–3	SC Flavy (12)
16.	AS Seraucourt-le-Grand (12)	2–3	US Anizy Pinon (12)
17.	FC Amigny-Rouy (13)	1–3 (Note: Tie reversed from original draw.)	FC Frières-Faillouël (13)
18.	FFC Chéry-lès-Pouilly (11)	1–2	SAS Moy de l'Aisne (10)
19.	FC Moncelien (12)	2–5	AS Nouvionnaise (12)
20.	ASFA Montbrehain (13)	2–0 (Note: CS Montescourt-Lizerolles penalised for fielding a suspended player.)	CS Montescourt-Lizerolles (13)
21.	AFC Holnon-Fayet (11)	8–0	US Brissy-Hamégicourt (12)
22.	SC Fontaine-Notre-Dame (13)	1–8	US Crépy Vivaise (12)
23.	FC Travecy (13)	0–7	Gauchy-Grugies Saint-Quentin FC (10)
24.	FC Lesdins (12)	0–1	US La Fère (10)
25.	ALJN Sinceny (12)	0–3	UES Vermand (10)
26.	Chambry FC (12)	4–2	RC Homblières (13)
27.	L'Arsenal Club Achery-Beautor-Charmes (11)	0–2	FC Essigny-le-Grand (10)
28.	AS Breny-Oulchy (12)	3–0 (Note: Tie won by means of forfeit.)	FC Gandelu Dammard (12)
29.	AS Pavant (12)	2–2 (4–2 p) (Note: AS Pavant penalised for fielding a suspended player. US Vallée de l'Ailette qualify.)	US Vallée de l'Ailette (11)
30.	US Venizel (11)	1–4	ES Ognes (10)
31.	RC Condé (12)	0–7	FC Vierzy (11)
32.	UA Fère-en-Tardenois (11)	1–3	CS Villeneuve Saint-Germain (10)
33.	ES Viry-Noureuil (12)	2–0	FC Abbécourt (13)
34.	Entente Crouy-Cuffies (11)	– (Note: Entente Crouy-Cuffies penalised for fielding a suspended player. Union Sud Aisne FC qualify. Original scoreline not known.)	Union Sud Aisne FC (12)
35.	Les Carlésiens FC (12)	5–1	FJEP Coincy (11)
36.	FC Billy-sur-Aisne (12)	2–3	FC Bucy-le-Long (11)
37.	FC Retz (13)	0–5	Septmonts OC (10)
38.	ASA Mont Notre-Dame (13)	1–14	US Belleu (11)
39.	ACSF Vic-sur-Aisne (13)	0–3	AS Milonaise Faverolles (10)
40.	BCV FC (10)	2–2 (4–3 p)	FC 3 Châteaux (10)

These matches are from the district of Oise, and were played on 25 August 2024.

First Round Results: Hauts-de-France (Oise)
Tie no	Home team (Tier)	Score	Away team (Tier)
1.	CSM Mesnil-en-Thelle (11)	2–1	AS Bornel (11)
2.	AFC Nogent-sur-Oise (12)	2–6	AS Ons-en-Bray (11)
3.	Fleury SL (12)	8–1	ÉC Villers/Bailleul (12)
4.	AS Saint-Remy-en-l'Eau (12)	0–3	AS Noailles-Cauvigny (10)
5.	ÉS Thiers-sur-Thève (11)	1–6 (Note: ÉS Thiers-sur-Thève penalised for fielding a suspended player. Hermes-Berthecourt AC qualify.)	Hermes-Berthecourt AC (9)
6.	AS Hénonville (11)	3–0	US Sainte-Geneviève (10)
7.	AF Trie-Château (12)	3–1	US Marseille-en-Beauvaisis (11)
8.	AJ Laboissière-en-Thelle (11)	0–3 (Note: Tie reversed from original draw.) (Note: Tie won by means of forfeit.)	AS Coye-la-Forêt (10)
9.	FC Jouy-sous-Thelle (13)	4–1	AS La Neuville-sur-Oudeuil (11)
10.	US Lamorlaye (10)	0–1	FC Saint-Just des Marais (10)
11.	FC Boran (11)	0–9	US Bresloise (9)
12.	RC Précy (11)	2–4	EFC Dieudonné Puiseux (11)
13.	CS Avilly-Saint-Léonard (9)	0–4	FC Esches Fosseuse (9)
14.	FC Talmontiers (12)	1–4	AS Verderel-lès-Sauqueuse (10)
15.	AS Cheminots Chambly (12)	3–4	FC Lavilletertre (11)
16.	FC Bellovaques (11)	1–1 (5–4 p)	US Crèvecœur-le-Grand (10)
17.	AC Compiègne (12)	3–1	US Verberie (10)
18.	AS Mareuil-sur-Ourcq (13)	1–2	AS Silly-le-Long (10)
19.	Rollot AC (12)	1–4 (Note: Rollot AC penalised for fielding a suspended player. AS Beaulieu Écuvilly qualify.)	AS Beaulieu Écuvilly (11)
20.	US Estrées-Saint-Denis (9)	2–2 (4–5 p)	JSA Compiègne-La Croix-Saint Ouen (9)
21.	US Baugy Monchy Humières (13)	3–1	FC Clairoix (12)
22.	US Attichy (13)	0–8	AS Multien (10)
23.	ASC Val d'Automne (13)	0–9	AS Orry-La-Chapelle-Plailly (10)
24.	US Thourotte Longueil (9)	0–4	Tricot OS (10)
25.	JS Guiscard (10)	2–0	AS Maignelay-Montigny (9)
26.	ES Compiègne (11)	1–1 (1–2 p)	FC Ruraville (10)
27.	FC Le Meux (12)	2–4	SC Lamotte Breuil (10)
28.	FC Salency (12)	3–4	CA Venette (9)
29.	Dynamo Canly Longueil (11)	2–2 (4–3 p)	US Villers-Saint-Paul (9)
30.	US Nanteuil FC (12)	3–1 (Note: FC Carlepont penalised for fielding a suspended player.)	FC Carlepont (11)
31.	ES Ormoy-Duvy (10)	2–0	FC Sacy-Saint Martin (10)
32.	AS Monchy-Saint-Éloi (11)	3–0	US Lieuvillers (10)
33.	ESC Wavignies (11)	0–6	ES Formerie (10)
34.	AS Campremy/Noyers (11)	2–0	US Saint-Germer-de-Fly (11)
35.	US Froissy (11)	0–6	FC Angy (10)
36.	US Fouquenies (13)	2–2 (5–4 p)	US Gaudechart (13)
37.	US Étouy-Agnetz-Bulles (9)	1–1 (5–4 p) (Note: US Étouy-Agnetz-Bulles penalised for fielding a suspended player. JS Thieux qualify.)	JS Thieux (10)
38.	JS Moliens (11)	0–7 (Note: JS Moliens penalised for fielding a suspended player.)	SC Songeons (9)
39.	FC Chiry Ourscamp (13)	2–5	ES Remy (11)
40.	AS Laigneville (13)	0–4	Stade Ressontois (9)
41.	FC Fontainettes Saint-Aubin (10)	1–1 (3–5 p)	USR Saint-Crépin-Ibouvillers (11)
42.	AS Montchevreuil (12)	2–2 (3–4 p)	Milly FC (12)
43.	FC Saint-Sulpice (12)	0–3	Grandvilliers AC (9)
44.	AS Herchies-Troissereux (13)	3–0	US Mouy (13)
45.	US Lassigny (9)	1–3	AS Saint-Sauveur La Croix Saint-Ouen (10)
46.	FC Bulles (12)	5–1	US Breuil-le-Sec (10)
47.	RC Blargies (12)	1–2	FC Saint-Paul (12)
48.	CS Haudivillers (11)	6–1 (Note: FC Nointel penalised for fielding a suspended player.)	FC Nointel (12)

These matches are from the district of Somme, and were played on 24 and 25 August 2024.

First Round Results: Hauts-de-France (Somme)
Tie no	Home team (Tier)	Score	Away team (Tier)
1.	US Vron (13)	2–3	SEP Blangy-Bouttencourt (11)
2.	Entente Sailly-Flibeaucourt Le Titre (12)	2–3	Avenir Nouvion-en-Ponthieu (10)
3.	Avenir de l'Étoile (12)	0–1	US Le Crotoy (11)
4.	AS Long (13)	0–4	Mers AC (11)
5.	Football Dreuillois (12)	3–0	Association Longpré-Long-Condé (12)
6.	AS Saint-Sauveur 80 (12)	3–2	US Béthencourt-sur-Mer (11)
7.	US Le Boisle (12)	2–4	US Lignières-Châtelain (10)
8.	US Quend (11)	2–0	ES Pigeonnier Amiens (10)
9.	JS Bourseville (14)	2–3	US Neuilly-l'Hôpital (11)
10.	AS Namps-Maisnil (11)	0–9	SC Flixecourt (9)
11.	FC Grand-Laviers (12)	0–4	SC Templiers Oisemont (10)
12.	AS Rue (13)	0–4	ES Harondel (11)
13.	AS Arrest (13)	0–1	AC Hallencourt (12)
14.	AS Menchecourt-Thuison-La Bouvaque (11)	0–3	CS Crécy-en-Ponthieu (10)
15.	AAE Feuquières-en-Vimeu (13)	2–4	ES Deux Vallées (10)
16.	SC Bernaville-Prouville (12)	3–3 (5–6 p)	AS Vismes au Val (12)
17.	CO Woignarue (11)	0–4	ES Chépy (10)
18.	JS Cambron (13)	0–4	FC Oisemont (10)
19.	ABC2F Candas (10)	2–3	Auxiloise (10)
20.	Olympique Belloy-sur-Somme (11)	2–2 (3–4 p)	ASIC Bouttencourt (10)
21.	AS Hautvillers-Ouville (13)	3–0	US Bouillancourt-en-Sery (13)
22.	AS Quesnoy-le-Montant (11)	3–1	FR Millencourt-en-Ponthieu (11)
23.	US Abbeville (11)	2–4	Olympique Eaucourtois (11)
24.	US Daours Vecquemont Bussy Aubigny (10)	4–0 (Note: Tie reversed from original draw.)	US Marcelcave (12)
25.	AS La Chaussée-Tirancourt (14)	1–9	ES Vers-sur-Selle (12)
26.	Olympique Mollienois (12)	4–2	US Flesselles (11)
27.	ASL Saveuse (13)	2–3	US Roisel (12)
28.	Boves SC (13)	3–6	FC Plessier (12)
29.	AS Heudicourt (13)	4–1	Rumigny FC (13)
30.	AS Prouzel-Plachy (12)	0–2	ASM Rivery (12)
31.	ES Sains/Saint-Fuscien (11)	1–1 (10–11 p)	US Ham (10)
32.	FC Grouches-Luchuel (14)	0–3 (Note: Tie won by means of forfeit.)	AS Glisy (10)
33.	AAE Bray-sur-Somme (13)	0–5	ASFR Ribemont Mericourt (11)
34.	US Allonville (13)	0–4	FC Pont de Metz (13)
35.	FC Estrées-Mons (12)	3–1	US Sailly-Saillisel (11)
36.	Amiens FC (12)	1–3	US Marchélepot (10)
37.	ES Licourt (12)	2–1	Olympique Monchy-Lagache (11)
38.	ES Cagny (10)	0–1	AS Querrieu (10)
39.	US Cartigny-Buire (13)	1–3	ES Sainte-Emilie/Épehy-le-Ronss (11)
40.	US Méricourt l'Abbé (13)	1–0	Fienvillers FC (13)
41.	AS Picquigny (13)	0–4	AS Cerisy (11)
42.	US Hangest-en-Serre (12)	2–1	Amiens AF (11)
43.	RC 2 Ercheu (13)	2–2 (3–2 p)	Olympique Le Hamel (10)
44.	FR Englebelmer (10)	1–2	CS Amiens Montières Étouvie (10)
45.	QCL Sud Amiénois (10)	1–4	Olympique Amiénois (10)
46.	Harbonnières SC (13)	6–1	Fraternelle Ailly-sur-Noye (11)

=== Second round ===
These matches are from the district of Artois, and were played on 1 September 2024, with one postponed to 8 September 2024 whilst awaiting the outcome of an investigation into a first round fixture.

Second Round Results: Hauts-de-France (Artois)
Tie no	Home team (Tier)	Score	Away team (Tier)
1.	AAE Évin-Malmaison (13)	0–10	US Nœux-les-Mines (7)
2.	US Mondicourt (14)	2–3	CS Habarcq (10)
3.	FC Beaumont (12)	1–5	USO Meurchin (8)
4.	AS Tincquizel (10)	0–3	ESD Isbergues (8)
5.	AS Lensoise (9)	1–1 (5–4 p)	AFCL Liebaut (8)
6.	SC Pro Patria Wingles (8)	2–2 (3–4 p)	USO Bruay-la-Buissière (8)
7.	AS Auchy-les-Mines (12)	0–7	AS Brebières (8)
8.	AS Maroeuil (10)	2–0	US Gonnehem-Chocques (11)
9.	Atrébate FC (12)	1–4	US Biachoise (7)
10.	Tilloy FC (13)	1–4	RC Vaudricourt Kennedy (11)
11.	AS Loison (10)	1–1 (4–1 p)	Espérance Calonne Liévin (8)
12.	Olympique La Comté Omnisport (15)	2–4	ES Ficheux (12)
13.	US Courcelles (8)	0–3	JS Écourt-Saint-Quentin (7)
14.	COS Marles-Lozinghem (9)	5–0	Olympique Héninois (9)
15.	FC Servins (13)	2–3	UAS Harnes (9)
16.	FC Camblain-Châtelain (11)	0–3	AAE Aix-Noulette (10)
17.	AS Barlin (12)	0–11	OS Aire-sur-la-Lys (7)
18.	AS Salomé (12)	1–4	Stade Héninois (10)
19.	La Couture FC (9)	1–5	FC Montigny-en-Gohelle (7)
20.	US Annezin (9)	4–1	AS Violaines (10)
21.	US Saint-Maurice Loos-en-Gohelle (9)	1–6	FC Lillers (8)
22.	US Lapugnoy (12)	3–2 (Note: Tie reversed from original draw.)	US Heuchin Lisbourg (13)
23.	ES Angres (9)	5–2	US Rouvroy (9)
24.	AS Frévent (12)	1–5	US Noyelles-sous-Lens (7)
25.	ES Sainte-Catherine (10)	0–2	US Vermelles (8)
26.	AS Lyssois (13)	0–3	AS Courrièrois (11)
27.	US Ablain (11)	0–5	Carabiniers Billy-Montigny (7)
28.	ES Val Sensée (13)	1–3	US Hesdigneul (11)
29.	US Arleux-en-Gohelle (12)	2–4	SC Fouquières (11)
30.	UC Divion (10)	1–1 (3–4 p)	Olympique Arras (10)
31.	Diables Rouges Lambres-lez-Aire (13)	0–16	US Saint-Pol-sur-Ternoise (8)
32.	AEP Verdrel (13)	1–4	AS Sainte-Barbe-Oignies (8)
33.	AS Bapaume-Bertincourt-Vaulx-Vraucourt (12)	2–1	US Monchy-au-Bois (9)
34.	AS Vallée de la Ternoise (11)	2–4	AJ Artois (12)
35.	ES Allouagne (12)	1–7	SC Artésien (9)
36.	ÉS Rœux (14)	0–6	US Pas-en-Artois (11)
37.	FC La Roupie-Isbergues (11)	0–3	Calonne-Ricouart FC Cite 6 (8)
38.	US Cheminots Avion (11)	0–5	SC Saint-Nicolas-lez-Arras (8)
39.	FC Givenchy-en-Gohelle (12)	2–1	US Ruch Carvin (12)
40.	AS Beaurains (12)	1–1 (7–6 p)	AJ Ruitz (13)
41.	CSAL Souchez (12)	1–11	ES Bully-les-Mines (7)
42.	AS Neuvireuil-Gavrelle (12)	3–1	USO Lens (9)
43.	US Lestrem (10)	1–3	RC Labourse (9)
44.	AS Vendin 2000 (13)	2–6	RC Sains (11)
45.	ÉS Saint-Laurent-Blangy-Feuchy (9)	1–6	CS Avion (7)
46.	Olympique Liévin (11)	4–1	CS Diana Liévin (9)
47.	FC Estevelles (13)	2–7	ES Labeuvrière (9)

These matches are from the district of Escaut, and were played on 1 September 2024.

Second Round Results: Hauts-de-France (Escaut)
Tie no	Home team (Tier)	Score	Away team (Tier)
1.	US Beaufort/Limont-Fontaine (9)	2–7	SA Le Quesnoy (9)
2.	SC Maubeuge (14)	3–0	US Sars-Poteries (13)
3.	SC Saint-Remy-du Nord (12)	0–2	Olympique Maroilles (9)
4.	US Cartignies (14)	0–6	AS Recquignies (11)
5.	US Cousolre (9)	4–3	ASG Louvroil (9)
6.	SCEPS Pont-sur-Sambre (12)	0–5	AG Solrézienne (10)
7.	FC Marpent (8)	2–1	US Rousies (9)
8.	US Gommegnies-Carnoy (11)	3–1	FC Avesnes-sur-Helpe (9)
9.	AS Hautmont (8)	2–0	US Berlaimont (8)
10.	US Fourmies (7)	3–0	US Bavay (8)
11.	FC Jenlain (13)	5–1	US Villers-Sire-Nicole (12)
12.	SC Bachant (13)	5–0	AS Étrœungt (13)
13.	AS La Longueville (11)	2–2 (5–4 p) (Note: Tie reversed from original draw.)	US Bousies Forest (12)
14.	IC Ferrière-la-Grande (10)	2–2 (2–3 p)	US Jeumont (9)
15.	US Les Rues-des-Vignes (11)	2–1	OM Cambrai Amérique (9)
16.	US Saint-Aubert (12)	1–6	CAS Escaudœuvres (8)
17.	AS Vendegies-Escarmain (11)	1–2	Entente Ligny/Olympique Caullery (9)
18.	US Saint-Souplet (12)	3–5	US Hordain (8)
19.	US Quievy (10)	1–3	FC Neuville-Saint-Rémy (11)
20.	ES Paillencourt-Estrun (11)	0–3	OC Avesnois (10)
21.	SCO Marquion Bourlon Épinoy (12)	2–5	FC Fontaine-au-Bois (10)
22.	FC Provillois (9)	1–4	ES Villers-Outréaux (7)
23.	ASE Metz-en-Couture (14)	1–2	US Fontaine-Notre-Dame (11)
24.	US Beauvois Fontaine (10)	2–2 (6–7 p)	SC Le Cateau (10)
25.	US Rumilly-en-Cambrésis (12)	4–4 (4–5 p)	Olympique Saint-Ollois (12)
26.	AS Masnières (11)	0–8	ES Caudry (7)
27.	Olympique Senséen (10)	4–1	FC Masny (9)
28.	US Pont Flers (10)	1–4	SC Douai (8)
29.	US Corbehem (10)	1–2	FC Férin (9)
30.	Dechy Sports (12)	3–3 (1–3 p)	AS Sin-le-Noble (9)
31.	US Auberchicourt (10)	1–7	Stade Orchésien (7)
32.	US Pays de Sensée et d'Ostrevent (12)	1–3	US Raimbeaucourt (10)
33.	RC Lécluse (11)	0–6	ESM Hamel (9)
34.	FC Bruille-lez-Marchiennes (13)	0–7	SC Aniche (9)
35.	FC Roost-Warendin (11)	0–0 (4–3 p)	FC Les Epis (9)
36.	US Pecquencourt (11)	0–3	AS Beuvry-la-Forêt (8)
37.	AEF Leforest (8)	4–2	Olympique Flinois (9)
38.	OSC Loffre (12)	2–2 (5–4 p)	US Erre-Hornaing (9)
39.	SC Guesnain (9)	0–5	ES Lambresienne (7)
40.	Olympique Marquette (13)	3–0	Olympic Marchiennois (11)
41.	AS Thivencelle (14)	6–4	Douchy FC (11)
42.	FC Saultain (13)	1–5	FC Condé-Macou (11)
43.	Saint-Saulve Football (10)	1–2	USM Marly (9)
44.	AS Summer Club Valenciennes (9)	4–1	US Aulnoy (8)
45.	FC Quarouble (9)	1–3	FC Raismes (7)
46.	ES Sebourg-Estreux (11)	1–2	Olympique Onnaingeois (9)
47.	AFC Escautpont (10)	5–3	Anzin FARC (11)
48.	US Lieu-Saint-Amand (14)	3–12	USM Beuvrages (12)
49.	RC Rœulx (10)	1–1 (3–4 p)	IC La Sentinelle (9)
50.	AS Château-l'Abbaye (11)	0–5	CO Trith-Saint-Léger (10)
51.	Inter Condé-sur-l'Escaut (12)	2–1	Neuville OSC (12)
52.	Saint-Waast CFC (12)	1–4 (Note: Bruay Sport penalised for fielding a suspended player. Saint-Waast CFC qualify.)	Bruay Sports (10)
53.	US Brillon (13)	0–3	ÉS Crespin (11)

These matches are from the district of Flandres, and were played on 1 September 2024.

Second Round Results: Hauts-de-France (Flandres)
Tie no	Home team (Tier)	Score	Away team (Tier)
1.	Football Saint-Michel Quesnoy (11)	1–3	SM Petite-Synthe (9)
2.	FC La Chapelle-d'Armentières (10)	1–5	USM Merville (8)
3.	CS EIC Tourcoing (11)	1–3	OSM Sequedin (8)
4.	US Estaires (11)	1–5	FC Madeleinois (9)
5.	Pont Rommel Football Hazebrouckois (12)	1–9	AG Thumeries (10)
6.	FC Méteren (10)	0–5	US Saint-André (7)
7.	Olympique Hémois FC (9)	2–1	USCC Saint-Pol-sur-Mer (8)
8.	AS Radinghem (10)	0–0 (5–3 p)	Mons AC (8)
9.	RC Herzeele (12)	0–4	Union Halluinoise (8)
10.	Leers OF (9)	0–2	EC Anstaing-Chéreng-Tressin-Gruson (8)
11.	Bac-Sailly Sports (11)	0–4	FC Annœullin (9)
12.	US Ascq (9)	2–1	Faches-Thumesnil FC (9)
13.	AS Jean Baptiste Roubaix (11)	1–8	UF Lambersart (7)
14.	US Houplin-Ancoisne (11)	0–1	US Marquette (8)
15.	Toufflers AF (10)	0–6	US Portugais Roubaix Tourcoing (7)
16.	SC Grand-Fort-Philippe (11)	4–3	CS Bousbecque (9)
17.	US Ronchin (9)	2–1	US Téteghem (9)
18.	AS Albeck Grande-Synthe (10)	2–2 (3–4 p)	AS Hellemmes (8)
19.	US Lille Moulins Carrel (9)	4–3	ES Roncq (8)
20.	SR Lomme Délivrance (9)	4–2	AO Sainghinoise (9)
21.	USF Coudekerque (10)	1–2	US Provin (7)
22.	FC Santes (11)	0–3	US Esquelbecq (7)
23.	FC Steene (11)	3–5	AS Dunkerque Sud (8)
24.	US Warhem (10)	1–2 (Note: Tie reversed from original draw.)	EAC Cysoing-Wannehain-Bourghelles (9)
25.	JS Ghyveldoise (10)	0–1	CG Haubourdin (8)
26.	US Monts de Flandre (9)	1–6	Verlinghem Foot (9)
27.	US Maritime (10)	0–10	RC Roubaix (7)
28.	EC Camphin-en-Pévèle (12)	0–10	FC Seclin (8)
29.	ES Ficheux (12)	3–0	FC Lille Sud (9)
30.	Olympique Mérignies (12)	2–6	FA Neuvilloise (7)
31.	Stade Lezennois (9)	4–0	CS Gondecourt (11)
32.	FC Bauvin (10)	4–4 (3–5 p)	JS Steenwerck (10)
33.	FC Rosendaël (10)	2–5	US Fretin (10)
34.	US Yser (10)	1–0	Fort-Mardyck OC (9)
35.	AS Saint-Joseph Hazebrouck (12)	1–5	Flers OS Villeneuve d'Ascq (9)
36.	US Pérenchies (9)	1–4	FC Dunkerque-Malo Plage (7)
37.	OS Fives (9)	2–2 (4–5 p)	ES Genech (8)
38.	ES Ennequin-Loos (10)	2–5	CS La Gorgue (8)
39.	AS Baisieux Patro (10)	0–7	US Lesquin (7)
40.	US Antillais Lille Métropole (11)	3–3 (2–4 p)	OC Roubaisien (11)
41.	FC Bierne (12)	0–8	JA Armentières (8)
42.	OSM Lomme (11)	0–5	FC Linselles (9)
43.	FC Morin (12)	0–3	SC Bailleulois (8)

These matches are from the district of Côte d'Opale, and were played on 1 September 2024.

Second Round Results: Hauts-de-France (Côte d'Opale)
Tie no	Home team (Tier)	Score	Away team (Tier)
1.	FC Wardrecques (9)	1–6	ES Calaisis Coulogne (8)
2.	Amicale Balzac (12)	7–1	AS Tournehem (10)
3.	JS Racquinghem (10)	0–2	Olympique Lumbrois (8)
4.	AS Esquerdes (13)	0–9	JS Longuenesse (8)
5.	US Humbert (14)	0–6	CA Éperlecques (9)
6.	FC Recques-sur-Hem (9)	2–1	FC Calais Caténa (10)
7.	FC Capellois (10)	2–0	US Quiestède (9)
8.	US Seninghem-Nielles-Vaudringhem (9)	0–3	Verton FC (9)
9.	US Alquines (12)	2–0	FC Ecques-Heuringhem (12)
10.	AS Audruicq (9)	4–1	ES Licques (10)
11.	USO Rinxent (9)	1–1 (4–3 p)	US Attin (9)
12.	Athletic Conteville Verte Vallée (13)	2–0	FC Merlimont (10)
13.	Le Portel GPF (13)	3–0	AS Portelois (14)
14.	US Blaringhem (9)	3–2	FC Campagne-lès-Guines (9)
15.	US Elinghen-Ferques (12)	1–3 (Note: Match abandoned in the 84th minute after an altercation between players of both teams. The league subsequently disqualified both teams from the competition.)	US Équihen-Plage (9)
16.	JS Bonningues-lès-Ardres (12)	3–1	JS Condette (13)
17.	AS Surques-Escœuilles (11)	2–5	AS Nortkerque 95 (9)
18.	RC Samer (11)	2–3	FCP Blendecques (9)
19.	Lys Aa FC (10)	1–2	Éclair Neufchâtel-Hardelot (9)
20.	US Brimeux (11)	0–14	US Marquise (9)
21.	ES Roquetoire (10)	0–0 (5–4 p)	AS Outreau (7)
22.	US Bourthes (9)	1–1 (5–3 p)	CO Wimille (9)
23.	FC Conti (11)	0–5	Olympique Saint-Martin Boulogne (9)
24.	CS Watten (9)	2–0	US Landrethun-le-Nord (10)
25.	ES Herbelles-Pihem-Inghem (13)	3–1	AS Fruges (11)
26.	ES Arques (9)	1–1 (2–4 p)	AS Étaples (7)
27.	AS Auchy-lès-Hesdin (12)	2–1	AC Tubersent (13)
28.	Amicale Pont-de-Briques (10)	1–1 (1–4 p)	AF Étaples Haute Ville (9)
29.	Nieurlet SL (15)	5–1	US Marais de Gûines (10)
30.	AS Maresquel (13)	1–23	Le Touquet AC (8)
31.	US Hesdin-l'Abbé (11)	2–2 (6–5 p)	AS Conchil-le-Temple (9)
32.	AS Campagne-lès-Hesdin (10)	0–7	Stade Portelois (7)
33.	FC Sangatte (10)	1–3	ES Beaurainville (10)
34.	ES Boisdinghem-Zudausques-Mentque-Nortbécourt (13)	0–8	SC Coquelles (7)
35.	Olympique Hesdin-Marconne (8)	1–1 (5–4 p)	Pays de la Lys (9)
36.	US Ambleteuse (10)	0–0 (4–3 p)	CAP Le Portel (11)
37.	AS Bezinghem (9)	0–4	AS Berck (8)
38.	FC Fréthun (11)	2–4	US Montreuil (8)
39.	FC Wavrans-sur-l'Aa (11)	0–3	AS Marck (7)
40.	ES Helfaut (11)	0–2	US Blériot-Plage (8)
41.	FC Les Attaques (12)	1–1 (6–5 p)	ES Saint-Omer Rural (9)
42.	ASL Vieil-Moutier La Calique (11)	0–5	JS Desvroise (9)
43.	AS Wimereux (8)	0–0 (2–4 p)	ES Saint-Léonard (8)

These matches are from the district of Aisne, and were played on 1 September 2024.

Second Round Results: Hauts-de-France (Aisne)
Tie no	Home team (Tier)	Score	Away team (Tier)
1.	FC Frières-Faillouël (13)	1–12	Gauchy-Grugies Saint-Quentin FC (10)
2.	FC Vaux-Andigny (12)	4–3	AFC Holnon-Fayet (11)
3.	US Origny Thenelles (12)	1–19	Écureuils Itancourt-Neuville (7)
4.	FC Fresnoy Fonsomme (10)	2–4	SC Origny-en-Thiérache (9)
5.	Marle Sports (11)	0–6	AS Beaurevoir (9)
6.	US Guise (10)	12–2	ES Montcornet (11)
7.	ASFA Montbrehain (13)	1–4	US Seboncourt (9)
8.	Stade Portugais Saint-Quentin (8)	0–3	US Ribemont Mezieres FC (8)
9.	FC Essigny-le-Grand (10)	2–0	US Rozoy-sur-Serre (11)
10.	Le Nouvion AC (11)	2–2 (4–2 p)	RC Bohain (9)
11.	AS Nouvionnaise (12)	1–0	AS Martigny (12)
12.	SAS Moy de l'Aisne (10)	5–0 (Note: Tie reversed from original draw.)	AS Tupigny (11)
13.	UES Vermand (10)	4–4 (4–2 p)	US Vervins (10)
14.	US Buire-Hirson-Thiérache (8)	3–1	Harly Quentin (9)
15.	US Anizy Pinon (12)	1–1 (4–5 p)	Chambry FC (12)
16.	AS Breny-Oulchy (12)	0–4 (Note: AS Breny-Oulchy penalised for fielding a suspended player.)	US Bruyères-et-Montbérault' (9)
17.	ES Viry-Noureuil (12)	1–7	IEC Château-Thierry (8)
18.	Les Carlésiens FC (12)	0–8	Internationale Soissonnaise (7)
19.	US La Fère (10)	2–1	FC Courmelles (9)
20.	ICS Créçois (10)	0–1	US Chauny (7)
21.	FC Vierzy (11)	2–3	BCV FC (10)
22.	Château Thierry-Etampes FC (9)	2–3 (Note: Château Thierry-Etampes FC penalised for fielding a suspended player.)	US Prémontré Saint-Gobain (9)
23.	CS Villeneuve Saint-Germain (10)	0–1	US Guignicourt (9)
24.	AS Milonaise Faverolles (10)	1–8	US Belleu (11)
25.	US Chemin des Dames (11)	4–1	US Crépy Vivaise (12)
26.	FC Bucy-le-Long (11)	0–5	Septmonts OC (10)
27.	US Vallée de l'Ailette (11)	2–2 (3–5 p)	US Aulnois-sous-Laon (11)
28.	Union Sud Aisne FC (12)	1–1 (2–4 p)	Tergnier FC (9)
29.	La Concorde de Bucy-les-Pierrepont (11)	2–2 (4–1 p)	ES Ognes (10)

These matches are from the district of Oise, and were played on 1 September 2024.

Second Round Results: Hauts-de-France (Oise)
Tie no	Home team (Tier)	Score	Away team (Tier)
1.	EFC Dieudonné Puiseux (11)	0–4	AS Noailles-Cauvigny (10)
2.	FC Esches Fosseuse (9)	0–3	US Nogent (7)
3.	CSM Mesnil-en-Thelle (11)	1–0	AS Auneuil (9)
4.	AS Ons-en-Bray (11)	0–3	Hermes-Berthecourt AC (9)
5.	FC Lavilletertre (11)	2–4	US Méru Sandricourt (7)
6.	FC Saint-Just des Marais (10)	3–0	Standard FC Montataire (8)
7.	Fleury SL (12)	1–0	AS Coye-la-Forêt (10)
8.	FC Jouy-sous-Thelle (13)	1–9	AS Verderel-lès-Sauqueuse (10)
9.	AF Trie-Château (12)	0–7	CS Chaumont-en-Vexin (7)
10.	AS Hénonville (11)	0–9	US Bresloise (9)
11.	FC Bellovaques (11)	0–3	USE Saint-Leu d'Esserent (9)
12.	US Cires-lès-Mello (8)	2–4	US Saint-Maximin (7)
13.	AS Multien (10)	7–0	AS Silly-le-Long (10)
14.	US Nanteuil FC (12)	0–6	US Crépy-en-Valois (8)
15.	AC Compiègne (12)	1–5	FCJ Noyon (8)
16.	AS Beaulieu Écuvilly (11)	2–2 (5–6 p)	ES Ormoy-Duvy (10)
17.	AS Verneuil-en-Halatte (9)	0–6	US Gouvieux (7)
18.	US Baugy Monchy Humières (13)	1–4	Dynamo Canly Longueil (11)
19.	SC Lamotte Breuil (10)	0–6	AFC Creil (8)
20.	CA Venette (9)	1–1 (5–4 p)	US Plessis-Brion (8)
21.	JSA Compiègne-La Croix-Saint Ouen (9)	0–1	USM Senlisienne (7)
22.	Tricot OS (10)	1–3	US Margny-lès-Compiègne (8)
23.	AS Orry-La-Chapelle-Plailly (10)	5–3	US Ribécourt (9)
24.	FC Ruraville (10)	1–0	JS Guiscard (10)
25.	AS Monchy-Saint-Éloi (11)	0–4	FC Béthisy (7)
26.	FC Liancourt-Clermont (7)	6–2	US Pont Sainte-Maxence (7)
27.	USR Saint-Crépin-Ibouvillers (11)	0–7	Stade Ressontois (9)
28.	JS Thieux (10)	4–1	AS Allonne (9)
29.	ES Remy (11)	2–2 (5–3 p)	FC Saint-Paul (12)
30.	SC Songeons (9)	1–5	SC Saint-Just-en-Chaussée (8)
31.	AS Saint-Sauveur La Croix Saint-Ouen (10)	0–12	US Balagny-Saint-Epin (8)
32.	CS Haudivillers (11)	0–5	US Breteuil (7)
33.	US Fouquenies (13)	0–5	FC Angy (10)
34.	US ASPTT Portugais Beauvais (8)	0–1	US Chevrières-Grandfresnoy (7)
35.	FC Bulles (12)	3–1 (Note: Tie reversed from original draw.)	Milly FC (12)
36.	AS Herchies-Troissereux (13)	2–4	ES Formerie (10)
37.	AS Campremy/Noyers (11)	1–2	Grandvilliers AC (9)

These matches are from the district of Somme, and were played on 1 September 2024.

Second Round Results: Hauts-de-France (Somme)
Tie no	Home team (Tier)	Score	Away team (Tier)
1.	Amiens RIF (9)	2–4	FC Ailly-sur-Somme Samara (9)
2.	ES Chépy (10)	6–2	AS Quesnoy-le-Montant (11)
3.	ASIC Bouttencourt (10)	2–1	FC Mareuil-Caubert Huchenneville (9)
4.	Olympique Eaucourtois (11)	5–0	US Neuilly-l'Hôpital (11)
5.	AC Hallencourt (12)	0–2	Auxiloise (10)
6.	Avenir Nouvion-en-Ponthieu (10)	0–1	AS Airaines-Allery (9)
7.	ES Harondel (11)	1–5	SC Abbeville (7)
8.	SC Flixecourt (9)	4–2	US Friville-Escarbotin (9)
9.	AS Vismes au Val (12)	0–3	CS Crécy-en-Ponthieu (10)
10.	SEP Blangy-Bouttencourt (11)	1–2	AS Gamaches (8)
11.	SC Templiers Oisemont (10)	1–6	SC Pont-Remy (9)
12.	US Nibas Fressenneville (9)	1–3	JS Miannay-Moyenneville-Lambercourt (8)
13.	US Le Crotoy (11)	0–5	FC Centulois (9)
14.	Football Dreuillois (12)	0–6	RC Doullens (8)
15.	US Quend (11)	0–7	Poix-Blangy-Croixrault FC (9)
16.	CS Amiens Montières Étouvie (10)	6–0	ES Deux Vallées (10)
17.	AS Hautvillers-Ouville (13)	0–9	FC Saint-Valéry Baie de Somme Sud (9)
18.	Mers AC (11)	0–0 (1–4 p)	FC Oisemont (10)
19.	US Ham (10)	2–4	US Ouvriere Albert (8)
20.	ASFR Ribemont Mericourt (11)	1–5	FC La Montoye (9)
21.	AS Cerisy (11)	2–1	AS Querrieu (10)
22.	Harbonnières SC (13)	3–1	US Rosières (9)
23.	AS Villers-Bretonneux (9)	0–4	AAE Chaulnes (9)
24.	ES Licourt (12)	3–0	AS Heudicourt (13)
25.	Olympique Mollienois (12)	1–3	US Daours Vecquemont Bussy Aubigny (10)
26.	FC Plessier (12)	3–5	AS Saint-Sauveur 80 (12)
27.	FC Pont de Metz (13)	1–8	US Marchélepot (10)
28.	Olympique Amiénois (10)	3–1	SC Moreuil (9)
29.	FC Estrées-Mons (12)	3–1	US Hangest-en-Serre (12)
30.	RC 2 Ercheu (13)	0–15	RC Amiens (8)
31.	Entente CAFC Péronne (9)	1–0	AS Glisy (10)
32.	ES Sainte-Emilie/Épehy-le-Ronss (11)	3–2	Montdidier AC (8)
33.	US Lignières-Châtelain (10)	0–3	RC Salouël Saleux (8)
34.	ES Vers-sur-Selle (12)	0–6	AS du Pays Neslois (8)
35.	ASM Rivery (12)	0–6	FC Méaulte (9)
36.	US Roisel (12)	2–2 (3–0 p)	US Méricourt l'Abbé (13)

=== Third round ===
These matches were played on 14 and 15 September 2024.

Third Round Results: Hauts-de-France
Tie no	Home team (Tier)	Score	Away team (Tier)
1.	CA Venette (9)	1–1 (5–4 p)	Olympique Senséen (10)
2.	Saint-Waast CFC (12)	2–11	CS Avion (7)
3.	Olympique Amiénois (10)	1–0	US Chevrières-Grandfresnoy (7)
4.	ES Villers-Outréaux (7)	3–5	US Maubeuge (6)
5.	Olympique Marquette (13)	0–2	US Gommegnies-Carnoy (11)
6.	ES Sainte-Emilie/Épehy-le-Ronss (11)	0–3	AS Beaurevoir (9)
7.	SC Origny-en-Thiérache (9)	0–1	US Buire-Hirson-Thiérache (8)
8.	US Fourmies (7)	0–5	US Vimy (5)
9.	AS Summer Club Valenciennes (9)	1–1 (5–4 p)	ES Anzin-Saint-Aubin (6)
10.	Auxiloise (10)	1–4	UES Vermand (10)
11.	AS Multien (10)	3–5	Écureuils Itancourt-Neuville (7)
12.	FC Angy (10)	4–0	ES Remy (11)
13.	OSC Loffre (12)	0–0 (4–5 p)	USE Saint-Leu d'Esserent (9)
14.	US Roisel (12)	2–1	FC Vaux-Andigny (12)
15.	Harbonnières SC (13)	0–5	US Crépy-en-Valois (8)
16.	US Ouvriere Albert (8)	0–1	AS Hautmont (8)
17.	US Margny-lès-Compiègne (8)	0–1	Olympique Saint-Quentin (5)
18.	US Marchélepot (10)	1–0	US Guise (10)
19.	FC La Montoye (9)	1–1 (6–5 p)	AS du Pays Neslois (8)
20.	Entente CAFC Péronne (9)	0–2	AFC Compiègne (6)
21.	US Méru Sandricourt (7)	2–3	US Escaudain Denain (6)
22.	AS Nouvionnaise (12)	0–6	AS La Longueville (11)
23.	Internationale Soissonnaise (7)	4–4 (1–3 p)	AFC Creil (8)
24.	Stade Ressontois (9)	2–0	FC Marpent (8)
25.	SAS Moy de l'Aisne (10)	1–5	USO Meurchin (8)
26.	SC Saint-Just-en-Chaussée (8)	0–1	US Saint-Maximin (7)
27.	Dynamo Canly Longueil (11)	1–0	ES Licourt (12)
28.	AS Thivencelle (14)	1–5	US Daours Vecquemont Bussy Aubigny (10)
29.	AS Orry-La-Chapelle-Plailly (10)	1–1 (3–2 p)	AS Sainte-Barbe-Oignies (8)
30.	ES Ormoy-Duvy (10)	0–1	AAE Chaulnes (9)
31.	FC Méaulte (9)	1–0	CS Amiens Montières Étouvie (10)
32.	FC Béthisy (7)	4–1	US Chauny (7)
33.	AS Cerisy (11)	3–1	USM Marly (9)
34.	FC Ruraville (10)	0–3	US Laon (7)
35.	Gauchy-Grugies Saint-Quentin FC (10)	5–2	FC Essigny-le-Grand (10)
36.	FC Estrées-Mons (12)	0–0 (6–7 p)	Le Nouvion AC (11)
37.	US Ribemont Mezieres FC (8)	8–0	US Seboncourt (9)
38.	SC Bachant (13)	0–7	AC Cambrai (6)
39.	US Raimbeaucourt (10)	5–1	La Concorde de Bucy-les-Pierrepont (11)
40.	AS Airaines-Allery (9)	0–3	USM Senlisienne (7)
41.	US Aulnois-sous-Laon (11)	1–1 (4–3 p)	FC Givenchy-en-Gohelle (12)
42.	Calonne-Ricouart FC Cite 6 (8)	1–2	Olympique Maroilles (9)
43.	USM Beuvrages (12)	0–5	AS Loison (10)
44.	US Bruyères-et-Montbérault' (9)	0–1	SC Pont-Remy (9)
45.	JS Thieux (10)	2–4	JS Miannay-Moyenneville-Lambercourt (8)
46.	ES Caudry (7)	3–2	IEC Château-Thierry (8)
47.	US Hordain (8)	3–0	RC Doullens (8)
48.	ES Formerie (10)	1–3	US Saint-Pol-sur-Ternoise (8)
49.	RC Vaudricourt Kennedy (11)	1–0	US Bresloise (9)
50.	SC Le Cateau (10)	1–0	US Roye-Noyon (6)
51.	FC Saint-Just des Marais (10)	1–2	Olympique Hesdin-Marconne (8)
52.	CSM Mesnil-en-Thelle (11)	0–6	US Noyelles-sous-Lens (7)
53.	US Lapugnoy (12)	2–1	ASIC Bouttencourt (10)
54.	SC Maubeuge (14)	0–6	US Annezin (9)
55.	ES Labeuvrière (9)	0–0 (1–2 p)	US Breteuil (7)
56.	CS Crécy-en-Ponthieu (10)	1–2	US Hesdigneul (11)
57.	AS Saint-Sauveur 80 (12)	0–4	US Prémontré Saint-Gobain (9)
58.	FC Ailly-sur-Somme Samara (9)	3–0 (Note: Tie reversed from original draw.)	FC Bulles (12)
59.	Olympique Eaucourtois (11)	1–3	US Nogent (7)
60.	COS Marles-Lozinghem (9)	0–5	US Le Pays du Valois (5)
61.	AS Recquignies (11)	0–4	US Gouvieux (7)
62.	Hermes-Berthecourt AC (9)	2–1	BCV FC (10)
63.	Poix-Blangy-Croixrault FC (9)	0–3	US Choisy-au-Bac (6)
64.	ÉS Crespin (11)	1–1 (9–10 p)	Tergnier FC (9)
65.	Grandvilliers AC (9)	0–1	FC Liancourt-Clermont (7)
66.	FC Centulois (9)	1–0	CS Chaumont-en-Vexin (7)
67.	FC Fontaine-au-Bois (10)	3–9	ESC Longueau (6)
68.	US Camon (6)	1–2	Saint-Amand FC (6)
69.	Chambry FC (12)	0–5	US Guignicourt (9)
70.	FC Oisemont (10)	1–1 (4–3 p)	US La Fère (10)
71.	Fleury SL (12)	2–4	FC Saint-Valéry Baie de Somme Sud (9)
72.	AAE Aix-Noulette (10)	2–3	RC Salouël Saleux (8)
73.	US Chemin des Dames (11)	0–5	FC Porto Portugais Amiens (6)
74.	US Montreuil (8)	1–0	Carabiniers Billy-Montigny (7)
75.	US Belleu (11)	1–1 (5–4 p)	ES Chépy (10)
76.	FCJ Noyon (8)	0–0 (7–8 p)	FC Montigny-en-Gohelle (7)
77.	Septmonts OC (10)	1–3	AS Gamaches (8)
78.	US Jeumont (9)	1–3	US Balagny-Saint-Epin (8)
79.	AS Verderel-lès-Sauqueuse (10)	1–2	US Biachoise (7)
80.	RC Amiens (8)	2–1	US Cousolre (9)
81.	AS Noailles-Cauvigny (10)	0–0 (3–2 p)	SC Flixecourt (9)
82.	AS Maroeuil (10)	0–1	US Esquelbecq (7)
83.	SC Grand-Fort-Philippe (11)	0–4	SC Coquelles (7)
84.	AS Auchy-lès-Hesdin (12)	3–3 (2–4 p)	ES Beaurainville (10)
85.	Olympique Lumbrois (8)	1–5	US Tourcoing FC (6)
86.	SC Artésien (9)	0–1	IC La Sentinelle (9)
87.	AS Radinghem (10)	0–0 (4–2 p)	SC Hazebrouck (6)
88.	ES Saint-Léonard (8)	1–0	ES Calaisis Coulogne (8)
89.	US Pas-en-Artois (11)	0–0 (4–3 p)	US Nœux-les-Mines (7)
90.	US Hesdin-l'Abbé (11)	2–3	SC Bailleulois (8)
91.	AFC Escautpont (10)	1–4	AS Dunkerque Sud (8)
92.	USM Merville (8)	0–3	Le Touquet AC (8)
93.	SC Aniche (9)	5–0	AS Brebières (8)
94.	US Bourthes (9)	0–6	Olympique Grande-Synthe (6)
95.	JS Bonningues-lès-Ardres (12)	1–4	FA Neuvilloise (7)
96.	Éclair Neufchâtel-Hardelot (9)	4–1	Olympique Onnaingeois (9)
97.	Arras FA (6)	8–0	Inter Condé-sur-l'Escaut (12)
98.	JS Steenwerck (10)	0–2	FC Seclin (8)
99.	CS Habarcq (10)	1–4	US Gravelines (6)
100.	FC Lillers (8)	2–3	Olympique Marcquois Football (6)
101.	Verton FC (9)	0–3	US Lille Moulins Carrel (9)
102.	ES Bully-les-Mines (7)	7–1	US Marquette (8)
103.	US Ronchin (9)	0–8	US Pays de Cassel (5)
104.	Olympique Hémois FC (9)	1–3	RC Roubaix (7)
105.	US Vermelles (8)	3–4	ES Lambresienne (7)
106.	AS Bapaume-Bertincourt-Vaulx-Vraucourt (12)	0–3	UF Lambersart (7)
107.	US Alquines (12)	2–2 (4–5 p)	Olympique Saint-Martin Boulogne (9)
108.	SA Le Quesnoy (9)	0–3	FC Madeleinois (9)
109.	US Les Rues-des-Vignes (11)	0–4	JS Longuenesse (8)
110.	SM Petite-Synthe (9)	2–2 (3–1 p)	ES Angres (9)
111.	AF Étaples Haute Ville (9)	1–1 (6–5 p)	CO Trith-Saint-Léger (10)
112.	US Provin (7)	1–9	US Blériot-Plage (8)
113.	EC Anstaing-Chéreng-Tressin-Gruson (8)	2–1	JS Desvroise (9)
114.	Athletic Conteville Verte Vallée (13)	0–2	US Ascq (9)
115.	FC Raismes (7)	2–2 (4–1 p)	AS Berck (8)
116.	Le Portel GPF (13)	0–4	CG Haubourdin (8)
117.	AJ Artois (12)	1–1 (5–4 p)	FC Annœullin (9)
118.	USO Rinxent (9)	0–5	Iris Club de Croix (5)
119.	AG Thumeries (10)	10–0	FC Roost-Warendin (11)
120.	US Marquise (9)	1–2	ES Genech (8)
121.	RC Sains (11)	–	Bye (Note: Both teams from the second round tie were disqualified, and RC Sains were awarded a bye.)
122.	Olympique Saint-Ollois (12)	0–4	ES Ficheux (12)
123.	ES Mouvaux (9)	1–3	OS Aire-sur-la-Lys (7)
124.	CA Éperlecques (9)	3–0	Stade Portelois (7)
125.	ES Herbelles-Pihem-Inghem (13)	0–7	CAS Escaudœuvres (8)
126.	SC Abbeville (7)	2–2 (3–4 p)	AS Étaples (7)
127.	OSM Sequedin (8)	4–1	FC Condé-Macou (11)
128.	FC Linselles (9)	0–3	Entente Ligny/Olympique Caullery (9)
129.	US Saint-André (7)	1–1 (0–2 p)	Bondues FC (6)
130.	AS Nortkerque 95 (9)	0–2	US Portugais Roubaix Tourcoing (7)
131.	AS Beaurains (12)	1–1 (4–2 p)	Union Halluinoise (8)
132.	FC Dunkerque-Malo Plage (7)	3–1	AS Steenvorde (6)
133.	RC Labourse (9)	2–0	CS Watten (9)
134.	Stade Héninois (10)	1–0	FC Neuville-Saint-Rémy (11)
135.	US Fontaine-Notre-Dame (11)	0–1	AS Neuvireuil-Gavrelle (12)
136.	AG Solrézienne (10)	2–0	SC Fouquières (11)
137.	FC Jenlain (13)	1–2	Olympique Arras (10)
138.	EAC Cysoing-Wannehain-Bourghelles (9)	1–0	US Yser (10)
139.	UAS Harnes (9)	1–3	FC Capellois (10)
140.	US Fretin (10)	4–1	US Ambleteuse (10)
141.	OC Roubaisien (11)	1–5	Flers OS Villeneuve d'Ascq (9)
142.	Nieurlet SL (15)	1–2	ES Roquetoire (10)
143.	AS Marck (7)	0–1	RC Calais (5)
144.	FC Loon-Plage (6)	2–2 (2–4 p)	Stade Béthunois (6)
145.	ESM Hamel (9)	1–1 (3–4 p)	AEF Leforest (8)
146.	AS Beuvry-la-Forêt (8)	0–3	Stade Lezennois (9)
147.	Verlinghem Foot (9)	0–5	Stade Orchésien (7)
148.	AS Sin-le-Noble (9)	2–1	SC Saint-Nicolas-lez-Arras (8)
149.	FC Les Attaques (12)	0–2	SC Douai (8)
150.	FCP Blendecques (9)	1–2	US Blaringhem (9)
151.	US Lesquin (7)	0–0 (1–4 p)	USO Bruay-la-Buissière (8)
152.	AS Audruicq (9)	0–4	US Saint-Omer (6)
153.	AS Lensoise (9)	1–3	JS Écourt-Saint-Quentin (7)
154.	Olympique Liévin (11)	2–3	AS Hellemmes (8)
155.	Amicale Balzac (12)	2–5	CS La Gorgue (8)
156.	OC Avesnois (10)	1–2	ESD Isbergues (8)
157.	JA Armentières (8)	2–4	Calais Beau-Marais (6)
158.	AS Courrièrois (11)	0–1	SR Lomme Délivrance (9)
159.	FC Férin (9)	0–2	FC Recques-sur-Hem (9)

=== Fourth round ===
These matches were played on 28 and 29 September 2024.

Fourth Round Results: Hauts-de-France
Tie no	Home team (Tier)	Score	Away team (Tier)
1.	AS Orry-La-Chapelle-Plailly (10)	2–1	FC Oisemont (10)
2.	US Marchélepot (10)	0–3	Olympique Saint-Quentin (5)
3.	Olympique Hesdin-Marconne (8)	0–1	US Le Pays du Valois (5)
4.	SC Le Cateau (10)	3–1	US Belleu (11)
5.	Dynamo Canly Longueil (11)	0–5	US Nogent (7)
6.	US Balagny-Saint-Epin (8)	1–1 (2–4 p)	US Laon (7)
7.	Le Nouvion AC (11)	2–1	AS Noailles-Cauvigny (10)
8.	FC La Montoye (9)	0–2	ESC Longueau (6)
9.	AAE Chaulnes (9)	0–2	AS Beauvais Oise (4)
10.	FC Angy (10)	0–1	US Crépy-en-Valois (8)
11.	FC Méaulte (9)	0–1	USM Senlisienne (7)
12.	FC Liancourt-Clermont (7)	1–0	US Ribemont Mezieres FC (8)
13.	AS Beaurevoir (9)	1–1 (5–3 p)	US Prémontré Saint-Gobain (9)
14.	Gauchy-Grugies Saint-Quentin FC (10)	1–2	Stade Ressontois (9)
15.	AS Gamaches (8)	1–1 (4–3 p)	RC Salouël Saleux (8)
16.	AS Cerisy (11)	0–6	ES Caudry (7)
17.	AFC Creil (8)	4–0	Tergnier FC (9)
18.	AS Hautmont (8)	4–1	SC Pont-Remy (9)
19.	Hermes-Berthecourt AC (9)	1–0	FC Béthisy (7)
20.	US Choisy-au-Bac (6)	3–2	Écureuils Itancourt-Neuville (7)
21.	US Aulnois-sous-Laon (11)	0–1	JS Miannay-Moyenneville-Lambercourt (8)
22.	RC Amiens (8)	1–3	FC Porto Portugais Amiens (6)
23.	USE Saint-Leu d'Esserent (9)	0–3	AFC Compiègne (6)
24.	AC Cambrai (6)	0–1	FC Chambly Oise (4)
25.	UES Vermand (10)	1–4	US Breteuil (7)
26.	US Buire-Hirson-Thiérache (8)	0–2	US Guignicourt (9)
27.	US Roisel (12)	0–4	US Gouvieux (7)
28.	CA Venette (9)	0–3	US Saint-Maximin (7)
29.	US Hordain (8)	5–0	FC Ailly-sur-Somme Samara (9)
30.	Olympique Maroilles (9)	2–2 (7–6 p)	US Montreuil (8)
31.	Olympique Arras (10)	3–5	USO Meurchin (8)
32.	ES Beaurainville (10)	0–3	SC Douai (8)
33.	AS Loison (10)	1–3	FC Raismes (7)
34.	CAS Escaudœuvres (8)	1–1 (5–3 p)	Olympique Marcquois Football (6)
35.	EC Anstaing-Chéreng-Tressin-Gruson (8)	0–0 (4–3 p)	US Escaudain Denain (6)
36.	AS La Longueville (11)	0–1	Stade Lezennois (9)
37.	AS Neuvireuil-Gavrelle (12)	0–0 (3–4 p)	US Daours Vecquemont Bussy Aubigny (10)
38.	AS Summer Club Valenciennes (9)	0–1	CS Avion (7)
39.	FC Saint-Valéry Baie de Somme Sud (9)	0–3	USO Bruay-la-Buissière (8)
40.	AJ Artois (12)	0–11	US Maubeuge (6)
41.	AG Solrézienne (10)	0–3	US Noyelles-sous-Lens (7)
42.	FC Centulois (9)	0–2	ES Bully-les-Mines (7)
43.	Olympique Amiénois (10)	1–4	ES Lambresienne (7)
44.	US Annezin (9)	2–1	JS Écourt-Saint-Quentin (7)
45.	Entente Ligny/Olympique Caullery (9)	1–1 (3–4 p)	'AS Sin-le-Noble (9)
46.	US Pas-en-Artois (11)	1–1 (6–5 p)	US Saint-Pol-sur-Ternoise (8)
47.	Stade Orchésien (7)	1–1 (3–4 p)	US Chantilly (4)
48.	ES Saint-Léonard (8)	0–3	Stade Béthunois (6)
49.	Éclair Neufchâtel-Hardelot (9)	0–7	US Vimy (5)
50.	AF Étaples Haute Ville (9)	0–2	Entente Feignies Aulnoye FC (4)
51.	AEF Leforest (8)	1–2	RC Labourse (9)
52.	US Lapugnoy (12)	0–12	Arras FA (6)
53.	RC Sains (11)	0–2	Saint-Amand FC (6)
54.	SC Aniche (9)	3–2	US Biachoise (7)
55.	FC Montigny-en-Gohelle (7)	2–2 (3–4 p)	Iris Club de Croix (5)
56.	US Gommegnies-Carnoy (11)	0–3	US Tourcoing FC (6)
57.	AS Dunkerque Sud (8)	1–3	US Saint-Omer (6)
58.	IC La Sentinelle (9)	0–2	SC Bailleulois (8)
59.	FC Recques-sur-Hem (9)	0–0 (3–2 p)	US Portugais Roubaix Tourcoing (7)
60.	AS Hellemmes (8)	1–4	JS Longuenesse (8)
61.	Olympique Saint-Martin Boulogne (9)	0–1	US Ascq (9)
62.	FC Capellois (10)	1–1 (4–3 p)	AG Thumeries (10)
63.	US Gravelines (6)	1–1 (6–7 p)	Calais Beau-Marais (6)
64.	RC Roubaix (7)	1–1 (3–2 p)	Bondues FC (6)
65.	CA Éperlecques (9)	0–3	RC Calais (5)
66.	CG Haubourdin (8)	1–1 (7–6 p)	Olympique Grande-Synthe (6)
67.	US Lille Moulins Carrel (9)	4–2	Stade Héninois (10)
68.	RC Vaudricourt Kennedy (11)	0–2	US Esquelbecq (7)
69.	US Hesdigneul (11)	1–3	Le Touquet AC (8)
70.	AS Beaurains (12)	2–5	AS Étaples (7)
71.	UF Lambersart (7)	2–0	CS La Gorgue (8)
72.	ES Genech (8)	1–1 (1–0 p)	US Blériot-Plage (8)
73.	AS Radinghem (10)	2–2 (5–3 p)	OSM Sequedin (8)
74.	ES Ficheux (12)	1–4	EAC Cysoing-Wannehain-Bourghelles (9)
75.	US Raimbeaucourt (10)	0–2	FC Seclin (8)
76.	SR Lomme Délivrance (9)	6–1	US Fretin (10)
77.	FC Madeleinois (9)	4–3	SM Petite-Synthe (9)
78.	ESD Isbergues (8)	0–0 (3–5 p)	Flers OS Villeneuve d'Ascq (9)
79.	OS Aire-sur-la-Lys (7)	1–3	FC Dunkerque-Malo Plage (7)
80.	SC Coquelles (7)	0–3	US Pays de Cassel (5)
81.	US Blaringhem (9)	1–2	Wasquehal Football (4)
82.	ES Roquetoire (10)	0–3	FA Neuvilloise (7)

=== Fifth round ===
These matches were played on 12 and 13 October 2024.

Fifth Round Results: Hauts-de-France
Tie no	Home team (Tier)	Score	Away team (Tier)
1.	AS Radinghem (10)	1–3	RC Calais (5)
2.	AS Gamaches (8)	0–3	US Boulogne (3)
3.	Arras FA (6)	1–0	US Breteuil (7)
4.	AS Étaples (7)	1–1 (4–2 p)	USO Bruay-la-Buissière (8)
5.	SC Bailleulois (8)	0–3	FC Liancourt-Clermont (7)
6.	US Chantilly (4)	1–1 (3–1 p)	FC Chambly Oise (4)
7.	AS Orry-La-Chapelle-Plailly (10)	0–0 (1–4 p)	ES Genech (8)
8.	Le Touquet AC (8)	5–2	AFC Creil (8)
9.	Flers OS Villeneuve d'Ascq (9)	0–2	EAC Cysoing-Wannehain-Bourghelles (9)
10.	Hermes-Berthecourt AC (9)	2–3	FC Recques-sur-Hem (9)
11.	US Annezin (9)	0–2	Stade Béthunois (6)
12.	US Saint-Omer (6)	1–0	US Esquelbecq (7)
13.	SR Lomme Délivrance (9)	2–1	US Nogent (7)
14.	JS Longuenesse (8)	0–0 (5–3 p)	ESC Longueau (6)
15.	US Daours Vecquemont Bussy Aubigny (10)	2–0	US Pas-en-Artois (11)
16.	JS Miannay-Moyenneville-Lambercourt (8)	2–4	Calais Beau-Marais (6)
17.	Stade Lezennois (9)	0–4	US Le Pays du Valois (5)
18.	FC Dunkerque-Malo Plage (7)	0–1	US Vimy (5)
19.	US Ascq (9)	2–2 (1–3 p)	USM Senlisienne (7)
20.	US Lille Moulins Carrel (9)	0–2	US Saint-Maximin (7)
21.	US Gouvieux (7)	1–3	FC Porto Portugais Amiens (6)
22.	AS Sin-le-Noble (9)	2–0	FC Madeleinois (9)
23.	FC Seclin (8)	2–1	US Choisy-au-Bac (6)
24.	FC Raismes (7)	2–1	US Maubeuge (6)
25.	FA Neuvilloise (7)	0–2	US Tourcoing FC (6)
26.	USO Meurchin (8)	2–3	US Laon (7)
27.	Wasquehal Football (4)	2–2 (2–4 p)	Olympique Saint-Quentin (5)
28.	Olympique Maroilles (9)	1–1 (5–4 p)	ES Caudry (7)
29.	SC Douai (8)	2–2 (2–3 p)	CAS Escaudœuvres (8)
30.	US Crépy-en-Valois (8)	1–1 (5–4 p)	UF Lambersart (7)
31.	US Guignicourt (9)	1–1 (6–7 p)	CG Haubourdin (8)
32.	AFC Compiègne (6)	0–3	Valenciennes FC (3)
33.	FC Capellois (10)	1–3	RC Roubaix (7)
34.	Stade Ressontois (9)	2–2 (3–5 p)	US Noyelles-sous-Lens (7)
35.	SC Aniche (9)	0–3	Entente Feignies Aulnoye FC (4)
36.	RC Labourse (9)	2–0	SC Le Cateau (10)
37.	AS Beaurevoir (9)	0–2	US Pays de Cassel (5)
38.	ES Bully-les-Mines (7)	2–4	AS Beauvais Oise (4)
39.	ES Lambresienne (7)	0–0 (4–5 p)	EC Anstaing-Chéreng-Tressin-Gruson (8)
40.	US Hordain (8)	2–1	Saint-Amand FC (6)
41.	Le Nouvion AC (11)	1–3	AS Hautmont (8)
42.	CS Avion (7)	0–1	Iris Club de Croix (5)

=== Sixth round ===
These matches were played on 26 and 27 October 2024.

Sixth Round Results: Hauts-de-France
Tie no	Home team (Tier)	Score	Away team (Tier)
1.	FC Seclin (8)	2–4	Arras FA (6)
2.	FC Raismes (7)	0–0 (4–3 p)	US Le Pays du Valois (5)
3.	EC Anstaing-Chéreng-Tressin-Gruson (8)	1–1 (3–2 p)	SR Lomme Délivrance (9)
4.	US Noyelles-sous-Lens (7)	3–0	CAS Escaudœuvres (8)
5.	USM Senlisienne (7)	0–3	Stade Béthunois (6)
6.	Iris Club de Croix (5)	3–3 (3–4 p)	Valenciennes FC (3)
7.	RC Roubaix (7)	2–2 (3–1 p)	ES Genech (8)
8.	US Vimy (5)	1–1 (4–5 p)	US Chantilly (4)
9.	JS Longuenesse (8)	1–1 (1–3 p)	US Crépy-en-Valois (8)
10.	AS Sin-le-Noble (9)	0–4	AS Beauvais Oise (4)
11.	US Saint-Maximin (7)	0–1	US Saint-Omer (6)
12.	US Pays de Cassel (5)	2–1	US Tourcoing FC (6)
13.	RC Labourse (9)	0–0 (3–1 p)	AS Étaples (7)
14.	FC Liancourt-Clermont (7)	3–1	US Laon (7)
15.	AS Hautmont (8)	0–6	Entente Feignies Aulnoye FC (4)
16.	US Hordain (8)	0–1	Calais Beau-Marais (6)
17.	Olympique Maroilles (9)	1–3	FC Porto Portugais Amiens (6)
18.	US Daours Vecquemont Bussy Aubigny (10)	0–5	RC Calais (5)
19.	EAC Cysoing-Wannehain-Bourghelles (9)	0–5	US Boulogne (3)
20.	FC Recques-sur-Hem (9)	0–2	CG Haubourdin (8)
21.	Le Touquet AC (8)	3–2	Olympique Saint-Quentin (5)
