= Nicolas Bruneel =

French footballer (born 1997)

Personal information
- Date of birth: 8 March 1997 (age 29)
- Place of birth: Coudekerque-Branche, France
- Height: 1.78 m (5 ft 10 in)
- Position: Midfielder

Team information
- Current team: Pays de Cassel

Senior career*
Years	Team	Apps	(Gls)
2015–2022	Dunkerque	67	(3)
2017–2018	Dunkerque B	10	(0)
2022–	Pays de Cassel	49+ (Note: Statistics missing for the 2022–23 season.)	(12+)
- * Club domestic league appearances and goals as of 22:40, 11 February 2026 (UTC)

Nicolas Bruneel (born 8 March 1997) is a French professional footballer who plays as a midfielder for Championnat National 3 club Pays de Cassel.

== Career ==
Bruneel made his professional debut with Dunkerque in a 1–0 Ligue 2 win over Toulouse on 22 August 2020, scoring the only goal in his debut. He was not retained by Dunkerque in the summer of 2022, and signed for amateur side Pays de Cassel.
