= 2024–25 Coupe de France preliminary rounds =

2024–25 Coupe de France
Coupe Charles Simon

Tournament details
- Country: France

The 2024–25 Coupe de France preliminary rounds made up the qualifying competition to decide which teams took part in the main competition from the seventh round. This was the 108th season of the main football cup competition of France. The competition was organised by the French Football Federation (FFF) and was open to all clubs in French football, as well as clubs from the overseas departments and territories (Guadeloupe, French Guiana, Martinique, Mayotte, New Caledonia, Tahiti, Réunion, Saint Martin, and Saint Pierre and Miquelon). Due to Ligue 2 being reduced to 18 teams this season, 166 teams were due to qualify for the seventh round from the process, being 155 from the mainland regions and 11 from overseas territories. However, due to unrest in New Caledonia, no qualifying competition took place, and no representative was selected for the main competition.

The six (or more, if required) preliminary rounds were organised by the 13 Regional leagues from the mainland, and the 6 Regional leagues of the overseas departments and territories. They took place between April and October 2024.

== Schedule ==
Although all mainland regions follow a set schedule from the third round, regions are allowed to set their own schedules for earlier rounds, including any preliminaries required. The Paris-Île-de-France league chose to hold their early rounds at the end of the 2023–24 season, rather the normal August dates.

Overseas territories organise their own qualifying tournaments, aligning with entry into the main tournament at the seventh round.

Round	Date
Third round	15 September 2024
Fourth round	29 September 2024
Fifth round	13 October 2024
Sixth round	27 October 2024

== Leagues ==
The details of the qualifying rounds for each league is separated out to individual articles, to avoid this article being too lengthy.

=== Overseas leagues ===
==== Mayotte ====
On 23 April 2024, the Mayotte league announced the structure of the competition, and the draws for the first three rounds, confirming that 81 teams would take part. This would see 30 clubs from the third and fourth tier enter at the first round stage, with 3 given byes. The teams from the second tier were added to the draw with the winners and byes from the first round, and two ties were drawn to allow for the correct number of qualifiers for the third round, where the top tier clubs entered the competition. The round of 32 draw was published on 18 June 2024. The draw for the remaining rounds were published on 2 August 2024.

This match was played on 12 October 2024.

Final results: Mayotte
Tie no	Home team (Tier)	Score	Away team (Tier)
1.	(Mayotte) Feu du Centre (R4)	1–4	Diables Noirs (R1) (Mayotte)

Note: Mayotte League Structure (no promotion to French League Structure):
Régionale 1 (R1)
Régionale 2 (R2)
Régionale 3 (R3)
Régionale 4 (R4)

==== Réunion ====
In a change to last season, the Réunion league designated that the qualifying competition would be open to teams from the top three tiers, Régional 1, Régional 2 and Super 2. On 2 May 2024 the league published, via their official Facebook page, the draw for the opening round, referred to as the preliminary round, with 21 ties drawn, implying 11 byes to the next round and a total of 53 teams participating. The subsequent round, referred to as the third round to align with the rest of the qualifying competitions, was also published on the league's official Facebook page on 26 June 2024. The fourth round draw was published on 17 July 2024. The fifth round draw was published on 22 August 2024. The sixth round draw was conducted on local television and published on 8 October 2024 via the league's official Facebook page.

These matches were played on 30 October 2024.

Sixth round results: Réunion
Tie no	Home team (Tier)	Score	Away team (Tier)
1.	(Réunion) Saint-Pauloise FC (R1)	0–0 (1–3 p)	Saint-Denis FC (R1) (Réunion)
2.	(Réunion) AS Marsouins (R2)	0–2	JS Saint-Pierroise (R1) (Réunion)

Note: Reúnion League Structure (no promotion to French League Structure):
Régional 1 (R1)
Régional 2 (R2)
Super 2 (S2)

==== French Guiana ====
On 9 August 2024, the league published the list of the 37 teams registered for the qualifying competition, and the structure of the competition. A preliminary round, analogous to the second round in the mainland competition, would see ten teams enter. The remaining teams entered at the 3rd round stage.

These matches were played on 2 and 3 November 2024.

Sixth Round Results: French Guiana
Tie no	Home team (Tier)	Score	Away team (Tier)
1.	(French Guiana) ASE Matoury (R1)	3–0	FC Charvein Mana (R2) (French Guiana)
2.	(French Guiana) US Sinnamary (R1)	1–2	Aigles d'Or Mana (R2) (French Guiana)

Note: French Guiana League Structure (no promotion to French League Structure):
Régional 1 (R1)
Régional 2 (R2)
Régional 3 (R3)

==== Martinique ====
The draw for the first preliminary round, referred to as the second round to align with the rest of the competition, in the region was made on 15 July 2024 and published by the league on 22 July 2024. There were 23 ties drawn with 9 teams given byes to the third round. The draw for the third round was published on 28 August 2024. The fourth round draw was published in local media on 17 September 2024. The fifth round draw was published on the league's Facebook page on 19 September 2024. The sixth round draw was published on 3 October 2024.

These matches were played on 26 October 2024.

Sixth Round Results: Martinique
Tie no	Home team (Tier)	Score	Away team (Tier)
1.	(Martinique) Golden Lion FC (R1)	1–2	RC Saint-Joseph (R1) (Martinique)
2.	(Martinique) AS Samaritaine (R1)	1–0	Espoir Sainte-Luce (R1) (Martinique)

Note: Martinique League Structure (no promotion to French League Structure):
Régionale 1 (R1)
Régionale 2 (R2)
Régionale 3 (R3)

==== Guadeloupe ====
The draw for the opening round of the competition, named as the second round to align with the main competition, was made on 30 July 2024, and published on the leagues website on 23 August 2024. The third round draw, which saw the entry of the team from the Collectivity of Saint Martin, was published on the leagues Facebook page on 13 September 2024. The fourth round draw was also published on the leagues Facebook page on 27 September 2024. Similarly, the fifth round draw was published on 16 October 2024. The sixth and final round draw was published on 25 October 2024.

These matches were played on 26 October 2024.

Sixth Round Results: Guadeloupe
Tie no	Home team (Tier)	Score	Away team (Tier)
1.	(Guadeloupe) Jeunesse Evolution (R1)	1–1 (3–2 p)	ASC Siroco Les Abymes (R1) (Guadeloupe)
2.	(Guadeloupe) CS Moulien (R1)	2–1	US Baie-Mahault (R1) (Guadeloupe)

Note: Guadeloupe League Structure (no promotion to French League Structure):
Ligue Régionale 1 (R1)
Ligue Régionale 2 (R2)
Ligue Régionale 3 (R3)

==== Saint Pierre and Miquelon ====
To be completed.

=== Nouvelle-Aquitaine ===
A total of fifteen teams qualified from the Nouvelle-Aquitaine preliminary rounds, one more than the previous season.

In 2023-24, two teams from the region progressed to the Round of 32, Bergerac Périgord FC and Trélissac-Antonne Périgord FC. Both lost at home to Ligue 1 opposition by a single goal; Bergerac to Lyon and Trélissac to Brest.

These matches were played on 26 and 27 October and 2 November 2024.

Sixth Round Results: Nouvelle Aquitaine
Tie no	Home team (Tier)	Score	Away team (Tier)
1.	Thouars Foot 79 (6)	1–0	Stade Bordelais (5)
2.	Cazaux Olympique (8)	2–1	AS Le Taillan (8)
3.	FC Cœur Médoc Atlantique (7)	1–4	FC Girondins de Bordeaux (4)
4.	FC Dompierre-Sainte-Soulle (7)	2–2 (3–4 p)	Angoulême Charente FC (4)
5.	ES Buxerolles (6)	1–2	USE Couzeix-Chaptelat (7)
6.	Aviron Bayonnais (5)	5–1	US Lège Cap Ferret (5)
7.	Chamois Niortais F.C. (8)	4–1	Ozon FC (7)
8.	CS Feytiat (6)	2–2 (3–1 p)	JA Biarritz (7)
9.	FCE Mérignac Arlac (6)	3–0	Stade Poitevin FC (4)
10.	FC Marmande 47 (7)	1–1 (5–3 p)	AS Tarnos (8)
11.	ES Beaumont-Saint-Cyr (7)	1–1 (5–4 p)	La Brède FC (7)
12.	SA Mérignac (6)	2–0	Jeunesse Villenave (6)
13.	Étoile Maritime FC (7)	0–0 (4–2 p)	AS Panazol (5)
14.	ES Linars (8)	1–3	FC Bressuire (6)
15.	AF Portugais Limoges (7)	0–0 (2–4 p)	Avenir Mourenxois (8)

=== Pays de la Loire ===
A total of eleven teams qualified from the Pays de la Loire preliminary rounds.

In 2023–24, FC Challans and Les Herbiers VF both progressed to the Round of 64, before losing to higher tier opposition at home. Challans were defeated 4–0 by Ligue 2 side Rodez AF, whilst Les Herbiers were knocked out on penalties by Championnat National side LB Châteauroux on penalties, after a 2–2 draw.

The Pays de la Loire league published the first round draw on 2 August 2024. Three days later, they published the full structure of the competition, confirming a total of 516 teams from the region had entered, and that 414 teams would take part in the first round, including all teams from the District levels and all but 29 teams from the Régional 3 division. The second round would include the remainder of the Régional 3 teams and 40 teams from Régional 2. The third round would include 17 teams from Régional 1 and 7 teams from Championnat National 3. The 5 teams from Championnat National 2 would enter at the fourth round stage, and the sole team from Championnat National would enter at the fifth round stage.

The second round draw was published on 28 August 2024. The third round draw was published on 12 September 2024. The fourth round draw took place on 18 September 2024, with the results published on 20 September 2024. The fifth round draw took place on 2 October 2024, with the results published a day later. The sixth round draw was made live on the league's official Facebook page on 16 October 2024.

These matches were played on 26 and 27 October 2024.

Sixth Round Results: Pays de la Loire
Tie no	Home team (Tier)	Score	Away team (Tier)
1.	FC Fuilet-Chaussaire (9)	1–4	Les Herbiers VF (4)
2.	US Changé (6)	2–4	Le Mans FC (3)
3.	La Suze Roëzé FC (7)	1–3	Olympique Saumur FC (4)
4.	US La Baule-Le Pouliguen (6)	0–3	La Roche VF (4)
5.	US Philbertine Football (5)	2–2 (7–6 p)	AS La Châtaigneraie (5)
6.	FC Saint-Julien Divatte (6)	1–4	ESOF La Roche-sur-Yon (5)
7.	ES Moncé (8)	0–6	Vendée Fontenay Foot (5)
8.	FC Pellouailles-Corze (7)	0–0 (3–4 p)	USSA Vertou (5)
9.	FC Fief Gesté (10)	0–0 (4–3 p)	La Saint-André (8)
10.	Saint-André-Saint-Macaire FC (7)	0–5	Sablé FC (5)
11.	FC Saint-Philbert-Réorthe-Jaudonnière (11)	0–0 (5–4 p)	SO Cholet (8)

=== Centre-Val de Loire ===
A total of six teams qualified from the Centre-Val de Loire preliminary rounds.

In 2023–24, three sides from the region progressed to the round of 32. US Orléans and LB Châteauroux were both defeated by Ligue 1 opposition in Paris Saint-Germain and Le Havre, respectively. SO Romorantin were defeated by AS Saint-Priest, from one league below them.

The league published the draw for the first two rounds on 19 July 2024, with the structure of these rounds indicating 260 clubs from the region had entered the competition. The first round consisted of 93 ties, featuring all but one district-level teams. The second round draw saw all the regional-level teams, and the remaining district-level team enter, with a total of 77 ties drawn. The third round, drawn on 5 September 2024, saw the entry of the nine Championnat National 3 teams from the region. The fourth round, drawn on 18 September 2024, saw the entry of the three Championnat National 2 teams from the region. The fifth round, drawn on 2 October 2024, saw the entry of the single Championnat National team from the region. The sixth round was drawn on 16 October 2024.

These matches were played on 26 and 27 October 2024.

Sixth Round Results: Centre-Val de Loire
Tie no	Home team (Tier)	Score	Away team (Tier)
1.	Saint-Pryvé Saint-Hilaire FC (4)	0–0 (5–6 p)	SO Romorantin (5)
2.	Blois Football 41 (4)	1–1 (2–4 p)	Vierzon FC (5)
3.	Tours FC (6)	2–1	FC Montlouis (5)
4.	ES Bourgueil (9)	0–4	US Orléans (3)
5.	ES Moulon Bourges (5)	1–1 (4–5 p)	C'Chartres Football (5)
6.	AS Portugais Bourges (7)	1–2	US Monnaie (6)

=== Corsica ===
Two teams qualified from the Corsica preliminary rounds.

In 2023–24, AS Furiani-Agliani were the team from the region that progressed furthest in the main competition, losing in the eighth round to Entente SSG from Championnat National 3, one division below, by a single goal.

On 1 August 2024, the league announced that there were 38 teams entered into the competition, and laid out the format of the preliminary rounds. 12 teams from Regional 3 and Regional 4 entered from the start of the competition, aligned with the second round of the other regions. The 18 other Regional teams, and the 4 teams from Championnat National 3 entered at the third round stage. The two Championnat National 2 teams entered at the fourth round stage. By the time the draw for the second round was made on 8 August 2024, this had changed to just five ties being drawn and 19 byes, due to one team withdrawing from the competition.

The third round draw was published on 5 September 2024. The fourth round draw was published on 19 September 2024. The fifth round draw was published on 3 October 2024. The sixth round draw was published on 17 October 2024.

These matches were played on 27 October 2024.

Sixth Round Results: Corsica
Tie no	Home team (Tier)	Score	Away team (Tier)
1.	GC Lucciana (5)	3–0	AS Casinca (6)
2.	USC Corte (5)	3–1	Sud FC (5)

=== Bourgogne-Franche-Comté ===
A total of nine teams qualified from the Bourgogne-Franche-Comté preliminary rounds.

In 2023–24, FC Sochaux Montbéliard progressed the furthest in the competition, reaching the round of 16, where they were heavily beaten by Ligue 1 opponents Rennes.

The first round draw was published by the league on 11 July 2024, with 138 ties drawn including all teams from District level divisions, and all but 24 teams from the third tier of the Regional league. The second round draw was published on 20 August 2024, with the 24 previously exempted Regional 3 teams and the 38 Regional 2 teams joining at this stage. The third round was published on 3 September 2024, having taken place the day before, and saw the 23 Regional 1 teams and the 11 Championnat National 3 teams enter the competition. Subsequent draws were streamed live by the league from various locations. The fourth round draw took place on 17 September 2024, with the single team from Championnat National 2 entering at this stage. The fifth round draw took place on 1 October 2024, with the two teams from Championnat National entering at this stage. The sixth round draw took place on 15 October 2024. In total, 376 clubs from the region entered the competition; 375 during the preliminary rounds, and AJ Auxerre of Ligue 1 during the main competition.

These matches were played on 26 and 27 October 2024.

Sixth Round Results: Bourgogne-Franche-Comté
Tie no	Home team (Tier)	Score	Away team (Tier)
1.	ASPTT Dijon (5)	0–4	Dijon FCO (3)
2.	ASM Belfort (5)	0–2	Jura Sud Foot (4)
3.	FC Chalon (6)	1–1 (4–5 p)	Jura Dolois Football (5)
4.	Team Montceau Foot (7)	1–2	UF Mâconnais (5)
5.	ES Exincourt-Taillecourt (8)	0–5	FC Vesoul (6)
6.	AS Audincourt (6)	0–3	FC Grandvillars (6)
7.	US Coulanges-lès-Nevers (9)	1–2	FC Valdahon-Vercel (6)
8.	Avallon FCO (7)	1–3	FC Sochaux Montbéliard (3)
9.	Is-Selongey Football (6)	1–1 (3–5 p)	FC Gueugnon (5)

=== Grand Est ===
A total of twenty teams qualified from the Grand Est preliminary rounds.

In the 2023–24 edition of the competition, US Thionville Lusitanos and Sarreguemines FC both progressed furthest, reaching the round of 64 stage. Thionville were defeated by Ligue 1 side Olympique de Marseille by a single goal, whilst Sarreguemines succumbed to Ligue 2 side FC Valenciennes in a two-goal defeat.

On 18 July 2024, the league published the draw for the first round of the competition. The draw consisted of 360 ties featuring teams from district divisions and some from the third tier of the regional league. The draw also listed the 213 clubs still exempt at this stage, confirming that 933 from the region were taking part in the competition this season. The second round draw was published on 20 August 2024, and saw the remaining teams from the third tier of the regional league, and all but four teams from the second tier of the regional league, join the competition. The third round draw, which say the entry of all remaining teams from the regional league, the seven teams from Championnat National 3, and the qualifying team from Saint Pierre and Miquelon, was published on 3 September 2024.

The fourth round draw, which saw the four teams from Championnat National 2 enter the competition, was published in three parts (with reference to the three geographical sectors the league splits itself into) on 17 and 18 September 2024. The fifth round draw was published on 1 October 2024, and saw the single Championnat National team from the region enter the competition. The sixth round draw was published on 17 October 2024.

These matches were played on 26 and 27 October 2024.

Sixth Round Results: Grand Est
Tie no	Home team (Tier)	Score	Away team (Tier)
1.	SR Colmar (5)	2–1	FC Mulhouse (6)
2.	AS Aspach-le-Haut (10)	2–5	FCSR Obernai (7)
3.	FA Illkirch Graffenstaden (6)	5–2	Étoile Naborienne Saint-Avold (7)
4.	ESAP Metz (8)	0–4	Association Still-Mutzig (6)
5.	ASL Kœtzingue (6)	2–2 (4–5 p)	US Nousseviller (7)
6.	CA Boulay (7)	2–0	Sarreguemines FC (5)
7.	FC Freyming (8)	3–1	AS Blotzheim (7)
8.	US Sarre-Union (5)	2–1	FCO Strasbourg Koenigshoffen 06 (5)
9.	SSEP Hombourg-Haut (6)	0–1	ASC Biesheim (4)
10.	US Oberlauterbach (6)	0–3	FCSR Haguenau (4)
11.	AC Blainville-Damelevières (8)	0–2	Chaumont FC (6)
12.	COS Villers (7)	0–1	SAS Épinal (4)
13.	Olympique Charleville Prix Ardenne Métropole (5)	4–0	FC Hagondange (6)
14.	FC Saint-Meziery (6)	1–1 (4–5 p)	US Thionville Lusitanos (4)
15.	CS Blénod (8)	2–0	Reims Murigny Franco Portugais (8)
16.	AS Nancy Lorraine (3)	12–0 (Note: Tie reversed from original draw, due to security concerns.)	FC Dieulouard Marbache Belleville (8)
17.	FC Tinqueux Champagne (8)	1–6	FC Lunéville (6)
18.	SR Saint-Dié (7)	0–2	FC Hettange-Grande (7)
19.	ES Thaon (5)	4–0	FC Bogny (6)
20.	ES Golbey (7)	1–6	US Raon-l'Étape (5)

=== Méditerranée ===
A total of six teams qualified from the Méditerranée preliminary rounds.

In 2023–24, FC Martigues and AS Cannes both progressed to the eighth round, before losing out to opposition from lower leagues. Martigues were defeated 1–2 at home by Olympique Alès and Cannes lost on penalties after a 2–2 draw against Régional 1 side AS Fabrègues.

The first round draw was published on 29 July 2024, with 68 ties consisting of teams from the District level leagues, with 30 of these teams receiving byes to the second round. The second round draw was published on 27 August 2024, with the remaining clubs from the District leagues and the clubs from the Regional level leagues all entering.

The third round draw, featuring the entry of the five clubs from Championnat National 3 was streamed live on the league's YouTube channel on 4 September 2024. The fourth round draw, featuring the entry of the seven clubs from Championnat National 2 was published on 19 September 2024. The fifth round draw, featuring the entry of the single Championnat National team from the region, was streamed live on the league's YouTube channel, on 1 October 2024. The sixth round draw was published on 17 October 2024.

The structuring of the rounds indicated that a total of 231 teams from the region entered the competition, including the four clubs from Ligue 1 and Ligue 2.

These matches were played on 26 and 27 October 2024, with two postponed to 2 and 3 November 2024.

Sixth Round Results: Méditerranée
Tie no	Home team (Tier)	Score	Away team (Tier)
1.	ES Cannet Rocheville (5)	5–1 (Note: Original match postponed due to a forecast of severe weather. Rearranged for the following weekend.)	AS Maximoise (6)
2.	Berre SC (7)	1–2	Marignane Gignac Côte Bleue FC (4)
3.	Six-Fours Le Brusc FC (6)	1–3	AS Cannes (4)
4.	FC Rousset Sainte Victoire (5)	2–3	FC Istres (4)
5.	Carnoux FC (6)	1–0	EUGA Ardziv (5)
6.	AC Arlésien (6)	0–0 (4–3 p)	Saint-Didier Espérance Pernoise (7)

=== Occitanie ===
A total of ten teams qualified from the Occitanie preliminary rounds.

In 2023–24, four teams from the region made it to the Round of 64. Championnat National side Nîmes Olympique lost at that stage to divisional rivals US Orléans. Championnat National 2 side Olympique Alès suffered a tight home defeat to Ligue 2 side Paris FC. Of the two Régional 1 sides that reached this stage, AS Fabrègues lost at home to Championnat National 2 side Trélissac-Antonne Périgord FC, whilst US Revel lost heavily to the eventual winners Paris Saint-Germain F.C.

In a document published on 1 July 2024, the league stated there were 527 entrants from the region. The league published the draw for the first two rounds on 23 July 2024, along with a revision of the total entries to 508, and the confirmed structure of the preliminary rounds. The first round consisted of 101 fixtures, with teams from Régional 1 and Régional 2 divisions exempt, along with the 14 teams from below this level with the best record in last years competition. The second round draw consisted of 146 ties, including those teams exempted from the first round

The third round draw was published on 3 September 2024, consisting of 78 ties, and seeing the ten teams from Championnat National 3 enter the competition. The fourth round draw was published on 17 September 2024. There were 39 ties drawn. The fifth round draw was published on 2 October 2024, with the entry of the single team from Championnat National to the competition, and 20 ties drawn. The sixth round draw, with 10 ties, was published on 17 October 2024.

These matches were played on 26 and 27 October 2024, with one rearranged for 3 November 2024.

Sixth Round Results: Occitanie
Tie no	Home team (Tier)	Score	Away team (Tier)
1.	ES Grau-du-Roi (6)	3–0	AS Béziers (6)
2.	FC Sussargues-Berange (9)	1–2	Olympique Alès (5)
3.	Union Saint-Jean FC (6)	2–2 (4–2 p)	US Pibrac (7)
4.	Stade Beaucairois (5)	3–2	Nîmes Olympique (3)
5.	FC Bagnols Pont (7)	0–3	Canet Roussillon FC (5)
6.	AS Lattes (7)	1–1 (1–3 p) (Note: The match was postponed from 26 October 2024 until 3 November 2024, due to an ongoing investigation into the validity of the result of the game involving SC Anduzien in the fifth round.)	SC Anduzien (8)
7.	AS Muret (6)	0–1	US Colomiers Football (5)
8.	Tarbes Pyrénées Football (6)	0–1	RCO Agde (5)
9.	Saint-Orens FC (8)	0–1	AF Biars-Bretenoux (6)
10.	FC Comtal (7)	1–1 (4–2 p)	Blagnac FC (5)

=== Hauts-de-France ===
A total of twenty-one teams qualified from the Hauts-de-France preliminary rounds.

In 2023–24, Entente Feignies Aulnoye FC progressed the furthest from the region, reaching the round of 32 by knocking out Ligue 2 side US Quevilly-Rouen, before losing at home to Montpellier HSC in a game that had been postponed due to snow.

Draws for the first two rounds were carried out separately by districts. In Artois, the first round draw was published on 25 July 2024, and the second round draw was published on 27 August 2024. 62 ties were drawn in the first round, and 47 in the second round. In Escaut, both draws were published on 13 August 2024. 70 ties were drawn in the first round, and 53 ties in the second. In Flandres, both draws were published on 18 July 2024. 57 ties were drawn in the first round, and 43 ties in the second round. In Côte d'Opale, the first round draw was published on 7 August 2024, and the second round draw was published on 26 August 2024. 56 ties were drawn in the first round, and 43 in the second round. In Aisne, the first round draw was published on 17 July 2024, and the second round draw was published on 26 August 2024. 40 ties were drawn in the first round, and 29 in the second round. In Oise, the first round draw was published on 25 July 2024, and the second round draw was published on 27 August 2024. 48 ties were drawn in the first round, and 37 in the second round. In Somme, the first round draw was published on 11 July 2024, and the second round draw was published on 26 August 2024. 46 ties were drawn in the first round, and 36 in the second round.

The draw for the third round, which saw the remaining clubs from the Regional divisions, and those from Championnat National 3 enter the competition, was published on 6 September 2024. 159 ties were drawn. The fourth round draw, which saw clubs from Championnat National 2 enter the competition, was published on 19 September 2024. 82 ties were drawn. The fifth round draw, which saw the two clubs from Championnat National enter the competition, was published on 3 October 2024. 42 ties were drawn. The 21 ties of the sixth round draw were published on 17 October 2024.

These matches were played on 26 and 27 October 2024.

Sixth Round Results: Hauts-de-France
Tie no	Home team (Tier)	Score	Away team (Tier)
1.	FC Seclin (8)	2–4	Arras FA (6)
2.	FC Raismes (7)	0–0 (4–3 p)	US Le Pays du Valois (5)
3.	EC Anstaing-Chéreng-Tressin-Gruson (8)	1–1 (3–2 p)	SR Lomme Délivrance (9)
4.	US Noyelles-sous-Lens (7)	3–0	CAS Escaudœuvres (8)
5.	USM Senlisienne (7)	0–3	Stade Béthunois (6)
6.	Iris Club de Croix (5)	3–3 (3–4 p)	Valenciennes FC (3)
7.	RC Roubaix (7)	2–2 (3–1 p)	ES Genech (8)
8.	US Vimy (5)	1–1 (4–5 p)	US Chantilly (4)
9.	JS Longuenesse (8)	1–1 (1–3 p)	US Crépy-en-Valois (8)
10.	AS Sin-le-Noble (9)	0–4	AS Beauvais Oise (4)
11.	US Saint-Maximin (7)	0–1	US Saint-Omer (6)
12.	US Pays de Cassel (5)	2–1	US Tourcoing FC (6)
13.	RC Labourse (9)	0–0 (3–1 p)	AS Étaples (7)
14.	FC Liancourt-Clermont (7)	3–1	US Laon (7)
15.	AS Hautmont (8)	0–6	Entente Feignies Aulnoye FC (4)
16.	US Hordain (8)	0–1	Calais Beau-Marais (6)
17.	Olympique Maroilles (9)	1–3	FC Porto Portugais Amiens (6)
18.	US Daours Vecquemont Bussy Aubigny (10)	0–5	RC Calais (5)
19.	EAC Cysoing-Wannehain-Bourghelles (9)	0–5	US Boulogne (3)
20.	FC Recques-sur-Hem (9)	0–2	CG Haubourdin (8)
21.	Le Touquet AC (8)	3–2	Olympique Saint-Quentin (5)

=== Normandy ===
A total of nine teams qualified from the Normandy preliminary rounds.

In 2023–24, FC Rouen were the qualifying team from the region that progressed furthest in the competition. The team from Championnat National progressed to the quarter-final stage, beating Ligue 1 opposition Toulouse FC and AS Monaco FC on the way, before losing out to Ligue 2 side Valenciennes FC in a penalty shoot-out.

On 23 July 2024, the league published the structure of the qualifying competition in the region, along with the 134 ties of the first round, and the fact that 391 teams had entered. The second round draw, featuring 120 ties and the 106 regional level teams exempted from the first round draw, was published on 27 August 2024. The third round draw, which saw the entry to the competition of the teams from Championnat National 3 was published on 9 September 2024. 65 ties were drawn. The fourth round draw, featuring the entry to the competition of the teams from Championnat National 2 was published on 17 September 2024, and say 34 ties drawn. The fifth round draw, which included the two Championnat National teams from the region, was published on 1 October 2024, with 18 ties drawn. The 9 ties of the sixth round draw were published on 15 October 2024.

These matches were played on 26 and 27 October 2024.

Sixth Round Results: Normandy
Tie no	Home team (Tier)	Score	Away team (Tier)
1.	FC Pays Aiglon (8)	0–3	Maladrerie OS (6)
2.	FC Rouen (3)	11–1 (Note: Tie reversed from original draw.)	Stade Grand-Quevilly (8)
3.	AS Villers Houlgate Côte Fleurie (4)	1–2	US Avranches (4)
4.	FC Serquigny-Nassandres (7)	2–1	FC Flers (5)
5.	FC Saint-Lô Manche (5)	5–0	AG Caennaise (5)
6.	Olympia'caux FC (7)	0–0 (3–4 p)	US Alençon (5)
7.	USON Mondeville (7)	0–3	US Quevilly-Rouen Métropole (3)
8.	Canteleu FC (9)	1–1 (3–4 p)	US Bolbec (6)
9.	AS Tourlaville (7)	0–4	SU Dives-Cabourg (5)

=== Brittany ===
A total of fifteen teams qualified from the Brittany preliminary rounds.

In 2023–24, Dinan Léhon FC, progressed furthest in the main competition, reaching the round of 64, before losing to Ligue 1 side Stade de Reims.

On 25 June 2024, the league announced that 672 people from the region had entered the competition. The draw for the first round, with 246 ties, was published on 16 August 2024. The 194 ties of the second round were published on 29 August 2024. The third round draw, which saw the teams from Régional 1 and Championnat National 3 enter the competition, was published on 12 September 2024, with 114 ties drawn. The fourth round draw, featuring the clubs from Championnat National 2, consisted of 59 ties and was published on 18 September 2024. The fifth round draw, featuring the single team in the region from Championnat National, was published on 2 October 2024, with 30 ties drawn. The fifteen ties of the sixth round were published on 16 October 2024.

These matches were played on 26 and 27 October 2024.

Sixth round results: Brittany
Tie no	Home team (tier)	Score	Away team (tier)
1.	AS Uzel-Merléac (8)	0–4	Stade Briochin (4)
2.	Quimper Ergué-Armel FC (7)	0–3	Dinan Léhon FC (4)
3.	EA Saint-Renan (6)	1–2	Saint-Colomban Sportive Locminé (4)
4.	Stade Paimpolais FC (7)	2–1	Enfants de Guer (8)
5.	CEP Lorient (7)	0–1	Saint-Pierre de Milizac (5)
6.	ASC Romagné (8)	0–0 (4–5 p)	CO Briochin Sportif Ploufraganais (6)
7.	OC Cesson (5)	5–0	US Trégunc (6)
8.	FC Dinardais (7)	1–2	TA Rennes (5)
9.	Auray FC (7)	1–1 (3–4 p)	Ruffiac-Malestroit (7)
10.	AS Vitré (5)	8–0	Cercle Paul Bert Bréquigny (6)
11.	FC Bélugas Ria (8)	0–2	US Montagnarde (6)
12.	ES Plescop (7)	1–3	Vannes OC (5)
13.	Bocage FC (8)	0–2	US Saint-Malo (4)
14.	Dernières Cartouches Carhaix (8)	0–3	AS Ginglin Cesson (6)
15.	Baud FC (7)	0–2	US Concarneau (3)

=== Paris-Île-de-France ===
A total of eleven teams progressed from the Paris-Île-de-France preliminary rounds.

In 2023–24, Racing Club de France Football were the team from the region that progressed furthest in the main competition, reaching the Round of 32 before being narrowly beaten by Ligue 1 side Lille OSC.

As in previous seasons, the region held the first two preliminary rounds after the end of the previous season, in May and June 2024. On 16 April 2024, the league announced that 481 clubs in total from the region had entered the competition, and that there would be 179 ties in the first round, featuring teams from the district-level leagues. On 23 April 2024, the league confirmed some changes to the clubs entered. On 14 May 2024, the draw for the second round was published, with the teams from the regional-level leagues entering at this stage, and 133 matches drawn. Because these rounds took place at the end of the 2023–24 season, the teams from the region that qualified for promotion to 2024–25 Championnat National 3 participated in the second round.

On 16 July 2024, the league outlined the plans for the remainder of the competition. To meet the target number of teams in each round, 13 teams in the draw for the third round were exempted to the fourth round. On 27 August 2024, the 13 exempted teams were published. The 66 ties of the third round were published by 3 September 2024, and were posted on the leagues social channels on 13 September 2024. The 42 matches of the fourth round, which saw the teams from Championnat National 2 enter the competition, were drawn on 17 September 2024. The fifth round saw the entry of the teams from Championnat National enter the draw, with 22 matches drawn on 1 October 2024. The 11 sixth round ties were drawn on 15 October 2024.

These matches were played on 26 and 27 October 2024.

Sixth Round Results: Paris-Île-de-France
Tie no	Home team (Tier)	Score	Away team (Tier)
1.	CS Brétigny (5)	2–2 (4–3 p)	Paris 13 Atletico (3)
2.	Le Mée Sports (6)	0–2	AC Houilles (6)
3.	ES Vitry (10)	1–6	JA Drancy (5)
4.	Cergy Pontoise FC (6)	1–2	AC Paris 15 (7)
5.	Paris Université Club (9)	0–6	FCM Aubervilliers (4)
6.	Football Club 93 Bobigny-Bagnolet-Gagny (4)	4–0	Racing Club de France Football (5)
7.	Tremblay FC (7)	1–1 (0–3 p)	FC Versailles 78 (3)
8.	CO Les Ulis (6)	4–0	CS Meaux (7)
9.	ESA Linas-Montlhéry (5)	2–2 (3–1 p)	Montrouge FC 92 (6)
10.	Saint-Denis US (6)	0–4	FC Fleury 91 (4)
11.	SFC Neuilly-sur-Marne (5)	0–0(3–0 p)	FC Mantois 78 (6)

=== Auvergne-Rhône-Alpes ===
A total of twenty teams qualified from the Auvergne-Rhône-Alpes preliminary rounds.

In 2023–24, Le Puy Foot 43 Auvergne reached the Quarter Final of the competition, and were the team from the preliminary rounds to progress furthest, beating Ligue 2 oppositions twice, before losing out to Stade Rennais F.C.

During the period 23 to 24 July 2024, the league met to draw the first round of the competition, and define the structure of the early rounds. The ligue also announced that 907 teams from the region had entered the competition. The first round consisted of 322 ties, featuring teams from the district level leagues, with 78 teams from this level exempted to the second round. On 29 July, modifications and corrections to the draw were published. The second round draw was published before the first round took place, and was published on 19 August 2024. The draw consisted of 271 ties, and featured the entry into the competition of the exempted district-level teams and those from the lower two regional level leagues.

The third round draw, which saw the entry of the Régional 1 and Championnat National 3 teams, was published on 4 September 2024, with 151 ties drawn. The fourth round draw was published on 17 September, with 78 ties drawn, and saw the entry in to the competition of the Championnat National 2 teams from the region. On 1 October 2024, the fifth round draw was published, with 40 ties drawn, and with the teams from Championnat National entering for the first time. The 20 ties of the sixth round draw were published on 16 October 2024.

These matches were played on 26 and 27 October 2024.

Sixth Round Results: Auvergne-Rhône-Alpes
Tie no	Home team (Tier)	Score	Away team (Tier)
1.	Roannais Foot 42 (8)	0–4	Hauts Lyonnais (5)
2.	FA Le Cendre (7)	0–2	AS Montferrand Football (none)
3.	US Mozac (7)	0–2	FC Espaly (5)
4.	Clermont Métropole FC (9)	1–3	Lempdes Sport (7)
5.	Sauveteurs Brivois (8)	1–1 (5–4 p)	FCO Firminy-Insersport (6)
6.	AS Saint-Just-Saint-Rambert (8)	2–2 (4–3 p)	AS Domérat (6)
7.	AS Saint-Priest (4)	1–2	FC Villefranche Beaujolais (3)
8.	AS Guéreins-Genouilleux (10)	2–1	Olympique Lyon Sud (7)
9.	US Issoire (7)	0–4	Le Puy Foot 43 Auvergne (4)
10.	Olympique de Valence (6)	4–3	L'Étrat-La Tour Sportif (7)
11.	FC Colombier-Satolas (8)	0–2	FC Saint-Cyr Collonges au Mont d'Or (6)
12.	AS Sud Ardèche (7)	0–2	FC Foron (7)
13.	ES Bressane Marboz (8)	2–0	ES Seynod (8)
14.	ASC Sallanches (9)	0–5	FC Bourgoin-Jallieu (5)
15.	FC Pays Voironnais (9)	1–3	FC Allobroges Asafia (7)
16.	Aix-les-Bains FC (7)	1–1 (2–4 p)	Valence FC (8)
17.	Football Bourg-en-Bresse Péronnas 01 (3)	1–2	GFA Rumilly-Vallières (4)
18.	CS Viriat (8)	0–1	GOAL FC (4)
19.	US Annecy-le-Vieux (7)	1–1 (2–4 p)	Chambéry SF (5)
20.	ASF Pierrelatte (8)	1–1 (4–5 p)	Cluses-Scionzier FC (6)
