= US Pays de Cassel =

Football club based in Nord, France

Pays de Cassel
- Full name: Union Sportive du Pays de Cassel
- Founded: 2018
- President: Jean-Jacques Vaesken
- League: National 3 Group G
- 2022–23: Régional 1 Hauts-de-France, Group C, 1st (promoted)
- Website: https://us-pays-de-cassel.fr/

Union Sportive du Pays de Cassel is a football club based in Arnèke in the Nord department of France. As of the 2023–24 season, it competes in Championnat National 3, the fifth tier of French football, after winning promotion in 2023.

== History ==
US Pays de Cassel was founded in 2018 after the merger of four smaller local clubs: Hardifort, Noordpenne-Zuytpeene, Bavinchove-Cassel and Arnèke.

On 14 January 2023, Pays de Cassel eliminated Championnat National 2 (fourth-tier) side Wasquehal in the round of 64 of the 2022–23 Coupe de France following a penalty shoot-out. This set up an encounter with Ligue 1 champions Paris Saint-Germain in the following round, played at the Stade Bollaert-Delelis in Lens as Pays de Cassel's stadium did not meet the criteria to hold the game. At the time, Pays de Cassel had an annual budget of €150,000 while PSG's was €800 million; the two clubs were worth €400,000 and €3.2 billion, respectively. PSG won 7–0, with five goals from Kylian Mbappé.

== Squad ==
As of 23 January 2023

Note: Flags indicate national team as defined under FIFA eligibility rules; some limited exceptions apply. Players may hold more than one non-FIFA nationality.

| No. | Pos. | Nation | Player |
|---|---|---|---|
| — | GK | FRA | Elio Clausi |
| — | GK | FRA | Romain Samson |
| — | DF | FRA | Arthur Bogdanski |
| — | DF | FRA | Hugo Dubreucq |
| — | DF | FRA | Kévin Rudent |
| — | DF | FRA | Dimitri Santrain |
| — | DF | FRA | Alexis Zmijak (captain) |
| — | MF | FRA | Clément Bogdanski |
| — | MF | FRA | Clément Boudjema |
| — | MF | FRA | Nicolas Bruneel |
| — | MF | FRA | Charles Delcourt |

| No. | Pos. | Nation | Player |
|---|---|---|---|
| — | MF | FRA | Julien Denaes |
| — | MF | FRA | Mathias Dron |
| — | MF | FRA | Baptiste Leclerc |
| — | MF | FRA | Corentin Rapaille |
| — | MF | FRA | Lucas Thoor |
| — | FW | CGO | Robin Itoua |
| — | FW | FRA | Ayrance Leganase |
| — | FW | FRA | Isaac Loukou |
| — | FW | FRA | Keba Sané |
| — | FW | FRA | Elio Secq |
| — | FW | FRA | Mathieu Valdher |
