= 2025–26 Coupe de France preliminary rounds, Hauts-de-France =

The 2025–26 Coupe de France preliminary rounds, Hauts-de-France was the qualifying competition to decide which teams from the leagues of the Hauts-de-France region of France took part in the main competition from the seventh round.

A total of twenty-one teams qualified from the Hauts-de-France preliminary rounds.

In 2024–25, Valenciennes FC progressed furthest of the clubs from the region, reaching the round of 32 before losing out to their Championnat National rivals Le Mans FC after a penalty shoot-out.

== Draws and fixtures ==
Draws for the first two rounds were carried out separately by districts. In Artois, the first round draw was published on 16 July 2025, and the second round draw was published on 26 August 2025. 61 ties were drawn in the first round, and 48 in the second round. In Escaut, both first and second round draws were published together on 5 August 2025, with 74 ties in the first round and 55 in the second round. In Flandres, the first two rounds were published together on 22 July 2025, with 60 ties in the first round and 44 ties in the second round. The district of Côte d’Opale published the first two rounds on 11 August 2025, with 57 ties in the first round and 44 in the second round. In Aisne, the two rounds were published together on 24 July 2025, with 38 ties in the first round and 28 ties in the second round. In the district of Oise, the first round draw was published on 22 July 2025, with 50 ties drawn, and the second round draw was published on 25 August 2025, with 37 ties drawn. In Somme district, the first round draw was published on 17 July 2025, with 48 ties drawn, and the second round draw was published on 26 August 2025, with 35 ties drawn.

The third round draw, which saw the entry of teams which play in Régional 1 and one team from Championnat National 3, was published on 2 September 2025. The fourth round draw, which saw the entry into the competition of teams from the region playing in Championnat National 3 and Championnat National 2, was carried out on 18 September 2025. The fifth round draw, including the one team from the region that plays in Championnat National, was published on 1 October 2025. The draw for the sixth round was published on 20 October 2025.

=== First round ===
These matches are from the district of Artois, and were played on 24 August 2025.

First Round Results: Hauts-de-France (Artois)
Tie no	Home team (Tier)	Score	Away team (Tier)
1.	AS Fampoux (15)	0–5	US Beuvry (10)
2.	ÉS Rœux (14)	1–9	AS Violaines (10)
3.	ES Ourton (15)	0–6	ES Sainte-Catherine (10)
4.	ES Eleu (14)	0–4	US Grenay (11)
5.	AS Cauchy-à-la-Tour (12)	0–2	ES Laventie (10)
6.	USO Drocourt (13)	1–0	FC Verquigneuil (12)
7.	SCF Achicourt (14)	5–0	AS Bonnières Houvin (14)
8.	US Ruch Carvin (11)	2–1	ES Labeuvrière (9)
9.	AS Salomé (12)	1–4	SC Artésien (9)
10.	AS Tincquizel (10)	1–1 (4–3 p)	AS Vallée de la Ternoise (11)
11.	FC Beaumont (14)	0–4	US Ablain (11)
12.	EC Mazingarbe (11)	1–2	SC Aubigny Savy-Berlette Camblain-l'Abbé (12)
13.	FCE La Bassée (12)	0–3	AS Loison (10)
14.	AS Auchy-les-Mines (12)	1–1 (1–3 p)	US Houdain (12)
15.	Entente Verquin-Béthune (14)	0–4	AJ Ruitz (13)
16.	ES Haillicourt (14)	0–8	Stade Héninois (9)
17.	FC La Roupie-Isbergues (11)	4–3	CSAL Souchez (12)
18.	SC Tangry (15)	0–3 (Note: Tie won by means of forfeit.)	ÉS Saint-Laurent-Blangy-Feuchy (10)
19.	CS Diana Liévin (9)	6–1 (Note: Tie reversed from original draw.)	AAE Dourges (13)
20.	ES Allouagne (13)	3–2	AG Grenay (14)
21.	AAE Évin-Malmaison (13)	5–1	Sud Artois Foot (11)
22.	AS Noyelles-lès-Vermelles (13)	1–1 (2–4 p)	AC Noyelles-Godault (10)
23.	AFC Libercourtois (11)	2–0	FC Hinges (11)
24.	USC Monchy-Breton (13)	0–2	OSC Vitry-en-Artois (13)
25.	AEP Verdrel (13)	1–10	UC Divion (10)
26.	AJ Artois (12)	0–3	US Croisilles (10)
27.	FC Camblain-Châtelain (12)	1–2 (Note: FC Hersin penalised for fielding a suspended player. FC Camblain-Châtelain qualifed.)	FC Hersin (10)
28.	OC Cojeul (12)	1–2	FC Richebourg (13)
29.	AS Beaurains (12)	4–0	AS Sailly-Labourse (13)
30.	FC Givenchy-en-Gohelle (13)	5–0	AS Pont-à-Vendin (14)
31.	FC Tortequesne (12)	0–5	RC Vaudricourt Kennedy (10)
32.	FC Cuinchy (14)	4–2	Intrépides Norrent-Fontes (13)
33.	FC Hauts Lens (13)	2–5	AS Frévent (12)
34.	AS Barlin (12)	1–4	AS Vendin 2000 (13)
35.	AS Courrièrois (11)	2–1	FC Dynamo Carvin Fosse 4 (12)
36.	RC Bours (13)	1–8	CS Habarcq (10)
37.	AS Lyssois (13)	0–1	US Cheminots Avion (11)
38.	Diables Rouges Lambres-lez-Aire (14)	0–11	US Boubers-Conchy (12)
39.	US Maisnil (11)	0–3	US Saint-Maurice Loos-en-Gohelle (10)
40.	ES Thiennes (15)	2–4	ES Ficheux (12)
41.	AS Bailleul-Sir-Berthoult (12)	2–0	Tilloy FC (13)
42.	Espérance Calonne Liévin (9)	2–1 (Note: Espérance Calonne Liévin penalised for fielding a suspended player. ES Haisnes qualified.)	ES Haisnes (10)
43.	FC Estevelles (12)	0–9	Olympique Arras (10)
44.	CS Pernes (13)	0–5	US Billy-Berclau (11)
45.	Thélus FC (15)	0–3	AAE Aix-Noulette (10)
46.	US Gonnehem-Chocques (12)	1–1 (5–4 p)	UAS Harnes (9)
47.	FC Méricourt (12)	4–1	JF Guarbecque (10)
48.	OS Annequin (11)	1–1 (6–7 p)	ES Douvrin (12)
49.	US Lapugnoy (12)	3–0	ÉS Vendin (11)
50.	Auchel FC (11)	2–2 (2–4 p)	Olympique Liévin (10)
51.	US Hesdigneul (11)	3–0	FC Busnes (12)
52.	US Rivière (15)	1–5	USA Liévin (11)
53.	FC Bouvigny-Boyeffles (13)	4–1	RC Locon 2000 (13)
54.	US Izel-lès-Équerchin (14)	1–3	Atrébate FC (12)
55.	Olympique La Comté Omnisport (14)	3–2	Olympique Burbure (11)
56.	US Arleux-en-Gohelle (12)	1–1 (4–3 p)	FC Annay (11)
57.	FC Dainvillois (14)	0–5	RC Sains (11)
58.	US Mondicourt (14)	2–2 (4–5 p)	SC Fouquières (11)
59.	US Ham-en-Artois (14)	1–1 (2–3 p)	AS Neuvireuil-Gavrelle (11)
60.	JF Mazingarbe (11)	6–0	ES Val Sensée (12)
61.	FC Servins (12)	1–2	AS Bapaume-Bertincourt-Vaulx-Vraucourt (12)

These matches are from the district of Escaut, and were played on 24 August 2025.

First Round Results: Hauts-de-France (Escaut)
Tie no	Home team (Tier)	Score	Away team (Tier)
1.	US Villers-Sire-Nicole (12)	1–1 (2–4 p)	AFC Ferrière-la-Petite (11)
2.	US Beaufort/Limont-Fontaine (10)	0–2	OSC Assevent (10)
3.	US Prisches (14)	– (Note: Match abandoned in the 83rd minute. US Cartignies penalised, US Prisches qualified.)	US Cartignies (14)
4.	AS Étrœungt (12)	0–3	US Gommegnies-Carnoy (11)
5.	JS Avesnelloise (13)	3–4	IC Ferrière-la-Grande (11)
6.	AS Trélon (13)	3–1	SC Saint-Remy-du Nord (12)
7.	Sports Podéens Réunis (12)	0–12	AG Solrézienne (10)
8.	US Sars-Poteries (14)	4–5	US Glageon (13)
9.	US Landrecies (14)	2–3	FC Aunelle (13)
10.	FC Leval (14)	– (Note: Match abandoned in the 77th minute. FC Jenlain penalised, FC Leval qualified.)	FC Jenlain (12)
11.	US Ohain (14)	0–9	AS La Longueville (11)
12.	Wignehies Olympique (11)	3–3 (3–5 p)	ES Boussois (10)
13.	SC Maubeuge (13)	1–1 (6–5 p)	AS Bellignies (14)
14.	US Bousies Forest (11)	2–0 (Note: Tie reversed from original draw.)	AS Obies (13)
15.	AS Dompierre (14)	1–4	ASG Louvroil (10)
16.	CA Sainsois (14)	3–0	Maubeuge Olympique (14)
17.	SCEPS Pont-sur-Sambre (12)	1–3	AS Douzies (12)
18.	AFC Colleret (12)	4–4 (6–5 p)	AS Recquignies (11)
19.	SC Bachant (13)	0–3	US Cousolre (10)
20.	US Busigny (14)	0–13	AS Vendegies-Escarmain (11)
21.	AO Hermies (11)	1–1 (1–3 p)	SC Le Cateau (10)
22.	AS Thun-l'Évêque (12)	1–1 (5–4 p)	SCO Marquion Bourlon Épinoy (13)
23.	US Viesly (13)	1–4	US Les Rues-des-Vignes (10)
24.	AS Neuvilly (13)	1–4	FC Neuville-Saint-Rémy (11)
25.	Saint-Vaast FC (14)	1–7	AS Masnières (11)
26.	FC Saint-Python (13)	0–4	ES Paillencourt-Estrun (10)
27.	ASE Metz-en-Couture (13)	0–2	US Rumilly-en-Cambrésis (12)
28.	US Briastre (14)	0–12	US Beauvois Fontaine (11)
29.	US Saint-Souplet (11)	1–3	OC Avesnois (10)
30.	US Bertry-Clary (12)	0–6	US Saint-Aubert (12)
31.	US Aubigny-au-Bac (12)	1–2	US Quievy (10)
32.	FC Fontaine-au-Bois (11)	0–4	US Walincourt-Selvigny (10)
33.	US Haussy (14)	1–3	Olympique Saint-Ollois (12)
34.	US Ors (14)	2–1	FC Saulzoir (11)
35.	RC Élincourt (14)	4–3	FC Solesmes (12)
36.	US Fontaine-Notre-Dame (12)	0–3	SS Marcoing (13)
37.	FC Pecquencourt (14)	0–7	US Raimbeaucourt (10)
38.	Dechy Sports (13)	1–2	FC Monchecourt (13)
39.	Olympic Marchiennois (11)	1–1 (1–3 p)	USAC Somain (11)
40.	US Auberchicourt (10)	2–3	AS Douai-Lambres Cheminots (12)
41.	US Pays de Sensée et d'Ostrevent (12)	0–2	Olympique Flinois (10)
42.	FC Écaillon (13)	2–0	AS Cuincy (13)
43.	OSC Loffre (13)	0–6	US Pecquencourt (11)
44.	Fenain ES (11)	2–2 (4–5 p)	US Erre-Hornaing (10)
45.	FC Roost-Warendin (12)	2–3	US Frais Marais (12)
46.	Olympique Senséen (10)	2–2 (5–4 p)	DC Lallaing (11)
47.	FC Les Epis (10)	1–4 (Note: FC Les Epis further penalised for fielding a suspended player.)	US Pont Flers (10)
48.	Olympique Landasien (13)	1–1 (3–2 p)	RC Lécluse (11)
49.	UF Anhiers Râches (12)	3–0	ES Bouvignies (12)
50.	US Montigny-en-Ostrevent (14)	7–0	FC Minier Lewardois (14)
51.	FC Bruille-lez-Marchiennes (13)	2–1	US Corbehem (10)
52.	Olympique Marquette (14)	0–2	FC Masny (10)
53.	AS Coutiches (14)	2–4	AS Courchelettes (13)
54.	US Brillon (13)	3–1 (Note: US Brillon penalised for fielding a suspended player. Neuville OSC qualified.)	Neuville OSC (11)
55.	RC Vicq (14)	0–1	Hérin Aubry CLE (12)
56.	AFC Escautpont (10)	1–4	ÉS Crespin (11)
57.	Olympique Thun (14)	1–1 (3–4 p)	ES Mastaing Wavrechain (14)
58.	FC Saultain (13)	0–0 (3–4 p)	IC La Sentinelle (10)
59.	Stade Fresnois (11)	0–4	Douchy FC (11)
60.	SC Lourches (14)	1–0	US Crespin (13)
61.	JS Abscon (12)	1–4	USM Beuvrages (12)
62.	JS Haveluy (12)	– (Note: Match abandoned in the 59th minute, with the scoreline 0–6, as JS Haveuly had insufficient players to continue. CO Trigh-Saint-Léger qualified.)	CO Trith-Saint-Léger (10)
63.	US Quiévrechain (13)	3–4	Saint-Waast CFC (12)
64.	FC Hasnon-Millonfosse (13)	1–1 (5–6 p)	EA Prouvy (10)
65.	AS Petite-Forêt (13)	0–2	Anzin FARC (10)
66.	Thivencelle FC (13)	4–1	FC Flinois (14)
67.	ES Bouchain (12)	1–1 (3–5 p)	RC Rœulx (10)
68.	ES Noyelles-sur-Selle (13)	2–0	US Haulchin (12)
69.	AS Château-l'Abbaye (10)	0–2	FC Condé-Macou (11)
70.	Inter Condé-sur-l'Escaut (12)	0–0 (1–2 p)	ES Sebourg-Estreux (12)
71.	US Hergnies 2025 (14)	0–4	US Verchain-Maugré (12)
72.	US Lieu-Saint-Amand (14)	0–12	Olympique Onnaingeois (10)
73.	AS Artres (13)	1–4	Bruay Sports (10)
74.	ES Hélesmes (14)	0–3	FC Famars (10)

These matches are from the district of Flandres, and were played on 24 August 2025.

First Round Results: Hauts-de-France (Flandres)
Tie no	Home team (Tier)	Score	Away team (Tier)
1.	US Fleurbaix (14)	1–2	FC Bauvin (10)
2.	US Warhem (10)	0–4	US Téteghem (9)
3.	FC Annœullin (9)	2–0	JS Steenwerck (9)
4.	AS Saint-Joseph Hazebrouck (13)	2–2 (4–3 p)	FA Blanc Seau (10)
5.	AS Bersée (9)	5–1 (Note: Tie reversed from original draw.)	ES Frelinghien (13)
6.	FC Deulemont (14)	0–4	SC Bourbourg (9)
7.	AS Avelin (13)	1–3	Flers OS Villeneuve d'Ascq (9)
8.	OSM Lomme (11)	3–1	OSM Sequedin (9)
9.	AS Pont de Nieppe (11)	2–1	FC Wattrelos (9)
10.	OS Fives (9)	1–0	US Monts de Flandre (10)
11.	US Bray-Dunes (12)	0–4	AS Radinghem (9)
12.	FC Craywick (13)	2–2 (1–2 p)	FC Méteren (10)
13.	ES Cappelloise (9)	10–1	AS Marcq (14)
14.	FC Steene (11)	0–3	AS Jean Baptiste Roubaix (11)
15.	FC Colmar Armentières (13)	0–5	Football Saint-Michel Quesnoy (10)
16.	US Attiches (12)	2–0	US Marquillies (12)
17.	ES Cappelle Pont-à-Marcq (12)	2–2 (1–4 p)	US Leffrinckoucke (9)
18.	ASE Allennes-les-Marais (13)	1–7	AS Hellemmes (9)
19.	Entente Mouchin Bachy (12)	0–2	EC Houplines (11)
20.	AS Baisieux Patro (10)	0–0 (4–1 p)	AS Solidarité Lille (12)
21.	Prémesques FC (11)	2–2 (4–3 p)	Olympique Mérignies (10)
22.	US Fretin (11)	8–2	AS Loos Oliveaux (9)
23.	US Maritime (10)	2–2 (7–6 p)	SM Petite-Synthe (10)
24.	US Ronchin (9)	5–4	FC Vieux-Berquin (10)
25.	Hondschoote FC (13)	1–9	ES Lille Louvière Pellevoisin (10)
26.	ES Weppes (12)	5–1	Bac-Sailly Sports (11)
27.	ÉSC Illies Aubers Lorgies (13)	3–3 (3–5 p)	CS Erquinghem-Lys (13)
28.	Sailly Forest Foot (12)	0–4	Leers OF (9)
29.	FC Houtkerque (13)	0–3 (Note: Tie won by means of forfeit.)	Verlinghem Foot (9)
30.	CO Quaëdypre (12)	0–3	US Phalempin (9)
31.	FC Emmerin (13)	2–1	Association Phoenix FC (13)
32.	FC Morin (12)	1–3	US Wallon-Cappel (11)
33.	EC Camphin-en-Pévèle (12)	1–1 (7–8 p)	SC Grand-Fort-Philippe (10)
34.	FC Mons-en-Barœul (10)	4–0	FC Templemars-Vendeville (10)
35.	OC Roubaisien (11)	0–1	AS Templeuve-en-Pévèle (10)
36.	FC Eecke (13)	0–4	Fort-Mardyck OC (10)
37.	AAJ Uxem (11)	1–4	FC Lille Sud (9)
38.	Lille AFS Guinée (12)	3–1	ES Bambecque (12)
39.	Toufflers AF (10)	8–3	CS Bousbecque (10)
40.	JS Ghyveldoise (10)	0–3	EAC Cysoing-Wannehain-Bourghelles (8)
41.	CS La Gorgue (9)	– (Note: Match abandoned in the 44th minute after a fight broke out. Both teams penalised and removed from the competition.)	AS Albeck Grande-Synthe (9)
42.	FC Grande-Synthe (12)	3–3 (1–3 p)	AG Thumeries (10)
43.	US Antillais Lille Métropole (11)	1–0	US Wattrelos (9)
44.	US Yser (10)	6–1	USF Armbouts-Cappel (11)
45.	FC Santes (11)	0–0 (5–4 p)	Union Halluinoise (9)
46.	AS Vieux Lille (13)	4–1	Olympic Hallennois (13)
47.	FC Bierne (11)	3–0	AF Deux-Synthe (12)
48.	Stella Lys (9)	4–4 (4–3 p)	UFC Nieppois (10)
49.	ASC Hazebrouck (11)	2–6	AO Sainghinoise (9)
50.	FC Le Doulieu (10)	1–3	Stade Lezennois (10)
51.	CS Gondecourt (11)	1–2	ES Ennequin-Loos (10)
52.	US Estaires (11)	3–4	JS Lille Wazemmes (9)
53.	ES Roncq (9)	2–1	FC Wattignies (10)
54.	ASC Dockers Dunkerque (10)	0–2	US Houplin-Ancoisne (11)
55.	AJL Caestre (12)	0–3	USF Coudekerque (10)
56.	US Hondeghem (11)	1–2	FC Linselles (9)
57.	AS Usines Dunkerque (13)	0–3	FC La Chapelle-d'Armentières (10)
58.	UJS Cheminots de Tourcoing (11)	4–3	ACS Comines (11)
59.	FC Wambrechies (10)	4–0	FC Rosendaël (10)
60.	RC Herzeele (12)	1–7	US Lille Moulins Carrel (9)

These matches are from the district of Côte d'Opale, and were played on 24 August 2025.

First Round Results: Hauts-de-France (Côte d'Opale)
Tie no	Home team (Tier)	Score	Away team (Tier)
1.	AS Boisjean (14)	0–3	AL Camiers (11)
2.	FC Wizernes (13)	1–6	US Thérouanne (12)
3.	Verton FC (10)	3–1	US Seninghem-Nielles-Vaudringhem (10)
4.	AS Hallines (13)	2–2 (4–2 p)	ES Saint-Omer Rural (9)
5.	AS Setques (15)	1–2	JS Racquinghem (11)
6.	JS Blangy-sur-Ternoise (13)	1–6	FC Nordausques (11)
7.	Union Saint-Loupoise (14)	0–7	US Verchocq-Ergny-Herly (10)
8.	Nieurlet SL (14)	0–3	US Attin (9)
9.	JS Condette (13)	3–1	JS Renescuroise (12)
10.	FC Hucqueliers (14)	6–0	Gouy-Saint-André RC (13)
11.	JS Heuringhem (12)	0–1	Lys Aa FC (9)
12.	US Wail (14)	1–3	Longuenesse Malafoot (13)
13.	AS Nortkerque 95 (9)	5–2	ES Helfaut (10)
14.	ES Herbelles-Pihem-Inghem (14)	0–0 (4–5 p)	US Vieil-Hesdin (12)
15.	AS Esquerdes (13)	2–0	US Brimeux (11)
16.	US Coulomby (14)	0–4	US Quiestède (10)
17.	US Coyecques (13)	0–5	AS Tournehem (10)
18.	US Frencq (12)	1–4	FC Wardrecques (10)
19.	AS Auchy-lès-Hesdin (11)	0–3	AS Campagne-lès-Hesdin (10)
20.	ES Boisdinghem-Zudausques-Mentque-Nortbécourt (12)	12–0 (Note: Tie reversed from original draw.)	SC Aubin (15)
21.	AC Tubersent (12)	1–0	AS Bezinghem (10)
22.	US Bomy (14)	0–4	FC Ecques-Heuringhem (11)
23.	ES Beaurainville (9)	2–1	AS Conchil-le-Temple (10)
24.	AS Fillièvres (12)	1–3	ES Mametz (11)
25.	Entente Steenbecque Morbecque (13)	0–8	FC Wavrans-sur-l'Aa (10)
26.	US Humbert (13)	1–2	FC Merlimont (11)
27.	AS Rang-du-Fliers (12)	0–4 (Note: AS Cucq penalised for fielding a suspended player. AS Rang-du-Fliers qualified.)	AS Cucq (11)
28.	US Créquy-Fressin (10)	1–2	CA Éperlecques (9)
29.	FLC Longfossé (15)	1–2	AS Fruges (12)
30.	Amicale Calais Pascal FC (13)	0–0 (4–5 p)	FC Fréthun (11)
31.	Le Portel GPF (13)	2–1	AS Colembert (11)
32.	US Hardinghen (12)	1–1 (4–2 p)	FC Bonningues-lès-Calais (13)
33.	FC Landrethun-lez-Ardres (14)	3–0	AS Crémarest (13)
34.	FC Wissant (13)	1–3	RC Samer (10)
35.	AS Andres (13)	1–3	US Ambleteuse (10)
36.	AS Balinghem (12)	0–2	FJEP Fort Vert (10)
37.	ES Licques (11)	2–1	ASL Vieil-Moutier La Calique (11)
38.	RC Brêmes-les-Ardres (13)	1–3	FC Campagne-lès-Guines (9)
39.	FC Senlecques (13)	0–2 (Note: US Marais de Gûines penalised for fielding a suspended player. FC Senlecques qualified.)	US Marais de Gûines (10)
40.	ASEP Saint-Inglevert (12)	2–1	AS Surques-Escœuilles (11)
41.	AS Saint-Tricat et Nielles (12)	1–5	CAP Le Portel (10)
42.	FJEP Guemps (14)	0–3	Calais Entente (15)
43.	FC Les Attaques (11)	3–0	US Alquines (12)
44.	AS Dockers Calais (14)	– (Note: Math abandoned in the 87th minute. FC Conti penalised for leaving the field of play. AS Dockers Calais qualified.)	FC Conti (10)
45.	RC Ardrésien (12)	0–2	Amicale Pont-de-Briques (9)
46.	USM Boulogne-sur-Mer (12)	0–6	CO Wimille (11)
47.	AS Portelois (14)	4–3	SO Calais (11)
48.	Fiennes OSC (15)	1–10	FC Calais Caténa (9)
49.	RC Bréquerecque Ostrohove (10)	2–1	Amicale Balzac (11)
50.	FC Thiembronne (14)	0–8	US Landrethun-le-Nord (11)
51.	Athletic Conteville Verte Vallée (13)	1–5	JS Bonningues-lès-Ardres (11)
52.	US Hesdin-l'Abbé (11)	0–0 (5–4 p)	FC Capellois (10)
53.	USC Wierre-Effroy (14)	0–5	Wirwignes FC (14)
54.	RC Lottinghem (13)	0–3	US Bourthes (9)
55.	US Marquise (10)	0–1	USO Rinxent (9)
56.	FC Bellebrune (14)	3–5	US Dannes (13)
57.	ES Oye-Plage (12)	0–1 (Note: ES Oye-Plage further penalised for fielding a suspended player.)	FC Sangatte (10)

These matches are from the district of Aisne, and were played on 24 August 2025.

First Round Results: Hauts-de-France (Aisne)
Tie no	Home team (Tier)	Score	Away team (Tier)
1.	FFC Chéry-lès-Pouilly (11)	0–0 (4–5 p)	SAS Moy de l'Aisne (10)
2.	AS Beaurevoir (10)	4–0	Le Nouvion AC (10)
3.	ES Viry-Noureuil (11)	4–2	CS Aubenton (12)
4.	FC Vaux-Andigny (12)	5–0	AS Martigny (12)
5.	SC Flavy (11)	5–1	FC Essigny-le-Grand (11)
6.	CS Montescourt-Lizerolles (12)	1–6	AS Nouvionnaise (12)
7.	Gouy FC (12)	2–4	RC Bohain (10)
8.	AS Tupigny (12)	1–3	FC Hannapes (10)
9.	FC Frières-Faillouël (13)	1–5	AS Marly-Gomont (13)
10.	FC Lesdins (12)	0–1	La Concorde de Bucy-les-Pierrepont (11)
11.	RC Homblières (13)	0–10	UES Vermand (10)
12.	US Rozoy-sur-Serre (11)	6–0	US Brissy-Hamégicourt (12)
13.	ES Sequehart-Fonsomme-Levergies (12)	1–1 (2–4 p)	Gauchy-Grugies Saint-Quentin FC (10)
14.	US Vadencourt (13)	4–1	L'Arsenal Club Achery-Beautor-Charmes (11)
15.	NES Boué-Étreux (11)	1–2	US Origny Thenelles (12)
16.	ASFA Montbrehain (13)	0–2	Marle Sports (11)
17.	ASC Saint-Michel (12)	1–4	ESUS Buironfosse-La Capelle (10)
18.	FC Watigny (11)	2–2 (4–2 p)	US Aulnois-sous-Laon (11)
19.	SC Fontaine-Notre-Dame (13)	0–5 (Note: AFC Holnon-Fayet penalised for fielding a suspended player. SC Fontaine-Notre-Dame qualified.)	AFC Holnon-Fayet (10)
20.	US des Vallées (12)	11–0	FC Amigny-Rouy (13)
21.	US Sissonne (12)	1–2	Fratnernelle Cheminots Laon (13)
22.	ASA Presles (10)	5–1	US Vallée de l'Ailette (11)
23.	Chambry FC (12)	0–5	ALJN Sinceny (12)
24.	FC Vierzy (11)	0–3	ES Ognes (10)
25.	Union Sud Aisne FC (12)	2–2 (3–4 p) (Note: Union Sud Aisne FC further penalised for fielding a suspended player.)	AS Milonaise Faverolles (10)
26.	FC Billy-sur-Aisne (11)	4–3	UA Fère-en-Tardenois (11)
27.	ASPTT Laon (13)	1–1 (4–2 p)	FC Retz (12)
28.	RC Condé (12)	0–3	US Vervins (10)
29.	FJEP Coincy (11)	5–2	ACSF Vic-sur-Aisne (12)
30.	AS Neuilly-Saint-Front (11)	1–1 (5–4 p) (Note: US Chemin des Dames further penalised for fielding a suspended player.)	US Chemin des Dames (11)
31.	FC 3 Châteaux (10)	2–1	FC Bucy-le-Long (11)
32.	FC Moncelien (12)	2–3	US Anizy Pinon (12)
33.	FC Abbécourt (12)	1–0	BCV FC (10)
34.	US Venizel (11)	0–7	US La Fère (10)
35.	RC Féstieux (13)	1–1 (8–7 p)	AS Barenton-Bugny (13)
36.	Saint-Erme FC (13)	0–2	CS Villeneuve Saint-Germain (11)
37.	US Belleu (10)	3–1	Entente Crouy-Cuffies (10)
38.	Les Carlésiens FC (11)	3–1	US Crépy Vivaise (12)

These matches are from the district of Oise, and were played on 24 August 2025.

First Round Results: Hauts-de-France (Oise)
Tie no	Home team (Tier)	Score	Away team (Tier)
1.	US Sainte-Geneviève (11)	1–5	FC Talmontiers (11)
2.	FC Lavilletertre (10)	6–2 (Note: Tie reversed from original draw.)	AS Hénonville (12)
3.	FC Jouy-sous-Thelle (12)	3–1	SCC Sérifontaine (12)
4.	CS Haudivillers (10)	3–1	AS Campremy/Noyers (11)
5.	FC Saint-Sulpice (12)	2–3	US Cires-lès-Mello (9)
6.	AS Verneuil-en-Halatte (9)	2–0	US Estrées-Saint-Denis (9)
7.	AS Allonne (10)	0–0 (6–5 p)	FC Fontainettes Saint-Aubin (10)
8.	AS Saint-Remy-en-l'Eau (12)	2–1	AS Lachapelle-Saint-Pierre (12)
9.	AS Auneuil (10)	3–0	CSM Mesnil-en-Thelle (11)
10.	USR Saint-Crépin-Ibouvillers (11)	4–3	EFC Dieudonné Puiseux (11)
11.	US Froissy (11)	1–2	US Paillart (12)
12.	ÉC Villers/Bailleul (12)	1–3	US Gaudechart (12)
13.	ES Formerie (10)	1–3	JS Thieux (9)
14.	AS Bornel (12)	5–6	FC Bulles (11)
15.	FC Bellovaques (10)	5–1	US Saint-Germer-de-Fly (11)
16.	AS La Neuville-sur-Oudeuil (11)	0–4	FC Saint-Just des Marais (10)
17.	AF Trie-Château (12)	1–2	FC Angy (10)
18.	AS Montchevreuil (12)	2–5	US Crèvecœur-le-Grand (10)
19.	AS Cheminots Chambly (11)	0–2	US Lamorlaye (9)
20.	ESC Wavignies (11)	0–7 (Note: Grandvilliers AC penalised for fielding a suspended player. ESC Wavignies qualified.)	Grandvilliers AC (9)
21.	AS Ons-en-Bray (11)	3–1	SC Songeons (10)
22.	US Mouy (13)	1–3	FC Esches Fosseuse (9)
23.	FC Saint-Paul (12)	3–2	US Marseille-en-Beauvaisis (12)
24.	RC Blargies (12)	1–2	AS Verderel-lès-Sauqueuse (9)
25.	US Fouquenies (13)	0–2	Fleury SL (12)
26.	FC Tillé (13)	2–2 (3–2 p)	Milly FC (12)
27.	US Bresloise (9)	2–2 (4–5 p)	US Breuil-le-Sec Fitz-James (10)
28.	AS Mareuil-sur-Ourcq (12)	1–3	US Verberie (11)
29.	AS Monchy-Saint-Éloi (12)	0–6	FC Pontpoint Ruraville (9)
30.	AS Beaulieu Écuvilly (11)	3–1	US Baugy Monchy Humières (12)
31.	RC Rethondes (13)	1–5	Tricot OS (10)
32.	US Villers-Saint-Paul (10)	0–1	AS Coye-la-Forêt (10)
33.	FC Muirancourt (12)	2–0	AS Tracy-le-Mont (13)
34.	RC Précy (11)	3–1	FC Boran (12)
35.	US Thourotte Longueil (10)	3–0	AS Saint-Sauveur La Croix Saint-Ouen (10)
36.	AS Neuville-Roy (13)	2–1	AS Laigneville (12)
37.	Dynamo Canly Longueil (10)	4–1	AS Maignelay-Montigny (10)
38.	Rollot AC (12)	2–2 (7–6 p)	ES Compiègne (11)
39.	ASC Val d'Automne (12)	2–2 (4–3 p)	JSAR Compiègne (9)
40.	US Nanteuil FC (12)	2–4	US Plessis-Brion (9)
41.	US Attichy (13)	2–1	FC Carlepont (11)
42.	AS Noailles-Cauvigny (10)	0–3	FC Sacy-Saint Martin (9)
43.	CA Venette (9)	2–2 (4–5 p)	AS Multien (9)
44.	JS Guiscard (11)	7–0	ES Remy (10)
45.	AC Compiègne (11)	1–2	ES Ormoy-Duvy (10)
46.	FC Le Meux (12)	0–2	SC Lamotte Breuil (10)
47.	FC Nointel (12)	2–3	OC Bury (12)
48.	CS Avilly-Saint-Léonard (9)	0–0 (5–4 p)	US Étouy-Agnetz-Bulles (10)
49.	AFC Nogent-sur-Oise (11)	4–2	AS Silly-le-Long (10)
50.	FC Chiry Ourscamp (12)	0–6	US Lassigny (9)

These matches are from the district of Somme, and were played on 24 August 2025.

First Round Results: Hauts-de-France (Somme)
Tie no	Home team (Tier)	Score	Away team (Tier)
1.	AS Vismes Maisniéres (12)	1–6	Olympique Mollienois (12)
2.	US Béthencourt (11)	1–5	Auxiloise (11)
3.	AS Rue (12)	0–6	SC Pont-Remy (9)
4.	SC Bernaville-Prouville (12)	0–8	Olympique Belloy-sur-Somme (11)
5.	Association Longpré-Long-Condé (12)	2–3	Mers AC (11)
6.	AC Aigneville (14)	1–1 (4–3 p)	SSEP Martainneville (12)
7.	AS Long (13)	0–4	ES Chépy (9)
8.	ABC2F Candas (12)	1–4	US Nibas Fressenneville (9)
9.	CO Woignarue (12)	0–2	FC Oisemont (10)
10.	AC Hallencourt (12)	1–1 (4–2 p)	US Quend (11)
11.	AS Hautvillers-Ouville (12)	1–2	ASIC Bouttencourt (10)
12.	JS Cambron (13)	0–3	Avenir Nouvion-en-Ponthieu (10)
13.	US Bouillancourt-en-Sery (13)	– (Note: Match abandoned in the 65th minute, with the scoreline 0–13, as US Bouillancourt-en-Sery had insufficient player to continue. AS Quesnoy-le-Montant qualified.)	AS Quesnoy-le-Montant (10)
14.	US Abbeville (11)	2–2 (4–3 p)	ES Harondel (10)
15.	Entente Sailly-Flibeaucourt Le Titre (12)	1–2	FC Centulois (10)
16.	SEP Blangy-Bouttencourt (11)	1–0	US Lignières-Châtelain (11)
17.	AS Arrest (13)	2–3	Football Dreuillois (12)
18.	US Le Boisle (13)	0–2	CS Crécy-en-Ponthieu (11)
19.	FR Millencourt-en-Ponthieu (14)	0–18	FC Mareuil-Caubert Huchenneville (10)
20.	AS Saint-Sauveur 80 (12)	2–2 (12–13 p)	Avenir de l'Étoile (12)
21.	Olympique Eaucourtois (10)	4–1	US Flesselles (11)
22.	AS La Chaussée-Tirancourt (13)	0–3	AS Picquigny (12)
23.	AS Menchecourt-Thuison-La Bouvaque (11)	3–4	CS Amiens Montières Étouvie (10)
24.	FC Grand-Laviers (12)	2–2 (3–4 p)	US Le Crotoy (11)
25.	ES Deux Vallées (10)	1–1 (6–5 p)	SC Templiers Oisemont (10)
26.	Harbonnières SC (12)	1–1 (7–6 p)	AS Cerisy (11)
27.	ASM Rivery (12)	0–3	FR Englebelmer (10)
28.	AS Glisy (10)	1–2	FC Méaulte (9)
29.	ES Vers-sur-Selle (12)	2–3	US Daours Vecquemont Bussy Aubigny (10)
30.	AS Heudicourt (13)	0–4	ES Cagny (9)
31.	Amiens FC (11)	11–0	Olympique Monchy-Lagache (11)
32.	US Cartigny-Buire (13)	0–4	QCL Sud Amiénois (10)
33.	US Marcelcave (12)	0–7	US Rosières (11)
34.	ES Roye-Damery (13)	1–3	US Roisel (12)
35.	ASL Saveuse (13)	2–2 (4–5 p)	ES Licourt (11)
36.	Amiens AF (11)	3–1	ES Sainte-Emilie/Épehy-le-Ronss (11)
37.	Fienvillers FC (13)	0–2	SC Moreuil (9)
38.	AAE Bray-sur-Somme (12)	0–2	AS Querrieu (10)
39.	AS Davenescourt (14)	0–3	USC Moislains (13)
40.	Rumigny FC (13)	0–3 (Note: Tie won by means of forfeit.)	Olympique Amiénois (10)
41.	FC Plessier (12)	2–2 (3–4 p)	ES Sains/Saint-Fuscien (10)
42.	AS Talmas Picardie Fienvillers (12)	2–0	Fraternelle Ailly-sur-Noye (11)
43.	RC 2 Ercheu (13)	1–1 (3–5 p)	US Ham (10)
44.	AS Prouzel-Plachy (12)	0–9	US Marchélepot (11)
45.	US Méricourt l'Abbé (13)	0–1	AAE Chaulnes (9)
46.	FC Estrées-Mons (12)	1–6	Olympique Le Hamel (11)
47.	ASF Ribemont-sur-Ancre (11)	3–2	US Hangest-en-Santerre (12)
48.	US Sailly-Saillisel (11)	– (Note: Match abandoned in the 25th minute. ES Pigeonnier Amiens penalised, US Sailly-Saillisel qualified.)	ES Pigeonnier Amiens (9)

=== Second round ===
These matches are from the district of Artois, and were played on 31 August 2025, with one replayed on 7 September 2025.

Second Round Results: Hauts-de-France (Artois)
Tie no	Home team (Tier)	Score	Away team (Tier)
1.	AS Tincquizel (10)	1–6	Calonne-Ricouart FC Cite 6 (8)
2.	RC Sains (11)	4–1	US Rouvroy (9)
3.	SCF Achicourt (14)	0–4	USO Bruay-la-Buissière (7)
4.	AS Bapaume-Bertincourt-Vaulx-Vraucourt (12)	0–2	AS Maroeuil (9)
5.	US Arleux-en-Gohelle (12)	0–3	SC Saint-Nicolas-lez-Arras (8)
6.	US Vermelles (8)	2–1	ES Anzin-Saint-Aubin (7)
7.	US Boubers-Conchy (12)	1–0	FC Richebourg (13)
8.	USA Liévin (11)	3–4	CS Avion (7)
9.	FC Givenchy-en-Gohelle (13)	2–2 (5–3 p)	US Croisilles (10)
10.	FC Bouvigny-Boyeffles (13)	1–1 (4–5 p)	US Ruch Carvin (11)
11.	US Annezin (9)	0–7	JS Écourt-Saint-Quentin (8)
12.	OSC Vitry-en-Artois (13)	2–3	US Courcelles (8)
13.	US Grenay (11)	2–5	USO Lens (9)
14.	Olympique Arras (10)	2–0	La Couture FC (9)
15.	ES Sainte-Catherine (10)	1–5	ESD Isbergues (8)
16.	ES Allouagne (13)	3–2	AS Lensoise (9)
17.	USO Drocourt (13)	2–3	AAE Aix-Noulette (10)
18.	US Beuvry (10)	4–0	US Monchy-au-Bois (9)
19.	UC Divion (10)	5–0	AS Courrièrois (11)
20.	US Ablain (11)	2–2 (5–4 p)	US Pas-en-Artois (10)
21.	SC Pro Patria Wingles (8)	0–0 (4–5 p)	USO Meurchin (8)
22.	ES Ficheux (12)	0–2	AFC Libercourtois (11)
23.	AS Frévent (12)	1–7	US Nœux-les-Mines (8)
24.	AJ Ruitz (13)	0–2	ES Laventie (10)
25.	FC Camblain-Châtelain (12)	0–5	AS Brebières (8)
26.	COS Marles-Lozinghem (8)	2–3	US Noyelles-sous-Lens (7)
27.	Stade Héninois (9)	0–6	Olympique Héninois (8)
28.	AS Beaurains (12)	0–6	OS Aire-sur-la-Lys (7)
29.	CS Habarcq (10)	3–0	US Gonnehem-Chocques (12)
30.	FC Cuinchy (14)	0–2	US Billy-Berclau (11)
31.	Atrébate FC (12)	4–0	SC Fouquières (11)
32.	FC Lillers (9)	1–2	US Lestrem (9)
33.	AS Loison (10)	0–4	ES Haisnes (10)
34.	AS Bailleul-Sir-Berthoult (12)	2–6	US Saint-Pol-sur-Ternoise (8)
35.	US Biachoise (8)	2–0	ES Angres (9)
36.	Olympique Liévin (10)	2–2 (4–2 p)	RC Vaudricourt Kennedy (10)
37.	Olympique La Comté Omnisport (14)	– (Note: Match abandoned in the 55th minute, with the scoreline 0–2. US Lapugnoy qualified.)	US Lapugnoy (12)
38.	AAE Évin-Malmaison (13)	– (Note: Match abandoned in the 45th minute. Both teams penalised and removed from the competition.)	CS Diana Liévin (9)
39.	AS Vendin 2000 (13)	1–4	US Cheminots Avion (11)
40.	US Hesdigneul (11)	1–0	Carabiniers Billy-Montigny (8)
41.	RC Labourse (8)	1–0	AFCL Liebaut (8)
42.	FC Méricourt (12)	2–2 (3–4 p)	SC Artésien (9)
43.	US Saint-Maurice Loos-en-Gohelle (10)	0–2	ES Bully-les-Mines (7)
44.	SC Aubigny Savy-Berlette Camblain-l'Abbé (12)	1–4	JF Mazingarbe (11)
45.	AC Noyelles-Godault (10)	4–3	AS Sainte-Barbe-Oignies (9)
46.	AS Violaines (10)	1–2	AS Neuvireuil-Gavrelle (11)
47.	US Houdain (12)	1–1 (5–4 p)	FC La Roupie-Isbergues (11)
48.	ES Douvrin (12)	1–1 (3–4 p) (Note: The original match on 31 August 2025 was abandoned in the 18th minute due to a serious injury. The league ordered it to be replayed.)	ÉS Saint-Laurent-Blangy-Feuchy (10)

These matches are from the district of Escaut, and were played on 31 August 2025.

Second Round Results: Hauts-de-France (Escaut)
Tie no	Home team (Tier)	Score	Away team (Tier)
1.	US Prisches (14)	1–5	AS Trélon (13)
2.	SC Maubeuge (13)	0–3 (Note: Tie won by means of forfeit.)	US Fourmies (7)
3.	AFC Ferrière-la-Petite (11)	2–2 (4–5 p)	AG Solrézienne (10)
4.	CA Sainsois (14)	1–0	AS La Longueville (11)
5.	ES Boussois (10)	3–2	US Cousolre (10)
6.	US Gommegnies-Carnoy (11)	1–1 (8–9 p)	IC Ferrière-la-Grande (11)
7.	FC Aunelle (13)	0–11	US Bousies Forest (11)
8.	FC Leval (14)	0–7	FC Avesnes-sur-Helpe (9)
9.	SA Le Quesnoy (9)	3–2 (Note: Tie reversed from original draw.)	US Bavay (8)
10.	US Glageon (13)	0–2	OSC Assevent (10)
11.	Olympique Maroilles (8)	1–0	AS Hautmont (8)
12.	AFC Colleret (12)	1–5	US Berlaimont (8)
13.	AS Douzies (12)	0–4	Rousies Cœur de Sambre (8)
14.	ASG Louvroil (10)	3–1	Jeumont Marpent FC (9)
15.	SS Marcoing (13)	0–8 (Note: ES Villers-Outréaux penalised for fielding a suspended player. SS Marcoing qualified.)	ES Villers-Outréaux (7)
16.	US Walincourt-Selvigny (10)	0–2	US Beauvois Fontaine (11)
17.	SC Le Cateau (10)	0–1	ES Caudry (8)
18.	Olympique Saint-Ollois (12)	2–1	AS Thun-l'Évêque (12)
19.	AS Vendegies-Escarmain (11)	2–2 (2–4 p)	FC Iwuy (9)
20.	FC Neuville-Saint-Rémy (11)	2–2 (5–3 p)	US Rumilly-en-Cambrésis (12)
21.	RC Élincourt (14)	1–1 (6–5 p)	US Ors (14)
22.	OM Cambrai Amérique (9)	1–1 (5–3 p)	CAS Escaudœuvres (8)
23.	US Saint-Aubert (12)	0–2	OC Avesnois (10)
24.	AS Masnières (11)	0–3	Entente Ligny/Olympique Caullery (9)
25.	US Quievy (10)	0–1	ES Paillencourt-Estrun (10)
26.	US Les Rues-des-Vignes (10)	2–0	FC Provillois (9)
27.	USAC Somain (11)	3–3 (4–2 p)	AS Douai-Lambres Cheminots (12)
28.	US Pecquencourt (11)	1–2	US Pont Flers (10)
29.	UF Anhiers Râches (12)	0–2	US Aubygeoise (9)
30.	Olympique Flinois (10)	3–0	US Erre-Hornaing (10)
31.	SC Aniche (9)	2–0	AEF Leforest (8)
32.	ESM Hamel (9)	4–2	FC Férin (9)
33.	SC Douai (9)	0–4	AS Sin-le-Noble (9)
34.	US Raimbeaucourt (10)	0–6	ES Lambresienne (7)
35.	US Montigny-en-Ostrevent (14)	2–1	FC Masny (10)
36.	AS Beuvry-la-Forêt (8)	1–1 (3–4 p)	SC Guesnain (8)
37.	Olympique Landasien (13)	1–2	Olympique Senséen (10)
38.	US Frais Marais (12)	1–3	FC Écaillon (13)
39.	FC Monchecourt (13)	1–0	FC Bruille-lez-Marchiennes (13)
40.	AS Courchelettes (13)	0–16	Stade Orchésien (7)
41.	FC Condé-Macou (11)	1–12	US Hordain (8)
42.	Saint-Waast CFC (12)	2–1	USM Beuvrages (12)
43.	Olympique Onnaingeois (10)	0–0 (4-5 p)	Douchy FC (11)
44.	ES Mastaing Wavrechain (14)	0–9	ÉS Crespin (11)
45.	Vieux Condé Foot (9)	0–5	FC Raismes (7)
46.	FC Famars (10)	4–2	FC Quarouble (9)
47.	CO Trith-Saint-Léger (10)	4–2	US Aulnoy (8)
48.	ES Noyelles-sur-Selle (13)	1–10	Anzin FARC (10)
49.	Thivencelle FC (13)	2–1	Saint-Saulve Football (9)
50.	IC La Sentinelle (10)	1–2	EA Prouvy (10)
51.	Hérin Aubry CLE (12)	0–1	Bruay Sports (10)
52.	SC Lourches (14)	1–8	FC Lecelles-Rosult (9)
53.	Neuville OSC (11)	0–12	AS Summer Club Valenciennes (8)
54.	ES Sebourg-Estreux (12)	0–3	US Escaudain Denain (7)
55.	US Verchain-Maugré (12)	1–1 (3–4 p)	RC Rœulx (10)

These matches are from the district of Flandres, and were played on 31 August 2025.

Second Round Results: Hauts-de-France (Flandres)
Tie no	Home team (Tier)	Score	Away team (Tier)
1.	Football Saint-Michel Quesnoy (10)	0–8	SC Hazebrouck (7)
2.	CS Erquinghem-Lys (13)	0–4	USCC Saint-Pol-sur-Mer (8)
3.	ES Roncq (9)	1–4	ES Genech (7)
4.	US Fretin (11)	1–2	US Provin (8)
5.	OSM Lomme (11)	1–1 (3–2 p)	Lille AFS Guinée (12)
6.	AS Templeuve-en-Pévèle (10)	1–2	US Lesquin (7)
7.	ES Cappelloise (9)	2–3	FC La Chapelle-d'Armentières (10)
8.	FC Linselles (9)	1–3 (Note: Tie reversed from original draw.)	FC Madeleinois (8)
9.	EAC Cysoing-Wannehain-Bourghelles (8)	2–1	Faches-Thumesnil FC (8)
10.	ES Weppes (12)	2–4	US Antillais Lille Métropole (11)
11.	US Wallon-Cappel (11)	1–1 (5–4 p)	US Lille Moulins Carrel (9)
12.	US Leffrinckoucke (9)	0–2	CG Haubourdin (8)
13.	AS Vieux Lille (13)	0–5	US Maritime (10)
14.	Entente Mouchin Bachy (12)	1–1 (5–4 p)	FC Mons-en-Barœul (10)
15.	Flers OS Villeneuve d'Ascq (9)	2–4	FC Wambrechies (10)
16.	FC Bauvin (10)	0–2	US Ascq (8)
17.	FC Lille Sud (9)	0–1	AO Sainghinoise (9)
18.	AS Jean Baptiste Roubaix (11)	1–3	US Phalempin (9)
19.	FC Emmerin (13)	0–4	ES Lille Louvière Pellevoisin (10)
20.	FC Bierne (11)	2–5	Olympique Hémois FC (8)
21.	USF Coudekerque (10)	0–0 (4–3 p)	Toufflers AF (10)
22.	FC Méteren (10)	1–6	AS Dunkerque Sud (8)
23.	SC Bourbourg (9)	0–5	ES Mouvaux (8)
24.	US Houplin-Ancoisne (11)	0–0 (2–5 p)	AS Hellemmes (9)
25.	FC Annœullin (9)	2–4	FC Loon-Plage (7)
26.	FC Santes (11)	1–10	FC Seclin (7)
27.	Verlinghem Foot (9)	0–0 (5–4 p)	USM Merville (7)
28.	US Attiches (12)	0–5	RC Bergues (9)
29.	Bye (round 1 tie 41)	–	JS Lille Wazemmes (9)
30.	AS Bersée (9)	2–3	EC Anstaing-Chéreng-Tressin-Gruson (8)
31.	AS Pont de Nieppe (11)	1–7	FC Dunkerque-Malo Plage (7)
32.	Stella Lys (9)	1–1 (3–4 p)	SC Bailleulois (8)
33.	US Téteghem (9)	1–1 (7–6 p)	JA Armentières (7)
34.	OS Fives (9)	2–1	US Portugais Roubaix Tourcoing (7)
35.	SC Grand-Fort-Philippe (10)	3–5	US Yser (10)
36.	AS Saint-Joseph Hazebrouck (13)	0–6	Mons AC (8)
37.	AS Baisieux Patro (10)	0–3	US Esquelbecq (7)
38.	ES Ennequin-Loos (10)	1–2	FA Neuvilloise (7)
39.	AG Thumeries (10)	5–4	UJS Cheminots de Tourcoing (11)
40.	US Ronchin (9)	2–2 (4–5 p)	UF Lambersart (7)
41.	Stade Lezennois (10)	1–0	US Saint-André (8)
42.	AS Radinghem (9)	4–2	US Pérenchies (9)
43.	Fort-Mardyck OC (10)	3–0	Prémesques FC (11)
44.	Leers OF (9)	1–1 (3–5 p)	Marquette Football Flandres (8)

These matches are from the district of Côte d'Opale, and were played on 31 August 2025.

Second Round Results: Hauts-de-France (Côte d'Opale)
Tie no	Home team (Tier)	Score	Away team (Tier)
1.	AS Fruges (12)	0–6	ES Arques (8)
2.	Wirwignes FC (14)	1–1 (2–4 p)	FC Nordausques (11)
3.	Le Portel GPF (13)	0–2	SC Coquelles (7)
4.	FC Ecques-Heuringhem (11)	0–7	FC Saint-Martin-lez-Tatinghem (8)
5.	Le Touquet AC (7)	0–0 (3–5 p)	AS Marck (7)
6.	AS Tournehem (10)	1–0 (Note: Tie reversed from original draw.)	CS Watten (9)
7.	USO Rinxent (9)	6–2	FC Sangatte (10)
8.	AS Berck (8)	4–1	ES Calaisis Coulogne (9)
9.	FJEP Fort Vert (10)	0–2	AS Wimereux (8)
10.	AS Dockers Calais (14)	2–8	AS Audruicq (9)
11.	AS Esquerdes (13)	0–14	US Blaringhem (9)
12.	FC Les Attaques (11)	0–1	JS Desvroise (9)
13.	US Attin (9)	1–2	US Bourthes (9)
14.	JS Condette (13)	3–3 (4–3 p)	FC Hucqueliers (14)
15.	FCP Blendecques (9)	0–0 (7–6 p)	ESL Boulogne-sur-Mer (9)
16.	AC Tubersent (12)	1–2	AF Étaples Haute Ville (9)
17.	US Thérouanne (12)	1–3	FC Calais Caténa (9)
18.	AL Camiers (11)	0–3	US Hesdin-l'Abbé (11)
19.	AS Campagne-lès-Hesdin (10)	1–0	FC Fréthun (11)
20.	ES Mametz (11)	3–2	ES Boisdinghem-Zudausques-Mentque-Nortbécourt (12)
21.	FC Landrethun-lez-Ardres (14)	0–7	AS Étaples (8)
22.	CA Éperlecques (9)	1–1 (9–8 p)	FC Recques-sur-Hem (9)
23.	ES Guînes (9)	0–2	Olympique Lumbrois (9)
24.	FC Senlecques (13)	0–10	AS Outreau (7)
25.	JS Racquinghem (11)	2–0	US Vieil-Hesdin (12)
26.	Olympique Hesdin-Marconne (9)	0–5	JS Longuenesse (7)
27.	US Hardinghen (12)	1–8	ES Roquetoire (9)
28.	ASEP Saint-Inglevert (12)	0–9	AS Nortkerque 95 (9)
29.	AS Hallines (13)	0–1	US Landrethun-le-Nord (11)
30.	Calais Entente (15)	0–6	Calais Beau-Marais (7)
31.	FC Merlimont (11)	1–4	AS Rang-du-Fliers (12)
32.	Olympique Saint-Martin Boulogne (8)	2–1	Pays de la Lys (9)
33.	Amicale Pont-de-Briques (9)	3–0	Lys Aa FC (9)
34.	RC Samer (10)	4–0	FC Wardrecques (10)
35.	Verton FC (10)	1–5	Éclair Neufchâtel-Hardelot (9)
36.	Longuenesse Malafoot (13)	0–6	US Blériot-Plage (8)
37.	CO Wimille (11)	1–5	US Ambleteuse (10)
38.	AS Portelois (14)	0–3	FC Campagne-lès-Guines (9)
39.	ES Beaurainville (9)	3–1	RC Bréquerecque Ostrohove (10)
40.	ES Licques (11)	0–1	ES Saint-Léonard (9)
41.	US Dannes (13)	0–1	US Verchocq-Ergny-Herly (10)
42.	JS Bonningues-lès-Ardres (11)	0–2	US Montreuil (7)
43.	FC Wavrans-sur-l'Aa (10)	1–4	Stade Portelois (8)
44.	US Quiestède (10)	3–0	CAP Le Portel (10)

These matches are from the district of Aisne, and were played on 30 and 31 August 2025.

Second Round Results: Hauts-de-France (Aisne)
Tie no	Home team (Tier)	Score	Away team (Tier)
1.	US Vadencourt (13)	0–3	AS Beaurevoir (10)
2.	SC Fontaine-Notre-Dame (13)	2–12	US Ribemont Mezieres FC (8)
3.	AS Marly-Gomont (13)	0–2	ICS Créçois (9)
4.	RC Homblières (13)	4–4 (3–2 p)	La Concorde de Bucy-les-Pierrepont (11)
5.	ESUS Buironfosse-La Capelle (10)	1–1 (3–4 p) (Note: Tie reversed from original draw.)	ES Viry-Noureuil (11)
6.	FC Hannapes (10)	0–3	US Buire-Hirson-Thiérache (8)
7.	SAS Moy de l'Aisne (10)	1–6	Saint-Quentin Football (9)
8.	Marle Sports (11)	2–2 (4–3 p)	RC Bohain (10)
9.	FC Vaux-Andigny (12)	0–2	FC Fresnoy Fonsomme (10)
10.	AS Nouvionnaise (12)	0–5	US Guise (9)
11.	US Origny Thenelles (12)	0–6	Gauchy-Grugies Saint-Quentin FC (10)
12.	FC Watigny (11)	1–6	SC Origny-en-Thiérache (9)
13.	US Rozoy-sur-Serre (11)	1–3	Stade Portugais Saint-Quentin (8)
14.	SC Flavy (11)	2–2 (5–6 p)	US Seboncourt (9)
15.	US Vervins (10)	0–2	US Chauny (7)
16.	Les Carlésiens FC (11)	1–1 (3–5 p)	International Château-Thierry Étampes (8)
17.	FJEP Coincy (11)	0–2	CSO Athies (10)
18.	AS Milonaise Faverolles (10)	3–2	US Guignicourt (9)
19.	ALJN Sinceny (12)	3–0	CS Villeneuve Saint-Germain (11)
20.	FC Billy-sur-Aisne (11)	0–9	Septmonts OC (9)
21.	AS Neuilly-Saint-Front (11)	3–2	US La Fère (10)
22.	Fratnernelle Cheminots Laon (13)	2–9	Tergnier FC (8)
23.	FC Courmelles (9)	3–0	FC 3 Châteaux (10)
24.	FC Abbécourt (12)	0–2	US Bruyères-et-Montbérault (9)
25.	US des Vallées (12)	0–1	US Prémontré Saint-Gobain (8)
26.	US Anizy Pinon (12)	1–0	ASPTT Laon (13)
27.	RC Féstieux (13)	1–7	US Belleu (10)
28.	ES Ognes (10)	1–1 (4–3 p)	ASA Presles (10)

These matches are from the district of Oise, and were played on 31 August 2025.

Second Round Results: Hauts-de-France (Oise)
Tie no	Home team (Tier)	Score	Away team (Tier)
1.	FC Bulles (11)	0–2	US Crépy-en-Valois (8)
2.	US Lassigny (9)	0–0 (3–1 p)	USM Senlisienne (7)
3.	Dynamo Canly Longueil (10)	0–1	US Méru Sandricourt (7)
4.	AFC Nogent-sur-Oise (11)	1–2	FC Lavilletertre (10)
5.	FC Muirancourt (12)	0–11	US Chevrières-Grandfresnoy (7)
6.	US ASPTT Portugais Beauvais (8)	0–4	US Nogent (8)
7.	US Attichy (13)	0–2	FC Angy (10)
8.	USR Saint-Crépin-Ibouvillers (11)	3–1	Rollot AC (12)
9.	JS Thieux (9)	0–0 (4–5 p)	US Breteuil (7)
10.	FC Jouy-sous-Thelle (12)	1–2	FC Saint-Just des Marais (10)
11.	Fleury SL (12)	3–4	AS Auneuil (10)
12.	Standard FC Montataire (8)	3–2	Hermes-Berthecourt AC (9)
13.	FC Tillé (13)	4–3	US Verberie (11)
14.	FC Talmontiers (11)	1–4	SC Saint-Just-en-Chaussée (8)
15.	AS Allonne (10)	0–4	FCJ Noyon (8)
16.	US Breuil-le-Sec Fitz-James (10)	5–0	JS Guiscard (11)
17.	US Gaudechart (12)	3–3 (7–8 p)	US Crèvecœur-le-Grand (10)
18.	AS Verderel-lès-Sauqueuse (9)	1–1 (3–4 p)	FC Pontpoint Ruraville (9)
19.	SC Lamotte Breuil (10)	1–1 (6–5 p)	FC Bellovaques (10)
20.	FC Saint-Paul (12)	1–2	US Margny-lès-Compiègne (8)
21.	CS Haudivillers (10)	0–4	FC Béthisy (8)
22.	OC Bury (12)	1–3	AS Ons-en-Bray (11)
23.	FC Sacy-Saint Martin (9)	1–6	FC Liancourt-Clermont (7)
24.	US Gouvieux (7)	4–0	US Ribécourt (8)
25.	ES Ormoy-Duvy (10)	0–5	US Choisy-au-Bac (7)
26.	AS Orry-La-Chapelle-Plailly (10)	0–7 (Note: US Saint-Maximin penalised for fielding a suspended player. AS Orry-La-Chapelle-Plailly qualified.)	US Saint-Maximin (7)
27.	AS Multien (9)	1–3	CS Avilly-Saint-Léonard (9)
28.	US Paillart (12)	1–1 (3–2 p)	ESC Wavignies (11)
29.	ASC Val d'Automne (12)	3–1	Tricot OS (10)
30.	AS Saint-Remy-en-l'Eau (12)	1–2	US Cires-lès-Mello (9)
31.	AS Verneuil-en-Halatte (9)	0–7	AFC Creil (7)
32.	FC Esches Fosseuse (9)	2–1	USE Saint-Leu d'Esserent (8)
33.	RC Précy (11)	3–2	AS Beaulieu Écuvilly (11)
34.	AS Neuville-Roy (13)	0–3	AS Coye-la-Forêt (10)
35.	US Lamorlaye (9)	3–0	US Plessis-Brion (9)
36.	US Thourotte Longueil (10)	3–3 (3–5 p)	Stade Ressontois (9)
37.	US Balagny-Saint-Epin (8)	3–3 (4–2 p)	CS Chaumont-en-Vexin (8)

These matches are from the district of Somme, and were played on 31 August 2025.

Second Round Results: Hauts-de-France (Somme)
Tie no	Home team (Tier)	Score	Away team (Tier)
1.	Mers AC (11)	0–5	FC Porto Portugais Amiens (7)
2.	Avenir de l'Étoile (12)	0–13	Poix-Blangy-Croixrault FC (9)
3.	ES Deux Vallées (10)	1–2	RC Doullens (8)
4.	FC Mareuil-Caubert Huchenneville (10)	4–1	FC Centulois (10)
5.	US Nibas Fressenneville (9)	2–0	FC Oisemont (10)
6.	AS Picquigny (12)	0–7	AS Gamaches (8)
7.	AC Hallencourt (12)	0–2	ES Chépy (9)
8.	CS Crécy-en-Ponthieu (11)	0–3	SC Pont-Remy (9)
9.	Olympique Belloy-sur-Somme (11)	1–2	US Friville-Escarbotin (9)
10.	JS Miannay-Moyenneville-Lambercourt (9)	2–0	FC Saint-Valéry Baie de Somme Sud (9)
11.	Olympique Mollienois (12)	1–6	SC Abbeville (7)
12.	SEP Blangy-Bouttencourt (11)	1–3	AS Airaines-Allery (9)
13.	Football Dreuillois (12)	1–4	FC Ailly-sur-Somme Samara (9)
14.	AS Quesnoy-le-Montant (10)	0–0 (4–2 p)	SC Flixecourt (8)
15.	AC Aigneville (14)	0–2	Avenir Nouvion-en-Ponthieu (10)
16.	QCL Sud Amiénois (10)	2–1	US Le Crotoy (11)
17.	ASIC Bouttencourt (10)	5–0	US Abbeville (11)
18.	Auxiloise (11)	1–1 (6–5 p)	Olympique Eaucourtois (10)
19.	AS Talmas Picardie Fienvillers (12)	1–3	Montdidier AC (8)
20.	US Rosières (11)	4–0	FC Méaulte (9)
21.	Olympique Le Hamel (11)	1–1 (5–4 p)	SC Moreuil (9)
22.	ASF Ribemont-sur-Ancre (11)	1–3	Olympique Amiénois (10)
23.	US Sailly-Saillisel (11)	1–0	ES Cagny (9)
24.	AC Amiens (8)	0–0 (4–3 p)	US Roye-Noyon (7)
25.	AS Villers-Bretonneux (9)	0–0 (5–6 p)	RC Salouël Saleux (7)
26.	USC Moislains (13)	0–11	US Daours Vecquemont Bussy Aubigny (10)
27.	US Ouvriere Albert (9)	2–5	AS du Pays Neslois (8)
28.	CS Amiens Montières Étouvie (10)	2–4	RC Amiens (9)
29.	AAE Chaulnes (9)	1–1 (4–3 p)	US Ham (10)
30.	Amiens FC (11)	0–5	Amiens RIF (9)
31.	Harbonnières SC (12)	0–4	ES Sains/Saint-Fuscien (10)
32.	US Marchélepot (11)	1–0	Entente CAFC Péronne (9)
33.	US Roisel (12)	2–6	FR Englebelmer (10)
34.	ES Licourt (11)	2–2 (5–6 p) (Note: Amiens AF penalised for fielding a player not listed on the team sheet. ES Licourt qualified.)	Amiens AF (11)
35.	FC La Montoye (9)	1–0 (Note: Tie reversed from original draw.)	AS Querrieu (10)

=== Third round ===
These matches were played on 13, 14 and 21 September 2025.

Third Round Results: Hauts-de-France (Artois)
Tie no	Home team (Tier)	Score	Away team (Tier)
1.	RC Rœulx (10)	0–6	FA Neuvilloise (7)
2.	ES Paillencourt-Estrun (10)	0–2	SC Coquelles (7)
3.	RC Sains (11)	0–3	AS Berck (8)
4.	US Ambleteuse (10)	0–4	Olympique Marcquois Football (6)
5.	Bruay Sports (10)	0–0 (4–2 p)	ES Laventie (10)
6.	USO Lens (9)	3–2	ES Beaurainville (9)
7.	US Hesdigneul (11)	3–0	AS Audruicq (9)
8.	JS Condette (13)	0–2	US Pont Flers (10)
9.	FCP Blendecques (9)	1–2	US Téteghem (9)
10.	US Hesdin-l'Abbé (11)	0–6	FC Loon-Plage (7)
11.	AS Étaples (8)	3–0	AS Radinghem (9)
12.	OSC Assevent (10)	1–6	Verlinghem Foot (9)
13.	ES Mametz (11)	0–7	FC Dunkerque-Malo Plage (7)
14.	ES Boussois (10)	0–0 (4–3 p)	Olympique Hémois FC (8)
15.	Olympique Senséen (10)	1–6 (Note: Match originally scheduled for 14 September 2025, postponed to 21 September 2025.)	JS Desvroise (9)
16.	AG Solrézienne (10)	4–1	US Blaringhem (9)
17.	US Montreuil (7)	1–0	Olympique Saint-Martin Boulogne (8)
18.	Calais Beau-Marais (7)	3–2	Stade Portelois (8)
19.	US Billy-Berclau (11)	2–1	US Bourthes (9)
20.	Fort-Mardyck OC (10)	0–2	AS Dunkerque Sud (8)
21.	EC Houplines (11)	0–3	Olympique Grande-Synthe (6)
22.	AS Campagne-lès-Hesdin (10)	0–4	Stade Béthunois (6)
23.	AS Wimereux (8)	2–2 (4–2 p)	AS Maroeuil (9)
24.	US Ruch Carvin (11)	3–2	US Provin (8)
25.	US Blériot-Plage (8)	0–0 (4–5 p)	FC Saint-Martin-lez-Tatinghem (8)
26.	US Yser (10)	1–3	USCC Saint-Pol-sur-Mer (8)
27.	FC Calais Caténa (9)	0–3	AS Steenvorde (6)
28.	FC Campagne-lès-Guines (9)	0–4	OS Aire-sur-la-Lys (7)
29.	AO Sainghinoise (9)	1–4	US Gravelines (6)
30.	US Wallon-Cappel (11)	0–6	AS Marck (7)
31.	USF Coudekerque (10)	0–1	Olympique Héninois (8)
32.	US Maritime (10)	0–2	JS Longuenesse (7)
33.	Atrébate FC (12)	3–0	US Verchocq-Ergny-Herly (10)
34.	FC Nordausques (11)	0–8	RC Calais (6)
35.	FC Famars (10)	1–4	US Esquelbecq (7)
36.	AS Rang-du-Fliers (12)	0–9	ESD Isbergues (8)
37.	SC Bailleulois (8)	0–2	RC Bergues (9)
38.	US Lestrem (9)	0–2	AS Outreau (7)
39.	ES Arques (8)	0–0 (5–4 p)	SC Artésien (9)
40.	AS Nortkerque 95 (9)	2–4	US Tourquennoise (6)
41.	US Ablain (11)	0–1	ES Cappelloise (9)
42.	EA Prouvy (10)	1–0	USO Rinxent (9)
43.	US Lesquin (7)	0–2	US Saint-Omer (6)
44.	ES Haisnes (10)	1–3	FC Madeleinois (8)
45.	JF Mazingarbe (11)	2–4	Anzin FARC (10)
46.	RC Samer (10)	0–8	US Vermelles (8)
47.	US Phalempin (9)	0–1	ES Mouvaux (8)
48.	US Cheminots Avion (11)	3–1	Stade Lezennois (10)
49.	US Quiestède (10)	3–1	OSM Lomme (11)
50.	US Beuvry (10)	1–3	SC Aniche (9)
51.	Éclair Neufchâtel-Hardelot (9)	3–2	Olympique Lumbrois (9)
52.	AS Hellemmes (9)	3–0	FC Wambrechies (10)
53.	US Houdain (12)	2–3	JS Écourt-Saint-Quentin (8)
54.	CA Éperlecques (9)	1–0	FC Seclin (7)
55.	CS Avion (7)	3–2	EC Anstaing-Chéreng-Tressin-Gruson (8)
56.	US Boubers-Conchy (12)	3–1	AF Étaples Haute Ville (9)
57.	OS Fives (9)	0–0 (3–2 p)	SC Hazebrouck (7)
58.	ES Allouagne (13)	4–0	JS Racquinghem (11)
59.	US Les Rues-des-Vignes (10)	0–1	USO Bruay-la-Buissière (7)
60.	ES Saint-Léonard (9)	1–2	Mons AC (8)
61.	UC Divion (10)	2–2 (2–3 p)	US Ascq (8)
62.	US Landrethun-le-Nord (11)	2–3	ES Bully-les-Mines (7)
63.	FC Lecelles-Rosult (9)	2–1	Entente Ligny/Olympique Caullery (9)
64.	AFC Libercourtois (11)	2–2 (3–4 p)	US Antillais Lille Métropole (11)
65.	FC Givenchy-en-Gohelle (13)	1–1 (4–1 p)	AS Tournehem (10)
66.	Marquette Football Flandres (8)	4–1	Amicale Pont-de-Briques (9)
67.	US Lapugnoy (12)	0–3	EAC Cysoing-Wannehain-Bourghelles (8)
68.	ES Genech (7)	0–2	RC Roubaix (6)
69.	UF Lambersart (7)	0–0 (3–5 p)	RC Labourse (8)
70.	ÉS Saint-Laurent-Blangy-Feuchy (10)	1–6	FC Montigny-en-Gohelle (6)
71.	AAE Aix-Noulette (10)	2–1	USO Meurchin (8)
72.	ES Roquetoire (9)	1–2	CS Habarcq (10)
73.	ES Lille Louvière Pellevoisin (10)	2–3	SC Guesnain (8)
74.	CG Haubourdin (8)	4–1	JS Lille Wazemmes (9)
75.	AG Thumeries (10)	1–4	Stade Orchésien (7)
76.	Olympique Flinois (10)	0–3	Bondues FC (6)
77.	Bye (round 2 Artois tie 38)	–	AS Neuvireuil-Gavrelle (11)
78.	AS Summer Club Valenciennes (8)	1–1 (4–5 p)	US Biachoise (8)
79.	AC Noyelles-Godault (10)	0–3	US Lamorlaye (9)
80.	FR Englebelmer (10)	0–3	AS Gamaches (8)
81.	SC Saint-Nicolas-lez-Arras (8)	4–0	US Friville-Escarbotin (9)
82.	US Paillart (12)	0–7	US Nogent (8)
83.	Calonne-Ricouart FC Cite 6 (8)	1–0	ESC Longueau (6)
84.	FC Écaillon (13)	0–5	SC Abbeville (7)
85.	AS Neuilly-Saint-Front (11)	0–2	US Breteuil (7)
86.	AS Airaines-Allery (9)	0–1	FC Iwuy (9)
87.	CS Avilly-Saint-Léonard (9)	2–0	CSO Athies (10)
88.	Olympique Le Hamel (11)	0–2	US Courcelles (8)
89.	ÉS Crespin (11)	0–2	US Prémontré Saint-Gobain (8)
90.	Thivencelle FC (13)	0–0 (4–3 p)	Olympique Liévin (10)
91.	Poix-Blangy-Croixrault FC (9)	1–2	US Noyelles-sous-Lens (7)
92.	FC Porto Portugais Amiens (7)	7–1	US Balagny-Saint-Epin (8)
93.	AS Quesnoy-le-Montant (10)	0–5	US Pays de Cassel (5)
94.	AS Sin-le-Noble (9)	13–0	AS Coye-la-Forêt (10)
95.	US Bruyères-et-Montbérault (9)	0–1	Arras FA (6)
96.	AS Ons-en-Bray (11)	0–3	US Méru Sandricourt (7)
97.	RC Précy (11)	2–7	US Aubygeoise (9)
98.	FC Pontpoint Ruraville (9)	1–1 (3–2 p)	RC Doullens (8)
99.	Tergnier FC (8)	2–0	FC Ailly-sur-Somme Samara (9)
100.	Avenir Nouvion-en-Ponthieu (10)	0–4	US Camon (6)
101.	ES Chépy (9)	1–0	AS Orry-La-Chapelle-Plailly (10)
102.	AC Amiens (8)	1–3	US Gouvieux (7)
103.	US Beauvois Fontaine (11)	0–2	US Nibas Fressenneville (9)
104.	FC Neuville-Saint-Rémy (11)	0–1	RC Salouël Saleux (7)
105.	US Belleu (10)	2–1	Olympique Arras (10)
106.	ASIC Bouttencourt (10)	2–1	Standard FC Montataire (8)
107.	AS Auneuil (10)	2–1	FC Courmelles (9)
108.	Auxiloise (11)	5–3	Septmonts OC (9)
109.	US Montigny-en-Ostrevent (14)	1–6	ES Ognes (10)
110.	ASC Val d'Automne (12)	0–10	Internationale Soissonnaise (6)
111.	FC Saint-Just des Marais (10)	1–2	USR Saint-Crépin-Ibouvillers (11)
112.	AS Milonaise Faverolles (10)	0–4	AFC Creil (7)
113.	FC Béthisy (8)	1–2	JS Miannay-Moyenneville-Lambercourt (9)
114.	US Daours Vecquemont Bussy Aubigny (10)	6–1	US Breuil-le-Sec Fitz-James (10)
115.	International Château-Thierry Étampes (8)	1–1 (0–3 p)	US Nœux-les-Mines (8)
116.	FC Tillé (13)	0–5	ESM Hamel (9)
117.	US Saint-Pol-sur-Ternoise (8)	3–1	AFC Compiègne (6)
118.	Saint-Waast CFC (12)	0–3	Gauchy-Grugies Saint-Quentin FC (10)
119.	US Seboncourt (9)	0–2	ES Lambresienne (7)
120.	Rousies Cœur de Sambre (8)	1–0	FC Liancourt-Clermont (7)
121.	Entente CAFC Péronne (9)	0–3	Écureuils Itancourt-Neuville (6)
122.	RC Amiens (9)	2–4	Montdidier AC (8)
123.	US Guise (9)	0–0 (3–1 p)	US Fourmies (7)
124.	SC Pont-Remy (9)	2–1	Olympique Maroilles (8)
125.	SC Origny-en-Thiérache (9)	5–2	SC Lamotte Breuil (10)
126.	ASG Louvroil (10)	0–3	US Ribemont Mezieres FC (8)
127.	AAE Chaulnes (9)	0–2	FC Raismes (7)
128.	CA Sainsois (14)	0–4	IC Ferrière-la-Grande (11)
129.	SC Saint-Just-en-Chaussée (8)	3–0	ICS Créçois (9)
130.	AS Brebières (8)	0–0 (3–4 p)	US Laon (6)
131.	AS Beaurevoir (10)	2–2 (5–4 p)	USAC Somain (11)
132.	Olympique Amiénois (10)	3–0	FC Fresnoy Fonsomme (10)
133.	US Sailly-Saillisel (11)	1–2	FC Avesnes-sur-Helpe (9)
134.	US Bousies Forest (11)	2–2 (4–3 p)	OM Cambrai Amérique (9)
135.	Saint-Quentin Football (9)	1–2	US Buire-Hirson-Thiérache (8)
136.	ES Caudry (8)	2–1	US Cires-lès-Mello (9)
137.	ALJN Sinceny (12)	0–4	US Chauny (7)
138.	CO Trith-Saint-Léger (10)	7–0	ES Licourt (11)
139.	FC Monchecourt (13)	1–6	AC Cambrai (6)
140.	Stade Portugais Saint-Quentin (8)	3–1	FC La Montoye (9)
141.	AS Trélon (13)	1–4 (Note: Tie reversed from original draw.)	SS Marcoing (13)
142.	AS du Pays Neslois (8)	2–2 (5–3 p)	US Pont Sainte-Maxence (6)
143.	FC Mareuil-Caubert Huchenneville (10)	0–5	US Choisy-au-Bac (7)
144.	ES Sains/Saint-Fuscien (10)	0–0 (4–3 p)	US Margny-lès-Compiègne (8)
145.	SA Le Quesnoy (9)	1–7	US Maubeuge (6)
146.	FC Lavilletertre (10)	1–0	FC Esches Fosseuse (9)
147.	FC Angy (10)	0–3	US Chevrières-Grandfresnoy (7)
148.	RC Élincourt (14)	0–8	US Lassigny (9)
149.	Douchy FC (11)	0–1	ES Viry-Noureuil (11)
150.	Amiens RIF (9)	4–1	QCL Sud Amiénois (10)
151.	Marle Sports (11)	0–3	FCJ Noyon (8)
152.	UES Vermand (10)	0–2	Saint-Amand FC (6)
153.	Olympique Saint-Ollois (12)	3–2	US Rosières (11)
154.	OC Avesnois (10)	0–2	US Crépy-en-Valois (8)
155.	US Hordain (8)	5–1	US Berlaimont (8)
156.	US Anizy Pinon (12)	1–2	Stade Ressontois (9)
157.	US Crèvecœur-le-Grand (10)	2–0	US Escaudain Denain (7)

=== Fourth round ===
These matches were played on 27 and 28 September 2025.

Fourth Round Results: Hauts-de-France (Artois)
Tie no	Home team (Tier)	Score	Away team (Tier)
1.	Saint-Amand FC (6)	2–0	US Vimy (5)
2.	US Chauny (7)	1–2	ES Caudry (8)
3.	US Choisy-au-Bac (7)	6–0 (Note: Tie reversed from original draw.)	ES Ognes (10)
4.	IC Ferrière-la-Grande (11)	0–7	ES Bully-les-Mines (7)
5.	US Guise (9)	2–1	ES Lambresienne (7)
6.	FC Iwuy (9)	1–2	Stade Orchésien (7)
7.	FC Avesnes-sur-Helpe (9)	0–0 (2–3 p)	FCJ Noyon (8)
8.	ESM Hamel (9)	0–0 (3–5 p)	FC Lecelles-Rosult (9)
9.	CO Trith-Saint-Léger (10)	3–0	US Bousies Forest (11)
10.	US Prémontré Saint-Gobain (8)	2–0	Stade Portugais Saint-Quentin (8)
11.	Anzin FARC (10)	5–0	ES Boussois (10)
12.	Olympique Saint-Ollois (12)	2–5	AS Sin-le-Noble (9)
13.	SC Origny-en-Thiérache (9)	0–1	Olympique Saint-Quentin (5)
14.	AS du Pays Neslois (8)	1–2	Internationale Soissonnaise (6)
15.	Rousies Cœur de Sambre (8)	1–1 (4–5 p)	Écureuils Itancourt-Neuville (6)
16.	ES Viry-Noureuil (11)	2–2 (7–6 p)	Stade Ressontois (9)
17.	US Aubygeoise (9)	6–2	AG Solrézienne (10)
18.	SS Marcoing (13)	1–2	SC Aniche (9)
19.	Tergnier FC (8)	0–4	FC Chambly Oise (4)
20.	US Ribemont Mezieres FC (8)	3–3 (2–3 p)	US Buire-Hirson-Thiérache (8)
21.	EA Prouvy (10)	0–3	RC Salouël Saleux (7)
22.	US Noyelles-sous-Lens (7)	3–1	US Maubeuge (6)
23.	Bruay Sports (10)	1–2	US Méru Sandricourt (7)
24.	Thivencelle FC (13)	0–2	US Camon (6)
25.	US Crépy-en-Valois (8)	1–1 (3–4 p)	SC Saint-Just-en-Chaussée (8)
26.	US Nogent (8)	1–0	FC Raismes (7)
27.	US Belleu (10)	2–2 (6–5 p)	Montdidier AC (8)
28.	US Pont Flers (10)	0–3	US Laon (6)
29.	Auxiloise (11)	1–2	AS Auneuil (10)
30.	FC Givenchy-en-Gohelle (13)	0–2	RC Labourse (8)
31.	ASIC Bouttencourt (10)	1–4	US Tourquennoise (6)
32.	Gauchy-Grugies Saint-Quentin FC (10)	3–1	SC Pont-Remy (9)
33.	US Lassigny (9)	0–1	Olympique Marcquois Football (6)
34.	USR Saint-Crépin-Ibouvillers (11)	0–4	Olympique Héninois (8)
35.	AS Beaurevoir (10)	0–2	US Le Pays du Valois (5)
36.	US Chevrières-Grandfresnoy (7)	1–1 (2–3 p)	US Breteuil (7)
37.	ES Chépy (9)	0–4	CS Avion (7)
38.	ES Sains/Saint-Fuscien (10)	1–3	SC Abbeville (7)
39.	JS Écourt-Saint-Quentin (8)	3–1	CS Avilly-Saint-Léonard (9)
40.	US Courcelles (8)	1–4	Bondues FC (6)
41.	Olympique Amiénois (10)	0–3	FC Porto Portugais Amiens (7)
42.	US Nibas Fressenneville (9)	0–1	USO Bruay-la-Buissière (7)
43.	FC Lavilletertre (10)	0–5	FC Montigny-en-Gohelle (6)
44.	AS Gamaches (8)	0–3	AC Cambrai (6)
45.	FC Madeleinois (8)	0–2	Entente Feignies Aulnoye FC (4)
46.	US Nœux-les-Mines (8)	0–1	JS Longuenesse (7)
47.	US Lamorlaye (9)	3–0	US Hordain (8)
48.	US Daours Vecquemont Bussy Aubigny (10)	1–1 (3–5 p)	US Gouvieux (7)
49.	SC Guesnain (8)	2–5	US Biachoise (8)
50.	JS Miannay-Moyenneville-Lambercourt (9)	0–0 (2–4 p)	Arras FA (6)
51.	US Crèvecœur-le-Grand (10)	0–2	EAC Cysoing-Wannehain-Bourghelles (8)
52.	FC Pontpoint Ruraville (9)	1–1 (5–3 p)	Amiens RIF (9)
53.	SC Saint-Nicolas-lez-Arras (8)	1–2	AS Beauvais Oise (4)
54.	Atrébate FC (12)	0–5	US Saint-Pol-sur-Ternoise (8)
55.	US Vermelles (8)	0–1	AFC Creil (7)
56.	US Cheminots Avion (11)	1–3	AS Étaples (8)
57.	US Téteghem (9)	1–0	US Quiestède (10)
58.	AS Berck (8)	0–2	FC Loon-Plage (7)
59.	AAE Aix-Noulette (10)	1–7	OS Aire-sur-la-Lys (7)
60.	ES Cappelloise (9)	1–0	CA Éperlecques (9)
61.	US Boubers-Conchy (12)	2–6	Calais Beau-Marais (7)
62.	ES Mouvaux (8)	2–1	CG Haubourdin (8)
63.	US Ruch Carvin (11)	1–1 (3–1 p)	AS Neuvireuil-Gavrelle (11)
64.	Verlinghem Foot (9)	0–1	AS Marck (7)
65.	USO Lens (9)	0–8	Stade Béthunois (6)
66.	CS Habarcq (10)	1–2	ESD Isbergues (8)
67.	JS Desvroise (9)	2–1	AS Wimereux (8)
68.	FC Saint-Martin-lez-Tatinghem (8)	1–4	AS Steenvorde (6)
69.	US Ascq (8)	0–1	Calonne-Ricouart FC Cite 6 (8)
70.	US Antillais Lille Métropole (11)	4–2	US Billy-Berclau (11)
71.	US Hesdigneul (11)	0–1	US Esquelbecq (7)
72.	AS Dunkerque Sud (8)	1–1 (5–3 p)	ES Arques (8)
73.	RC Roubaix (6)	1–2	US Pays de Cassel (5)
74.	AS Outreau (7)	0–2	Iris Club de Croix (5)
75.	US Gravelines (6)	0–1	Wasquehal FC (4)
76.	US Montreuil (7)	0–4	US Chantilly (4)
77.	AS Hellemmes (9)	0–2	RC Calais (6)
78.	RC Bergues (9)	4–5	FA Neuvilloise (7)
79.	FC Dunkerque-Malo Plage (7)	3–1	Mons AC (8)
80.	Marquette Football Flandres (8)	1–1 (2–4 p)	Olympique Grande-Synthe (6)
81.	OS Fives (9)	0–3	SC Coquelles (7)
82.	USCC Saint-Pol-sur-Mer (8)	2–3	Éclair Neufchâtel-Hardelot (9)
83.	ES Allouagne (13)	0–3	US Saint-Omer (6)

=== Fifth round ===
These matches were played on 11 and 12 October 2025.

Fifth Round Results: Hauts-de-France (Artois)
Tie no	Home team (Tier)	Score	Away team (Tier)
1.	US Breteuil (7)	0–1	FC Montigny-en-Gohelle (6)
2.	US Laon (6)	1–2	US Chantilly (4)
3.	JS Écourt-Saint-Quentin (8)	1–3	Saint-Amand FC (6)
4.	US Gouvieux (7)	0–3	FC Porto Portugais Amiens (7)
5.	US Lamorlaye (9)	1–2	US Le Pays du Valois (5)
6.	US Aubygeoise (9)	5–1	FC Pontpoint Ruraville (9)
7.	ES Viry-Noureuil (11)	1–4	SC Abbeville (7)
8.	ES Caudry (8)	2–4	Arras FA (6)
9.	Gauchy-Grugies Saint-Quentin FC (10)	0–5	Écureuils Itancourt-Neuville (6)
10.	US Saint-Pol-sur-Ternoise (8)	6–0	US Guise (9)
11.	FC Lecelles-Rosult (9)	1–0	AFC Creil (7)
12.	US Choisy-au-Bac (7)	0–0 (5–4 p)	Olympique Saint-Quentin (5)
13.	US Buire-Hirson-Thiérache (8)	1–4	US Camon (6)
14.	SC Saint-Just-en-Chaussée (8)	0–2	AC Cambrai (6)
15.	ES Bully-les-Mines (7)	2–2 (4–3 p)	Internationale Soissonnaise (6)
16.	US Biachoise (8)	0–4	Entente Feignies Aulnoye FC (4)
17.	CS Avion (7)	1–0	US Méru Sandricourt (7)
18.	RC Salouël Saleux (7)	0–0 (6–5 p)	US Noyelles-sous-Lens (7)
19.	US Belleu (10)	1–2	US Nogent (8)
20.	AS Auneuil (10)	0–4	FC Chambly Oise (4)
21.	FCJ Noyon (8)	1–4 (Note: Tie reversed from original draw.)	US Prémontré Saint-Gobain (8)
22.	Anzin FARC (10)	2–1 (Note: Anzin FARC penalised for fielding an ineligible player. ES Mouvaux qualified.)	ES Mouvaux (8)
23.	Iris Club de Croix (5)	1–1 (4–3 p)	Valenciennes FC (3)
24.	US Pays de Cassel (5)	1–1 (2–4 p)	Olympique Grande-Synthe (6)
25.	EAC Cysoing-Wannehain-Bourghelles (8)	0–2	US Téteghem (9)
26.	Éclair Neufchâtel-Hardelot (9)	2–2 (3–1 p)	CO Trith-Saint-Léger (10)
27.	ESD Isbergues (8)	1–2	RC Calais (6)
28.	USO Bruay-la-Buissière (7)	0–1	US Tourquennoise (6)
29.	US Esquelbecq (7)	2–1	FC Dunkerque-Malo Plage (7)
30.	SC Coquelles (7)	2–1	Stade Orchésien (7)
31.	JS Desvroise (9)	0–1	US Saint-Omer (6)
32.	FA Neuvilloise (7)	0–2	Stade Béthunois (6)
33.	Calonne-Ricouart FC Cite 6 (8)	0–1	OS Aire-sur-la-Lys (7)
34.	Olympique Héninois (8)	1–1 (6–5 p)	Calais Beau-Marais (7)
35.	AS Sin-le-Noble (9)	1–5	AS Steenvorde (6)
36.	AS Étaples (8)	1–5	Bondues FC (6)
37.	SC Aniche (9)	4–5	ES Cappelloise (9)
38.	AS Marck (7)	0–2	Olympique Marcquois Football (6)
39.	JS Longuenesse (7)	2–0	AS Dunkerque Sud (8)
40.	RC Labourse (8)	1–5	Wasquehal FC (4)
41.	US Antillais Lille Métropole (11)	1–1 (3–4 p)	FC Loon-Plage (7)
42.	US Ruch Carvin (11)	0–0 (3–4 p)	AS Beauvais Oise (4)

=== Sixth round ===
These matches were played on 24, 25 and 26 October 2025.

Sixth Round Results: Hauts-de-France (Artois)
Tie no	Home team (Tier)	Score	Away team (Tier)
1.	AC Cambrai (6)	1–1 (4–2 p)	SC Coquelles (7)
2.	Arras FA (6)	2–2 (4–5 p)	CS Avion (7)
3.	FC Lecelles-Rosult (9)	1–1 (2–4 p)	AS Beauvais Oise (4)
4.	US Prémontré Saint-Gobain (8)	2–1	US Esquelbecq (7)
5.	ES Cappelloise (9)	1–0	US Téteghem (9)
6.	Olympique Grande-Synthe (6)	1–2	US Chantilly (4)
7.	FC Chambly Oise (4)	4–0	Wasquehal FC (4)
8.	Olympique Héninois (8)	0–3	Stade Béthunois (6)
9.	Écureuils Itancourt-Neuville (6)	2–3	US Camon (6)
10.	Bondues FC (6)	2–1	ES Bully-les-Mines (7)
11.	US Saint-Omer (6)	0–2	Iris Club de Croix (5)
12.	OS Aire-sur-la-Lys (7)	1–0	RC Salouël Saleux (7)
13.	US Le Pays du Valois (5)	1–2	Saint-Amand FC (6)
14.	AS Steenvorde (6)	1–0	RC Calais (6)
15.	ES Mouvaux (8)	1–3	Olympique Marcquois Football (6)
16.	US Tourquennoise (6)	1–4	FC Porto Portugais Amiens (7)
17.	Éclair Neufchâtel-Hardelot (9)	1–5	SC Abbeville (7)
18.	JS Longuenesse (7)	4–1	US Choisy-au-Bac (7)
19.	FC Montigny-en-Gohelle (6)	2–2 (3–5 p)	Entente Feignies Aulnoye FC (4)
20.	US Saint-Pol-sur-Ternoise (8)	0–0 (3–4 p)	US Aubygeoise (9)
21.	US Nogent (8)	1–2	FC Loon-Plage (7)
