= Stade Degouve-Brabant =

Football stadium in Arras, France

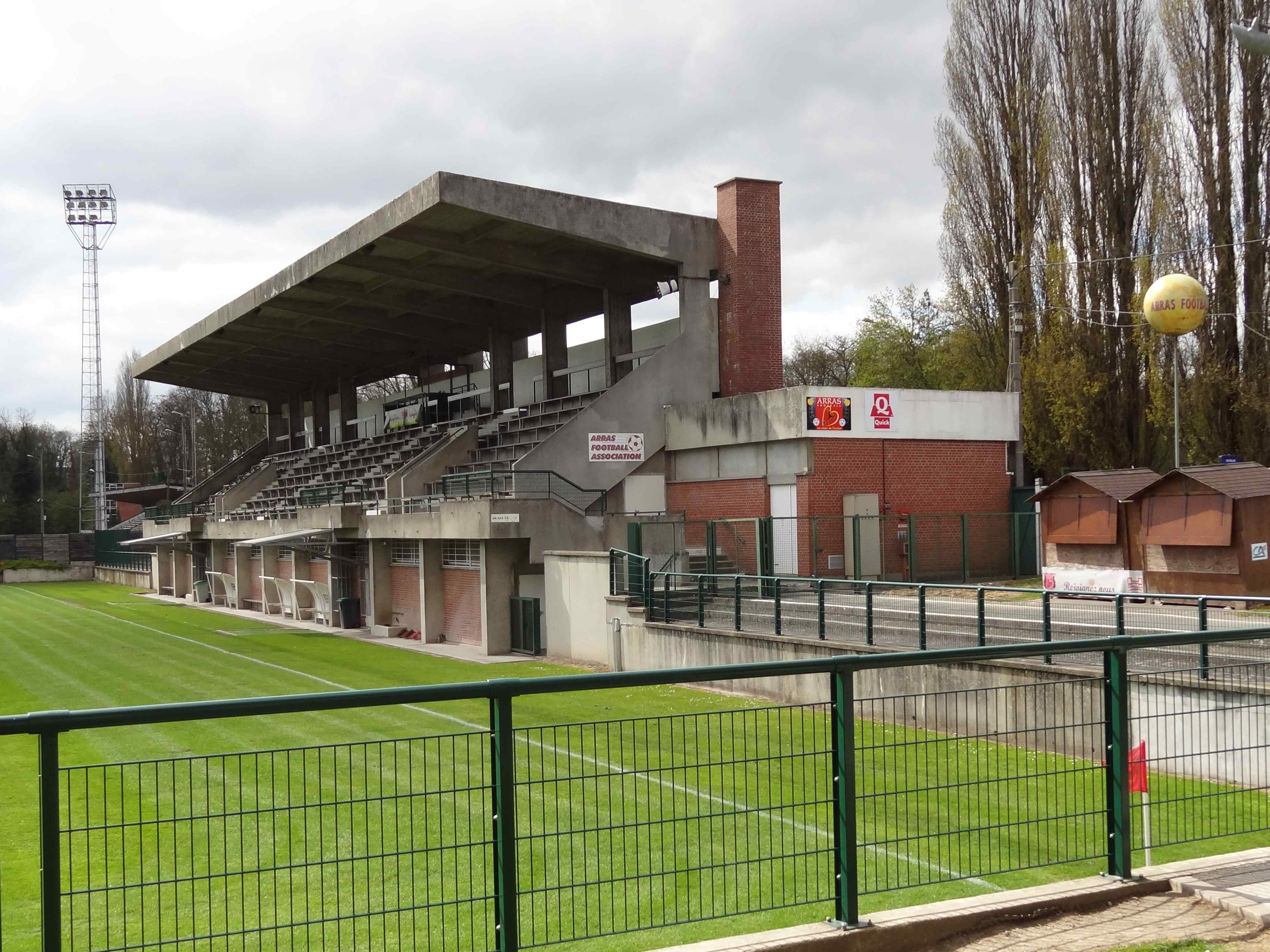

- Location within France
- Address: 5 boulevard du général de Gaulle, 62000 Arras
- Coordinates: 50.284°N 2.766°E
- Owner: Ville d'Arras
- Capacity: 2800
- Surface: natural grass

Tenants
- Arras Football; Arras Football Club Féminin

The Degouve-Brabant Stadium is one of the main stadiums of the city of Arras with the stadiums Pierre Bolle (Arras Football Club Féminin) and Grimaldi (Rugby club Arras).

The field is used by the Arras Football club and the Women's Arras Football Club.

== Organisation ==
The facilities at the stadium are composed of a main grandstand, which backs onto a petrol station. The Grandstand houses the locker rooms of the teams. A courtyard is located on the edge of the lawn to offer shelter, in particular, to those with reduced mobility. The display panel is positioned at the opposite end of the court. Refreshment stalls and a bar are located within the stadium.

The grass of the pitch has been redone during the summer of 2009, following problems in the subsoil.

During a Municipal Council meeting in the town Hall of Arras in the spring of 2014, the council announced the "symbolic" takeover of the Total petrol station attached to the Stadium Degouve-Brabant. The station would be closed permanently by April–May 2015 ; after which all the vats of oil that are stored under the Grandstand would be emptied.

This demolition and then construction is expected to begin in the Summer 2016, or even before that as soon as the championship of the CFA is completed in early June. However, everything will depend on, when the service station closes permanently, if the reserves of gas and oil are to be completely emptied.

The new building of the Arras Football Club Association, will have approx. 15,000 red seats and blue fold-down seats (the club colours), a new refreshment room, a refurbished court, and a refurbished box office/reception area. There will also be an official shop and a club house for V. I. P.s to accommodate the patrons of the club in the best facilities.

The possibility of another covered grandstand, opposite the main grandstand, is not to be excluded, if during the work, the playing area is extended by several metres to the Boulevard du General de Gaulle ; If that happens it will certainly be less imposing (5000 to 7000 seats) but would provide a stadium worthy of receiving teams of League 1 in the Coupe de France for example. These last possibilities should be confirmed, and discussed in the coming months. Some of the long-term members of the club have expressed these ideas to the President Boulnois and his team, in order to reinvigorate this stadium.

== History ==
From the 2012–2013 season, the Degouve stadium is used by the Arras Women's Football Club which is in the First Division for Women.

== Events ==
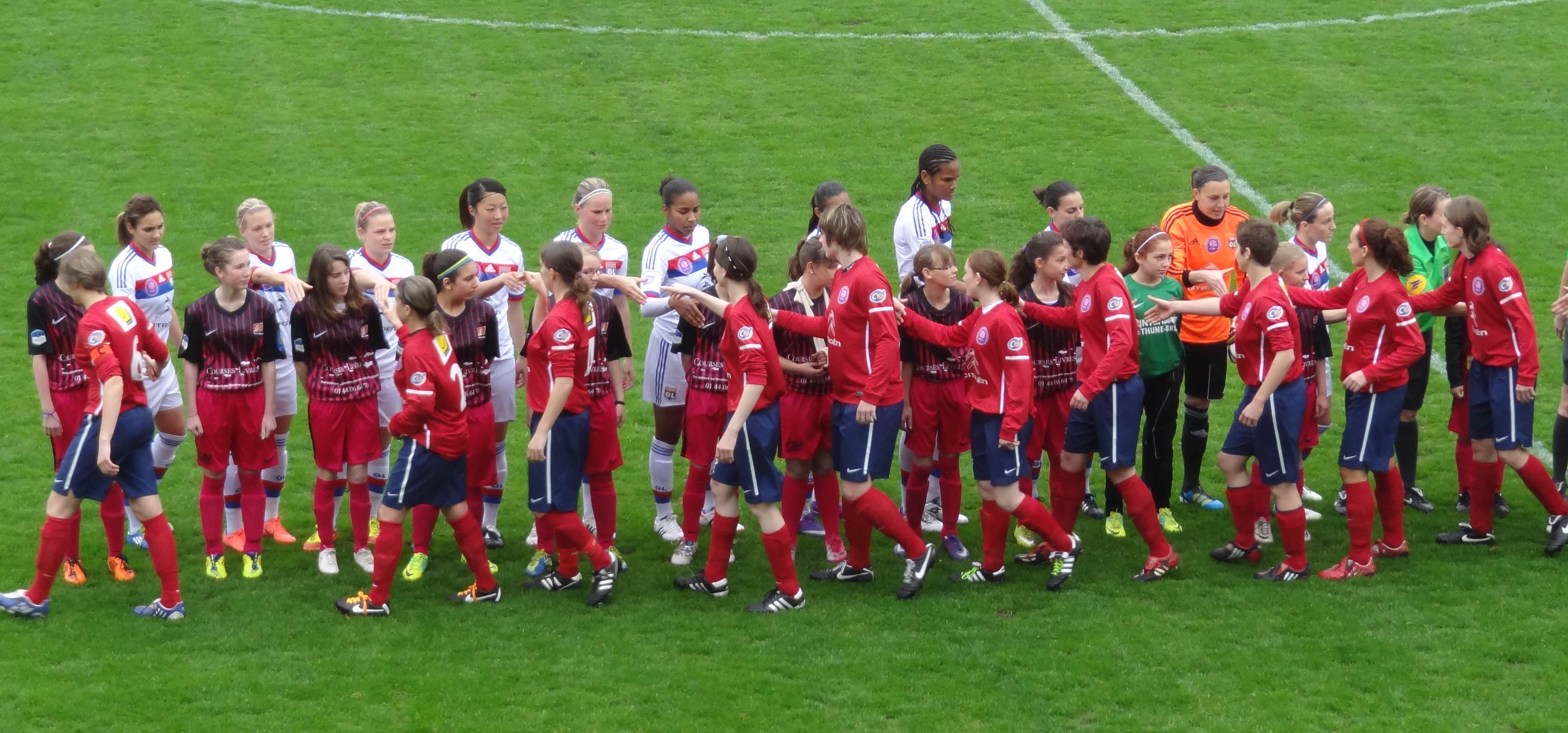
The women of Arras opposed to Lyon

The Degouve stadium hosts occasional gatherings of professional clubs. RC Lens received Amiens in 2005, the Stade Rennais F. C. in 2006, the RAEC Mons in 2008 the CS Sedan Ardennes in 2012 and Charleroi in 2013; for pre-season matches LOSC and US Boulogne also faced each other there in July 2009.

A game was to be held in July 2010 between the Paris Saint-Germain and Mechelen but it was cancelled for security reasons.

On 11 December 2004 Arras faced Nancy during the 8th round of the France Cup. Nancy at the time was leader of League 2 and would in the future be promoted to League 1.

On 11 December 2010 Arras hosted the Stade de Reims, a French football club, in the 8th round of the Coupe de France.

In March 2011, the French Woman's Football Team trained at Degouve before its friendly match at Bollaert against Poland.

On 28 April 2012 the Degouve stadium hosted a semi-final of the Coupe de France football feminine between Arras and the prestigious Olympique lyonnais in front of 2500 spectators.

On 7 December 2012, once again at an 8th round, Arras played SCO Angers (in League 2), and won 1–0.
