= Arras FA =

French football club

- Full name: Club Arras Football Association
- Founded: 1901 as RC Arras
- Ground: Degouve-Brabant Stadium, Arras
- Capacity: 2,800
- Coordinates: 50.284°N 2.766°E
- President: Didier Bouttemy
- Coach: Didier Dubois
- League: Régional 1 Hauts-de-France; Group A
- 2023–24: Régional 1 Hauts-de-France; Group A, 1st of 12
- Website: http://www.arrasfootball.fr/

Arras Football Association is a French association football team founded in 1901. It is based in Arras, France and plays in the Régional 1, the sixth tier in the French football league system. It plays at the Degouve-Brabant Stadium in Arras. From 1901 to 1997, the club was called RC Arras. In 2013, the club made the ninth round of the Coupe de France and lost against Paris Saint-Germain 4–3.
