= 2020–21 Coupe de France preliminary rounds, Hauts-de-France =

French football competition

The 2020–21 Coupe de France preliminary rounds, Hauts-de-France was the qualifying competition to decide which teams from the leagues of the Hauts-de-France region of France took part in the main competition from the seventh round.

A total of eighteen teams qualified from the Hauts-de-France preliminary rounds. In 2019–20, Olympique Grande-Synthe and Stade Portelois progressed furthest in the main competition, reaching the ninth round before losing to AS Nancy (0–1) and Strasbourg (1–4) respectively.

== Schedule ==
The first round, scheduled for the weekend of 30 August 2020, saw 982 teams enter the competition, from the Regional and District divisions. The draw was carried out within each district. 49 clubs were exempted to the second round, mainly from Régional 1 and Régional 2.

The third round draw, which saw the entry of the Championnat National 3 clubs, was made on 11 September 2020. The fifth round draw, which saw the entry of the single Championnat National team from the region, took place on 7 October 2020. The sixth round draw was made on 21 October 2020.

=== First round ===
These matches were played on 30 August 2020, with one replayed on 6 September 2020.

First round results: Hauts-de-France
Tie no	Home team (tier)	Score	Away team (tier)
1.	US Bouillancourt-en-Sery (12)	1–5	ES Harondel (9)
2.	SEP Blangy-Bouttencourt (11)	3–0	FC Mareuil-Caubert (10)
3.	Football Dreuillois (11)	2–5	SC Flixecourt (9)
4.	AS Maisnières (13)	1–9	AS Menchecourt-Thuison-La Bouvaque (11)
5.	USC Portugais Saint-Ouen (12)	0–2	US Béthencourt-sur-Mer (10)
6.	US Le Boisle (14)	0–1	Association Longpré-Long-Condé (12)
7.	AS Woincourt Dargnies (12)	0–9	US Friville-Escarbotin (8)
8.	AS Picquigny (13)	0–2	Avenir de l'Étoile (12)
9.	SC Cayolais (14)	0–12	FC Porto Portugais Amiens (7)
10.	ES Chépy (12)	1–0	AS Hautvillers-Ouville (12)
11.	AS La Chaussée-Tirancourt (14)	1–1 (2–3 p)	FC Rue-Le Crotoy (11)
12.	AS Long (14)	1–5	Avenir Nouvion-en-Ponthieu (11)
13.	JS Bourseville (13)	1–4	AS Huppy (13)
14.	US Quend (11)	8–0	FC Ailly-Vauchelles (13)
15.	Entente Sailly-Flibeaucourt Le Titre (12)	2–6	FC Saint-Valéry Baie de Somme Sud (9)
16.	FR Millencourt-en-Ponthieu (12)	0–1	US Neuilly-l'Hôpital (12)
17.	FC Vignacourt (13)	0–6	JS Cambron (11)
18.	SSEP Martainneville (13)	1–4	AC Hallencourt (11)
19.	AS Quesnoy-le-Montant (14)	9–0	US Vron (13)
20.	FC Grand-Laviers (12)	1–1 (4–5 p)	SC Templiers Oisemont (10)
21.	CO Woignarue (11)	1–1 (5–4 p)	US Nibas Fressenneville (10)
22.	AS Arrest (12)	1–8	Olympique Eaucourtois (12)
23.	AS Airaines-Allery (9)	0–0 (5–4 p)	RC Doullens (9)
24.	CS Crécy-en-Ponthieu (10)	1–0	ES Deux Vallées (9)
25.	AC Mers (11)	0–9	JS Miannay-Moyenneville-Lambercourt (7)
26.	Auxiloise (9)	0–2	FC Ailly-sur-Somme Samara (8)
27.	US Lignières-Châtelain (10)	3–4	FC Centuloise (8)
28.	Poix-Blangy-Croixrault FC (10)	4–1	FC Oisemont (10)
29.	SC Pont-Remy (10)	0–3	US Abbeville (8)
30.	ASIC Bouttencourt (11)	1–1 (3–4 p)	AS Valines (10)
31.	AAE Bray-sur-Somme (13)	1–3	Amiens FC (11)
32.	FC Pont de Metz (13)	2–2 (3–1 p)	US Esmery-Hallon (13)
33.	AS Rethonvillers Biarre Marché (13)	– (Note: Match abandoned after 82 minutes, with the scoreline 2–0, due to violent conduct. Case passed to disciplinary committee. ASM Rivery penalised. AS Rethonvillers Biarre Marché qualify.)	ASM Rivery (12)
34.	ASFR Ribemont Mericourt (11)	1–4	RC Salouël (10)
35.	AS Davenescourt (12)	0–3	Fraternelle Ailly-sur-Noye (10)
36.	AS Domart-sur-la-Luce (13)	1–10	ES Pigeonnier Amiens (8)
37.	US Hangest-en-Santerre (12)	0–3	AS du Pays Neslois (7)
38.	Rumigny FC (14)	0–5	US Rosières (10)
39.	US Allonville (12)	0–4	AS Saint-Sauveur 80 (10)
40.	FC Estrées-Mons (11)	5–1	Olympique Amiénois (10)
41.	ES Cagny (11)	1–7	Montdidier AC (8)
42.	US Méricourt l'Abbé (12)	1–2	US Flesselles (10)
43.	USC Moislains (13)	3–6	Boves SC (12)
44.	ES Licourt (13)	0–6	FR Englebelmer (10)
45.	AF Amiens (12)	2–0	US Daours Vecquemont Bussy Aubigny (10)
46.	US Marchélepot (11)	1–2	FC Blangy-Tronville (11)
47.	AS Cerisy (11)	1–2	FC Méaulte (10)
48.	ES Vers-sur-Selle (13)	4–2	AS Maurepas-Combles (13)
49.	FC Beauval (14)	0–4	AS Prouzel-Plachy (13)
50.	ES Sainte-Emilie/Épehy-le-Ronss (12)	0–4	US Ouvriere Albert (9)
51.	US Cartigny-Buire (12)	0–2	ES Roye-Damery (11)
52.	ABC2F Candas (11)	0–7	Amiens RIF (9)
53.	Olympique Monchy-Lagache (12)	1–0	US Corbie (9)
54.	US Roisel (12)	1–3	CS Amiens Montières Étouvie (9)
55.	US Voyennes (13)	4–1	US Marcelcave (12)
56.	AS Namps-Maisnil (12)	0–1	AS Glisy (10)
57.	Conty Lœuilly SC (9)	0–0 (2–3 p)	RC Amiens (8)
58.	ES Sains/Saint-Fuscien (11)	1–7	FC La Montoye (8)
59.	AS Villers-Bretonneux (9)	1–0	SC Moreuil (8)
60.	AAE Chaulnes (8)	3–1	Entente CAFC Péronne (8)
61.	US Sailly-Saillisel (11)	2–4	AS Querrieu (10)
62.	US Ham (10)	0–3	Olympique Le Hamel (9)
63.	AS Péroy-les-Gombries (13)	0–7	ES Compiègne (11)
64.	AS Saint-Remy-en-l'Eau (12)	2–3	AS Verneuil-en-Halatte (9)
65.	AS Plailly (10)	1–1 (6–5 p)	AS Multien (9)
66.	AS Pontpoint (11)	2–4	AS Silly-le-Long (10)
67.	FCJ Noyon (11)	1–0	US Ribécourt (9)
68.	JSA Compiègne-La Croix-Saint Ouen (10)	5–2 (Note: Tie reversed from original draw.)	FC Golancourt (13)
69.	AS Maignelay-Montigny (12)	0–0 (3–1 p)	AS Saint-Sauveur (Oise) (9)
70.	ASC Val d'Automne (10)	4–7	US Breteuil (7)
71.	CA Venette (10)	0–0 (1–4 p)	US Gouvieux (7)
72.	US Plessis-Brion (9)	0–2	US Pont Sainte-Maxence (7)
73.	AFC Creil (8)	0–0 (4–3 p)	US Margny-lès-Compiègne (8)
74.	Tricot OS (10)	1–0	FC Ruraville (11)
75.	FC Lagny-Plessis (13)	0–2	Rollot AC (12)
76.	FC Neuilly-Cambronne (13)	2–0	AS Thourotte (10)
77.	US Baugy Monchy Humières (10)	5–2	ES Thiers-sur-Thève (12)
78.	FC Saint-Paul (11)	12–2	FC Chiry-Ourscamp (12)
79.	US Nanteuil FC (12)	1–5	Canly FC (10)
80.	AS Tracy-le-Mont (11)	2–1	US Lassigny (9)
81.	FC Carlepont (11)	1–8	SC Lamotte Breuil (10)
82.	JS Guiscard (11)	2–3	ES Ormoy-Duvy (9)
83.	FC Liancourt-Clermont (8)	3–0	FC Longueil-Annel (8)
84.	FC Coudray (13)	0–4	FC Boran (11)
85.	RC Creil Agglo (13)	2–1	RC Précy (11)
86.	AS Mareuil-sur-Ourcq (11)	0–7	FC Béthisy (8)
87.	AS Auger-Saint-Vincent (13)	1–1 (4–5 p)	FC La Neuville Roy (11)
88.	AS Montmacq (12)	3–1	FC Clairoix (10)
89.	FC Sacy-Saint Martin (12)	1–1 (4–3 p)	AS Orry-La-Chapelle (10)
90.	AS Monchy-Saint-Éloi (13)	0–3	US Estrées-Saint-Denis (8)
91.	US Verberie (11)	3–0	ESC Wavignies (11)
92.	AS Coye-la-Forêt (11)	0–5	FC Cauffry (10)
93.	ES Remy (10)	0–1	Stade Ressontois (9)
94.	US Gaudechart (12)	1–2	AS La Drenne-Villeneuve-les-Sablons (13)
95.	US Paillart (11)	2–2 (9–10 p)	US Sainte Geneviève (10)
96.	US Marseille-en-Beauvaisis (10)	1–5	US Nogent (7)
97.	US Étouy-Agnetz (10)	1–2	US Meru Sandricourt (8)
98.	US Saint-Germer-de-Fly (11)	0–1	FC Angy (11)
99.	ES Formerie (11)	2–2 (5–4 p)	AS Laversines (12)
100.	EC Villers/Bailleul (12)	0–5	Standard FC Montataire (8)
101.	USR Saint-Crépin-Ibouvillers (10)	1–1 (4–5 p)	US Villers-Saint-Paul (8)
102.	AS La Neuville-en-Hez (12)	0–1	AS Noailles-Cauvigny (10)
103.	AS Ravenel (12)	5–1	RC Campremy (12)
104.	FC Nointel (12)	1–1 (3–1 p)	US Lieuvillers (10)
105.	CS Haudivillers (11)	2–2 (3–4 p)	AS Ons-en-Bray (10)
106.	AS Bornel (11)	0–3	US Saint-Maximin (7)
107.	OC Bury (12)	1–0	Association Antillais de Creil (12)
108.	AS Hénonville (11)	5–0	Amicale Fleury Trie Château (12)
109.	SCC Sérifontaine (11)	0–3	AS La Neuville-sur-Oudeuil (10)
110.	SC Les Marettes (13)	0–0 (1–4 p)	SC Saint-Just-en-Chaussée (8)
111.	FC Saint-Just des Marais (12)	7–3	FC Jouy-sous-Thelle (13)
112.	FC Esches Fosseuse (12)	3–3 (4–5 p)	AS Verderel-lès-Sauqueuse (11)
113.	CS Avilly-Saint-Léonard (9)	0–2	AS Allonne (9)
114.	US Bresloise (9)	1–1 (6–7 p)	Hermes-Berthecourt AC (10)
115.	EFC Dieudonné Puiseux (10)	8–0	US Froissy (11)
116.	RC Blargies (12)	0–7	SC Songeons (9)
117.	AS Cheminots Chambly (13)	0–3 (Note: Tie won by means of forfeit.)	AS Noyers-Saint-Martin (11)
118.	FC Saint-Omer-en-Chaussée (13)	1–4	AS Auneuil (10)
119.	AS Saint-Samson-la-Poterie (13)	1–6	JS Thieux (11)
120.	US Lamorlaye (9)	3–3 (4–2 p)	FC Fontainettes Saint-Aubin (10)
121.	ASPTT Beauvais (9)	3–2	JS Bulles (11)
122.	US Mouy (12)	0–10	AJ Laboissière-en-Thelle (9)
123.	US Cires-lès-Mello (9)	3–1	US Chevrières-Grandfresnoy (7)
124.	Grandvilliers AC (9)	0–3	USE Saint-Leu d'Esserent (8)
125.	US Crèvecœur-le-Grand (10)	3–1	US Breuil-le-Sec (10)
126.	US Wervicquoise (12)	2–10	US Ascq (7)
127.	Olympique Mérignies (12)	0–9	US Portugais Roubaix Tourcoing (7)
128.	US Wattrelos (8)	0–3	FC Bondues (7)
129.	ES Roncq (8)	0–1	OS Fives (7)
130.	Fort-Mardyck OC (10)	0–5	US Esquelbecq (7)
131.	EC Houplines (9)	1–3	FC Santes (7)
132.	USCC Saint-Pol-sur-Mer (9)	2–1	FC Dunkerque-Malo Plage (7)
133.	IC Lambersart (7)	3–0	ASE Allennoise (11)
134.	AS Salomé (12)	0–4	FC Seclin (7)
135.	AS Rexpoëde (11)	0–10	FC Lambersart (7)
136.	Pont Rommel Football Hazebrouckois (13)	0–10	US Lille Moulins Carrel (8)
137.	AS Winnezeele (12)	0–2	SC Bourbourg (10)
138.	AS Faubourg de Béthune (13)	0–3	FC Mons-en-Barœul (11)
139.	CS Bousbecque (10)	0–3	JS Lille Wazemmes (8)
140.	SR Lomme Délivrance (11)	0–5	ES Weppes (8)
141.	AC Spycker (13)	2–8	FC Lille Sud (9)
142.	ASC Roubaix (11)	3–1	FA Blanc Seau (11)
143.	ES Ennequin-Loos (11)	1–3	Union Halluinoise (9)
144.	AS Pont de Nieppe (12)	2–1	AAJ Uxem (10)
145.	OSM Sequedin (9)	2–1	Football Saint-Michel Quesnoy (10)
146.	FC Wattignies (10)	4–0	ES Wormhout (11)
147.	AS Marcq (14)	0–10	JS Wavrin-Don (9)
148.	FC Bierne (11)	6–2	FC Deûlémont (11)
149.	FC La Chapelle-d'Armentières (9)	2–1	Wattrelos FC (10)
150.	Bac-Sailly Sports (12)	0–4	FC Rosendaël (10)
151.	Olympic Hallennois (12)	2–3	AS Dunkerque Sud (8)
152.	Hondschoote FC (13)	0–7	US Provin (8)
153.	EC Camphin-en-Pévèle (11)	4–1	FC Nieppois (11)
154.	AS Bourgogne Tourcoing (13)	3–0	FC Sailly-lez-Lannoy (11)
155.	AS Pitgam (11)	0–2	FC Linselles (10)
156.	Leers OF (8)	3–2	CG Haubourdin (9)
157.	AS Loos Oliveaux (10)	4–0	ASF Coudekerque (11)
158.	US Estaires (12)	7–2	FC Méteren (11)
159.	ES Genech (10)	3–1	FC Saint-Folquin (11)
160.	ASF Looberghe (12)	3–0	AS Albeck Grande-Synthe (10)
161.	US Ronchin (10)	1–6	AS Hellemmes (8)
162.	FC Forestois (11)	1–3	Stella Lys (9)
163.	CS EIC Tourcoing (13)	0–2	SM Petite-Synthe (9)
164.	Verlinghem Foot (9)	1–1 (3–1 p)	Flers OS (10)
165.	Olympique Hémois (9)	1–3	JA Armentières (9)
166.	Prémesques FC (11)	1–3	ES Mouvalloise (9)
167.	US Leffrinckoucke (9)	0–1	RC Bergues (9)
168.	US Yser (9)	3–1	US Warhem (10)
169.	OC Roubaisien (8)	1–0	ASC Hazebrouck (8)
170.	AC Halluin (12)	0–6	US Marquette (8)
171.	ACS Hoymille (12)	2–5	FC Templemars-Vendeville (10)
172.	USM Merville (11)	2–1	AO Sainghinoise (8)
173.	US Fretin (9)	0–0 (3–5 p)	FC Madeleinois (8)
174.	AS Templeuve-en-Pévèle (9)	1–1 (2–4 p)	AS Baisieux Patro (8)
175.	US Antillais Lille Métropole (11)	3–3 (2–4 p)	AS Dockers Dunkerque (10)
176.	FC Vieux-Berquin (11)	3–2	CO Quaëdypre (10)
177.	USF Coudekerque (10)	1–1 (2–4 p)	FC Le Doulieu (11)
178.	Faches-Thumesnil FC (10)	0–1	ES Lille Louvière Pellevoisin (10)
179.	RC Herzeele (12)	1–4	FC Bauvin (11)
180.	Roubaix SC (9)	3–4	CS La Gorgue (8)
181.	US Fleurbaisienne (14)	2–5	US Pérenchies (9)
182.	JS Ghyveldoise (10)	3–3 (3–5 p)	AS Radinghem (10)
183.	Lille AFS Guinée (13)	– (Note: Match not played due to the ground not being prepared. Lille AFS Guinée penalised. ES Boeschepe qualify.)	ES Boeschepe (11)
184.	US Lederzeele (12)	4–4 (4–5 p)	RC Bois-Blancs Lille (11)
185.	US Mardyck (11)	0–3	FC Annœullin (9)
186.	FC Steene (11)	3–0	EC Anstaing-Chéreng-Tressin-Gruson (9)
187.	FC Wambrechies (10)	0–3	SCO Roubaix (8)
188.	'EAC Cysoing-Wannehain-Bourghelles (9)	3–0	Crous FC Lille (13)
189.	Toufflers AF (11)	0–2	FA Neuvilloise (8)
190.	USF Armbouts-Cappel (10)	3–1	AJL Caëstre (10)
191.	FC Colmar Armentières (13)	0–9	Mons AC (8)
192.	Stade Ennevelin (12)	3–1	US Wallon-Cappel (13)
193.	CS Gondecourt (11)	2–3	Stade Lezennois (9)
194.	US Godewaersvelde (12)	0–5	OSM Lomme (9)
195.	AS Bersée (10)	1–1 (2–3 p)	ES Cappelloise (11)
196.	AF Deux-Synthe (13)	0–5	US Bray-Dunes (10)
197.	AS Jean Baptiste Roubaix (12)	0–2	US Téteghem (9)
198.	JS Steenwerck (10)	3–0	CS Erquinghem-Lys (10)
199.	US Hondeghem (12)	2–3	US Phalempin (10)
200.	US Houplin-Ancoisne (11)	1–2	ACS Comines (10)
201.	AG Thumeries (11)	12–1	OJC Foot Saint-Jans-Cappel (13)
202.	SC Bailleulois (8)	2–1	Villeneuve-d'Ascq Métropole (8)
203.	JS Achiet-le-Petit (14)	0–5 (Note: SCF Achicourt penalised for fielding an ineligible player. JS Achiet-le-Petit qualify.)	SCF Achicourt (14)
204.	AAE Aix-Noulette (11)	0–3	ESD Isbergues (8)
205.	OS Annequin (9)	2–2 (4–3 p)	AS Loison (10)
206.	La Couture FC (10)	1–0	ES Anzin-Saint-Aubin (9)
207.	AS Auchy-les-Mines (13)	1–3	Sud Artois Foot (11)
208.	RC Avesnes-le-Comte (12)	3–5	ES Agny (13)
209.	US Cheminots Avion (11)	4–0	OC Cojeul (12)
210.	AS Bailleul-Sir-Berthoult (13)	3–2	Olympique Arras (12)
211.	AS Bapaume-Bertincourt-Vaulx-Vraucourt (11)	0–1	AS Courrièroise (11)
212.	AS Sailly-Labourse (11)	1–1 (6–5 p)	USA Liévin (9)
213.	AAE Dourges (11)	1–6	AFCL Liebaut (8)
214.	ES Bois-Bernard Acheville (12)	0–2	Avion République FC (13)
215.	AS Bonnières Houvin (15)	2–5	CS Pernes (13)
216.	US Boubers-Conchy (13)	2–0	ES Val Sensée (12)
217.	JS Bourecquoise (15)	3–2	FC Verquigneul (13)
218.	AS Brebières (11)	2–0	AJ Artois (12)
219.	Olympique Burbure (11)	2–2 (5–4 p)	FC Bouvigny-Boyeffles (9)
220.	FC Busnes (14)	3–1	RC Vaudricourt (13)
221.	US Croisilles (10)	2–1	US Billy-Berclau (9)
222.	ES Éleu (13)	5–1	ES Angres (12)
223.	US Grenay (10)	1–1 (6–5 p)	AS Sainte-Barbe-Oignies (7)
224.	USO Drocourt (10)	– (Note: Original match abandoned after 15 minutes with the scoreline 0–0, due to serious injury requiring intervention from the emergency services. A replay was ordered. However, in the replay (which finished 1–3) SC Saint-Nicolas-lez-Arras fielded an ineligible player, and were subsequently penalised. USO Drocourt qualify.)	SC Saint-Nicolas-lez-Arras (8)
225.	ES Ficheux (14)	6–2	AS Berneville (13)
226.	AS Frévent (12)	6–0	US Lapugnoy (13)
227.	FC Givenchy-en-Gohelle (14)	3–1	AOSC Sallaumines (13)
228.	US Gonnehem-Busnettes (10)	0–4	US Annezin (11)
229.	CS Habarcq (12)	3–2	US Pas-en-Artois (11)
230.	ES Haillicourt (14)	1–3	ES Allouagne (12)
231.	AS Kennedy Hénin-Beaumont (15)	3–4	FC Dainvillois (13)
232.	Olympique Héninois (11)	6–0	AS Barlin (12)
233.	US Arleux-en-Gohelle (11)	2–1	Stade Héninois (12)
234.	AS Lyssois (13)	2–1	AEP Verdrel (13)
235.	US Hesdigneul (11)	0–2	FC Montigny-en-Gohelle (9)
236.	FC Hinges (11)	1–1 (2–3 p)	Espérance Calonne Liévin (9)
237.	US Houdain (12)	0–1	FC Camblain-Châtelain (11)
238.	US Izel-lès-Équerchin (14)	3–2	SC Fouquières (12)
239.	FCE La Bassée (15)	1–3	RC Sains (12)
240.	ES Laventie (10)	2–2 (5–4 p)	Auchel FC (9)
241.	AS Lensoise (11)	0–2	RC Labourse (9)
242.	US Lestrem (10)	1–1 (3–2 p)	AS Tincquizel (10)
243.	AFC Libercourtois (14)	1–4	US Monchy-au-Bois (10)
244.	FC Lillers (11)	3–3 (0–3 p)	US Noyelles-sous-Lens (9)
245.	RC Locon 2000 (13)	2–0	ES Douvrin (12)
246.	Diables Rouges Lambres-lez-Aire (12)	0–13	JF Guarbecque (9)
247.	AS Maroeuil (13)	0–3	ES Sainte-Catherine (9)
248.	JF Mazingarbe (12)	0–1	FC Annay (11)
249.	USO Meurchin (10)	2–1	US Courcelles (11)
250.	US Mondicourt (13)	2–2 (3–5 p)	AAE Évin-Malmaison (10)
251.	AS Neuvireuil-Gavrelle (13)	1–2	FC Brebières (14)
252.	Intrépides Norrent-Fontes (12)	0–1	ES Haisnes (10)
253.	AC Noyelles-Godault (11)	2–1	AG Grenay (9)
254.	AS Noyelles-lés-Vermelles (12)	0–4	FC La Roupie-Isbergues (12)
255.	ES Ourton (14)	3–4	US Ham-en-Artois (14)
256.	AS Quiéry-la-Motte (15)	1–7	CSAL Souchez (12)
257.	AS Roclincourt (14)	3–0	Tilloy FC (11)
258.	ES Thiennes (15)	3–4	RC Chocques (14)
259.	ES Saulty (13)	5–0	AS Vallée de la Ternoise (11)
260.	FC Servins (12)	0–6	EC Mazingarbe (10)
261.	US Ablain (12)	0–5	USO Lens (9)
262.	AS Vendin (14)	1–0	FC Richebourg (14)
263.	UC Divion (10)	6–0	ES Vendin (11)
264.	Olympique Vendin (12)	0–2	ES Labeuvrière (9)
265.	AS Cauchy-à-la-Tour (14)	1–0	Entente Verquin-Béthune (13)
266.	AJ Neuville (12)	0–4	SC Pro Patria Wingles (8)
267.	AS Beaurains (10)	2–2 (5–6 p)	UAS Harnes (8)
268.	COS Marles-Lozinghem (9)	3–1	AS Violaines (10)
269.	US Rivière (12)	2–11	Calonne-Ricouart FC Cite 6 (8)
270.	US Heuchin Lisbourg (14)	1–4	AJ Ruitz (13)
271.	US Croisette (14)	0–4	US Maisnil (13)
272.	US Beuvry (11)	2–0	US Rouvroy (9)
273.	FC Estevelles (14)	2–6	FC Hersin (12)
274.	US Ruch Carvin (11)	0–3	USO Bruay-la-Buissière (8)
275.	ES Saint-Laurent-Blangy (9)	2–0	CS Diana Liévin (7)
276.	Olympique Liévin (10)	0–2	US Saint-Pol-sur-Ternoise (8)
277.	JS Écourt-Saint-Quentin (8)	2–2 (4–3 p)	SC Artésien (9)
278.	FC Hauts Lens (12)	2–7	Carabiniers Billy-Montigny (8)
279.	ASPTT Arras (15)	6–2	FC Beaumont (13)
280.	US Rety (14)	0–3	AS Calais (13)
281.	CS Watten (9)	3–2	FC Campagne-lès-Guinness (9)
282.	AC Verte Vallée (15)	1–4	ES Guînes (9)
283.	USM Boulogne-sur-Mer (14)	0–5	ESL Boulogne-sur-Mer (9)
284.	CAP Le Portel (11)	1–2	Éclair Neufchâtel-Hardelot (9)
285.	ASL Vieil-Moutier La Calique (12)	1–1 (4–3 p)	AS Fruges (11)
286.	AS Crémarest (12)	5–4	JS Bonningues-lès-Ardres (13)
287.	ADF Ruminghem (15)	0–17	FCP Blendecques (9)
288.	US Bomy (14)	1–8	US Créquy-Planquette (11)
289.	FC Ecques-Heuringhem (12)	1–4	ES Saint-Omer Rural (10)
290.	AS Bezinghem (10)	0–2	CO Wimille (10)
291.	AS Portelois (14)	1–0	FC Senlecques (14)
292.	FR Preures-Zoteux (13)	0–8	US Attin (9)
293.	FC La Capelle (11)	1–1 (5–3 p)	ES Saint-Léonard (9)
294.	FC Wardrecques (10)	1–2	US Bourthes (9)
295.	US Verchocq-Ergny-Herly (11)	0–6	Verton FC (9)
296.	US Polincove (13)	1–2	FC Wavrans-sur-l'Aa (11)
297.	ES Calaisis Coulogne (8)	3–1	ES Licques (10)
298.	AS Surques-Escœuilles (10)	2–1	AS Saint-Martin-au-Laërt (11)
299.	CA Éperlecques (9)	1–3	Grand Calais Pascal FC (7)
300.	RC Lottinghem (15)	3–3 (2–4 p)	US Coyecques (13)
301.	AS Nortkerque 95 (9)	1–1 (5–4 p)	AS Audruicq (8)
302.	US Marais de Gûines (11)	0–8	JS Longuenesse (8)
303.	RC Brêmes-les-Ardres (13)	2–6	FC Calais Caténa (11)
304.	FC Landrethun-lès-Ardres (14)	0–11	AS Wimereux (10)
305.	AS Andres (14)	1–6	US Hardinghen (12)
306.	AS Colembert (12)	1–1 (4–5 p)	US Alquines (11)
307.	FC Calais Opale Bus (14)	0–4	USO Rinxent (10)
308.	FC Conti (14)	6–1	AC Tubersent (14)
309.	FC Wailly-Beaucamp (13)	2–6	US Dannes (10)
310.	ES Beaurainville (10)	3–1	AS Rang-du-Fliers (11)
311.	FLC Longfossé (10)	8–0	ES Mametz (10)
312.	FC Fréthun (12)	0–3	FC Recques-sur-Hem (9)
313.	AS Tournehem (10)	2–0	RC Bréquerecque Ostrohove (10)
314.	US Quiestède (9)	5–0	Nieurlet SL (14)
315.	Longuenesse Malafoot (12)	1–4	ES Roquetoire (10)
316.	AS Maresquel (13)	– (Note: Match abandoned after 55 minutes, with the scoreline 0–13, after AS Maresquel were reduced to seven players. Gouy-Saint-André RC qualify.)	Gouy-Saint-André RC (11)
317.	AEP Saint-Inglevert (14)	2–1	SO Calais (11)
318.	FC Thiembronne (13)	1–3	Olympique Hesdin-Marconne (8)
319.	AS Campagne-lès-Hesdin (9)	1–6	AS Berck (9)
320.	US Ambleteuse (10)	1–4	US Blériot-Plage (7)
321.	US Coulomby (13)	0–11	ES Arques (8)
322.	FC Nordausques (11)	1–7	RC Ardrésien (9)
323.	FC Wissant (13)	0–13	Calais Beau-Marais (8)
324.	US Conteville Wierre-Effroy (12)	2–7	US Équihen-Plage (9)
325.	FC Wizernes (12)	1–3	US Thérouanne (12)
326.	Lys Aa FC (11)	1–0	Auchy-lès-Hesdin (11)
327.	US Landrethun-le-Nord (10)	0–4	Calais FCHF (9)
328.	US Frencq (11)	3–9	US Montreuil (9)
329.	Entente Calais (10)	2–2 (4–2 p)	FJEP Fort Vert (9)
330.	JS Racquinghem (13)	2–1	AS Esquerdes (12)
331.	US Marquise (10)	1–4	Olympique Saint-Martin Boulogne (8)
332.	US Vaudringhem (14)	2–2 (4–5 p)	ES Helfaut (12)
333.	Amicale Pont-de-Briques (11)	0–5	JS Condette (10)
334.	US Hesdin-l'Abbé (11)	0–6	SC Coquelles (7)
335.	Amicale Balzac (11)	0–1	FC Sangatte (10)
336.	ES Herbelles-Pihem-Inghem (12)	0–5	US Saint-Quentin-Bléssy (9)
337.	FC Isques (12)	0–0 (3–2 p)	US Porteloise (9)
338.	FC Setques (13)	4–2	FC Offekerque (14)
339.	RC Samer (11)	4–4 (4–3 p)	AL Camiers (11)
340.	JS Blangy-sur-Ternoise (13)	0–11	US Nielles-lès-Bléquin (9)
341.	Union Saint-Loupoise (11)	0–5	AS Cucq (8)
342.	Le Portel GPF (13)	3–2	FC Merlimont (10)
343.	AS Saint-Tricat et Nielles (13)	0–2	JS Desvroise (9)
344.	AF Étaples Haute Ville (9)	2–1	AS Conchil-le-Temple (9)
345.	AS Balinghem (13)	0–4	ES Oye-Plage (10)
346.	US Blaringhem (9)	2–2 (3–2 p)	ES Enquin-les-Mines (8)
347.	Maubeuge Olympique (14)	0–2	Wignehies Olympique (12)
348.	SA Le Quesnoy (9)	1–1 (5–3 p)	FC Marpent (7)
349.	JS Avesnelloise (13)	1–1 (4–3 p)	FC Anor (13)
350.	US Villers-Sire-Nicole (14)	1–4	US Glageon (10)
351.	US Prisches (12)	2–2 (5–6 p)	ES Boussois (10)
352.	AG Solrézienne (9)	0–2	US Rousies (10)
353.	AS Étrœungt (13)	3–3 (4–5 p)	AS Trélon (11)
354.	US Sars-Poteries (14)	1–2	US Gommegnies-Carnoy (10)
355.	ASG Louvroil (9)	0–3	SC Maubeuge (10)
356.	US Bousies Forest (14)	1–0	SC Bachant (11)
357.	FC Fontaine-au-Bois (12)	3–2	US Beaufort/Limont-Fontaine (12)
358.	FC Leval (13)	3–2	Red Star Jeumont (13)
359.	CA Sainsois (14)	1–3	AS Douzies (8)
360.	US Landrecies (15)	2–2 (6–5 p)	AS Obies (14)
361.	AS Recquignies (12)	1–2	US Cousolre (9)
362.	OSC Assevent (11)	1–1 (9–10 p)	AFC Ferrière-la-Petite (12)
363.	US Cartignies (14)	0–10	Sports Podéens Réunis (9)
364.	US Jeumont (9)	4–2	IC Ferrière-la-Grande (9)
365.	SCEPS Pont-sur-Sambre (12)	1–3	US Berlaimont (9)
366.	AS Dompierre (13)	0–3	US Bavay (8)
367.	Maubeuge FCCA (11)	1–3	US Fourmies (8)
368.	US Englefontaine (12)	4–2	AS La Longueville (10)
369.	SC Saint-Remy-du-Nord (13)	2–4	AFC Colleret (13)
370.	AS Bellignies (14)	1–5	Olympique Maroilles (10)
371.	AS Preux-au-Bois (14)	0–5	AS Hautmont (8)
372.	OC Avesnois (13)	1–2	US Quievy (11)
373.	US Viesly (11)	0–5	ES Caudry (9)
374.	AS Gouzeaucourt (14)	1–1 (3–4 p)	FC Villers-en-Cauchies (15)
375.	AS Montay (14)	1–2	US Briastre (13)
376.	FC Provillois (10)	5–0	AO Hermies (10)
377.	US Saint-Souplet (10)	1–1 (3–4 p)	FC Saulzoir (10)
378.	FC Maretz (13)	2–4	SC Fontaine-au-Pire (13)
379.	SC Le Cateau (12)	0–4	US Walincourt-Selvigny (9)
380.	SC Osartis-Marquion (13)	2–4	FC Cambrai-Saint Roch (12)
381.	AS Neuvilly (12)	1–3	FC Iwuy (10)
382.	US Haussy (13)	2–2 (4–2 p)	US Fontaine-Notre-Dame (11)
383.	US Busigny (14)	1–2	FC Neuville-Saint-Rémy (11)
384.	Olympique Saint-Ollois (12)	1–3	ES Paillencourt-Estrun (10)
385.	AS Vendegies-Escarmain (11)	1–9	ES Villers-Outréaux (8)
386.	US Les Rues-des-Vignes (14)	1–2	Entente Ligny/Olympique Caullery (10)
387.	OM Cambrai Amérique (9)	0–0 (5–6 p)	US Saint-Aubert (9)
388.	ACRS Portugaise Cambrai (13)	1–1 (1–4 p)	FC Solesmes (11)
389.	US Ors (14)	1–4	US Bertry-Clary (12)
390.	US Rumilly (11)	0–1	AS Masnières (9)
391.	US Beauvois Fontaine (11)	1–1 (5–3 p)	SS Marcoing (11)
392.	FC Pecquencourt (13)	0–2	FC Fressain-Cantin (13)
393.	US Auberchicourt (12)	0–5	US Aubygeoise (12)
394.	SC Guesnain (8)	1–3	Stade Orchésien (9)
395.	FC Féchain (14)	2–0	US Montigny-en-Ostrevent (11)
396.	US Loffre-Erchin (14)	1–1 (2–0 p)	SC Aniche (8)
397.	USAC Somain (10)	4–0	AS Cuincy (11)
398.	US Aubigny-au-Bac (12)	2–2 (8–7 p)	FC Nomain (12)
399.	Dechy Sports (13)	1–3	FC Roost-Warendin (11)
400.	Olympique Flinois (9)	1–1 (5–6 p)	AEF Leforest (8)
401.	Fenain ES (15)	3–5	FC Écaillon (14)
402.	ESM Hamel (10)	4–1	US Frais Marais (10)
403.	US Pont Flers (10)	5–3	US Raimbeaucourt (10)
404.	FC Bruille-lez-Marchiennes (13)	3–3 (3–4 p)	US Corbehem (11)
405.	US Pecquencourt (12)	2–2 (7–6 p)	FC Férin (10)
406.	FC Épinois (9)	5–1	FC Masny (9)
407.	AS Douai-Lambres Cheminots (14)	3–3 (2–4 p)	Olympique Marquette (13)
408.	Olympique Landasien (12)	1–1 (5–4 p)	DC Lallaing (12)
409.	AS Courchelettes (11)	0–4	Olympique Senséen (9)
410.	FC Minier Lewardois (14)	4–5	US Esquerchin (13)
411.	FC Monchecourt (13)	0–4	Olympic Marchiennois (13)
412.	FC Estrées (14)	1–1 (3–4 p)	UF Anhiers (11)
413.	ES Bouvignies (12)	0–4	AS Sin-le-Noble (10)
414.	Maing FC (9)	0–0 (3–2 p)	JO Wallers-Arenberg (9)
415.	Hérin-Aubry CLE (14)	4–1	AS Petite-Forêt (13)
416.	CO Trith-Saint-Léger (10)	6–0	AS Château-l'Abbaye (12)
417.	FC Condé-Macou (14)	2–7	Saint-Saulve Foot (9)
418.	Saint-Waast CFC (12)	0–4	FC Saultain (12)
419.	US Villers-Pol (12)	0–5	US Aulnoy (9)
420.	US Briquette (11)	2–2 (5–4 p)	FC Lecelles-Rosult (10)
421.	AS Artres (12)	– (Note: Match abandoned after 89 minutes, with the scoreline 3–2, due to a pitch invasion. File passed to the disciplinary committee. Both sides were penalised and removed from the competition)	SC Lourches (12)
422.	USM Beuvrages (10)	1–13	US Escaudain (7)
423.	ES Sebourg-Estreux (13)	1–1 (4–5 p)	Olympique Onnaingeois (10)
424.	US Verchain-Maugré (13)	1–2	US Hergnies (12)
425.	AS Wavrechain-sous-Denain (13)	0–1	USM Marly (9)
426.	US Erre-Hornaing (9)	3–1	Vieux Condé Foot (9)
427.	RC Rœulx (13)	0–4	Stade Fresnois (10)
428.	EA Prouvy (10)	0–8	Dutemple FC Valenciennes (8)
429.	Olympique Thun (15)	4–2	JS Haveluy (12)
430.	US Lieu-Saint-Amand (13)	0–4	AS Summer Club Valenciennes (10)
431.	AS Thivencelle (13)	2–3	JS Abscon (10)
432.	FC Famars (10)	3–0	Douchy FC (11)
433.	ES Bouchain (10)	4–1	Bruay Sports (8)
434.	US Quiévrechain (14)	5–5 (3–4 p)	AFC Escautpont (10)
435.	FC Jenlain (13)	0–4	FC Quarouble (9)
436.	Denain OSC (12)	0–4	US Hordain (8)
437.	Neuville OSC (13)	1–4	US Haulchin (12)
438.	SC Vicq (12)	6–0	ES Noyelles-sur-Selle (13)
439.	ES Crespin (10)	2–6	Anzin FARC (10)
440.	Olympique Millonfossois (13)	3–2	Inter Condé (14)
441.	FC Vaux-Andigny (13)	0–3	FC Lehaucourt (11)
442.	FC Travecy (13)	0–7	Stade Portugais Saint-Quentin (7)
443.	ASC Saint-Michel (11)	2–2 (2–4 p)	US Vervins (8)
444.	AS Tupigny (13)	1–2	FC Watigny (10)
445.	FC Saint-Martin Étreillers (11)	0–2	FC Lesdins (10)
446.	ES Sequehart Levergies (12)	0–4	US Vadencourt (10)
447.	RC Bohain (8)	11–0	ES Bucilly-Landouzy-Éparcy (13)
448.	US Étreaupont (12)	0–3	FC Fontainois (12)
449.	Ferté Chevresis FC (11)	0–6	UES Vermand (10)
450.	Espoir Sains-Richaumont (11)	1–0	Le Nouvion AC (9)
451.	CS Montescourt-Lizerolles (12)	2–6	AS Beaurevoir (10)
452.	Dizy-le-Gros FC (13)	0–11	AS Martigny (11)
453.	FC Clastrois (13)	1–0	NES Boué-Étreux (11)
454.	SAS Moy de l'Aisne (8)	1–1 (2–1 p)	Gauchy-Grugies Saint-Quentin FC (9)
455.	AS Nouvionnaise (12)	0–7	Harly Quentin (9)
456.	US Rozoy-sur-Serre (13)	3–2	CS Aubenton (11)
457.	Olympique Gricourt (13)	0–5	ES Montcornet (9)
458.	US Origny-Thenelles (12)	0–2	US Seboncourt (10)
459.	US Brissy-Hamégicourt (11)	1–3	FC Essigny-le-Grand (9)
460.	SC Origny-en-Thiérache (9)	3–1	Marle Sports (10)
461.	ICS Créçois (9)	2–4	US Ribemont Mezieres FC (7)
462.	AFC Holnon-Fayet (9)	0–0 (3–4 p)	US Guise (9)
463.	Étaves-et-Bocquiaux FC (12)	2–0	US Athies-sous-Laon (9)
464.	ESUS Buironfosse-La Capelle (10)	1–1 (5–4 p)	US Buire-Hirson-Thiérache (8)
465.	US La Fère (12)	0–2	FC Hannapes (11)
466.	AS Ohis (12)	0–2	FC Fresnoy Fonsomme (10)
467.	ASPTT Laon (11)	2–2 (2–0 p)	AS Venizel-Billy (9)
468.	Chambry FC (12)	2–3	US Acy (12)
469.	US des Vallées (9)	1–1 (5–4 p)	FC 3 Châteaux (9)
470.	Coveronnais SC (13)	0–5	ES Clacy-Mons (10)
471.	US Vallée de l'Ailette (13)	3–0	L'Arsenal Club Achery-Beautor-Charmes (8)
472.	SC Montaigu (13)	0–8	Septmonts OC (9)
473.	US Prémontré Saint-Gobain (9)	3–0	AS Milonaise (11)
474.	FC Bucy-le-Long (11)	4–2	La Concorde de Bucy-les-Pierrepont (11)
475.	FFC Chéry-lès-Pouilly (10)	0–3	US Aulnois-sous-Laon (10)
476.	US Crépy Vivaise (9)	1–1 (2–4 p)	Union Sud Aisne FC (7)
477.	AS Pernant (12)	1–3	Fraternelle des Cheminots de Laon (13)
478.	US Sissonne (10)	2–4	Château Thierry-Étampes FC (8)
479.	FJEP Coincy (11)	1–4	AS Pavant (12)
480.	ES Ognes (11)	1–3	BCV FC (9)
481.	AS Barenton-Bugny (12)	0–0 (6–7 p)	FC Vierzy (11)
482.	US Bruyères-et-Montbérault (9)	2–1	IEC Château-Thierry (9)
483.	US Guignicourt (10)	0–1	Tergnier FC (8)
484.	AA Mont-Notre-Dame (13)	3–1	US Villers-Cotterêts (12)
485.	ES Viry-Noureuil (11)	2–2 (5–4 p)	ACSF Vic-sur-Aisne (11)
486.	AFC Belleu (12)	2–4	CS Villeneuve Saint-Germain (8)
487.	AS Neuilly-Saint Front (10)	0–4	Internationale Soissonnaise (7)
488.	Entente Crouy-Cuffies (9)	8–2	FC Moncelien (10)
489.	FC Villers-Cotterêts (11)	5–1	ALJN Sinceny (12)
490.	Olympique Saint-Erme (13)	0–3	ASA Presles (10)
491.	FC Gandelu-Dammard (12)	1–7	UA Fère-en-Tardenois (9)

=== Second round ===
These matches were played on 5 and 6 September 2020, with two postponed until 13 September 2020.

Second round results: Hauts-de-France
Tie no	Home team (tier)	Score	Away team (tier)
1.	FCJ Noyon (11)	1–3	Choisy-au-Bac (6)
2.	ES Guînes (9)	2–2 (5–3 p) (Note: ES Guînes penalised after a successful appeal was made by Olympique Saint-Martin Boulogne. Two players on the ES Guînes team changed shirt numbers at half time. Olympique Saint-Martin Boulogne qualify.)	Olympique Saint-Martin Boulogne (8)
3.	US Alquines (11)	0–4	SC Coquelles (7)
4.	JS Desvroise (9)	3–0	AS Nortkerque 95 (9)
5.	RC Ardrésien (9)	0–0 (5–4 p)	US Blériot-Plage (7)
6.	USO Rinxent (10)	4–1	US Dannes (10)
7.	AEP Saint-Inglevert (14)	1–5	US Équihen-Plage (9)
8.	US Hardinghen (12)	1–8	ES Calaisis Coulogne (8)
9.	FLC Longfossé (10)	1–3	Olympique Hesdin-Marconne (8)
10.	Calais FCHF (9)	1–2	AS Wimereux (10)
11.	FC Wavrans-sur-l'Aa (11)	2–2 (5–3 p)	Lys Aa FC (11)
12.	FC Recques-sur-Hem (9)	2–2 (3–1 p)	Entente Calais (10)
13.	AS Portelois (14)	0–10	US Attin (9)
14.	CS Watten (9)	1–8	Olympique Lumbrois (6)
15.	AS Calais (13)	2–3	AS Crémarest (12)
16.	FC Isques (12)	0–2	AS Étaples (7)
17.	AS Surques-Escœuilles (10)	0–3	ES Arques (8)
18.	US Créquy-Planquette (11)	2–1	ES Roquetoire (10)
19.	ASL Vieil-Moutier La Calique (12)	0–10	Éclair Neufchâtel-Hardelot (9)
20.	AS Cucq (8)	0–1	AS Outreau (6)
21.	FC Setques (13)	0–7	US Saint-Quentin-Bléssy (9)
22.	US Coyecques (13)	1–11	JS Racquinghem (13)
23.	FC Conti (14)	1–12	Stade Portelois (6)
24.	CO Wimille (10)	0–10	AS Marck (6)
25.	AS Tournehem (10)	2–1	US Quiestède (9)
26.	JS Renescuroise (11)	0–0 (6–5 p)	US Blaringhem (9)
27.	RC Samer (11)	0–7	US Montreuil (9)
28.	ESL Boulogne-sur-Mer (9)	1–2	Calais Beau-Marais (8)
29.	Le Portel GPF (13)	1–3	FC La Capelle (11)
30.	Verton FC (9)	0–0 (4–3 p)	AF Étaples Haute Ville (9)
31.	US Thérouanne (12)	0–2	ES Saint-Omer Rural (10)
32.	Gouy-Saint-André RC (11)	0–2	AS Berck (9)
33.	JS Condette (10)	2–1	FC Sangatte (10)
34.	FC Calais Caténa (11)	0–7	JS Longuenesse (8)
35.	US Bourthes (9)	3–0	FCP Blendecques (9)
36.	ES Helfaut (12)	0–3	US Nielles-lès-Bléquin (9)
37.	AS Fillièvres (13)	0–13	ES Beaurainville (10)
38.	ES Oye-Plage (10)	0–6	Grand Calais Pascal FC (7)
39.	US Landrecies (15)	0–15	US Fourmies (8)
40.	US Glageon (10)	3–0	AS Douzies (8)
41.	AFC Colleret (13)	4–0	US Bousies Forest (14)
42.	Wignehies Olympique (12)	1–0	SC Maubeuge (10)
43.	AS Trélon (11)	0–1	SA Le Quesnoy (9)
44.	AFC Ferrière-la-Petite (12)	0–2	ES Boussois (10)
45.	FC Fontaine-au-Bois (12)	0–2	Sports Podéens Réunis (9)
46.	Olympique Maroilles (10)	1–1 (5–6 p)	FC Avesnes-sur-Helpe (7)
47.	US Rousies (10)	0–1	US Bavay (8)
48.	US Cousolre (9)	0–2	AS Hautmont (8)
49.	US Englefontaine (12)	0–6	US Berlaimont (9)
50.	JS Avesnelloise (13)	0–10	US Jeumont (9)
51.	FC Leval (13)	1–5	US Gommegnies-Carnoy (10)
52.	ES Paillencourt-Estrun (10)	4–1	US Beauvois Fontaine (11)
53.	FC Villers-en-Cauchies (15)	0–1	FC Neuville-Saint-Rémy (11)
54.	FC Cambrai-Saint Roch (12)	1–3	US Walincourt-Selvigny (9)
55.	FC Saulzoir (10)	0–5	CAS Escaudœuvres (6)
56.	US Quievy (11)	1–1 (7–8 p)	Entente Ligny/Olympique Caullery (10)
57.	US Briastre (13)	0–3	US Saint-Aubert (9)
58.	FC Iwuy (10)	1–3	AC Cambrai (6)
59.	AS Masnières (9)	1–2	FC Provillois (10)
60.	US Bertry-Clary (12)	0–5	ES Villers-Outréaux (8)
61.	FC Solesmes (11)	2–7	ES Caudry (9)
62.	SC Fontaine-au-Pire (13)	4–0	US Haussy (13)
63.	Olympique Senséen (9)	1–1 (2–3 p)	ESM Hamel (10)
64.	FC Fressain-Cantin (13)	0–1	FC Écaillon (14)
65.	Olympic Marchiennois (13)	1–4	US Aubigny-au-Bac (12)
66.	USAC Somain (10)	0–5	SC Douai (7)
67.	FC Féchain (14)	0–11	ES Lambresienne (6)
68.	US Corbehem (11)	0–6	US Aubygeoise (12)
69.	FC Roost-Warendin (11)	0–3	US Pecquencourt (12)
70.	UF Anhiers (11)	0–4	AS Beuvry-la-Forêt (7)
71.	Olympique Landasien (12)	0–8	Stade Orchésien (9)
72.	AS Sin-le-Noble (10)	2–4	US Pont Flers (10)
73.	Olympique Marquette (13)	4–0	US Esquerchin (13)
74.	FC Épinois (9)	– (Note: Match abandoned during the penalty shootout, the final score being 1–1. FC Épinois penalised. US Mineurs Waziers qualify.)	US Mineurs Waziers (7)
75.	US Loffre-Erchin (14)	2–2 (4–2 p)	AEF Leforest (8)
76.	USM Marly (9)	4–1	FC Famars (10)
77.	Hérin-Aubry CLE (14)	1–4	US Hergnies (12)
78.	AFC Escautpont (10)	3–1	US Briquette (11)
79.	US Haulchin (12)	0–9	FC Raismes (7)
80.	FC Saultain (12)	0–7	Saint-Amand FC (6)
81.	Stade Fresnois (10)	2–1	CO Trith-Saint-Léger (10)
82.	Dutemple FC Valenciennes (8)	1–1 (3–4 p)	US Escaudain (7)
83.	FC Quarouble (9)	0–1	IC La Sentinelle (7)
84.	JS Abscon (10)	1–6	Saint-Saulve Foot (9)
85.	US Hordain (8)	1–0	US Erre-Hornaing (9)
86.	AS Summer Club Valenciennes (10)	5–2	ES Bouchain (10)
87.	SC Vicq (12)	2–4	Maing FC (9)
88.	Olympique Thun (15)	9–2	Anzin FARC (10)
89.	US Aulnoy (9)	4–1	Olympique Onnaingeois (10)
90.	AS Verneuil-en-Halatte (9)	0–9	ES Valois Multien (6)
91.	US Gouvieux (7)	3–1	US Estrées-Saint-Denis (8)
92.	Standard FC Montataire (8)	0–1	US Saint-Maximin (7)
93.	AS Silly-le-Long (10)	1–1 (7–6 p)	EFC Dieudonné Puiseux (10)
94.	AS Noailles-Cauvigny (10)	0–1	Tricot OS (10)
95.	Rollot AC (12)	0–4	SC Lamotte Breuil (10)
96.	Canly FC (10)	2–1	US Cires-lès-Mello (9)
97.	AS Plailly (10)	0–3	US Balagny-Saint-Epin (7)
98.	SC Songeons (9)	0–1	AJ Laboissière-en-Thelle (9)
99.	Hermes-Berthecourt AC (10)	0–4	AS Allonne (9)
100.	USE Saint-Leu d'Esserent (8)	5–0 (Note: Tie reversed from original draw.)	AS Hénonville (11)
101.	AS Ravenel (12)	0–9	US Breteuil (7)
102.	AS Ons-en-Bray (10)	0–4	USM Senlisienne (6)
103.	FC Sacy-Saint Martin (12)	2–3	FC Béthisy (8)
104.	RC Creil Agglo (13)	2–1	FC Nointel (12)
105.	ES Compiègne (11)	3–2	AS Maignelay-Montigny (12)
106.	ES Ormoy-Duvy (9)	3–1	US Pont Sainte-Maxence (7)
107.	FC Saint-Paul (11)	1–3	US Lamorlaye (9)
108.	Stade Ressontois (9)	2–1	JSA Compiègne-La Croix-Saint Ouen (10)
109.	FC Saint-Just des Marais (12)	0–3	FC Cauffry (10)
110.	AS Auneuil (10)	2–2 (5–4 p)	US Baugy Monchy Humières (10)
111.	FC Angy (11)	0–4	AFC Compiègne (6)
112.	AS Montmacq (12)	0–3	US Nogent (7)
113.	OC Bury (12)	1–6	US Crèvecœur-le-Grand (10)
114.	FC Neuilly-Cambronne (13)	0–10	AFC Creil (8)
115.	AS La Drenne-Villeneuve-les-Sablons (13)	2–2 (1–3 p)	JS Thieux (11)
116.	AS Tracy-le-Mont (11)	0–1	SC Saint-Just-en-Chaussée (8)
117.	AS Noyers-Saint-Martin (11)	3–1	US Meru Sandricourt (8)
118.	US Sainte Geneviève (10)	1–6	CS Chaumont-en-Vexin (6)
119.	AS Verderel-lès-Sauqueuse (11)	0–8	US Roye-Noyon (6)
120.	FC Boran (11)	0–0 (2–4 p)	ES Formerie (11)
121.	AS La Neuville-sur-Oudeuil (10)	2–0	US Villers-Saint-Paul (8)
122.	FC La Neuville Roy (11)	0–5	FC Liancourt-Clermont (8)
123.	US Verberie (11)	1–1 (5–3 p)	ASPTT Beauvais (9)
124.	AS Martigny (11)	0–6	CS Villeneuve Saint-Germain (8)
125.	SC Origny-en-Thiérache (9)	1–2	US Ribemont Mezieres FC (7)
126.	Étaves-et-Bocquiaux FC (12)	0–3	Tergnier FC (8)
127.	FC Bucy-le-Long (11)	1–2	Septmonts OC (9)
128.	ESUS Buironfosse-La Capelle (10)	2–0	US Prémontré Saint-Gobain (9)
129.	UES Vermand (10)	0–1	US Laon (6)
130.	UA Fère-en-Tardenois (9)	2–2 (4–2 p)	US Guise (9)
131.	FC Fontainois (12)	0–4	Internationale Soissonnaise (7)
132.	US Acy (12)	2–6	FC Fresnoy Fonsomme (10)
133.	FC Vierzy (11)	0–5	Château Thierry-Étampes FC (8)
134.	AS Pavant (12)	3–1	US des Vallées (9)
135.	Union Sud Aisne FC (7)	1–4	US Chauny (6)
136.	FC Villers-Cotterêts (11)	1–3	BCV FC (9)
137.	FC Lehaucourt (11)	0–0 (3–4 p)	SAS Moy de l'Aisne (8)
138.	FC Lesdins (10)	1–1 (8–7 p)	Espoir Sains-Richaumont (11)
139.	US Vallée de l'Ailette (13)	2–0	ASA Presles (10)
140.	US Aulnois-sous-Laon (10)	0–2	US Vervins (8)
141.	AA Mont-Notre-Dame (13)	0–6	ES Clacy-Mons (10)
142.	ES Montcornet (9)	2–1	Stade Portugais Saint-Quentin (7)
143.	US Rozoy-sur-Serre (13)	1–7	FC Essigny-le-Grand (9)
144.	Fraternelle des Cheminots de Laon (13)	0–4	RC Bohain (8)
145.	US Vadencourt (10)	2–0	ES Viry-Noureuil (11)
146.	FC Hannapes (11)	0–1	US Seboncourt (10)
147.	FC Clastrois (13)	0–0 (3–4 p)	AS Beaurevoir (10)
148.	ASPTT Laon (11)	1–1 (3–4 p)	US Bruyères-et-Montbérault (9)
149.	Entente Crouy-Cuffies (9)	1–4	Écureuils Itancourt-Neuville (6)
150.	Harly Quentin (9)	4–1	FC Watigny (10)
151.	JS Achiet-le-Petit (14)	0–16	ES Éleu (13)
152.	JS Bourecquoise (15)	3–1	AS Bailleul-Sir-Berthoult (13)
153.	FC Brebières (14)	2–2 (6–5 p)	ASPTT Arras (15)
154.	US Ham-en-Artois (14)	0–2	RC Locon 2000 (13)
155.	RC Chocques (14)	2–2 (4–5 p)	US Boubers-Conchy (13)
156.	ES Agny (13)	1–3	AS Frévent (12)
157.	CS Pernes (13)	2–1	ES Ficheux (14)
158.	AJ Ruitz (13)	2–2 (5–3 p)	AS Roclincourt (14)
159.	US Maisnil (13)	1–3	ES Saulty (13)
160.	FC Busnes (14)	0–6	Avion République FC (13)
161.	US Izel-lès-Équerchin (14)	7–2	AS Lyssois (13)
162.	AS Cauchy-à-la-Tour (14)	1–1 (2–4 p)	RC Sains (12)
163.	ES Allouagne (12)	0–2	US Beuvry (11)
164.	FC La Roupie-Isbergues (12)	1–1 (5–3 p)	US Arleux-en-Gohelle (11)
165.	CSAL Souchez (12)	0–2	UC Divion (10)
166.	ESD Isbergues (8)	1–1 (4–2 p)	ES Bully-les-Mines (7)
167.	Calonne-Ricouart FC Cite 6 (8)	1–4	Arras FA (6)
168.	FC Montigny-en-Gohelle (9)	2–10	OS Aire-sur-la-Lys (7)
169.	EC Mazingarbe (10)	4–2	AFCL Liebaut (8)
170.	JS Écourt-Saint-Quentin (8)	0–3	OS Annequin (9)
171.	US Cheminots Avion (11)	1–2	COS Marles-Lozinghem (9)
172.	La Couture FC (10)	1–8	US Vermelles (7)
173.	AS Vendin (14)	1–2	CS Habarcq (12)
174.	US Annezin (11)	1–5	SC Pro Patria Wingles (8)
175.	ES Haisnes (10)	2–4	US Biachoise (7)
176.	US Saint-Pol-sur-Ternoise (8)	3–1	CS Avion (6)
177.	AAE Évin-Malmaison (10)	1–6	US Nœux-les-Mines (6)
178.	Espérance Calonne Liévin (9)	0–2	US Saint-Maurice Loos-en-Gohelle (6)
179.	FC Camblain-Châtelain (11)	1–0	FC Hersin (12)
180.	Sud Artois Foot (11)	1–3	AS Sailly-Labourse (11)
181.	AS Courrièroise (11)	3–3 (2–3 p)	Carabiniers Billy-Montigny (8)
182.	FC Annay (11)	1–0	Olympique Burbure (11)
183.	ES Labeuvrière (9)	1–2	USO Meurchin (10)
184.	USO Bruay-la-Buissière (8)	4–0	ES Saint-Laurent-Blangy (9)
185.	UAS Harnes (8)	3–2	JF Guarbecque (9)
186.	US Noyelles-sous-Lens (9)	2–0	Stade Béthunois (6)
187.	USO Lens (9)	2–1	US Croisilles (10)
188.	RC Labourse (9)	1–0	US Grenay (10)
189.	ES Sainte-Catherine (9)	3–0	ES Laventie (10)
190.	US Lestrem (10)	2–1	AC Noyelles-Godault (11)
191.	Olympique Héninois (11)	1–3	US Monchy-au-Bois (10)
192.	ES Vers-sur-Selle (13)	1–3	FC Méaulte (10)
193.	FC Pont de Metz (13)	1–4	Montdidier AC (8)
194.	FC Blangy-Tronville (11)	1–5	AS du Pays Neslois (7)
195.	ES Roye-Damery (11)	0–6	Fraternelle Ailly-sur-Noye (10)
196.	FR Englebelmer (10)	6–2	FC Estrées-Mons (11)
197.	Amiens FC (11)	0–3	ES Pigeonnier Amiens (8)
198.	Olympique Le Hamel (9)	1–0	AS Saint-Sauveur 80 (10)
199.	AS Prouzel-Plachy (13)	1–0	AS Querrieu (10)
200.	US Ouvriere Albert (9)	1–2	RC Amiens (8)
201.	Amiens RIF (9)	3–1	AS Glisy (10)
202.	Olympique Monchy-Lagache (12)	1–7	FC La Montoye (8)
203.	Boves SC (12)	0–4	US Rosières (10)
204.	AS Villers-Bretonneux (9)	2–2 (1–3 p)	ESC Longueau (6)
205.	RC Salouël (10)	1–2	AAE Chaulnes (8)
206.	US Voyennes (13)	0–11	US Camon (6)
207.	CS Amiens Montières Étouvie (9)	1–1 (1–3 p)	US Abbeville (8)
208.	US Béthencourt-sur-Mer (10)	0–3	SC Flixecourt (9)
209.	JS Cambron (11)	1–1 (1–3 p)	CS Crécy-en-Ponthieu (10)
210.	FC Ailly-sur-Somme Samara (8)	0–2	AS Gamaches (7)
211.	US Neuilly-l'Hôpital (12)	2–3	FC Centuloise (8)
212.	SC Templiers Oisemont (10)	0–4	FC Porto Portugais Amiens (7)
213.	CO Woignarue (11)	0–4	US Friville-Escarbotin (8)
214.	US Flesselles (10)	1–1 (1–3 p)	Avenir Nouvion-en-Ponthieu (11)
215.	AS Menchecourt-Thuison-La Bouvaque (11)	1–4	Poix-Blangy-Croixrault FC (10)
216.	Olympique Eaucourtois (12)	1–2	AS Valines (10)
217.	AC Hallencourt (11)	0–0 (5–4 p)	ES Chépy (12)
218.	FC Saint-Valéry Baie de Somme Sud (9)	3–0	US Quend (11)
219.	AS Quesnoy-le-Montant (14)	8–0	Association Longpré-Long-Condé (12)
220.	SEP Blangy-Bouttencourt (11)	0–6	SC Abbeville (6)
221.	AS Huppy (13)	2–10	ES Harondel (9)
222.	AS Airaines-Allery (9)	0–4	JS Miannay-Moyenneville-Lambercourt (7)
223.	Avenir de l'Étoile (12)	1–1 (5–4 p)	FC Rue-Le Crotoy (11)
224.	FC Lille Sud (9)	2–3	AS Steenvorde (6)
225.	FC Vieux-Berquin (11)	0–4	FC Seclin (7)
226.	RC Bergues (9)	1–1 (4–5 p)	US Lesquin (6)
227.	US Estaires (12)	0–4	US Provin (8)
228.	RC Bois-Blancs Lille (11)	1–1 (4–3 p)	Union Halluinoise (9)
229.	USM Merville (11)	4–0	ES Boeschepe (11)
230.	FC Rosendaël (10)	0–6	US Lille Moulins Carrel (8)
231.	US Ascq (7)	4–0	SCO Roubaix (8)
232.	Stella Lys (9)	0–0 (6–5 p)	EAC Cysoing-Wannehain-Bourghelles (9)
233.	FC Le Doulieu (11)	0–3	US Gravelines (6)
234.	FC Mons-en-Barœul (11)	0–5	Leers OF (8)
235.	ES Weppes (8)	1–0	Stade Lezennois (9)
236.	USF Armbouts-Cappel (10)	1–5	IC Lambersart (7)
237.	US Bray-Dunes (10)	0–5	Olympique Grande-Synthe (6)
238.	AS Radinghem (10)	1–3	US Saint-André (6)
239.	FC Wattignies (10)	0–4	FC Madeleinois (8)
240.	OC Roubaisien (8)	5–1	FC Annœullin (9)
241.	AS Pont de Nieppe (12)	0–9	AS Loos Oliveaux (10)
242.	Stade Ennevelin (12)	2–3	AG Thumeries (11)
243.	AS Bourgogne Tourcoing (13)	2–3	US Téteghem (9)
244.	ASC Roubaix (11)	1–1 (6–5 p)	JS Steenwerck (10)
245.	FC Steene (11)	0–4	USCC Saint-Pol-sur-Mer (9)
246.	FC Lambersart (7)	3–2	US Pays de Cassel (6)
247.	CS La Gorgue (8)	1–1 (3–5 p)	SC Bailleulois (8)
248.	FC Bauvin (11)	1–1 (3–2 p)	AS Dunkerque Sud (8)
249.	US Portugais Roubaix Tourcoing (7)	2–2 (4–5 p)	AS Baisieux Patro (8)
250.	Verlinghem Foot (9)	1–2	FC Bondues (7)
251.	FC Linselles (10)	1–2	AS Hellemmes (8)
252.	ES Mouvalloise (9)	0–1	US Yser (9)
253.	ES Lille Louvière Pellevoisin (10)	0–4	US Marquette (8)
254.	JA Armentières (9)	10–1	AS Dockers Dunkerque (10)
255.	SC Bourbourg (10)	3–2	ES Cappelloise (11)
256.	US Tourcoing FC (6)	17–1	US Phalempin (10)
257.	FC Bierne (11)	1–2	OSM Sequedin (9)
258.	JS Wavrin-Don (9)	5–0	ES Genech (10)
259.	ASF Looberghe (12)	1–3	OS Fives (7)
260.	EC Camphin-en-Pévèle (11)	3–6	JS Lille Wazemmes (8)
261.	SM Petite-Synthe (9)	0–2	US Esquelbecq (7)
262.	FA Neuvilloise (8)	1–6	FC Loon-Plage (6)
263.	US Pérenchies (9)	1–3	Mons AC (8)
264.	ACS Comines (10)	2–2 (6–7 p)	FC La Chapelle-d'Armentières (9)
265.	FC Templemars-Vendeville (10)	2–2 (2–4 p)	OSM Lomme (9)
266.	FC Dainvillois (13)	0–2	FC Givenchy-en-Gohelle (14)
267.	FC Santes (7)	0–0 (2–4 p)	SC Hazebrouck (6)
268.	winner tie 421	– (Note: Match void due to both teams from match 421 being removed from the competition. Olympique Millonfossois qualify.)	Olympique Millonfossois (13)
269.	AS Brebières (11)	2–1	USO Drocourt (10)
270.	AS Rethonvillers Biarre Marché (13)	1–1 (4–1 p)	AF Amiens (12)

=== Third round ===
These matches were played on 19 and 20 September 2020.

Third round results: Hauts-de-France
Tie no	Home team (tier)	Score	Away team (tier)
1.	FC La Chapelle-d'Armentières (9)	1–4	US Yser (9)
2.	USM Merville (11)	0–0 (3–5 p)	US Téteghem (9)
3.	US Montreuil (9)	3–1	AS Hellemmes (8)
4.	US Attin (9)	0–1	Stade Portelois (6)
5.	Leers OF (8)	3–2	Olympique Hesdin-Marconne (8)
6.	AS Berck (9)	2–1	JS Condette (10)
7.	Mons AC (8)	1–1 (7–8 p)	SC Hazebrouck (6)
8.	ES Arques (8)	2–3	AS Steenvorde (6)
9.	US Créquy-Planquette (11)	0–9	FC Loon-Plage (6)
10.	AS Wimereux (10)	2–2 (5–6 p)	Olympique Grande-Synthe (6)
11.	Verton FC (9)	2–3	AS Étaples (7)
12.	JS Longuenesse (8)	4–0	JS Desvroise (9)
13.	US Esquelbecq (7)	1–3	AS Outreau (6)
14.	US Équihen-Plage (9)	1–5	USCC Saint-Pol-sur-Mer (9)
15.	ES Beaurainville (10)	0–2	US Bourthes (9)
16.	Éclair Neufchâtel-Hardelot (9)	0–2	JA Armentières (9)
17.	FC La Capelle (11)	1–3	OSM Sequedin (9)
18.	SC Bourbourg (10)	0–4	US Gravelines (6)
19.	SC Bailleulois (8)	2–1	Le Touquet AC (5)
20.	USO Rinxent (10)	1–1 (4–2 p)	RC Bois-Blancs Lille (11)
21.	FC Écaillon (14)	1–3	US Aulnoy (9)
22.	US Lesquin (6)	0–0 (4–3 p)	FC Lambersart (7)
23.	US Aubygeoise (12)	1–3	UC Divion (10)
24.	AFC Escautpont (10)	2–3	US Hordain (8)
25.	US Hergnies (12)	2–1	FC Bauvin (11)
26.	RC Sains (12)	0–1	AS Baisieux Patro (8)
27.	ESD Isbergues (8)	0–4	US Tourcoing FC (6)
28.	JS Bourecquoise (15)	0–14	IC Lambersart (7)
29.	Olympique Marquette (13)	0–8	Olympique Marcquois Football (5)
30.	COS Marles-Lozinghem (9)	1–2	FC Madeleinois (8)
31.	FC La Roupie-Isbergues (12)	0–11	US Vimy (5)
32.	RC Locon 2000 (13)	1–8	FC Bondues (7)
33.	OS Fives (7)	4–0	ES Weppes (8)
34.	Maing FC (9)	1–2	Stella Lys (9)
35.	AS Sailly-Labourse (11)	1–0	ASC Roubaix (11)
36.	AJ Ruitz (13)	2–2 (1–3 p)	US Lestrem (10)
37.	US Aubigny-au-Bac (12)	0–2	OS Annequin (9)
38.	Anzin FARC (10)	1–0	Stade Fresnois (10)
39.	Olympique Millonfossois (13)	0–2	OS Aire-sur-la-Lys (7)
40.	US Pecquencourt (12)	1–7	USO Bruay-la-Buissière (8)
41.	FC Recques-sur-Hem (9)	3–0	USO Lens (9)
42.	FC Wavrans-sur-l'Aa (11)	1–3	US Nielles-lès-Bléquin (9)
43.	JS Renescuroise (11)	0–4	US Provin (8)
44.	AS Summer Club Valenciennes (10)	1–1 (1–4 p)	US Escaudain (7)
45.	JS Lille Wazemmes (8)	5–1	JS Wavrin-Don (9)
46.	Carabiniers Billy-Montigny (8)	0–3	Calais Beau-Marais (8)
47.	ESM Hamel (10)	1–1 (6–7 p)	FC Seclin (7)
48.	US Pont Flers (10)	1–3	Grand Calais Pascal FC (7)
49.	SA Le Quesnoy (9)	2–4	US Ascq (7)
50.	AS Tournehem (10)	3–3 (5–6 p)	OC Roubaisien (8)
51.	IC La Sentinelle (7)	1–2	Wasquehal Football (5)
52.	US Loffre-Erchin (14)	0–0 (4–5 p)	AS Loos Oliveaux (10)
53.	Saint-Saulve Foot (9)	2–0	Olympique Saint-Martin Boulogne (8)
54.	AG Thumeries (11)	2–3	UAS Harnes (8)
55.	FC Annay (11)	1–0	RC Ardrésien (9)
56.	FC Brebières (14)	0–7	SC Douai (7)
57.	US Saint-Maurice Loos-en-Gohelle (6)	2–0	Olympique Lumbrois (6)
58.	US Mineurs Waziers (7)	2–3	ES Lambresienne (6)
59.	AS Crémarest (12)	0–6	US Saint-Omer (5)
60.	ES Éleu (13)	0–4	FC Raismes (7)
61.	ES Calaisis Coulogne (8)	1–0	ES Sainte-Catherine (9)
62.	US Marquette (8)	1–6	Iris Club de Croix (5)
63.	ES Saint-Omer Rural (10)	0–2	US Vermelles (7)
64.	JS Racquinghem (13)	0–7	US Nœux-les-Mines (6)
65.	US Izel-lès-Équerchin (14)	0–3	AS Brebières (11)
66.	Avion République FC (13)	1–4	FC Porto Portugais Amiens (7)
67.	USO Meurchin (10)	1–4	ESC Longueau (6)
68.	Stade Orchésien (9)	1–4	AS Marck (6)
69.	RC Amiens (8)	10–2	ES Harondel (9)
70.	US Bavay (8)	0–3	Saint-Amand FC (6)
71.	ES Saulty (13)	2–2 (3–1 p)	US Beuvry (11)
72.	Amiens RIF (9)	0–6	US Maubeuge (5)
73.	AS Beuvry-la-Forêt (7)	3–0	SC Coquelles (7)
74.	AS Prouzel-Plachy (13)	1–2	USM Marly (9)
75.	SC Pro Patria Wingles (8)	0–1	US Lille Moulins Carrel (8)
76.	OSM Lomme (9)	1–1 (1–4 p)	AAE Chaulnes (8)
77.	FR Englebelmer (10)	1–2	RC Labourse (9)
78.	EC Mazingarbe (10)	2–5	US Saint-André (6)
79.	US Noyelles-sous-Lens (9)	1–3	AS du Pays Neslois (7)
80.	US Rosières (10)	4–3	US Saint-Quentin-Bléssy (9)
81.	US Boubers-Conchy (13)	2–1	ES Formerie (11)
82.	RC Creil Agglo (13)	1–1 (2–4 p)	FC Méaulte (10)
83.	CS Pernes (13)	1–5	FC Liancourt-Clermont (8)
84.	US Crèvecœur-le-Grand (10)	4–0	USE Saint-Leu d'Esserent (8)
85.	JS Thieux (11)	1–1 (4–3 p)	US Balagny-Saint-Epin (7)
86.	CS Habarcq (12)	3–2	AS Frévent (12)
87.	AJ Laboissière-en-Thelle (9)	1–5	US Camon (6)
88.	AS Auneuil (10)	1–8	US Breteuil (7)
89.	US Roye-Noyon (6)	1–1 (6–5 p)	CS Chaumont-en-Vexin (6)
90.	AS Allonne (9)	1–2	FC La Montoye (8)
91.	US Lamorlaye (9)	0–7	AC Amiens (5)
92.	FC Cauffry (10)	0–0 (5–4 p)	FC Camblain-Châtelain (11)
93.	Arras FA (6)	6–4	US Gouvieux (7)
94.	US Monchy-au-Bois (10)	2–2 (5–4 p)	Olympique Le Hamel (9)
95.	FC Givenchy-en-Gohelle (14)	4–1	AS La Neuville-sur-Oudeuil (10)
96.	ES Pigeonnier Amiens (8)	1–4	US Saint-Pol-sur-Ternoise (8)
97.	AS Rethonvillers Biarre Marché (13)	1–11	US Biachoise (7)
98.	Poix-Blangy-Croixrault FC (10)	1–3	Montdidier AC (8)
99.	AS Noyers-Saint-Martin (11)	1–1 (5–6 p)	SC Saint-Just-en-Chaussée (8)
100.	Fraternelle Ailly-sur-Noye (10)	0–7	AFC Creil (8)
101.	US Seboncourt (10)	0–3	CAS Escaudœuvres (6)
102.	Sports Podéens Réunis (9)	1–3	Écureuils Itancourt-Neuville (6)
103.	ES Villers-Outréaux (8)	5–0	FC Essigny-le-Grand (9)
104.	FC Fresnoy Fonsomme (10)	1–6	Feignies Aulnoye FC (5)
105.	US Berlaimont (9)	5–0	Harly Quentin (9)
106.	US Ribemont Mezieres FC (7)	2–1	RC Bohain (8)
107.	Wignehies Olympique (12)	0–7	US Vervins (8)
108.	AFC Colleret (13)	1–3	US Bruyères-et-Montbérault (9)
109.	ES Paillencourt-Estrun (10)	1–3	US Glageon (10)
110.	US Gommegnies-Carnoy (10)	1–2	AS Beaurevoir (10)
111.	AS Hautmont (8)	0–0 (4–2 p)	ES Montcornet (9)
112.	ES Caudry (9)	1–1 (2–3 p)	FC Avesnes-sur-Helpe (7)
113.	ESUS Buironfosse-La Capelle (10)	0–1	AC Cambrai (6)
114.	SC Fontaine-au-Pire (13)	0–4	US Laon (6)
115.	SAS Moy de l'Aisne (8)	1–6	US Jeumont (9)
116.	Entente Ligny/Olympique Caullery (10)	1–2	FC Lesdins (10)
117.	FC Provillois (10)	3–0	ES Clacy-Mons (10)
118.	FC Neuville-Saint-Rémy (11)	0–3	US Walincourt-Selvigny (9)
119.	US Saint-Aubert (9)	1–3	US Fourmies (8)
120.	ES Boussois (10)	1–0	US Vadencourt (10)
121.	SC Lamotte Breuil (10)	2–4	Canly FC (10)
122.	SC Flixecourt (9)	1–0	Stade Ressontois (9)
123.	Septmonts OC (9)	2–3	Choisy-au-Bac (6)
124.	AS Quesnoy-le-Montant (14)	0–3 (Note: Tie won by means of forfeit.)	ES Valois Multien (6)
125.	Avenir de l'Étoile (12)	0–3	AC Hallencourt (11)
126.	Château Thierry-Étampes FC (8)	1–1 (5–3 p)	USM Senlisienne (6)
127.	US Abbeville (8)	3–1	FC Béthisy (8)
128.	AS Pavant (12)	0–8	AFC Compiègne (6)
129.	Tricot OS (10)	0–2	US Saint-Maximin (7)
130.	US Vallée de l'Ailette (13)	0–0 (0–2 p)	US Friville-Escarbotin (8)
131.	FC Centuloise (8)	1–4	AS Gamaches (7)
132.	Avenir Nouvion-en-Ponthieu (11)	1–3	FC Saint-Valéry Baie de Somme Sud (9)
133.	US Nogent (7)	3–0	SC Abbeville (6)
134.	BCV FC (9)	4–2	AS Silly-le-Long (10)
135.	US Verberie (11)	3–2	Tergnier FC (8)
136.	ES Compiègne (11)	1–1 (3–4 p)	CS Villeneuve Saint-Germain (8)
137.	ES Ormoy-Duvy (9)	0–5	Internationale Soissonnaise (7)
138.	UA Fère-en-Tardenois (9)	0–6	US Chauny (6)
139.	CS Crécy-en-Ponthieu (10)	2–1	AS Valines (10)
140.	JS Miannay-Moyenneville-Lambercourt (7)	1–3	US Chantilly (5)

=== Fourth round ===
These matches were played on 3 and 4 October 2020.

Fourth round results: Hauts-de-France
Tie no	Home team (tier)	Score	Away team (tier)
1.	US Breteuil (7)	1–2	AFC Compiègne (6)
2.	AS Berck (9)	1–2	FC Porto Portugais Amiens (7)
3.	AC Hallencourt (11)	2–2 (4–5 p)	US Friville-Escarbotin (8)
4.	US Rosières (10)	3–1	FC La Montoye (8)
5.	US Verberie (11)	1–9	ES Valois Multien (6)
6.	AS Outreau (6)	1–1 (4–3 p)	AS Gamaches (7)
7.	US Crèvecœur-le-Grand (10)	1–0	RC Amiens (8)
8.	CS Crécy-en-Ponthieu (10)	0–9	Arras FA (6)
9.	FC Cauffry (10)	1–9	Stade Portelois (6)
10.	Montdidier AC (8)	0–3	ESC Longueau (6)
11.	US Saint-Pol-sur-Ternoise (8)	0–0 (3–4 p)	Choisy-au-Bac (6)
12.	FC Méaulte (10)	0–1	SC Saint-Just-en-Chaussée (8)
13.	JS Thieux (11)	3–7	AS du Pays Neslois (7)
14.	AFC Creil (8)	3–2	US Montreuil (9)
15.	US Abbeville (8)	0–2	US Nogent (7)
16.	SC Flixecourt (9)	0–3	AC Amiens (5)
17.	FC Saint-Valéry Baie de Somme Sud (9)	0–6	AS Beauvais Oise (4)
18.	Canly FC (10)	0–3 (Note: Tie won by means of forfeit.)	AS Étaples (7)
19.	FC Avesnes-sur-Helpe (7)	1–1 (3–4 p)	Feignies Aulnoye FC (5)
20.	FC Provillois (10)	1–0	AAE Chaulnes (8)
21.	US Hordain (8)	0–0 (2–4 p)	RC Labourse (9)
22.	US Glageon (10)	0–5	CAS Escaudœuvres (6)
23.	BCV FC (9)	0–2	US Ribemont Mezieres FC (7)
24.	US Walincourt-Selvigny (9)	2–2 (6–7 p)	US Bruyères-et-Montbérault (9)
25.	AS Brebières (11)	3–1	AS Beaurevoir (10)
26.	FC Lesdins (10)	1–0	US Fourmies (8)
27.	US Vervins (8)	0–1	US Chauny (6)
28.	ES Boussois (10)	1–1 (5–4 p)	FC Liancourt-Clermont (8)
29.	ES Saulty (13)	0–1	US Jeumont (9)
30.	US Berlaimont (9)	0–0 (5–4 p)	US Saint-Maximin (7)
31.	AS Hautmont (8)	0–1	US Laon (6)
32.	ES Villers-Outréaux (8)	0–2	Olympique Saint-Quentin (4)
33.	AC Cambrai (6)	3–3 (6–5 p)	Internationale Soissonnaise (7)
34.	Château Thierry-Étampes FC (8)	0–4	Écureuils Itancourt-Neuville (6)
35.	CS Villeneuve Saint-Germain (8)	0–4	US Maubeuge (5)
36.	US Vermelles (7)	1–4	US Roye-Noyon (6)
37.	US Boubers-Conchy (13)	0–12	US Vimy (5)
38.	AS Loos Oliveaux (10)	0–4	US Nœux-les-Mines (6)
39.	ES Lambresienne (6)	3–0	US Escaudain (7)
40.	Saint-Saulve Foot (9)	0–4	AS Beuvry-la-Forêt (7)
41.	US Provin (8)	1–1 (1–3 p)	US Chantilly (5)
42.	FC Annay (11)	0–0 (3–4 p)	Olympique Marcquois Football (5)
43.	US Bourthes (9)	1–4	SC Douai (7)
44.	AS Sailly-Labourse (11)	0–2	FC Madeleinois (8)
45.	USO Bruay-la-Buissière (8)	2–0	JS Longuenesse (8)
46.	Stella Lys (9)	1–4	FC Seclin (7)
47.	FC Bondues (7)	2–3	US Lesquin (6)
48.	UC Divion (10)	0–1	US Saint-Maurice Loos-en-Gohelle (6)
49.	USM Marly (9)	1–1 (5–4 p)	US Monchy-au-Bois (10)
50.	FC Givenchy-en-Gohelle (14)	2–2 (4–5 p)	US Hergnies (12)
51.	UAS Harnes (8)	3–1	OSM Sequedin (9)
52.	CS Habarcq (12)	1–5	US Camon (6)
53.	Saint-Amand FC (6)	1–1 (3–4 p)	US Saint-André (6)
54.	US Biachoise (7)	3–0	AS Baisieux Patro (8)
55.	US Gravelines (6)	1–3	US Tourcoing FC (6)
56.	Grand Calais Pascal FC (7)	3–0	OC Roubaisien (8)
57.	Olympique Grande-Synthe (6)	1–3	AS Steenvorde (6)
58.	US Lestrem (10)	0–8	Leers OF (8)
59.	US Aulnoy (9)	1–1 (4–1 p)	IC Lambersart (7)
60.	FC Raismes (7)	2–1	JS Lille Wazemmes (8)
61.	US Téteghem (9)	2–0	USO Rinxent (10)
62.	USCC Saint-Pol-sur-Mer (9)	0–0 (3–2 p)	FC Recques-sur-Hem (9)
63.	US Ascq (7)	1–1 (4–5 p)	Wasquehal Football (5)
64.	US Lille Moulins Carrel (8)	0–0 (3–4 p)	OS Fives (7)
65.	Calais Beau-Marais (8)	0–0 (2–4 p)	SC Hazebrouck (6)
66.	US Yser (9)	6–3	OS Annequin (9)
67.	SC Bailleulois (8)	1–1 (9–8 p)	ES Calaisis Coulogne (8)
68.	JA Armentières (9)	1–4	FC Loon-Plage (6)
69.	Anzin FARC (10)	0–3	AS Marck (6)
70.	US Nielles-lès-Bléquin (9)	1–7	OS Aire-sur-la-Lys (7)
71.	Iris Club de Croix (5)	1–2	US Saint-Omer (5)

=== Fifth round ===
These matches were played on 17 and 18 October 2020.

Fifth round results: Hauts-de-France
Tie no	Home team (tier)	Score	Away team (tier)
1.	SC Hazebrouck (6)	1–1 (2–3 p)	US Saint-Maurice Loos-en-Gohelle (6)
2.	Choisy-au-Bac (6)	0–2	Olympique Saint-Quentin (4)
3.	US Rosières (10)	0–4	ES Lambresienne (6)
4.	FC Provillois (10)	0–2	AS Steenvorde (6)
5.	US Aulnoy (9)	0–3	FC Loon-Plage (6)
6.	AS Brebières (11)	1–1 (2–4 p)	USM Marly (9)
7.	FC Lesdins (10)	0–6	US Chantilly (5)
8.	OS Fives (7)	2–1	FC Raismes (7)
9.	US Tourcoing FC (6)	1–1 (7–6 p)	Wasquehal Football (5)
10.	USO Bruay-la-Buissière (8)	0–0 (3–4 p)	US Laon (6)
11.	CAS Escaudœuvres (6)	0–2	US Maubeuge (5)
12.	AS du Pays Neslois (7)	2–2 (2–4 p)	US Biachoise (7)
13.	AS Beuvry-la-Forêt (7)	2–1	US Roye-Noyon (6)
14.	US Bruyères-et-Montbérault (9)	0–9	Écureuils Itancourt-Neuville (6)
15.	US Ribemont Mezieres FC (7)	0–3	AC Cambrai (6)
16.	Leers OF (8)	2–2 (4–3 p)	US Chauny (6)
17.	US Jeumont (9)	3–1	FC Madeleinois (8)
18.	AFC Creil (8)	1–2	AS Marck (6)
19.	US Lesquin (6)	2–0	Grand Calais Pascal FC (7)
20.	US Crèvecœur-le-Grand (10)	3–1	US Yser (9)
21.	US Téteghem (9)	1–1 (5–6 p)	SC Bailleulois (8)
22.	SC Saint-Just-en-Chaussée (8)	0–6	US Camon (6)
23.	RC Labourse (9)	6–0	US Friville-Escarbotin (8)
24.	Stade Portelois (6)	0–3	US Boulogne (3)
25.	US Berlaimont (9)	1–0	US Saint-André (6)
26.	FC Seclin (7)	0–1	AS Étaples (7)
27.	US Hergnies (12)	0–10	Arras FA (6)
28.	UAS Harnes (8)	2–4	Olympique Marcquois Football (5)
29.	AS Beauvais Oise (4)	2–1	Feignies Aulnoye FC (5)
30.	ES Boussois (10)	0–3	OS Aire-sur-la-Lys (7)
31.	ES Valois Multien (6)	3–1	FC Porto Portugais Amiens (7)
32.	AC Amiens (5)	4–1	US Vimy (5)
33.	USCC Saint-Pol-sur-Mer (9)	0–6	ESC Longueau (6)
34.	US Nogent (7)	0–1	AFC Compiègne (6)
35.	US Nœux-les-Mines (6)	4–1	AS Outreau (6)
36.	SC Douai (7)	1–2	US Saint-Omer (5)

=== Sixth round ===
These matches were played on 30 and 31 January 2021.

Sixth round results: Hauts-de-France
Tie no	Home team (tier)	Score	Away team (tier)
1.	US Jeumont (9)	1–5	OS Aire-sur-la-Lys (7)
2.	US Chantilly (5)	3–0	AFC Compiègne (6)
3.	US Biachoise (7)	2–2 (2–3 p)	US Lesquin (6)
4.	US Nœux-les-Mines (6)	2–5	AC Amiens (5)
5.	Leers OF (8)	1–2	FC Loon-Plage (6)
6.	Écureuils Itancourt-Neuville (6)	2–1	ES Valois Multien (6)
7.	AS Marck (6)	1–1 (6–7 p)	Olympique Saint-Quentin (4)
8.	US Camon (6)	1–3	Arras FA (6)
9.	US Tourcoing FC (6)	0–3 (Note: US Tourcoing FC forfeited the tie, stating they would not play under the current conditions relating to COVID-19.)	US Boulogne (3)
10.	AS Étaples (7)	0–1	Olympique Marcquois Football (5)
11.	USM Marly (9)	0–3	ES Lambresienne (6)
12.	US Crèvecœur-le-Grand (10)	0–3	US Laon (6)
13.	AS Steenvorde (6)	5–1	OS Fives (7)
14.	SC Bailleulois (8)	2–1	AS Beuvry-la-Forêt (7)
15.	US Maubeuge (5)	0–0 (2–3 p)	AS Beauvais Oise (4)
16.	ESC Longueau (6)	4–0	AC Cambrai (6)
17.	RC Labourse (9)	1–6	US Saint-Maurice Loos-en-Gohelle (6)
18.	US Berlaimont (9)	0–3 (Note: US Berlaimont forfeited the tie, stating they would not play under the current conditions relating to COVID-19.)	US Saint-Omer (5)
