= Bernard Ledru =

French footballer and manager

Personal information
- Date of birth: 28 March 1937
- Place of birth: Oppy, Pas-de-Calais, France
- Date of death: 4 September 2009 (aged 72)
- Place of death: France

Senior career*
Years	Team	Apps	(Gls)
1959–1963	CO Roubaix-Tourcoing		
1963–1968	AS Aulnoye		

Managerial career
- 1968–1983: Douai
- 1983–1985: Calais
- 1985–1993: Douai
- * Club domestic league appearances and goals

Bernard Ledru (28 March 1937 – 4 September 2009) was a French footballer and manager who oversaw SC Douai for 15 years, from 1968 until 1983.

== Career ==
Born in Oppy, Pas-de-Calais on 28 March 1937, Ledru began his football career at the professional team CO Roubaix-Tourcoing (CORT) in the late 1950s, from which he joined AS Aulnoye, one of the best amateur clubs in France, with whom he played until 1967, when he retired following a tibia-fibula fracture from which he never recovered. After his career as a player ended, Ledru remained linked to the world of football, now as a coach, earning his coaching diplomas in 1968, aged 31. Employed in the Douai's green spaces department, he occupied an office regarding the grounds of Stade Demeny, the stadium of SC Douai, whose president was also the mayor of Douai, Charles Fenain, who appointed Ledru as the club's coach.

Ledru was noted for his recruitment expertise, but he was best known for his youth policy, as he fielded several young players who were trained at the club. He was also a man of conviction, pragmatism, and vision, structuring the club and guiding his side to a promotion to DH in 1974, and later to Ligue 3 in the late 1970s. In the early 1980s, the club narrowly missed out on promotion to Ligue 2 on several occasions, but even though they were at the top of amateur football, the club failed to became professional due to a lack of support from the city. He stayed at the helm of Douai for 15 years, from 1968 until 1983, when he took over Calais, which he oversaw for just two years, until 1985, when he decided to return to a struggling Douai, remaining there until 1993. (Note: Some sources wrongly claim that he oversaw Douai for 25 consecutive years, from 1968 until 1993.)

When a shot went well over the crossbar, Ledru would often say, "Hello, NASA?".

== Death and legacy ==
Ledru died on 4 September 2009, at the age of 72, and the funeral took place a few days later, on 10 September, in Montauroux. Following his death, Jean-Marie Heintz, who had been his teammate at Aulnoye, the captain of his Douai team, and then the club's president, described him as "a great man".

Two years after his death, in September 2011, the club inaugurated its latest-generation synthetic pitch at the Demény stadium, which was renamed after Ledru; his two sons, Marc and Alain, were present at the ceremony.

== See also ==
- List of longest managerial reigns in association football
