= SC Douai =

French football club

Team logo

Sporting Club de Douai is a French football club based in Douai, which was founded in 1919. It competed in Ligue 2 from 1945 to 1949, and the team currently plays in the 3rd division of its regional league, the 8th tier of French football.

Kostas Negrepontis, former manager of AEK Athens, played for SC Douai at the start of the 20th century. Its stadium, Stade Demeny, has a capacity of 2500.

One of SC Douai's best current players, Selim Benaissi is a Franco-Algerian attacking midfielder, who has had multiple spells in both France and Belgium. Also in their squad is Hugo Legrand, a 24-year-old French attacking midfielder, who formerly played for Le Touquet AC.

In the 2024–25 season, SC Douai went only as far as the second round of the Coupe de France, losing to FC Rouen 1899 5–1 at home.

== Managers ==
- 1945–1946: (France) Pierre Parmentier
- 1940s: (France) Albert Delcourt
- 1968–1993 : (France) Bernard Ledru
- 2005–2007 : (France) Jean-Luc Dewet
- 2009–2010 : (France) Patrice Selle
- 2010–10/2010 : (France) Reynald Dabrowski
- 10/2010–2011 : (France) Fabien Ibangue
- 2011–2012 : (Democratic Republic of the Congo) Mwinyi Zahera
- 2012–2013 : (France) Mehdi Benaïssi
- 2013–2017 : (France) Xavier Méride
- 2017 : (France) Daniel Leclercq
- 11/2017–11/2018 : (France) Ludovic Delporte
- 12/2018–2022 : (France) Xavier Méride
- 2022–Present: Lahcen Najih

== Notable players ==
- (France) César Ruminski
- (Germany) Stanislas Staho
- (France) Bruno Zboralski
- (France) Romain Pitau
- (France) Philippe Lefebvre
- (France) Léon Glowacki
- (France) Guillaume Bieganski
