= 2017–18 Coupe de France preliminary rounds, Hauts-de-France =

French football competition

The 2017–18 Coupe de France preliminary rounds Hauts-de-France make up the qualifying competition to decide which teams from the French Hauts-de-France region take part in the main competition from the seventh round.

== First round ==
The matches in Hauts-de-France were played on 26 and 27 August 2017.

First round results: Hauts-de-France

Tie no	Home team (tier)	Score	Away team (tier)
1.	CS Crécy-en-Ponthieu (11)	1–3	FC Centuloise (8)
2.	SC Bourbourg (10)	7–0	FC Méteren (13)
3.	ES St Omer Rural (11)	2–2 (1–3 p)	Recques FC (9)
4.	FC Essigny-le-Grand (10)	0–4	US Ribemont Mezieres FC (8)
5.	AS Audigny (12)	2–0	ASC St Michel (11)
6.	Chambry FC (12)	2–6	FC 3 Châteaux (10)
7.	CS Montescourt-Lizerolles (12)	0–4	Stade Portugais St Quentin (10)
8.	Septmonts OC (10)	2–4 (a.e.t.)	Union Sud Aisne FC (9)
9.	BCV FC (10)	2–4	CS Villeneuve St Germain (9)
10.	SC Flavy-le-Martel (13)	1–3	ASA Presles (9)
11.	Marle Sports (11)	2–4 (a.e.t.)	TFC Neuve-Maison (10)
12.	FC Lehaucourt (12)	1–4	AFC Holnon-Fayet (9)
13.	CS Aubenton (11)	1–8	Le Nouvion AC (9)
14.	ES Viry-Noureuil (12)	2–1	US Vallée de l'Ailette (10)
15.	ES Bourg-et-Comin/Beaurieux (13)	1–6	FC Villers Cotterêts (9)
16.	La Concorde de Bucy-les-Pierrepont (11)	1–4 (a.e.t.)	US Crépy Vivaise (9)
17.	ES Sequehart-Fonsomme-Levergies (13)	1–2	US Brissy-Hamégicourt (12)
18.	SC Montaigu (12)	0–3 (Note: SC Montaigu penalised for fielding a suspended player. US Coucy-lès-Eppes qualify for second round. Original scoreline unknown.)	US Coucy-lès-Eppes (11)
19.	US Rozoy-sur-Serre (10)	2–2 (4–2 p)	US Guise (8)
20.	Liesse-Marais (12)	0–3	US Prémontré St Gobain (8)
21.	AS Neuilly-St Front (10)	2–0	AS Milonaise (11)
22.	ES Ognes (11)	0–2	FC Amigny-Rouy (8)
23.	ALJ Necreux Sinceny (12)	0–1	US Aulnois-sous-Laon (12)
24.	CA St Simon (11)	0–8	Internationale Soissonnaise (8)
25.	FC Vaux-Andigny (12)	2–1 (a.e.t.)	Espoir Sains-Richaumont (11)
26.	ES Brancourt-le-Grand (13)	0–3	FC St Martin-Étreillers (12)
27.	CS Blérancourt (12)	2–1	FC Billy-sur-Aisne (10)
28.	AS Martigny (12)	0–1	ES Montcornet (8)
29.	FC Fonsomme (10)	0–4	SAS Moy de l'Aisne (8)
30.	US La Fère (11)	2–1 (a.e.t.)	FC Mézières (11)
31.	US Vadencourt (12)	0–5	ICS Créçois (7)
32.	FC Lesdins (11)	0–3	L'Arsenal Club Achery-Beautor-Charmes (8)
33.	ES Bucilly-Landouzy-Éparcy (12)	0–3	US Buire-Hirson-Thiérache (7)
34.	US Acy (12)	1–3	Entente Crouy-Cuffies (11)
35.	FC Monceau Les Leups (10)	1–0	UES Vermand (11)
36.	Ferté Chevresis FC (12)	2–10	ES Clacy-Mons (11)
37.	AS Ohis (12)	1–5	US Seboncourt (11)
38.	FJEP Coincy (11)	4–0	IEC Château-Thierry (10)
39.	CSO Athies-sous-Laon (11)	7–3	FC Fontainois (12)
40.	AS Pavant (12)	0–3	US des Vallées (11)
41.	ACSF Vic-sur-Aisne (12)	2–0	FC Vierzy (10)
42.	US Origny-Thenelles (11)	0–7	RC Bohain (8)
43.	FC Watigny (12)	0–2	SC Origny-en-Thiérache (11)
44.	AS Beaurevoir (10)	1–3	Harly Quentin (8)
45.	ASA Mont Notre-Dame (12)	0–3	US Venizel (10)
46.	FC Bucy-le-Long (11)	0–3 (Note: FC Bucy-le-Long penalised for fielding two suspended players. AS Gandelu qualify for the second round. Original scoreline unknown.)	AS Gandelu (12)
47.	FC Hannapes (12)	0–3 (Note: FC Hannapes penalised for fielding a suspended player. ESUS Buironfosse-La Capelle qualify for the second round. Original scoreline unknown.)	ESUS Buironfosse-La Capelle (10)
48.	US Étreaupont (12)	0–4	US Vervins (10)
49.	Espérance Calonne Liévin (11)	4#1	AOSC Sallaumines (10)
50.	Fraternelle des Cheminots de Laon (12)	1–2	US Bruyères-et-Montbérault (8)
51.	ASPTT Laon (12)	2–3 (a.e.t.)	Gauchy-Grugies St Quentin FC (8)
52.	FFC Chéry-lès-Pouilly (10)	0–2	US Sissonne (10)
53.	US Anizy-Pinon (12)	1–0	AS Barenton-Bugny (12)
54.	AS Barlin (12)	1–1 (2–3 p)	ESD Isbergues (9)
55.	AS Tincquizel (10)	0–3	OS Annequin (11)
56.	EC Mazingarbe (12)	0–6	US Noyelles-sous-Lens (9)
57.	CS Dammard (13)	0–12	UA Fère-en-Tardenois (9)
58.	FC Hauts de Lens (15)	3–3 (4–3 p)	Sud Artois (12)
59.	FC Kennedy Béthune (13)	1–4	COS Marles-Lozinghem (10)
60.	UC Divion (12)	0–2	US Gonnehem-Busnettes (10)
61.	ES Angres (13)	1–1 (2–3 p)	USO Lens (10)
62.	ES Laventie (10)	5–1	US Rouvroy (11)
63.	RC Sains (12)	1–4	AG Grenay (10)
64.	AS Neuvireuil-Gavrelle (13)	0–5	US Croisilles (10)
65.	ES Éleu (15)	0–3	RC Labourse (11)
66.	JF Mazingarbe (13)	1–4	AFCL Liebaut (10)
67.	AS Brebières (13)	3–1	Olympique Héninois (12)
68.	JF Guarbecque (11)	0–1	ES Haisnes (12)
69.	US Grenay (13)	0–1	FC Hinges (13)
70.	FC Annay (14)	1–0 (a.e.t.)	AS Lensoise (11)
71.	Auchel FC (13)	2–3 (a.e.t.)	ES Labeuvrière (10)
72.	US Lestrem (11)	6–0	Olympique Burbure (12)
73.	CS Habarcq (13)	1–1 (5–3 p)	AS Beaurains (11)
74.	FC Dainvillois (13)	0–7	ES St Laurent-Blangy (11)
75.	US Cheminots Avion (12)	2–1	AAE Dourges (11)
76.	JS Écourt-St Quentin (11)	3–0 (Note: AS Courrièroise penalised for fielding a suspended player. JS Écourt-St Quentin qualify for the second round. Original scoreline 2–1.)	AS Courrièroise (12)
77.	AAE Aix-Noulette (12)	2–2 (3–1 p)	USA Liévin (11)
78.	ES Ste Catherine (11)	4–0	AJ Artois (12)
79.	US Annezin (12)	0–2	ES Anzin-St Aubin (12)
80.	US Mondicourt (14)	4–3	Tilloy FC (11)
81.	AS Loison (12)	1–3	Olympique Liévin (11)
82.	CS Diana Liévin (11)	1–0	USO Meurchin (10)
83.	US Rivière (15)	3–2	AC Noyelles-Godault (11)
84.	AS Maroeuil (13)	1–2	AAE Évin-Malmaison (12)
85.	FC La Roupie-Isbergues (14)	4–1	US Beuvry (12)
86.	AS Calonne-sur-la-Lys (16)	1–3 (a.e.t.)	FC Lillers (13)
87.	FC Hersin (14)	0–4	AS Sailly-Labourse (12)
88.	CS Pernes (12)	2–2 (8–7 p)	ES Douvrin (13)
89.	AS Quiéry-la-Motte (14)	2–3	FC Servins (14)
90.	AS Bapaume-Bertincourt-Vaulx-Vraucourt (13)	0–1	US Ruch Carvin (12)
91.	US Arleux-en-Gohelle (12)	3–4	AO Hermies (12)
92.	USO Drocourt (13)	3–1	ES Haillicourt (13)
93.	FC Beaumont (14)	1–2 (a.e.t.)	AS Violaines (12)
94.	SC Fouquières (13)	2–1	UAS Harnes (12)
95.	Renaissance Estrée-Blanche (15)	3–1	US Boubers-Conchy (14)
96.	Verquigneul FC (14)	0–2	US Houdain (12)
97.	Olympique Arras (16)	0–0 (7–6 p)	ASPTT Arras (12)
98.	US Monchy-au-Bois (12)	7–2	ES Bois-Bernard-Acheville (13)
99.	ES Val Sensée (14)	0–3	US Pas-en-Artois (12)
100.	Intrépides Norrent-Fontes (14)	0–3	ES Vendin (12)
101.	Entente Verquin-Béthune (15)	2–7	US Hesdigneul (13)
102.	ES Saulty (15)	1–5	ASC Camblain-l'Abbé (13)
103.	AJ Ruitz (15)	4–1	Stade Héninois (15)
104.	US Maisnil (15)	2–1 (a.e.t.)	US Lapugnoy (13)
105.	AS Noyelles-lés-Vermelles (14)	2–1	AS Auchy-les-Mines (13)
106.	AJ Neuville (15)	1–0	OC Cojeul (13)
107.	US Izel-lès-Équerchin (15)	2–0	AS Roclincourt (14)
108.	AS Vallée de la Ternoise (14)	5–1	FC Busnes (14)
109.	RC Avesnes-le-Comte (14)	0–4	AS Cauchy-à-la-Tour (14)
110.	US Ablain (14)	3–0	AS Robecq (14)
111.	SC Aubigny/Savy-Berlette Association (14)	3–1	CSAL Souchez (14)
112.	La Couture FC (12)	3–4	FC Montigny-en-Gohelle (10)
113.	JS Racquinghem (13)	3–0	US Coyecques (14)
114.	JS Achiet-le-Petit (15)	2–3	ES Buissy-Baralle (15)
115.	US Ham-en-Artois (15)	3–2 (a.e.t.)	Olympique Vendin (14)
116.	AS Berneville (15)	1–1 (5–3 p)	FC Estevelles (15)
117.	LC Léglantiers (14)	0–3	FC Angy (10)
118.	Diables Rouges Lambres-lez-Aire (13)	2–4	AS Frévent (12)
119.	AS Verneuil-en-Halatte (10)	5–2	ES Thiers-sur-Thève (13)
120.	FC La Neuville-Roy (12)	1–0	ESC Wavignies (10)
121.	FC Boran (11)	0–2	US St Maximin (8)
122.	AS Maignelay-Montigny (13)	0–1	CS Haudivillers (10)
123.	AS Breuil-le-Vert (11)	1–2	FC Nointel (9)
124.	AS Noyers-Saint-Martin (12)	2–1	FCJ Noyon (14)
125.	Rollot AC (13)	2–3	US Breuil-le-Sec (11)
126.	RC Campremy (12)	0–2	Stade Ressontois (10)
127.	JS Bulles (12)	1–2	AS St Sauveur (Oise) (9)
128.	US Estrées-St Denis (9)	4–0 (a.e.t.)	US Villers-St Paul (9)
129.	US Mouy (12)	2–4	Canly FC (11)
130.	FC Sacy-St Martin (11)	1–2	US Froissy (11)
131.	FC Ruraville (14)	0–3	AS Laigneville (11)
132.	US Bresloise (10)	1–4	US Pont Ste-Maxence (7)
133.	Tricot OS (11)	1–1 (4–1 p)	US Paillart (10)
134.	AJ Laboissière-en-Thelle (10)	3–1	FC Cauffry (9)
135.	JS Thieux (12)	0–0 (4–2 p)	RC Précy (11)
136.	ES Remy (12)	1–0 (a.e.t.)	FC Liancourt-Clermont (8)
137.	OC Bury (11)	0–4	SC St Just-en-Chaussée (7)
138.	AS Montmacq (12)	2–5	AS Multien (12)
139.	FC Carlepont (10)	0–3	AS Orry-La-Chapelle (10)
140.	US Pierrefonds (13)	4–2	FC Conchy-Boulogne (14)
141.	JSA Compiègne-La Croix-St Ouen (9)	2–2 (4–3 p)	US Nogent (7)
142.	FC Clairoix (10)	0–2	US Gouvieux (9)
143.	FC Salency (13)	3–3 (5–4 p)	SC Lamotte Breuil (10)
144.	US Beuvraignes (12)	1–4	AS Tracy-le-Mont (11)
145.	FC Chiry-Ourscamp (13)	2–6	FC Muirancourt (11)
146.	AS Silly-le-Long (10)	3–1	ES Compiègne (11)
147.	US Attichy (14)	3–0	ES Pays Noyonnais (12)
148.	US Ribécourt (9)	3–2	US Crépy-en-Valois (8)
149.	CS Avilly-St Léonard (10)	1–1 (3–4 p)	US Margny-lès-Compiègne (9)
150.	ES Roquetoire (12)	3–0 (Note: JS Renescuroise penalised for fielding three suspended players. ES Roquetoire qualify for the second round. Original scoreline 3–3 (5–3 p).)	JS Renescuroise (11)
151.	JS Guiscard (13)	1–2	US Baugy-Monchy Humières (11)
152.	US Lamorlaye (9)	2–1	FC Longueil-Annel (8)
153.	AS Mareuil-sur-Ourcq (13)	1–1 (1–3 p)	ES Ormoy-Duvy (12)
154.	AS Péroy-les-Gombries (13)	0–1	CA Venette (11)
155.	US Lassigny (10)	0–1	FC Béthisy (8)
156.	FC Longueil-St Marie (12)	0–4	US Plessis-Brion (11)
157.	AS Plailly (10)	1–4	ES Valois Multien (7)
158.	FC Portugais Compiègne (13)	1–2	ASC Val d'Automne (11)
159.	CSM Mesnil-en-Thelle (11)	0–3	US Fouquenies (9)
160.	SC Les Marettes (14)	0–6	FC Fontainettes St Aubin (12)
161.	Villers FC (13)	1–2	SCC Sérifontaine (11)
162.	AS Ons-en-Bray (11)	0–2	Grandvilliers AC (10)
163.	FC St Sulpice (13)	1–3	US Crèvecœur-le-Grand (10)
164.	AS La Neuville-sur-Oudeuil (11)	6–1	ES Formerie (10)
165.	FC Cempuis (12)	3–4	US Marseille-en-Beauvaisis (10)
166.	JS Moliens (13)	2–3	AS Noailles-Cauvigny (11)
167.	US Ste Geneviève (13)	3–4	ASPTT Beauvais (11)
168.	FC Jouy-sous-Thelle (12)	3–1	ES Le Mesnil-Théribus (13)
169.	US St Germer-de-Fly (11)	0–4	SC Songeons (9)
170.	FC Esches-Fosseuse (10)	3–0	US Cires-lès-Mello (8)
171.	AS Verderel-lès-Sauqueuse (12)	2–1	AS Montchrevreuil (10)
172.	USC Portugais de Beauvais (10)	2–5	USE St Leu d'Esserent (8)
173.	FC St Paul (12)	1–2	AS Auneuil (10)
174.	AS Bornel (12)	1–3	CO Beauvais (9)
175.	USR St Crépin-Ibouvillers (9)	0–2 (a.e.t.)	AS Allonne (8)
176.	Hermes-Berthecourt AC (9)	1–5	CS Chaumont-en-Vexin (7)
177.	RC Blargies (13)	3–1	EC Villers/Bailleul (11)
178.	AS Hénonville (13)	6–2	FC St Just des Marais (12)
179.	SC Moreuil (10)	4–2	US Meru Sandricourt (8)
180.	US Colembert (13)	0–7	RC Samer (10)
181.	US Coulomby (14)	0–5	AS Hallines (11)
182.	FC Calais Catena (12)	2–0	JS Bonningues-lès-Ardres (13)
183.	US Élinghen-Ferques (15)	1–6	AS St Tricat/Nielles (13)
184.	FC Wierre-au-Bois (15)	1–5	FC La Capelle (12)
185.	US Dannes (12)	1–2	Éclair Neufchâtel-Hardelot (11)
186.	USM Boulogne-sur-Mer (15)	2–5	US Marais de Gûines (11)
187.	AS Tournehem (11)	0–4	FC Campagne-lès-Guines (10)
188.	US Courcelles (13)	4–0	SC Artésien (11)
189.	CO Wimille (10)	1–0	AS Wimereux (11)
190.	ES Herbelles-Pihem-Inghem (13)	1–5	US Bourthes (11)
191.	AS Bezinghem (12)	2–0	US Créquy-Planquette (11)
192.	US Frencq (12)	2–3	AS Rang-du-Fliers (13)
193.	AS Gazelec Boulogne (15)	0–5	ES St Léonard (10)
194.	FC Isques (14)	0–1 (a.e.t.)	CAP Le Portel (11)
195.	RC Offekerque (13)	1–0 (a.e.t.)	FJEP Fort Vert (11)
196.	RC Brêmes-les-Ardres (15)	2–6	US Attaquoise (12)
197.	AS Crémarest (13)	1–2	FC Conti (11)
198.	FC Wizernes (15)	0–3	CS Watten (11)
199.	US Bomy (15)	3–0 (Note: AS St Martin-au-Laërt penalised for fielding a suspended player. US Bomy qualify for the second round. Original scoreline 0–6.)	AS St Martin-au-Laërt (12)
200.	ASL Vieil-Moutier La Calique (12)	3–2 (a.e.t.)	US Polincove (13)
201.	ADF Ruminghem (14)	1–2	FC Fréthun (14)
202.	CA Éperlecques (11)	4–0	ASC Arc International (12)
203.	RC Bréquerecque Ostrohove (12)	2–3	US Marquise (10)
204.	AS Surques-Escœuilles (13)	1–9	ESL Boulogne-sur-Mer (11)
205.	US Verchocq-Ergny-Herly (13)	3–1	JS Créquoise Loison (13)
206.	US Hardinghen (13)	0–1	Calais Beau-Marais (10)
207.	FC Senlecques (13)	5–0	FC Wailly-Beaucamp (13)
208.	FC Merlimont (13)	1–4	ES Beaurainville (11)
209.	SL Alincthun (14)	0–3	FLC Longfossé (11)
210.	Amicale Balzac (12)	3–2 (a.e.t.)	US Landrethun-le-Nord (10)
211.	US Porteloise (11)	0–3	JS Desvroise (9)
212.	FCP Blendecques (11)	3–4 (a.e.t.)	US Nielles-lès-Bléquin (10)
213.	AS Campagne-lès-Hesdin (11)	4–1	US Vieil-Hesdin (12)
214.	US Bonningues-lès-Calais (14)	2–1	US Alquines (12)
215.	RC Lottinghen (15)	0–6	US Équihen-Plage (11)
216.	JS Condette (12)	1–4	US Attin (10)
217.	AS Boisjean (14)	0–3	AF Étaples Haute Ville (11)
218.	FC Wavrans-sur-l'Aa (11)	2–1	US Conteville/Wierre-Effroy (12)
219.	US Dohem-Avroult-Cléty (12)	0–1	US Quiestède (10)
220.	US Brimeux (12)	1–7	Union St Loupoise (13)
221.	US Outreau (13)	1–4	US Hesdin-l'Abbé (11)
222.	US Blaringhem (10)	1–2	FC Wardrecques (11)
223.	CF Hemmes de Marck (14)	4–2	FC Wissant (15)
224.	FC Dynamo Carvin Fosse 4 (15)	2–1	AS Pont-á-Vendin (14)
225.	AS Glisy (12)	1–0	Poix-Blangy-Croixrault FC (11)
226.	AEP St Inglevert (15)	0–4	USO Rinxent (10)
227.	US Thérouanne (13)	2–2 (4–2 p)	US Vaudringhem (12)
228.	AS Maresquel (13)	2–1	AS Auchy-lès-Hesdin (12)
229.	US Vallée du Bras de Brosne (14)	0–3	AS Fruges (13)
230.	AS Esquerdes (14)	1–4	Longuenesse Malafoot (12)
231.	Quartier Genty Berck (15)	2–3	Gouy-St André RC (14)
232.	AS Calais (15)	1–7	FC Nordausques (11)
233.	Le Portel GPF (14)	2–3	Amicale Pont-de-Briques (13)
234.	CA Vieille-Église (13)	0–2	ES Oye-Plage (10)
235.	AS Cucq (10)	1–4	Olympique St Martin Boulogne (9)
236.	FC Ecques-Heuringhem (13)	0–3	AS Nortkerque 95 (10)
237.	ES Licques (11)	1–5	ACO Aiglon (9)
238.	JS Le Parcq (15)	1–8	AS Fillièvres (12)
239.	Verton FC (11)	1–2	AS Conchil-le-Temple (12)
240.	SLE Groffliers (15)	0–7	Olympique Hesdin-Marconne (9)
241.	RC Ardrésien (11)	3–0	ES Mametz (12)
242.	Red Star Jeumont (15)	1–0	AS Trélon (13)
243.	US Englefontaine (16)	3–1	AS Étrœungt (13)
244.	FC St Hilaire-sur-Helpe (14)	2–0	AS Dompierre (13)
245.	US Villersoise (14)	6–1	FC Jenlain (15)
246.	AS Preux-au-Bois (16)	1–3	SCEPS Pont-sur-Sambre (14)
247.	CA Sainsois (15)	1–6	AS Bellignies (11)
248.	US Cousolre (11)	3–0	AS La Longueville (11)
249.	US Beaufort/Limont-Fontaine (13)	3–2	FC Fontaine-au-Bois (16)
250.	US Fourmies (9)	2–0	FC Epinette-Maubeuge (11)
251.	SC Bachant (13)	9–0	US Bousies (14)
252.	Maubeuge FCCA (13)	1–2	Sports Podéens Réunis (11)
253.	AS Douzies (9)	5–0	Maubeuge Olympique (15)
254.	FC Marpent (10)	3–1	US Gommegnies-Carnoy (10)
255.	US Glageon (13)	1–6	US Berlaimont (11)
256.	AFC Ferrière-la-Petite (14)	1–2	US Jeumont (11)
257.	AFC Colleret (14)	1–3	Olympique Maroilles (12)
258.	SC St Remy-du-Nord (13)	0–5	US Bavay (10)
259.	SA Le Quesnoy (13)	1–0	Wignehies Olympique (14)
260.	FC Leval (16)	0–1	US Rousies (13)
261.	JS Avesnelloise (16)	1–7	ES Boussois (12)
262.	US Landrecies (15)	1–3	AS Bourlon (13)
263.	IC Ferrière-la-Grande (12)	12–1	AS Obies (15)
264.	US Prisches (15)	4–7	OSC Assevent (12)
265.	US Villers-Pol (14)	2–1	AG Solrézienne (12)
266.	SS Marcoing (12)	1–4	ES Villers-Outréaux (9)
267.	US St Souplet (13)	3–2	US Fontaine-Notre-Dame (12)
268.	Entente Ligny/Olympique Caullery (14)	4–2	US Haussy (13)
269.	ES Haynecourt-Épinoy (13)	1–4	FC Saulzoir (12)
270.	St Vaast FC (14)	0–6	US Élincourt (11)
271.	US Briastre (16)	1–2	US Busigny (13)
272.	AS Masnières (11)	0–2	US St Aubert (11)
273.	SC Le Cateau (14)	0–1 (a.e.t.)	US Bertry-Clary (14)
274.	FC Cambrai-St Roch (14)	1–3	FC Pommereuil (15)
275.	US Rumilly (14)	0–3	FC Provillois (11)
276.	US Ors (14)	3–3 (3–2 p)	ES Paillencourt-Estrun (12)
277.	OM Cambrai Amérique (11)	9–1	SC Fontaine-au-Pire (15)
278.	US Quend (12)	3–3 (2–4 p)	SC Pont Remy (11)
279.	US Les Rues-des-Vignes (15)	1–0	AS Neuvilly (14)
280.	AS Lesdain (16)	4–2	FC Maretz (15)
281.	SC Lourches (13)	1–4	JO Wallers-Arenberg (11)
282.	AS Montay (15)	4–3 (a.e.t.)	FC Solesmes (13)
283.	AS Écureuils Metz-en-Couture (16)	0–7	FC Neuville-St Rémy (11)
284.	US Beauvois Fontaine (13)	0–3	ES Caudry (9)
285.	OC Avesnois (13)	7–0	Omnisports Séranvillers-Forenville (16)
286.	FC Iwuy (14)	1–0	US Quiévy (12)
287.	Olympique St Ollois (14)	0–2	US Walincourt-Selvigny (12)
288.	Olympique Landasien (12)	1–3	USAC Somain (10)
289.	DC Lallaing (15)	0–8	US Erre-Hornaing (11)
290.	AS Douai-Lambres Cheminots (13)	5–0	FC Estrées (14)
291.	US Pont Flers (12)	0–3 (Note: US Pont Flers penalised for fielding a suspended player. US Pecquencourt qualify for the second round. Original scoreline 6–3.)	US Pecquencourt (14)
292.	Les Épis Foot (13)	1–2	US Raimbeaucourt (11)
293.	Dechy Sports (13)	0–5	USCL Lewarde (14)
294.	FC Roost-Warendin (13)	3–3 (1–3 p)	AS Bersée (11)
295.	US Aubigny-au-Bac (16)	2–1	AJ Paix Waziers (16)
296.	US Frais Marais (14)	5–0	FC Monchecourt (15)
297.	RC Lécluse (14)	0–0 (4–3 p)	FC Férin (12)
298.	FC Nomain (16)	7–1	FC Écaillon (16)
299.	ESM Hamel (14)	0–3 (Note: ESM Hamel penalised for fielding a suspended player. FC Masny qualify for the second round. Original scoreline 0–1 (a.e.t.).)	FC Masny (11)
300.	FC Bruille-lez-Marchiennes (14)	1–5	SC Guesnain (10)
301.	FC Pecquencourt (15)	0–4	US Montigny-en-Ostrevent (12)
302.	AF Rieulay (15)	0–4	AS Coutiches (13)
303.	US Loffre-Erchin (14)	6–1	Olympique Marquette (13)
304.	US Auberchicourt (13)	4–0	US Corbehem (14)
305.	Olympic Marchiennois (14)	2–5	SC Aniche (10)
306.	UF Anhiers (12)	0–6	Stade Orchésien (9)
307.	FC Féchain (16)	1–4	AS Courchelettes (11)
308.	AJ Alcyaquoise (13)	1–2 (a.e.t.)	Olympique Flinois (12)
309.	SC Vicq (15)	0–4	Douchy FC (12)
310.	FC Famars (12)	4–0	ES Sebourg-Estreux (13)
311.	US Viesly (12)	0–3 (Note: US Viesly penalised for fielding a suspended player. AS Cuincy qualify for the second round. Original scoreline 2–1.)	AS Cuincy (11)
312.	US Lieu-St Amand (14)	0–3	FC Saultain (12)
313.	St Waast CFC (12)	6–2	US Briquette (11)
314.	RC Rœulx (16)	2–1	US Denaisienne (14)
315.	ES Bouchain (13)	4–2 (a.e.t.)	USM Beuvrages (11)
316.	US Haulchin (16)	1–7	JS Haveluy (13)
317.	ES Noyelloise (13)	2–2 (5–6 p)	Olympique Onnaingeois (10)
318.	AS Château-l'Abbaye (13)	2–0	AS Artres (15)
319.	AS Petite-Forêt (14)	0–9	FC Quarouble (9)
320.	US Hergnies (15)	1–2	Neuville OSC (14)
321.	AFC Escautpont (13)	2–3 (a.e.t.)	Bruay Sports (10)
322.	FC Lecelles-Rosult (12)	0–3 (Note: Match not played due to the field not being marked out at the scheduled time. FC Lecelles-Rosult penalised. Maing FC qualify for the second round.)	Maing FC (11)
323.	Haspres FC (15)	0–10	US Aulnoy (11)
324.	Olympique Millonfossois (15)	0–2	USM Marly (10)
325.	AS Curgies (13)	4–1	Vieux Condé (11)
326.	ES Mastaing FC (16)	0–4	CO Trith-St Léger (11)
327.	Stade Fresnois (10)	2–3 (a.e.t.)	EA Prouvy (12)
328.	ES Crespin (12)	2–6	Anzin FARC (11)
329.	St Saulve Foot (13)	0–3	JS Abscon (12)
330.	AS Wavrechain-sous-Denain (14)	2–1	AS Summer Club Valenciennes (11)
331.	AS Maisnières (13)	1–8	Amiens Picardie FC (13)
332.	US Marcelcave (14)	4–5	US Nibas Fressenneville (10)
333.	RC Salouël (9)	2–1	Conty Lœuilly SC (8)
334.	FC Mareuil-Caubert (10)	3–1	AS Talmas Picardie Fienvillers (11)
335.	AS Namps-Maisnil (13)	5–0	AS Woincourt Dargnies (13)
336.	US Daours Vecquemont Bussy Aubigny (11)	1–6	AAE Chaulnes (8)
337.	ASF Coudekerque (14)	1–2	ACS Hoymille (12)
338.	Olympique St Ouen (12)	3–0	FC Faubourg de Hem (none)
339.	SO Calais (12)	1–3	AL Camiers (10)
340.	US Sailly-Saillisel (10)	1–8	FC Porto Portugais Amiens (7)
341.	ASFR Ribemont Mericourt (12)	2–1	SC Flixecourt (10)
342.	US Le Crotoy (10)	3–1	JS Quevauvillers (8)
343.	CO Albert Sport (10)	0–3	Entente CAFC Péronne (8)
344.	ES Licourt (13)	4–1	AJ Argœuves (12)
345.	ASIC Bouttencourt (11)	4–0	FC Grand-Laviers (12)
346.	ES Roye-Damery (11)	1–4	US Ouvriere Albert (9)
347.	US Flesselles (11)	3–1	AC Hallencourt (11)
348.	CS Amiens Montières Étouvie (8)	4–2	AS St Sauveur (Somme) (9)
349.	AS Davenescourt (12)	2–0	USC Moislains (13)
350.	US Moyenneville (13)	1–11	US Abbeville (9)
351.	Fraternelle Ailly-sur-Noye (12)	0–5	Olympique Le Hamel (10)
352.	AF Amiens (15)	3–0	Union Amiens Sud-Est (12)
353.	JS Cambron (11)	1–4	AS Villers-Bretonneux (8)
354.	FC Ailly-Vauchelles (12)	7–3	US Le Boisle (12)
355.	FC Estrées-Mons (12)	2–5	ES Ste Emilie/Épehy le Ronss (11)
356.	Olympique Amiénois (11)	0–6	Montdidier AC (7)
357.	ASC Bourdon (13)	0–4	FC St Valéry Baie de Somme Sud (10)
358.	ES Sains/St Fuscien (10)	4–4 (7–6 p)	CO Woignarue (12)
359.	Avenir de l'Étoile (14)	1–7	US Corbie (10)
360.	ES Vers-sur-Selle (14)	2–4	ABC2F Candas (12)
361.	US Lignières-Châtelain (11)	2–5	RC Amiens (7)
362.	AC Mers (12)	0–1	SEP Blangy-Bouttencourt (10)
363.	US Voyennes (14)	2–4	FC Méaulte (10)
364.	US Esmery-Hallon (14)	1–6	US Ham (11)
365.	AS Vismes-au-Val (12)	0–4	Olympique Eaucourtois (11)
366.	Noyelles-sur-Mer FC (12)	0–12	AS Gamaches (7)
367.	US Cartigny-Buire (13)	2–2 (4–3 p)	AS Cerisy (11)
368.	SC Templiers Oisemont (10)	2–3	ES Harondel (9)
369.	AS Long (15)	2–8	FC Vignacourt (13)
370.	FC Oisemont (11)	1–2	RC Doullens (7)
371.	US Roisel (11)	0–6	ES Pigeonnier Amiens (9)
372.	US Hangest-en-Santerre (12)	1–1 (5–6 p)	FR Englebelmer (11)
373.	FC Blangy-Tronville (12)	3–0	ES Chépy (10)
374.	FC Dompierre-Becquincourt (13)	1–10	AS Querrieu (10)
375.	Association Longpre-Long Conde (12)	1–4 (a.e.t.)	Avenir Nouvion-en-Ponthieu (11)
376.	ES Cagny (11)	11–0	AS Menchecourt-Thuison-Bouvaque (10)
377.	AS Quesnoy-le-Montant (11)	2–4	AS Airaines-Allery (9)
378.	US Friville-Escarbotin (8)	1–0 (a.e.t.)	AS Valines (10)
379.	US Marchélepot (11)	0–1	US Rosières (9)
380.	AS Hautvillers-Ouville (13)	3–7	ES Deux Vallées (10)
381.	FC Arvillers (13)	3–2	US Méricourt l'Abbé (13)
382.	AAE Feuquières-en-Vimeu (12)	0–5	FC Saleux (8)
383.	Olympique Belloy-sur-Somme (13)	2–4 (a.e.t.)	US Béthencourt-sur-Mer (11)
384.	US Bouillancourt-en-Sery (12)	0–14	JS Miannay Lambercourt (9)
385.	Entente Sailly-Flibeaucourt Le Titre (12)	1–7	FC La Montoye (9)
386.	Auxiloise (9)	1–3	Amiens RIF (10)
387.	US Estaires (12)	3–2	FC Mons-en-Barœul (13)
388.	US Mardyck (13)	0–4	Fort-Mardyck OC (11)
389.	CG Haubourdin (10)	0–3 (Note: CG Haubourdin penalised for fielding a suspended player. AS Bourgogne Tourcoing qualify for the second round. Original scoreline unknown.)	AS Bourgogne Tourcoing (12)
390.	US Leffrinckoucke (11)	1–0	JS Ghyveldoise (10)
391.	FC Nieppois (12)	3–2 (a.e.t.)	CS Gondecourt (12)
392.	Faches-Thumesnil FC (12)	3–1	FC Le Doulieu (11)
393.	USCC St Pol-sur-Mer (11)	2–1	US Bavinchove-Cassel (11)
394.	Football St Michel Quesnoy (12)	1–4	ASE Allennoise (12)
395.	Pont-Rommel Football Hazebrouck (14)	0–6	US Warhem (10)
396.	FC Craywick (13)	0–1	AS Rexpoëde (12)
397.	EAC Cysoing-Wannehain-Bourghelles (12)	2–1	FA Blanc Seau (12)
398.	ASC Virolois (13)	2–1	FC Linselles (10)
399.	US Fretin (11)	3–4 (a.e.t.)	FC Templemars-Vendeville (12)
400.	Entente Steenbecque-Morbecque (13)	3–2 (a.e.t.)	US Houplin-Ancoisne (13)
401.	US St André (10)	2–0	EC Anstaing-Chéreng-Tressin-Gruson (10)
402.	ES Boeschepe (12)	2–4	FC Berquinois (12)
403.	FC Bierne (11)	0–1 (a.e.t.)	SM Petite-Synthe (12)
404.	Colisée Vimaranense Roubaix (12)	3–0	AS Pont de Nieppe (13)
405.	AS Loos Oliveaux (14)	1–4	FC Wambrechies (11)
406.	ESC Illies-Aubers-Lorgies (10)	3–0	Toufflers AF (13)
407.	FC Hardifort (13)	1–3	FC Steene (11)
408.	OC Roubaisien (10)	5–1	Flers OS (11)
409.	ES Bambecquoise (13)	1–1 (5–4 p)	US Cappelle-la-Grand (11)
410.	US Godewaersvelde (14)	2–6	USF Armbouts-Cappel (11)
411.	ES Cappelle-Pont-à-Marcq (11)	1–2	FC Santes (9)
412.	ES Genech (11)	4–0	EC Camphin-en-Pévèle (12)
413.	EC Houplines (12)	0–1	ES Ennequin-Loos (9)
414.	ACS Comines (10)	2–1	Stella Lys (10)
415.	CO Quaëdypre (11)	3–2	AAJ Uxem (11)
416.	FC Forestois (12)	7–4	Stade Lezennois (11)
417.	ES Lille Louvière Pellevoisin (11)	2–2 (3–4 p)	Verlinghem Foot (11)
418.	USF Coudekerquois (10)	1–2	SC Grand-Fort-Philippe (9)
419.	Stade Ennevelin (13)	0–3	Union Halluinoise (9)
420.	OSM Lomme (11)	4–1	US Phalempin (12)
421.	FC St Folquin (13)	0–8	AS Steenvorde (9)
422.	US Bray-Dunes (12)	2–0	US Wallon-Cappel (12)
423.	USM Merville (14)	1–3	OSM Sequedin (10)
424.	FC Bauvin (12)	3–1	AS Vieux-Lille (12)
425.	ASC Hazebrouck (10)	3–0	AS Noordpeene-Zuytpeene (11)
426.	ES Frelinghein (12)	1–4	JS Wavrin-Don (11)
427.	UJS Cheminots Tourcoing (none)	4–2	AS St Jean-Baptiste Roubaix (13)
428.	US Ronchin (10)	9–5 (a.e.t.)	FC Wattignies (11)
429.	RC Spycker (12)	2–5	AS Albeck Grand-Synthe (10)
430.	ES Weppes (10)	0–2	FC Lambersart (10)
431.	US Fleurbaisienne (12)	5–4	FC Emmerin (12)
432.	FC Annœullin (10)	3–0	US Antillais Lille Métropole (12)
433.	AS Dockers Dunkerque (11)	4–0	US Téteghem (10)
434.	AS Usines Dunkerque (12)	2–6	RC Bergues (10)
435.	Prémesques FC (13)	1–4	CS Erquinghem-Lys (11)
436.	US Yser (11)	0–4	ES Wormhout (10)
437.	FC Rosendaël (11)	4–0	AJL Caëstre (12)
438.	Bac-Sailly Sports (13)	1–0	FC Sailly-lez-Lannoy (12)
439.	SR Lomme Délivrance (12)	0–9	US Wattrelos (9)
440.	FC Madeleinois (11)	5–1	FC La Chapelle-d'Armentières (12)
441.	US Wervicquoise (12)	0–2	CS Bousbecque (11)
442.	US Pérenchies (10)	2–3	Olympique Hémois (10)
443.	US Provin (11)	0–2	JS Steenwerck (11)
444.	AG Thumeries (13)	4–1	Wattrelos FC (11)
445.	Olympique Mérignies (13)	2–4	AS Baisieux Patro (10)
446.	US Ambleteuse (12)	0–4	FC Sangatte (12)
447.	JS Blangy-sur-Ternoise (14)	1–8	US St Quentin-Bléssy (11)

== Second round ==
These matches were played on 3 September 2017.

Second round results: Hauts-de-France

Tie no	Home team (tier)	Score	Away team (tier)
1.	ABC2F Candas (12)	1–2	US Corbie (10)
2.	CSO Athies-sous-Laon (11)	0–7	ICS Créçois (7)
3.	AS Gandelu (12)	0–8	Château Thierry-Étampes FC (7)
4.	ES Clacy-Mons (11)	0–2 (a.e.t.)	Gauchy-Grugies St Quentin FC (8)
5.	US Anizy-Pinon (12)	0–6	US Laon (7)
6.	AS Audigny (12)	0–5	US Ribemont Mezieres FC (8)
7.	US Brissy-Hamégicourt (12)	0–8	SAS Moy de l'Aisne (8)
8.	US Aulnois-sous-Laon (12)	0–3	FC Amigny-Rouy (8)
9.	FC Monceau Les Leups (10)	1–3	L'Arsenal Club Achery-Beautor-Charmes (8)
10.	US Coucy-lès-Eppes (11)	1–7	US Rozoy-sur-Serre (10)
11.	ESUS Buironfosse-La Capelle (10)	1–0	Harly Quentin (8)
12.	Olympique Arras (16)	4–2	CS Pernes (12)
13.	FC 3 Châteaux (10)	0–3	Stade Portugais St Quentin (10)
14.	Entente Crouy-Cuffies (11)	3–2 (a.e.t.)	UA Fère-en-Tardenois (9)
15.	US La Fère (11)	0–2	Tergnier FC (7)
16.	AFC Holnon-Fayet (9)	3–1	US Chauny (7)
17.	CS Blérancourt (12)	1–2	US Crépy Vivaise (9)
18.	TFC Neuve-Maison (10)	2–0	Le Nouvion AC (9)
19.	SC Origny-en-Thiérache (11)	1–0	US Vervins (10)
20.	ASA Presles (9)	0–2	FC Soissons (7)
21.	FC Vaux-Andigny (12)	1–3	RC Bohain (8)
22.	US Seboncourt (11)	1–3	US Buire-Hirson-Thiérache (7)
23.	US Sissonne (10)	1–1 (3–4 p)	US Bruyères-et-Montbérault (8)
24.	FC St Martin-Étreillers (12)	1–2	ES Montcornet (8)
25.	Union Sud Aisne FC (9)	3–1	FC Villers Cotterêts (9)
26.	US Venizel (10)	8–1	FJEP Coincy (11)
27.	OS Annequin (11)	1–2	Carabiniers Billy-Montigny (8)
28.	ES Viry-Noureuil (12)	1–2	CS Villeneuve St Germain (9)
29.	AS Berneville (15)	0–1	AJ Neuville (15)
30.	ACSF Vic-sur-Aisne (12)	1–1 (7–6 p)	US des Vallées (11)
31.	ES Valois Multien (7)	3–2 (a.e.t.)	Internationale Soissonnaise (8)
32.	ES Anzin-St Aubin (12)	0–1	JS Écourt-St Quentin (11)
33.	US Rivière (15)	2–6	US Croisilles (10)
34.	AS Neuilly-St Front (10)	1–2 (a.e.t.)	US Prémontré St Gobain (8)
35.	US St Maurice Loos-en-Gohelle (8)	3–0 (Note: OS Aire-sur-la-Lys penalised for fielding a suspended player. US St Maurice Loos-en-Gohelle qualify for the third round. Original scoreline was, coincidentally, 3–0.)	OS Aire-sur-la-Lys (7)
36.	AFCL Liebaut (10)	2–1	Espérance Calonne Liévin (11)
37.	ES Buissy-Baralle (15)	0–2 (a.e.t.)	SC Fouquières (13)
38.	Renaissance Estrée-Blanche (15)	2–3 (a.e.t.)	US Ablain (14)
39.	ASC Camblain-l'Abbé (13)	0–1	COS Marles-Lozinghem (10)
40.	FC Dynamo Carvin Fosse 4 (15)	2–3	SC Aubigny/Savy-Berlette Association (14)
41.	US Ruch Carvin (12)	3–0	ES Ste Catherine (11)
42.	AS Cauchy-à-la-Tour (14)	1–3	AAE Aix-Noulette (12)
43.	AAE Évin-Malmaison (12)	1–2	Calonne-Ricouart FC Cite 6 (9)
44.	US Hesdigneul (13)	1–6	SC St Nicolas-lez-Arras (9)
45.	US Gonnehem-Busnettes (10)	1–0	ES Bully-les-Mines (8)
46.	ES Haisnes (12)	0–1	US Monchy-au-Bois (12)
47.	AS Frévent (12)	2–0	US Billy-Berclau (9)
48.	US Ham-en-Artois (15)	3–2	US Maisnil (15)
49.	US Houdain (12)	3–0 (Note: Game was abandoned after 59 minutes. US Cheminots Avion subsequently penalised. US Houdain qualify for the third round.)	US Cheminots Avion (12)
50.	AO Hermies (12)	0–4	FC Bouvigny-Boyeffles (9)
51.	ESD Isbergues (9)	2–4	AG Grenay (10)
52.	US Izel-lès-Équerchin (15)	5–2	US Mondicourt (14)
53.	FC La Roupie-Isbergues (14)	4–3	FC Annay (14)
54.	FC Lillers (13)	1–2	ES Laventie (10)
55.	ES Labeuvrière (10)	2–4	US Biachoise (7)
56.	FC Hauts de Lens (15)	3–2	CS Habarcq (13)
57.	Olympique Liévin (11)	0–4	US Nœux-les-Mines (7)
58.	USO Lens (10)	3–1	US Lestrem (11)
59.	FC Montigny-en-Gohelle (10)	0–4	SC Pro Patria Wingles (9)
60.	ES St Laurent-Blangy (11)	0–5	CS Avion (7)
61.	US Noyelles-sous-Lens (9)	2–1	US Vermelles (7)
62.	AS Ste Barbe-Oignies (9)	4–1	US St Pol-sur-Ternoise (8)
63.	AS Noyelles-lés-Vermelles (14)	1–4 (a.e.t.)	AS Vallée de la Ternoise (14)
64.	US Pas-en-Artois (12)	2–6	CS Diana Liévin (11)
65.	AS Sailly-Labourse (12)	1–5	USO Drocourt (13)
66.	AJ Ruitz (15)	1–7	AS Brebières (13)
67.	FC Servins (14)	0–4	FC Hinges (13)
68.	ES Vendin (12)	0–1	USO Bruay-la-Buissière (9)
69.	AS Violaines (12)	1–2	US Courcelles (13)
70.	USCL Lewarde (14)	0–3	RC Labourse (11)
71.	Gouy-St André RC (14)	0–5	Olympique Hesdin-Marconne (9)
72.	US Quiestède (10)	1–3	AS Audruicq (9)
73.	FC Fréthun (14)	0–2	RC Ardrésien (11)
74.	US Verchocq-Ergny-Herly (13)	0–1	AS Berck (9)
75.	CF Hemmes de Marck (14)	3–5	Calais RUFC (9)
76.	Amicale Balzac (12)	1–10	FC Campagne-lès-Guines (10)
77.	FC Senlecques (13)	0–7	US Nielles-lès-Bléquin (10)
78.	US Bourthes (11)	0–2	AS Outreau (7)
79.	AS Bezinghem (12)	0–1	US Attin (10)
80.	FC Nordausques (11)	0–1 (a.e.t.)	US St Quentin-Bléssy (11)
81.	JS Desvroise (9)	1–0	CA Éperlecques (11)
82.	AL Camiers (10)	1–0	US Montreuil (9)
83.	Calais Beau-Marais (10)	1–0	ES Calaisis Coulogne (9)
84.	US Bomy (15)	1–2	CS Watten (11)
85.	ASL Vieil-Moutier La Calique (12)	0–4	JS Longuenesse (7)
86.	US Marais de Gûines (11)	6–2 (a.e.t.)	FC Conti (11)
87.	US Attaquoise (12)	0–7	Amicale Pascal Calais (7)
88.	FC Sangatte (12)	2–1	Olympique St Martin Boulogne (9)
89.	AS Rang-du-Fliers (13)	0–1	ESL Boulogne-sur-Mer (11)
90.	USO Rinxent (10)	0–2	ACO Aiglon (9)
91.	Union St Loupoise (13)	1–4	AF Étaples Haute Ville (11)
92.	US Marquise (10)	0–1	ES Oye-Plage (10)
93.	RC Offekerque (13)	0–3	US Blériot-Plage (9)
94.	US Équihen-Plage (11)	0–6	CO Wimille (10)
95.	Longuenesse Malafoot (12)	2–0	US Thérouanne (13)
96.	Éclair Neufchâtel-Hardelot (11)	1–2	US Hesdin-l'Abbé (11)
97.	FC La Capelle (12)	2–1	FC Calais Catena (12)
98.	AS Nortkerque 95 (10)	2–1	FC Wardrecques (11)
99.	FC Wavrans-sur-l'Aa (11)	0–4	ES Enquin-les-Mines (9)
100.	AS Conchil-le-Temple (12)	0–3	AS Étaples (8)
101.	ES Beaurainville (11)	5–1	AS Fillièvres (12)
102.	AS Fruges (13)	1–2	RC Samer (10)
103.	US Bonningues-lès-Calais (14)	1–3	CAP Le Portel (11)
104.	AS Maresquel (13)	2–6	AS Campagne-lès-Hesdin (11)
105.	JS Racquinghem (13)	0–8	Recques FC (9)
106.	ES St Léonard (10)	1–4	SC Coquelles (9)
107.	FLC Longfossé (11)	1–3	FC Tatinghem (8)
108.	AS Hallines (11)	3–0	ES Roquetoire (12)
109.	Amicale Pont-de-Briques (13)	2–0	AS St Tricat/Nielles (13)
110.	USAC Somain (10)	2–0	SC Douai (7)
111.	US Aubigny-au-Bac (16)	1–4	FC Masny (11)
112.	RC Lécluse (14)	2–3	SC Aniche (10)
113.	ES Guînes (9)	0–0 (4–5 p)	ES Arques (8)
114.	FC Nomain (16)	0–6	US Raimbeaucourt (11)
115.	US Frais Marais (14)	0–10	US Mineurs Waziers (7)
116.	SC Guesnain (10)	2–1	Olympique Senséen (8)
117.	US Montigny-en-Ostrevent (12)	2–1	AS Courchelettes (11)
118.	US Loffre-Erchin (14)	0–5	ES Lambresienne (8)
119.	AS Douai-Lambres Cheminots (13)	1–3	AS Sin-le-Noble (9)
120.	AS Coutiches (13)	1–5	US Auberchicourt (13)
121.	US Erre-Hornaing (11)	0–0 (2–0 p)	Stade Orchésien (9)
122.	Olympique Flinois (12)	2–3	AEF Leforest (9)
123.	RC Rœulx (16)	0–8	Bruay Sports (10)
124.	AS Château-l'Abbaye (13)	1–2	JS Abscon (12)
125.	St Waast CFC (12)	2–3	Olympique Onnaingeois (10)
126.	CO Trith-St Léger (11)	1–5	JO Wallers-Arenberg (11)
127.	Anzin FARC (11)	3–2	Maing FC (11)
128.	FC Famars (12)	1–5	IC La Sentinelle (8)
129.	FC Saultain (12)	1–0	AS Curgies (13)
130.	Neuville OSC (14)	0–12	FC Raismes (8)
131.	AS Wavrechain-sous-Denain (14)	0–9	US Escaudain (8)
132.	Douchy FC (12)	2–2 (3–2 p)	US Aulnoy (11)
133.	USM Marly (10)	0–3 (Note: Game was abandoned after 118 minutes. USM Marly subsequently penalised. FC Quarouble qualify for the third round.)	FC Quarouble (9)
134.	EA Prouvy (12)	1–4	Dutemple FC Valenciennes (7)
135.	JS Haveluy (13)	1–3	US Hordain (9)
136.	FC St Hilaire-sur-Helpe (14)	1–3	FC Marpent (10)
137.	US Cousolre (11)	4–2	IC Ferrière-la-Grande (12)
138.	US Beaufort/Limont-Fontaine (13)	0–4	US Bavay (10)
139.	US Jeumont (11)	6–2	OSC Assevent (12)
140.	SCEPS Pont-sur-Sambre (14)	1–2	US Fourmies (9)
141.	US Villers-Pol (14)	0–5	FC Avesnes-sur-Helpe (9)
142.	Sports Podéens Réunis (11)	5–0	Olympique Maroilles (12)
143.	US Englefontaine (16)	1–0	SA Le Quesnoy (13)
144.	US Villersoise (14)	3–7	ES Boussois (12)
145.	SC Bachant (13)	1–2	US Berlaimont (11)
146.	Red Star Jeumont (15)	2–1	AS Bellignies (11)
147.	AS Hautmont (8)	0–0 (5–6 p)	ASG Louvroil (9)
148.	AS Bourlon (13)	2–9	US St Aubert (11)
149.	US Rousies (13)	1–4	AS Douzies (9)
150.	US Busigny (13)	3–2	US Walincourt-Selvigny (12)
151.	OC Avesnois (13)	0–3	FC Neuville-St Rémy (11)
152.	AS Montay (15)	0–5	OM Cambrai Amérique (11)
153.	AS Lesdain (16)	1–7	CAS Escaudœuvres (7)
154.	US Les Rues-des-Vignes (15)	0–6	US St Souplet (13)
155.	FC Saulzoir (12)	0–3	US Élincourt (11)
156.	Entente Ligny/Olympique Caullery (14)	2–2 (3–1 p)	FC Provillois (11)
157.	US Bray-Dunes (12)	0–2	RC Bergues (10)
158.	ES Bouchain (13)	0–2	ES Caudry (9)
159.	US Ors (14)	0–8	ES Villers-Outréaux (9)
160.	FC Pommereuil (15)	0–4	FC Iwuy (14)
161.	UJS Cheminots Tourcoing (none)	4–3 (a.e.t.)	USF Armbouts-Cappel (11)
162.	ES Bambecquoise (13)	3–1	Entente Steenbecque-Morbecque (13)
163.	ES Genech (11)	2–0	Union Halluinoise (9)
164.	FC Madeleinois (11)	0–1	US Portugais Roubaix Tourcoing (8)
165.	US Estaires (12)	1–9	US Wattrelos (9)
166.	CO Quaëdypre (11)	1–3	FC Templemars-Vendeville (12)
167.	Colisée Vimaranense Roubaix (12)	0–3	OS Fives (7)
168.	EAC Cysoing-Wannehain-Bourghelles (12)	1–2	ACS Hoymille (12)
169.	CS La Gorgue (8)	4–2	Villeneuve-d'Ascq Métropole (7)
170.	AS Dockers Dunkerque (11)	5–2	Fort-Mardyck OC (11)
171.	AS Dunkerque Sud (9)	1–2	AS Steenvorde (9)
172.	FC Steene (11)	0–3	FA Neuvilloise (7)
173.	USCC St Pol-sur-Mer (11)	1–4	Roubaix SC (7)
174.	SM Petite-Synthe (12)	1–0	IC Lambersart (9)
175.	FC Deûlémont (12)	0–0 (1–3 p)	ESC Illies-Aubers-Lorgies (10)
176.	CS Bousbecque (11)	1–3	US Esquelbecq (8)
177.	AS Bersée (11)	0–2	FC Lambersart (10)
178.	Faches-Thumesnil FC (12)	1–0	AG Thumeries (13)
179.	US St André (10)	2–1	FC Lille Sud (7)
180.	FC Nieppois (12)	1–9	ES Wormhout (10)
181.	FC Seclin (7)	1–2	FC Bondues (8)
182.	AS Rexpoëde (12)	0–7	US Arnèke (8)
183.	Olympique Hémois (10)	0–2	US Marquette (8)
184.	US Leffrinckoucke (11)	0–3	ES Mouvalloise (8)
185.	Bac-Sailly Sports (13)	0–1	FC Annœullin (10)
186.	FC Wambrechies (11)	1–2	US Ronchin (10)
187.	JS Steenwerck (11)	1–1 (0–3 p)	ES Ennequin-Loos (9)
188.	US Warhem (10)	2–1	Leers OF (9)
189.	Verlinghem Foot (11)	3–0	SC Grand-Fort-Philippe (9)
190.	AS Templeuve-en-Pévèle (9)	1–0	SCO Roubaix (8)
191.	AS Baisieux Patro (10)	1–2	JA Armentières (8)
192.	FC Rosendaël (11)	0–3	US Ascq (8)
193.	AO Sainghinoise (9)	2–1	US Lille Moulins Carrel (8)
194.	ASC Virolois (13)	2–3	SC Bailleulois (9)
195.	AS Bourgogne Tourcoing (12)	0–1	AS Hellemmes (9)
196.	ES Roncq (9)	5–3	OSM Sequedin (10)
197.	FC Forestois (12)	2–3	CS Erquinghem-Lys (11)
198.	FC Berquinois (12)	1–9	US Lesquin (7)
199.	AS Albeck Grand-Synthe (10)	3–4	ACS Comines (10)
200.	FC Bauvin (12)	0–4	SC Bourbourg (10)
201.	AS Davenescourt (12)	0–3	CS Amiens Montières Étouvie (8)
202.	FC Santes (9)	2–1 (a.e.t.)	US Gravelines (7)
203.	OC Roubaisien (10)	0–2	JS Lille Wazemmes (9)
204.	US Pont Ste-Maxence (7)	5–0	USE St Leu d'Esserent (8)
205.	OSM Lomme (11)	5–3	Mons AC (9)
206.	AS Silly-le-Long (10)	1–2 (a.e.t.)	AFC Creil (7)
207.	AS Laigneville (11)	1–5	FC Béthisy (8)
208.	ES Remy (12)	1–2	Stade Ressontois (10)
209.	FC Salency (13)	0–7	US Gouvieux (9)
210.	AS Verneuil-en-Halatte (10)	2–2 (4–3 p)	AS Orry-La-Chapelle (10)
211.	US Baugy-Monchy Humières (11)	1–2 (a.e.t.)	US Plessis-Brion (11)
212.	US Attichy (14)	1–3	AS Tracy-le-Mont (11)
213.	ASC Val d'Automne (11)	1–2	US Margny-lès-Compiègne (9)
214.	ES Ormoy-Duvy (12)	1–4	US Lamorlaye (9)
215.	AS Multien (12)	6–2	FC Angy (10)
216.	US Ribécourt (9)	3–0	JSA Compiègne-La Croix-St Ouen (9)
217.	US Pierrefonds (13)	0–2	AS St Sauveur (Oise) (9)
218.	CA Venette (11)	3–0	FC La Neuville-Roy (12)
219.	FC Muirancourt (11)	8–1	US Breuil-le-Sec (11)
220.	US St Maximin (8)	1–3	US Breteuil (7)
221.	CS Haudivillers (10)	0–3	US Estrées-St Denis (9)
222.	RC Blargies (13)	5–4 (a.e.t.)	US Marseille-en-Beauvaisis (10)
223.	SC Songeons (9)	3–2	FC Esches-Fosseuse (10)
224.	AS Hénonville (13)	3–2	SCC Sérifontaine (11)
225.	AS La Neuville-sur-Oudeuil (11)	2–1	FC Nointel (9)
226.	Canly FC (11)	0–4	CS Chaumont-en-Vexin (7)
227.	US Fouquenies (9)	0–3	US Étouy (7)
228.	FC Fontainettes St Aubin (12)	0–4	CO Beauvais (9)
229.	FC Jouy-sous-Thelle (12)	1–6	AS Allonne (8)
230.	US Froissy (11)	2–2 (4–2 p)	ASPTT Beauvais (11)
231.	Grandvilliers AC (10)	0–2	SC St Just-en-Chaussée (7)
232.	AS Noyers-Saint-Martin (12)	0–0 (2–4 p)	AS Auneuil (10)
233.	JS Thieux (12)	1–4	US Crèvecœur-le-Grand (10)
234.	AS Noailles-Cauvigny (11)	2–1	AJ Laboissière-en-Thelle (10)
235.	AS Namps-Maisnil (13)	0–5	RC Salouël (9)
236.	Tricot OS (11)	0–0 (5–4 p)	AS Verderel-lès-Sauqueuse (12)
237.	Amiens Picardie FC (13)	3–4	US Nibas Fressenneville (10)
238.	SC Pont Remy (11)	3–1	FC Mareuil-Caubert (10)
239.	Olympique St Ouen (12)	2–3	ES Harondel (9)
240.	FC St Valéry Baie de Somme Sud (10)	1–3	ES Sains/St Fuscien (10)
241.	AS Glisy (12)	1–0 (a.e.t.)	AAE Chaulnes (8)
242.	US Le Crotoy (10)	1–5	FC Porto Portugais Amiens (7)
243.	ASFR Ribemont Mericourt (12)	0–3	Entente CAFC Péronne (8)
244.	ES Licourt (13)	1–4	US Ouvriere Albert (9)
245.	US Flesselles (11)	2–1	ASIC Bouttencourt (11)
246.	Olympique Le Hamel (10)	2–4 (a.e.t.)	US Abbeville (9)
247.	AF Amiens (15)	2–4	AS Villers-Bretonneux (8)
248.	FC Ailly-Vauchelles (12)	1–10	FC Centuloise (8)
249.	ES Ste Emilie/Épehy le Ronss (11)	1–6	Montdidier AC (7)
250.	FC Méaulte (10)	4–3	RC Amiens (7)
251.	US Béthencourt-sur-Mer (11)	0–4	FC La Montoye (9)
252.	US Cartigny-Buire (13)	1–3	US Ham (11)
253.	SEP Blangy-Bouttencourt (10)	1–0	Olympique Eaucourtois (11)
254.	ES Pigeonnier Amiens (9)	1–3	AS Gamaches (7)
255.	FC Vignacourt (13)	1–3	RC Doullens (7)
256.	AS Querrieu (10)	3–1	FR Englebelmer (11)
257.	Avenir Nouvion-en-Ponthieu (11)	3–2	FC Blangy-Tronville (12)
258.	ES Cagny (11)	4–5	AS Airaines-Allery (9)
259.	US Rosières (9)	3–2	US Friville-Escarbotin (8)
260.	FC Arvillers (13)	3–0	ES Deux Vallées (10)
261.	JS Miannay Lambercourt (9)	3–1	FC Saleux (8)
262.	Amiens RIF (10)	2–2 (2–4 p)	SC Moreuil (10)
263.	US Pecquencourt (14)	0–4	AS Beuvry-la-Forêt (9)
264.	US Fleurbaisienne (12)	1–2	ASC Hazebrouck (10)
265.	US Bertry-Clary (14)	3–2	AS Cuincy (11)
266.	ASE Allennoise (12)	1–0	JS Wavrin-Don (11)

== Third round ==
These matches were played on 10 and 17 September 2017.

Third round results: Hauts-de-France

Tie no	Home team (tier)	Score	Away team (tier)
1.	AS Gamaches (7)	2–1 (a.e.t.)	FC Ailly-sur-Somme Samara (5)
2.	US Abbeville (9)	1–3	US Nibas Fressenneville (10)
3.	US Crèvecœur-le-Grand (10)	0–9	SC Abbeville (6)
4.	FC Centuloise (8)	2–3 (a.e.t.)	FC Porto Portugais Amiens (7)
5.	Avenir Nouvion-en-Ponthieu (11)	1–5	US Breteuil (7)
6.	CS Chaumont-en-Vexin (7)	5–2	US Camon (6)
7.	US Lamorlaye (9)	2–2 (9–10 p)	CO Beauvais (9)
8.	SC Pont Remy (11)	0–6	ESC Longueau (6)
9.	AS Airaines-Allery (9)	2–2 (4–5 p)	US Gouvieux (9)
10.	ES Harondel (9)	4–1	AS Auneuil (10)
11.	RC Blargies (13)	0–6	SC Songeons (9)
12.	JS Miannay Lambercourt (9)	9–1	SEP Blangy-Bouttencourt (10)
13.	US Nielles-lès-Bléquin (10)	0–2	CS Avion (7)
14.	US Flesselles (11)	1–3	FC Béthisy (8)
15.	US Étouy (7)	1–3	AFC Compiègne (6)
16.	AS Noailles-Cauvigny (11)	0–6	Château Thierry-Étampes FC (7)
17.	ES Sains/St Fuscien (10)	1–0	AS Querrieu (10)
18.	ACSF Vic-sur-Aisne (12)	1–6	FC La Montoye (9)
19.	US Froissy (11)	0–3	US Roye-Noyon (5)
20.	AS Glisy (12)	2–1	L'Arsenal Club Achery-Beautor-Charmes (8)
21.	CS Villeneuve St Germain (9)	1–2 (a.e.t.)	US Chantilly (6)
22.	Union Sud Aisne FC (9)	4–2	US Chevrières-Grandfresnoy (6)
23.	US Prémontré St Gobain (8)	1–4	FC Soissons (7)
24.	RC Salouël (9)	1–2	FC Amigny-Rouy (8)
25.	US Venizel (10)	3–9	Tergnier FC (7)
26.	AS Verneuil-en-Halatte (10)	3–0	US Ribécourt (9)
27.	US Plessis-Brion (11)	2–5	Entente CAFC Péronne (8)
28.	Tricot OS (11)	2–2 (2–4 p)	Stade Ressontois (10)
29.	Stade Portugais St Quentin (10)	0–2	US Choisy-au-Bac (6)
30.	Gauchy-Grugies St Quentin FC (8)	1–0	Standard FC Montataire (6)
31.	ES Valois Multien (7)	0–0 (2–4 p)	US Pont Ste-Maxence (7)
32.	CA Venette (11)	1–0	AFC Holnon-Fayet (9)
33.	Entente Crouy-Cuffies (11)	0–4	AFC Creil (7)
34.	US Estrées-St Denis (9)	0–0 (4–3 p)	SC St Just-en-Chaussée (7)
35.	AS Villers-Bretonneux (8)	2–3	US Margny-lès-Compiègne (9)
36.	AS La Neuville-sur-Oudeuil (11)	2–4	US Crépy Vivaise (9)
37.	US Balagny-St Epin (6)	0–1	USM Senlisienne (5)
38.	ES Oye-Plage (10)	3–2	US Marais de Gûines (11)
39.	TFC Neuve-Maison (10)	1–4	ICS Créçois (7)
40.	AS Multien (12)	3–1 (a.e.t.)	RC Bohain (8)
41.	AS Vallée de la Ternoise (14)	1–7	AS Nortkerque 95 (10)
42.	US Rozoy-sur-Serre (10)	3–2	SAS Moy de l'Aisne (8)
43.	ES Montcornet (8)	0–1	Entente Itancourt-Neuville (6)
44.	US Ham (11)	5–1	ESUS Buironfosse-La Capelle (10)
45.	US Rosières (9)	1–3	US Buire-Hirson-Thiérache (7)
46.	US Corbie (10)	2–0	SC Origny-en-Thiérache (11)
47.	FC Arvillers (13)	1–4	US Bruyères-et-Montbérault (8)
48.	RC Samer (10)	2–1	AS Campagne-lès-Hesdin (11)
49.	SC Moreuil (10)	4–1	FC Muirancourt (11)
50.	US Ribemont Mezieres FC (8)	1–1 (3–1 p)	AS du Pays Neslois (6)
51.	AS Tracy-le-Mont (11)	1–6	US Ouvriere Albert (9)
52.	US Laon (7)	0–2	Olympique Saint-Quentin (5)
53.	AS St Sauveur (Oise) (9)	3–1	US Guignicourt (7)
54.	SM Petite-Synthe (12)	0–10	Olympique Grande-Synthe (5)
55.	US Monchy-au-Bois (12)	2–1	RC Ardrésien (11)
56.	Amicale Pont-de-Briques (13)	0–2	FC La Capelle (12)
57.	FC Méaulte (10)	1–2	Montdidier AC (7)
58.	ES Arques (8)	0–4	Le Touquet AC (6)
59.	US Attin (10)	2–7	CS La Gorgue (8)
60.	AS Dockers Dunkerque (11)	2–3 (a.e.t.)	AL Camiers (10)
61.	ES Beaurainville (11)	0–2	AS Audruicq (9)
62.	SC Coquelles (9)	3–2 (a.e.t.)	AS Outreau (7)
63.	US Blériot-Plage (9)	1–2	JS Longuenesse (7)
64.	AF Étaples Haute Ville (11)	0–1	AS Étaples (8)
65.	Calais RUFC (9)	0–4	AS Berck (9)
66.	ACS Hoymille (12)	0–6	AS Marck (6)
67.	Longuenesse Malafoot (12)	0–1	US St Quentin-Bléssy (11)
68.	CO Wimille (10)	1–4	Olympique Hesdin-Marconne (9)
69.	SC Bailleulois (9)	0–1	AO Sainghinoise (9)
70.	CS Watten (11)	1–5	AS Steenvorde (9)
71.	FC Sangatte (12)	5–0	AS Hallines (11)
72.	FC La Roupie-Isbergues (14)	0–2	FC Campagne-lès-Guines (10)
73.	JS Desvroise (9)	2–5	US Tourcoing FC (5)
74.	FC Masny (11)	2–2 (1–3 p)	Verlinghem Foot (11)
75.	ES Bambecquoise (13)	1–4	US Warhem (10)
76.	FC Santes (9)	0–0 (5–4 p)	Amicale Pascal Calais (7)
77.	FC Tatinghem (8)	0–1	US Saint-Omer (6)
78.	CAP Le Portel (11)	1–2	Calais Beau-Marais (10)
79.	UJS Cheminots Tourcoing (none)	2–3 (a.e.t.)	ACO Aiglon (9)
80.	Recques FC (9)	0–4	US Esquelbecq (8)
81.	US Hesdin-l'Abbé (11)	0–10	Olympique Lumbrois (6)
82.	ESL Boulogne-sur-Mer (11)	1–2	US Noyelles-sous-Lens (9)
83.	AS Frévent (12)	1–2	ES Mouvalloise (8)
84.	RC Labourse (11)	4–1	Calonne-Ricouart FC Cite 6 (9)
85.	US Ham-en-Artois (15)	0–5	Stade Portelois (6)
86.	FC Hinges (13)	2–1	ES Wormhout (10)
87.	RC Bergues (10)	0–1	OS Fives (7)
88.	CS Erquinghem-Lys (11)	0–3	US Biachoise (7)
89.	SC Fouquières (13)	3–1	US Ruch Carvin (12)
90.	AAE Aix-Noulette (12)	1–3	USO Drocourt (13)
91.	OSM Lomme (11)	2–1	ES Roncq (9)
92.	CS Diana Liévin (11)	3–0	ES Enquin-les-Mines (9)
93.	SC Bourbourg (10)	2–3 (a.e.t.)	FA Neuvilloise (7)
94.	Carabiniers Billy-Montigny (8)	3–1 (a.e.t.)	AS Ste Barbe-Oignies (9)
95.	US Courcelles (13)	6–0 (a.e.t.)	US Gonnehem-Busnettes (10)
96.	US Arnèke (8)	1–2	USO Bruay-la-Buissière (9)
97.	FC Dunkerque-Malo Plage (6)	0–1	Wasquehal Football (5)
98.	ES Laventie (10)	2–1 (a.e.t.)	ASC Hazebrouck (10)
99.	US St Maurice Loos-en-Gohelle (8)	2–0	FC Bouvigny-Boyeffles (9)
100.	US Hordain (9)	0–1	US Marquette (8)
101.	SC Aniche (10)	0–0 (1–4 p)	FC Annœullin (10)
102.	ES Genech (11)	2–1 (a.e.t.)	AFCL Liebaut (10)
103.	US Cousolre (11)	2–0	ES Ennequin-Loos (9)
104.	SC Aubigny/Savy-Berlette Association (14)	4–2	FC Hauts de Lens (15)
105.	COS Marles-Lozinghem (10)	2–3	JA Armentières (8)
106.	US Raimbeaucourt (11)	2–3	AS Hellemmes (9)
107.	US Montigny-en-Ostrevent (12)	2–8	US Vimy (6)
108.	ASE Allennoise (12)	2–2 (2–3 p)	Roubaix SC (7)
109.	US Ablain (14)	1–4	FC Templemars-Vendeville (12)
110.	AG Grenay (10)	2–1	US Erre-Hornaing (11)
111.	AS Hénonville (13)	0–9	AS Allonne (8)
112.	JS Lille Wazemmes (9)	2–0	US Lesquin (7)
113.	FC Iwuy (14)	1–3	FC Lambersart (10)
114.	FC Bondues (8)	1–0	AEF Leforest (9)
115.	Saint-Amand FC (5)	2–1	FC Loon-Plage (6)
116.	US St Souplet (13)	0–3	US Ascq (8)
117.	US Bertry-Clary (14)	0–10	US Maubeuge (5)
118.	US Ronchin (10)	0–0 (2–4 p)	SC Guesnain (10)
119.	ASG Louvroil (9)	1–2 (a.e.t.)	ES Caudry (9)
120.	Faches-Thumesnil FC (12)	0–4	FC Marpent (10)
121.	AJ Neuville (15)	0–1	US Jeumont (11)
122.	SC Pro Patria Wingles (9)	1–4	IC La Sentinelle (8)
123.	US Izel-lès-Équerchin (15)	0–3	Dutemple FC Valenciennes (7)
124.	JS Écourt-St Quentin (11)	3–1	AS Templeuve-en-Pévèle (9)
125.	US Portugais Roubaix Tourcoing (8)	2–3 (a.e.t.)	SC St Nicolas-lez-Arras (9)
126.	Entente Ligny/Olympique Caullery (14)	1–2	AS Sin-le-Noble (9)
127.	US Bavay (10)	2–1	US St Aubert (11)
128.	ES Boussois (12)	4–1	CAS Escaudœuvres (7)
129.	US Croisilles (10)	0–1	SC Hazebrouck (6)
130.	US Élincourt (11)	1–2 (a.e.t.)	US Wattrelos (9)
131.	US Berlaimont (11)	1–3	AC Cambrai (6)
132.	US Englefontaine (16)	2–1	FC Raismes (8)
133.	Douchy FC (12)	0–1	FC Avesnes-sur-Helpe (9)
134.	US Fourmies (9)	1–2	US Escaudain (8)
135.	ES Villers-Outréaux (9)	4–0	ACS Comines (10)
136.	Sports Podéens Réunis (11)	4–2	USO Lens (10)
137.	US Busigny (13)	0–23	US Nœux-les-Mines (7)
138.	JS Abscon (12)	3–1	Bruay Sports (10)
139.	US Auberchicourt (13)	1–3	Olympique Marcquois (6)
140.	US Mineurs Waziers (7)	2–3 (a.e.t.)	Feignies Aulnoye FC (5)
141.	Red Star Jeumont (15)	2–4	JO Wallers-Arenberg (11)
142.	FC Saultain (12)	1–3	US St André (10)
143.	Olympique Onnaingeois (10)	2–1	ESC Illies-Aubers-Lorgies (10)
144.	AS Brebières (13)	0–1	Stade Béthunois (6)
145.	USAC Somain (10)	3–4 (a.e.t.)	Anzin FARC (11)
146.	Olympique Arras (16)	1–0	FC Neuville-St Rémy (11)
147.	ES Lambresienne (8)	4–1	AS Beuvry-la-Forêt (9)
148.	CS Amiens Montières Étouvie (8)	3–1	RC Doullens (7)
149.	FC Quarouble (9)	2–1	AS Douzies (9)
150.	OM Cambrai Amérique (11)	4–1	US Houdain (12)

== Fourth round ==
These matches were played on 22, 23 and 24 September 2017.

Fourth round results: Hauts-de-France

Tie no	Home team (tier)	Score	Away team (tier)
1.	US Roye-Noyon (5)	2–0	Olympique Saint-Quentin (5)
2.	US Margny-lès-Compiègne (9)	1–3	AS Beauvais Oise (4)
3.	JS Miannay Lambercourt (9)	0–0 (4–1 p)	SC Abbeville (6)
4.	Stade Béthunois (6)	2–1	Le Touquet AC (6)
5.	Entente CAFC Péronne (8)	2–3	US Buire-Hirson-Thiérache (7)
6.	JA Armentières (8)	0–1	US Saint-Omer (6)
7.	SC Songeons (9)	3–4	FC Porto Portugais Amiens (7)
8.	CO Beauvais (9)	0–8	AC Amiens (4)
9.	AS Allonne (8)	1–1 (2–4 p)	ES Harondel (9)
10.	ESC Longueau (6)	4–0	CS Chaumont-en-Vexin (7)
11.	FC La Montoye (9)	1–2 (a.e.t.)	AS St Sauveur (Oise) (9)
12.	AS Glisy (12)	4–0	US Nibas Fressenneville (10)
13.	AS Verneuil-en-Halatte (10)	0–0 (3–4 p)	CS Amiens Montières Étouvie (8)
14.	US Breteuil (7)	1–3 (a.e.t.)	AS Gamaches (7)
15.	Union Sud Aisne FC (9)	2–3	USM Senlisienne (5)
16.	FC Béthisy (8)	1–2	AFC Compiègne (6)
17.	ES Sains/St Fuscien (10)	2–2 (2–4 p)	FC Soissons (7)
18.	SC Moreuil (10)	3–1	FC Amigny-Rouy (8)
19.	US Corbie (10)	0–1	Château Thierry-Étampes FC (7)
20.	US Crépy Vivaise (9)	6–0	US Rozoy-sur-Serre (10)
21.	US Ouvriere Albert (9)	4–3 (a.e.t.)	US Gouvieux (9)
22.	US Chantilly (6)	3–1	US Pont Ste-Maxence (7)
23.	US Estrées-St Denis (9)	0–1	AFC Creil (7)
24.	AL Camiers (10)	0–3	SC Hazebrouck (6)
25.	Stade Ressontois (10)	0–3	US Ribemont Mezieres FC (8)
26.	Entente Itancourt-Neuville (6)	3–1	ICS Créçois (7)
27.	CA Venette (11)	0–1	US Choisy-au-Bac (6)
28.	ES Oye-Plage (10)	2–4	US Nœux-les-Mines (7)
29.	Olympique Hesdin-Marconne (9)	0–1	AO Sainghinoise (9)
30.	AS Marck (6)	3–1	JS Longuenesse (7)
31.	RC Samer (10)	0–1	RC Labourse (11)
32.	Montdidier AC (7)	2–0	Gauchy-Grugies St Quentin FC (8)
33.	FC La Capelle (12)	1–8	Stade Portelois (6)
34.	JS Écourt-St Quentin (11)	4–0 (Note: Game was abandoned after 56 minutes due to FC Sangatte having insufficient players to continue. FC Sangatte penalised. JS Écourt-St Quentin qualify for the fifth round.)	FC Sangatte (12)
35.	AS Multien (12)	1–0	US Bruyères-et-Montbérault (8)
36.	US Biachoise (7)	1–3	Olympique Grande-Synthe (5)
37.	AS Berck (9)	2–1 (a.e.t.)	CS La Gorgue (8)
38.	AS Étaples (8)	0–0 (4–5 p)	US Wattrelos (9)
39.	US Esquelbecq (8)	0–1	US St Maurice Loos-en-Gohelle (8)
40.	SC Aubigny/Savy-Berlette Association (14)	0–17	SC Coquelles (9)
41.	AS Steenvorde (9)	0–1	US Tourcoing FC (5)
42.	US Vimy (6)	1–0	Wasquehal Football (5)
43.	SC Fouquières (13)	1–2	FC Campagne-lès-Guines (10)
44.	AS Audruicq (9)	0–2	Saint-Amand FC (5)
45.	FC Hinges (13)	1–2	JS Lille Wazemmes (9)
46.	AS Nortkerque 95 (10)	3–0	OSM Lomme (11)
47.	OM Cambrai Amérique (11)	0–1	CS Diana Liévin (11)
48.	US Noyelles-sous-Lens (9)	2–1	US Warhem (10)
49.	ES Genech (11)	1–6	Arras FA (4)
50.	FC Templemars-Vendeville (12)	0–4	Roubaix SC (7)
51.	US St André (10)	2–1 (a.e.t.)	USO Bruay-la-Buissière (9)
52.	US Courcelles (13)	0–2	Olympique Marcquois (6)
53.	Anzin FARC (11)	2–7	AS Hellemmes (9)
54.	Olympique Onnaingeois (10)	1–3	ES Caudry (9)
55.	CS Avion (7)	4–2	US Maubeuge (5)
56.	SC St Nicolas-lez-Arras (9)	0–1	OS Fives (7)
57.	Olympique Arras (16)	2–0	USO Drocourt (13)
58.	FC Santes (9)	1–0	FC Bondues (8)
59.	Verlinghem Foot (11)	0–3	US Marquette (8)
60.	US Monchy-au-Bois (12)	2–3	AG Grenay (10)
61.	ES Lambresienne (8)	0–4	Iris Club de Croix (4)
62.	ACO Aiglon (9)	1–3	US Ascq (8)
63.	ES Laventie (10)	0–4	Olympique Lumbrois (6)
64.	JO Wallers-Arenberg (11)	0–2	US Escaudain (8)
65.	Sports Podéens Réunis (11)	0–2	ES Villers-Outréaux (9)
66.	FC Annœullin (10)	1–5	Carabiniers Billy-Montigny (8)
67.	JS Abscon (12)	0–5 (a.e.t.)	IC La Sentinelle (8)
68.	FA Neuvilloise (7)	0–0 (2–4 p)	Feignies Aulnoye FC (5)
69.	ES Boussois (12)	3–5	FC Quarouble (9)
70.	US Jeumont (11)	2–2 (4–5 p)	US Bavay (10)
71.	FC Lambersart (10)	3–2 (a.e.t.)	SC Guesnain (10)
72.	US Englefontaine (16)	0–1	AC Cambrai (6)
73.	FC Marpent (10)	3–0	AS Sin-le-Noble (9)
74.	FC Avesnes-sur-Helpe (9)	2–1 (a.e.t.)	Dutemple FC Valenciennes (7)
75.	US St Quentin-Bléssy (11)	3–0	Calais Beau-Marais (10)
76.	US Cousolre (11)	0–2	ES Mouvalloise (8)
77.	US Ham (11)	1–3	Tergnier FC (7)

== Fifth round ==
These matches were played on 7 and 8 October 2017.

Fifth round results: Hauts-de-France

Tie no	Home team (tier)	Score	Away team (tier)
1.	AS Marck (6)	1–0	Iris Club de Croix (4)
2.	ES Villers-Outréaux (9)	2–3	OS Fives (7)
3.	US Ribemont Mezieres FC (8)	1–0	FC Campagne-lès-Guines (10)
4.	AS Multien (12)	0–3	US Tourcoing FC (5)
5.	SC Hazebrouck (6)	3–0	Montdidier AC (7)
6.	Olympique Arras (16)	0–5	CS Avion (7)
7.	FC Marpent (10)	0–2	Olympique Grande-Synthe (5)
8.	AS Gamaches (7)	0–1	US Boulogne (3)
9.	RC Labourse (11)	0–13	FC Chambly (3)
10.	US Saint-Omer (6)	0–5	USL Dunkerque (3)
11.	AFC Creil (7)	0–1	US Vimy (6)
12.	JS Lille Wazemmes (9)	0–2	IC La Sentinelle (8)
13.	US Ouvriere Albert (9)	5–1	US St Quentin-Bléssy (11)
14.	AS Nortkerque 95 (10)	0–9	Feignies Aulnoye FC (5)
15.	ES Harondel (9)	0–5	USM Senlisienne (5)
16.	CS Amiens Montières Étouvie (8)	2–5	AC Cambrai (6)
17.	FC Lambersart (10)	0–3	Saint-Amand FC (5)
18.	AS Hellemmes (9)	2–4 (a.e.t.)	Stade Portelois (6)
19.	AS Berck (9)	0–1	AFC Compiègne (6)
20.	AS Glisy (12)	1–1 (5–3 p)	US Ascq (8)
21.	US Escaudain (8)	1–1 (3–5 p)	AC Amiens (4)
22.	FC Quarouble (9)	1–0 (a.e.t.)	Château Thierry-Étampes FC (7)
23.	US St Maurice Loos-en-Gohelle (8)	0–0 (8–7 p)	FC Avesnes-sur-Helpe (9)
24.	SC Moreuil (10)	0–5	Arras FA (4)
25.	US Nœux-les-Mines (7)	1–0	Stade Béthunois (6)
26.	FC Porto Portugais Amiens (7)	4–1	ES Mouvalloise (8)
27.	JS Miannay Lambercourt (9)	1–1 (2–3 p)	Roubaix SC (7)
28.	JS Écourt-St Quentin (11)	0–3	US Chantilly (6)
29.	Carabiniers Billy-Montigny (8)	0–2	AS Beauvais Oise (4)
30.	AS St Sauveur (Oise) (9)	1–2	US St André (10)
31.	ES Caudry (9)	3–0	US Bavay (10)
32.	AO Sainghinoise (9)	1–2	Olympique Marcquois (6)
33.	Olympique Lumbrois (6)	0–1	US Choisy-au-Bac (6)
34.	AG Grenay (10)	1–0	FC Soissons (7)
35.	US Marquette (8)	0–4	US Noyelles-sous-Lens (9)
36.	US Crépy Vivaise (9)	1–4	Tergnier FC (7)
37.	CS Diana Liévin (11)	2–3	Entente Itancourt-Neuville (6)
38.	US Wattrelos (9)	1–1 (4–3 p)	US Buire-Hirson-Thiérache (7)
39.	SC Coquelles (9)	0–0 (4–2 p)	ESC Longueau (6)
40.	FC Santes (9)	0–3	US Roye-Noyon (5)

== Sixth round ==
These matches were played on 21 and 22 October and 5 November 2017. Sixth round results: Hauts-de-France

Tie no	Home team (tier)	Score	Away team (tier)
1.	US Ouvriere Albert (9)	0–4	USL Dunkerque (3)
2.	AC Cambrai (6)	3–2	Olympique Grande-Synthe (5)
3.	US St André (10)	0–1 (Note: The original fixture on 22 October was abandoned after 22 minutes (with the scoreline 0–0) by the referee, due to death threats from a member of the crowd. Match was resumed on 5 November by order of the Ligue de Hauts-de-France.)	Entente Itancourt-Neuville (6)
4.	AG Grenay (10)	0–0 (4–5 p)	US Nœux-les-Mines (7)
5.	US Ribemont Mezieres FC (8)	1–2 (a.e.t.)	SC Hazebrouck (6)
6.	CS Avion (7)	0–0 (2–4 p)	US Choisy-au-Bac (6)
7.	FC Quarouble (9)	2–1	Tergnier FC (7)
8.	US Wattrelos (9)	0–0 (2–3 p)	Saint-Amand FC (5)
9.	US Roye-Noyon (5)	0–0 (6–7 p)	AFC Compiègne (6)
10.	SC Coquelles (9)	0–3	US Chantilly (6)
11.	AS Marck (6)	0–1	FC Chambly (3)
12.	US St Maurice Loos-en-Gohelle (8)	0–2	US Boulogne (3)
13.	IC La Sentinelle (8)	0–1	Arras FA (4)
14.	Stade Portelois (6)	1–1 (0–3 p)	AS Beauvais Oise (4)
15.	OS Fives (7)	2–2 (5–3 p)	US Tourcoing FC (5)
16.	US Noyelles-sous-Lens (9)	0–5	USM Senlisienne (5)
17.	US Vimy (6)	4–0	AC Amiens (4)
18.	ES Caudry (9)	0–5	Feignies Aulnoye FC (5)
19.	AS Glisy (12)	0–4	FC Porto Portugais Amiens (7)
20.	Roubaix SC (7)	0–3	Olympique Marcquois (6)
