= 2007–08 Lille OSC season =

Lille
2007–08 season
- President: Michel Seydoux
- Head coach: Claude Puel
- Stadium: Stadium Lille Métropole
- Ligue 1: 7th
- Coupe de France: Round of 16
- Coupe de la Ligue: Third round
- Top goalscorer: League: Michel Bastos (8); All: Michel Bastos (8)
- Average home league attendance: 17,175
Home colours	Away colours

The 2007–08 season was the 64th season in the existence of Lille OSC and the club's eighth consecutive season in the top flight of French football. In addition to competing in the domestic league, Lille also participated in the Coupe de France and the Coupe de la Ligue.

== Players ==
=== First-team squad ===
Note: Flags indicate national team as defined under FIFA eligibility rules; some limited exceptions apply. Players may hold more than one non-FIFA nationality.

No.	Pos.	Nation	Player
1	GK	SEN	Tony Sylva
2	MF	FRA	Mathieu Debuchy
3	MF	FRA	Samuel Robail
4	DF	FRA	Jérémy Taravel
6	FW	FRA	Pierre-Alain Frau
7	MF	FRA	Yohan Cabaye
8	DF	BRA	Michel Fernandes Bastos
9	FW	NED	Patrick Kluivert
10	MF	POL	Ludovic Obraniak
11	FW	GUI	Souleymane Youla
12	FW	FRA	Kamulete Makiese
13	FW	FRA	Nicolas Fauvergue
14	MF	COL	Luis Alfredo Yanes Padilla
15	DF	BRA	Emerson da Conceição
16	GK	FRA	Grégory Malicki
17	MF	CMR	Jean Makoun

No.	Pos.	Nation	Player
18	DF	MAD	Franck Beria
19	DF	FRA	Peter Franquart
20	DF	FRA	Grégory Tafforeau (captain)
21	MF	CRO	Marko Marić
22	MF	CMR	Aurélien Chedjou
23	DF	MAR	Adil Rami
24	MF	FRA	Rio Mavuba (on loan from Villarreal CF)
25	DF	FRA	Nicolas Plestan
26	DF	SUI	Stephan Lichtsteiner
27	FW	BEL	Kevin Mirallas
28	DF	CMR	Henri Ewane-Elong
29	MF	FRA	Stéphane Dumont
30	GK	FRA	Laurent Pichon
33	MF	BEL	Eden Hazard
34	DF	ALG	Badis Lebbihi
35	MF	FRA	Omar Benzerga
40	GK	FRA	Alexander Oukidja

=== Players out on loan ===
Note: Flags indicate national team as defined under FIFA eligibility rules; some limited exceptions apply. Players may hold more than one non-FIFA nationality.

No.	Pos.	Nation	Player
3	DF	FRA	Alexis Zywiecki (at Dijon FCO)
6	MF	CIV	Flavien Le Postollec (at FC Brussels)
5	DF	BRA	Rafael Schmitz (at Birmingham City)
10	MF	SUI	Daniel Gygax (at FC Metz)
24	MF	FRA	Samuel Robail (at US Boulogne)
--	DF	CMR	Dieudonné Owona (at FC Brussels)
32	GK	FRA	Yohan Lacroix (at L'Entente SSG)
6	FW	SWE	Emra Tahirović (at FC Zürich)
5	FW	FRA	Larson Touré (at Grenoble Foot 38)

== Transfers ==
=== In ===
Note: Flags indicate national team as defined under FIFA eligibility rules; some limited exceptions apply. Players may hold more than one non-FIFA nationality.

No.	Pos.	Nation	Player
18	DF	FRA	Franck Béria (from FC Metz)
14	MF	COL	Luis Yanes (from Independiente Santa Fe)
21	MF	CRO	Marko Marić (from Egaleo FC)
6	FW	SWE	Emra Tahirović (from Halmstads BK)
9	FW	NED	Patrick Kluivert (from PSV)

=== Out ===
Note: Flags indicate national team as defined under FIFA eligibility rules; some limited exceptions apply. Players may hold more than one non-FIFA nationality.

No.	Pos.	Nation	Player
—	DF	SRB	Milivoje Vitakić (to Grenoble)
—	DF	GRE	Stathis Tavlaridis (to AS Saint-Étienne)
—	DF	FRA	Mathieu Chalmé (to Bordeaux)
—	MF	FRA	Mathieu Robail (to Dijon FCO)
—	MF	FRA	Mathieu Bodmer (to Lyon)
—	FW	CIV	Kader Keïta (to Lyon)
—	FW	FRA	Johan Audel (to Valenciennes FC)
—	FW	NGA	Peter Odemwingie (to FC Lokomotiv Moscow)

== Pre-season and friendlies ==
Win Draw Loss

== Competitions ==
=== Overall record ===
Competition	First match	Last match	Starting round	Final position	Record							
Competition	First match	Last match	Starting round	Final position	Pld	W	D	L	GF	GA	GD	Win %
Ligue 1	4 August 2007	May 2008	Matchday 1		38	13	18	7	45	32	+13	34.21
Coupe de France	6 January 2008	19 March 2008	Round of 64	Round of 16	3	2	0	1	4	4	+0	66.67
Coupe de la Ligue	26 September 2007		Third round	Third round	1	0	0	1	0	1	−1	0.00
Total					42	15	18	9	49	37	+12	35.71

Source: Competitions

=== Ligue 1 ===
==== League table ====
Pos	Team	Pld	W	D	L	GF	GA	GD	Pts	Qualification or relegation
5	Saint-Étienne	38	16	10	12	47	34	+13	58	Qualification to UEFA Cup first round
6	Rennes	38	16	10	12	47	44	+3	58	Qualification to Intertoto Cup third round
7	Lille	38	13	18	7	45	32	+13	57	
8	Nice	38	13	16	9	35	30	+5	55	
9	Le Mans	38	14	11	13	46	49	−3	53	

Source: Ligue 1
Rules for classification: 1) points; 2) goal difference; 3) number of goals scored.

==== Results summary ====
Overall								Home						Away					
Pld	W	D	L	GF	GA	GD	Pts	W	D	L	GF	GA	GD	W	D	L	GF	GA	GD
38	13	18	7	45	32	+13	57	8	7	4	29	18	+11	5	11	3	16	14	+2

Source: Ligue 1

==== Results by round ====
Round	1	2	3	4	5	6	7	8	9	10	11	12	13	14	15	16	17	18	19	20	21	22	23	24	25	26	27	28	29	30	31	32	33	34	35	36	37	38
Ground	H	A	H	A	A	H	A	H	A	H	A	H	A	H	A	H	A	H	A	H	A	H	H	A	H	A	H	A	H	A	H	A	H	A	H	A	H	A
Result	D	W	D	D	D	L	D	D	D	W	L	L	W	D	L	D	L	W	W	D	D	W	D	D	W	D	L	D	W	W	L	D	W	W	W	D	W	D
Position	13	5	8	9	10	12	11	12	14	11	11	13	12	12	14	15	18	15	14	11	13	10	11	12	11	10	11	11	7	7	9	9	8	6	6	6	5	7

Source: Ligue 1
A = Away; H = Home; W = Win; D = Draw; L = Loss

==== Matches ====
4 August 2007 1	Lille	0–0	Lorient	Villeneuve-d'Ascq
				Stadium: Stadium Lille Métropole

12 August 2007 2	Metz	1–2	Lille	Metz
				Stadium: Stade Saint-Symphorien

15 August 2007 3	Lille	1–1	Sochaux	Villeneuve-d'Ascq
				Stadium: Stadium Lille Métropole

18 August 2007 4	Le Mans	1–1	Lille	Le Mans
				Stadium: Stade Léon-Bollée

26 August 2007 5	Paris Saint-Germain	1–1	Lille	Paris
18:00				Stadium: Parc des Princes; Referee: Fredy Fautrel

29 August 2007 6	Lille	0–1	Monaco	Villeneuve-d'Ascq
				Stadium: Stadium Lille Métropole

1 September 2007 7	Rennes	2–2	Lille	Rennes
20:00				Stadium: Stade de la Route de Lorient; Referee: Philippe Kalt

15 September 2007 8	Lille	1–1	Bordeaux	Villeneuve-d'Ascq
				Stadium: Stadium Lille Métropole

23 September 2007 9	Lyon	1–1	Lille	Lyon
21:00				Stadium: Stade de Gerland; Referee: Saïd Ennjimi

6 October 2007 10	Lille	3–0	Valenciennes	Villeneuve-d'Ascq
				Stadium: Stadium Lille Métropole

20 October 2007 11	Caen	1–0	Lille	Caen
				Stadium: Stade Michel d'Ornano

27 October 2007 12	Lille	0–3	Strasbourg	Villeneuve-d'Ascq
				Stadium: Stadium Lille Métropole

3 November 2007 13	Auxerre	0–1	Lille	Auxerre
				Stadium: Stade de l'Abbé-Deschamps

10 November 2007 14	Lille	1–1	Nice	Villeneuve-d'Ascq
				Stadium: Stadium Lille Métropole

24 November 2007 15	Nancy	2–0	Lille	Tomblaine
				Stadium: Stade Marcel Picot

1 December 2007 16	Lille	1–1	Marseille	Villeneuve-d'Ascq
				Stadium: Stadium Lille Métropole

8 December 2007 17	Toulouse	1–0	Lille	Toulouse
				Stadium: Stadium de Toulouse

15 December 2007 18	Lille	3–0	Saint-Étienne	Villeneuve-d'Ascq
				Stadium: Stadium Lille Métropole

12 January 2008 20	Lille	1–1	Metz	Villeneuve-d'Ascq
				Stadium: Stadium Lille Métropole

19 January 2008 21	Sochaux	1–1	Lille	Montbéliard
				Stadium: Stade Auguste Bonal

23 January 2008 22	Lille	3–1	Lorient	Villeneuve-d'Ascq
				Stadium: Stadium Lille Métropole

26 January 2008 23	Lille	0–0	Paris Saint-Germain	Villeneuve-d'Ascq
				Stadium: Stadium Lille Métropole

9 February 2008 24	Monaco	0–0	Lille	Monaco
				Stadium: Stade Louis II

16 February 2008 25	Lille	3–1	Rennes	Villeneuve-d'Ascq
				Stadium: Stadium Lille Métropole

24 February 2008 26	Bordeaux	0–0	Lille	Bordeaux
				Stadium: Stade Chaban-Delmas

1 March 2008 27	Lille	0–1	Lyon	Villeneuve-d'Ascq
				Stadium: Stadium Lille Métropole

8 March 2008 28	Valenciennes	0–0	Lille	Valenciennes
				Stadium: Stade du Hainaut

11 March 2008 19	Lens	1–2	Lille	Lens
				Stadium: Stade Bollaert-Delelis

15 March 2008 28	Lille	5–0	Caen	Villeneuve-d'Ascq
				Stadium: Stadium Lille Métropole

22 March 2008 30	Strasbourg	0–1	Lille	Strasbourg
				Stadium: Stade de la Meinau

30 March 2008 31	Lille	0–2	Auxerre	Villeneuve-d'Ascq
				Stadium: Stadium Lille Métropole

5 April 2008 33	Nice	0–0	Lille	Nice
				Stadium: Stade du Ray

12 April 2008 33	Lille	2–1	Nancy	Villeneuve-d'Ascq
				Stadium: Stadium Lille Métropole

20 April 2008 34	Marseille	1–3	Lille	Marseille
20:55		Report		Stadium: Stade Vélodrome; Referee: Tony Chapron

26 April 2008 35	Lille	3–2	Toulouse	Villeneuve-d'Ascq
				Stadium: Stadium Lille Métropole

4 May 2008 36	Saint-Étienne	0–0	Lille	Saint-Étienne
18:00				Stadium: Bruno Ruffray; Referee: Bruno Ruffray

10 May 2008 37	Lille	2–1	Lens	Villeneuve-d'Ascq
				Stadium: Stadium Lille Métropole

17 May 2008 38	Lorient	1–1	Lille	Lorient
				Stadium: Stade du Moustoir

== Statistics ==
=== Goalscorers ===
Rank	Pos.	No.	Player	Ligue 1	Coupe de France	Coupe de la Ligue	Total
1	DF	17	(Brazil) Michel Bastos	8	0	0	8
2	MF	18	(France) Yohan Cabaye	7	0	0	7
2	FW	8	(Belgium) Kevin Mirallas	6	1	0	7
4	DF	11	(Switzerland) Stephan Lichtsteiner	4	1	0	5
Total				45	4	0	49
