= 2006–07 Lille OSC season =

Lille
2006–07 season
- President: Michel Seydoux
- Head coach: Claude Puel
- Stadium: Stadium Lille Métropole; Stade Bollaert-Delelis (Champions League matches)
- Ligue 1: 10th
- Coupe de France: Round of 16
- Coupe de la Ligue: Round of 16
- Champions League: Round of 16
- Top goalscorer: League: Abdul Kader Keïta (9); All: Abdul Kader Keïta (10)
- Average home league attendance: 14,175
| Home colours | Away colours |

The 2006–07 season was the 62nd season in the existence of Lille OSC and the club's seventh consecutive season in the top flight of French football. In addition to the domestic league, Lille participated in this season's editions of the Coupe de France, Coupe de la Ligue and UEFA Champions League. The season covered the period from 1 July 2006 to 30 June 2007.

== First-team squad ==
Squad at end of season

Note: Flags indicate national team as defined under FIFA eligibility rules; some limited exceptions apply. Players may hold more than one non-FIFA nationality.

| No. | Pos. | Nation | Player |
|---|---|---|---|
| 1 | GK | SEN | Tony Sylva |
| 2 | MF | FRA | Mathieu Debuchy |
| 4 | DF | GRE | Stathis Tavlaridis |
| 5 | DF | BRA | Rafael Schmitz |
| 7 | MF | FRA | Yohan Cabaye |
| 8 | MF | BRA | Michel Bastos |
| 9 | FW | FRA | Johan Audel (Note: Audel was born in Nice, France, but also qualified to represent Martinique internationally and would make his international debut for Martinique in 2016.) |
| 10 | MF | FRA | Ludovic Obraniak (Note: Obraniak was born in Longeville-lès-Metz, France, and represented them at U-21 level, but also qualified to represent Poland internationally through his paternal grandfather and would make his international debut for Poland in July 2009.) |
| 11 | FW | GUI | Souleymane Youla |
| 12 | MF | FRA | Mathieu Bodmer |
| 13 | FW | FRA | Nicolas Fauvergue |
| 14 | FW | NGA | Peter Odemwingie (Note: Odemwingie was born in Tashkent, Soviet Union (now Uzbekistan), but was raised in Nigeria from the age of 2 and made his international debut for Nigeria in May 2002.) |
| 15 | DF | BRA | Emerson |
| 16 | GK | FRA | Grégory Malicki |
| 17 | MF | CMR | Jean Makoun |

| No. | Pos. | Nation | Player |
|---|---|---|---|
| 19 | DF | FRA | Peter Franquart |
| 20 | DF | FRA | Grégory Tafforeau |
| 21 | DF | FRA | Matthieu Chalmé |
| 22 | DF | SRB | Milivoje Vitakić |
| 23 | FW | CIV | Abdul Kader Keïta |
| 25 | DF | FRA | Nicolas Plestan |
| 26 | DF | SUI | Stephan Lichtsteiner |
| 27 | MF | BEL | Kevin Mirallas |
| 29 | MF | FRA | Stéphane Dumont |
| 30 | GK | FRA | Laurent Pichon |
| 31 | MF | FRA | Mathieu Robail |
| 33 | MF | CMR | Henri Ewane-Elong |
| — | DF | CMR | Aurélien Chedjou |
| — | FW | FRA | Chris Makiese |

=== Left club during season ===
Note: Flags indicate national team as defined under FIFA eligibility rules; some limited exceptions apply. Players may hold more than one non-FIFA nationality.

| No. | Pos. | Nation | Player |
|---|---|---|---|
| 3 | DF | FRA | Alexis Zywiecki (on loan to Dijon) |
| 6 | MF | CIV | Flavien Le Postollec (on loan to FC Brussels) |
| 10 | FW | SUI | Daniel Gygax (to Metz) |
| 15 | MF | SVN | Milenko Ačimovič (to Al-Ittihad) |

| No. | Pos. | Nation | Player |
|---|---|---|---|
| 24 | MF | FRA | Samuel Robail (to Boulogne) |
| 28 | DF | CMR | Dieudonné Owona (on loan to FC Brussels) |
| 32 | GK | FRA | Yohann Lacroix (on loan to L'Entente SSG) |

== Competitions ==
=== Overview ===
| Competition | First match | Last match | Starting round | Final position | Record | | | | | | | |
| Competition | First match | Last match | Starting round | Final position | Pld | W | D | L | GF | GA | GD | Win % |
|---|---|---|---|---|---|---|---|---|---|---|---|---|
| Ligue 1 | 5 August 2006 | 26 May 2007 | Matchday 1 | 10th | 38 | 13 | 11 | 14 | 45 | 43 | +2 | 34.21 |
| Coupe de France | 6 January 2007 | 31 January 2007 | Round of 64 | Round of 16 | 3 | 2 | 0 | 1 | 5 | 3 | +2 | 66.67 |
| Coupe de la Ligue | 19 September 2006 | 24 October 2006 | Third round | Round of 16 | 2 | 1 | 0 | 1 | 1 | 2 | −1 | 50.00 |
| UEFA Champions League | 9 August 2006 | 7 March 2007 | Third qualifying round | Round of 16 | 10 | 4 | 3 | 3 | 12 | 7 | +5 | 40.00 |
| Total | | | | | 53 | 20 | 14 | 19 | 63 | 55 | +8 | 37.74 |

Source: Competitions

=== Ligue 1 ===
==== League table ====
| Pos | Team | Pld | W | D | L | GF | GA | GD | Pts |
|---|---|---|---|---|---|---|---|---|---|
| 8 | Auxerre | 38 | 13 | 15 | 10 | 41 | 41 | 0 | 54 |
| 9 | Monaco | 38 | 13 | 12 | 13 | 45 | 38 | +7 | 51 |
| 10 | Lille | 38 | 13 | 11 | 14 | 45 | 43 | +2 | 50 |
| 11 | Saint-Étienne | 38 | 14 | 7 | 17 | 52 | 50 | +2 | 49 |
| 12 | Le Mans | 38 | 11 | 16 | 11 | 45 | 46 | −1 | 49 |

Source: Ligue 1
Rules for classification: 1) points; 2) goal difference; 3) number of goals scored.

==== Results summary ====
| Overall | | | | | | | | Home | | | | | | Away | | | | | |
| Pld | W | D | L | GF | GA | GD | Pts | W | D | L | GF | GA | GD | W | D | L | GF | GA | GD |
|---|---|---|---|---|---|---|---|---|---|---|---|---|---|---|---|---|---|---|---|
| 38 | 13 | 11 | 14 | 45 | 43 | +2 | 50 | 9 | 5 | 5 | 26 | 16 | +10 | 4 | 6 | 9 | 19 | 27 | −8 |

Source: Ligue 1

==== Results by round ====
| Round | 1 | 2 | 3 | 4 | 5 | 6 | 7 | 8 | 9 | 10 | 11 | 12 | 13 | 14 | 15 | 16 | 17 | 18 | 19 | 20 | 21 | 22 | 23 | 24 | 25 | 26 | 27 | 28 | 29 | 30 | 31 | 32 | 33 | 34 | 35 | 36 | 37 | 38 |
|---|---|---|---|---|---|---|---|---|---|---|---|---|---|---|---|---|---|---|---|---|---|---|---|---|---|---|---|---|---|---|---|---|---|---|---|---|---|---|
| Ground | A | H | A | H | A | H | A | H | A | H | A | A | H | A | H | A | H | A | H | A | H | A | H | A | H | A | H | A | H | H | A | H | A | H | A | H | A | H |
| Result | W | W | L | W | D | L | L | W | D | W | D | W | W | D | D | W | D | L | D | D | W | W | D | L | L | L | W | D | L | L | L | W | L | L | L | W | L | D |
| Position | 4 | 1 | 4 | 3 | 3 | 6 | 9 | 5 | 6 | 5 | 4 | 3 | 2 | 2 | 2 | 3 | 3 | 4 | 5 | 5 | 4 | 2 | 3 | 3 | 3 | 6 | 3 | 3 | 4 | 6 | 8 | 6 | 8 | 9 | 10 | 9 | 10 | 10 |

Source: Ligue 1
A = Away; H = Home; W = Win; D = Draw; L = Loss

=== Champions League ===
==== Third qualifying round ====
| 9 August 2006 First leg | Lille (France) | 3–0 | (North Macedonia) Rabotnički | Villeneuve-d'Ascq, France |
| 18:00 | Jovanovski 60' (o.g.); Bastos 70' (pen.); Fauvergue 72' | Report | | Stadium: Stadium Lille Métropole; Attendance: 9,560; Referee: Vladimír Hriňák (Slovakia) |

| 23 August 2006 Second leg | Rabotnički (North Macedonia) | 0–1 (0–4 agg.) | (France) Lille | Skopje, Macedonia |
| 20:00 | | Report | Audel 18' | Stadium: City Stadium Skopje; Attendance: 6,500; Referee: Costas Kapitanis (Cyprus) |

==== Group stage ====
| Pos | Team | Pld | W | D | L | GF | GA | GD | Pts | Qualification |
|---|---|---|---|---|---|---|---|---|---|---|
| 1 | (Italy) Milan | 6 | 3 | 1 | 2 | 8 | 4 | +4 | 10 | Advance to knockout stage |
| 2 | (France) Lille | 6 | 2 | 3 | 1 | 8 | 5 | +3 | 9 | Advance to knockout stage |
| 3 | (Greece) AEK Athens | 6 | 2 | 2 | 2 | 6 | 9 | −3 | 8 | Transfer to UEFA Cup |
| 4 | (Belgium) Anderlecht | 6 | 0 | 4 | 2 | 7 | 11 | −4 | 4 | |

Source: RSSSF

| 13 September 2006 1 | Anderlecht (Belgium) | 1–1 | (France) Lille | Anderlecht, Belgium |
| 20:45 (20:45 UTC+2) | Pareja 41' | Report | Fauvergue 80' | Stadium: Constant Vanden Stock; Attendance: 21,107; Referee: Stuart Dougal (Scotland) |

| 26 September 2006 2 | Lille (France) | 0–0 | (Italy) Milan | Lens, France |
| 20:45 (20:45 UTC+2) | | Report | | Stadium: Stade Félix Bollaert; Attendance: 35,000; Referee: Manuel Mejuto González (Spain) |

| 17 October 2006 3 | Lille (France) | 3–1 | (Greece) AEK Athens | Lens, France |
| 20:45 (20:45 UTC+2) | Robail 64'; Gygax 82'; Makoun 90+1' | Report | Ivić 68' | Stadium: Stade Félix Bollaert; Attendance: 33,000; Referee: Florian Meyer (Germany) |

| 1 November 2006 4 | AEK Athens (Greece) | 1–0 | (France) Lille | Athens, Greece |
| 20:45 | Lyberopoulos 74' | Report | | Stadium: Olympic Stadium; Attendance: 50,000; Referee: Steve Bennett (England) |

| 21 November 2006 5 | Lille (France) | 2–2 | (Belgium) Anderlecht | Lens, France |
| 20:45 | Odemwingie 28'; Fauvergue 47' | Report | Mpenza 38', 48' | Stadium: Stade Félix Bollaert; Attendance: 40,000; Referee: Tom Henning Øvrebø (Norway) |

| 6 December 2006 6 | Milan (Italy) | 0–2 | (France) Lille | Milan, Italy |
| 20:45 | | Report | Odemwingie 7'; Keïta 67' | Stadium: San Siro; Attendance: 20,000; Referee: Graham Poll (England) |

==== Knockout phase ====
===== Round of 16 =====
| 20 February 2007 First leg | Lille (France) | 0–1 | (England) Manchester United | Lens, France |
| 20:45 | | Report | Giggs 83' | Stadium: Stade Félix Bollaert; Attendance: 41,000; Referee: Eric Braamhaar (Netherlands) |

| 7 March 2007 Second leg | Manchester United (England) | 1–0 (2–0 agg.) | (France) Lille | Manchester, England |
| 20:45 | Larsson 72' | Report | | Stadium: Old Trafford; Attendance: 75,182; Referee: Luis Medina Cantalejo (Spain) |
