= Robail =

Robail is a surname. Notable people with the surname include:

- Gaëtan Robail (born 1994), French footballer
- Mathieu Robail (born 1985), French footballer
- Samuel Robail (born 1985), French footballer
- Robail Yasrab (born 1994), Senior AI Researcher at University of Cambridge and University of Oxford
