= 2021–22 Coupe de France preliminary rounds, Hauts-de-France =

The 2021–22 Coupe de France preliminary rounds, Hauts-de-France was the qualifying competition to decide which teams from the leagues of the Hauts-de-France region of France took part in the main competition from the seventh round.

A total of twenty teams qualified from the Hauts-de-France preliminary rounds. In 2020–21, US Boulogne progressed furthest in the main competition, reaching the round of 16 before losing to Canet Roussillon FC.

== Draws and fixtures ==
On 21 July 2021, the Oise district league published that 1024 teams from the region had entered the competition. Draws for the first two rounds were carried out separately by district leagues during July, with 818 teams in total entering at the first round stage, and 187 at the second round stage. The third round draw was published on 13 September 2021. The fourth round draw was published on 23 September 2021. The fifth round draw was made on 7 October 2021. The sixth round draw was made on 19 October 2021.

=== First round ===
These matches were played on 28 and 29 August 2021.

First round results: Hauts-de-France
Tie no	Home team (tier)	Score	Away team (tier)
1.	US Rivière (12)	1–0	ES Vendin (11)
2.	Olympique Vendin (12)	2–1	AC Noyelles-Godault (11)
3.	AS Noyelles-lés-Vermelles (12)	0–8	ES Labeuvrière (9)
4.	ÉS Eleu (12)	0–2	JF Guarbecque (9)
5.	Olympique Burbure (11)	3–0	ES Bois-Bernard Acheville (12)
6.	AJ Artois (11)	3–0	RC Avesnes-le-Comte (12)
7.	Olympique Arras (12)	4–1	US Lestrem (10)
8.	ES Allouagne (12)	0–1	FC Hersin (11)
9.	ES Angres (12)	1–1 (4–3 p)	ES Laventie (10)
10.	US Ruch Carvin (11)	1–0	AAE Évin-Malmaison (10)
11.	AAE Dourges (11)	0–3 (Note: Tie won by means of forfeit.)	USA Liévin (9)
12.	US Beuvry (11)	3–1	ES Douvrin (12)
13.	AS Bapaume-Bertincourt-Vaulx-Vraucourt (11)	0–2	US Grenay (10)
14.	US Billy-Berclau (9)	1–0	UC Divion (10)
15.	US Gonnehem-Busnettes (10)	0–4	ES Sainte-Catherine (9)
16.	AS Auchy-les-Mines (13)	0–1	USO Drocourt (10)
17.	FC Montigny-en-Gohelle (9)	2–2 (4–3 p)	US Courcelles (10)
18.	ASPTT Arras (15)	3–5	AS Roclincourt (13)
19.	AS Bonnières Houvin (15)	0–2	AS Maroeuil (13)
20.	FC Busnes (13)	0–5	JF Mazingarbe (12)
21.	US Ham-en-Artois (14)	0–3	CS Pernes (13)
22.	SC Aubigny Savy-Berlette (13)	3–0	SCF Achicourt (14)
23.	AS Neuvireuil-Gavrelle (13)	2–4	US Houdain (12)
24.	OC Cojeul (12)	0–3	AS Loison (10)
25.	AS Courrièroise (11)	3–2	US Ablain (12)
26.	Intrépides Norrent-Fontes (12)	2–2 (3–1 p)	AS Lensoise (11)
27.	FC Camblain-Châtelain (11)	2–3	La Couture FC (10)
28.	US Pas-en-Artois (11)	1–1 (3–1 p)	AS Violaines (10)
29.	ES Haisnes (10)	0–2	USO Lens (9)
30.	EC Mazingarbe (10)	0–2	US Noyelles-sous-Lens (9)
31.	JS Bourecquoise (15)	1–3	ES Ourton (14)
32.	AS Reseau Corpo Bruay (15)	0–4	Entente Verquin-Béthune (13)
33.	US Lapugnoy (13) (Note: US Lapugnoy replaced FC Estevelles in the original draw.)	0–3	RC Locon 2000 (13)
34.	FC Givenchy-en-Gohelle (14)	2–0	Stade Héninois (12)
35.	FC Verquigneul (13)	2–3	FC Annay (11)
36.	US Boubers-Conchy (13)	4–3	AS Barlin (12)
37.	US Hesdigneul (11)	5–2	AS Frévent (12)
38.	FC La Roupie-Isbergues (12)	4–0	FC Servins (13)
39.	Sud Artois Foot (11)	3–3 (4–5 p)	AS Beaurains (10)
40.	AS Tincquizel (10)	0–1	FC Lillers (11)
41.	Olympique Liévin (10)	0–6	ES Anzin-Saint-Aubin (9)
42.	Auchel FC (9)	1–1 (5–4 p)	US Monchy-au-Bois (10)
43.	SC Fouquières (12)	0–2	US Annezin (11)
44.	FC Cuinchy (15)	0–0 (4–1 p)	US Croisette (14)
45.	AS Kennedy Hénin-Beaumont (15)	3–2	RC Vaudricourt (13)
46.	AS Cauchy-à-la-Tour (14)	1–4	CSAL Souchez (12)
47.	RC Chocques (14)	0–2	AJ Neuville (12)
48.	FC Hauts Lens (12)	2–3	ES Saulty (12)
49.	ES Agny (13)	3–6	AAE Aix-Noulette (11)
50.	AOSC Sallaumines (13)	2–1	US Arleux-en-Gohelle (11)
51.	Avion République FC (13)	1–2	AS Brebières (11)
52.	US Cheminots Avion (11)	3–4	US Croisilles (10)
53.	Olympique Héninois (11)	3–3 (3–4 p)	USO Meurchin (10)
54.	FCE La Bassée (15)	1–0	ES Haillicourt (14)
55.	Diables Rouges Lambres-lez-Aire (15)	2–1	AS Lyssois (13)
56.	Olympique La Comté Omnisport (15)	4–2	AS Vendin (13)
57.	AS Quiéry-la-Motte (15)	1–6	ES Val Sensée (12)
58.	ES Ficheux (14)	2–2 (3–4 p)	FC Beaumont (13)
59.	AFC Libercourtois (14)	0–3	CS Habarcq (12)
60.	AS Vallée de la Ternoise (12)	2–2 (4–5 p)	AS Sailly-Labourse (11)
61.	US Izel-lès-Équerchin (13)	3–4	RC Sains (12)
62.	AJ Ruitz (13)	3–0	FC Dainvillois (13)
63.	AS Bailleul-Sir-Berthoult (13)	2–2 (4–3 p)	FC Hinges (11)
64.	US Maisnil (13)	1–0	US Mondicourt (13)
65.	US Glageon (12)	2–6	US Rousies (10)
66.	SC Maubeuge (10)	0–1	US Gommegnies-Carnoy (10)
67.	US Sars-Poteries (14)	0–0 (7–8 p)	SCEPS Pont-sur-Sambre (12)
68.	Unicité FC (13)	0–3	FC Aunelle (12)
69.	AS Obies (13)	0–2	ASJ Montplaisir (11)
70.	AS Trélon (11)	0–1	ES Boussois (10)
71.	US Landrecies (15)	0–3	CA Sainsois (13)
72.	US Bousies Forest (14)	1–5	ASG Louvroil (9)
73.	AFC Colleret (13)	0–0 (2–4 p)	FC Jenlain (13)
74.	FC Leval (13)	2–4	US Villers-Sire-Nicole (14)
75.	JS Avesnelloise (13)	2–3 (Note: Match abandoned during additional time in the second half. Under review by the disciplinary committee. JS Avesnelloise penalised. AS Recquignies qualify.)	AS Recquignies (12)
76.	AS La Longueville (10)	0–3	US Berlaimont (9)
77.	Maubeuge Olympique (14)	1–11	US Beaufort/Limont-Fontaine (12)
78.	SC Bachant (11)	1–3	AFC Ferrière-la-Petite (12)
79.	US Villers-Pol (12)	6–1	AS Étrœungt (13)
80.	Wignehies Olympique (12)	0–2	AS Dompierre (13)
81.	Olympique Maroilles (10)	6–0	OSC Assevent (11)
82.	IC Ferrière-la-Grande (9)	2–1	US Cousolre (9)
83.	AS Bellignies (14)	3–2	US Prisches (12)
84.	AO Hermies (10)	2–3	FC Neuville-Saint-Rémy (11)
85.	AS Neuvilly (12)	0–1	Entente Ligny/Olympique Caullery (10)
86.	US Viesly (11)	1–1 (7–6 p)	AS Vendegies-Escarmain (11)
87.	US Aubigny-au-Bac (12)	0–3	FC Provillois (9)
88.	US Les Rues-des-Vignes (13)	6–0	ACRS Portugaise Cambrai (13)
89.	US Briastre (13)	2–4	FC Solesmes (11)
90.	FC Iwuy (10)	0–2	US Saint-Aubert (9)
91.	OC Avesnois (13)	7–0	SS Marcoing (11)
92.	FC Villers-en-Cauchies (15)	0–4	US Saint-Souplet (10)
93.	FC Maretz (13)	0–12	ES Paillencourt-Estrun (10)
94.	SC Osartis-Marquion (13)	4–3	AS Montay (14)
95.	US Quievy (11)	2–0	US Beauvois Fontaine (11)
96.	US Ors (13)	2–2 (1–4 p)	ES Crespin (10) (Note: ES Crespin replaced FC Le Pommereuil in the original draw.)
97.	SC Le Cateau (12)	3–1	FC Fontaine-au-Bois (12)
98.	Olympique Saint-Ollois (12)	– (Note: FC Saulzoir penalised for fielding a suspended player. Olympique Saint-Ollois qualify. Original scoreline unknown.)	FC Saulzoir (10)
99.	US Fontaine-Notre-Dame (11)	1–0	US Rumilly (11)
100.	US Bertry-Clary (12)	0–4	FC Cambrai-Saint Roch (11)
101.	RC Lécluse (14)	9–0	FC Nomain (12)
102.	FC Fressain-Cantin (13)	0–4	ESM Hamel (10)
103.	FC Écaillon (14)	2–2 (3–1 p)	FC Minier Lewardois (14)
104.	US Frais Marais (10)	2–5	AS Sin-le-Noble (10)
105.	US Auberchicourt (12)	2–2 (2–4 p)	US Pecquencourt (12)
106.	Olympique Marquette (13)	1–3	UF Anhiers (11)
107.	AS Douai-Lambres Cheminots (14)	2–4	US Corbehem (11)
108.	FC Bruille-lez-Marchiennes (13)	0–5	Olympique Flinois (9)
109.	DC Lallaing (12)	0–1	AS Coutiches (13)
110.	FC Monchecourt (13)	0–7	AS Cuincy (11)
111.	FC Pecquencourt (13)	3–1	FC Féchain (14)
112.	US Aubygeoise (12)	11–1	Dechy Sports (13)
113.	Olympic Marchiennois (13)	2–8	FC Estrées (14)
114.	USAC Somain (10)	3–1	FC Anor (13) (Note: FC Anor replaced US Montigny-en-Ostrevent in the original draw.)
115.	US Erre-Hornaing (9)	1–0	US Pont Flers (10)
116.	Olympique Landasien (12)	3–1	FC Roost-Warendin (11)
117.	Fenain ES (15)	0–1	US Loffre-Erchin (14)
118.	US Raimbeaucourt (10)	1–4	FC Férin (10)
119.	US Briquette (11)	1–4	SC Lourches (12)
120.	FC Condé-Macou (14)	4–4 (3–5 p)	US Haulchin (12)
121.	US Verchain-Maugré (13)	0–3	AS Artres (12)
122.	Douchy FC (11)	3–0	JS Haveluy (12)
123.	US Quiévrechain (14)	4–1	Saint-Waast CFC (12)
124.	CO Trith-Saint-Léger (10)	4–0	JS Abscon (10)
125.	RC Rœulx (13)	3–2	AFC Escautpont (10)
126.	AS Wavrechain-sous-Denain (13)	0–4	Olympique Onnaingeois (10)
127.	US Hergnies (14)	0–6	AG Solrézienne (9) (Note: AG Solrézienne replaced Denain OSC in the original draw.)
128.	JO Wallers-Arenberg (9)	3–2 (Note: Tie reversed from original draw.)	Vieux Condé Foot (9)
129.	FC Saultain (12)	2–2 (3–2 p)	Stade Fresnois (10)
130.	EA Prouvy (10)	0–2	Maing FC (9)
131.	ES Sebourg-Estreux (13)	1–5	AS Summer Club Valenciennes (10)
132.	SC Vicq (12)	2–6	FC Lecelles-Rosult (10)
133.	AS Petite-Forêt (13)	0–10	Anzin FARC (10)
134.	Neuville OSC (13)	1–7	USM Marly (9)
135.	FC Haspres (15)	3–3 (5–4 p)	USM Beuvrages (10)
136.	AS Thivencelle (13)	3–8	Hérin-Aubry CLE (14)
137.	Olympique Thun (15)	0–1	AS Château-l'Abbaye (12)
138.	FC Famars (10)	1–3	ES Bouchain (10)
139.	ES Noyelles-sur-Selle (13)	1–1 (1–3 p)	US Lieu-Saint-Amand (13)
140.	FC Annœullin (9)	0–5	Football Saint-Michel Quesnoy (10)
141.	ACS Comines (10)	2–1	FC Bauvin (11)
142.	Verlinghem Foot (9)	2–2 (6–5 p)	JA Armentières (9)
143.	FC Vieux-Berquin (11)	2–3	SR Lomme Délivrance (11)
144.	Olympic Hallennois (12)	0–2	JS Wavrin-Don (9)
145.	Toufflers AF (11)	3–0	Stade Ennevelin (12)
146.	ES Lille Louvière Pellevoisin (10)	0–2	SCO Roubaix (8)
147.	Bac-Sailly Sports (12)	1–2	AJL Caëstre (10)
148.	US Wallon-Cappel (13)	0–3	FC Nieppois (11)
149.	SM Petite-Synthe (9)	0–0 (1–3 p)	FC La Chapelle-d'Armentières (9)
150.	Crous FC Lille (13)	2–5	AS Templeuve-en-Pévèle (9)
151.	Pont Rommel Football Hazebrouckois (13)	0–5	FC Lille Sud (9)
152.	EAC Cysoing-Wannehain-Bourghelles (9)	1–0	OSM Lomme (9)
153.	Flers OS (10)	4–0	Sailly Forest Foot (11)
154.	Lille AFS Guinée (13)	1–1 (5–6 p)	FC Méteren (11)
155.	JS Ghyveldoise (10)	0–0 (5–4 p)	US Téteghem (9)
156.	EC Camphin-en-Pévèle (11)	0–1	US Fretin (9)
157.	FC Le Doulieu (11)	3–0	US Hondeghem (12)
158.	Hondschoote FC (13)	0–5	FC Linselles (10)
159.	AS Bersée (10)	5–1	US Houplin-Ancoisne (11)
160.	AC Halluin (12)	1–2	OSM Sequedin (9)
161.	Leers OF (8)	4–0	SC Grand Fort Philippe (9)
162.	FC Steene (11)	2–1	ASC Roubaix (11)
163.	US Lederzeele (12)	3–6	AG Thumeries (11)
164.	RC Herzeele (12)	0–2	FC Wambrechies (10)
165.	AS Winnezeele (12)	2–0	ASF Looberghe (12)
166.	EC Anstaing-Chéreng-Tressin-Gruson (9)	2–2 (6–5 p)	US Provin (8)
167.	FC Wahagnies (13)	3–0	FC Houtkerque (12)
168.	US Estaires (12)	2–5	Stade Lezennois (9)
169.	US Bray-Dunes (10)	1–2	AS Pitgam (11)
170.	CO Quaëdypre (10)	0–9	CG Haubourdin (9)
171.	ES Wormhout (12)	0–3	AS Baisieux Patro (8)
172.	AS Salomé (12)	1–1 (5–3 p)	AS Rexpoëde (11)
173.	ES Mouvalloise (9)	1–2	US Leffrinckoucke (9)
174.	EC Houplines (9)	11–0	US Warhem (10)
175.	UJS Cheminots de Tourcoing (13)	3–4	CS La Gorgue (8)
176.	CS Erquinghem-Lys (10)	0–3	FC Rosendaël (10)
177.	CS EIC Tourcoing (13)	8–1	USF Armbouts-Cappel (10)
178.	FA Blanc Seau (11)	1–7	Olympique Hémois (9)
179.	FC Deulemont (14)	0–8	Stella Lys (9)
180.	AAJ Uxem (10)	3–2	CS Gondecourt (11)
181.	ES Bambecque (13)	3–0	AS Jean Baptiste Roubaix (12)
182.	ASF Coudekerque (10)	0–6	Union Halluinoise (9)
183.	SC Bourbourg (10)	2–2 (7–6 p)	AS Loos Oliveaux (10)
184.	ES Ennequin-Loos (11)	5–0	US Godewaersvelde (12)
185.	RC Bois-Blancs Lille (11)	0–3	AS Albeck Grande-Synthe (10)
186.	JS Steenwerck (10)	0–3	Villeneuve-d'Ascq Métropole (8)
187.	Faches-Thumesnil FC (10)	2–0	ES Cappelloise (11)
188.	FC Bierne (11)	5–0	AS Pont de Nieppe (12)
189.	FC Templemars-Vendeville (10)	1–1 (3–4 p)	Wattrelos FC (10)
190.	FC Wattignies (10)	1–3	ES Genech (10)
191.	US Pérenchies (9)	1–2	USCC Saint-Pol-sur-Mer (9)
192.	Olympique Mérignies (12)	6–3	CS Lille (13)
193.	CS Bousbecque (10)	0–1	Fort-Mardyck OC (10)
194.	Roubaix SC (9)	3–0	US Yser (9)
195.	US Wervicquoise (12)	1–0	AS Marcq (14)
196.	AS Willems (12)	0–3	JS Lille Wazemmes (8)
197.	USM Merville (11)	6–0	ES Boeschepe (11)
198.	US Ronchin (10)	8–2	ASF Coudekerque (11)
199.	Prémesques FC (11)	2–3	US Mardyck (11)
200.	AF Deux-Synthe (13)	4–5	US Phalempin (10)
201.	FC Mons-en-Barœul (11)	0–3	RC Bergues (9)
202.	OJC Foot Saint-Jans-Cappel (13)	0–11	US Marquette (8)
203.	US Attiches (13)	0–4	AS Radinghem (10)
204.	AC Spycker (13)	3–0	ACS Hoymille (12)
205.	FC Saint-Folquin (11)	0–3	Mons AC (8)
206.	AS Balinghem (13)	1–3	JS Renescuroise (11)
207.	FC Ecques-Heuringhem (12)	0–8	FJEP Fort Vert (9)
208.	US Bomy (14)	0–6	ES Guînes (9)
209.	JS Bonningues-lès-Ardres (13)	0–3	Calais FCHF (9)
210.	JS Racquinghem (13)	0–1	FCP Blendecques (9)
211.	ES Herbelles-Pihem-Inghem (12)	1–8	CS Watten (9)
212.	US Polincove (13)	2–1	US Vaudringhem (14)
213.	FC Thiembronne (13)	0–3	RC Ardrésien (9)
214.	FC Wavrans-sur-l'Aa (10)	0–5	US Blaringhem (9)
215.	US Hardinghen (12)	0–5	FC Recques-sur-Hem (9)
216.	AS Calais (14)	2–3	US Thérouanne (12)
217.	ES Oye-Plage (10)	4–0	ES Saint-Omer Rural (10)
218.	RC Brêmes-les-Ardres (13)	0–3	CA Éperlecques (9)
219.	FC Fréthun (12)	3–6	US Quiestède (9)
220.	Amicale Balzac (12)	0–0 (4–3 p)	AS Surques-Escœuilles (10)
221.	FC Offekerque (14)	0–10	US Nielles-lès-Bléquin (9)
222.	ADF Ruminghem (15)	2–8	AS Esquerdes (12)
223.	FC Wizernes (12)	0–6	AS Nortkerque 95 (9)
224.	Entente Calais (10)	4–2	Lys Aa FC (11)
225.	FJEP Guemps (15)	1–10	FC Saint-Martin-lez-Tatinghem (11)
226.	ES Roquetoire (10)	15–0	Longuenesse Malafoot (12)
227.	AS Tournehem (10)	1–1 (4–3 p)	FC Calais Caténa (11)
228.	FC Wardrecques (10)	1–1 (5–4 p)	FC Sangatte (10)
229.	AS Saint-Tricat et Nielles (13)	0–2	ES Helfaut (12)
230.	SO Calais (11)	1–4	US Marais de Gûines (11)
231.	US Coyecques (13)	0–2	US Coulomby (13)
232.	AS Andres (14)	0–2	FC Nordausques (11)
233.	FC Calais Opale Bus (14)	0–3	ES Licques (10)
234.	FC Setques (13)	0–7	FC Campagne-lès-Guines (9)
235.	US Ambleteuse (10)	3–1	US Équihen-Plage (11)
236.	US Porteloise (13)	0–8	AS Conchil-le-Temple (9)
237.	RC Samer (11)	3–0	ASL Vieil-Moutier La Calique (12)
238.	AS Fillièvres (13)	1–2	FC Merlimont (10)
239.	USO Rinxent (10)	2–2 (3–4 p)	Verton FC (9)
240.	AS Colembert (12)	0–0 (4–5 p)	US Bourthes (9)
241.	AS Alciaquoise (11)	2–2 (5–4 p)	AS Campagne-lès-Hesdin (9)
242.	FC Senlecques (14)	1–2	Le Portel GPF (13)
243.	AS Fruges (11)	2–2 (2–3 p)	US Elinghen-Ferques (12)
244.	USM Boulogne-sur-Mer (14)	0–10	CO Wimille (10)
245.	AS Crémarest (12)	0–3	AF Étaples Haute Ville (9)
246.	Gouy-Saint-André RC (11)	2–1	US Frencq (12)
247.	AL Camiers (11)	0–3	US Montreuil (9)
248.	US Conteville Wierre-Effroy (12)	1–6	AS Berck (9)
249.	FC Conti (14)	2–0	US Landrethun-le-Nord (10)
250.	US Rety (14)	1–6	US Créquy-Planquette (11)
251.	Éclair Neufchâtel-Hardelot (9)	1–2	ESL Boulogne-sur-Mer (9)
252.	AC Verte Vallée (15)	1–4	FC Capellois (11)
253.	US Marquise (10)	4–0	Union Saint-Loupoise (11)
254.	FC Wissant (13)	0–11	US Attin (9)
255.	US Verchocq-Ergny-Herly (11)	1–4	JS Desvroise (9)
256.	AS Wimereux (10)	4–2	AS Bezinghem (10)
257.	JS Condette (10)	6–0	US Hesdin-l'Abbé (11)
258.	AC Tubersent (14)	2–6	CAP Le Portel (11)
259.	FC Isques (12)	0–1	ES Saint-Léonard (9)
260.	RC Lottinghem (15)	0–3	RC Bréquerecque Ostrohove (10)
261.	Fraternelle des Cheminots de Laon (13)	6–5	US Villers-Cotterêts (12)
262.	SC Origny-en-Thiérache (9)	4–3	AS Beaurevoir (10)
263.	CS Aubenton (11)	0–3	US Sissonne (10)
264.	ES Sequehart Levergies (12)	1–3	FC Lehaucourt (11)
265.	ALJN Sinceny (12)	3–1	FC Courmelles (12)
266.	ES Bucilly-Landouzy-Éparcy (13)	5–2	Dizy-le-Gros FC (13)
267.	US des Vallées (9)	3–0	AS Neuilly-Saint-Front (10)
268.	US Chemin des Dames (11)	2–2 (3–1 p)	ASA Presles (10)
269.	FFC Chéry-lès-Pouilly (10)	1–4	Marle Sports (10)
270.	UA Fère-en-Tardenois (11)	3–8	IEC Château-Thierry (9)
271.	US Acy (12)	2–5	US Guignicourt (10)
272.	FC Hannapes (11)	2–1	FC Fresnoy Fonsomme (10)
273.	FC Amigny-Rouy (13)	1–5	FC Vierzy (10)
274.	US Vadencourt (10)	1–2	Gauchy-Grugies Saint-Quentin FC (9)
275.	AS Faverolles Dampleux Fleury (11)	3–2	AS Pavant (12)
276.	ES Viry-Noureuil (11)	6–1	FC Travecy (12)
277.	Espoir Sains-Richaumont (11)	1–0	ESUS Buironfosse-La Capelle (9)
278.	US Bruyères-et-Montbérault (9)	3–2	FC Moncelien (10)
279.	FC Fontainois (12)	3–6	FC Watigny (10)
280.	ES Ognes (11)	2–7	AFC Holnon-Fayet (9)
281.	AS Barenton-Bugny (12)	1–1 (3–4 p)	Coveronnais SC (13)
282.	SC Montaigu (12)	1–3	ES Clacy-Mons (10)
283.	AS Tupigny (13)	– (Note: FC Lesdins penalised for fielding an ineligible player. AS Tupigny qualify. Original scoreline unknown.)	FC Lesdins (10)
284.	FC Saint-Martin Étreillers (11)	1–3	US Guise (9)
285.	ASPTT Laon (11)	1–1 (2–3 p)	US Brissy-Hamégicourt (11)
286.	FC Gandelu-Dammard (12)	5–3	ACSF Vic-sur-Aisne (11)
287.	US Origny-Thenelles (11)	5–0	US Étreaupont (12)
288.	Olympique Gricourt (13)	0–3	Harly Quentin (9)
289.	AS Brunehamel (12)	0–3	ASC Saint-Michel (10)
290.	Voyenne AC (13)	1–0	Chambry FC (12)
291.	La Concorde de Bucy-les-Pierrepont (11)	0–5	ICS Créçois (9)
292.	US La Fère (12)	3–2	UES Vermand (10)
293.	FC Abbecourt (11)	0–1	US Crépy Vivaise (9)
294.	FC Vaux-Andigny (13)	5–1	SC Fontaine-Notre-Dame (12)
295.	Entente Crouy-Cuffies (9)	6–0	Union Sud Aisne FC (10)
296.	FC Bucy-le-Long (11)	2–4	FC 3 Châteaux (9)
297.	FJEP Coincy (11)	2–2 (4–5 p)	AS Milonaise (11)
298.	CS Blérancourt (12)	0–0 (4–3 p)	US Vallée de l'Ailette (13)
299.	US Rozoy-sur-Serre (13)	3–0	AS Martigny (12)
300.	BCV FC (9)	8–1	AFC Belleu (12)
301.	NES Boué-Étreux (11)	1–2	Étaves-et-Bocquiaux FC (12)
302.	FC Clastrois (13)	5–1	CS Montescourt-Lizerolles (12)
303.	US Anizy Pinon (13)	3–2	AS Venizel-Billy (10)
304.	US Aulnois-sous-Laon (10)	2–1	ES Montcornet (9)
305.	AS Nouvionnaise (12)	0–6	US Seboncourt (10)
306.	US Attichy (13)	0–9	Hermes-Berthecourt AC (10)
307.	FC Generation-Espoir Clos des Roses Compiègne (12)	2–2 (3–5 p)	US Crépy-en-Valois (10)
308.	AS Auger-Saint-Vincent (13)	0–6	AS Verneuil-en-Halatte (9)
309.	US Baugy Monchy Humières (10)	3–5	AS La Neuville-sur-Oudeuil (10)
310.	FC Clairoix (10)	1–1 (4–1 p)	ASPTT Beauvais (9)
311.	AS Monchy-Saint-Éloi (13)	3–8	FC Cauffry (10)
312.	ÉC Villers/Bailleul (12)	0–6	AS Verderel-lès-Sauqueuse (11)
313.	CS Haudivillers (11)	1–1 (4–2 p)	AS Allonne (9)
314.	OC Bury (12)	0–3	US Lieuvillers (10)
315.	RC Précy (11)	1–1 (5–4 p)	Stade Ressontois (9)
316.	AS Noyers-Saint-Martin (11)	1–5	Grandvilliers AC (9)
317.	AS Hénonville (11)	1–5	US Meru Sandricourt (8)
318.	US Machemont (13)	0–3	FC Tillé (12)
319.	JS Thieux (11)	2–0	CS Avilly-Saint-Léonard (9)
320.	AS Rochy-Condé (13)	0–3	FR Les Ageux (11)
321.	US Paillart (11)	3–4	AS Saint-Remy-en-l'Eau (12)
322.	ES Formerie (11)	1–0	US Lassigny (9)
323.	FC Saint-Paul (11)	1–2	FC Carlepont (11)
324.	US Marseille-en-Beauvaisis (10)	2–3	AJ Laboissière-en-Thelle (9)
325.	US Crèvecœur-le-Grand (10)	1–2 (3–4 p)	Canly FC (10)
326.	AS Auneuil (10)	1–6	US Cires-lès-Mello (9)
327.	US Étouy-Agnetz (10)	0–1	US Lamorlaye (9)
328.	AS Plailly (10)	5–1	SC Lamotte Breuil (10)
329.	AS Laversines (12)	0–5	ES Ormoy-Duvy (9)
330.	JSA Compiègne-La Croix-Saint Ouen (10)	1–0	AS Orry-La-Chapelle (10)
331.	US Froissy (11)	0–6	US Bresloise (9)
332.	Fleury SL (13)	2–2 (4–2 p)	ES Remy (10)
333.	AS Maignelay-Montigny (12)	0–1	AS Multien (9)
334.	FC Saint-Omer-en-Chaussée (13)	0–5	AS Ons-en-Bray (10)
335.	US Saint-Germer-de-Fly (11)	1–2	AS Saint-Sauveur (Oise) (9)
336.	SCC Sérifontaine (11)	1–2	EFC Dieudonné Puiseux (10)
337.	RC Blargies (12)	0–7	AS Mareuil-sur-Ourcq (11)
338.	AS La Neuville-en-Hez (12)	4–0 (Note: AS La Neuville-en-Hez penalised for fielding an ineligible player. US Breuil-le-Sec qualify.)	US Breuil-le-Sec (10)
339.	AS Silly-le-Long (10)	3–5	FC Ruraville (11)
340.	SC Les Marettes (13)	0–5	AS Tracy-le-Mont (11)
341.	FC Coudray (13)	1–6	AS Coye-la-Forêt (11)
342.	FC Angy (11)	1–1 (3–1 p)	SC Songeons (9)
343.	US Sainte-Geneviève (10)	2–1	ASC Val d'Automne (10)
344.	RC Creil Agglo (13)	14–1	FC Golancourt (13)
345.	FC Boran (11)	1–1 (5–4 p)	FC Saint-Just des Marais (12)
346.	AS Cheminots Chambly (13)	2–1	JS Bulles (12)
347.	AS Laigneville (12)	2–4	CA Venette (10)
348.	AS Montmacq (12)	0–3	AS Noailles-Cauvigny (10)
349.	USR Saint-Crépin-Ibouvillers (10)	0–0 (4–3 p)	Tricot OS (10)
350.	US Andeville (11)	0–1	FC Esches Fosseuse (12)
351.	FCJ Noyon (11)	2–2 (4–1 p)	US Ribécourt (9)
352.	US Verberie (11)	1–1 (3–1 p)	JS Guiscard (11)
353.	AS Bornel (11)	2–2 (5–6 p)	FC Sacy-Saint Martin (12)
354.	AS Pontpoint (11)	0–0 (4–3 p)	FC Fontainettes Saint-Aubin (10)
355.	Rollot AC (12)	3–0	Amicale Fleury Trie Château (12)
356.	FC Nointel (12)	0–3 (Note: Match abandoned after 87 minutes. Under review by the disciplinary committee. FC Nointel penalised, US Plessis-Brion qualify.)	US Plessis-Brion (9)
357.	ES Compiègne (11)	2–0	ESC Wavignies (11)
358.	SSEP Martainneville (13)	5–0	AS Hautvillers-Ouville (12)
359.	JS Cambron (11)	1–1 (1–3 p)	FC Saint-Valéry Baie de Somme Sud (9)
360.	AS Long (14)	4–1	AS Vismes au Val (12)
361.	Olympique Eaucourtois (12)	4–1	Entente Sailly-Flibeaucourt Le Titre (12)
362.	AS Quesnoy-le-Montant (14)	2–1	AC Mers (11)
363.	US Bouillancourt-en-Sery (12)	1–2	ES Harondel (10)
364.	AS Arrest (12)	2–6	Avenir Nouvion-en-Ponthieu (11)
365.	FR Millencourt-en-Ponthieu (12)	1–4	ASIC Bouttencourt (11)
366.	FC Grand-Laviers (12)	0–0 (5–3 p)	Avenir Croisien (12)
367.	SC Cayolais (14)	0–3	US Lignières-Châtelain (10)
368.	USC Portugais Saint-Ouen (12)	0–2	FC Oisemont (10)
369.	AS Woincourt Dargnies (12)	1–8	ABC2F Candas (11)
370.	US Quend (11)	0–0 (3–5 p)	AS Valines (10)
371.	AS Namps-Maisnil (12)	2–2 (7–8 p)	Football Dreuillois (11)
372.	Avenir de l'Étoile (12)	0–1	US Neuilly-l'Hôpital (12)
373.	RC Doullens (9)	4–1	SC Flixecourt (9)
374.	AS Maisnières (13)	0–9	AS Airaines-Allery (9)
375.	AS Picquigny (13)	2–4	AS Menchecourt-Thuison-La Bouvaque (11)
376.	AS Huppy (12)	1–3	FC Rue-Le Crotoy (11)
377.	US Le Boisle (14)	3–2	US Vron (13)
378.	Association Longpré-Long-Condé (12)	1–9	Auxiloise (9)
379.	SEP Blangy-Bouttencourt (11)	1–1 (4–5 p)	FC Mareuil-Caubert (10)
380.	CS Crécy-en-Ponthieu (10)	2–2 (5–3 p)	US Béthencourt-sur-Mer (10)
381.	ES Chépy (12)	0–0 (4–3 p)	Poix-Blangy-Croixrault FC (10)
382.	SC Templiers Oisemont (10)	0–2	US Nibas Fressenneville (10)
383.	AC Hallencourt (11)	1–3	SC Pont-Remy (10)
384.	CO Woignarue (11)	2–2 (7–8 p)	AS Saint-Sauveur 80 (10)
385.	AS Davenescourt (12)	3–8	FC Blangy-Tronville (11)
386.	FC Méaulte (10)	1–2	CS Amiens Montières Étouvie (9)
387.	AS Rethonvillers Biarre Marché (13)	2–4	Olympique Amiénois (10)
388.	ASM Rivery (12)	0–1	Boves SC (12)
389.	FC Pont de Metz (13)	0–0 (0–3 p)	ASFR Ribemont Mericourt (11)
390.	Olympique Monchy-Lagache (12)	0–7	Olympique Le Hamel (9)
391.	ES Sainte-Emilie/Épehy-le-Ronss (12)	6–0	US Roisel (12)
392.	US Esmery-Hallon (13)	1–0	ES Sains/Saint-Fuscien (11)
393.	US Corbie (9)	10–0	AS Maurepas-Combles (13)
394.	USC Moislains (13)	0–3	AS Querrieu (10)
395.	US Marcelcave (12)	0–1	FC Estrées-Mons (11)
396.	AS Prouzel-Plachy (13)	0–2	US Voyennes (13)
397.	US Ham (10)	1–2	US Ouvriere Albert (9)
398.	US Méricourt l'Abbé (12)	3–2	ES Roye-Damery (11)
399.	RC Salouël (10)	3–1	Conty Lœuilly SC (9)
400.	SC Fouilloy (14)	0–4	US Flesselles (10)
401.	FC Dompierre-Becquincourt (14)	1–6	US Daours Vecquemont Bussy Aubigny (10)
402.	Rumigny FC (13)	1–1 (5–4 p)	US Marchélepot (11)
403.	FC Plessier (12)	1–4	AS Glisy (9)
404.	ES Cagny (11)	3–1	FR Englebelmer (10)
405.	ES Licourt (13)	0–2 (Note: US Sailly-Saillisel penalised for fielding too many transferred players. ES Licourt qualify.)	US Sailly-Saillisel (11)
406.	US Cartigny-Buire (12)	0–5	US Rosières (10)
407.	ASL Saveuse (13)	1–4	Fraternelle Ailly-sur-Noye (10)
408.	Association Cardonnette Football (13)	0–2	AF Amiens (12)
409.	ES Vers-sur-Selle (13)	0–0 (3–2 p)	AS Cerisy (11)

=== Second round ===
These matches were played on 4 and 5 September 2021, with one postponed until 12 September 2021.

Second round results: Hauts-de-France
Tie no	Home team (tier)	Score	Away team (tier)
1.	SC Pont-Remy (10)	1–3	SC Abbeville (6)
2.	FC Capellois (11)	1–3	Stade Portelois (6)
3.	US Thérouanne (12)	0–4	Olympique Saint-Martin Boulogne (8)
4.	JS Renescuroise (11)	0–3	ES Saint-Léonard (9)
5.	FC Wardrecques (10)	0–6	ES Calaisis Coulogne (8)
6.	AS Tournehem (10)	0–12	US Blériot-Plage (7)
7.	ES Helfaut (12)	0–1	US Elinghen-Ferques (12)
8.	US Polincove (13)	0–6	US Bourthes (9)
9.	AS Rang-du-Fliers (11)	0–12	AS Étaples (7)
10.	CO Wimille (10)	2–3	US Attin (9)
11.	ES Licques (10)	1–1 (5–6 p)	ES Arques (8)
12.	US Montreuil (9)	1–0	Entente Calais (10)
13.	US Marais de Gûines (11)	1–3	RC Ardrésien (9)
14.	US Alquines (11)	0–3	CA Éperlecques (9)
15.	US Coulomby (13)	0–3	AF Étaples Haute Ville (9)
16.	Amicale Pont-de-Briques (11)	1–6	AS Audruicq (8)
17.	AS Esquerdes (12)	1–8	AS Nortkerque 95 (9)
18.	AS Saint-Martin-au-Laërt (11)	3–0	Amicale Balzac (12)
19.	FCP Blendecques (9)	0–4	JS Longuenesse (8)
20.	Le Portel GPF (13)	1–2	Olympique Hesdin-Marconne (8)
21.	CAP Le Portel (11)	0–9	Olympique Lumbrois (6)
22.	US Blaringhem (9)	4–1	US Ambleteuse (10)
23.	JS Condette (10)	2–3	AS Wimereux (10)
24.	AS Berck (9)	4–2	ES Beaurainville (10)
25.	US Créquy-Planquette (11)	8–0	ES Mametz (10)
26.	RC Bréquerecque Ostrohove (10)	2–0	ES Roquetoire (10)
27.	FC Conti (14)	1–2	ES Guînes (9)
28.	FC Campagne-lès-Guines (9)	3–0	US Dannes (10)
29.	AS Conchil-le-Temple (9)	1–0	SC Coquelles (7)
30.	FJEP Fort Vert (9)	1–3	Grand Calais Pascal FC (7)
31.	ES Oye-Plage (10)	0–7	AS Marck (6)
32.	Bonningues-lès-Calais (15)	1–1 (4–3 p)	FC Nordausques (11)
33.	Nieurlet SL (14)	1–8	Verton FC (9)
34.	JS Desvroise (9)	1–1 (6–7 p)	US Quiestède (9)
35.	FC Recques-sur-Hem (9)	1–0	ES Enquin-les-Mines (8)
36.	Gouy-Saint-André RC (11)	0–6	US Nielles-lès-Bléquin (9)
37.	US Saint-Quentin-Bléssy (9)	1–2	AS Cucq (8)
38.	CS Watten (9)	0–1	US Marquise (10)
39.	Auchy-lès-Hesdin (11)	1–7	Calais Beau-Marais (8)
40.	ESL Boulogne-sur-Mer (9)	4–1	FC Merlimont (10)
41.	FLC Longfossé (10)	8–1	RC Samer (11)
42.	Calais FCHF (9)	0–0 (3–4 p)	AS Outreau (6)
43.	ASG Louvroil (9)	3–1	AS Douzies (8)
44.	AS Recquignies (12)	1–3	ES Boussois (10)
45.	SCEPS Pont-sur-Sambre (12)	0–6	Sports Podéens Réunis (9)
46.	US Villers-Sire-Nicole (14)	2–2 (3–0 p)	US Beaufort/Limont-Fontaine (12)
47.	US Villers-Pol (12)	2–3	US Rousies (10)
48.	AFC Ferrière-la-Petite (12)	4–2	AS Dompierre (13)
49.	US Gommegnies-Carnoy (10)	1–2	IC Ferrière-la-Grande (9)
50.	CA Sainsois (13)	1–6	Maubeuge FCCA (11)
51.	US Fourmies (8)	2–0	SA Le Quesnoy (9)
52.	US Berlaimont (9)	3–2	FC Avesnes-sur-Helpe (7)
53.	US Bavay (8)	3–2	AS Hautmont (8)
54.	FC Aunelle (12)	0–6	Olympique Maroilles (10)
55.	AS Bellignies (14)	0–9	FC Marpent (7)
56.	FC Jenlain (13)	1–12	US Jeumont (9)
57.	SC Le Cateau (12)	17–1	SC Osartis-Marquion (13)
58.	Entente Ligny/Olympique Caullery (10)	0–4	CAS Escaudœuvres (6)
59.	ES Paillencourt-Estrun (10)	3–0	US Viesly (11)
60.	US Les Rues-des-Vignes (13)	0–1	OM Cambrai Amérique (9)
61.	US Saint-Souplet (10)	1–3	FC Cambrai-Saint Roch (11)
62.	US Fontaine-Notre-Dame (11)	2–4	US Walincourt-Selvigny (9)
63.	OC Avesnois (13)	0–6	ES Caudry (9)
64.	US Saint-Aubert (9)	0–3	ES Villers-Outréaux (8)
65.	Olympique Saint-Ollois (12)	0–2	US Quievy (11)
66.	FC Solesmes (11)	5–1 (Note: match abandoned by the referee after 41 minutes of the second half due to the actions of some of the ES Crespin players. ES Crespin penalised. FC Solesmes qualify.)	ES Crespin (10)
67.	FC Provillois (9)	1–1 (5–4 p)	AS Masnières (9)
68.	FC Estrées (14)	3–6	FC Férin (10)
69.	US Corbehem (11)	1–9	ES Lambresienne (6)
70.	FC Masny (9)	4–5	AS Beuvry-la-Forêt (7)
71.	US Pecquencourt (12)	0–3	Stade Orchésien (9)
72.	Olympique Senséen (9)	4–2	SC Guesnain (8)
73.	AS Sin-le-Noble (10)	2–6	US Mineurs Waziers (7)
74.	FC Écaillon (14)	0–7	US Erre-Hornaing (9)
75.	US Loffre-Erchin (14)	0–3	SC Douai (7)
76.	AS Cuincy (11)	1–2	SC Aniche (8)
77.	FC Pecquencourt (13)	1–3	AEF Leforest (8)
78.	US Aubygeoise (12)	4–2	Olympique Flinois (9)
79.	AS Coutiches (13)	0–1	USAC Somain (10)
80.	UF Anhiers (11)	1–1 (1–4 p)	Olympique Landasien (12)
81.	RC Lécluse (14)	0–2	ESM Hamel (10)
82.	AS Château-l'Abbaye (12)	0–1	Anzin FARC (10)
83.	FC Haspres (15)	1–7	Douchy FC (11)
84.	RC Rœulx (13)	1–1 (0–3 p)	Maing FC (9)
85.	AS Artres (12)	0–8	IC La Sentinelle (7)
86.	USM Marly (9)	5–3	ES Bouchain (10)
87.	Olympique Onnaingeois (10)	0–6	Saint-Amand FC (6)
88.	AS Summer Club Valenciennes (10)	1–3	US Escaudain (7)
89.	FC Quarouble (9)	2–3	FC Les Epis (9)
90.	US Haulchin (12)	1–1 (4–5 p)	FC Saultain (12)
91.	SC Lourches (12)	0–0 (4–2 p)	Bruay Sports (8)
92.	Saint-Saulve Football (9)	0–1	US Aulnoy (9)
93.	Hérin-Aubry CLE (14)	1–1 (5–6 p)	US Quiévrechain (14)
94.	US Lieu-Saint-Amand (13)	0–0 (4–3 p)	FC Lecelles-Rosult (10)
95.	FC Dutemple (8)	5–1	JO Wallers-Arenberg (9)
96.	CO Trith-Saint-Léger (10)	1–4	FC Raismes (7)
97.	AG Solrézienne (9)	0–1	US Hordain (8)
98.	CS Blérancourt (12)	0–2	US Bruyères-et-Montbérault (9)
99.	Coveronnais SC (13)	2–6	FC Vierzy (10)
100.	FC Watigny (10)	1–4	RC Bohain (8)
101.	AS Faverolles Dampleux Fleury (11)	0–4	AFC Holnon-Fayet (9)
102.	US Seboncourt (10)	3–3 (5–3 p)	Stade Portugais Saint-Quentin (7)
103.	US Rozoy-sur-Serre (13)	0–7	US Ribemont Mezieres FC (7)
104.	ES Viry-Noureuil (11)	2–4	US Prémontré Saint-Gobain (9)
105.	AS Milonaise (11)	1–2	ALJN Sinceny (12)
106.	FC Vaux-Andigny (13)	1–3	SC Origny-en-Thiérache (9)
107.	Entente Crouy-Cuffies (9)	1–1 (0–3 p)	FC Essigny-le-Grand (9)
108.	Espoir Sains-Richaumont (11)	0–1	US Aulnois-sous-Laon (10)
109.	FC Clastrois (13)	0–3	SAS Moy de l'Aisne (8)
110.	ES Bucilly-Landouzy-Éparcy (13)	0–5	FC Hannapes (11)
111.	US Anizy Pinon (13)	1–4	Château Thierry-Etampes FC (8)
112.	Fraternelle des Cheminots de Laon (13)	0–3 (Note: Tie won by means of forfeit.)	ES Clacy-Mons (10)
113.	US Brissy-Hamégicourt (11)	0–3	FC 3 Châteaux (9)
114.	Étaves-et-Bocquiaux FC (12)	2–0	L'Arsenal Club Achery-Beautor-Charmes (8)
115.	US des Vallées (9)	1–7	CS Villeneuve Saint-Germain (8)
116.	US La Fère (12)	2–2 (5–3 p)	US Crépy Vivaise (9)
117.	FC Lehaucourt (11)	1–9	Gauchy-Grugies Saint-Quentin FC (9)
118.	US Guignicourt (10)	1–3	Septmonts OC (9)
119.	US Athies-sous-Laon (9)	0–3	BCV FC (9)
120.	AS Tupigny (13)	0–8	Internationale Soissonnaise (7)
121.	FC Gandelu-Dammard (12)	1–5	US Laon (6)
122.	US Chemin des Dames (11)	1–11	Écureuils Itancourt-Neuville (6)
123.	Voyenne AC (13)	0–15	US Vervins (8)
124.	US Origny-Thenelles (11)	1–6	Le Nouvion AC (9)
125.	ASC Saint-Michel (10)	0–0 (4–5 p)	Harly Quentin (9)
126.	US Sissonne (10)	1–2	Tergnier FC (8)
127.	Marle Sports (10)	1–3	US Guise (9)
128.	IEC Château-Thierry (9)	0–3	US Chauny (6)
129.	ICS Créçois (9)	1–2	US Buire-Hirson-Thiérache (8)
130.	FCJ Noyon (11)	0–0 (0–3 p)	US Villers-Saint-Paul (8)
131.	FR Les Ageux (11)	3–2	AS Coye-la-Forêt (11)
132.	AS Pontpoint (11)	0–8	US Breteuil (7)
133.	AS Tracy-le-Mont (11)	3–0	AS Saint-Sauveur (Oise) (9)
134.	US Breuil-le-Sec (10)	0–4 (Note: US Nogent penalised for fielding a suspended player. US Breuil-le-Sec qualify.)	US Nogent (7)
135.	AS Saint-Remy-en-l'Eau (12)	1–4	AS La Neuville-sur-Oudeuil (10)
136.	FC Sacy-Saint Martin (12)	0–3	FC Béthisy (8)
137.	Fleury SL (13)	1–3	JS Thieux (11)
138.	AS Plailly (10)	1–3	SC Saint-Just-en-Chaussée (8)
139.	FC Boran (11)	2–2 (5–4 p)	FC Clairoix (10)
140.	AS Verneuil-en-Halatte (9)	0–0 (3–4 p)	US Balagny-Saint-Epin (7)
141.	FC Tillé (12)	1–3	AS Cheminots Chambly (13)
142.	US Cires-lès-Mello (9)	0–4	US Pont Sainte-Maxence (7)
143.	USR Saint-Crépin-Ibouvillers (10)	2–2 (4–5 p)	AFC Creil (8)
144.	CS Haudivillers (11)	1–2	CA Venette (10)
145.	US Lieuvillers (10)	0–0 (4–3 p)	FC Longueil-Annel (8)
146.	AS Multien (9)	2–1	USE Saint-Leu d'Esserent (8)
147.	EFC Dieudonné Puiseux (10)	1–3	ES Ormoy-Duvy (9)
148.	AJ Laboissière-en-Thelle (9)	1–2	USM Senlisienne (6)
149.	US Verberie (11)	0–3	US Choisy-au-Bac (6)
150.	US Plessis-Brion (9)	1–2	US Saint-Maximin (7)
151.	US Bresloise (9)	0–2	US Gouvieux (7)
152.	FC Angy' (11)	3–1	AS Verderel-lès-Sauqueuse (11)
153.	US Margny-lès-Compiègne (8)	2–1	US Le Pays du Valois (6)
154.	Rollot AC (12)	3–2	ES Formerie (11)
155.	Grandvilliers AC (9)	1–2	FC Liancourt-Clermont (8)
156.	AS Mareuil-sur-Ourcq (11)	0–9	CS Chaumont-en-Vexin (6)
157.	RC Précy (11)	2–1	US Estrées-Saint-Denis (8)
158.	ES Compiègne (11)	0–13	AFC Compiègne (6)
159.	FC Carlepont (11)	0–4	FC Esches Fosseuse (12)
160.	US Lamorlaye (9)	3–3 (6–5 p)	Standard FC Montataire (8)
161.	AS Noailles-Cauvigny (10)	2–1	Canly FC (10)
162.	AS Ons-en-Bray (10)	1–1 (5–4 p)	Hermes-Berthecourt AC (10)
163.	US Sainte-Geneviève(10)	0–5	US Chevrières-Grandfresnoy (7)
164.	JSA Compiègne-La Croix-Saint Ouen (10)	4–1	FC Ruraville (11)
165.	FC Cauffry (10)	2–2 (0–3 p)	US Crépy-en-Valois (10)
166.	RC Creil Agglo (13)	1–5	US Meru Sandricourt (8)
167.	ES Genech (10)	1–0	US Phalempin (10)
168.	AJL Caëstre (10)	1–5	US Ronchin (10)
169.	AS Albeck Grande-Synthe (10)	0–9	US Gravelines (6)
170.	JS Ghyveldoise (10)	1–4	ES Roncq (8)
171.	SC Bourbourg (10)	0–5	US Wattrelos (7)
172.	Flers OS (10)	2–0	AS Bersée (10)
173.	FC Linselles (10)	0–2	EC Houplines (9)
174.	FC Nieppois (11)	3–4	USM Merville (11)
175.	ES Bambecque (13)	1–8	SCO Roubaix (8)
176.	FC Méteren (11)	2–1	Toufflers AF (11)
177.	FC Rosendaël (10)	0–3	AO Sainghinoise (8)
178.	FC Bierne (11)	0–3	FC Seclin (7)
179.	ACS Comines (10)	1–3	FC Madeleinois (8)
180.	AC Spycker (13)	0–9	AS Steenvorde (6)
181.	Olympique Hémois (9)	1–5	US Saint-André (6)
182.	FC Wambrechies (10)	0–5	FC Loon-Plage (6)
183.	Wattrelos FC (10)	1–2	US Marquette (8)
184.	JS Lille Wazemmes (8)	2–4	FC Santes (7)
185.	FA Neuvilloise (8)	1–1 (4–3 p)	US Lesquin (6)
186.	AAJ Uxem (10)	1–8	CS La Gorgue (8)
187.	FC Wahagnies (13)	0–3	Olympique Grande-Synthe (6)
188.	FC Dunkerque-Malo Plage (7)	5–2	ASC Hazebrouck (8)
189.	AS Winnezeele (12)	0–6	Villeneuve-d'Ascq Métropole (8)
190.	AG Thumeries (11)	1–5	SC Bailleulois (8)
191.	FC Lille Sud (9)	4–1	Fort-Mardyck OC (10)
192.	AS Baisieux Patro (8)	0–0 (4–5 p)	UF Lambersart (7)
193.	CS EIC Tourcoing (13)	1–2	Stella Lys (9)
194.	Union Halluinoise (9)	2–2 (1–3 p)	EC Anstaing-Chéreng-Tressin-Gruson (9)
195.	CG Haubourdin (9)	2–0	AS Radinghem (10)
196.	SR Lomme Délivrance (11)	2–6	Roubaix SC (9)
197.	JS Wavrin-Don (9)	1–3	US Leffrinckoucke (9)
198.	Football Saint-Michel Quesnoy (10)	0–1	OS Fives (7)
199.	USCC Saint-Pol-sur-Mer (9)	6–2	Faches-Thumesnil FC (10)
200.	AS Pitgam (11)	0–2	Verlinghem Foot (9)
201.	US Fretin (9)	0–1	US Pays de Cassel (6)
202.	US Lille Moulins Carrel (8)	1–2	SC Hazebrouck (6)
203.	AS Dunkerque Sud (8)	2–0	OC Roubaisien (8)
204.	US Wervicquoise (12)	0–0 (8–9 p)	AS Salomé (12)
205.	FC La Chapelle-d'Armentières (9)	1–3	ES Weppes (8)
206.	OSM Sequedin (9)	3–2	AS Hellemmes (8)
207.	RC Bergues (9)	0–3	US Tourcoing FC (6)
208.	FC Le Doulieu (11)	2–4	ES Ennequin-Loos (11)
209.	Stade Lezennois (9)	1–2	US Portugais Roubaix Tourcoing (7)
210.	Leers OF (8)	2–3	FC Bondues (7)
211.	Mons AC (8)	1–0	US Ascq (7)
212.	FC Steene (11)	0–3	US Esquelbecq (7)
213.	Olympique Mérignies (12)	3–2	US Mardyck (11)
214.	AS Long (14)	4–2	US Le Boisle (14)
215.	US Abbeville (8)	0–1	FC Ailly-sur-Somme Samara (8)
216.	ES Chépy (12)	1–1 (0–3 p)	AS Airaines-Allery (9)
217.	AS Menchecourt-Thuison-La Bouvaque (11)	3–1	FC Grand-Laviers (12)
218.	US Nibas Fressenneville (10)	0–4	ES Pigeonnier Amiens (8)
219.	US Lignières-Châtelain (10)	2–3	AS Valines (10)
220.	AS Quesnoy-le-Montant (14)	0–5	US Flesselles (10)
221.	ES Deux Vallées (9)	1–1 (1–3 p)	US Friville-Escarbotin (8)
222.	US Neuilly-l'Hôpital (12)	0–4	FC Centuloise (8)
223.	Avenir Nouvion-en-Ponthieu (11)	1–1 (4–3 p)	CS Crécy-en-Ponthieu (10)
224.	ASIC Bouttencourt (11)	3–0	FC Rue-Le Crotoy (11)
225.	SSEP Martainneville (13)	1–8	FC Saint-Valéry Baie de Somme Sud (9)
226.	FC Mareuil-Caubert (10)	4–4 (2–3 p)	Auxiloise (9)
227.	CS Amiens Montières Étouvie (9)	1–0	JS Miannay-Moyenneville-Lambercourt (7)
228.	Olympique Eaucourtois (12)	0–7	AS Gamaches (7)
229.	ES Harondel (10)	1–7	FC Oisemont (10)
230.	Rumigny FC (13)	1–6	AS Glisy (9)
231.	FC Blangy-Tronville (11)	0–11	FC Porto Portugais Amiens (7)
232.	ASFR Ribemont Mericourt (11)	0–5	US Roye-Noyon (6)
233.	Entente CAFC Péronne (8)	0–5	ESC Longueau (6)
234.	ES Sainte-Emilie/Épehy-le-Ronss (12)	3–1	Olympique Amiénois (10)
235.	AF Amiens (12)	4–2	ABC2F Candas (11)
236.	RC Salouël (10)	0–1 (Note: SC Moreuil penalised for fielding a substitute who did not appear on the submitted team sheet. RC Salouël qualify.)	SC Moreuil (8)
237.	US Voyennes (13)	2–3	FC Estrées-Mons (11)
238.	Boves SC (12)	0–0 (4–3 p)	US Daours Vecquemont Bussy Aubigny (10)
239.	US Esmery-Hallon (13)	3–3 (3–0 p)	Football Dreuillois (11)
240.	Amiens RIF (9)	2–2 (3–1 p)	AAE Chaulnes (8)
241.	US Méricourt l'Abbé (12)	1–7	RC Amiens (8)
242.	ES Cagny (11)	2–0	RC Doullens (9)
243.	Montdidier AC (8)	2–1	AS du Pays Neslois (7)
244.	ES Vers-sur-Selle (13)	1–3	AS Querrieu (10)
245.	Olympique Le Hamel (9)	1–2	US Camon (6)
246.	FC La Montoye (8)	4–1	AS Villers-Bretonneux (9)
247.	US Rosières (10)	3–0	AS Saint-Sauveur 80 (10)
248.	US Corbie (9)	0–0 (2–4 p)	US Ouvriere Albert (9)
249.	US Ruch Carvin (11)	1–1 (3–4 p)	AFCL Liebaut (8)
250.	JF Mazingarbe (12)	1–5	FC Bouvigny-Boyeffles (9)
251.	US Rouvroy (9)	0–5	Arras FA (6)
252.	AS Sailly-Labourse (11)	0–1	AS Courrièroise (11)
253.	Diables Rouges Lambres-lez-Aire (15)	2–14	FC Annay (11)
254.	AOSC Sallaumines (13)	2–4	FC Lillers (11)
255.	AS Kennedy Hénin-Beaumont (15)	3–0	US Rivière (12)
256.	Olympique Vendin (12)	4–1	AG Grenay (9)
257.	AJ Artois (11)	1–4	US Vermelles (7)
258.	USA Liévin (9)	2–4	AS Sainte-Barbe-Oignies (7)
259.	USO Drocourt (10)	5–0	OS Annequin (9)
260.	FC Cuinchy (15)	0–1	CS Pernes (13)
261.	Intrépides Norrent-Fontes (12)	2–4	SC Saint-Nicolas-lez-Arras (8)
262.	US Boubers-Conchy (13)	3–4	RC Sains (12)
263.	ES Anzin-Saint-Aubin (9)	0–0 (4–3 p)	US Nœux-les-Mines (6)
264.	Olympique La Comté Omnisport (15)	0–9	CSAL Souchez (12)
265.	JS Écourt-Saint-Quentin (8)	1–0	Espérance Calonne Liévin (9)
266.	RC Locon 2000 (13)	0–4	Auchel FC (9)
267.	CS Habarcq (12)	2–8	US Biachoise (7)
268.	CS Avion (6)	1–1 (4–1 p) (Note: Tie reversed from original draw.)	USO Lens (9)
269.	ES Saulty (12)	2–5	COS Marles-Lozinghem (9)
270.	Carabiniers Billy-Montigny (8)	9–0	SC Artésien (9)
271.	AS Beaurains (10)	0–4	RC Labourse (9)
272.	ESD Isbergues (8)	3–0	ES Saint-Laurent-Blangy (9)
273.	USO Meurchin (10)	0–2	ES Bully-les-Mines (7)
274.	JF Guarbecque (9)	0–2	Calonne-Ricouart FC Cite 6 (8)
275.	US Croisilles (10)	0–4	OS Aire-sur-la-Lys (7)
276.	ES Val Sensée (12)	3–2	ES Labeuvrière (9)
277.	US Grenay (10)	3–5	USO Bruay-la-Buissière (8)
278.	US Pas-en-Artois (11)	0–5	US Saint-Pol-sur-Ternoise (8)
279.	Olympique Arras (12)	0–7	SC Pro Patria Wingles (8)
280.	US Hesdigneul (11)	3–2	CS Diana Liévin (7)
281.	AS Bailleul-Sir-Berthoult (13)	2–2 (5–6 p)	FC Hersin (11)
282.	FC Beaumont (13)	0–4	US Beuvry (11)
283.	US Annezin (11)	0–2	FC Montigny-en-Gohelle (9)
284.	AS Maroeuil (13)	1–1 (5–4 p)	AAE Aix-Noulette (11)
285.	AJ Neuville (12)	1–6	SC Aubigny Savy-Berlette (13)
286.	FC Givenchy-en-Gohelle (14)	0–0 (3–4 p)	AS Loison (10)
287.	ES Angres (12)	1–2	La Couture FC (10)
288.	Entente Verquin-Béthune (13)	1–1 (5–4 p)	AJ Ruitz (13)
289.	US Noyelles-sous-Lens (9)	2–0	US Saint-Maurice Loos-en-Gohelle (6)
290.	FCE La Bassée (15)	3–1	AS Roclincourt (13)
291.	UAS Harnes (8)	1–8	Stade Béthunois (6)
292.	US Houdain (12)	2–4	ES Sainte-Catherine (9)
293.	AS Brebières (11)	5–1	Olympique Burbure (11)
294.	FC La Roupie-Isbergues (12)	0–2	US Billy-Berclau (9)
295.	ES Ourton (14)	3–2	US Maisnil (13)
296.	FC Neuville-Saint-Rémy (11)	0–4	AC Cambrai (6)
297.	AS Templeuve-en-Pévèle (9)	1–0	EAC Cysoing-Wannehain-Bourghelles (9)
298.	ES Licourt (13)	0–7	Fraternelle Ailly-sur-Noye (10)

=== Third round ===
These matches were played on 18 and 19 September 2021.

Third round results: Hauts-de-France
Tie no	Home team (tier)	Score	Away team (tier)
1.	AS Conchil-le-Temple (9)	1–1 (3–4 p)	Le Touquet AC (5)
2.	FC Angy (11)	0–5	US Breteuil (7)
3.	AFC Creil (8)	0–0 (5–6 p)	USM Senlisienne (6)
4.	Boves SC (12)	2–2 (3–4 p)	FR Les Ageux (11)
5.	FC La Montoye (8)	1–2	US Camon (6)
6.	AF Amiens (12)	1–0	CS Amiens Montières Étouvie (9)
7.	JS Thieux (11)	1–1 (4–1 p)	US Balagny-Saint-Epin (7)
8.	US Lamorlaye (9)	0–2	FC Porto Portugais Amiens (7)
9.	Fraternelle Ailly-sur-Noye (10)	3–0	AS Noailles-Cauvigny (10)
10.	FC Esches Fosseuse (12)	2–2 (2–3 p)	US Villers-Saint-Paul (8)
11.	US Flesselles (10)	2–3	US Saint-Maximin (7)
12.	US Meru Sandricourt (8)	0–1	AC Amiens (5)
13.	ES Pigeonnier Amiens (8)	1–3	CS Chaumont-en-Vexin (6)
14.	AS Cheminots Chambly (13)	0–15	Amiens RIF (9)
15.	RC Amiens (8)	1–1 (4–2 p)	ESC Longueau (6)
16.	FC Liancourt-Clermont (8)	2–0	SC Saint-Just-en-Chaussée (8)
17.	AS La Neuville-sur-Oudeuil (10)	2–1	AS Ons-en-Bray (10)
18.	AS Tracy-le-Mont (11)	5–2	CS Villeneuve Saint-Germain (8)
19.	US Bruyères-et-Montbérault (9)	5–0	AS Multien (9)
20.	ES Clacy-Mons (10)	3–2	FC Boran (11)
21.	US Crépy-en-Valois (10)	1–0	JSA Compiègne-La Croix-Saint Ouen (10)
22.	US La Fère (12)	1–1 (4–3 p)	AS Glisy (9)
23.	BCV FC (9)	1–3	AFC Compiègne (6)
24.	US Lieuvillers (10)	2–0	ES Cagny (11)
25.	US Chevrières-Grandfresnoy (7)	0–0 (5–4 p)	US Pont Sainte-Maxence (7)
26.	ALJN Sinceny (12)	2–4	ES Ormoy-Duvy (9)
27.	Septmonts OC (9)	4–4 (4–2 p)	US Ouvriere Albert (9)
28.	US Roye-Noyon (6)	0–0 (4–5 p)	Internationale Soissonnaise (7)
29.	AS Querrieu (10)	3–5	US Margny-lès-Compiègne (8)
30.	CA Venette (10)	0–2	FC Béthisy (8)
31.	Tergnier FC (8)	5–1	FC 3 Châteaux (9)
32.	RC Précy (11)	0–0 (8–7 p)	Château Thierry-Etampes FC (8)
33.	ES Sainte-Emilie/Épehy-le-Ronss (12)	4–3	US Choisy-au-Bac (6)
34.	US Rosières (10)	0–3	Montdidier AC (8)
35.	FC Estrées-Mons (11)	0–1	US Prémontré Saint-Gobain (9)
36.	US Esmery-Hallon (13)	1–3	RC Salouël (10)
37.	Rollot AC (12)	1–4	US Chantilly (5)
38.	FC Vierzy (10)	1–5	US Chauny (6)
39.	US Nielles-lès-Bléquin (9)	0–3	US Montreuil (9)
40.	CA Éperlecques (9)	0–5	US Gravelines (6)
41.	CS Pernes (13)	0–4	AS Dunkerque Sud (8)
42.	AO Sainghinoise (8)	6–2	RC Ardrésien (9)
43.	FC Lillers (11)	6–0	US Hesdigneul (11)
44.	ES Calaisis Coulogne (8)	0–2	Calais Beau-Marais (8)
45.	Bonningues-lès-Calais (15)	0–8	US Saint-Omer (5)
46.	US Esquelbecq (7)	1–0	SCO Roubaix (8)
47.	AS Audruicq (8)	0–4	Grand Calais Pascal FC (7)
48.	FC Campagne-lès-Guines (9)	1–1 (4–3 p)	AS Marck (6)
49.	ES Guînes (9)	0–6	OS Aire-sur-la-Lys (7)
50.	AS Saint-Martin-au-Laërt (11)	1–2	US Leffrinckoucke (9)
51.	Calonne-Ricouart FC Cite 6 (8)	2–0	COS Marles-Lozinghem (9)
52.	FC Recques-sur-Hem (9)	1–3	FC Dunkerque-Malo Plage (7)
53.	Auchel FC (9)	2–0	Verlinghem Foot (9)
54.	ESD Isbergues (8)	1–4	AS Steenvorde (6)
55.	AC Cambrai (6)	1–1 (3–2 p)	Écureuils Itancourt-Neuville (6)
56.	Étaves-et-Bocquiaux FC (12)	0–3	FC Essigny-le-Grand (9)
57.	US Vervins (8)	2–2 (4–5 p)	ES Villers-Outréaux (8)
58.	US Guise (9)	0–1	US Laon (6)
59.	Le Nouvion AC (9)	1–8	CAS Escaudœuvres (6)
60.	RC Bohain (8)	5–0	SAS Moy de l'Aisne (8)
61.	ES Paillencourt-Estrun (10)	1–3	FC Provillois (9)
62.	Olympique Maroilles (10)	0–2	US Maubeuge (5)
63.	US Seboncourt (10)	1–2	ASG Louvroil (9)
64.	US Quievy (11)	0–2	SC Origny-en-Thiérache (9)
65.	FC Cambrai-Saint Roch (11)	0–6	Harly Quentin (9)
66.	US Jeumont (9)	3–0	US Aulnois-sous-Laon (10)
67.	FC Hannapes (11)	2–2 (4–5 p)	OM Cambrai Amérique (9)
68.	US Walincourt-Selvigny (9)	3–0	Gauchy-Grugies Saint-Quentin FC (9)
69.	US Ribemont Mezieres FC (7)	1–3	FC Marpent (7)
70.	AFC Ferrière-la-Petite (12)	0–5	AFC Holnon-Fayet (9)
71.	ES Boussois (10)	2–1	Maubeuge FCCA (11)
72.	US Buire-Hirson-Thiérache (8)	1–2	US Berlaimont (9)
73.	SC Le Cateau (12)	0–3	ES Caudry (9)
74.	US Villers-Sire-Nicole (14)	1–3	Sports Podéens Réunis (9)
75.	IC Ferrière-la-Grande (9)	0–1	US Rousies (10)
76.	Olympique Saint-Martin Boulogne (8)	1–3	AS Berck (9)
77.	US Attin (9)	6–0	FC Bouvigny-Boyeffles (9)
78.	AS Étaples (7)	1–0	AS Gamaches (7)
79.	US Elinghen-Ferques (12)	0–1	FC Ailly-sur-Somme Samara (8)
80.	FC Centuloise (8)	2–3	Verton FC (9)
81.	EC Houplines (9)	1–3	FC Seclin (7)
82.	CSAL Souchez (12)	4–2	FA Neuvilloise (8)
83.	AS Valines (10)	1–5	Auxiloise (9)
84.	AS Maroeuil (13)	0–5	OS Fives (7)
85.	AS Wimereux (10)	0–1	ES Roncq (8)
86.	US Créquy-Planquette (11)	1–3	ES Sainte-Catherine (9)
87.	ASIC Bouttencourt (11)	2–0	ESL Boulogne-sur-Mer (9)
88.	FC Loon-Plage (6)	2–1	Stade Portelois (6)
89.	AS Cucq (8)	2–2 (4–1 p)	US Friville-Escarbotin (8)
90.	SC Aubigny Savy-Berlette (13)	0–5	ES Anzin-Saint-Aubin (9)
91.	FC Oisemont (10)	3–2	RC Bréquerecque Ostrohove (10)
92.	AS Airaines-Allery (9)	6–0 (Note: Tie reversed from original draw.)	AS Long (14)
93.	Avenir Nouvion-en-Ponthieu (11)	1–0	AS Menchecourt-Thuison-La Bouvaque (11)
94.	FC Saint-Valéry Baie de Somme Sud (9)	0–1	AS Outreau (6)
95.	AF Étaples Haute Ville (9)	0–3	SC Abbeville (6)
96.	ES Saint-Léonard (9)	1–3	AS Nortkerque 95 (9)
97.	US Quiestède (9)	0–2	FC Madeleinois (8)
98.	RC Sains (12)	0–5	FC Santes (7)
99.	US Marquise (10)	0–1	FLC Longfossé (10)
100.	Roubaix SC (9)	3–3 (5–6 p)	Olympique Marcquois Football (5)
101.	Olympique Hesdin-Marconne (8)	2–3	US Pays de Cassel (6)
102.	ES Arques (8)	2–3	CG Haubourdin (9)
103.	La Couture FC (10)	1–5	US Portugais Roubaix Tourcoing (7)
104.	ES Ourton (14)	1–8	JS Longuenesse (8)
105.	US Blériot-Plage (7)	2–3	Olympique Lumbrois (6)
106.	AS Sainte-Barbe-Oignies (7)	2–2 (5–3 p)	JS Écourt-Saint-Quentin (8)
107.	FC Hersin (11)	3–2	FC Lille Sud (9)
108.	Entente Verquin-Béthune (13)	2–4	ES Weppes (8)
109.	AFCL Liebaut (8)	1–1 (4–2 p)	USCC Saint-Pol-sur-Mer (9)
110.	USO Bruay-la-Buissière (8)	2–2 (5–6 p)	SC Hazebrouck (6)
111.	ES Genech (10)	0–3	SC Bailleulois (8)
112.	AS Salomé (12)	0–8	Stade Béthunois (6)
113.	US Beuvry (11)	1–1 (2–4 p)	US Bourthes (9)
114.	Olympique Vendin (12)	5–0	US Blaringhem (9)
115.	FC Les Epis (9)	0–2	Mons AC (8)
116.	US Vermelles (7)	0–3	Feignies Aulnoye FC (5)
117.	Stella Lys (9)	0–3	ES Bully-les-Mines (7)
118.	Stade Orchésien (9)	0–6	Olympique Grande-Synthe (6)
119.	CS La Gorgue (8)	1–2	US Vimy (5)
120.	US Erre-Hornaing (9)	0–5	Arras FA (6)
121.	US Mineurs Waziers (7)	4–0	CS Avion (6)
122.	AS Kennedy Hénin-Beaumont (15)	0–5	Carabiniers Billy-Montigny (8)
123.	USAC Somain (10)	0–2	AS Beuvry-la-Forêt (7)
124.	ESM Hamel (10)	2–1	AS Brebières (11)
125.	Olympique Landasien (12)	0–2	Olympique Senséen (9)
126.	US Saint-Pol-sur-Ternoise (8)	1–3	ES Lambresienne (6)
127.	FC Montigny-en-Gohelle (9)	1–0	SC Aniche (8)
128.	US Ronchin (10)	1–2	US Noyelles-sous-Lens (9)
129.	US Wattrelos (7)	2–2 (4–1 p)	AEF Leforest (8)
130.	ES Ennequin-Loos (11)	0–3	SC Douai (7)
131.	Olympique Mérignies (12)	1–1 (6–7 p)	SC Saint-Nicolas-lez-Arras (8)
132.	AS Courrièroise (11)	1–1 (3–1 p)	US Aubygeoise (12)
133.	FC Férin (10)	1–1 (4–2 p)	US Biachoise (7)
134.	ES Val Sensée (12)	0–10	Iris Club de Croix (5)
135.	US Lieu-Saint-Amand (13)	0–1	Douchy FC (11)
136.	USM Marly (9)	2–1	IC La Sentinelle (7)
137.	FC Solesmes (11)	1–0	US Billy-Berclau (9)
138.	RC Labourse (9)	2–2 (8–9 p)	Villeneuve-d'Ascq Métropole (8)
139.	Anzin FARC (10)	2–3	UF Lambersart (7)
140.	US Quiévrechain (14)	1–8	FC Bondues (7)
141.	AS Templeuve-en-Pévèle (9)	0–1	US Tourcoing FC (6)
142.	US Hordain (8)	2–1	US Saint-André (6)
143.	Flers OS (10)	2–5	SC Pro Patria Wingles (8)
144.	USM Merville (11)	0–2	FC Raismes (7)
145.	EC Anstaing-Chéreng-Tressin-Gruson (9)	1–0	US Marquette (8)
146.	FCE La Bassée (15)	0–8	Wasquehal Football (5)
147.	SC Lourches (12)	0–3	US Escaudain (7)
148.	US Aulnoy (9)	0–4	FC Dutemple (8)
149.	AS Loison (10)	0–1	FC Annay (11)
150.	FC Saultain (12)	1–8	Saint-Amand FC (6)
151.	Maing FC (9)	5–5 (4–3 p)	USO Drocourt (10)
152.	FC Méteren (11)	1–5	OSM Sequedin (9)
153.	US Breuil-le-Sec (10)	0–1	US Gouvieux (7)
154.	US Fourmies (8)	3–3 (4–3 p)	US Bavay (8)

=== Fourth round ===
These matches were played on 2 and 3 October 2021, with two postponed until 10 October 2021.

Fourth round results: Hauts-de-France
Tie no	Home team (tier)	Score	Away team (tier)
1.	Auxiloise (9)	0–2	Wasquehal Football (5)
2.	SC Pro Patria Wingles (8)	0–4	Feignies Aulnoye FC (5)
3.	US Fourmies (8)	1–2	AC Cambrai (6)
4.	OM Cambrai Amérique (9)	1–1 (3–1 p)	US Chantilly (5)
5.	US Chauny (6)	2–1	Le Touquet AC (5)
6.	US Noyelles-sous-Lens (9)	1–6	US Gravelines (6)
7.	FC Hersin (11)	0–13	Olympique Marcquois Football (5)
8.	OS Fives (7)	1–2	US Hordain (8)
9.	FLC Longfossé (10)	0–2	ESM Hamel (10)
10.	FC Bondues (7)	0–0 (3–2 p)	US Saint-Omer (5)
11.	ES Weppes (8)	1–6	FC Montigny-en-Gohelle (9)
12.	ES Lambresienne (6)	8–1	SC Abbeville (6)
13.	Avenir Nouvion-en-Ponthieu (11)	0–8	Olympique Lumbrois (6)
14.	FC Lillers (11)	0–1	UF Lambersart (7)
15.	US Montreuil (9)	3–1	US Leffrinckoucke (9)
16.	FC Ailly-sur-Somme Samara (8)	1–1 (5–4 p)	US Attin (9)
17.	ASIC Bouttencourt (11)	0–4	FC Loon-Plage (6)
18.	CSAL Souchez (12)	2–3	Calais Beau-Marais (8)
19.	FC Dunkerque-Malo Plage (7)	1–2	OS Aire-sur-la-Lys (7)
20.	FC Férin (10)	1–3	Montdidier AC (8)
21.	AS Nortkerque 95 (9)	0–2	AC Amiens (5)
22.	ES Bully-les-Mines (7)	3–1	SC Douai (7)
23.	ASG Louvroil (9)	4–1	US Walincourt-Selvigny (9)
24.	Olympique Senséen (9)	1–2	AS Beuvry-la-Forêt (7)
25.	Carabiniers Billy-Montigny (8)	3–1	US Wattrelos (7)
26.	Olympique Vendin (12)	3–0	Maing FC (9)
27.	CG Haubourdin (9)	2–3	USM Marly (9)
28.	OSM Sequedin (9)	0–5	US Maubeuge (5)
29.	Auchel FC (9)	0–2	FC Seclin (7)
30.	EC Anstaing-Chéreng-Tressin-Gruson (9)	2–2 (4–5 p)	US Escaudain (7)
31.	JS Longuenesse (8)	2–0	US Bourthes (9)
32.	Iris Club de Croix (5)	2–1	Saint-Amand FC (6)
33.	FC Raismes (7)	1–1 (4–3 p)	AS Steenvorde (6)
34.	US Pays de Cassel (6)	1–3	Olympique Grande-Synthe (6)
35.	FC Campagne-lès-Guines (9)	1–2	US Portugais Roubaix Tourcoing (7)
36.	AS Courrièroise (11)	3–5	CAS Escaudœuvres (6)
37.	Douchy FC (11)	1–3	US Tourcoing FC (6)
38.	FC Annay (11)	0–1	ES Anzin-Saint-Aubin (9)
39.	Mons AC (8)	0–0 (4–2 p)	AS Dunkerque Sud (8)
40.	Verton FC (9)	3–2	FC Santes (7)
41.	FC Dutemple (8)	5–2	AO Sainghinoise (8)
42.	Grand Calais Pascal FC (7)	1–1 (5–4 p)	Arras FA (6)
43.	RC Précy (11)	0–3	USM Senlisienne (6)
44.	SC Bailleulois (8)	1–3	US Gouvieux (7)
45.	Tergnier FC (8)	0–2	AFC Compiègne (6)
46.	Fraternelle Ailly-sur-Noye (10)	0–2	US Esquelbecq (7)
47.	ES Ormoy-Duvy (9)	2–5	FC Béthisy (8)
48.	FR Les Ageux (11)	1–3	AS Airaines-Allery (9)
49.	Septmonts OC (9)	1–10	US Camon (6)
50.	Amiens RIF (9)	2–2 (0–3 p)	RC Salouël (10)
51.	FC Provillois (9)	1–2	FC Liancourt-Clermont (8)
52.	ES Roncq (8)	3–0	AFCL Liebaut (8)
53.	US Prémontré Saint-Gobain (9)	2–2 (4–2 p)	AS La Neuville-sur-Oudeuil (10)
54.	FC Oisemont (10)	1–1 (4–5 p)	US Breteuil (7)
55.	AF Amiens (12)	0–11	AS Beauvais Oise (4)
56.	JS Thieux (11)	0–4	US Villers-Saint-Paul (8)
57.	AS Tracy-le-Mont (11)	4–0	ES Sainte-Emilie/Épehy-le-Ronss (12)
58.	US Lieuvillers (10)	2–5	Villeneuve-d'Ascq Métropole (8)
59.	FC Madeleinois (8)	0–2	AS Étaples (7)
60.	ES Caudry (9)	2–3	RC Amiens (8)
61.	US Jeumont (9)	0–1	US Laon (6)
62.	US Rousies (10)	0–4	Stade Béthunois (6)
63.	US Margny-lès-Compiègne (8)	0–3	US Chevrières-Grandfresnoy (7)
64.	CS Chaumont-en-Vexin (6)	2–2 (2–4 p)	Internationale Soissonnaise (7)
65.	US Bruyères-et-Montbérault (9)	0–9	Olympique Saint-Quentin (4)
66.	FC Porto Portugais Amiens (7)	1–0	US Vimy (5)
67.	ES Sainte-Catherine (9)	0–5	SC Hazebrouck (6)
68.	FC Solesmes (11)	0–4	AS Sainte-Barbe-Oignies (7)
69.	Harly Quentin (9)	2–2 (5–3 p)	AFC Holnon-Fayet (9)
70.	ES Clacy-Mons (10)	0–2	US Saint-Maximin (7)
71.	SC Origny-en-Thiérache (9)	2–4	RC Bohain (8)
72.	FC Essigny-le-Grand (9)	1–1 (3–2 p)	ES Boussois (10)
73.	US La Fère (12)	1–3	US Berlaimont (9)
74.	Sports Podéens Réunis (9)	1–1 (4–2 p)	ES Villers-Outréaux (8)
75.	FC Marpent (7)	7–1	SC Saint-Nicolas-lez-Arras (8)
76.	US Crépy-en-Valois (10)	0–7	US Mineurs Waziers (7)
77.	AS Cucq (8)	1–4	Calonne-Ricouart FC Cite 6 (8)
78.	AS Berck (9)	1–1 (4–2 p)	AS Outreau (6)

=== Fifth round ===
These matches were played on 16 and 17 October 2021.

Fifth round results: Hauts-de-France
Tie no	Home team (tier)	Score	Away team (tier)
1.	AS Beuvry-la-Forêt (7)	0–3	Olympique Lumbrois (6)
2.	US Chevrières-Grandfresnoy (7)	0–7	FC Chambly (3)
3.	Calonne-Ricouart FC Cite 6 (8)	0–0 (4–3 p)	USM Senlisienne (6)
4.	ASG Louvroil (9)	1–1 (2–4 p)	US Portugais Roubaix Tourcoing (7)
5.	FC Essigny-le-Grand (9)	0–9	US Escaudain (7)
6.	RC Bohain (8)	0–1	FC Raismes (7)
7.	FC Marpent (7)	0–1	Olympique Saint-Quentin (4)
8.	US Prémontré Saint-Gobain (9)	2–0	CAS Escaudœuvres (6)
9.	Montdidier AC (8)	0–1	FC Dutemple (8)
10.	Calais Beau-Marais (8)	0–2	Olympique Marcquois Football (5)
11.	ESM Hamel (10)	2–2 (3–1 p)	US Chauny (6)
12.	Verton FC (9)	1–4	AC Cambrai (6)
13.	Internationale Soissonnaise (7)	4–2	RC Amiens (8)
14.	Sports Podéens Réunis (9)	1–7	Wasquehal Football (5)
15.	AS Tracy-le-Mont (11)	0–2	FC Loon-Plage (6)
16.	FC Montigny-en-Gohelle (9)	2–2 (6–5 p)	US Breteuil (7)
17.	SC Hazebrouck (6)	2–0	AS Sainte-Barbe-Oignies (7)
18.	FC Liancourt-Clermont (8)	2–7	FC Seclin (7)
19.	Feignies Aulnoye FC (5)	3–1	US Laon (6)
20.	FC Ailly-sur-Somme Samara (8)	2–0	Harly Quentin (9)
21.	AFC Compiègne (6)	1–2	Stade Béthunois (6)
22.	AS Étaples (7)	2–1	FC Bondues (7)
23.	RC Salouël (10)	1–1 (3–1 p)	ES Lambresienne (6)
24.	US Berlaimont (9)	2–0	OM Cambrai Amérique (9)
25.	US Villers-Saint-Paul (8)	1–6	US Camon (6)
26.	US Esquelbecq (7)	2–0	ES Roncq (8)
27.	UF Lambersart (7)	1–2	Olympique Grande-Synthe (6)
28.	FC Béthisy (8)	1–1 (5–6 p)	OS Aire-sur-la-Lys (7)
29.	US Montreuil (9)	0–2	AC Amiens (5)
30.	Olympique Vendin (12)	0–4	Carabiniers Billy-Montigny (8)
31.	USM Marly (9)	3–4	ES Bully-les-Mines (7)
32.	US Hordain (8)	1–2	ES Anzin-Saint-Aubin (9)
33.	US Gouvieux (7)	0–4	Iris Club de Croix (5)
34.	FC Porto Portugais Amiens (7)	1–2	US Maubeuge (5)
35.	US Mineurs Waziers (7)	4–1	US Gravelines (6)
36.	Mons AC (8)	2–0	JS Longuenesse (8)
37.	AS Berck (9)	2–1	US Saint-Maximin (7)
38.	US Tourcoing FC (6)	1–0	US Boulogne (3)
39.	AS Airaines-Allery (9)	0–3	Villeneuve-d'Ascq Métropole (8)
40.	Grand Calais Pascal FC (7)	1–4	AS Beauvais Oise (4)

=== Sixth round ===
These matches were played on 30 and 31 October 2021.

Sixth round results: Hauts-de-France
Tie no	Home team (tier)	Score	Away team (tier)
1.	Calonne-Ricouart FC Cite 6 (8)	2–2 (4–3 p)	Olympique Grande-Synthe (6)
2.	Internationale Soissonnaise (7)	0–1	AC Amiens (5)
3.	Carabiniers Billy-Montigny (8)	0–2	Feignies Aulnoye FC (5)
4.	US Berlaimont (9)	0–6	ES Bully-les-Mines (7)
5.	US Camon (6)	0–2	AS Beauvais Oise (4)
6.	AS Berck (9)	2–4	FC Raismes (7)
7.	Villeneuve-d'Ascq Métropole (8)	1–2	ES Anzin-Saint-Aubin (9)
8.	ESM Hamel (10)	1–0	FC Ailly-sur-Somme Samara (8)
9.	FC Seclin (7)	1–1 (5–6 p)	FC Dutemple (8)
10.	Iris Club de Croix (5)	0–0 (1–4 p)	FC Loon-Plage (6)
11.	US Maubeuge (5)	2–3	FC Chambly (3)
12.	US Escaudain (7)	1–1 (3–5 p)	AS Étaples (7)
13.	US Prémontré Saint-Gobain (9)	0–3	Stade Béthunois (6)
14.	SC Hazebrouck (6)	2–4	US Esquelbecq (7)
15.	US Mineurs Waziers (7)	4–2 (Note: Tie reversed from original draw.)	Mons AC (8)
16.	Olympique Marcquois Football (5)	1–1 (2–4 p)	AC Cambrai (6)
17.	RC Salouël (10)	2–2 (6–5 p)	US Portugais Roubaix Tourcoing (7)
18.	OS Aire-sur-la-Lys (7)	1–1 (11–12 p)	US Tourcoing FC (6)
19.	Olympique Saint-Quentin (4)	0–0 (3–4 p)	Wasquehal Football (5)
20.	FC Montigny-en-Gohelle (9)	0–2	Olympique Lumbrois (6)
