= Kevin Mirallas =

Belgian association football player (born 1987)

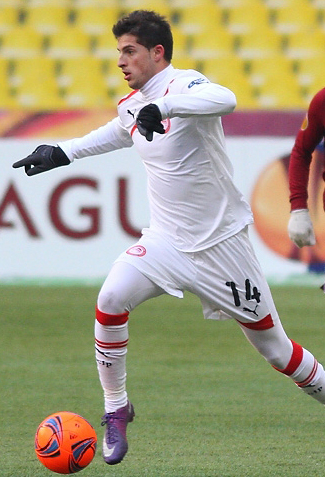
- Mirallas playing for Olympiacos in 2012

Personal information
- Full name: Kevin Antonio Joel Gislain Mirallas y Castillo
- Date of birth: 5 October 1987 (age 39)
- Place of birth: Liège, Belgium
- Height: 1.82 m (6 ft 0 in)
- Positions: Winger; striker

Youth career
- 1999–2004: Standard Liège

Senior career*
| Years | Team | Apps | (Gls) |
| 2004–2008 | Lille | 76 | (10) |
| 2008–2010 | Saint-Étienne | 53 | (3) |
| 2010–2011 | → Olympiacos (loan) | 27 | (14) |
| 2011–2012 | Olympiacos | 25 | (20) |
| 2012–2019 | Everton | 151 | (29) |
| 2018 | → Olympiacos (loan) | 13 | (2) |
| 2018–2019 | → Fiorentina (loan) | 27 | (2) |
| 2019–2020 | Royal Antwerp | 18 | (2) |
| 2020–2021 | Gaziantep | 28 | (5) |
| 2022 | Moreirense | 8 | (1) |
| 2022–2023 | AEL Limassol | 21 | (4) |
| Total | | 447 | (92) |

International career
| 2003 | Belgium U16 | 10 | (8) |
| 2003–2004 | Belgium U17 | 13 | (7) |
| 2005 | Belgium U18 | 4 | (0) |
| 2005–2006 | Belgium U19 | 16 | (4) |
| 2006–2007 | Belgium U21 | 5 | (2) |
| 2007–2018 | Belgium | 60 | (10) |
- * Club domestic league appearances and goals

Kevin Antonio Joel Gislain Mirallas y Castillo (born 5 October 1987), known as Kevin Mirallas (Spanish pronunciation: [ˈkeβim miˈɾaʎas]), is a Belgian former professional footballer who played as a winger.

Mirallas started his professional career in Ligue 1 with Lille and Saint-Étienne before moving to Greece with Olympiacos in 2010. Mirallas enjoyed success during his time at Olympiacos, scoring 34 goals in 52 league games. He was top scorer in his second season with Olympiacos with 20 goals in 25 games. His impressive performances attracted the attention of Everton, who signed him in the summer of 2012 for £6 million. After featuring regularly for the Merseyside club in the next five and a half seasons, he was loaned back to Olympiacos in January 2018, spending the remainder of the season there, as well as having another loan spell at Fiorentina during the following season. Mirallas spent the last four seasons of his professional career at four different clubs, first returning to his home country with Royal Antwerp. He then went on to play for Turkish side Gaziantep, Portuguese side Moreirense, and then finally ended his career after a season-long stint in Cyprus with AEL Limassol.

Mirallas represented Belgium at various youth levels and then went on to earn 60 caps for the senior national team, making his debut in 2007. He featured for Belgium at two major tournaments, first appearing at the 2008 Olympics and most notably at the 2014 FIFA World Cup.

== Club career ==
=== Early career ===
Mirallas spent his youth career playing for his hometown club, Standard Liège. He then left Belgium and began his first team career in France with Lille OSC in the 2004–05 season. Mirallas participated in the UEFA Cup in his first season at Lille. Mirallas was transferred to AS Saint-Étienne for €4 million, and made a name for himself by scoring against Lyon on his debut in the Rhone-Loire derby.

=== Olympiacos ===
In June 2010, Mirallas joined Greek club Olympiacos on a one-year loan for a fee of €2.5 million. Mirallas made his debut in a 5–0 win against KS Besa Kavaje in the Second Qualifying Round of the UEFA Europa League Qualifiers and scored his first two goals for the club in a 3–1 home win against Olympiacos Volos. Mirallas scored in a 2–1 away loss to their greatest rivals Panathinaikos in the Derby of the eternal enemies, after which his contract was extended to four years. Olympiacos won that season's Super League Greece and Mirallas finished as the club's top scorer with 14 goals, with only Panathinaikos's Djibril Cissé scoring more league goals. The following season Mirallas scored his first ever hat-trick for Olympiacos in a 4–0 away win against Levadiakos and scored four in a 7–2 victory over Asteras Tripolis. Olympiacos again won the league, and Mirallas was the league's top scorer with 20 goals.

=== Everton ===
In August 2012, Mirallas joined Premier League club Everton for a reported fee of £6 million. He made his debut as a second-half substitute during a 3–1 league win over Aston Villa at Villa Park in which he had a headed goal disallowed after he was ruled offside. In his first start four days later, Mirallas scored twice and provided two assists as Everton won 5–0 against Leyton Orient in the second round of the League Cup. He scored his first league goal on 22 September 2012, in a 3–0 away win against Swansea City after heading in his initial effort which rebounded off the underside of the bar. Mirallas suffered a number of injuries that limited his playing time during the middle part of the season. He made a number of brief cameos, notably against Tottenham Hotspur in December. Mirallas' next goal came against Oldham Athletic in a 3–1 win on 26 February 2013 in the fifth round of the FA Cup. He then scored his second league goal of the season against Reading in a 3–1 win on 2 March 2013. He scored his first league brace in David Moyes' last home game in charge of Everton, a 2–0 win against West Ham United.

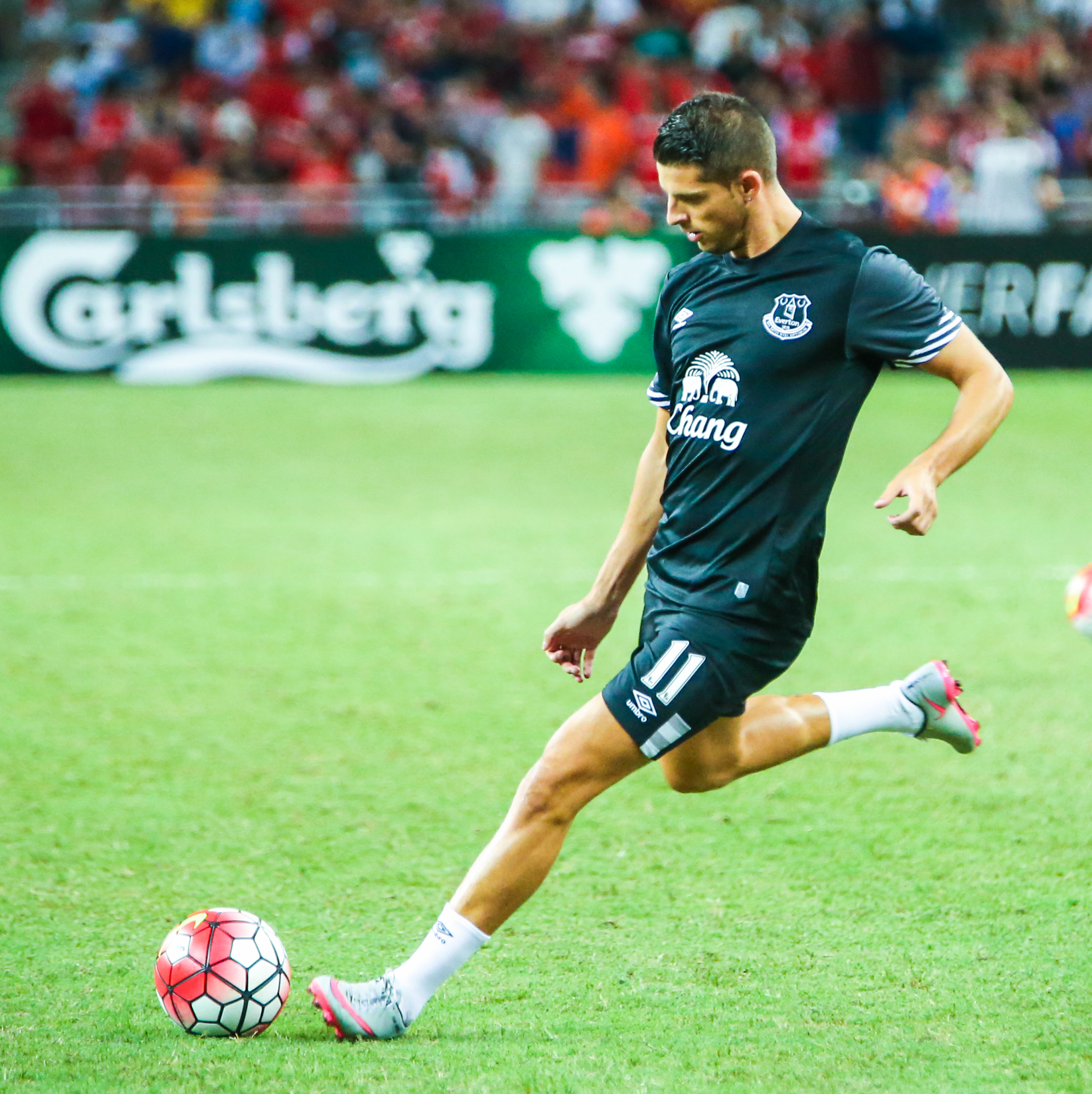
Mirallas warming-up for Everton in 2015

Mirallas scored and assisted a goal during a 3–3 draw in the first Merseyside derby of the 2013–14 season on 23 November. He also received a booking for a high challenge on Luis Suárez, which opposing manager Brendan Rodgers described as reckless and insisted Mirallas was lucky to remain on the pitch. He went on to score eight goals before suffering a season-ending groin injury in April. Mirallas created 61 chances for his teammates during the season, the most of any Everton player.

On 18 September 2014, Mirallas scored his first European goal for Everton in a 4–1 win over Wolfsburg in the first match of their Europa League campaign. He signed a new three-year contract with the club in August 2015.

Mirallas scored his 29th Premier League goal for Everton on 11 March 2017 as Everton cruised to victory over West Bromwich Albion at Goodison Park in a 3–0 win. On 12 May 2017, Mirallas signed a new three-year contract deal with Everton until the end of June 2020.

==== Loans ====
On 7 January 2018, Mirallas agreed to return to former club Olympiacos on loan until the end of the 2017–18 season. The club did not have an option to purchase Mirallas as part of the contract. On 16 April, Mirallas scored a stunning strike from the edge of the penalty area on the stroke of half-time in a 5–1 home win against Kerkyra. On 4 May, his loan spell was terminated by mutual consent due to Everton's high asking price to purchase Mirallas outright, as well as Mirallas' overall subpar performances with Olympiacos.

On 4 August 2018, Mirallas signed for Fiorentina on a season-long loan deal with the option to make the transfer permanent.

=== Antwerp ===
Mirallas joined Royal Antwerp on a free transfer in August 2019.

=== Gaziantep ===
On 5 October 2020, Mirallas joined Turkish Süper Lig club Gaziantep.

=== Moreirense ===
On 24 January 2022, Mirallas joined Moreirense on a free transfer until the end of the 2021–22 season.

=== AEL Limassol ===
On 23 July 2022, Mirallas joined AEL Limassol for the 2022–23 season.

=== Retirement and Technology officer ===
On 31 August 2023, Mirallas officially retired as a professional footballer. He joined Eendracht Aalst as their chief technology officer.

== International career ==
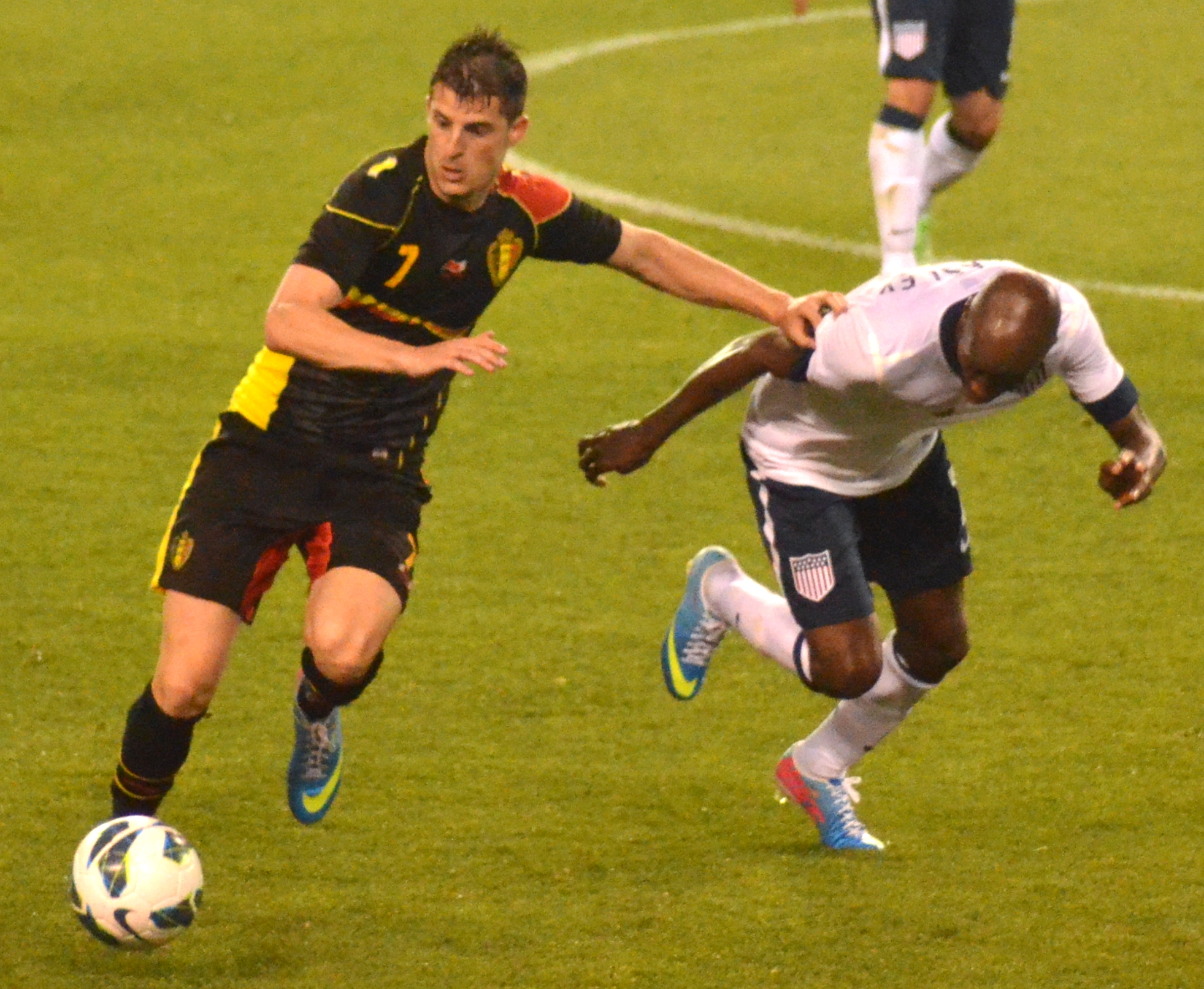
Mirallas in action against DaMarcus Beasley during an international friendly against the United States on 29 May 2013

Mirallas has represented Belgium at under-17, under-19 and under-21 level, and was one of the leading figures in guiding the under-21s to the semi-finals of the 2007 UEFA European Under-21 Football Championship.

He scored twice in the 2008 Summer Olympics football tournament, once against China (2–0 victory) and once against Italy (3–2 victory). He made his full international debut for the senior team in 2007 and scored his first ever international goal against Serbia in Brussels on 23 August of that year, as a Mousa Dembélé brace helped the Red Devils to a 3–2 home victory.

Mirallas was part of the Belgian squad which reached the quarter-finals at the 2014 FIFA World Cup. He made his tournament debut in the second group match, a 1–0 win over Russia at the Maracanã, as a 75th-minute substitute for Dries Mertens. In a game of few opportunities, Mirallas hit the post with Belgium's first shot on target. Another substitute, Divock Origi, scored the game's only goal two minutes from full-time.

In May 2018, Mirallas was left out of Belgium's preliminary squad for the 2018 FIFA World Cup in Russia.

== Style of play ==
Mirallas was deployed as a centre forward for Olympiacos, but after his move to Everton he was deployed mainly as a Winger or a free-roaming forward. He was known for his pace, close ball control, passing ability and proficiency in one-on-one situations.

== Personal life ==
Mirallas' father was born in Spain and lived a good portion of his early life in Madrid.

== Career statistics ==
=== Club ===
Appearances and goals by club, season and competition
| Club | Season | League | | | National cup (Note: Includes Coupe de France, Greek Cup, FA Cup, Coppa Italia, Belgian Cup, Turkish Cup, Cypriot Cup) | | League cup (Note: Includes Coupe de la Ligue, Football League Cup) | | Europe | | Other | | Total | |
| Club | Season | Division | Apps | Goals | Apps | Goals | Apps | Goals | Apps | Goals | Apps | Goals | Apps | Goals |
|---|---|---|---|---|---|---|---|---|---|---|---|---|---|---|
| Lille | 2004–05 | Ligue 1 | 3 | 1 | 0 | 0 | 0 | 0 | 0 | 0 | — | | 3 | 1 |
| Lille | 2005–06 | Ligue 1 | 15 | 1 | 0 | 0 | 2 | 0 | 2 | 0 | — | | 19 | 1 |
| Lille | 2006–07 | Ligue 1 | 23 | 2 | 0 | 0 | 2 | 0 | 5 | 0 | — | | 30 | 2 |
| Lille | 2007–08 | Ligue 1 | 35 | 6 | 2 | 1 | 0 | 0 | — | | — | | 37 | 7 |
| Lille | Total | | 76 | 10 | 2 | 1 | 4 | 0 | 7 | 0 | — | | 89 | 11 |
| Saint-Étienne | 2008–09 | Ligue 1 | 30 | 3 | 2 | 0 | 0 | 0 | 8 | 1 | — | | 40 | 4 |
| Saint-Étienne | 2009–10 | Ligue 1 | 23 | 0 | 4 | 1 | 2 | 0 | 0 | 0 | — | | 29 | 1 |
| Saint-Étienne | Total | | 53 | 3 | 6 | 1 | 2 | 0 | 8 | 1 | — | | 69 | 5 |
| Olympiacos | 2010–11 | Super League Greece | 27 | 14 | 3 | 0 | — | | 3 | 0 | — | | 33 | 14 |
| Olympiacos | 2011–12 | Super League Greece | 25 | 20 | 3 | 0 | — | | 6 | 0 | — | | 34 | 20 |
| Olympiacos | Total | | 52 | 34 | 6 | 0 | — | | 9 | 0 | — | | 67 | 34 |
| Everton | 2012–13 | Premier League | 27 | 6 | 4 | 1 | 2 | 2 | — | | — | | 33 | 9 |
| Everton | 2013–14 | Premier League | 32 | 8 (Note: Mirallas' Everton F.C. profile gives him nine Premier League goals for the 2013–14 season, one more than do other sources. After the Dubious Goals Panel awarded his goal on 19 October 2013 against Hull City to Gareth Barry, Everton's website added it to Barry's record but failed to subtract it from Mirallas'. For more detail and sources, see Talk:Kevin Mirallas#Everton goals 2013–14.) | 4 | 0 | 1 | 0 | — | | — | | 37 | 8 |
| Everton | 2014–15 | Premier League | 29 | 7 | 2 | 1 | 0 | 0 | 5 (Note: Appearances in UEFA Europa League) | 3 | — | | 36 | 11 |
| Everton | 2015–16 | Premier League | 23 | 4 | 3 | 1 | 4 | 1 | — | | — | | 30 | 6 |
| Everton | 2016–17 | Premier League | 35 | 4 | 1 | 0 | 1 | 0 | — | | — | | 37 | 4 |
| Everton | 2017–18 | Premier League | 5 | 0 | 0 | 0 | 1 | 0 | 7 | 0 | — | | 13 | 0 |
| Everton | Total | | 151 | 29 | 14 | 3 | 9 | 3 | 12 | 3 | — | | 186 | 38 |
| Olympiacos (loan) | 2017–18 | Super League Greece | 13 | 2 | 3 | 0 | — | | — | | — | | 16 | 2 |
| Fiorentina (loan) | 2018–19 | Serie A | 27 | 2 | 3 | 0 | — | | — | | — | | 30 | 2 |
| Royal Antwerp | 2019–20 | Belgian Pro League | 18 | 2 | 3 | 0 | — | | — | | — | | 21 | 2 |
| Gaziantep | 2020–21 | Süper Lig | 28 | 5 | 3 | 2 | — | | — | | — | | 31 | 7 |
| Moreirense | 2021–22 | Primeira Liga | 8 | 1 | 0 | 0 | 0 | 0 | — | | 1 (Note: Appearance in Primeira Liga relegation play-offs) | 0 | 9 | 1 |
| AEL Limassol | 2022–23 | Cypriot First Division | 21 | 4 | 5 | 0 | — | | — | | — | | 26 | 4 |
| Career total | | | 447 | 92 | 45 | 7 | 15 | 3 | 36 | 4 | 1 | 0 | 544 | 106 |

=== International ===
Appearances and goals by national team and year
| National team | Year | Apps | Goals |
|---|---|---|---|
| Belgium | 2007 | 6 | 2 |
| Belgium | 2008 | 4 | 1 |
| Belgium | 2009 | 9 | 1 |
| Belgium | 2010 | 2 | 0 |
| Belgium | 2011 | 3 | 0 |
| Belgium | 2012 | 8 | 2 |
| Belgium | 2013 | 10 | 3 |
| Belgium | 2014 | 8 | 0 |
| Belgium | 2015 | 1 | 0 |
| Belgium | 2016 | 4 | 0 |
| Belgium | 2017 | 4 | 1 |
| Belgium | 2018 | 1 | 0 |
| Total | | 60 | 10 |

Scores and results list Belgium's goal tally first, score column indicates score after each Mirallas goal.

List of international goals scored by Kevin Mirallas
| No. | Date | Venue | Opponent | Score | Result | Competition |
|---|---|---|---|---|---|---|
| 1 | 22 August 2007 | King Baudouin Stadium, Brussels, Belgium | Serbia | 2–0 | 3–2 | UEFA Euro 2008 qualifying |
| 2 | 12 September 2007 | Almaty Central Stadium, Almaty, Kazakhstan | Kazakhstan | 2–1 | 2–2 | UEFA Euro 2008 qualifying |
| 3 | 19 November 2008 | Stade Josy Barthel, Luxembourg City, Luxembourg | Luxembourg | 1–0 | 1–1 | Friendly |
| 4 | 14 November 2009 | Jules Ottenstadion, Ghent, Belgium | Hungary | 3–0 | 3–0 | Friendly |
| 5 | 25 May 2012 | King Baudouin Stadium, Brussels, Belgium | Montenegro | 1–1 | 2–2 | Friendly |
| 6 | 12 October 2012 | Stadium Crvena Zvezda, Belgrade, Serbia | Serbia | 3–0 | 3–0 | 2014 FIFA World Cup Qualifying |
| 7 | 29 May 2013 | FirstEnergy Stadium, Cleveland, United States | United States | 1–0 | 4–2 | Friendly |
| 8 | 6 September 2013 | Hampden Park, Glasgow, Scotland | Scotland | 2–0 | 2–0 | 2014 FIFA World Cup Qualifying |
| 9 | 19 November 2013 | King Baudouin Stadium, Brussels, Belgium | Japan | 1–0 | 2–3 | Friendly |
| 10 | 28 March 2017 | Fisht Olympic Stadium, Sochi, Russia | Russia | 1–1 | 3–3 | Friendly |

== Honours ==
Olympiacos

- Super League Greece: 2010–11, 2011–12
- Greek Cup: 2011–12

Individual

- UEFA European Under-21 Championship Team of the Tournament: 2007
- Super League Greece Top Goalscorer: 2011–12 (20 goals)
- Super League Greece Player of the Season: 2011–12
- Super League Greece Foreign Player of the Season: 2011–12
- BBC Goal of the Month: May 2013
