= Iris Club de Croix =

French football club

- Full name: Iris Club de Croix
- Founded: 1952; 74 years ago
- Ground: Stade Henri Seigneur, Croix
- Capacity: 2,000
- Chairman: Patrice Weynants
- Manager: Reynald Dabrowski
- League: National 3 Group G
- 2022–23: National 3 Group I, 5th
- Website: iccroix.footeo.com

Iris Club de Croix, commonly referred to as IC Croix, is a French association football club based in Croix in the Nord department in the north of France. The club was formed in 1952 through a merger of two clubs from the town. For the first half-century of existence, the club played football at district level, but a series of promotions in the second half of the first decade of the 21st century elevated it to the national leagues. As of the 2020–21 season it competes in Championnat National 3, the fifth tier of football in France. The club's highest league competed was Championnat National 3 between 2015 and 2020.

== History ==
The club was formed in 1952 through a merger of two local teams, Amical de Croix and Celtic de Croix, and played in the Nord district divisions of the Nord-Pas-de-Calais Ligue. Between 2006 and 2009 the club won four successive promotions, from the top district division (1^{er} Division) to the top division of the Nord-Pas-de Calais Ligue (Division d'Honneur, the sixth level of football in France).

In 2011 the club won a league and cup double, finishing at the top of the Division d'Honneur, and winning the Nord Pas-de-Calais League Cup, gaining promotion to the Championnat de France Amateur 2 for the 2012–13 season.

In November 2012, the club merged with another local club, Stade de Croix. The following season, the club finished top of group B of CFA2, gaining promotion to CFA, and were overall champions of the division. In the 2015–16 season the club finished in 2nd place in CFA Group A, the highest league finishing position it has achieved to date. At the end of the 2019–20 seasons the club suffered relegation to Championnat National 3, when the season was ended early due to the COVID-19 pandemic.

== Stadium ==
The club play at Stade Henri Seigneur, which has a capacity of 2,000.

== Current squad ==
As of 5 October 2018

Note: Flags indicate national team as defined under FIFA eligibility rules; some limited exceptions apply. Players may hold more than one non-FIFA nationality.

No.	Pos.	Nation	Player
—	GK	FRA	Alexis Bockstal
—	GK	FRA	Clément Pétrel
—	GK	FRA	Romain van Herreweghe
—	DF	FRA	Alexandre Carvalho
—	DF	FRA	Pierre Derville
—	DF	MLI	Mamadou Dia
—	DF	FRA	Kandanso Tamanate
—	DF	FRA	Alexis Zmijak
—	DF	FRA	Thomas Decottignies
—	MF	FRA	Thomas De Parmentier
—	MF	FRA	Emmanuel Debordeaux

No.	Pos.	Nation	Player
—	MF	FRA	Amaury Dos Santos
—	MF	FRA	Pierre Grebaut
—	MF	FRA	Brian Obino
—	MF	FRA	Samuel Robail
—	MF	ALG	Nadir Guenoun
—	MF	FRA	Fares Hassani
—	MF	FRA	Mathieu Robail
—	FW	FRA	Samuel Betina
—	FW	MAR	Sofiane Mihoubi
—	FW	LBY	Ryad Habbas

== Honours ==
- Champion, Promotion d'Honneur Régionale (Level 9), Nord-Pas-de-Calais: 2007
- Champion, Promotion d'Honneur (Level 8), Nord-Pas-de-Calais: 2008
- Champion, Division d'Honneur Régionale (Level 7), Nord-Pas-de-Calais: 2009
- Champion, Division d'Honneur (Level 6), Nord-Pas-de-Calais: 2010
- Champion, Championnat de France Amateur 2: 2014
