= Yohann Lacroix =

French former professional footballer (born 1985)

Yohan Lacroix
Personal information
- Full name: Yohan Lacroix
- Date of birth: February 1, 1985 (age 41)
- Place of birth: Thonon-les-Bains, France
- Height: 1.96 m (6 ft 5 in)
- Position: Goalkeeper

Youth career
- 1999–2003: Auxerre

Senior career*
Years	Team	Apps	(Gls)
2003–2008	Lille	3	(0)
2006–2007	→ L'Entente SSG (loan)	23	(0)
2008–2009	Thrasyvoulos	13	(0)
2010–2011	Étoile	41	(0)
2011–2012	Tampines Rovers	27	(0)
2012	Étoile	0	(0)
2013–2015	Crusaders	28	(0)
2014	Ballymena United	14	(0)
2014–2018	US Terre Sainte	39	(0)
- * Club domestic league appearances and goals as of 4 May 2018

Yohann Lacroix (born February 1, 1985) is a French retired professional footballer who played as a goalkeeper.

Lacroix hold the record by not conceding a single goal for 1,045 minutes in the S.League history keeping a league record of 19 clean sheet in 33 league matches played.

== Club career ==
Born in Thonon-les-Bains, France, Lacroix began his career in the junior ranks of Auxerre. In 2003, he signed with Lille OSC and worked his way up through the ranks into the first team, signing a professional contract in 2005. He made his first appearance for the Lille first team, playing in a UEFA Intertoto Cup match against Dinamo Minsk in 2004. He was loaned to Championnat National side L'Entente SSG for the 2006–07 season where he made 23 appearances.

=== Singapore stint ===
After a stint in Greece, Lacroix tried his adventure in Singapore by signing with Étoile. With this club, he won the Singapore League Cup and the S.League title in 2010. He set a new league clean sheet record by not conceding a single goal for 1,045 minutes in the season keeping a league record of 19 clean sheet in 33 league matched played.

In June 2011, Lacroix joined top Singapore club Tampines Rovers with whom he won the championship for a second time, ending a seven-year title drought for the Rovers. With this new success, he became the first player in the history of the Singapore Premier League to win the league title both with a foreign franchise (Étoile in 2010) and a local franchise (Tampines Rovers in 2011).

In January 2012, Lacroix signed a three-year contract with his former team Étoile. A few days before the championship began the franchise in disagreement with the Football Association of Singapore decided to withdraw from the Singapore Premier League.

=== Linfield ===
After an injury to their number one keeper Sean O'Neill against Linfield on 12 January 2013, Crusaders of Northern Ireland signed Lacroix and Craig Hyland in time for the club's next match against Ballymena United. In doing so, he became the first French player to represent the club. With Hyland departing after one game, Lacroix made his debut in a 2–1 victory over Linfield in the Irish Cup on 22 January 2013.

He rapidly became a fan's favorite and Crusaders' supporters developed a chant for him during his time at Seaview; "Don't sell Lacroix", to the tune of Billy Ray Cyrus' song Achy Breaky Heart. On 1 January 2014, Lacroix joined Ballymena United on loan.

== Post-playing career ==
During his playing career, he studied a Master of Science in Sports Business at the Ulster Business School in Belfast. Shortly after graduated, he retired from professional football to join UEFA marketing agency CAA Eleven in January 2015. He now works for the commercial department of the International Olympic Committee based in Lausanne, Switzerland.

== Honours ==
=== Club ===
==== Lille ====
- UEFA Intertoto Cup: 2004

==== Étoile ====
- S.League: 2010
- Singapore League Cup: 2010

==== Tampines Rovers ====
- S.League: 2011

=== Individual ===
- S.League Golden Glove: 2010
