= Alexis Zywiecki =

French footballer (born 1984)

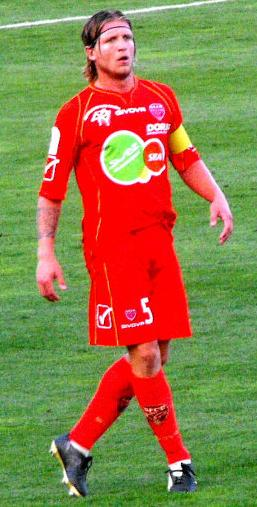

Personal information
- Date of birth: April 10, 1984 (age 42)
- Place of birth: Lesquin, France
- Height: 1.84 m (6 ft 1/2 in)
- Position: Defender

Senior career*
Years	Team	Apps	(Gls)
2003–2007	Lille	5	(0)
2006–2007	→ Dijon (loan)	6	(1)
2007–2012	Dijon	102	(4)
2012–2013	Fréjus	10	(0)
2013–	Fréjus II		
- * Club domestic league appearances and goals as of 20:37, 13 July 2012 (UTC)

Alexis Zywiecki (born April 10, 1984) is a French professional football player.

== Club career ==
Zywiecki began his career in the youth ranks of Lille. In 2006 the French defender left Lille and signed with Dijon, where he became a fixture for the club. In his first season with Dijon he appeared in 6 league matches and scored his first professional goal. During the 2007/08 season Zywiecki cemented his place as a starter and appeared in 29 matches and scored 2 goals. During the 2010/11 season Zywiecki appeared in 24 league matches as he helped Dijon gain promotion to Ligue 1.

In November 2011, Zywiecki moved to Championnat National side Étoile Fréjus Saint-Raphaël.
