= Chris Makiese =

French professional footballer (born 1987)

Personal information
- Full name: Chris Kamulete Makiese Ntinu Ntuluengani
- Date of birth: 14 October 1987 (age 39)
- Place of birth: Montfermeil, France
- Height: 1.84 m (6 ft 0 in)
- Position: Striker

Team information
- Current team: Visé
- Number: 78

Youth career
- 2003–2005: Troyes
- 2005–2006: Lille

Senior career*
Years	Team	Apps	(Gls)
2006–2009	Lille	5	(0)
2008	→ Charleroi (loan)	16	(7)
2009	→ Zulte Waregem (loan)	10	(6)
2009–2010	Zulte Waregem	29	(8)
2010–2011	Laval	18	(2)
2011–2012	Mons		
2012–2014	Visé		
- * Club domestic league appearances and goals as of 18:52, 1 December 2010 (UTC)

Chris Kamulete Makiese Ntinu Ntuluengani (born 14 October 1987) is a French former professional footballer who played as a striker.

== Career ==
Born in Montfermeil, Makiese played youth football with Troyes, before beginning his senior career with Lille during the 2006–07 season. He spent loan spells at Belgian clubs Charleroi and Zulte Waregem, before moving to Zulte Waregem on a permanent deal. He signed for Laval for the 2010–11 season. On 23 July 2011, he moved to Belgian Pro League side RAEC Mons, only to move again one season later, now to Visé.
