= Peter Franquart =

French footballer (born 1985)

Personal information
- Date of birth: 4 January 1985 (age 41)
- Place of birth: Lille, France
- Height: 1.82 m (6 ft 0 in)
- Position: Defender

Youth career
- 1997–2004: Lille

Senior career*
Years	Team	Apps	(Gls)
2004–2011	Lille	32	(2)
2009	→ Le Havre (loan)	13	(1)
2009–2010	→ Charleroi (loan)	36	(0)
2011–2014	Mons	48	(1)
2015–2016	Virton	18	(1)
Total		147	(5)

International career
2005	France U21	2	(0)
- * Club domestic league appearances and goals

Peter Franquart (born 4 January 1985) is a French former professional footballer who played as a defender.

== Career ==
Franquart began his career 1997 with Lille and played 92 games with 4 goals for the reserve, before being promoted to first team 2004. He played his first game on 20 August 2005 against Sochaux. On 8 January 2009, he was loaned out from Lille to play for Le Havre. He returned to Lille in summer 2009. On 28 August 2009, Franquart signed for Belgian club Charleroi on loan for one season.
