= Dieudonné Owona =

Cameroonian footballer (born 1986)

Personal information
- Full name: Dieudonné Owona
- Date of birth: February 28, 1986 (age 40)
- Place of birth: Yaoundé, Cameroon
- Height: 1.73 m (5 ft 8 in)
- Position: Left back

Team information
- Current team: Grande-Synthe
- Number: 12

Youth career
- 2001–2006: Lille OSC

Senior career*
Years	Team	Apps	(Gls)
2006–2007	Lille OSC	0	(0)
2007	→ FC Brussels (loan)	13	(1)
2007–2008	FC Brussels	16	(0)
2009–2010	Feignies		
2011	R.O.C. de Charleroi-Marchienne	11	(1)
2011	Grande-Synthe		
2012	Beroe Stara Zagora	5	(0)
2013–2014	Maccabi Umm al-Fahm	19	(0)
2014–2015	Tourani	7	(0)
2015–	Grande-Synthe	18	(0)
- * Club domestic league appearances and goals as of 10 April 2016

Dieudonné Owona (born February 28, 1986) is a Cameroonian footballer who plays as a defender for Grande-Synthe in France.

== Career ==
Born in Cameroon, at the age of 15 Owona moved to Lille's Academy in France.

In January 2007 Owona joined FC Brussels on loan for the duration of the 2006–07 season. He made his Belgian Pro League début in a game against R.A.E.C. Mons on 20 January; the game finished 1–1. A week later, he scored his first goal in a 2–0 home win over Zulte Waregem. Owona finished the season with 13 appearances.

Owana holds Cameroonian and French nationalities.
