= Mathieu Robail =

French footballer (born 1985)

Personal information
- Date of birth: 2 June 1985 (age 41)
- Place of birth: Cambrai, France
- Height: 1.73 m (5 ft 8 in)
- Position: Midfielder

Team information
- Current team: Lambersart (assistant)

Youth career
- US Viesly
- 1999–2000: Valenciennes
- 2000–2005: Lille

Senior career*
Years	Team	Apps	(Gls)
2005–2007	Lille	10	(0)
2004–2005	→ Wasquehal (loan)	17	(3)
2007–2010	Dijon	65	(4)
2010–2012	Bastia	66	(13)
2012–2015	Nîmes	92	(5)
2015–2016	CA Bastia	8	(0)
2016–2018	Paris FC	15	(0)
2018–2019	IC de Croix	23	(3)
2019–2020	EFAFC	16	(1)

Managerial career
- 2020: EFAFC (U17 assistant)
- 2020–2021: IC de Croix (reserves manager)
- 2021–: Lambersart (assistant)
- * Club domestic league appearances and goals

Mathieu Robail (born 2 June 1985) is a retired French professional footballer who played as a midfielder.

== Career ==
Born in Cambrai, Robail was signed by Lille as a youth player. He played for third-division side ES Wasquehal during the 2004–05 season, scoring three goals. In January 2010 he signed a six-month deal with SC Bastia after terminating his contract with Dijon.

In September 2015, Robail joined CA Bastia.

== Coaching career ==
After retiring at the end of the 2019-20 season, Mathieu Robail began his coaching career with Iris Club de Croix, where he was appointed manager of their reserve team. Prior to that, Robail had assisted Johan Jacquesson at EFAFC's U17 team. In April 2021, he took up the position as assistant coach for Lambersart. Beside that, he would also coach the clubs U18 team.

== Personal life ==
He has a twin brother, Samuel, who is also a footballer.
