= Samuel Robail =

French footballer (born 1985)

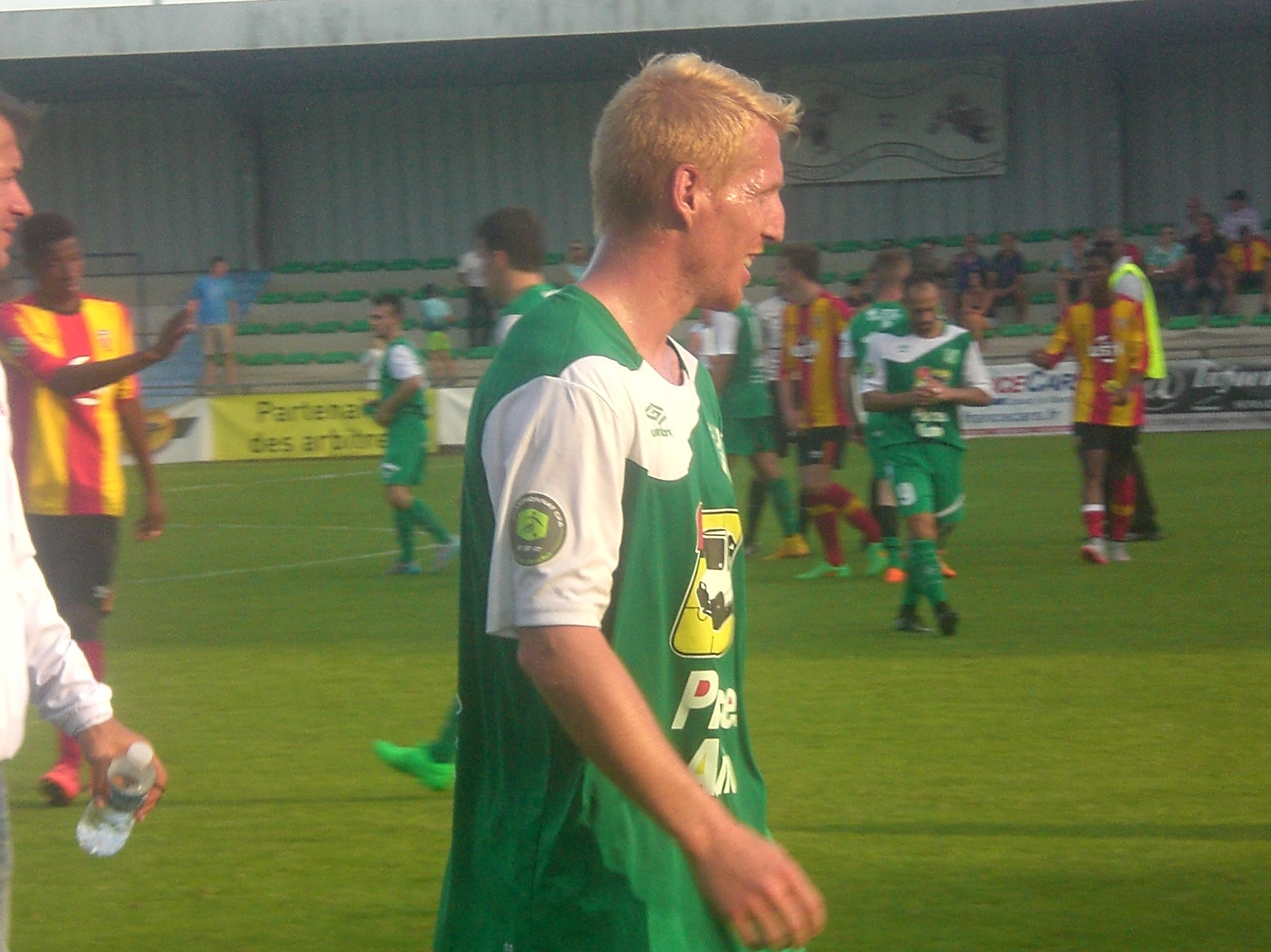
- Robail in August 2015

Personal information
- Date of birth: 2 June 1985 (age 41)
- Place of birth: Cambrai, France
- Height: 1.73 m (5 ft 8 in)
- Position: Midfielder

Team information
- Current team: Iris Club de Croix

Youth career
- 2004–2006: Lille

Senior career*
Years	Team	Apps	(Gls)
2006–2008	Lille	23	(4)
2007	→ Boulogne (loan)	16	(2)
2009–2013	Boussu Dour Borinage	100	(11)
2013–	Iris Club de Croix	153	(19)
- * Club domestic league appearances and goals as of 1 July 2019

Samuel Robail (born 2 June 1985) is a French professional footballer who plays as a midfielder for Iris Club de Croix.

== Career ==
Robail has spent time on loan with US Boulogne, he came from Lille OSC.

== Personal life ==
He is the twin brother of Mathieu Robail.
