= 2023–24 Coupe de France preliminary rounds, Hauts-de-France =

French football competition

The 2023–24 Coupe de France preliminary rounds, Hauts-de-France is the qualifying competition to decide which teams from the leagues of the Hauts-de-France region of France take part in the main competition from the seventh round.

A total of twenty-one teams will qualify from the Hauts-de-France section of the 2023–24 Coupe de France preliminary rounds.

In 2022–23, US Pays de Cassel from the sixth tier progressed to the round of 32, beating teams from one and two divisions above them, before being drawn against Paris Saint-Germain. They faced the Ligue 1 team from the capital at a Ligue 1 stadium, Stade Bollaert-Delelis, in front of a capacity crowd, but were on the wrong end of a seven-goal result.

== Draws and fixtures ==
Draws for the first two rounds were carried out separately by districts. Draws were published on 20 July 2023 (Flandres), 3 August 2023 (Escaut), 8 August 2023 (Côte d'Opale), 21 August 2023 (Artois), and 22 August 2023 (Aisne). The districts of Oise and Somme did not publish their draws separately. A total of 359 ties were drawn, with all entrants being from the district level leagues.

From the third round, the draw was integrated. The third round draw, featuring the eight teams from Championnat National 3 was broadcast live on the league's Facebook page on 8 September 2023. The fourth round draw, featuring the teams from Championnat National 2, took place on 21 September 2023. The fifth round draw took place on 5 October 2023. The sixth and final regional draw was made on 19 October 2023.

=== First round ===
These matches are from the district of Artois, and were played on 27 August 2023.

First Round Results: Hauts-de-France (Artois)
Tie no	Home team (Tier)	Score	Away team (Tier)
1.	US Gonnehem-Busnettes (11)	2–2 (1–3 p)	AS Neuvireuil-Gavrelle (12)
2.	AJ Neuville (13)	0–3 (Note: Tie won by means of forfeit.)	FC La Roupie-Isbergues (11)
3.	EC Mazingarbe (10)	1–0	AS Violaines (10)
4.	Sud Artois Foot (11)	0–4	CS Habarcq (10)
5.	AAE Aix-Noulette (11)	1–1 (4–2 p)	AS Auchy-les-Mines (12)
6.	AG Grenay (15)	0–3	AS Beaurains (11)
7.	CSAL Souchez (11)	1–0	ES Douvrin (12)
8.	ES Bois-Bernard Acheville (15)	0–3	OC Cojeul (12)
9.	AEP Verdrel (14)	3–6	RC Sains (11)
10.	FC Dainvillois (13)	0–7	Olympique Arras (10)
11.	US Lapugnoy (13)	1–2	Intrépides Norrent-Fontes (12)
12.	US Hesdigneul (11)	1–1 (4–5 p)	US Arleux-en-Gohelle (12)
13.	FC Beaumont (13)	5–3	US Houdain (11)
14.	Auchel FC (10)	1–0	FC Annay (11)
15.	AS Lyssois (13)	1–1 (2–3 p)	AS Maroeuil (11)
16.	ES Eleu (12)	0–1	Olympique Héninois (10)
17.	ASPTT Arras (14)	1–11	ES Vendin (10)
18.	SCF Achicourt (12)	1–1 (3–5 p)	FC Busnes (13)
19.	FC Tortequesne (14)	2–3	Olympique Burbure (11)
20.	Tilloy FC (13)	3–3 (6–5 p)	AS Sailly-Labourse (11)
21.	ES Haillicourt (14)	1–15	JF Guarbecque (10)
22.	US Beuvry (11)	6–3	AJ Artois (11)
23.	FC Cuinchy (14)	0–4	AC Noyelles-Godault (10)
24.	UC Divion (11)	1–1 (3–5 p)	US Lestrem (10)
25.	ES Ourton (14)	1–3	AS Kennedy Hénin-Beaumont (15)
26.	US Croisette (14)	0–6	ES Haisnes (10)
27.	RC Vaudricourt Kennedy (12)	1–1 (4–5 p)	US Croisilles (10)
28.	ES Val Sensée (12)	1–4	La Couture FC (10)
29.	FC Hauts Lens (13)	2–1	AS Barlin (12)
30.	AAE Dourges (14)	0–10	ES Laventie (10)
31.	FC Méricourt (14)	5–1	US Mondicourt (14)
32.	FC Dynamo Carvin Fosse 4 (13)	2–2 (3–2 p)	Atrébate FC (11)
33.	Entente Verquin-Béthune (12)	3–1 (Note: Tie reversed from original draw.)	RC Locon 2000 (13)
34.	FC Servins (13)	2–1	AS Quiéry-la-Motte (14)
35.	AS Loison (11)	4–1	AS Salomé (12)
36.	FC Richebourg (13)	2–2 (4–5 p)	USA Liévin (10)
37.	AS Bonnières Houvin (15)	4–0	FC Bouvigny-Boyeffles (11)
38.	FC Givenchy-en-Gohelle (13)	3–1	CS Pernes (12)
39.	AS Bapaume-Bertincourt-Vaulx-Vraucourt (12)	0–2	US Cheminots Avion (12)
40.	Stade Héninois (11)	9–0	US Ablain (12)
41.	US Maisnil (12)	3–4	US Pas-en-Artois (10)
42.	AFC Libercourtois (12)	4–0	ES Allouagne (13)
43.	FCE La Bassée (14)	3–1	FC Estevelles (14)
44.	FC Hinges (12)	3–0	USC Monchy-Breton (13)
45.	ES Ficheux (13)	2–4	FC Hersin (10)
46.	AS Pont-à-Vendin (14)	2–14	AS Lensoise (10)
47.	AAE Évin-Malmaison (13)	6–2	US Heuchin Lisbourg (14)
48.	USO Drocourt (12)	1–3	AS Tincquizel (10)
49.	Thélus FC (14)	2–2 (3–0 p)	AS Cauchy-à-la-Tour (12)
50.	Diables Rouges Lambres-lez-Aire (14)	2–9	ES Angres (10)
51.	AS Bailleul-Sir-Berthoult (13)	1–2	US Boubers-Conchy (12)
52.	Olympique Liévin (11)	2–1	AS Vallée de la Ternoise (12)
53.	AS Frévent (12)	1–1 (4–2 p)	US Grenay (10)
54.	RC Bours (15)	3–3 (3–1 p)	AS Vendin 2000 (13)
55.	US Ham-en-Artois (13)	– (Note: Match abandoned after 40 minutes, reason unknown. US Ham-en-Artois penalised, FC Camblain-Châtelain qualify.)	FC Camblain-Châtelain (11)
56.	AS Noyelles-lès-Vermelles (15)	0–8	AJ Ruitz (12)
57.	AS Courrièroise (11)	4–1	US Ruch Carvin (12)

These matches are from the district of Escaut, and were played on 27 August 2023.

First Round Results: Hauts-de-France (Escaut)
Tie no	Home team (Tier)	Score	Away team (Tier)
1.	US Sars-Poteries (13)	1–6	US Gommegnies-Carnoy (10)
2.	US Prisches (15)	0–9	US Rousies (9)
3.	JS Avesnelloise (13)	0–2	OSC Assevent (10)
4.	US Cartigny-Buire (14)	3–1	FC Leval (14)
5.	AS Bellignies (12)	3–1	Maubeuge Olympique (13)
6.	AS Trélon (11)	0–1	FC Anor (12)
7.	US Villers-Sire-Nicole (13)	6–1	AS Obies (13)
8.	US Ohain (14)	1–5	AFC Colleret (12)
9.	AS La Longueville (10)	1–3	US Beaufort/Limont-Fontaine (10)
10.	US Bousies Forest (13)	12–0	US Villers-Pol (13)
11.	US Glageon (13)	0–9	IC Ferrière-la-Grande (10)
12.	Unicité FC (14)	0–3 (Note: Tie won by means of forfeit.)	AS Recquignies (11)
13.	SC Bachant (13)	0–4	Wignehies Olympique (11)
14.	Sports Podéens Réunis (10)	4–1	AFC Ferrière-la-Petite (11)
15.	FC Aunelle (14)	1–2	AS Douzies (10)
16.	FC Jenlain (14)	1–6	AG Solrézienne (10)
17.	AS Étrœungt (12)	1–5	US Jeumont (10)
18.	SC Saint-Remy-du Nord (12)	3–1	US Landrecies (13)
19.	SCEPS Pont-sur-Sambre (12)	1–4	ASJ Montplaisir (11)
20.	FC Saulzoir (11)	7–1	Olympique Saint-Ollois (12)
21.	RC Élincourt (15)	4–3	FC Solesmes (11)
22.	US Rumilly (12)	1–2	US Saint-Aubert (11)
23.	AS Neuvilly (12)	1–4	FC Iwuy (10)
24.	US Les Rues-des-Vignes (11)	2–0	US Quievy (10)
25.	AS Thun-l'Évêque (13)	2–6	AO Hermies (10)
26.	US Beauvois Fontaine (11)	2–1	ES Paillencourt-Estrun (10)
27.	US Briastre (12)	1–10	US Bertry-Clary (12)
28.	ASE Metz-en-Couture (15)	3–8	SCO Marquion Bourlon Épinoy (12)
29.	OC Avesnois (11)	2–2 (1–3 p)	FC Neuville-Saint-Rémy (11)
30.	US Fontaine-Notre-Dame (11)	1–2	SC Le Cateau (10)
31.	ACRS Portugaise Cambrai (13)	4–4 (5–4 p)	US Busigny (14)
32.	US Viesly (13)	0–3	US Walincourt-Selvigny (10)
33.	FC Fontaine-au-Bois (11)	3–1	US Saint-Souplet (11)
34.	SS Marcoing (12)	1–1 (3–2 p)	AS Masnières (11)
35.	FC Pecquencourt (14)	0–2	UF Anhiers (11)
36.	AS Douai-Lambres Cheminots (13)	– (Note: AS Douai-Lambres Cheminots penalised, Olympic Marchiennois qualify. Original scoreline unknown.)	Olympic Marchiennois (11)
37.	Fenain ES (13)	1–1 (5–4 p)	US Corbehem (11)
38.	FC Minier Lewardois (14)	1–4	US Raimbeaucourt (10)
39.	FC Monchecourt (14)	0–1 (Note: FC Roost-Warendin penalised for fielding a suspended player, FC Monchecourt qualify.)	FC Roost-Warendin (11)
40.	Olympique Landasien (13)	2–4	OSC Loffre (13)
41.	AS Cuincy (12)	0–12	US Auberchicourt (11)
42.	DC Lallaing (12)	1–2	US Aubigny-au-Bac (12)
43.	RC Lécluse (12)	5–1	FC Bruille-lez-Marchiennes (13)
44.	FC Écaillon (14)	5–2	AS Courchelettes (13)
45.	US Pecquencourt (12)	0–2	US Aubygeoise (10)
46.	US Esquerchin (13)	1–6	Dechy Sports (13)
47.	US Frais Marais (11)	1–5	US Pays de Sensée et d'Ostrevent (12)
48.	US Hergnies (12)	0–4	FC Lecelles-Rosult (10)
49.	RC Thiant (14)	5–0	ES Bouchain (11)
50.	FC Hasnon-Millonfosse (12)	4–2	EA Prouvy (10)
51.	USM Beuvrages (11)	2–2 (3–4 p)	Douchy FC (10)
52.	AS Artres (12)	2–2 (3–0 p)	AFC Escautpont (10)
53.	JS Abscon (11)	3–3 (3–5 p)	Saint-Waast CFC (12)
54.	FC Saultain (12)	1–8	Olympique Onnaingeois (9)
55.	Stade Fresnois (12)	0–4	CO Trith-Saint-Léger (10)
56.	AS Petite-Forêt (13)	4–2	FC Haspres (12)
57.	Hérin Aubry CLE (12)	2–3 (Note: AS Château-l'Abbaye penalised for fielding a suspended player, Hérin Aubry CLE qualify.)	AS Château-l'Abbaye (11)
58.	ES Mastaing Wavrechain (15)	1–4	US Verchain-Maugré (12)
59.	AS Wavrechain-sous-Denain (14)	2–7	Anzin FARC (10)
60.	Inter Condé-sur-l'Escaut (13)	2–2 (5–6 p)	US Brillon (14)
61.	ES Sebourg-Estreux (12)	5–0	US Quiévrechain (13)
62.	ES Noyelles-sur-Selle (13)	0–1	Vieux Condé Foot (10)
63.	Olympique Thun (14)	3–5	FC Famars (10)
64.	RC Rœulx (11)	3–2	US Haulchin (12)
65.	AS Vendegies-Escarmain (11)	0–5	JO Wallers-Arenberg (10)
66.	US Crespin (14)	0–4	ÉS Crespin (11)
67.	Neuville OSC (12)	0–0 (4–3 p)	FC Condé-Macou (12)

These matches are from the district of Flandres, and were played on 27 August 2023.

First Round Results: Hauts-de-France (Flandres)
Tie no	Home team (Tier)	Score	Away team (Tier)
1.	Football Saint-Michel Quesnoy (11)	1–6	FC Lille Sud (9)
2.	US Marquillies (12)	2–0	OC Roubaisien (9)
3.	ACS Comines (10)	1–0	USCC Saint-Pol-sur-Mer (9)
4.	ES Mouvalloise (9)	4–0	ES Lille Louvière Pellevoisin (10)
5.	AS Vieux Lille (12)	0–3	FC Méteren (10)
6.	AS Templeuve-en-Pévèle (9)	2–1	AS Baisieux Patro (9)
7.	AJL Caestre (13)	3–7	OSM Lomme (11)
8.	Lille AFS Guinée (12)	2–2 (3–4 p)	AS Albeck Grande-Synthe (10)
9.	ASC Hazebrouck (9)	1–4	US Leffrinckoucke (9)
10.	AS Bersée (10)	1–0	US Téteghem (9)
11.	CS EIC Tourcoing (11)	1–3	US Wattrelos (9)
12.	UFC Nieppois (11)	4–1	Wattrelos FC (10)
13.	AG Thumeries (11)	0–0 (5–3 p)	Faches-Thumesnil FC (9)
14.	FC Morin (12)	1–0	FC Santes (9)
15.	FC Rosendaël (10)	1–2	Bac-Sailly Sports (11)
16.	FC Grande-Synthe (13)	5–5 (4–2 p)	US Lederzeele (12)
17.	Prémesques FC (11)	1–3	ASF Looberghe-Holque-Cappelle Brouck de la Colme (11)
18.	Hondschoote FC (11)	0–2	US Maritime (11)
19.	US Bray-Dunes (11)	1–6	Olympique Hémois FC (9)
20.	FC Wahagnies (13)	0–6	Sailly Forest Foot (11)
21.	AS Pont de Nieppe (11)	2–2 (4–5 p)	US Fretin (10)
22.	US Fleurbaix (14)	7–0	ASF Coudekerque (12)
23.	Entente Mouchin Bachy (12)	2–6	US Attiches (12)
24.	US Hondeghem (11)	2–2 (2–3 p) (Note: Tie reversed from original draw.)	AS Marcq (14)
25.	ES Wormhout (11)	4–2	EC Houplines (9)
26.	FA Blanc Seau (11)	4–3	US Phalempin (10)
27.	ES Capelloise (10)	1–1 (4–2 p)	CG Haubourdin (9)
28.	Stade Lezennois (10)	3–1	SM Petite-Synthe (9)
29.	FC Templemars-Vendeville (10)	2–3	ES Ennequin-Loos (10)
30.	Crous FC Lille (13)	0–3 (Note: Tie won by means of forfeit.)	US Warhem (10)
31.	Fort-Mardyck OC (9)	0–3	ES Genech (9)
32.	US Wervicquoise (12)	0–4	SR Lomme Délivrance (10)
33.	FC Bierne (13)	6–0	AF Deux-Synthe (12)
34.	AAJ Uxem (11)	1–1 (3–5 p)	EAC Cysoing-Wannehain-Bourghelles (9)
35.	Olympic Hallennois (10)	0–2	FC Steene (11)
36.	FC La Chapelle-d'Armentières (10)	4–1	ASC Roubaix (11)
37.	FC Le Doulieu (10)	2–0	FC Annœullin (9)
38.	US Monts de Flandre (10)	2–1	UJS Cheminots de Tourcoing (11)
39.	AO Sainghinoise (9)	0–3	JS Lille Wazemmes (9)
40.	ES Weppes (10)	3–1	USF Coudekerque (10)
41.	FC Bauvin (10)	5–2	ACS Hoymille (11)
42.	US Antillais Lille Métropole (12)	2–3	JS Steenwerck (10)
43.	FC Colmar Armentières (13)	9–0	AS Rexpoëde (12)
44.	US Houplin-Ancoisne (11)	3–0	US Estaires (11)
45.	Toufflers AF (10)	4–1	EC Camphin-en-Pévèle (11)
46.	ES Cappelle Pont à Marcq (13)	2–3	JS Ghyveldoise (10)
47.	AS Usines Dunkerque (13)	2–6	FC Mons-en-Barœul (11)
48.	AS Saint-Joseph Hazebrouck (12)	0–1	US Yser (10)
49.	RC Bois-Blancs Lille (12)	6–3	US Wallon-Cappel (11)
50.	CS Bousbecque (9)	2–1	AS Radinghem (10)
51.	US Ronchin (9)	1–0	FC Wambrechies (10)
52.	CS Gondecourt (11)	0–0 (9–8 p)	Olympique Mérignies (12)
53.	FC Craywick (14)	0–4	RC Herzeele (11)
54.	FC Vieux-Berquin (10)	2–0	Flers OS Villeneuve d'Ascq (9)

These matches are from the district of Côte d'Opale, and were played on 27 August 2023.

First Round Results: Hauts-de-France (Côte d'Opale)
Tie no	Home team (Tier)	Score	Away team (Tier)
1.	Éclair Neufchâtel-Hardelot (9)	1–1 (4–5 p)	Verton FC (9)
2.	FC Ecques-Heuringhem (12)	1–4	US Quiestède (10)
3.	US Dannes (11)	0–1	FC Wavrans-sur-l'Aa (12)
4.	AS Rang-du-Fliers (11)	2–1	AS Esquerdes (12
5.	ES Herbelles-Pihem-Inghem (12)	3–3 (5–4 p)	AS Fruges (11)
6.	ES Boisdinghem-Zudausques-Mentque-Nortbécourt (14)	2–1	FC Setques (12)
7.	US Bomy (13)	1–5	Gouy-Saint-André RC (10)
8.	US Humbert (14)	2–4	CS Watten (9)
9.	US Alquines (11)	7–3	AS Crémarest (12)
10.	US Créquy-Fressin (11)	1–1 (4–5 p)	ES Roquetoire (10)
11.	Entente Steenbecque Morbecque (13)	5–0	FC Thiembronne (14)
12.	AS Portelois (14)	1–12	FC Saint-Martin-lez-Tatinghem (9)
13.	US Verchocq-Ergny-Herly (10)	2–4	ES Licques (10)
14.	AS Bezinghem (10)	1–2	AS Campagne-lès-Hesdin (10)
15.	ES Mametz (12)	1–3	AS Surques-Escœuilles (10)
16.	AC Tubersent (13)	2–6	Lys Aa FC (10)
17.	JS Racquinghem (11)	2–2 (3–4 p)	ES Helfaut (10)
18.	FC Nordausques (11)	1–1 (6–5 p)	FC Merlimont (10)
19.	JS Heuringhem (14)	0–0 (4–2 p)	JS Renescuroise (11)
20.	AS Fillièvres (13)	2–3	US Frencq (11)
21.	RC Samer (11)	3–1	US Thérouanne (12)
22.	FC Senlecques (13)	0–1	FC Wardrecques (10)
23.	FC Hucqueliers (14)	1–5	ES Saint-Omer Rural (10)
24.	US Équihen-Plage (10)	1–1 (1–3 p)	FCP Blendecques (9)
25.	US Vieil-Hesdin (14)	5–1	US Coyecques (13)
26.	FC Landrethun-lez-Ardres (14)	0–3	FC Sangatte (11)
27.	SO Calais (11)	2–3	FC Capellois (10)
28.	FC Bellebrune (15)	1–9	US Ambleteuse (10)
29.	US Polincove (13)	2–5	US Elinghen-Ferques (13)
30.	FC Les Attaques (13)	2–2 (1–3 p)	RC Bréquerecque Ostrohove (10)
31.	FC Offekerque (14)	1–5	US Marquise (9)
32.	Amicale Balzac (13)	0–3	RC Ardrésien (10)
33.	Le Portel GPF (13)	1–4	FC Calais Caténa (10)
34.	AS Tournehem (11)	1–3	FC Conti (12)
35.	US Hesdin-l'Abbé (12)	3–0	US Hardinghen (12)
36.	USC Wierre-Effroy (12)	1–4	Entente Calais (10)
37.	RC Brêmes-les-Ardres (13)	0–8	US Landrethun-le-Nord (10)
38.	Longuenesse Malafoot (13)	0–3	ASL Vieil-Moutier La Calique (11)
39.	ASEP Saint-Inglevert (12)	2–3	ES Guînes (11)
40.	AS Colembert (12)	3–3 (4–3 p)	US Porteloise (13)
41.	AS Balinghem (13)	1–6	FLC Longfossé (10)
42.	ESL Boulogne-sur-Mer (9)	1–1 (2–4 p)	JS Condette (9)
43.	FC Fréthun (11)	2–5	ES Oye-Plage (11)
44.	JS Bonningues-lès-Ardres (13)	1–1 (4–2 p)	Amicale Pont-de-Briques (10)
45.	CAP Le Portel (11)	0–7	FC Campagne-lès-Guines (10)
46.	USM Boulogne-sur-Mer (12)	4–2	AS Saint-Tricat et Nielles (12)
47.	FC Wissant (14)	2–2 (3–5 p)	AL Camiers (12)
48.	Calais Courgain (14)	7–3	ADF Ruminghem (14)
49.	US Rety (14)	1–5	US Marais de Gûines (11)
50.	FC Bonningues-lès-Calais (13)	1–3	CO Wimille (9)

These matches are from the district of Aisne, and were played on 27 August 2023.

First Round Results: Hauts-de-France (Aisne)
Tie no	Home team (Tier)	Score	Away team (Tier)
1.	FC Courmelles (10)	2–2 (3–1 p)	US La Fère (10)
2.	FJEP Coincy (11)	4–2	FC Vierzy (11)
3.	FC Frières-Faillouël (13)	2–4	ES Viry-Noureuil (11)
4.	Union Sud Aisne FC (11)	6–2	FC Bucy-le-Long (11)
5.	AS Barenton-Bugny (12)	0–3	US Chemin des Dames (11)
6.	AS Marly-Gomont (12)	4–2	ES Bucilly-Landouzy-Éparcy (12)
7.	CS Blérancourt (12)	0–3 (Note: Tie won by means of forfeit.)	FC Lesdins (12)
8.	US Vallée de l'Ailette (11)	1–4 (Note: IEC Château-Thierry penalised for fielding a suspended player, US Vallée de l'Ailette qualify.)	IEC Château-Thierry (9)
9.	AS Milonaise Faverolles (11)	4–1 (Note: Tie reversed from original draw.)	US Belleu (12)
10.	AS Tupigny (11)	3–0	AS Seraucourt-le-Grand (12)
11.	SC Flavy (12)	0–1	US Seboncourt (10)
12.	US des Vallées (10)	1–1 (5–6 p)	US Venizel (11)
13.	ADP Soissons (13)	2–1	AS Breny-Oulchy (13)
14.	AS Martigny (12)	2–4	US Vervins (10)
15.	SC Montaigu (13)	1–3	Chambry FC (12)
16.	FC Saint-Martin Étreillers (11)	0–5	NES Boué-Étreux (11)
17.	US Étreaupont (13)	0–0 (2–4 p)	ESUS Buironfosse-La Capelle (10)
18.	Coveronnais SC (12)	2–4	CSO Athies (11)
19.	Le Nouvion AC (10)	1–0	RC Homblières (13)
20.	US Brissy-Hamégicourt (12)	0–9	FFC Chéry-lès-Pouilly (10)
21.	US Aulnois-sous-Laon (10)	10–0 (Note: US Aulnois-sous-Laon penalised for fielding a suspended player, US Crépy Vivaise qualify.)	US Crépy Vivaise (11)
22.	ACSF Vic-sur-Aisne (13)	3–5	US Anizy Pinon (12)
23.	AS Effry (13)	1–3	US Rozoy-sur-Serre (11)
24.	Étaves-et-Bocquiaux FC (12)	2–4	FC Hannapes (10)
25.	AS Pavant (12)	2–6	Entente Crouy-Cuffies (10)
26.	US Origny-Thenelles (13)	0–9	AFC Holnon-Fayet (9)
27.	FC Watigny (12)	3–3 (2–4 p)	CS Aubenton (12)
28.	ASA Mont Notre-Dame (12)	0–19	Les Carlésiens FC (13)
29.	CS Montescourt-Lizerolles (13)	0–10	FC Vaux-Andigny (12)
30.	ASPTT Laon (10)	4–1 (Note: FC Moncelien penalised for fielding a suspended player. Result amended to 4–0. ASPTT Laon qualify.)	FC Moncelien (11)
31.	US Neuve-Maison (13)	6–2	AS Ohis (13)
32.	ES Sequehart-Fonsomme-Levergies (12)	1–1 (3–4 p)	Gouy FC (13)
33.	AS Nouvionnaise (12)	1–1 (2–3 p)	L'Arsenal Club Achery-Beautor-Charmes (11)
34.	FC Gandelu Dammard (13)	0–6	ASA Presles (10)
35.	La Concorde de Bucy-les-Pierrepont (11)	3–3 (4–3 p)	ALJN Sinceny (12)
36.	Marle Sports (10)	0–0 (3–2 p)	ASC Saint-Michel (10)
37.	RC Condé (12)	2–4	UA Fère-en-Tardenois (10)
38.	FC Amigny-Rouy (12)	0–6	FC Essigny-le-Grand (10)

These matches are from the district of Somme, and were played on 26 and 27 August 2023.

First Round Results: Hauts-de-France (Somme)
Tie no	Home team (Tier)	Score	Away team (Tier)
1.	AS Rue (14)	0–6	Olympique Eaucourtois (11)
2.	Harbonnières SC (14)	0–1	FC Pont de Metz (13)
3.	FC Méaulte (10)	4–0	FC Plessier (12)
4.	FC Grouches-Luchuel (14)	4–2	US Cartigny-Buire (13)
5.	ASL Saveuse (13)	2–0	Rumigny FC (13)
6.	Olympique Monchy-Lagache (12)	0–4	US Hangest-en-Serre (12)
7.	ES Licourt (12)	0–4	AS Querrieu (10)
8.	AS Domart-sur-la-Luce (12)	0–3 (Note: Tie won by means of forfeit.)	US Sailly-Saillisel (10)
9.	AS Heudicourt (13)	0–3	ASM Rivery (12)
10.	SC Fouilloy (13)	1–3	FC Blangy-Tronville (10)
11.	AAE Bray-sur-Somme (13)	2–1	US Roisel (12)
12.	US Beauquesne (none)	0–3	ES Cagny (10)
13.	ES Vers-sur-Selle (13)	2–4	US Marchélepot (10)
14.	Boves SC (13)	2–5	Association Cardonnette Football (12)
15.	US Marcelcave (12)	0–4	ES Sainte-Emilie/Épehy-le-Ronss (11)
16.	AS Cerisy (11)	4–1	US Daours Vecquemont Bussy Aubigny (10)
17.	AS Prouzel-Plachy (12)	1–2	ES Roye-Damery (11)
18.	AS Glisy (10)	4–2 (Note: Tie reversed from original draw.)	Amiens Picardie FC (12)
19.	RC 2 Ercheu (13)	2–0	FC Estrées-Mons (12)
20.	US Allonville (13)	0–3	ES Pigeonnier Amiens (11)
21.	FR Englebelmer (10)	5–2	Olympique Amiénois (10)
22.	Amiens FC (12)	3–0	USC Moislains (11)
23.	US Ham (11)	2–1	Fraternelle Ailly-sur-Noye (10)
24.	US Méricourt l'Abbé (13)	0–8	ES Sains/Saint-Fuscien (11)
25.	AAE Feuquières-en-Vimeu (13)	2–2 (4–2 p)	AS Arrest (12)
26.	AS Maisnières (13)	5–3	Avenir de l'Étoile (12)
27.	AC Hallencourt (12)	1–5	Avenir Nouvion-en-Ponthieu (10)
28.	AS Hautvillers-Ouville (13)	5–2	JS Cambron (14)
29.	SEP Blangy-Bouttencourt (11)	1–5	ABC2F Candas (10)
30.	AS Talmas Picardie Fienvillers (12)	0–9	ES Chépy (10)
31.	FR Millencourt-en-Ponthieu (12)	0–2	US Quend (11)
32.	US Bouillancourt-en-Sery (13)	0–8	AS Quesnoy-le-Montant (12)
33.	AS Yvrench-Yvrencheux-Gapennes (13)	0–3	US Lignières-Châtelain (10)
34.	CS Crécy-en-Ponthieu (11)	4–1	CS Amiens Montières Étouvie (10)
35.	AS Namps-Maisnil (11)	0–2	FC Mareuil-Caubert (9)
36.	SC Bernaville-Prouville (12)	1–2	FC Oisemont (10)
37.	AS Picquigny (13)	0–8	ASIC Bouttencourt (10)
38.	AS Vismes au Val (11)	0–4	US Abbeville (10)
39.	AS Long (13)	5–2	US Le Crotoy (11)
40.	US Le Boisle (12)	4–0	Entente Sailly-Flibeaucourt Le Titre (11)
41.	AS La Chaussée-Tirancourt (14)	2–5	US Béthencourt-sur-Mer (10)
42.	US Vron (13)	1–1 (2–3 p)	SC Pont-Remy (10)
43.	Fienvillers FC (13)	2–4	Association Longpré-Long-Condé (12)
44.	Amiens AF (11)	2–1	US Flesselles (10)
45.	ES Harondel (11)	3–3 (3–1 p)	AS Menchecourt-Thuison-La Bouvaque (11)
46.	SSEP Martainneville (12)	0–4	Mers AC (11)
47.	Olympique Belloy-sur-Somme (12)	5–0	USC Portugais Saint-Ouen (12)
48.	Football Dreuillois (12)	0–4	AS Saint-Sauveur 80 (10)
49.	US Neuilly-l'Hôpital (11)	16–0	CO Woignarue (11)

These matches are from the district of Oise, and were played on 27 August 2023.

First Round Results: Hauts-de-France (Oise)
Tie no	Home team (Tier)	Score	Away team (Tier)
1.	FC Saint-Just des Marais (10)	2–1	ES Formerie (10)
2.	AS Cheminots Chambly (13)	3–1	FC Nointel (10)
3.	US Marseille-en-Beauvaisis (10)	1–1 (4–2 p)	JS Moliens (11)
4.	US Lieuvillers (10)	4–3	AS Coye-la-Forêt (10)
5.	AS Tracy-le-Mont (10)	1–2	Tricot OS (11)
6.	FC Cauffry (9)	2–3	FCJ Noyon (9)
7.	FC Talmontiers (13)	1–3 (Note: RC Précy penalised for fielding an ineligible player, FC Talmontiers qualify.)	RC Précy (11)
8.	FC Chiry Ourscamp (11)	1–1 (3–5 p)	FC Boran (11)
9.	AS Saint-Sauveur (Oise) (10)	6–2	AS Beaulieu Écuvilly (12)
10.	US Étouy-Agnetz-Bulles (10)	2–5	AS Verderel-lès-Sauqueuse (11)
11.	AS La Neuville-en-Hez (11)	2–1	SC Songeons (9)
12.	FC Sacy-Saint Martin (11)	1–3	US Estrées-Saint-Denis (9)
13.	CSM Mesnil-en-Thelle (12)	2–0	EFC Dieudonné Puiseux (11)
14.	AS Noailles-Cauvigny (10)	1–3	JS Thieux (11)
15.	CS Haudivillers (11)	1–1 (1–3 p)	FC Fontainettes Saint-Aubin (10)
16.	FC Bellovaques (11)	4–1	SCC Sérifontaine (10)
17.	FC Salency (12)	2–4	US Breuil-le-Sec (10)
18.	JS Guiscard (10)	5–1	US Verberie (10)
19.	ESC Wavignies (12)	1–2	US Baugy Monchy Humières (11)
20.	JSA Compiègne-La Croix-Saint Ouen (9)	4–2	AS Maignelay-Montigny (10)
21.	Entente Compiègne Olympique/GEC Clos des Roses (13)	5–0	US Pont-l'Évêque Oise (13)
22.	ES Remy (11)	11–2	AS Saint-Remy-en-l'Eau (12)
23.	AJ Laboissière-en-Thelle (10)	1–7	AS La Neuville-sur-Oudeuil (11)
24.	AS Bornel (11)	0–1	US Saint-Germer-de-Fly (11)
25.	SC Les Marettes (13)	4–4 (3–4 p)	AS Hénonville (11)
26.	US Crèvecœur-le-Grand (10)	4–1	FC Tillé (11)
27.	FC Bulles (13)	0–2	USR Saint-Crépin-Ibouvillers (9)
28.	US Paillart (11)	0–2	FC Angy (10)
29.	FC Clairoix (10)	1–3	Stade Ressontois (10)
30.	ÉS Thiers-sur-Thève (12)	2–0	Rollot AC (12)
31.	US Nanteuil FC (12)	12–1	AS Laigneville (13)
32.	CA Venette (10)	4–0	FC Carlepont (11)
33.	AS Silly-le-Long (10)	1–2	FC Ruraville (11)
34.	AS Ons-en-Bray (12)	2–6	FC Esches Fosseuse (10)
35.	AFC Nogent-sur-Oise (12)	0–2	Dynamo Canly Lonueil (9)
36.	US Froissy (11)	4–0	RC Blargies (12)
37.	Fleury SL (12)	1–4	AS Monchy-Saint-Éloi (12)
38.	RC Creil Agglo (11)	0–3 (Note: Match abandoned after 90 minutes, due to a pitch invasion. RC Creil Agglo penalised, AS Auneuil qualify.)	AS Auneuil (9)
39.	US Attichy (13)	1–8	AS Plailly (9)
40.	AF Trie-Château (12)	3–1	US Mouy (11)
41.	AS Campremy/Noyers (12)	9–1	ÉC Villers/Bailleul (12)
42.	FC Jouy-sous-Thelle (13)	1–5	FC Lavilletertre (12)
43.	AS Mareuil-sur-Ourcq (13)	0–3 (Note: Tie won by means of forfeit.)	AS Multien (10)
44.	FC Le Meux (12)	2–4	SC Lamotte Breuil (10)

=== Second round ===
These matches are from the district of Artois, and were played on 3 September 2023.

Second Round Results: Hauts-de-France (Artois)
Tie no	Home team (Tier)	Score	Away team (Tier)
1.	FCE La Bassée (14)	0–7	ES Bully-les-Mines (7)
2.	FC Busnes (13)	2–4	AJ Ruitz (12)
3.	USO Lens (9)	0–3	Stade Béthunois (6)
4.	AAE Évin-Malmaison (13)	0–6	FC La Roupie-Isbergues (11)
5.	AFCL Liebaut (8)	6–1	US Monchy-au-Bois (10)
6.	Tilloy FC (13)	1–1 (7–6 p)	USA Liévin (10)
7.	FC Hinges (12)	0–3	AS Brebières (9)
8.	US Pas-en-Artois (10)	2–0	Auchel FC (10)
9.	FC Beaumont (13)	1–0	ES Agny (11)
10.	AAE Aix-Noulette (11)	2–1	ES Sainte-Catherine (9)
11.	FC Hauts Lens (13)	5–2 (Note: FC Hauts Lens penalised for fielding too many transferred players, Olympique Burbure qualify.)	Olympique Burbure (11)
12.	Olympique Liévin (11)	2–5	JS Écourt-Saint-Quentin (7)
13.	SC Fouquières (11)	2–1	AS Beaurains (11)
14.	US Arleux-en-Gohelle (12)	2–4	AFC Libercourtois (12)
15.	FC Méricourt (14)	2–6	US Beuvry (11)
16.	Arras FA (6)	2–2 (5–4 p)	OS Aire-sur-la-Lys (7)
17.	Thélus FC (14)	1–7	AS Lensoise (10)
18.	Intrépides Norrent-Fontes (12)	0–2	AC Noyelles-Godault (10)
19.	US Boubers-Conchy (12)	1–1 (4–2 p)	US Lestrem (10)
20.	OC Cojeul (12)	0–12	USO Meurchin (8)
21.	AS Frévent (12)	2–4	CS Diana Liévin (9)
22.	FC Dynamo Carvin Fosse 4 (13)	1–1 (3–4 p)	CSAL Souchez (11)
23.	FC Hersin (10)	2–2 (2–4 p)	Olympique Héninois (10)
24.	AS Kennedy Hénin-Beaumont (15)	4–7	Stade Héninois (11)
25.	AS Neuvireuil-Gavrelle (12)	0–6	US Biachoise (6)
26.	La Couture FC (10)	1–0	ESD Isbergues (8)
27.	AS Maroeuil (11)	4–1	JF Mazingarbe (11)
28.	RC Bours (15)	0–5	FC Lillers (10)
29.	CS Habarcq (10)	0–2	ES Labeuvrière (9)
30.	UAS Harnes (9)	2–7	CS Avion (6)
31.	US Croisilles (10)	1–3	FC Montigny-en-Gohelle (8)
32.	SC Artésien (9)	3–1	US Annezin (9)
33.	US Cheminots Avion (12)	0–5	US Rouvroy (9)
34.	FC Givenchy-en-Gohelle (13)	3–0	Entente Verquin-Béthune (12)
35.	ES Angres (10)	3–3 (4–3 p)	US Billy-Berclau (9)
36.	RC Sains (11)	0–1	EC Mazingarbe (10)
37.	AS Tincquizel (10)	2–4	AS Loison (11)
38.	FC Servins (13)	1–4	RC Labourse (9)
39.	US Saint-Maurice Loos-en-Gohelle (8)	1–1 (3–4 p)	SC Pro Patria Wingles (8)
40.	ES Saint-Laurent-Blangy (9)	1–1 (4–5 p)	US Nœux-les-Mines (6)
41.	Olympique Arras (10)	2–3	AS Sainte-Barbe-Oignies (8)
42.	ES Vendin (10)	– (Note: Match abandoned after 80 minutes due to a pitch invasion and fighting on the pitch. ES Vendin penalised, Carabiniers Billy-Montigny qualify.)	Carabiniers Billy-Montigny (7)
43.	US Vermelles (8)	3–0	OS Annequin (9)
44.	AS Bonnières Houvin (15)	2–2 (3–2 p) (Note: AS Bonnières Houvin penalised for fielding too many transferred players, US Izel-lès-Équerchin qualify.)	US Izel-lès-Équerchin (12)
45.	Espérance Calonne Liévin (9)	3–1	COS Marles-Lozinghem (8)
46.	AS Courrièroise (11)	1–2	ES Anzin-Saint-Aubin (7)
47.	SC Saint-Nicolas-lez-Arras (8)	2–3	US Courcelles (8)
48.	USO Bruay-la-Buissière (8)	0–1	Calonne-Ricouart FC Cite 6 (8)
49.	ES Haisnes (10)	0–2	US Saint-Pol-sur-Ternoise (8)
50.	JF Guarbecque (10)	1–3	ES Laventie (10)
51.	FC Camblain-Châtelain (11)	0–6	US Noyelles-sous-Lens (7)

These matches are from the district of Escaut, and were played on 2 and 3 September 2023.

Second Round Results: Hauts-de-France (Escaut)
Tie no	Home team (Tier)	Score	Away team (Tier)
1.	FC Anor (12)	1–2	US Jeumont (10)
2.	ASG Louvroil (9)	3–3 (5–6 p)	OSC Assevent (10)
3.	US Rousies (9)	0–0 (3–5 p)	AS Hautmont (8)
4.	US Gommegnies-Carnoy (10)	2–0	AG Solrézienne (10)
5.	US Beaufort/Limont-Fontaine (10)	7–0	Wignehies Olympique (11)
6.	ASJ Montplaisir (11)	1–3	AS Douzies (10)
7.	AFC Colleret (12)	3–2 (Note: Tie reversed from original draw.)	US Villers-Sire-Nicole (13)
8.	US Bavay (8)	6–2	US Cousolre (9)
9.	Sports Podéens Réunis (10)	0–0 (2–4 p)	FC Marpent (6)
10.	US Cartigny-Buire (14)	1–4	FC Avesnes-sur-Helpe (8)
11.	SC Saint-Remy-du Nord (12)	0–6	Olympique Maroilles (9)
12.	AS Bellignies (12)	0–8	US Berlaimont (9)
13.	IC Ferrière-la-Grande (10)	1–3	US Fourmies (7)
14.	US Bousies Forest (13)	0–2	US Maubeuge (6)
15.	AS Recquignies (11)	2–3	ES Boussois (9)
16.	US Walincourt-Selvigny (10)	0–3	US Beauvois Fontaine (11)
17.	SC Le Cateau (10)	1–3	ES Villers-Outréaux (8)
18.	SS Marcoing (12)	1–4	Entente Ligny/Olympique Caullery (9)
19.	FC Neuville-Saint-Rémy (11)	3–2	US Les Rues-des-Vignes (11)
20.	AO Hermies (10)	0–2	FC Saulzoir (11)
21.	FC Fontaine-au-Bois (11)	4–1	ACRS Portugaise Cambrai (13)
22.	OM Cambrai Amérique (9)	1–5	ES Caudry (7)
23.	RC Élincourt (15)	0–5	CAS Escaudœuvres (7)
24.	FC Iwuy (10)	1–4	AC Cambrai (6)
25.	US Saint-Aubert (11)	1–3	US Bertry-Clary (12)
26.	SCO Marquion Bourlon Épinoy (12)	0–6	FC Provillois (9)
27.	US Auberchicourt (11)	1–1 (7–6 p)	US Pont Flers (9)
28.	US Raimbeaucourt (10)	0–1	US Aubygeoise (10)
29.	AS Sin-le-Noble (9)	0–5	Stade Orchésien (8)
30.	FC Masny (9)	3–3 (1–3 p)	FC Férin (9)
31.	RC Lécluse (12)	2–3	FC Les Epis (8)
32.	Fenain ES (13)	0–10	ES Lambresienne (6)
33.	Olympique Senséen (9)	3–1 (Note: Olympique Senséen penalised for fielding a suspended player, AS Beuvry-la-Forêt qualify.)	AS Beuvry-la-Forêt (9)
34.	OSC Loffre (13)	3–2	US Erre-Hornaing (8)
35.	Olympic Marchiennois (11)	0–3	AEF Leforest (9)
36.	Olympique Flinois (9)	2–1	SC Aniche (9)
37.	Dechy Sports (13)	0–3	SC Guesnain (9)
38.	FC Écaillon (14)	0–12	US Escaudain (6)
39.	FC Monchecourt (14)	0–15	SC Douai (8)
40.	US Pays de Sensée et d'Ostrevent (12)	0–2	US Mineurs Waziers (7)
41.	US Aubigny-au-Bac (12)	1–3	ESM Hamel (9)
42.	UF Anhiers (11)	3–2	USAC Somain (9)
43.	AS Artres (12)	3–7	Douchy FC (10)
44.	Saint-Saulve Football (9)	0–4	FC Raismes (7)
45.	Hérin Aubry CLE (12)	1–2	FC Quarouble (8)
46.	RC Thiant (14)	2–3	AS Summer Club Valenciennes (9)
47.	FC Hasnon-Millonfosse (12)	6–0	Bruay Sports (9)
48.	IC La Sentinelle (8)	5–1	Maing FC (8)
49.	Olympique Onnaingeois (9)	0–3 (Note: US Aulnoy penalised for fielding a suspended player, Olympique Onnaingeois qualify.)	US Aulnoy (9)
50.	US Brillon (14)	1–3	FC Lecelles-Rosult (10)
51.	Neuville OSC (12)	2–2 (5–6 p)	Anzin FARC (10)
52.	ES Sebourg-Estreux (12)	3–3 (3–4 p)	Vieux Condé Foot (10)
53.	RC Rœulx (11)	1–5	USM Marly (8)
54.	ÉS Crespin (11)	0–7	US Hordain (8)
55.	JO Wallers-Arenberg (10)	2–2 (5–4 p)	FC Famars (10)
56.	AS Petite-Forêt (13)	0–9	SA Le Quesnoy (8)
57.	US Verchain-Maugré (12)	3–0 (Note: Tie won by means of forfeit.)	FC Dutemple (8)
58.	Saint-Waast CFC (12)	3–3 (0–3 p)	CO Trith-Saint-Léger (10)

These matches are from the district of Flandres, and were played on 2 and 3 September 2023.

Second Round Results: Hauts-de-France (Flandres)
Tie no	Home team (Tier)	Score	Away team (Tier)
1.	US Lille Moulins Carrel (8)	0–3	US Portugais Roubaix Tourcoing (7)
2.	US Fleurbaix (14)	0–7	AS Hellemmes (7)
3.	FC Steene (11)	1–6	AS Dunkerque Sud (7)
4.	FC Seclin (8)	1–2	Mons AC (7)
5.	USM Merville (9)	1–1 (4–5 p)	US Provin (6)
6.	US Esquelbecq (7)	2–1	FC Dunkerque-Malo Plage (8)
7.	Stella Lys (9)	1–7	US Gravelines (6)
8.	AS Loos Oliveaux (9)	0–4	FC Loon-Plage (6)
9.	SC Bailleulois (8)	0–3	Bondues FC (6)
10.	FC Linselles (8)	0–5	SC Hazebrouck (6)
11.	ES Wormhout (11)	0–8	US Tourcoing FC (6)
12.	RC Bois-Blancs Lille (12)	0–2	UF Lambersart (7)
13.	AG Thumeries (11)	1–3	AS Steenvorde (6)
14.	US Warhem (10)	1–4	US Lesquin (6)
15.	Sailly Forest Foot (11)	0–5	Olympique Grande-Synthe (6)
16.	ES Weppes (10)	0–3	US Saint-André (7)
17.	FC Lille Sud (9)	1–2	FA Neuvilloise (7)
18.	Stade Lezennois (10)	0–8	RC Roubaix (7)
19.	US Marquillies (12)	3–1	Olympique Hémois FC (9)
20.	ASF Looberghe-Holque-Cappelle Brouck de la Colme (11)	1–3	ACS Comines (10)
21.	JA Armentières (9)	2–2 (4–3 p)	US Marquette (8)
22.	FC Grande-Synthe (13)	0–10	ES Mouvalloise (9)
23.	FC Méteren (10)	1–2	US Ronchin (9)
24.	AS Templeuve-en-Pévèle (9)	1–2	OS Fives (8)
25.	OSM Lomme (11)	1–3	FA Blanc Seau (11)
26.	AS Albeck Grande-Synthe (10)	2–3	AS Bersée (10)
27.	US Leffrinckoucke (9)	2–1	US Fretin (10)
28.	US Wattrelos (9)	0–0 (2–4 p)	RC Bergues (8)
29.	UFC Nieppois (11)	2–3	Leers OF (8)
30.	FC Morin (12)	0–3	Toufflers AF (10)
31.	Bac-Sailly Sports (11)	3–4	CS Bousbecque (9)
32.	US Maritime (11)	2–3	JS Lille Wazemmes (9)
33.	US Attiches (12)	0–5	CS La Gorgue (8)
34.	AS Marcq (14)	0–12	US Ascq (8)
35.	ES Capelloise (10)	7–1	CS Gondecourt (11)
36.	ES Genech (9)	1–0	JS Wavrin-Don (8)
37.	SR Lomme Délivrance (10)	4–2	US Yser (10)
38.	FC Bierne (13)	1–5	US Pérenchies (8)
39.	EAC Cysoing-Wannehain-Bourghelles (9)	1–1 (1–3 p)	Union Halluinoise (8)
40.	FC La Chapelle-d'Armentières (10)	3–5	FC Bauvin (10)
41.	FC Le Doulieu (10)	1–5	OSM Sequedin (8)
42.	JS Ghyveldoise (10)	1–1 (5–4 p)	US Monts de Flandre (10)
43.	FC Colmar Armentières (13)	5–7	FC Mons-en-Barœul (11)
44.	US Houplin-Ancoisne (11)	0–3	Verlinghem Foot (9)
45.	RC Herzeele (11)	0–7	ES Roncq (8)
46.	FC Vieux-Berquin (10)	0–4	SC Bourbourg (8)
47.	JS Steenwerck (10)	1–6	EC Anstaing-Chéreng-Tressin-Gruson (8)
48.	ES Ennequin-Loos (10)	1–0 (Note: ES Ennequin-Loos penalised for fielding a suspended player, FC Madeleinois qualify.)	FC Madeleinois (8)

These matches are from the district of Côte d'Opale, and were played on 3 September 2023.

Second Round Results: Hauts-de-France (Côte d'Opale)
Tie no	Home team (Tier)	Score	Away team (Tier)
1.	US Brimeux (12)	0–11	RC Calais (6)
2.	Entente Steenbecque Morbecque (13)	1–8	AS Étaples (6)
3.	US Bourthes (9)	1–2	AS Marck (6)
4.	FC Calais Caténa (10)	0–14	US Saint-Omer (6)
5.	FCP Blendecques (9)	2–4 (Note: Tie reversed from original draw.)	Olympique Hesdin-Marconne (9)
6.	RC Samer (11)	6–0	AS Rang-du-Fliers (11)
7.	ES Guînes (11)	0–8	SC Coquelles (8)
8.	AL Camiers (12)	0–4	US Quiestède (10)
9.	RC Lottinghem (13)	0–17	AS Wimereux (8)
10.	US Blériot-Plage (8)	3–0	US Blaringhem (9)
11.	US Hesdin-l'Abbé (12)	4–1	AS Colembert (12)
12.	US Marais de Gûines (11)	1–1 (6–5 p)	Calais Beau-Marais (7)
13.	ES Arques (8)	1–3	CA Éperlecques (9)
14.	AS Berck (9)	2–2 (5–3 p)	AS Cucq (9)
15.	USM Boulogne-sur-Mer (12)	3–4	FC Capellois (10)
16.	JS Desvroise (8)	2–3	Pays de la Lys (9)
17.	US Vieil-Hesdin (14)	0–11	US Montreuil (8)
18.	Lys Aa FC (10)	2–4	Stade Portelois (7)
19.	ASL Vieil-Moutier La Calique (11)	0–2	ES Saint-Léonard (9)
20.	ES Roquetoire (10)	0–1	ES Calaisis Coulogne (8)
21.	Calais Courgain (14)	1–8	US Landrethun-le-Nord (10)
22.	ES Boisdinghem-Zudausques-Mentque-Nortbécourt (14)	1–3	ES Beaurainville (9)
23.	FJEP Guemps (14)	1–11	AS Audruicq (9)
24.	FC Campagne-lès-Guines (10)	3–1	AF Étaples Haute Ville (9)
25.	AS Campagne-lès-Hesdin (10)	2–3	FC Isques (11)
26.	Le Touquet AC (8)	2–1	JS Longuenesse (8)
27.	RC Bréquerecque Ostrohove (10)	0–4	US Attin (9)
28.	JS Heuringhem (14)	0–0 (5–4 p)	ES Oye-Plage (11)
29.	FLC Longfossé (10)	3–4	USO Rinxent (9)
30.	AS Conchil-le-Temple (9)	0–2	AS Outreau (7)
31.	Gouy-Saint-André RC (10)	0–3	Olympique Lumbrois (7)
32.	RC Ardrésien (10)	1–1 (9–10 p)	FC Nordausques (11)
33.	Olympique Saint-Martin Boulogne (9)	1–1 (4–3 p)	FJEP Fort Vert (9)
34.	US Marquise (9)	4–1	AS Surques-Escœuilles (10)
35.	FC Wavrans-sur-l'Aa (12)	0–0 (3–4 p)	FC Sangatte (11)
36.	AS Nortkerque 95 (9)	0–2	FC Recques-sur-Hem (9)
37.	ES Helfaut (10)	3–0	US Frencq (11)
38.	JS Bonningues-lès-Ardres (13)	2–2 (4–5 p)	US Alquines (11)
39.	FC Conti (12)	4–1	ES Licques (10)
40.	FC Saint-Martin-lez-Tatinghem (9)	4–2	CO Wimille (9)
41.	ES Herbelles-Pihem-Inghem (12)	1–3	Verton FC (9)
42.	FC Wardrecques (10)	1–1 (4–2 p)	ES Saint-Omer Rural (10)
43.	JS Condette (9)	1–0	US Ambleteuse (10)
44.	CS Watten (9)	5–1	Entente Calais (10)
45.	US Elinghen-Ferques (13)	2–2 (6–7 p)	US Nielles-lès-Bléquin (9)

These matches are from the district of Aisne, and were played on 3 September 2023.

Second Round Results: Hauts-de-France (Aisne)
Tie no	Home team (Tier)	Score	Away team (Tier)
1.	US Guignicourt (9)	4–5	BCV FC (9)
2.	FC Vaux-Andigny (12)	3–0	ES Montcornet (9)
3.	Chambry FC (12)	1–11	US Buire-Hirson-Thiérache (8)
4.	US Neuve-Maison (13)	1–2	ESUS Buironfosse-La Capelle (10)
5.	ADP Soissons (13)	0–18	Internationale Soissonnaise (7)
6.	Entente Crouy-Cuffies (10)	1–10	US Laon (6)
7.	AS Marly-Gomont (12)	1–3	FC Fresnoy Fonsomme (9)
8.	FJEP Coincy (11)	2–2 (1–3 p)	AS Milonaise Faverolles (11)
9.	AFC Holnon-Fayet (9)	0–2	US Vervins (10)
10.	Tergnier FC (9)	7–0	Septmonts OC (9)
11.	FFC Chéry-lès-Pouilly (10)	2–4	US Chauny (8)
12.	US Rozoy-sur-Serre (11)	3–0	US Crépy Vivaise (11)
13.	US Chemin des Dames (11)	2–9	Stade Portugais Saint-Quentin (8)
14.	ES Viry-Noureuil (11)	3–0 (Note: ES Viry-Noureuil penalised for fielding an ineligible player, La Concorde de Bucy-les-Pierrepont qualify.)	La Concorde de Bucy-les-Pierrepont (11)
15.	AS Beaurevoir (9)	1–1 (4–5 p)	SAS Moy de l'Aisne (9)
16.	SC Origny-en-Thiérache (9)	3–1	Gauchy-Grugies Saint-Quentin FC (9)
17.	Gouy FC (12)	0–9	US Ribemont Mezieres FC (8)
18.	FC 3 Châteaux (9)	3–2 (Note: Tie reversed from original draw.)	Les Carlésiens FC (13)
19.	L'Arsenal Club Achery-Beautor-Charmes (11)	0–5	Le Nouvion AC (10)
20.	UA Fère-en-Tardenois (10)	0–6	Château Thierry-Etampes FC (8)
21.	CS Aubenton (12)	0–6	US Bruyères-et-Montbérault (9)
22.	ICS Créçois (9)	3–3 (3–2 p)	US Guise (9)
23.	FC Essigny-le-Grand (10)	2–1 (Note: FC Essigny-le-Grand penalised for fielding a suspended player, UES Vermand qualify.)	UES Vermand (9)
24.	CSO Athies (11)	0–0 (3–4 p)	Harly Quentin (8)
25.	Union Sud Aisne FC (11)	1–6	US Prémontré Saint-Gobain (9)
26.	ASPTT Laon (10)	1–2	FC Courmelles (10)
27.	FC Lesdins (12)	3–2	FC Hannapes (10)
28.	US Anizy Pinon (12)	0–1	US Vallée de l'Ailette (11)
29.	ASA Presles (10)	0–3	CS Villeneuve Saint-Germain (9)
30.	Marle Sports (10)	1–0	RC Bohain (8)
31.	US Venizel (11)	0–4	ES Ognes (9)
32.	NES Boué-Étreux (11)	2–14	Écureuils Itancourt-Neuville (6)
33.	US Seboncourt (10)	3–0	AS Tupigny (11)

These matches are from the district of Somme, and were played on 3 September 2023.

Second Round Results: Hauts-de-France (Somme)
Tie no	Home team (Tier)	Score	Away team (Tier)
1.	SC Pont-Remy (10)	4–2	ES Harondel (11)
2.	AS Long (13)	1–11	SC Flixecourt (9)
3.	AS Hautvillers-Ouville (13)	5–2	Association Longpré-Long-Condé (12)
4.	US Le Boisle (12)	0–6	US Nibas Fressenneville (9)
5.	Olympique Belloy-sur-Somme (12)	0–2	US Lignières-Châtelain (10)
6.	AAE Feuquières-en-Vimeu (13)	2–4	Avenir Nouvion-en-Ponthieu (10)
7.	Amiens AF (11)	1–5	SC Abbeville (7)
8.	AS Maisnières (13)	1–1 (3–4 p)	ASIC Bouttencourt (10)
9.	FC Mareuil-Caubert (9)	0–6	AS Gamaches (7)
10.	FC Oisemont (10)	2–1	US Neuilly-l'Hôpital (11)
11.	Mers AC (11)	2–1	Auxiloise (9)
12.	ES Chépy (10)	4–1	US Quend (11)
13.	AS Quesnoy-le-Montant (12)	1–3	Amiens RIF (9)
14.	Olympique Eaucourtois (11)	1–5	JS Miannay-Moyenneville-Lambercourt (8)
15.	AS Saint-Sauveur 80 (10)	1–4	FC Centuloise (9)
16.	US Friville-Escarbotin (8)	3–4	FC Ailly-sur-Somme Samara (8)
17.	US Béthencourt-sur-Mer (10)	0–4	FC Porto Portugais Amiens (6)
18.	US Abbeville (10)	0–3	FC Saint-Valéry Baie de Somme Sud (8)
19.	ABC2F Candas (10)	1–0	ES Deux Vallées (9)
20.	Poix-Blangy-Croixrault FC (9)	0–0 (3–4 p)	AS Airaines-Allery (9)
21.	CS Crécy-en-Ponthieu (11)	2–2 (2–4 p)	SC Templiers Oisemont (9)
22.	FR Englebelmer (10)	1–1 (3–4 p)	US Ouvriere Albert (8)
23.	ES Roye-Damery (11)	3–0	US Ham (11)
24.	AS Querrieu (10)	1–4	FC La Montoye (8)
25.	Amiens FC (12)	0–6	RC Amiens (7)
26.	RC 2 Ercheu (13)	0–10	AAE Chaulnes (9)
27.	ES Sainte-Emilie/Épehy-le-Ronss (11)	0–0 (4–3 p)	SC Moreuil (9)
28.	Entente CAFC Péronne (9)	2–1	AS Glisy (10)
29.	AS Cerisy (11)	1–5	FC Méaulte (10)
30.	ES Sains/Saint-Fuscien (11)	2–6	RC Salouël Saleux (9)
31.	Association Cardonnette Football (12)	1–8	US Marchélepot (10)
32.	ES Pigeonnier Amiens (11)	2–10	US Rosières (9)
33.	FC Grouches-Luchuel (14)	0–16	US Corbie (9)
34.	US Hangest-en-Serre (12)	2–5	RC Doullens (9)
35.	ASL Saveuse (13)	0–6	AC Amiens (6)
36.	AAE Bray-sur-Somme (13)	0–14	AS du Pays Neslois (8)
37.	ES Cagny (10)	5–2	FC Blangy-Tronville (10)
38.	US Camon (7)	4–1	US Roye-Noyon (7)
39.	FC Pont de Metz (13)	0–6	ESC Longueau (6)
40.	US Sailly-Saillisel (10)	2–5	Montdidier AC (8)
41.	ASM Rivery (12)	2–3	Olympique Le Hamel (9)
42.	QCL Sud Amiénois (9)	2–1	AS Villers-Bretonneux (9)

These matches are from the district of Oise, and were played on 3 September 2023.

Second Round Results: Hauts-de-France (Oise)
Tie no	Home team (Tier)	Score	Away team (Tier)
1.	SC Lamotte Breuil (10)	1–1 (3–1 p)	USE Saint-Leu d'Esserent (9)
2.	US Baugy Monchy Humières (11)	0–4	JS Guiscard (10)
3.	FC Saint-Just des Marais (10)	1–1 (2–4 p)	US ASPTT Portugais Beauvais (9)
4.	FC Lavilletertre (12)	1–2	JS Thieux (11)
5.	AS Hénonville (11)	0–2	FC Béthisy (7)
6.	AS La Neuville-sur-Oudeuil (11)	0–2	Standard FC Montataire (7)
7.	Grandvilliers AC (9)	3–1	US Villers-Saint-Paul (9)
8.	CS Avilly-Saint-Léonard (9)	0–4	FCJ Noyon (9)
9.	US Cires-lès-Mello (9)	0–2	SC Saint-Just-en-Chaussée (8)
10.	US Froissy (11)	1–7	US Plessis-Brion (8)
11.	US Lassigny (9)	0–3	CS Chaumont-en-Vexin (6)
12.	AS Saint-Sauveur (Oise) (10)	0–1	US Chevrières-Grandfresnoy (7)
13.	FC Esches Fosseuse (10)	2–0	Hermes-Berthecourt AC (9)
14.	ES Ormoy-Duvy (9)	0–0 (4–5 p)	FC Liancourt-Clermont (7)
15.	FC Boran (11)	2–5	US Gouvieux (7)
16.	US Lamorlaye (9)	1–2	JSA Compiègne-La Croix-Saint Ouen (9)
17.	ÉS Thiers-sur-Thève (12)	1–4	Dynamo Canly Lonueil (9)
18.	CA Venette (10)	1–0	AFC Creil (7)
19.	AS Monchy-Saint-Éloi (12)	3–3 (4–2 p)	AS Cheminots Chambly (13)
20.	FC Bellovaques (11)	0–2	US Saint-Germer-de-Fly (11)
21.	US Marseille-en-Beauvaisis (10)	1–1 (3–4 p)	FC Fontainettes Saint-Aubin (10)
22.	US Thourotte Longueil (8)	1–3	US Choisy-au-Bac (6)
23.	US Breuil-le-Sec (10)	0–2	US Breteuil (7)
24.	AS Campremy/Noyers (12)	1–5	US Balagny-Saint-Epin (8)
25.	US Lieuvillers (10)	1–1 (4–2 p)	ES Remy (11)
26.	US Crèvecœur-le-Grand (10)	3–3 (5–4 p)	US Margny-lès-Compiègne (8)
27.	AS Allonne (9)	1–1 (3–5 p)	USM Senlisienne (6)
28.	AS Verneuil-en-Halatte (9)	2–0	US Bresloise (9)
29.	CSM Mesnil-en-Thelle (12)	1–4	US Ribécourt (9)
30.	FC Talmontiers (13)	1–6	FC Ruraville (11)
31.	AS La Neuville-en-Hez (11)	0–3	US Crépy-en-Valois (8)
32.	AS Verderel-lès-Sauqueuse (11)	0–4	US Meru Sandricourt (8)
33.	US Estrées-Saint-Denis (9)	1–3	US Saint-Maximin (6)
34.	AS Plailly (9)	1–1 (5–3 p)	US Nogent (7)
35.	Entente Compiègne Olympique/GEC Clos des Roses (13)	1–2	USR Saint-Crépin-Ibouvillers (9)
36.	Stade Ressontois (10)	0–3	US Pont Sainte-Maxence (7)
37.	AF Trie-Château (12)	1–1 (4–2 p)	AS Multien (10)
38.	AS Auneuil (9)	5–2	FC Angy (10)
39.	Tricot OS (11)	3–3 (4–2 p)	US Nanteuil FC (12)

=== Third round ===
These matches were played on 16 and 17 September 2023.

Third Round Results: Hauts-de-France
Tie no	Home team (Tier)	Score	Away team (Tier)
1.	FC Conti (12)	0–2	Union Halluinoise (8)
2.	SC Coquelles (8)	2–5	FC Loon-Plage (6)
3.	ACS Comines (10)	1–3	ES Calaisis Coulogne (8)
4.	Verlinghem Foot (9)	1–2	US Blériot-Plage (8)
5.	FC Madeleinois (8)	0–2	Olympique Marcquois Football (5)
6.	FC Sangatte (11)	0–4	Olympique Hesdin-Marconne (9)
7.	US Marais de Gûines (11)	1–3	JS Condette (9)
8.	US Hesdin-l'Abbé (12)	3–0	AS Bersée (10)
9.	CS La Gorgue (8)	1–1 (4–1 p)	ES Beaurainville (9)
10.	USO Meurchin (8)	2–2 (4–3 p)	AFCL Liebaut (8)
11.	RC Bergues (8)	0–0 (5–4 p)	AS Berck (9)
12.	FC Mons-en-Barœul (11)	1–2	Stade Portelois (7)
13.	AS Steenvorde (6)	1–3	SC Hazebrouck (6)
14.	JA Armentières (9)	0–2	RC Roubaix (7)
15.	US Marquillies (12)	2–3	Olympique Grande-Synthe (6)
16.	ES Mouvalloise (9)	1–4	US Leffrinckoucke (9)
17.	JS Ghyveldoise (10)	1–6	ES Roncq (8)
18.	US Gravelines (6)	0–0 (5–4 p)	AS Outreau (7)
19.	FC Capellois (10)	1–7	US Montreuil (8)
20.	US Marquise (9)	1–1 (5–3 p)	FC Campagne-lès-Guines (10)
21.	FC Isques (11)	3–3 (12–11 p)	AS Audruicq (9)
22.	Toufflers AF (10)	2–3	AS Dunkerque Sud (7)
23.	FC Bauvin (10)	3–0	JS Lille Wazemmes (9)
24.	US Landrethun-le-Nord (10)	1–4	SC Bourbourg (8)
25.	RC Samer (11)	0–9	Le Touquet AC (8)
26.	ES Genech (9)	0–1	AS Marck (6)
27.	US Alquines (11)	0–1	ES Saint-Léonard (9)
28.	USO Rinxent (9)	0–0 (4–2 p)	ES Capelloise (10)
29.	OSM Sequedin (8)	3–1	AS Étaples (6)
30.	US Saint-André (7)	0–0 (4–3 p)	AS Wimereux (8)
31.	Verton FC (9)	0–0 (10–11 p)	SR Lomme Délivrance (10)
32.	FA Blanc Seau (11)	0–4	ES Anzin-Saint-Aubin (7)
33.	US Attin (9)	0–2	ES Bully-les-Mines (7)
34.	CS Bousbecque (9)	1–3	Olympique Lumbrois (7)
35.	Olympique Saint-Martin Boulogne (9)	1–3	US Pays de Cassel (5)
36.	US Ronchin (9)	0–3	RC Calais (6)
37.	US Beuvry (11)	0–5	Saint-Amand FC (5)
38.	EC Anstaing-Chéreng-Tressin-Gruson (8)	2–3	Stade Béthunois (6)
39.	La Couture FC (10)	0–0 (1–4 p)	FC Les Epis (8)
40.	CO Trith-Saint-Léger (10)	4–3	US Beaufort/Limont-Fontaine (10)
41.	ES Laventie (10)	1–1 (9–8 p)	CS Watten (9)
42.	AEF Leforest (9)	4–0	US Gommegnies-Carnoy (10)
43.	ESM Hamel (9)	1–6	US Provin (6)
44.	US Nielles-lès-Bléquin (9)	0–5	Iris Club de Croix (5)
45.	FC Wardrecques (10)	1–4	US Pérenchies (8)
46.	SC Douai (8)	2–0	Olympique Flinois (9)
47.	FC La Roupie-Isbergues (11)	0–4	IC La Sentinelle (8)
48.	CA Éperlecques (9)	2–4	FC Montigny-en-Gohelle (8)
49.	Stade Héninois (11)	4–0	FC Saulzoir (11)
50.	FC Lecelles-Rosult (10)	1–5	UF Lambersart (7)
51.	AJ Ruitz (12)	1–1 (4–3 p)	Anzin FARC (10)
52.	OSC Assevent (10)	3–0 (Note: Match abandoned after 75 minutes. AS Loison penalised, OSC Assevent qualify.)	AS Loison (11)
53.	SC Guesnain (9)	1–1 (5–4 p)	ES Labeuvrière (9)
54.	FC Neuville-Saint-Rémy (11)	0–1	CS Avion (6)
55.	JO Wallers-Arenberg (10)	0–1	US Portugais Roubaix Tourcoing (7)
56.	RC Labourse (9)	0–0 (4–1 p)	OS Fives (8)
57.	Carabiniers Billy-Montigny (7)	1–5	US Esquelbecq (7)
58.	AFC Libercourtois (12)	1–4	FC Recques-sur-Hem (9)
59.	FC Nordausques (11)	2–1	USM Marly (8)
60.	CS Diana Liévin (9)	1–2	Mons AC (7)
61.	US Hordain (8)	0–1	FA Neuvilloise (7)
62.	Douchy FC (10)	3–3 (0–3 p)	ES Helfaut (10)
63.	FC Lillers (10)	2–0	AS Hellemmes (7)
64.	Pays de la Lys (9)	0–0 (4–3 p)	Olympique Onnaingeois (9)
65.	Leers OF (8)	1–1 (3–4 p)	AS Sainte-Barbe-Oignies (8)
66.	US Quiestède (10)	0–3	US Auberchicourt (11)
67.	US Mineurs Waziers (7)	0–2	US Saint-Omer (6)
68.	FC Givenchy-en-Gohelle (13)	0–6	US Noyelles-sous-Lens (7)
69.	US Courcelles (8)	2–0	Entente Ligny/Olympique Caullery (9)
70.	Stade Orchésien (8)	1–5	US Nœux-les-Mines (6)
71.	US Izel-lès-Équerchin (12)	1–5	UF Anhiers (11)
72.	Olympique Héninois (10)	3–1 (Note: Match stopped after 87 minutes due to a pitch invasion, after which the captain of EC Mazingarbe refused to restart the game. EC Mazingarbe penalised, Olympique Héninois qualify.)	EC Mazingarbe (10)
73.	FC Férin (9)	0–4	Bondues FC (6)
74.	US Verchain-Maugré (12)	1–3	US Aubygeoise (10)
75.	FC Fontaine-au-Bois (11)	2–0	FC Saint-Martin-lez-Tatinghem (9)
76.	SC Fouquières (11)	1–5	US Ascq (8)
77.	US Beauvois Fontaine (11)	1–5	US Lesquin (6)
78.	JS Heuringhem (14)	1–6	FC Quarouble (8)
79.	FC Hasnon-Millonfosse (12)	0–5	US Tourcoing FC (6)
80.	AS Summer Club Valenciennes (9)	0–0 (3–1 p)	ES Boussois (9)
81.	OSC Loffre (13)	3–1	Olympique Burbure (11)
82.	AS Lensoise (10)	3–4	Espérance Calonne Liévin (9)
83.	Olympique Le Hamel (9)	0–2	US Rouvroy (9)
84.	JS Miannay-Moyenneville-Lambercourt (8)	0–2	US Saint-Pol-sur-Ternoise (8)
85.	AS Hautvillers-Ouville (13)	0–11	AS Plailly (9)
86.	FC Porto Portugais Amiens (6)	4–3	FC Liancourt-Clermont (7)
87.	RC Doullens (9)	9–0	ABC2F Candas (10)
88.	CSAL Souchez (11)	1–5	AS Verneuil-en-Halatte (9)
89.	ES Angres (10)	1–3	AS Maroeuil (11)
90.	ES Cagny (10)	0–3	RC Amiens (7)
91.	SC Templiers Oisemont (9)	1–3	FC Saint-Valéry Baie de Somme Sud (8)
92.	Avenir Nouvion-en-Ponthieu (10)	1–5	JS Écourt-Saint-Quentin (7)
93.	ASIC Bouttencourt (10)	0–7	US Vimy (5)
94.	US Lignières-Châtelain (10)	0–5	ES Lambresienne (6)
95.	US Saint-Maximin (6)	0–3	US Biachoise (6)
96.	Calonne-Ricouart FC Cite 6 (8)	3–0	QCL Sud Amiénois (9)
97.	US Boubers-Conchy (12)	1–4	US Ouvriere Albert (8)
98.	FC Oisemont (10)	0–4	FC Ailly-sur-Somme Samara (8)
99.	AAE Chaulnes (9)	5–2	SC Pro Patria Wingles (8)
100.	AF Trie-Château (12)	1–9	US Nibas Fressenneville (9)
101.	AS Monchy-Saint-Éloi (12)	1–5	Grandvilliers AC (9)
102.	US Corbie (9)	6–1	AS Auneuil (9)
103.	US ASPTT Portugais Beauvais (9)	1–3	SC Abbeville (7)
104.	JS Thieux (11)	1–0	SC Pont-Remy (10)
105.	US Pas-en-Artois (10)	2–2 (3–4 p)	CS Chaumont-en-Vexin (6)
106.	FC Ruraville (11)	2–3	SC Artésien (9)
107.	SC Saint-Just-en-Chaussée (8)	2–2 (8–7 p)	AS Brebières (9)
108.	Tilloy FC (13)	0–5	AC Amiens (6)
109.	Tricot OS (11)	2–1	SC Flixecourt (9)
110.	AAE Aix-Noulette (11)	1–8	Arras FA (6)
111.	Mers AC (11)	0–2	Standard FC Montataire (7)
112.	US Saint-Germer-de-Fly (11)	0–5	US Camon (7)
113.	US Crèvecœur-le-Grand (10)	0–12	ESC Longueau (6)
114.	AS Airaines-Allery (9)	0–6	AS Gamaches (7)
115.	US Breteuil (7)	0–1	US Vermelles (8)
116.	FC La Montoye (8)	5–4	USR Saint-Crépin-Ibouvillers (9)
117.	Amiens RIF (9)	0–1	US Gouvieux (7)
118.	AC Noyelles-Godault (10)	1–5	Montdidier AC (8)
119.	FC Centuloise (9)	1–2	US Meru Sandricourt (8)
120.	FC Beaumont (13)	1–11 (Note: FC Beaumont penalised for fielding a suspended player, AFC Compiègne awarded the match with a 0–11 scoreline.)	AFC Compiègne (5)
121.	FC Fontainettes Saint-Aubin (10)	1–1 (4–3 p)	ES Chépy (10)
122.	FC Esches Fosseuse (10)	1–1 (2–3 p)	US Balagny-Saint-Epin (8)
123.	CS Villeneuve Saint-Germain (9)	1–1 (1–3 p)	US Plessis-Brion (8)
124.	US Vallée de l'Ailette (11)	1–4	FC Provillois (9)
125.	JS Guiscard (10)	1–1 (4–2 p)	JSA Compiègne-La Croix-Saint Ouen (9)
126.	US Bruyères-et-Montbérault (9)	0–2	ES Caudry (7)
127.	RC Salouël Saleux (9)	7–0 (Note: Tie reversed from original draw.)	ES Roye-Damery (11)
128.	AS Milonaise Faverolles (11)	0–5	US Ribécourt (9)
129.	US Crépy-en-Valois (8)	0–4	AC Cambrai (6)
130.	Dynamo Canly Lonueil (9)	1–4	ES Villers-Outréaux (8)
131.	US Fourmies (7)	0–1	US Choisy-au-Bac (6)
132.	US Vervins (10)	2–2 (2–4 p)	UES Vermand (9)
133.	Olympique Maroilles (9)	2–1	US Buire-Hirson-Thiérache (8)
134.	FC Fresnoy Fonsomme (9)	0–2	FCJ Noyon (9)
135.	FC Courmelles (10)	2–3	US Ribemont Mezieres FC (8)
136.	US Marchélepot (10)	1–2	SA Le Quesnoy (8)
137.	Vieux Condé Foot (10)	5–0	SC Lamotte Breuil (10)
138.	US Lieuvillers (10)	1–1 (5–6 p)	US Laon (6)
139.	BCV FC (9)	2–1	Entente CAFC Péronne (9)
140.	FC Méaulte (10)	4–2	ESUS Buironfosse-La Capelle (10)
141.	FC Lesdins (12)	2–3	ES Sainte-Emilie/Épehy-le-Ronss (11)
142.	FC Vaux-Andigny (12)	0–4	US Pont Sainte-Maxence (7)
143.	AS Beuvry-la-Forêt (9)	1–2	US Maubeuge (6)
144.	Harly Quentin (8)	2–3	US Rosières (9)
145.	La Concorde de Bucy-les-Pierrepont (11)	0–0 (3–2 p)	US Bertry-Clary (12)
146.	Tergnier FC (9)	4–0	CA Venette (10)
147.	AS du Pays Neslois (8)	3–2	US Chauny (8)
148.	AFC Colleret (12)	0–9	CAS Escaudœuvres (7)
149.	Stade Portugais Saint-Quentin (8)	3–3 (2–4 p)	US Jeumont (10)
150.	SAS Moy de l'Aisne (9)	0–3	US Seboncourt (10)
151.	US Rozoy-sur-Serre (11)	1–2	US Chevrières-Grandfresnoy (7)
152.	US Prémontré Saint-Gobain (9)	0–3	US Escaudain (6)
153.	Marle Sports (10)	0–3	Écureuils Itancourt-Neuville (6)
154.	US Berlaimont (9)	2–2 (4–3 p)	AS Hautmont (8)
155.	Le Nouvion AC (10)	0–3	FC 3 Châteaux (9)
156.	Internationale Soissonnaise (7)	0–1	US Chantilly (5)
157.	ICS Créçois (9)	3–1	US Bavay (8)
158.	SC Origny-en-Thiérache (9)	8–0	FC Marpent (6)
159.	ES Ognes (9)	0–4	US Le Pays du Valois (5)
160.	Château Thierry-Etampes FC (8)	4–1	FC Avesnes-sur-Helpe (8)
161.	FC Béthisy (7)	0–0 (4–3 p)	USM Senlisienne (6)
162.	AS Douzies (10)	0–6	FC Raismes (7)

=== Fourth round ===
These matches were played on 30 September and 1 October 2023.

Fourth Round Results: Hauts-de-France
Tie no	Home team (Tier)	Score	Away team (Tier)
1.	US Aubygeoise (10)	1–5	FC Montigny-en-Gohelle (8)
2.	SC Saint-Just-en-Chaussée (8)	0–0 (4–3 p)	AC Amiens (6)
3.	AAE Chaulnes (9)	0–3	SC Abbeville (7)
4.	RC Doullens (9)	3–0	FC Fontainettes Saint-Aubin (10)
5.	US Meru Sandricourt (8)	2–3	AS Beauvais Oise (4)
6.	US Ribécourt (9)	1–7	US Vimy (5)
7.	US Ouvriere Albert (8)	1–2	ESC Longueau (6)
8.	Le Touquet AC (8)	0–2	US Chantilly (5)
9.	US Montreuil (8)	0–7	FC Chambly Oise (4)
10.	US Vermelles (8)	4–0	FC La Montoye (8)
11.	JS Écourt-Saint-Quentin (7)	3–3 (5–4 p)	CS Chaumont-en-Vexin (6)
12.	RC Amiens (7)	2–3	Arras FA (6)
13.	FC Saint-Valéry Baie de Somme Sud (8)	1–1 (4–5 p)	US Nœux-les-Mines (6)
14.	AS Verneuil-en-Halatte (9)	2–1	AS Plailly (9)
15.	US Nibas Fressenneville (9)	1–1 (4–2 p)	US Biachoise (6)
16.	Olympique Héninois (10)	0–0 (6–5 p)	Stade Béthunois (6)
17.	UF Anhiers (11)	0–7	Montdidier AC (8)
18.	SC Artésien (9)	2–3	ES Anzin-Saint-Aubin (7)
19.	US Rosières (9)	0–3	FC Porto Portugais Amiens (6)
20.	US Saint-Pol-sur-Ternoise (8)	1–1 (3–4 p)	US Noyelles-sous-Lens (7)
21.	US Corbie (9)	3–0	FC Méaulte (10)
22.	AS Gamaches (7)	1–1 (3–4 p)	US Balagny-Saint-Epin (8)
23.	Stade Héninois (11)	1–1 (4–5 p)	CS Avion (6)
24.	Tricot OS (11)	2–2 (4–3 p)	JS Thieux (11)
25.	AS Maroeuil (11)	1–3	US Gouvieux (7)
26.	FC Ailly-sur-Somme Samara (8)	0–0 (3–5 p)	Standard FC Montataire (7)
27.	FCJ Noyon (9)	1–1 (5–4 p)	RC Salouël Saleux (9)
28.	Grandvilliers AC (9)	1–2	US Camon (7)
29.	ES Caudry (7)	1–1 (7–8 p)	FC Raismes (7)
30.	Vieux Condé Foot (10)	1–1 (1–3 p)	US Saint-André (7)
31.	US Chevrières-Grandfresnoy (7)	2–2 (4–5 p)	SA Le Quesnoy (8)
32.	US Berlaimont (9)	1–2	Château Thierry-Etampes FC (8)
33.	AFC Compiègne (5)	1–1 (3–4 p)	Saint-Amand FC (5)
34.	AS Sainte-Barbe-Oignies (8)	3–1	FC 3 Châteaux (9)
35.	ES Lambresienne (6)	2–3	US Escaudain (6)
36.	US Seboncourt (10)	1–0	UES Vermand (9)
37.	Écureuils Itancourt-Neuville (6)	4–2	FC Béthisy (7)
38.	CO Trith-Saint-Léger (10)	0–0 (4–1 p)	CAS Escaudœuvres (7)
39.	JS Guiscard (10)	1–5	FC Quarouble (8)
40.	FC Les Epis (8)	1–4	US Maubeuge (6)
41.	AS Summer Club Valenciennes (9)	0–6	Entente Feignies Aulnoye FC (4)
42.	FC Provillois (9)	1–3	Mons AC (7)
43.	US Jeumont (10)	0–1	US Plessis-Brion (8)
44.	SC Origny-en-Thiérache (9)	1–1 (1–3 p)	Tergnier FC (9)
45.	IC La Sentinelle (8)	1–1 (5–3 p)	AS du Pays Neslois (8)
46.	OSC Assevent (10)	0–3	ES Villers-Outréaux (8)
47.	US Auberchicourt (11)	0–2	AC Cambrai (6)
48.	US Provin (6)	1–0	US Lesquin (6)
49.	SC Guesnain (9)	0–6	US Le Pays du Valois (5)
50.	ICS Créçois (9)	0–1	Olympique Saint-Quentin (4)
51.	OSC Loffre (13)	2–1	FC Fontaine-au-Bois (11)
52.	US Courcelles (8)	1–0	SC Douai (8)
53.	US Pont Sainte-Maxence (7)	2–2 (5–6 p)	US Laon (6)
54.	La Concorde de Bucy-les-Pierrepont (11)	0–5	US Choisy-au-Bac (6)
55.	US Ribemont Mezieres FC (8)	4–0	BCV FC (9)
56.	ES Sainte-Emilie/Épehy-le-Ronss (11)	0–2	Olympique Maroilles (9)
57.	ES Helfaut (10)	1–6	FC Loon-Plage (6)
58.	UF Lambersart (7)	2–1	CS La Gorgue (8)
59.	US Pays de Cassel (5)	1–2	Iris Club de Croix (5)
60.	FC Isques (11)	0–4	Calonne-Ricouart FC Cite 6 (8)
61.	US Blériot-Plage (8)	2–1	USO Rinxent (9)
62.	Olympique Hesdin-Marconne (9)	0–0 (2–4 p)	Stade Portelois (7)
63.	SC Bourbourg (8)	0–2	AS Marck (6)
64.	US Pérenchies (8)	0–0 (5–4 p)	RC Labourse (9)
65.	SR Lomme Délivrance (10)	5–1	FC Nordausques (11)
66.	FC Bauvin (10)	0–4	US Saint-Omer (6)
67.	ES Calaisis Coulogne (8)	3–0	US Portugais Roubaix Tourcoing (7)
68.	US Leffrinckoucke (9)	3–2	OSM Sequedin (8)
69.	US Ascq (8)	2–0	US Rouvroy (9)
70.	RC Bergues (8)	1–2	Bondues FC (6)
71.	JS Condette (9)	0–6	Olympique Marcquois Football (5)
72.	FC Lillers (10)	2–0	AS Dunkerque Sud (7)
73.	Espérance Calonne Liévin (9)	2–0	ES Saint-Léonard (9)
74.	AJ Ruitz (12)	1–3	Pays de la Lys (9)
75.	FC Recques-sur-Hem (9)	0–1	US Tourcoing FC (6)
76.	ES Bully-les-Mines (7)	2–0	FA Neuvilloise (7)
77.	Olympique Grande-Synthe (6)	1–0	SC Hazebrouck (6)
78.	US Esquelbecq (7)	2–3	USO Meurchin (8)
79.	US Gravelines (6)	1–4	Wasquehal Football (4)
80.	US Marquise (9)	2–2 (3–4 p)	Olympique Lumbrois (7)
81.	US Hesdin-l'Abbé (12)	1–12	US Boulogne (4)
82.	AEF Leforest (9)	2–5	RC Roubaix (7)
83.	ES Roncq (8)	0–6	RC Calais (6)
84.	ES Laventie (10)	0–1	Union Halluinoise (8)

=== Fifth round ===
These matches were played on 14 and 15 October 2023.

Fifth Round Results: Hauts-de-France
Tie no	Home team (Tier)	Score	Away team (Tier)
1.	FC Porto Portugais Amiens (6)	1–2	US Le Pays du Valois (5)
2.	ES Villers-Outréaux (8)	2–1	FCJ Noyon (9)
3.	Tergnier FC (9)	1–9	Écureuils Itancourt-Neuville (6)
4.	FC Montigny-en-Gohelle (8)	2–4	Arras FA (6)
5.	US Ribemont Mezieres FC (8)	0–3	US Laon (6)
6.	US Plessis-Brion (8)	1–5	CS Avion (6)
7.	AS Sainte-Barbe-Oignies (8)	1–2	US Nœux-les-Mines (6)
8.	Château Thierry-Etampes FC (8)	0–0 (4–5 p)	Montdidier AC (8)
9.	Tricot OS (11)	0–6	US Gouvieux (7)
10.	US Seboncourt (10)	0–2	RC Doullens (9)
11.	US Camon (7)	1–0	Olympique Saint-Quentin (4)
12.	US Maubeuge (6)	4–0	SC Abbeville (7)
13.	US Corbie (9)	2–2 (3–0 p)	ES Bully-les-Mines (7)
14.	US Vimy (5)	1–3	ESC Longueau (6)
15.	US Nibas Fressenneville (9)	0–5	Entente Feignies Aulnoye FC (4)
16.	US Choisy-au-Bac (6)	2–0	AS Beauvais Oise (4)
17.	JS Écourt-Saint-Quentin (7)	2–2 (3–5 p)	US Chantilly (5)
18.	ES Anzin-Saint-Aubin (7)	3–0	SC Saint-Just-en-Chaussée (8)
19.	AC Cambrai (6)	4–1	US Noyelles-sous-Lens (7)
20.	SA Le Quesnoy (8)	4–1	US Balagny-Saint-Epin (8)
21.	AS Verneuil-en-Halatte (9)	3–1	Standard FC Montataire (7)
22.	Union Halluinoise (8)	1–2	Bondues FC (6)
23.	FC Lillers (10)	2–3	SR Lomme Délivrance (10)
24.	Espérance Calonne Liévin (9)	4–2	Olympique Lumbrois (7)
25.	Calonne-Ricouart FC Cite 6 (8)	1–0	UF Lambersart (7)
26.	RC Roubaix (7)	1–1 (6–7 p)	US Blériot-Plage (8)
27.	IC La Sentinelle (8)	1–0	US Vermelles (8)
28.	FC Quarouble (8)	0–4	Saint-Amand FC (5)
29.	Olympique Maroilles (9)	0–2	Stade Portelois (7)
30.	US Tourcoing FC (6)	0–1	US Provin (6)
31.	US Leffrinckoucke (9)	0–0 (5–3 p)	Olympique Marcquois Football (5)
32.	CO Trith-Saint-Léger (10)	1–1 (3–5 p)	ES Calaisis Coulogne (8)
33.	USO Meurchin (8)	0–3	Wasquehal Football (4)
34.	Olympique Héninois (10)	1–1 (3–1 p)	US Escaudain (6)
35.	Pays de la Lys (9)	0–0 (4–5 p)	FC Raismes (7)
36.	US Saint-Omer (6)	1–1 (3–0 p)	AS Marck (6)
37.	US Ascq (8)	1–6	Iris Club de Croix (5)
38.	US Saint-André (7)	1–2	US Boulogne (4)
39.	OSC Loffre (13)	0–10	FC Chambly Oise (4)
40.	US Courcelles (8)	0–4	Olympique Grande-Synthe (6)
41.	US Pérenchies (8)	0–4	RC Calais (6)
42.	FC Loon-Plage (6)	2–1	Mons AC (7)

=== Sixth round ===
These matches were played on 28 and 29 October 2023.

Sixth Round Results: Hauts-de-France
Tie no	Home team (Tier)	Score	Away team (Tier)
1.	SA Le Quesnoy (8)	1–1 (2–1 p)	Espérance Calonne Liévin (9)
2.	ES Villers-Outréaux (8)	1–3	FC Chambly Oise (4)
3.	IC La Sentinelle (8)	0–4	ESC Longueau (6)
4.	Arras FA (6)	1–1 (3–4 p)	RC Calais (6)
5.	US Corbie (9)	0–3 (Note: Match abandoned after 78 minutes, due objects being thrown from the stand. US Corbie penalised, US Camon qualify.)	US Camon (7)
6.	Olympique Héninois (10)	0–2	US Nœux-les-Mines (6)
7.	RC Doullens (9)	4–0	AS Verneuil-en-Halatte (9)
8.	US Chantilly (5)	1–1 (4–2 p)	AC Cambrai (6)
9.	Calonne-Ricouart FC Cite 6 (8)	3–3 (0–3 p)	US Saint-Omer (6)
10.	Bondues FC (6)	1–1 (4–3 p)	US Maubeuge (6)
11.	Montdidier AC (8)	0–0 (7–6 p)	Saint-Amand FC (5)
12.	US Leffrinckoucke (9)	0–6	Iris Club de Croix (5)
13.	Écureuils Itancourt-Neuville (6)	5–0	Wasquehal Football (4)
14.	FC Raismes (7)	0–1	FC Loon-Plage (6)
15.	US Blériot-Plage (8)	2–2 (5–4 p)	CS Avion (6)
16.	ES Anzin-Saint-Aubin (7)	0–7	Entente Feignies Aulnoye FC (4)
17.	Olympique Grande-Synthe (6)	1–2	US Boulogne (4)
18.	ES Calaisis Coulogne (8)	0–2	US Choisy-au-Bac (6)
19.	SR Lomme Délivrance (10)	0–5	US Le Pays du Valois (5)
20.	US Provin (6)	1–1 (4–1 p)	Stade Portelois (7)
21.	US Gouvieux (7)	1–5	US Laon (6)
