= Axel Prohouly =

French footballer (born 1997)

Personal information
- Date of birth: 30 June 1997 (age 29)
- Place of birth: Grasse, France
- Height: 1.74 m (5 ft 9 in)
- Position: Midfielder

Team information
- Current team: US Terre Sainte

Youth career
- 2003–2010: Mougins
- 2010–2015: Monaco

Senior career*
Years	Team	Apps	(Gls)
2015–2018	Queens Park Rangers	0	(0)
2017	→ Port Vale (loan)	0	(0)
2019	Racing Club de France	3	(0)
2019–2020	Lorient B	5	(1)
2020–2021	Loon-Plage		
2021–2022	Grande-Synthe		
2022	Radomlje	11	(0)
2022–2023	Saint-Omer		
2023–2024	Calais		
2024–2025	Zürich City SC		
2025–	US Terre Sainte		

International career
2012–2013	France U16	8	(1)
2016	France U19	4	(0)
- * Club domestic league appearances and goals

Axel Prohouly (born 30 June 1997) is a French footballer who plays as a midfielder for Swiss club US Terre Sainte.

Seen as a top prospect as a teenager, he was courted by Barcelona and Chelsea. However, he ended up signing with Queens Park Rangers from Monaco in June 2015. He had a brief loan spell with Port Vale in January 2017 but left QPR twelve months later without having played a first-team game. He returned to France and had short spells with amateur clubs Racing Club de France, Lorient B, Loon-Plage and Grande-Synthe. He signed with Slovenian club Radomlje, making his professional debut in February 2022 at 24. He returned to France later in the year to play for Saint-Omer. He won the Régional 1 with Calais in the 2023–24 season.

== Club career ==
=== Queens Park Rangers ===
At the age of 13, Prohouly received offers from the youth academies of Spanish La Liga side Barcelona and Chelsea in the English Premier League. He spent five years as an amateur player with AS Monaco, before signing a three-year contract with English Championship club Queens Park Rangers in June 2015. He scored five goals in 18 appearances for QPR's under-21 team in the 2015–16 season. On 31 January 2017, Prohouly signed with EFL League One side Port Vale on loan until the end of the 2016–17 season. However, he failed to make an appearance at either QPR or Port Vale and ended his loan spell at Vale Park early to return to Loftus Road. He agreed to have his contract at Queens Park Rangers terminated in January 2018.

=== French amateur leagues ===
Prohouly turned down a contract offer from Red Star in the hope of a more financially lucrative offer that never came. Before the second half of the 2018–19 season, he signed for Racing Club de France in the Championnat National 3. He played his first game in senior football on 16 February 2019, in a 0–0 draw with Les Mureaux at Stade Yves-du-Manoir, and made two further appearances for the club. In 2019, he signed for Championnat National 2 team Lorient B. He scored his first career goal on 17 August 2019, during a 1–1 draw at Fleury 91. He rejected the chance to play in Bulgaria as he wanted his wife to be able to commute to London. In 2021, he signed for Grande-Synthe in Régional 1. He helped the sixth-tier club to reach the Round of 64 in the Coupe de France, where they were beaten by Boulogne.

=== Radomlje ===
Before the second half of the 2021–22 season, Prohouly signed for Slovenian PrvaLiga side Radomlje. On 14 February 2022, he made his professional debut for Radomlje during a 4–0 win at Aluminij. He retained his place seven days later for the 4–1 defeat by Maribor at Domžale Sports Park.

=== Calais ===
On 29 June 2023, Prohouly signed for Régional 1 club Calais. On 18 November, in the seventh round of the 2023–24 Coupe de France, Calais secured a 2–1 victory over ESC Longueau thanks to stoppage time goals from Prohouly and Claudio Beauvue, setting up a match against Ligue 2 side Caen in the following round. Calais achieved promotion to the Championnat National 3 at the end of the 2023–24 season.

=== Swiss amateur leagues ===
On 29 July 2024, Prohouly signed for Swiss club Zürich City SC. Ahead of the 2025–26 season, he signed for US Terre Sainte.

== International career ==
Prohouly was capped at under-16 and under-19 level, winning the 2012 Tournoi du Val-de-Marne with the under-16s.

== Style of play ==
Prohouly is primarily a central midfielder, but can play anywhere across the midfield. He has good speed, dribbling and heading skills.

== Personal life ==
Prohouly married Jennifer, an Austrian model, in 2017.

== Career statistics ==
As of match played 9 December 2023

Appearances and goals by club, season and competition
Club	Season	League			National cup (Note: Includes FA Cup, Coupe de France, Slovenian Cup)		League cup (Note: Includes EFL Cup, Coupe de la Ligue)		Total	
Club	Season	Division	Apps	Goals	Apps	Goals	Apps	Goals	Apps	Goals
Queens Park Rangers	2015–16	Championship	0	0	0	0	0	0	0	0
Queens Park Rangers	2016–17	EFL Championship	0	0	0	0	0	0	0	0
Queens Park Rangers	2017–18	EFL Championship	0	0	0	0	0	0	0	0
Queens Park Rangers	Total		0	0	0	0	0	0	0	0
Port Vale (loan)	2016–17	EFL League One	0	0	0	0	0	0	0	0
Racing Club de France	2018–19	Championnat National 3	3	0	0	0	—		3	0
Lorient B	2019–20	Championnat National 2	5	1	0	0	—		5	1
Lorient B	2020–21	Championnat National 2	0	0	0	0	—		0	0
Lorient B	Total		5	1	0	0	—		5	1
Loon-Plage	2020–21	Régional 1			3 (Note: Statistics are only from the seventh round of the Coupe de France onwards.)	0	—		3	0
Radomlje	2021–22	Slovenian PrvaLiga	11	0	0	0	—		11	0
Saint-Omer	2022–23	Régional 1			0	0	—		0	0
Calais	2023–24	Régional 1			2	1	—		2	1
Career total			19	1	5	1	0	0	24	2

== Honours ==
Calais

- Régional 1: 2023–24
