= 2023–24 Coupe de France preliminary rounds =

2023–24 Coupe de France
Coupe Charles Simon

Tournament details
- Country: France

The 2023–24 Coupe de France preliminary rounds make up the qualifying competition to decide which teams take part in the main competition from the seventh round. This is the 107th season of the main football cup competition of France. The competition is organised by the French Football Federation (FFF) and is open to all clubs in French football, as well as clubs from the overseas departments and territories (Guadeloupe, French Guiana, Martinique, Mayotte, New Caledonia, Tahiti, Réunion, Saint Martin, and Saint Pierre and Miquelon). Due to Ligue 1 was reduced to 18 teams, meaning that 46 winners will advance to the round of 64 from round 8, a total of 164 teams qualified for round 7 from this process this season, rather than the usual 156.

The six (or more, if required) preliminary rounds are organised by the 13 Regional leagues from the mainland, and the 6 Regional leagues of the overseas departments and territories. They take place between May and November 2023.

== Schedule ==
Although all mainland regions follow a set schedule from the third round, regions are allowed to set their own schedules for earlier rounds, including any preliminaries required. The general schedule published by the FFF saw all rounds return to their usual dates, after changes last season due to the 2022 FIFA World Cup. The Paris-Île-de-France league chose to hold their early rounds at the end of the 2022–23 season, rather the normal August dates.

Overseas territories organise their own qualifying tournaments, aligning with entry into the main tournament at the seventh round.

Round	Date
Third round	17 September 2023
Fourth round	30 September 2023
Fifth round	15 October 2023
Sixth round	29 October 2023

== Leagues ==
The details of the qualifying rounds for each league is separated out to individual articles, to avoid this article being too lengthy.

=== Overseas leagues ===
A total of eleven clubs will qualify from the overseas leagues, two each from Guadeloupe, French Guiana, Martinique, Réunion, and one each from Mayotte, New Caledonia and Tahiti.

In 2022–23, La Tamponnaise from Réunion made it to the round of 64, losing to RC Grasse 1–0 on the mainland.

==== Mayotte ====
On 9 May 2023, the Mayotte league announced that 85 teams had entered the competition, of which 39 teams from the lowest division, Régionale 4, had been included in the draw for the tour de cadrage (framing round), with one team given a bye. The second and third round draws were published on 30 May 2023, with the teams from the second and third tier divisions joining at the second round stage and the teams from the first tier joining at the third round stage. In the second round, 25 ties were drawn, and four teams were given byes. In the third round, 9 ties were drawn with the remaining 23 teams given byes. In early July the third round was redrawn. The round of 32 was published on 25 July 2023, with all teams remaining now participating in a straight knock-out competition. The draw for the remaining rounds was published on 23 August 2023.

This match was played on 14 October 2023.

Final results: Mayotte
Tie no	Home team (Tier)	Score	Away team (Tier)
1.	(Mayotte) ACSJ M'Liha (R3)	0–3	AS Rosador (R1) (Mayotte)

Note: Mayotte League Structure (no promotion to French League Structure):
Régionale 1 (R1)
Régionale 2 (R2)
Régionale 3 (R3)
Régionale 4 (R4)

==== Réunion ====
For this season, the Réunion league designated that entrants would be the teams from Régionale 1 and two teams chosen from Super 2, totalling 16 teams. The first draw for teams in the Réunion league, titled as the second round in line with the mainland competition, was published on 11 May 2023. The league titled the next round as the fifth round, publishing the draw on 30 June 2023. The league confirmed the programme for the sixth round on 24 October 2023.

These matches were played on 29 October 2023.

Sixth round results: Réunion
Tie no	Home team (Tier)	Score	Away team (Tier)
1.	(Réunion) JS Saint-Pierroise (R1)	1–1 (5–6 p)	Saint-Denis FC (R1) (Réunion)
2.	(Réunion) AS Excelsior (R1)	1–1 (4–5 p)	La Tamponnaise (R1) (Réunion)

Note: Reúnion League Structure (no promotion to French League Structure):
Régional 1 (R1)
Super 2 (S2)

==== French Guiana ====
On 9 July 2023, the league published the list of the 38 teams registered for the qualifying competition. The draw for the first two rounds, starting with the second round to align with the naming convention of the main competition, was originally carried out on 7 July 2023, but due to an error it was redrawn on 12 July 2023. The draw for the remaining rounds of the competition was published on 28 August 2023.

These matches were played on 28 and 29 October 2023.

Sixth Round Results: French Guiana
Tie no	Home team (Tier)	Score	Away team (Tier)
1.	(French Guiana) ASE Matoury (R1)	1–1 (1–3 p)	ASC Le Geldar (R1) (French Guiana)
2.	(French Guiana) ASC Agouado (R2)	1–0	US Sinnamary (R2) (French Guiana)

Note: French Guiana League Structure (no promotion to French League Structure):
Régional 1 (R1)
Régional 2 (R2)
Régional 3 (R3)

==== Martinique ====
On 16 August 2023, the league published the draw for the opening round of the competition, name the 2ème tour, or second round, to align with the rest of the main competition. The 26 ties drawn in this round, and the 6 byes required to form 16 ties in the next round, made for a total of 58 teams taking part in the qualifying competition. The third round draw was published by local media the day after the second round matches took place. The fourth round draw was published by local media on 5 September 2023. The fifth round draw was made on 26 September 2023.

These matches were played on 28 October 2023.

Sixth Round Results: Martinique
Tie no	Home team (Tier)	Score	Away team (Tier)
1.	(Martinique) Stade Spiritain (R1)	0–5	AS Samaritaine (R1) (Martinique)
2.	(Martinique) Golden Lion FC (R1)	4–1	Club Péléen (R1) (Martinique)

Note: Martinique League Structure (no promotion to French League Structure):
Régionale 1 (R1)
Régionale 2 (R2)
Régionale 3 (R3)

==== Guadeloupe ====
The draw for the opening round of the competition, named as the second round to align with the main competition, was made on 20 July 2023, and published a day later on the official Facebook page of the league. A total of 20 ties were drawn, meaning 12 teams were handed byes in order for the third round to have the required number of teams, and a total of 52 teams had entered the competition from the region. The third round draw was only published on the Facebook page of the league on 1 September 2023, the day before the round began. The fourth round draw was published on 22 September 2023 on the leagues website, the day before the round began. The fifth round draw was also only published on the Facebook page of the league on 17 October 2023, the day the first of the games was played.

These matches were played on 27 and 28 October 2023.

Sixth Round Results: Guadeloupe
Tie no	Home team (Tier)	Score	Away team (Tier)
1.	(Guadeloupe) AS Le Moule (R2)	0–4	SC Baie-Mahault (R1) (Guadeloupe)
2.	(Guadeloupe) CS Moulien (R1)	5–0	La Gauloise de Basse-Terre (R1) (Guadeloupe)

Note: Guadeloupe League Structure (no promotion to French League Structure):
Ligue Régionale 1 (R1)
Ligue Régionale 2 (R2)
Ligue Régionale 3 (R3)

==== Saint Pierre and Miquelon ====
The Overseas Collectivity of Saint Pierre and Miquelon has only three teams, so there is just one match in each of two rounds, with one team receiving a bye to the second round. Lots were drawn to decide which teams would receive the bye.

=== Nouvelle-Aquitaine ===
A total of fourteen teams will qualify from the Nouvelle-Aquitaine preliminary rounds.

In 2022–23, four teams from the region progressed to the 8th round, but all were eliminated at that stage. Fourth tier Bergerac Périgord FC and Trélissac-Antonne Périgord FC were defeated by Ligue 2 sides Niort and Bordeaux respectively; fifth tier US Lège Cap Ferret lost to third tier LB Châteauroux and fifth tier SO Châtellerault lost to Avoine OCC from the same division.

On 27 July 2023, the league announced that 700 teams from the region had entered the competition. 558 teams took part in the first round, being all the teams registered from the Departmental level divisions, and all but 35 Régional 3 teams. The exempted teams were chosen based on their performance in the previous seasons competition. The second round draw saw all 125 remaining teams from the regional divisions enter the competition. The third round draw was published on 7 September 2023, with the 10 teams from Championnat National 3 entering at this stage. The fourth round draw, including the four teams from Championnat National 2, was carried out live on the Facebook page of the league on 25 September 2023.

The fifth round draw, which included 1 team from Championnat National, took place on 9 October 2023. The sixth and final regional round was drawn on 19 October 2023.

These matches were played on 28 and 29 October 2023, with one replayed on 1 November 2023, one postponed to 5 November 2023, and one played on 8 November 2023 after issues outstanding from previous rounds were resolved.

Sixth Round Results: Nouvelle Aquitaine
Tie no	Home team (Tier)	Score	Away team (Tier)
1.	CS Feytiat (6)	1–2	Bergerac Périgord FC (4)
2.	FC Périgny (7)	2–3	Stade Poitevin FC (5)
3.	FC Grand Saint-Emilionnais (7)	0–5	FC Chauray (5)
4.	JA Biarritz (7)	1–2	Trélissac-Antonne Périgord FC (4)
5.	Rochefort FC (6)	0–1 (Note: The original match was abandoned with 25 minutes to play, as the pitch had become unplayable due to bad weather. Rochefort led 1–0 at the time. The match was replayed on 1 November 2023.)	Étoile Maritime FC (6)
6.	FC Libourne (4)	3–0	SO Châtellerault (5)
7.	Aviron Bayonnais (5)	3–2	Chamois Niortais FC (3)
8.	FA Morlaàs Est Béarn (7)	0–0 (5–3 p)	CA Neuville (6)
9.	Mas AC (7)	0–5	AS Panazol (5)
10.	Aunis AFC (8)	0–0 (4–2 p) (Note: The match was not played on the original date, due to a technical problem at the stadium. The match was replayed on 5 November 2023.)	Saint-Paul Sport (5)
11.	CMO Bassens (8)	0–5	Angoulême Charente FC (4)
12.	Jeunesse Villenave (6)	1–0	RC Parthenay Viennay (7)
13.	ES Château-Larcher (8)	2–4	JA Isle (7)
14.	FC Rive Droite 33 (8)	1–2	FC Bassin d'Arcachon (6)

=== Pays de la Loire ===
A total of eleven teams will qualify from the Pays de la Loire preliminary rounds.

In 2022–23, Les Herbiers VF progressed furthest in the main competition, reaching the round of 32, where they lost to Stade de Reims.

On 29 June 2023, the league confirmed that 510 teams from the region had entered the competition. On 25 July 2023, confirmed that 418 teams would enter at the first round stage, from the departmental and regional division, with 16 teams from Régional 3 being exempted to the second round. The second round draw was made on 28 August 2023 by the league, with the remaining Régional 3 sides and the sides from Régional 2 entering at this stage. The third round draw was published on 6 September 2023, with the 18 teams from Régional 1 and 10 from Championnat National 3 joining the competition at this stage.

The fourth round draw, featuring the four teams from Championnat National 2, was carried out on 26 September 2023. The fifth round draw, featuring two teams from Championnat National, was carried out on 3 October 2023. The sixth and final regional round was drawn on 18 October 2023.

These matches were played on 28 and 29 October 2023.

Sixth Round Results: Pays de la Loire
Tie no	Home team (Tier)	Score	Away team (Tier)
1.	FC Château-Gontier (8)	0–2	JS Coulaines (6)
2.	ES Aubance (7)	2–2 (4–2 p)	Voltigeurs de Châteaubriant (4)
3.	JSC Bellevue Nantes (6)	0–2	FC Challans (5)
4.	CS Changé (8)	1–1 (4–5 p)	Saint-Aubin-Guérande Football (8)
5.	Ancienne Château-Gontier (5)	0–5	Olympique Saumur FC (4)
6.	SO Cholet (3)	2–1	Le Mans FC (3)
7.	Olympique Chemillé-Melay (7)	2–2 (2–4 p)	Stade Mayennais FC (6)
8.	Mareuil SC (6)	0–3	Les Herbiers VF (4)
9.	US Méral-Cossé (8)	0–4	US Philbertine Football (5)
10.	Orvault SF (6)	1–1 (4–5 p)	La France d'Aizenay (7)
11.	Vendée Poiré-sur-Vie Football (5)	0–0 (4–2 p)	Vendée Fontenay Foot (5)

=== Centre-Val de Loire ===
A total of six teams will qualify from the Centre-Val de Loire preliminary rounds.

In 2022–23, Vierzon FC were the last amateur team in the main competition, reaching the round of 16, where they were narrowly beaten by Grenoble.

On 20 July 2023, the league published that 238 teams from the region had entered the competition, and that 170 teams would enter at the first round stage, being the teams from the departmental divisions and four team from Régional 3. The remaining teams from Régional 3, plus the teams from the other regional divisions (totalling 51) would enter at the second round stage. On the same day, the first and second round draws were published. The second round draw was published on 28 August 2023.

The third round draw, featuring the 8 teams from Championnat National 3, was published on 6 September 2023. The fourth round draw, including the five teams from Championnat National 2, was carried out live on the Facebook page of the league on 20 September 2023. The fourth round draw, featuring the two teams from Championnat National, was carried out on 4 October 2023. The sixth and final regional round was drawn on 18 October 2023.

These matches were played on 28 and 29 October 2023.

Sixth Round Results: Centre-Val de Loire
Tie no	Home team (Tier)	Score	Away team (Tier)
1.	US Petite Beauce (9)	0–2	FC Montlouis (5)
2.	SC Malesherbes (7)	1–2	Avoine OCC (4)
3.	SO Romorantin (4)	2–1	Tours FC (5)
4.	ÉB Saint-Cyr-sur-Loire (7)	0–1	Vierzon FC (5)
5.	Saint-Pryvé Saint-Hilaire FC (4)	1–1 (3–4 p)	US Orléans (3)
6.	SC Châteauneuf-sur-Cher (9)	0–3	LB Châteauroux (3)

=== Corsica ===
Two teams will qualify from the Corsica preliminary rounds.

In 2022–23, both qualifying teams, FC Borgo and GC Lucciana were eliminated at the seventh-round stage. FC Borgo lost 3–0 at Nîmes. GC Lucciana lost by a single goal to JA Drancy from the same division.

On 16 August 2023, the league announced that a total of 35 teams from the region had entered the competition. At the same time, the structure of the qualifying competition was announced. A preliminary round, analogous to the second round in other regions, featured six teams, drawn from the 28 teams entered from the regional divisions. The winners, and those not drawn, progressed to the third round, where they were joined by the clubs from Championnat National 3. The third round draw was published on 7 September 2023. The fourth round draw, which saw the two Championnat National 2 teams enter the competition, was published on 21 September 2023. The fifth round draw was published on 5 October 2023. The sixth and final regional round was drawn on 19 October 2023.

These matches were played on 28 and 29 October 2023.

Sixth Round Results: Corsica
Tie no	Home team (Tier)	Score	Away team (Tier)
1.	Squadra Valincu Alta-Rocca Rizzanese (6)	2–1	FC Balagne (5)
2.	AS Furiani-Agliani (4)	2–1	FC Borgo (4)

=== Bourgogne-Franche-Comté ===
A total of nine teams will qualify from the Bourgogne-Franche-Comté preliminary rounds.

In 2022–23, ASM Belfort progressed the furthest in the competition, reaching the round of 32, where they were beaten by Annecy FC on penalties, in a game which ended with fighting between the players of both sides.

On 13 June 2023, the league announced that 404 teams had entered from the region. The draw for the first round was published on the same day, featuring 298 teams from the district level divisions, and from Régional 3. The remaining 24 Régional 3 teams were given a bye to the second round. The draw for the second round was published on 22 August 2023, featuring the remaining 89 Régional level teams.

The third round draw, featuring the 11 teams from Championnat National 3, was published on 29 August 2023. The fourth round draw, featuring the 3 teams from Championnat National 2, was carried out on 19 September 2023. The fifth round draw, featuring the 2 teams from Championnat National, was published on 3 October 2023. The sixth and final regional round was drawn on 18 October 2023.

These matches were played on 28 and 29 October 2023.

Sixth Round Results: Bourgogne-Franche-Comté
Tie no	Home team (Tier)	Score	Away team (Tier)
1.	FC Rochefort Athletic (8)	0–6	UF Mâconnais (4)
2.	CA Pontarlier (5)	3–2	FC Morteau-Montlebon (6)
3.	FC Sens (6)	1–2	Dijon FCO (3)
4.	FC Sochaux Montbéliard (3)	1–0 (Note: Tie reversed from original draw.)	FC Grandvillars (6)
5.	Is-Selongey Football (5)	0–1	Jura Sud Foot (4)
6.	FC Vesoul (5)	0–1	Louhans-Cuiseaux FC (5)
7.	US Coteaux de Seille (8)	1–5	Union Cosnoise Sportive (5)
8.	AS Bavilliers (7)	1–2	ASPTT Dijon (5)
9.	FC Chalon (6)	1–1 (3–4 p)	Jura Dolois Football (5)

=== Grand Est ===
A total of twenty teams will qualify from the Grand Est preliminary rounds.

In 2022–23, ES Thaon and FCO Strasbourg Koenigshoffen 06 progressed furthest in the competition, reaching the round of 32. The tier six side from Strasbourg were one of the last two remaining sides in the competition from outside the national league structure, but were eventually knocked out by a single goal against Ligue 1 side Angers in front of more than 18,000 fans at Stade de la Meinau. Thaon lost on penalties to defending champions Nantes after a goal-less tie.

On 24 July 2023, the league published the details of the dates and number of fixtures for the rounds under their organisation. A total of 935 entered from the region, with district level teams and 44 Régional 3 teams entering at the first round stage, making up a total of 360 fixtures. The remaining Régional 3 and all Régional 2 teams (a total of 160 teams) would enter at the second round stage. Régional 1 teams and Championnat National 3 teams (a total of 46 teams) would enter at the third round stage. Three Championnat National 2 would enter at the fourth round stage, and two Championnat National teams would enter at the fifth round stage.

The first round draw was published on 27 July 2023. The second round draw was published on 24 August 2023. The third round draw was published on 5 September 2023. The fourth round draw, which took place on 19 September 2023, was published in separate parts for the East, Central and West sectors. The fifth round draw was published on 4 October 2023. The sixth and final regional round was drawn on 18 October 2023.

These matches were played on 28 and 29 October 2023.

Sixth Round Results: Grand Est
Tie no	Home team (Tier)	Score	Away team (Tier)
1.	FC Bogny (6)	0–0 (4–5 p)	ES Villerupt-Thil (6)
2.	Athletic Cuvry Augny (9)	0–3	EF Reims Sainte-Anne (5)
3.	FC Métropole Troyenne (5)	3–1	FC Nogentais (6)
4.	Chaumont FC (6)	3–1	FC Côte des Blancs (7)
5.	JS Audunoise (8)	0–4	SAS Épinal (3)
6.	ES Fagnières (6)	0–1	ES Thaon (5)
7.	FC Éloyes (7)	1–2	Jarville JF (6)
8.	AS Pagny-sur-Moselle (6)	0–4	APM Metz (6)
9.	SR Saint-Dié (7)	0–1	US Thionville Lusitanos (5)
10.	FC Saint-Meziery (6)	3–2	FC Hagondange (7)
11.	US Rémering Villing (10)	0–7	SSEP Hombourg-Haut (6)
12.	Sarreguemines FC (6)	4–0	US Reipertswiller (6)
13.	Association Still-Mutzig (6)	1–1 (2–4 p)	FC Mulhouse (6)
14.	FC Saint-Louis Neuweg (6)	1–1 (2–4 p)	FCSR Haguenau (4)
15.	FCSR Obernai (7)	0–7	SR Colmar (4)
16.	US Sarre-Union (5)	2–1	AS Illzach Modenheim (6)
17.	FCE Schirrhein (7)	1–2	FC Geispolsheim 01 (6)
18.	FC Soleil Bischheim (6)	0–4	ASC Biesheim (4)
19.	AS Erstein (7)	1–3	US Forbach (6)
20.	FC Schweighouse-sur-Moder (7)	2–1	AS Theodore Ruelisheim Wittenheim (8)

=== Méditerranée ===
A total of five teams will qualify from the Méditerranée preliminary rounds.

In 2022–23, RC Grasse progressed furthest in the competition, reaching the round of 32, before losing on penalties to Ligue 2 Rodez after a goal-less match.

The first round draw was published, initially via the league's Facebook site, on 2 August 2023. All teams from district level leagues and Régional 2 entered at this stage, with a total of 194 teams drawn. The second round draw, including the 11 teams from Régional 1, was made on 30 August 2023.

The third round draw, including 6 teams from Championnat National 3, was published on 6 September 2023. The fourth round draw, including 6 teams from Championnat National 2, was published on 19 September 2023. The fifth round, including the two teams from Championnat National wa published on 3 October 2023. The sixth and final regional round was drawn on 17 October 2023.

These matches were played on 28 and 29 October 2023.

Sixth Round Results: Méditerranée
Tie no	Home team (Tier)	Score	Away team (Tier)
1.	ES Fosséenne (5)	1–1 (6–5 p)	Marignane Gignac Côte Bleue FC (3)
2.	SC Montredon Bonneveine (7)	0–3	AS Cannes (4)
3.	US Mandelieu-La Napoule (7)	0–1	Aubagne FC (4)
4.	FC Istres (5)	0–0 (3–4 p)	Hyères FC (4)
5.	FC Martigues (3)	1–0	RC Grasse (4)

=== Occitanie ===
A total of ten teams will qualify from the Occitanie preliminary rounds. Qualifying starts in August 2023.

In 2022–23, seventh-tier Montauban FCTG reached the eighth-round stage for the second successive season, along with three other teams from the regional qualifying rounds: sixth-tier Union Saint-Estève Espoir Perpignan Méditerannée Métropole, and fifth tier duo Onet-le-Château Football and US Colomiers Football. Montauban FCTG were heavily beaten by Nîmes in a game interrupted by crowd trouble. Saint-Estève lost on penalties to Hyères FC. Colomiers and Onet-le-Château both lost, by a single goal, to Pau FC and RC Grasse respectively.

On 18 July 2023, the league announced that 490 teams from the region had entered the competition, and that 376 teams from the district divisions and Régional 3 would enter at the first round stage, with 30 teams from these levels exempt to the second round based on the number of teams in each district and their progress in the competition last season. On the same day, the draw for the first two rounds took place live on the league's Facebook page. Although the draw for all ties took place at the same time, the outcome was still published district by district.

The third round draw, featuring the 9 teams from Championnat National 3, was published on 5 September 2023. The fourth round draw, featuring the 2 teams from Championnat National 2, was published on 19 September 2023. The fifth round draw, which saw the one team from Championnat National join the competition, was published on 4 October 2023. The sixth and final regional round was drawn on 18 October 2023.

These matches were played on 28 and 29 October 2023. One was rearranged for 5 November 2023 after a decision from the previous round was overruled.

Sixth Round Results: Occitanie
Tie no	Home team (Tier)	Score	Away team (Tier)
1.	Canet Roussillon FC (5)	3–1	US Seysses-Frouzins (6)
2.	FC Vauverdois (7)	1–4	Nîmes Olympique (3)
3.	Figeac Capdenac Quercy FC (7)	0–0 (5–6 p)	Blagnac FC (5)
4.	AS Fabrègues (6)	1–1 (7–6 p)	AS Muret (6)
5.	US Revel (6)	1–0	AS Atlas Paillade (6)
6.	Toulouse Métropole FC (6)	1–1 (5–4 p)	FU Narbonne (6)
7.	RCO Agde (5)	2–2 (0–3 p)	US Castanéenne (5)
8.	Olympique Alès (4)	2–1	Stade Beaucairois (5)
9.	FC Alberes Argelès (5)	0–0 (5–6 p)	Auch Football (6)
10.	AS Lavernose-Lherm-Mauzac (8)	0–0 (3–2 p)	GC Uchaud (7)

=== Hauts-de-France ===
A total of twenty-one teams will qualify from the Hauts-de-France preliminary rounds.

In 2022–23, US Pays de Cassel from the sixth tier progressed to the round of 32, beating teams from one and two divisions above them, before being drawn against Paris Saint-Germain. They faced the Ligue 1 team from the capital at a Ligue 1 stadium, Stade Bollaert-Delelis, in front of a capacity crowd, but were on the wrong end of a seven-goal result.

Draws for the first two rounds were carried out separately by districts. Draws were published on 20 July 2023 (Flandres), 3 August 2023 (Escaut), 8 August 2023 (Côte d'Opale), 21 August 2023 (Artois), and 22 August 2023 (Aisne). The districts of Oise and Somme did not publish their draws separately. A total of 359 ties were drawn, with all entrants being from the district level leagues.

From the third round, the draw was integrated. The third round draw, featuring the eight teams from Championnat National 3 was broadcast live on the league's Facebook page on 8 September 2023. The fourth round draw, featuring the teams from Championnat National 2, took place on 21 September 2023. The fifth round draw took place on 5 October 2023. The sixth and final regional draw was made on 19 October 2023.

These matches were played on 28 and 29 October 2023.

Sixth Round Results: Hauts-de-France
Tie no	Home team (Tier)	Score	Away team (Tier)
1.	SA Le Quesnoy (8)	1–1 (2–1 p)	Espérance Calonne Liévin (9)
2.	ES Villers-Outréaux (8)	1–3	FC Chambly Oise (4)
3.	IC La Sentinelle (8)	0–4	ESC Longueau (6)
4.	Arras FA (6)	1–1 (3–4 p)	RC Calais (6)
5.	US Corbie (9)	0–3 (Note: Match abandoned after 78 minutes, due objects being thrown from the stand. US Corbie penalised, US Camon qualify.)	US Camon (7)
6.	Olympique Héninois (10)	0–2	US Nœux-les-Mines (6)
7.	RC Doullens (9)	4–0	AS Verneuil-en-Halatte (9)
8.	US Chantilly (5)	1–1 (4–2 p)	AC Cambrai (6)
9.	Calonne-Ricouart FC Cite 6 (8)	3–3 (0–3 p)	US Saint-Omer (6)
10.	Bondues FC (6)	1–1 (4–3 p)	US Maubeuge (6)
11.	Montdidier AC (8)	0–0 (7–6 p)	Saint-Amand FC (5)
12.	US Leffrinckoucke (9)	0–6	Iris Club de Croix (5)
13.	Écureuils Itancourt-Neuville (6)	5–0	Wasquehal Football (4)
14.	FC Raismes (7)	0–1	FC Loon-Plage (6)
15.	US Blériot-Plage (8)	2–2 (5–4 p)	CS Avion (6)
16.	ES Anzin-Saint-Aubin (7)	0–7	Entente Feignies Aulnoye FC (4)
17.	Olympique Grande-Synthe (6)	1–2	US Boulogne (4)
18.	ES Calaisis Coulogne (8)	0–2	US Choisy-au-Bac (6)
19.	SR Lomme Délivrance (10)	0–5	US Le Pays du Valois (5)
20.	US Provin (6)	1–1 (4–1 p)	Stade Portelois (7)
21.	US Gouvieux (7)	1–5	US Laon (6)

=== Normandy ===
A total of nine teams will qualify from the Normandy preliminary rounds.

In 2022–23, the two teams from the region that progressed furthest in the main competition were US Avranches and AF Virois, who both reached the round of 64. Both lost 2–0 at that stage, to Brest and Nantes respectively.

On 26 June 2023, the league announced that 383 teams from the region had registered for the competition. The draw for the first round, with 129 ties featuring teams from Regional and Departmental divisions, was published on 18 July 2023. The second round draw was published on 22 August 2023, and saw the entry of 107 teams from the Regional divisions.

The third round draw, which saw the five exempted regional teams and the nine teams from Championnat National 3 enter, was published on 31 August 2023. The fourth round draw, featuring the two teams from Championnat National 2, was carried out on 19 September 2023. The fifth round draw, featuring the two teams from Championnat National, was made on 3 October 2023. The sixth and final regional round draw was made on 19 October 2023.

These matches were played on 28 and 29 October 2023.

Sixth Round Results: Normandy
Tie no	Home team (Tier)	Score	Away team (Tier)
1.	ESM Gonfreville (6)	2–3	AS Villers Houlgate Côte Fleurie (5)
2.	FC Flers (5)	2–0	CMS Oissel (5)
3.	FC Pays Aiglon (8)	1–3	FC Dieppe (5)
4.	AG Caennaise (5)	2–2 (5–4 p)	Le Havre Caucriauville Sportif (6)
5.	JS Douvres (7)	1–0	Leopards Saint-Georges (8)
6.	ES Pointe Hague (8)	1–3	SU Dives-Cabourg (5)
7.	US Avranches (3)	0–0 (3–1 p)	AF Virois (4)
8.	La Croix Vallée d'Eure (10)	1–1 (2–4 p)	FC Équeurdreville-Hainneville (6)
9.	FC Barentinois (8)	0–5	FC Rouen (3)

=== Brittany ===
A total of fifteen teams will qualify from the Brittany preliminary rounds.

In 2022–23, Stade Plabennécois progressed furthest in the main competition, reaching the round of 32, where they lost by a single goal to Grenoble.

On 27 June 2023, the league announced that 681 teams had entered the competition from the region. The draw for the first round was published on 25 August 2023, featuring 446 teams.

The second round draw was published on 30 August 2023, with 219 teams entering at this stage.

The third round draw was published on 6 September 2023, with 12 teams from Championnat National 3 and the qualifying team from Saint-Pierre-et-Miquelon entering at this stage. The fourth round draw, which saw the 3 teams from Championnat National 2 enter, was made on 20 September 2023. The fifth round draw was made on 4 October 2023. The sixth and final regional round draw was made on 18 October 2023.

These matches were played on 28 and 29 October 2023.

Sixth round results: Brittany
Tie no	Home team (tier)	Score	Away team (tier)
1.	AS Ménimur (6)	0–5	US Saint-Malo (4)
2.	AS Ginglin Cesson (6)	1–1 (2–4 p)	Stade Briochin (4)
3.	Vannes OC (5)	1–1 (2–4 p)	GSI Pontivy (5)
4.	RC Ploumagoar (7)	1–2	Stade Pontivyen (5)
5.	Cercle Paul Bert Bréquigny (5)	1–4	PD Ergué-Gabéric (5)
6.	Stade Plabennécois (5)	3–1	Guipavas GdR (6)
7.	Keriolets de Pluvigner (6)	0–1	Dinan Léhon FC (4)
8.	AC Rennes (8)	0–1	US Châteaugiron (8)
9.	Plouhinec FC (7)	1–4	AS Vitré (5)
10.	FC Beauregard Rennes (7)	0–0 (2–3 p)	EA Saint-Renan (6)
11.	ES Plescop (7)	0–2	US Fougères (5)
12.	AS Vignoc-Hédé-Guipel (6)	0–3	Stade Paimpolais FC (7)
13.	Plougastel FC (6)	1–0	Loudéac OSC (6)
14.	US Liffré (6)	1–0	Espérance Chartres-de-Bretagne (6)
15.	AS Plobannalec-Lesconil (7)	1–3	TA Rennes (5)

=== Paris-Île-de-France ===
A total of eleven teams will progress from the Paris-Île-de-France preliminary rounds.

In 2022–23, ESA Linas-Montlhéry progressed furthest in the main competition, reaching the round of 64, where they lost to Lens.

On 18 April 2023, the league announced that 478 teams had entered thus far, and that two rounds of the competition would take place before the summer break. The first round, featuring 368 teams from the district level divisions, took place on the weekend of 21 May 2023, with 183 fixtures, and one team given a bye. 89 teams from the Regional level divisions entered at the second round on the weekend of 11 June 2023, to participate in 136 fixtures.

The third round draw, featuring the 12 teams from Championnat National 3 and five byes from the second round, was published on 30 August 2023, with nine clubs given byes to the fourth round. The fourth round draw, featuring the five teams from Championnat National 2 and nine byes from the third round, took place on 19 September 2023. The fifth round draw, featuring the two teams from Championnat National, took place on 3 October 2023. The sixth and final regional round draw was made on 18 October 2023.

These matches were played on 28 and 29 October 2023.

Sixth Round Results: Paris-Île-de-France
Tie no	Home team (Tier)	Score	Away team (Tier)
1.	Olympique Noisy-le-Sec (7)	1–1 (5–4 p)	US Créteil-Lusitanos (4)
2.	FC Versailles 78 (3)	1–1 (4–5 p)	FC Fleury 91 (4)
3.	Saint-Michel FC 91 (9)	3–0	FC Massy 91 (8)
4.	Blanc-Mesnil SF (6)	0–1	Racing Club de France Football (4)
5.	FC Plessis-Robinson (6)	3–3 (4–1 p)	Saint-Brice FC (6)
6.	Saint-Denis US (6)	5–2	ES Viry-Châtillon (7)
7.	Entente SSG (5)	0–0 (3–0 p)	FCM Aubervilliers (4)
8.	US Torcy (6)	2–0	AS Chatou (5)
9.	Espérance Aulnay (6)	1–3	Red Star FC (3)
10.	FC Écouen (9)	0–1	AC Houilles (6)
11.	US Villejuif (6)	2–2 (10–9 p)	FC Morangis-Chilly (7)

=== Auvergne-Rhône-Alpes ===
A total of twenty teams will qualify from the Auvergne-Rhône-Alpes preliminary rounds.

In 2022–23, three teams from the regional qualifying rounds reached the round of 32. Chambéry SF and FC Chamalières lost heavily, to Lyon and Paris FC respectively. Le Puy Foot 43 Auvergne went out on penalties to Vierzon FC.

On 19 July 2023, the league announced 919 teams had entered the competition. The first round draw was made on 25 and 26 July 2023, with 353 ties drawn. The second round draw was made on 29 August 2023, with 251 ties drawn, involving the 17 district level teams exempted from the first round, and the teams from Régional 2 and Régional 3 divisions.

The third round draw was published on 6 September 2023, with 150 ties drawn, involving the teams from Régional 1 and Championnat National 3 for the first time. The fourth round draw, featuring the six teams from Championnat National 2 was published on 20 September 2023. The fifth round draw, featuring the two teams from Championnat National, was made on 3 October 2023. The sixth and final regional round was drawn on 18 October 2023.

These matches were played on 28 and 29 October 2023.

Sixth Round Results: Auvergne-Rhône-Alpes
Tie no	Home team (Tier)	Score	Away team (Tier)
1.	Ambert Livradois Sud (8)	0–2	Velay FC (6)
2.	US Saint-Galmier-Chambœuf (8)	1–2	FC Limonest Dardilly Saint-Didier (5)
3.	Roannais Foot 42 (7)	3–0	CS Viriat (8)
4.	FC Vaulx-en-Velin (5)	1–2	US Feurs (5)
5.	Le Puy Foot 43 Auvergne (4)	3–0	Chassieu Décines FC (5)
6.	AS Domérat (6)	1–1 (5–4 p)	Andrézieux-Bouthéon FC (4)
7.	Aurillac FC (6)	0–0 (4–5 p)	FC Roche-Saint-Genest (7)
8.	US Mozac (7)	0–2	FC Villefranche Beaujolais (3)
9.	Saint-Chamond Foot (7)	1–2	CS Volvic (6)
10.	AS Saint-Genès-Champanelle (7)	1–5	FC Espaly (5)
11.	FC Plaine Tonique (8)	0–5	Football Bourg-en-Bresse Péronnas 01 (4)
12.	Oyonnax Plastics Vallée FC (7)	1–7	AS Saint-Priest (5)
13.	GFA Rumilly-Vallières (5)	1–1 (3–4 p)	Lyon La Duchère (5)
14.	OC Eybens (8)	0–2	FC Bourgoin-Jallieu (4)
15.	CS Neuville (6)	3–1	Ain Sud (5)
16.	FC Péageois (8)	1–5	Thonon Evian Grand Genève FC (4)
17.	FC Chaponnay-Marennes (7)	3–1	US Annecy-le-Vieux (7)
18.	AS Misérieux-Trévoux (6)	1–1 (7–8 p)	Chambéry SF (5)
19.	FC Seyssins (9)	1–1 (4–2 p)	AS Montchat Lyon (7)
20.	Hauts Lyonnais (5)	2–1	FC Rhône Vallées (6)
