= Stade de l'Épopée =

Stadium in Calais, France

Stade de l'Épopee
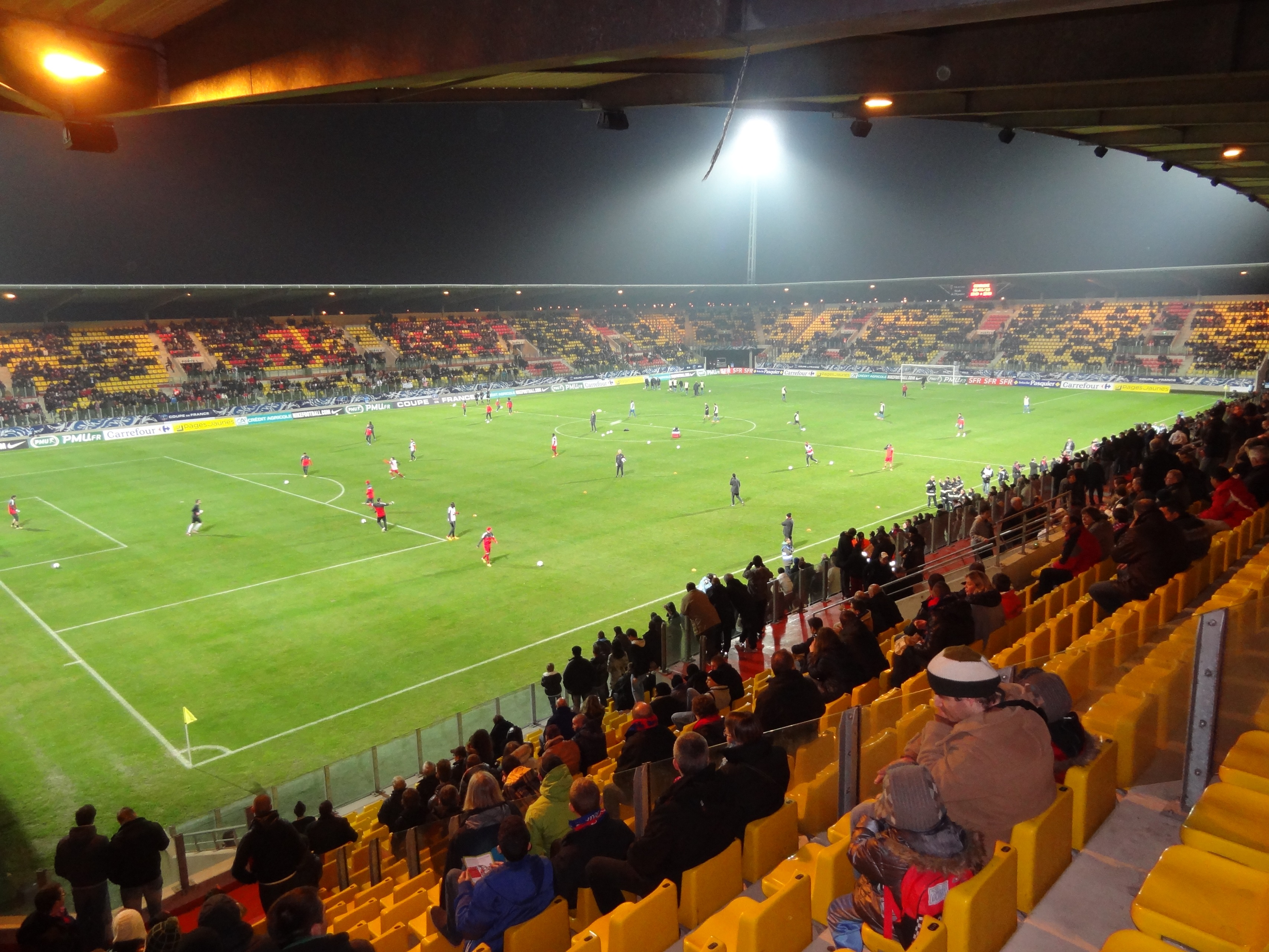
- Interactive map of Stade de l'Épopee
- Address: Rue Roger-Martin-du-Gard, 62100 Calais
- Location: Calais, France
- Coordinates: 50.956998°N 1.899322°E
- Owner: City of Calais
- Operator: City of Calais
- Capacity: 12,432
- Surface: Natural grass
- Record attendance: 11,825; Calais RUFC v Stade Lavallois; 27 September 2008
- Field size: 105 m × 68 m

Construction
- Groundbreaking: 22 March 2007
- Opened: 27 September 2008
- Cost: €22 million
- Architect: Paulin-Mariotti

Tenants
- Calais RUFC (2008–2017); Amicale Pascal Calais (2018–2019); Grand Calais Football Féminin (2014–2019); Grand Calais Pascal FC (2019–2023); RC Calais (2023–present)

The Stade de l'Épopée (French pronunciation: [stad də lepɔpe]) is a stadium in Calais, France. It is currently used for football matches, and is the home stadium of Championnat National 3 club RC Calais. The stadium holds about 12,000 spectators.

The first game played at the stadium was a 4–1 win for Stade Lavallois over former tenants Calais RUFC on 27 September 2008.

== See also ==
- List of football stadiums in France
- Lists of stadiums
