= RC Calais =

Football club based in Calais, France

- Full name: Racing Club de Calais
- Founded: 14 June 2023; 2 years ago
- Ground: Stade de l'Épopée
- Capacity: 12,432
- President: Nicolas Bouloy
- League: Régional 1
- 2024–25: National 3 Group E, 13th of 14 (Relegated)
- Website: https://www.rccalais.fr/

Racing Club Calais is a football club based in Calais, France. It was founded in 2023 from a merger of Grand Calais Pascal FC and Calais FC Hauts-de-France. As of the 2025–26 season, it competes in the Régional 1, the sixth tier of French football.

== History ==
In 2017, Calais RUFC ceased operations due to financial issues. Among the successor clubs in the city were Calais FC Hauts-de-France and Grand Calais Pascal FC. In 2023, the two clubs merged to create a new club called Racing Club Calais. The first team would start in the Régional 1, the sixth tier of French football, where Grand Calais Pascal FC had been playing prior to the merger.

On 18 November 2023, in the seventh round of the 2023–24 Coupe de France, Calais secured a 2–1 victory over ESC Longueau thanks to stoppage time goals from Claudio Beauvue and Axel Prohouly, setting up a match against Ligue 2 side Caen in the following round. In the match on 9 December, Calais took the lead in the eleventh minute thanks to a goal from Redwan Aboukassem, but were unable to hold the result, with Caen scoring four goals in the second half, including three after the 80th minute, to win 4–1. At the end of the 2023–24 Régional 1 season, Calais finished first in Group C, advancing to the promotion play-offs against the other group winners. They went on to defeat both Béthune and Arras in penalty shoot-outs to secure Championnat National 3 football.

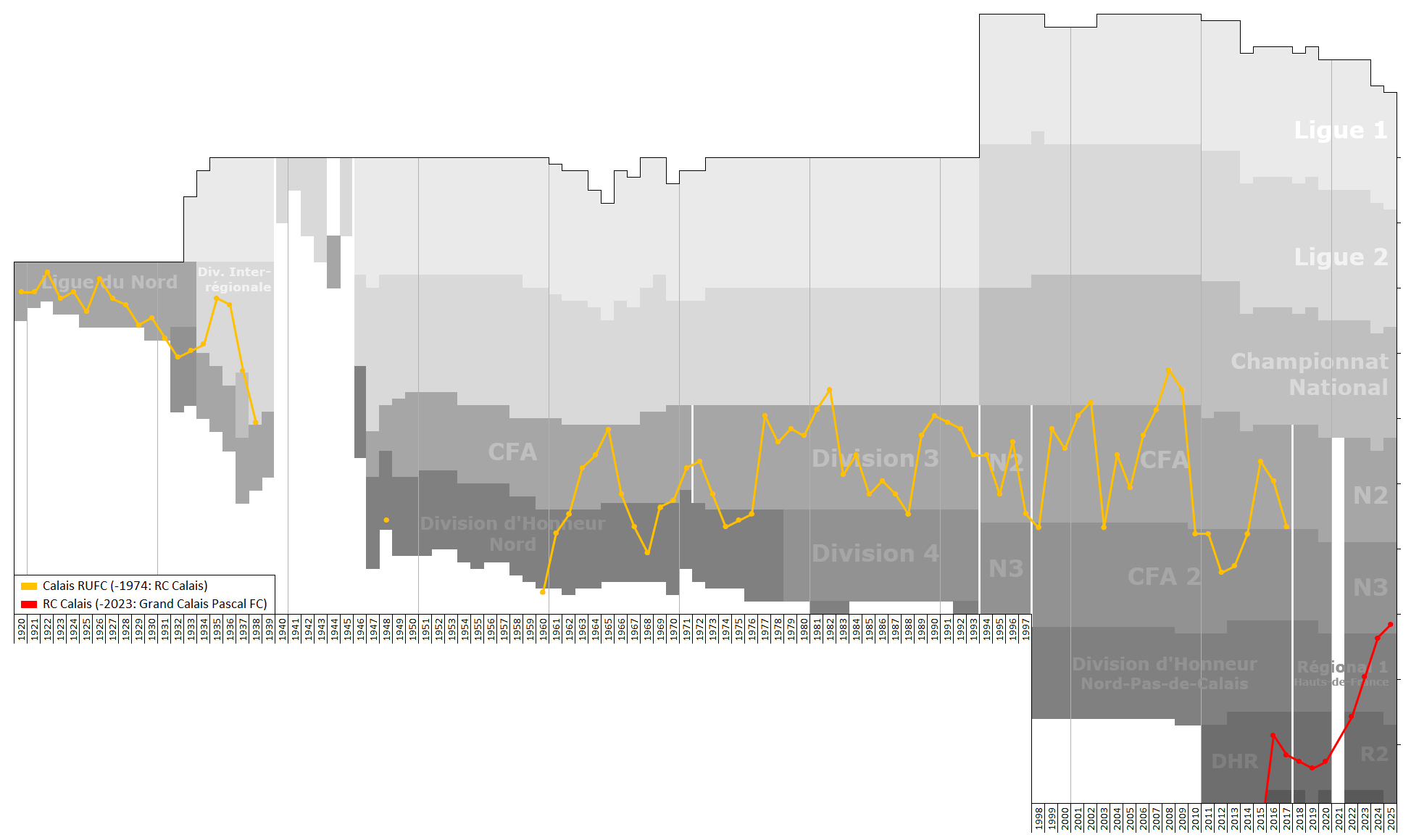
Historical league performance chart of Calais football clubs

== Players ==
As of 19 November 2023

Note: Flags indicate national team as defined under FIFA eligibility rules; some limited exceptions apply. Players may hold more than one non-FIFA nationality.

No.	Pos.	Nation	Player
—	GK	FRA	Théo Comyn
—	GK	FRA	Nicolas Level
—	DF	FRA	Sean Belvalette
—	DF	FRA	Julien Bertoux
—	DF	FRA	Florian Cosyn
—	DF	FRA	Robin Denquin
—	DF	FRA	Alexandre Gobert
—	DF	FRA	Théo Loridan
—	DF	FRA	Hugo Mille
—	DF	FRA	Tristan Schille
—	DF	FRA	François Theron

No.	Pos.	Nation	Player
—	DF	FRA	Medhy John Varane
—	MF	FRA	Redwan Aboukassem
—	MF	FRA	Thibault Demassieux
—	MF	FRA	Erwan Le Sech
—	MF	FRA	Luca Pélissier
—	MF	FRA	Axel Prohouly
—	MF	FRA	Ibrahima Touré
—	FW	FRA	Claudio Beauvue
—	FW	GUI	Daouda Camara
—	FW	FRA	Robin Knockaert
