= Olympique Grande-Synthe =

French football club

- Full name: Olympique Grande-Synthe Football
- Founded: 1963; 62 years ago
- Ground: Stade Deconinck
- Capacity: 1,500
- Chairman: Fatis Areski
- Manager: Pascal Langlois
- League: Régional 1 Hauts-de-France
- 2019–20: National 3 Group I, 12th (relegated)
- Website: https://ogsfootball.footeo.com
Home colours	Away colours

Olympique Grande-Synthe Football (French pronunciation: [ɔlɛ̃pik ɡʁɑ̃d sɛ̃t]; commonly referred to as OGS or simply Grande-Synthe) is a French football club based in Grande-Synthe in the Nord-Pas-de-Calais region. The club plays in the Régional 1, the sixth tier of French football, after being relegated from 2019–20 Championnat National 3.

== History ==
The club was founded in 1963 and is a part of a sports club that consists of several other sports. The club is known for being the starting point for the careers of goalkeeper Rémy Vercoutre, centre back José-Karl Pierre-Fanfan, and midfielder Geoffrey Dernis.
