= FC Loon-Plage =

Football club in Loon-Plage, France

Loon-Plage
- Full name: Football Club de Loon-Plage
- Stadium: Stade Marcel Rosseel
- Capacity: 1,000
- President: Franck Milliot
- League: Régional 1 Hauts-de-France; Group A
- Website: https://www.facebook.com/pages/FOOTBALL-CLUB-DE-LOON-PLAGE/171893466200144

Football Club de Loon-Plage is a football club located in Loon-Plage, France. They play in the Régional 1, the sixth tier of French football. The club's colours are blue and red.

The furthest round in which the club has played in the Coupe de France is the round of 64, which they reached in the 2020–21 edition, losing 3–0 to third-tier Boulogne, and in the 2022–23 edition, losing 7–0 to top flight Reims.
