= US Saint-Omer =

French football club

USPSO
- Full name: Union Sportive Pays de Saint-Omer
- Founded: 1894; 132 years ago
- Ground: Stade Gaston Bonnet
- Capacity: 4,600
- League: Régional 1 Hauts-de-France
- 2021–22: National 3 Group I, 12th (relegated)

Union Sportive Pays de Saint-Omer (USPSO) is a French association football team founded in 1894. They are based in Saint-Omer, France. As of the 2022–23 season, they play in the sixth tier in the French football league system. They play at the Stade Gaston Bonnet in Saint-Omer. The team colours are white shirts and black shorts.

The team was known as Union Sportive de Saint-Omer until 2020, when a merger with FC Tatinghem took place, and the name Union Sportive Pays de Saint-Omer was taken. This coincided with promotion to Championnat National 3.

Their best-ever performance in the French Cup saw them reach the last 16 in season 1991–92 before losing 2–4 to AS Monaco at home. In season 2008–09, they knocked SC Amiens (a Ligue 2 side) out of the same competition in the seventh round.
