= Bourgeois (surname) =

Bourgeois is a French surname.

== Geographical distribution ==
As of 2014, 49.6% of all known bearers of the surname Bourgeois were residents of France (frequency 1:1,819), 24.8% of the United States (1:19,760), 15.8% of Canada (1:3,157), 5.4% of Belgium (1:2,892) and 1.5% of Switzerland (1:7,254).

In France, the frequency of the surname was higher than national average (1:1,819) in the following regions:

1. Bourgogne-Franche-Comté (1:548)
2. Guadeloupe (1:758)
3. Saint Pierre and Miquelon (1:914)
4. Centre-Val de Loire (1:1,127)
5. Hauts-de-France (1:1,238)
6. Grand Est (1:1,575)
7. Île-de-France (1:1,718)
8. Normandy (1:1,802)

== Notable people ==
- Adèle Bourgeois (1870–1935), French-Canadian author, composer
- Albéric Bourgeois (1876–1962), Canadian comic strip artist
- Alex Bourgeois, Belgian fencer
- Alfred Bourgeois (1964–2020), American murderer
- Alfred Edmond Bourgeois (1872–1939), Canadian politician
- Alyssa Bourgeois (born 2002), American professional soccer player
- Amandine Bourgeois (born 1979), French singer
- André Bourgeois (1928–2015), Belgian politician
- André Bourgeois (figure skater), Canadian figure skater
- Aubrey J. Bourgeois (1907–2011), United States Navy admiral
- Bernard Bourgeois (1929–2024), French philosopher
- Bradley Bourgeois (born 1994), American soccer player
- Brent Bourgeois (born 1958), American rock musician and producer
- Célia Bourgeois (born 1983), French cross-country skier
- Charles Bourgeois (1879–1940), Canadian politician
- Charles-François Bourgeois (1759–1821), French general
- Charlie Bourgeois (born 1959), Canadian ice hockey defenseman
- Cheryllee Bourgeois, Métis midwife and educator
- Constant Bourgeois (1767–1841), French landscape painter and engraver
- Dana Bourgeois (born 1953), American luthier
- David Bourgeois, American composer, producer, drummer, sound designer and voice over director
- Derek Bourgeois (1941–2017), English composer
- Désiré Bourgeois (1908–1996), Belgian footballer
- Diane Bourgeois (born 1949), Canadian politician
- Dick Bourgeois-Doyle, Canadian writer and science administrator
- Douglas Bourgeois (born 1951), American sculptor and painter
- Élodie Bourgeois-Pin (born 1982), French cross-country skier
- Émile Bourgeois (1857–1934), French historian
- Eugène Bourgeois (1818–1847), French dramatist and writer
- Francis Bourgeois (1756–1811), British landscape painter and court painter to George III
- Francis Bourgeois (trainspotter) (Luke Nicolson, born 2000), British social media influencer and trainspotter
- Freddy Bourgeois (born 1997), French footballer
- Frédéric Bourgeois de Mercey (1803–1860), French painter, art critic, travel writer and novelist
- Gaël Bourgeois (born 1983), Swiss politician
- Geert Bourgeois (born 1951), Flemish politician
- Georges Bourgeois (1913–1978), French judicial officer and politician
- Gérard Bourgeois (1874–1944), French film director
- Guy Bourgeois (born 1958), Canadian politician
- Hélène Bourgeois Leclerc (born 1974), Canadian actress
- Jacques Bourgeois (1912–1996), French musicologist
- Jason Bourgeois (born 1982), American baseball player
- Jean Bourgeois, Roman Catholic prelate
- Jean-Louis Bourgeois (1940–2022), American author, son of Louise Bourgeois and Robert Goldwater
- Jean-Marie Bourgeois (1939–2020), French skier
- Jeanne Bourgeois (1873–1956), French actress and singer
- Joël Bourgeois (born 1971), Canadian distance runner
- John R. Bourgeois, American conductor
- Joseph W. Bourgeois (1901–1977), Canadian politician
- Joska Bourgeois (c. 1913–1994), Belgian businesswoman
- Jules Bourgeois (1847–1911), French entomologist
- Léon Bourgeois (1851–1925), French statesman
- Lloyd Bourgeois (1903–1968), American athlete
- Louis Bourgeois (disambiguation), several people
- Louise Bourgeois (1911–2010), French-American artist and sculptor
- Luke Bourgeois (born 1977), Australian tennis player
- Manuel Bourgeois, Swiss footballer
- Marc Louis Bourgeois (1934–2025), French neuropsychiatrist and psychiatrist
- Marie Bourgeois (1870–1937), French chef
- Marie-Thérèse Bourgeois Chouteau (1733–1814), American matriarch
- Maxime Bourgeois (born 1991), French footballer
- Michel Bourgeois (1940–2022), French politician
- Morgane Bourgeois (born 2003), French rugby union player
- Paul Bourgeois (disambiguation), several people
- Paulette Bourgeois (born 1951), Canadian children's writer
- Pierre Bourgeois (1898–1976), Belgian poet
- Pierre Étienne Bourgeois de Boynes (1718–1783), French magistrate and statesman
- Robyn Bourgeois, Canadian activist, academic, author and educator
- Roy Bourgeois (born 1938), American human rights activist
- Steve Bourgeois (born 1972), American baseball pitcher
- Thibault Bourgeois (born 1990), French footballer
- Thomas Bourgeois, American Paralympic athlete
- Thomas-Louis Bourgeois (1676–1750s), French composer and singer
- Victor Bourgeois (1897–1962), Belgian Modernist architect
- Victor-Ferdinand Bourgeois (1870–1957), French painter and illustrator
- Yoann Bourgeois (born 1981), French dancer, choreographer and artist
- Yvonne Bourgeois (1902–1983), French tennis player

== See also ==
- Élie Bourgois (1881–1946), French gymnast
- Philippe Bourgois, professor of anthropology and the author of ethnographic works
- Siméon Bourgois (1815–1887), 19th-century French Navy officer
