= 2000–01 AS Cannes season =

AS Cannes
2000–01 season
- Manager: Roland Gransard
- Stadium: Stade Pierre de Coubertin
- French Division 2: 19th (relegated)
- Coupe de France: Round of 64
- Coupe de la Ligue: Round of 32
- Top goalscorer: League: David Suarez (13); All: David Suarez (13)
- Biggest win: Cannes 3–0 Angers

The 2000–01 season was Association Sportive de Cannes Football's 99th season in existence and the club's third consecutive season in the second division of French football. In addition to the domestic league, Cannes participated in this season's edition of the Coupe de France and the Coupe de la Ligue. The season covered the period from 1 July 2000 to 30 June 2001.

== Pre-season and friendlies ==
Win Draw Loss

11 March 2001 Friendly	Cannes (France)	2–1	(France) Marseille	France
CET (UTC+1)	Sadani 68'; Sivestri 82'		Pouget 77'	Attendance: 800

== Competitions ==
=== Overview ===
Competition	First match	Last match	Starting round	Final position	Record							
Competition	First match	Last match	Starting round	Final position	Pld	W	D	L	GF	GA	GD	Win %
French Division 2	29 July 2000	18 May 2001	Matchday 1	19th	38	8	10	20	45	66	−21	21.05
Coupe de France	26 November 2000	20 January 2001	Seventh round	Round of 64	3	2	0	1	5	3	+2	66.67
Coupe de la Ligue	5 January 2001		Round of 32	Round of 32	1	0	0	1	1	2	−1	0.00
Total					42	10	10	22	51	71	−20	23.81

Source: Competitions

=== French Division 2 ===
==== League table ====
Pos	Team	Pld	W	D	L	GF	GA	GD	Pts	Promotion or Relegation
16	Créteil	38	10	13	15	37	43	−6	43	
17	Caen	38	11	10	17	38	53	−15	43	
18	Martigues	38	8	15	15	30	46	−16	39	
19	Cannes (R)	38	8	10	20	45	66	−21	34	Relegation to Championnat National [fr]
20	Angers (R)	38	7	12	19	35	60	−25	33	Relegation to Championnat National [fr]

Source: Ligue 2
(R) Relegated

==== Results summary ====
Overall								Home						Away					
Pld	W	D	L	GF	GA	GD	Pts	W	D	L	GF	GA	GD	W	D	L	GF	GA	GD
38	8	10	20	45	66	−21	34	6	7	6	26	22	+4	2	3	14	19	44	−25

==== Results by round ====
Round	1	2	3	4	5	6	7	8	9	10	11	12	13	14	15	16	17	18	19	20	21	22	23	24	25	26	27	28	29	30	31	32	33	34	35	36	37	38
Ground	A	H	A	H	A	H	A	A	H	A	H	A	H	A	H	A	H	A	H	A	H	A	H	A	H	H	A	H	A	H	A	H	A	H	A	H	A	H
Result	D	W	D	D	L	W	L	L	L	D	L	L	L	L	L	L	W	L	D	L	W	W	D	W	D	D	L	D	L	L	L	D	L	W	L	L	L	W
Position	9	4	6	7	11	8	11	13	13	15	15	19	20	20	20	20	19	19	19	19	19	18	18	16	17	18	18	19	19	19	19	19	19	19	19	19	19	19

A = Away; H = Home; W = Win; D = Draw; L = Loss

==== Matches ====
29 July 2000 1	Caen	2–2	Cannes	Caen
CEST (UTC+2)

5 August 2000 2	Cannes	6–4	Niort	Cannes
CEST (UTC+2)				Stadium: Stade Pierre de Coubertin

12 August 2000 3	Ajaccio	3–3	Cannes	Ajaccio
CEST (UTC+2)

19 August 2000 4	Cannes	0–0	Martigues	Cannes
CEST (UTC+2)				Stadium: Stade Pierre de Coubertin

26 August 2000 5	Le Mans	2–0	Cannes	Le Mans
CEST (UTC+2)

29 August 2000 6	Cannes	3–0	Angers	Cannes
CEST (UTC+2)				Stadium: Stade Pierre de Coubertin

1 September 2000 7	Châteauroux	2–0	Cannes	Châteauroux
CEST (UTC+2)

6 September 2000 8	Sochaux	1–0	Cannes	Montbéliard
CEST (UTC+2)

9 September 2000 9	Cannes	0–2	Nancy	Cannes
CEST (UTC+2)				Stadium: Stade Pierre de Coubertin

16 September 2000 10	Le Havre	2–2	Cannes	Le Havre
CEST (UTC+2)

23 September 2000 11	Cannes	1–2	Montpellier	Cannes
CEST (UTC+2)				Stadium: Stade Pierre de Coubertin

1 October 2000 12	Gueugnon	2–1	Cannes	Gueugnon
CEST (UTC+2)

7 October 2000 13	Cannes	0–1	Laval	Cannes
CEST (UTC+2)				Stadium: Stade Pierre de Coubertin

11 October 2000 14	Wasquehal	3–0	Cannes	Wasquehal
CEST (UTC+2)

14 October 2000 15	Cannes	1–2	Lorient	Cannes
CEST (UTC+2)				Stadium: Stade Pierre de Coubertin

21 October 2000 16	Créteil	3–1	Cannes	Créteil
CEST (UTC+2)

28 October 2000 17	Cannes	2–1	Nice	Cannes
CEST (UTC+2)				Stadium: Stade Pierre de Coubertin

4 November 2000 18	Beauvais	3–1	Cannes	Beauvais
CEST (UTC+2)

11 November 2000 19	Cannes	1–1	Nîmes	Cannes
CEST (UTC+2)				Stadium: Stade Pierre de Coubertin

18 November 2000 20	Niort	4–1	Cannes	Niort
CEST (UTC+2)

29 November 2000 21	Cannes	1–0	Ajaccio	Cannes
CEST (UTC+2)				Stadium: Stade Pierre de Coubertin

2 December 2000 22	Martigues	0–1	Cannes	Martigues
CEST (UTC+2)

9 December 2000 23	Cannes	0–0	Le Mans	Cannes
CEST (UTC+2)				Stadium: Stade Pierre de Coubertin

21 December 2000 24	Angers	1–3	Cannes	Angers
CEST (UTC+2)

13 January 2001 25	Cannes	2–2	Châteauroux	Cannes
CEST (UTC+2)				Stadium: Stade Pierre de Coubertin

27 January 2001 26	Cannes	2–2	Sochaux	Cannes
CEST (UTC+2)				Stadium: Stade Pierre de Coubertin

3 February 2001 27	Nancy	2–0	Cannes	Tomblaine
CEST (UTC+2)

7 February 2001 28	Cannes	1–1	Le Havre	Cannes
CEST (UTC+2)				Stadium: Stade Pierre de Coubertin

17 February 2001 29	Montpellier	2–0	Cannes	Montpellier
CEST (UTC+2)

3 March 2001 30	Cannes	0–1	Gueugnon	Cannes
CEST (UTC+2)				Stadium: Stade Pierre de Coubertin

17 March 2001 31	Laval	2–1	Cannes	Laval
CEST (UTC+2)

23 March 2001 32	Cannes	0–0	Wasquehal	Cannes
CEST (UTC+2)				Stadium: Stade Pierre de Coubertin

27 March 2001 33	Lorient	4–0	Cannes	Lorient
CEST (UTC+2)

7 April 2001 34	Cannes	4–2	Créteil	Cannes
CEST (UTC+2)				Stadium: Stade Pierre de Coubertin

14 April 2001 35	Nice	2–0	Cannes	Nice
CEST (UTC+2)

28 April 2001 36	Cannes	0–1	Beauvais	Cannes
CEST (UTC+2)				Stadium: Stade Pierre de Coubertin

11 May 2001 37	Nîmes	4–3	Cannes	Nîmes
CEST (UTC+2)

18 May 2001 38	Cannes	2–0	Caen	Cannes
CEST (UTC+2)				Stadium: Stade Pierre de Coubertin

=== Coupe de France ===
26 November 2000 Seventh round	Consolat	1–2 (a.e.t.)	Cannes	Marseille
CET (UTC+1)				Stadium: Stade La Martine

16 December 2000 Eighth round	Le Pontet	0–2	Cannes	Le Pontet
CET (UTC+1)				Stadium: Stade de Fargues

20 January 2001 Round of 64	Sète	2–1	Cannes	Sète
CET (UTC+1)	Moureaux 26'; Benchérif 68'		Bourgeois 14'	Stadium: Stade Louis Michel; Attendance: 3,000; Referee: Stéphane Moulin

=== Coupe de la Ligue ===
5 January 2001 Round of 32	Cannes	1–2	Valence	Cannes
20:30 CET (UTC+1)	Gohel 76'		Berville 10'; Dossevi 86'	Stadium: Stade Pierre de Coubertin; Attendance: 2,500; Referee: Jacques Badet

== Statistics ==
=== Goalscorers ===
Rank	Pos	No.	Nat	Name	Division 2	Coupe de France	Coupe de la Ligue	Total
	FW		(France)	David Suarez	13	0	0	13
	FW		(France)	Moktar Sadani	6	0	0	6
	DF		(France)	Orlando Silvestri	5	0	0	5
	FW		(France)	Wilfried Gohel	3	0	1	4
	FW		(Algeria)	Malek Cherrad	3	0	0	3
	FW		(France)	Freddy Bourgeois	0	0	1	1
Totals					27	5	2	34
