= Histoire de Détective =

- Directed by: Charles Dekeukeleire
- Written by: Maurice Casteels
- Starring: Pierre Bourgeois
- Backgrounds by: Victor Servranckx
- Release date: 1929
- Running time: 138 Minutes
- Language: French

Histoire de Détective (1929) is the third film by the Belgian director Charles Dekeukeleire. The film belongs to Dekeukeleire's avant-garde period and exudes the influence of the different avant-garde strands in Europe. Besides Histoire de Détective Dekeukeleire made three other avant-garde films: Combat de Boxe (1927), Impatience (1928) and Witte Vlam (1930).

== Plot ==
Detective T is charged by Madame Jonathan to shadow her husband, Monsieur Jonathan, due to his recent distant and distracted behavior. Monsieur Jonathan's travels lead them from Brussels to the Belgian coast, and to Luxembourg.

== Credits ==
- Director: Charles Dekeukeleire
- Screenplay: Maurice Casteels
- Starring: Pierre Bourgeois (Jonathan)
- Graphics: Victor Servranckx
