= 2022–23 Coupe de France preliminary rounds, Hauts-de-France =

The 2022–23 Coupe de France preliminary rounds, Hauts-de-France is the qualifying competition to decide which teams from the leagues of the Hauts-de-France region of France take part in the main competition from the seventh round.

A total of twenty teams will qualify from the Hauts-de-France preliminary rounds.

In 2021–22, three teams progressed as far as the round of 64. AS Beauvais Oise beat FC Chambly from the division above, before losing to ES Thaon from the division below on penalties. Entente Feignies Aulnoye FC were beaten by Paris Saint-Germain. Wasquehal Football were heavily beaten by Vannes OC.

== Draws and fixtures ==
Draws for the first two rounds were carried out separately by districts. First round draws were published in July and early August, with a total of 828 clubs featuring. Draws for the second round were in some cases published at the same time as the first round, and in some cases after the conclusion of the first round. A total of 291 ties were drawn, with 168 teams entering at this stage. Only 287 ties were scheduled due to penalties from the first round and subsequent withdrawals.

The third round draw, which saw the entry of the five remainining teams from Régional 1 and the ten from Championnat National 3, was published on the league's Facebook page on 6 September 2022. The fourth round draw, which saw the entry of the five Championnat National 2 teams from the region, was also published on the league's Facebook page on 15 September 2022.

The fifth round draw, including the only club in the region from Championnat National, was published on 29 September 2022. The sixth round draw was published on 10 October 2022.

=== First round ===
These matches were played on 27 and 28 August 2022, with one replayed on 4 September 2022.

First round results: Hauts-de-France
Tie no	Home team (tier)	Score	Away team (tier)
1.	EC Mazingarbe (10)	1–1 (6–7 p)	FC Annay (11)
2.	CS Habarcq (11)	1–1 (3–1 p)	AS Violaines (10)
3.	Atrébate FC (12)	2–0	SCF Achicourt (13)
4.	US Lapugnoy (13)	1–1 (1–3 p)	US Boubers-Conchy (12)
5.	AS Barlin (12)	0–3	FC Hinges (11)
6.	Tilloy FC (13)	2–3	US Pas-en-Artois (10)
7.	AJ Artois (11)	0–2	US Grenay (10)
8.	US Ablain (12)	3–2	Olympique Burbure (11)
9.	FC Givenchy-en-Gohelle (13)	3–0	AG Grenay (11)
10.	AS Vallée de la Ternoise (12)	2–1	RC Vaudricourt Kennedy (13)
11.	AS Neuvireuil-Gavrelle (13)	2–2 (4–3 p)	AS Maroeuil (12)
12.	OC Cojeul (12)	2–2 (8–7 p)	AJ Neuville (13)
13.	AS Bailleul-Sire-Berthoult (13)	0–1	AS Salomé (12)
14.	FC Verquigneul (13)	1–1 (5–4 p)	FC Camblain-Châtelain (11)
15.	AAE Dourges (13)	0–2	US Beuvry (11)
16.	ES Haillicourt (13)	0–2	Olympique Héninois (11)
17.	ES Vendin (11)	1–0	UAS Harnes (9)
18.	ES Ourton (14)	0–1	UC Divion (11)
19.	AS Courrièroise (11)	0–0 (6–7 p)	USO Meurchin (9)
20.	La Couture FC (10)	3–1	RC Sains (11)
21.	US Arleux-en-Gohelle (11)	2–5	US Ruch Carvin (11)
22.	US Croisette (15)	1–3	JS Bourecquoise (14)
23.	AS Bonnières Houvin (14)	2–3	FCE La Bassée (15)
24.	RC Calonne-Ricouart (15)	4–2	AS Lyssois (13)
25.	Thélus FC (15)	1–2	FC La Roupie-Isbergues (12)
26.	Olympique La Comté Omnisport (15)	0–3 (Note: Tie won by means of forfeit.)	AOSC Sallaumines (13)
27.	AEP Verdrel (14)	4–0	AS Quiéry-la-Motte (15)
28.	ES Bois-Bernard Acheville (15)	0–5	ASPTT Arras (13)
29.	FC Tortequesne (15)	2–3	AS Cauchy-à-la-Tour (13)
30.	US Ham-en-Artois (14)	1–1 (3–0 p)	ES Rœux (15)
31.	AS Kennedy Hénin-Beaumont (15)	3–0	CS Pernes (12)
32.	US Heuchin Lisbourg (14)	0–3	Olympique Vendin (12)
33.	FC Richebourg (13)	4–1	FC Dainvillois (13)
34.	FC Méricourt (14)	4–2	Entente Verquin-Béthune (12)
35.	FC Cuinchy (14)	0–5	US Hesdigneul (11)
36.	ES Ficheux (14)	2–1 (Note: Tie reversed from original draw.) (Note: AS Vendin 2000 penalised for fielding a suspended player.)	AS Vendin 2000 (13)
37.	Diables Rouges Lambres-lez-Aire (14)	3–4	SC Fouquières (12)
38.	FC Estevelles (14)	1–0	US Rivière (13)
39.	RC Bruay (14)	0–2	Olympique Arras (11)
40.	AS Pont-à-Vendin (15)	2–1	ES Eleu (12)
41.	US Mondicourt (12)	1–3	USC Monchy-Breton (13)
42.	FC Hauts Lens (13)	0–5	FC Hersin (11)
43.	AFC Libercourtois (14)	4–2	USO Drocourt (10)
44.	ES Val Sensée (12)	5–1	Intrépides Norrent-Fontes (13)
45.	AJ Ruitz (12)	0–0 (5–4 p)	RC Locon 2000 (13)
46.	FC Beaumont (13)	1–1 (0–3 p)	Olympique Liévin (11)
47.	FC Busnes (13)	2–1	US Lestrem (10)
48.	AS Auchy-les-Mines (13)	1–3	Espérance Calonne Liévin (9)
49.	JF Mazingarbe (12)	2–2 (3–5 p) (Note: AS Loison penalised for including too many transferred players on the team sheet. JF Mazingarbe qualify.)	AS Loison (11)
50.	AAE Évin-Malmaison (11)	7–2	US Izel-lès-Équerchin (12)
51.	AS Frévent (12)	0–2	FC Lillers (10)
52.	FC Servins (13)	0–8	FC Montigny-en-Gohelle (9)
53.	USO Lens (9)	6–1	ES Laventie (10)
54.	AS Brebières (10)	2–1	US Courcelles (9)
55.	US Gonnehem-Busnettes (11)	3–4	AS Lensoise (10)
56.	US Annezin (10)	10–0	Sud Artois Foot (11)
57.	ES Allouagne (12)	2–0	Auchel FC (10)
58.	ES Douvrin (12)	1–0	AC Noyelles-Godault (10)
59.	Stade Héninois (12)	3–3 (5–6 p)	OS Annequin (9)
60.	AS Sailly-Labourse (11)	0–2	ES Sainte-Catherine (9)
61.	US Houdain (11)	0–3	ESD Isbergues (9)
62.	US Croisilles (10)	2–4	AAE Aix-Noulette (11)
63.	US Cheminots Avion (11)	3–0	US Monchy-au-Bois (10)
64.	SC Artésien (9)	3–1	AS Beaurains (10)
65.	JF Guarbecque (10)	3–0	FC Bouvigny-Boyeffles (9)
66.	ES Haisnes (10)	2–2 (5–4 p)	AS Bapaume-Bertincourt-Vaulx-Vraucourt (11)
67.	ES Angres (11)	1–0	AS Tincquizel (10)
68.	ES Agny (12)	3–11	CSAL Souchez (11)
69.	ASJ Montplaisir (11)	0–1	US Bavay (9)
70.	FC Anor (12)	4–0	SC Bachant (12)
71.	US Cartignies (14)	3–2	AS Dompierre (13)
72.	US Villers-Sire-Nicole (13)	0–3	ES Boussois (10)
73.	US Cousolre (9)	0–0 (5–2 p)	US Jeumont (9)
74.	CA Sainsois (13)	0–3	US Prisches (13)
75.	FC Leval (14)	0–8	ASG Louvroil (9)
76.	AS Bellignies (13)	0–1	AFC Ferrière-la-Petite (11)
77.	SCEPS Pont-sur-Sambre (13)	0–1	US Rousies (10)
78.	AS Étrœungt (13)	0–3	US Villers-Pol (11)
79.	AS Recquignies (11)	0–0 (4–3 p)	IC Ferrière-la-Grande (9)
80.	US Landrecies (14)	6–0	FC Jenlain (14)
81.	Maubeuge Olympique (13)	2–0	AS Douzies (9)
82.	JS Avesnelloise (13)	1–4	OSC Assevent (11)
83.	SC Saint-Remy-du Nord (13)	1–0 (Note: AS Obies penalised for fielding a suspended player.)	AS Obies (14)
84.	AS Trélon (11)	6–1	AFC Colleret (12)
85.	US Beaufort/Limont-Fontaine (11)	0–0 (3–4 p)	AG Solrézienne (10)
86.	Wignehies Olympique (12)	0–4	Olympique Maroilles (10)
87.	US Glageon (13)	0–2	US Gommegnies-Carnoy (11)
88.	AS La Longueville (10)	0–2	Sports Podéens Réunis (9)
89.	US Ohain (14)	0–2	US Berlaimont (9)
90.	US Bousies Forest (14)	2–1	US Sars-Poteries (13)
91.	US Haussy (13)	1–10	US Walincourt-Selvigny (9)
92.	US Bertry-Clary (12)	0–9	OM Cambrai Amérique (9)
93.	US Quievy (10)	1–2	AO Hermies (10)
94.	FC Maretz (14)	0–3	AS Masnières (10)
95.	AS Neuvilly (12)	4–0	US Viesly (13)
96.	FC Cambrai-Saint Roch (12)	0–3	ES Paillencourt-Estrun (10)
97.	US Ors (13)	2–3	US Saint-Souplet (10)
98.	FC Fontaine-au-Bois (12)	2–0	US Rumilly (12)
99.	US Briastre (13)	– (Note: Match abandoned, scoreline unknown. Situation referred to disciplinary committee. Additionally, US Briastre penalised for fielding a suspended player. Both teams removed from the competition.)	US Saint-Aubert (10)
100.	Olympique Saint-Ollois (12)	1–1 (2–4 p)	FC Solesmes (11)
101.	AS Thun-l'Évêque (14)	0–5	FC Neuville-Saint-Rémy (11)
102.	SS Marcoing (12)	1–8	Entente Ligny/Olympique Caullery (9)
103.	OC Avesnois (12)	2–2 (4–3 p)	FC Iwuy (10)
104.	US Les Rues-des-Vignes (12)	1–1 (5–6 p)	US Beauvois Fontaine (12)
105.	US Busigny (15)	0–1	US Fontaine-Notre-Dame (11)
106.	SC Osartis-Marquion (13)	2–0	FC Saulzoir (10)
107.	SC Le Cateau (11)	1–4	FC Provillois (9)
108.	Olympique Flinois (9)	0–0 (6–7 p) (Note: US Err-Hornaing penalised for fielding a suspended player, Olympique Flinois qualify.)	US Erre-Hornaing (9)
109.	FC Bruille-lez-Marchiennes (14)	1–5	FC Roost-Warendin (11)
110.	AS Coutiches (13)	3–3 (3–4 p)	US Corbehem (10)
111.	ESM Hamel (10)	1–0	USAC Somain (10)
112.	AS Douai-Lambres Cheminots (14)	1–6	US Pont Flers (9)
113.	DC Lallaing (12)	3–0	ES Bouvignies (12)
114.	US Aubigny-au-Bac (12)	1–1 (4–5 p)	US Frais Marais (11)
115.	US Aubygeoise (11)	1–1 (2–0 p)	SC Guesnain (9)
116.	Olympique Landasien (12)	1–3	US Esquerchin (13)
117.	UF Anhiers (11)	1–0	US Raimbeaucourt (10)
118.	US Auberchicourt (11)	1–1 (2–4 p)	FC Écaillon (14)
119.	US Pecquencourt (13)	2–2 (3–2 p)	Olympic Marchiennois (12)
120.	FC Féchain (14)	1–3	US Loffre-Erchin (13)
121.	Fenain ES (13)	2–0	FC Fressain-Cantin (12)
122.	Olympique Marquette (13)	2–4 (Note: AS Cuincy penalised for fielding a suspended player, Olympique Marquette qualify.)	AS Cuincy (11)
123.	Olympique Senséen (9)	0–3	AEF Leforest (9)
124.	Dechy Sports (13)	0–3	FC Masny (9)
125.	RC Lécluse (13)	7–0	FC Monchecourt (13)
126.	FC Minier Lewardois (14)	0–8	AS Sin-le-Noble (10)
127.	US Pecquencourt (11)	4–0	AS Courchelettes (12)
128.	US Brillon (15)	0–7	JS Abscon (11)
129.	AS Summer Club Valenciennes (9)	6–0 (Note: Match abandoned after US Lieu-Saint-Amand were reduced below the number of players required to continue. AS Summer Club Valenciennes awarded a 6–0 victory, retaining the number of goals they scored.)	US Lieu-Saint-Amand (13)
130.	Neuville OSC (12)	0–3 (Note: Both teams fielded suspended players, and were removed from the competition.)	Maing FC (9)
131.	EA Prouvy (11)	1–6	FC Quarouble (9)
132.	Olympique Thun (14)	1–5	FC Lecelles-Rosult (10)
133.	AS Artres (12)	0–2	US Quiévrechain (13)
134.	US Verchain-Maugré (13)	5–0	Inter Condé-sur-l'Escaut (14)
135.	SC Vicq (12)	1–1 (3–4 p)	Vieux Condé Foot (10)
136.	FC Hasnon (13)	0–10 (Note: Match abandoned after FC Hasnon were reduced below the number of players required to continue. AS Château-l'Abbaye awarded a 10–0 victory, retaining the number of goals they scored. FC Hasnon further penalised for fielding a suspended player.)	AS Château-l'Abbaye (12)
137.	FC Condé-Macou (13)	0–10	Olympique Onnaingeois (9)
138.	US Haulchin (13)	5–2 (Note: Stade Fresnois penalised for fielding a suspended player.)	Stade Fresnois (10)
139.	AS Petite-Forêt (13)	0–2	USM Marly (9)
140.	ES Noyelles-sur-Selle (12)	0–0 (3–4 p)	ES Bouchain (10)
141.	FC Famars (10)	5–3	SC Lourches (11)
142.	RC Thiant (15)	1–3	USM Beuvrages (10)
143.	AFC Escautpont (10)	1–1 (3–4 p)	US Aulnoy (9)
144.	FC Saultain (11)	0–3 (Note: FC Saultain penalised for fielding a suspended player.)	Saint-Waast CFC (12)
145.	JS Haveluy (12)	0–0 (6–5 p) (Note: JO Wallers-Arenberg penalised for fielding a suspended player.)	JO Wallers-Arenberg (10)
146.	AS Thivencelle (13)	2–1	ES Mastaing Wavrechain (15)
147.	CO Trith-Saint-Léger (10)	3–0	Douchy FC (10)
148.	Anzin FARC (11)	– (Note: Anzin FARC penalised for fielding too many transferred players and fielding a suspended player, Saint-Saulve Football qualify. Original scoreline unknown.)	Saint-Saulve Football (9)
149.	RC Rœulx (12)	7–2	AS Wavrechain-sous-Denain (13)
150.	FC Haspres (13)	0–1	ES Sebourg-Estreux (13)
151.	Fort-Mardyck OC (10)	4–0	US Hondeghem (11)
152.	Faches-Thumesnil FC (10)	3–0	ES Weppes (10)
153.	JS Steenwerck (10)	– (Note: JS Steenwerck penalised for fielding a suspended player, USF Coudekerque qualify. Original scoreline unknown.)	USF Coudekerque (10)
154.	FC Bauvin (10)	3–3 (5–3 p)	US Pérenchies (9)
155.	Stade Lezennois (10)	3–0	FC Colmar Armentières (13)
156.	CO Quaëdypre (12)	1–4	ES Boeschepe (10)
157.	FC Le Doulieu (10)	0–2	SC Bourbourg (9)
158.	SR Lomme Délivrance (10)	2–1	FC Wambrechies (10)
159.	FC Bierne (12)	0–5	AS Bersée (10)
160.	FC La Chapelle-d'Armentières (9)	4–1 (Note: Football Saint-Michel Quesnoy penalised for fielding a suspended player.)	Football Saint-Michel Quesnoy (10)
161.	US Houplin-Ancoisne (11)	1–3	Lille AFS Guinée (12)
162.	ACS Comines (10)	0–5	OSM Sequedin (9)
163.	AS Radinghem (10)	1–3	SC Bailleulois (8)
164.	RC Herzeele (11)	0–1	ASC Roubaix (10)
165.	AF Deux-Synthe (12)	0–7	FC Rosendaël (10)
166.	FC Wahagnies (13)	1–6	UJS Cheminots de Tourcoing (12)
167.	AS Usines Dunkerque (13)	1–4	CS Gondecourt (11)
168.	US Ronchin (9)	4–3	US Yser (10)
169.	OSM Lomme (11)	0–7	FA Blanc Seau (11)
170.	Entente Mouchin Bachy (13)	1–2	FC Wattignies (11)
171.	AS Pitgam (11)	1–3	Olympique Mérignies (12)
172.	AS Jean Baptiste Roubaix (12)	2–3	US Antillais Lille Métropole (13)
173.	OJC Foot Saint-Jans-Cappel (13)	3–0	RC Bois-Blancs Lille (12)
174.	JS Lille Wazemmes (9)	2–6	OS Fives (8)
175.	AS Eecke (13)	1–3	AS Loos Oliveaux (9)
176.	JA Armentières (9)	3–2	FC Lille Sud (9)
177.	FC Steene (11)	4–1	AS Rexpoëde (11)
178.	AG Thumeries (11)	1–4	ES Mouvalloise (9)
179.	US Wallon-Cappel (12)	0–1	CG Haubourdin (9)
180.	US Phalempin (11)	0–0 (5–6 p)	FC Linselles (9)
181.	JS Ghyveldoise (10)	1–6	SM Petite-Synthe (10)
182.	AS Pont de Nieppe (11)	0–3	FC Seclin (8)
183.	Sailly Forest Foot (11)	3–4	ASC Hazebrouck (8)
184.	ES Ennequin-Loos (10)	1–3	Leers OF (8)
185.	US Fleurbaix (14)	4–2	Hondschoote FC (12)
186.	FC Annœullin (9)	1–1 (1–4 p)	US Téteghem (9)
187.	FC Vieux-Berquin (11)	1–1 (4–5 p)	ES Genech (9)
188.	CS EIC Tourcoing (12)	3–0	ASF Coudekerque (10)
189.	Wattrelos FC (10)	0–2	USCC Saint-Pol-sur-Mer (9)
190.	US Bray-Dunes (11)	0–5	Prémesques FC (11)
191.	ACS Hoymille (12)	0–1	EAC Cysoing-Wannehain-Bourghelles (9)
192.	EC Camphin-en-Pévèle (11)	2–1	EC Anstaing-Chéreng-Tressin-Gruson (8)
193.	Olympic Hallennois (11)	4–0	ASF Looberghe-Holque-Cappelle Brouck de la Colme (11)
194.	USF Armbouts-Cappel (10)	0–7	RC Bergues (8)
195.	JS Wavrin-Don (9)	3–2 (Note: JS Wavrin-Don penalised for fielding a suspended player, Verlinghem Foot qualify.)	Verlinghem Foot (9)
196.	US Attiches (12)	1–2	FC Templemars-Vendeville (10)
197.	US Warhem (10)	2–2 (3–4 p)	Olympique Hémois FC (9)
198.	AS Winnezeele (12)	1–3	ES Lille Louvière Pellevoisin (10)
199.	US Leffrinckoucke (9)	4–1	US Fretin (9)
200.	FC Nieppois (11)	1–1 (4–3 p)	AS Templeuve-en-Pévèle (9)
201.	ES Cappelloise (11)	6–1	US Estaires (11)
202.	ES Wormhout (12)	1–4	US Lille Moulins Carrel (8)
203.	Toufflers AF (10)	0–6	AO Sainghinoise (8)
204.	US Maritime (12)	2–2 (4–5 p)	AAJ Uxem (11)
205.	AS Albeck Grande-Synthe (10)	5–1	SC Grand Fort Philippe (11)
206.	FC Mons-en-Barœul (11)	1–4	EC Houplines (9)
207.	US Wervicquoise (12)	0–10	Flers OS Villeneuve d'Ascq (9)
208.	FC Méteren (11)	1–4	USM Merville (10)
209.	OC Roubaisien (8)	6–0	AS Marcq (14)
210.	FC Saint-Folquin (12)	0–3	US Lederzeele (12)
211.	Stella Lys (9)	2–0	CS Bousbecque (10)
212.	SCO Roubaix (9)	2–2 (2–4 p)	Union Halluinoise (9)
213.	US Godewaersvelde (11)	1–1 (3–4 p)	Bac-Sailly Sports (11)
214.	US Landrethun-le-Nord (9)	1–5	JS Desvroise (9)
215.	USM Boulogne-sur-Mer (13)	0–4	ASEP Saint-Inglevert (13)
216.	AS Saint-Tricat et Nielles (13)	0–5	AS Wimereux (9)
217.	US Hardinghen (12)	0–8	RC Samer (11)
218.	AS Andres (13)	0–2	ES Saint-Léonard (9)
219.	FJEP Guemps (15)	0–8	Éclair Neufchâtel-Hardelot (10)
220.	RC Lottinghem (14)	2–4	FC Fréthun (12)
221.	ES Oye-Plage (10)	2–2 (4–3 p)	RC Ardrésien (10)
222.	FC Wissant (13)	0–3	AS Audruicq (9)
223.	Le Portel GPF (13)	0–4	AS Surques-Escœuilles (10)
224.	FC Offekerque (14)	4–3	AC Verte Vallée (14)
225.	FC Landrethun-lez-Ardres (14)	0–3 (Note: ESL Boulogne-sur-Mer penalised for fielding a suspended player, FC Landrethun-lez-Ardres qualify.)	ESL Boulogne-sur-Mer (10)
226.	US Elinghen-Ferques (12)	1–3	FLC Longfossé (9)
227.	RC Brêmes-les-Ardres (13)	1–4	FC Conti (13)
228.	ASL Vieil-Moutier La Calique (12)	0–1	US Marquise (10)
229.	Amicale Balzac (13)	1–9	FC Campagne-lès-Guines (9)
230.	FC Isques (12)	1–3	FC Capellois (10)
231.	AS Balinghem (13)	2–0	CAP Le Portel (11)
232.	US Équihen-Plage (11)	3–1	CO Wimille (10)
233.	US Hesdin-l'Abbé (12)	1–0	ES Guînes (10)
234.	FC Les Attaques (14)	1–1 (5–4 p)	JS Condette (10)
235.	US Marais de Gûines (10)	1–2	FJEP Fort Vert (9)
236.	FC Bonningues-lès-Calais (14)	0–1	AS Nortkerque 95 (9)
237.	US Porteloise (13)	7–1	CA Vieille Église (13)
238.	FC Sangatte (11)	2–0	SO Calais (11)
239.	US Ambleteuse (10)	1–1 (3–4 p)	RC Bréquerecque Ostrohove (11)
240.	FC Calais Caténa (10)	– (Note: US Dannes failed to attend the match at the scheduled kickoff time. FC Calais Caténa subsequently penalised for including a suspended player on the team sheet. Both teams removed from the competition.)	US Dannes (10)
241.	US Conteville Wierre-Effroy (12)	1–5	Entente Calais (9)
242.	JS Bonningues-lès-Ardres (13)	0–2	Amicale Pont-de-Briques (10)
243.	AS Berck (9)	2–0	ES Roquetoire (10)
244.	AS Campagne-lès-Hesdin (10)	0–2	FCP Blendecques (10)
245.	Nieurlet SL (14)	2–7	Gouy-Saint-André RC (10)
246.	CS Watten (10)	2–1	FC Saint-Martin-lez-Tatinghem (10)
247.	Asoociation Quartier Genty Berck (14)	0–3	AC Tubersent (14)
248.	AS Cucq (9)	1–2	FC Recques-sur-Hem (9)
249.	JS Morinie (15)	1–6	Verton FC (10)
250.	Union Saint-Loupoise (11)	0–5	US Verchocq-Ergny-Herly (10)
251.	FC Hucqueliers (14)	1–7	JS Renescuroise (11)
252.	AS Tournehem (11)	1–5	AS Conchil-le-Temple (9)
253.	Longuenesse Malafoot (12)	0–2	CA Éperlecques (9)
254.	Entente Steenbecque Morbecque (14)	0–0 (2–0 p)	ES Boisdinghem-Zudausques-Mentque-Nortbécourt (14)
255.	US Polincove (13)	0–3	FC Setques (13)
256.	US Vallée du Bras de Brosne (14)	1–8	AF Étaples Haute Ville (9)
257.	FC Wailly Beaucamp (12)	0–3	ES Helfaut (11)
258.	FC Wardrecques (11)	1–1 (3–4 p) (Note: US Bourthes penalised for fielding a suspended player, FC Wardrecques qualify.)	US Bourthes (9)
259.	FC Wavrans-sur-l'Aa (12)	2–0	FC Merlimont (10)
260.	AS Bezinghem (10)	3–0	US Alquines (11)
261.	US Thérouanne (12)	1–3	US Quiestède (10)
262.	FC Thiembronne (14)	1–3	AS Fruges (11)
263.	US Coyecques (13)	0–5	AS Rang-du-Fliers (10)
264.	US Bomy (14)	2–3	AS Esquerdes (11)
265.	FC Senlecques (13)	0–5	US Nielles-lès-Bléquin (9)
266.	US Créquy-Fressin (11)	1–1 (4–2 p)	US Frencq (12)
267.	FC Ecques-Heuringhem (13)	1–2	ES Mametz (11)
268.	Lys Aa FC (10)	1–0	FC Nordausques (11)
269.	ES Herbelles-Pihem-Inghem (12)	2–5	US Saint-Quentin-Bléssy (9)
270.	US Brimeux (13)	0–4	ES Enquin-les-Mines (9)
271.	AL Camiers (12)	0–14	Olympique Hesdin-Marconne (9)
272.	CS Montescourt-Lizerolles (12)	0–7	US Seboncourt (9)
273.	CS Aubenton (12)	2–2 (4–2 p)	Le Nouvion AC (10)
274.	US Villers-Cotterêts (12)	0–5	US des Vallées (9)
275.	FC Amigny-Rouy (13)	2–6	ALJN Sinceny (12)
276.	US Rozoy-sur-Serre (12)	0–3	US Guignicourt (9)
277.	Étaves-et-Bocquiaux FC (12)	0–3	Harly Quentin (9)
278.	CS Blérancourt (12)	0–0 (8–7 p)	FC Moncelien (10)
279.	La Ferté Chevresis FC (11)	2–1	AS Tupigny (12)
280.	UA Fère-en-Tardenois (11)	1–2	FC Courmelles (11)
281.	Fraternelle des Cheminots de Laon (13)	1–3	L'Arsenal Club Achery-Beautor-Charmes (11)
282.	ACSF Vic-sur-Aisne (12)	1–10	ASA Presles (10)
283.	US Acy (12)	2–2 (4–5 p)	Union Sud Aisne FC (10)
284.	Gauchy-Grugies Saint-Quentin FC (9)	4–1	Marle Sports (10)
285.	Espoir Sains-Richaumont (12)	4–2	ES Bucilly-Landouzy-Éparcy (12)
286.	FC Watigny (12)	1–1 (2–3 p)	US Étreaupont (12)
287.	US Guise (9)	2–1	ESUS Buironfosse-La Capelle (9)
288.	AS Pavant (12)	0–0 (9–8 p)	RC Condé (13)
289.	US Origny-Thenelles (12)	0–7	FC Lesdins (10)
290.	Dizy-le-Gros FC (13)	0–7	ASC Saint-Michel (10)
291.	Coveronnais SC (12)	0–1	FFC Chéry-lès-Pouilly (10)
292.	US Vadencourt (11)	0–3	SC Origny-en-Thiérache (9)
293.	Chambry FC (12)	0–5	Entente Crouy-Cuffies (10)
294.	FC Billy-sur-Aisne (12)	0–2	ES Viry-Noureuil (11)
295.	ADP Soissons (13)	0–8	FC Vierzy (10)
296.	FC Saint-Martin Étreillers (11)	0–2	ES Ognes (10)
297.	SC Flavy (13)	0–3	FC Essigny-le-Grand (10)
298.	FC Vaux-Andigny (13)	1–4	US Vervins (9)
299.	FC Frières-Faillouël (13)	0–1	FC Abbecourt (11)
300.	Tergnier FC (9)	3–0	FC Fresnoy Fonsomme (9)
301.	AS Milonaise (11)	0–1	IEC Château-Thierry (9)
302.	Gouy FC (13)	2–2 (2–4 p)	US Brissy-Hamégicourt (12)
303.	US Vallée de l'Ailette (12)	5–2	AS Nouvionnaise (12)
304.	CSO Athies (11)	– (Note: CSO Athies penalised for fielding an ineligible player, La Concorde de Bucy-les-Pierrepont qualify. Original scoreline unknown.)	La Concorde de Bucy-les-Pierrepont (11)
305.	UES Vermand (10)	0–3	AS Beaurevoir (10)
306.	AS Neuilly-Saint-Front (10)	5–0	FC Bucy-le-Long (11)
307.	CA Saint-Simon (13)	0–1	US Crépy Vivaise (10)
308.	ASPTT Laon (10)	1–1 (3–5 p)	US Chemin des Dames (10)
309.	Olympique Gricourt (12)	3–2	FC Hannapes (10)
310.	AS Faverolles Dampleux Fleury (11)	2–1	FJEP Coincy (11)
311.	US Anizy Pinon (12)	1–0	AS Barenton-Bugny (12)
312.	FC Lehaucourt (11)	1–0	NES Boué-Étreux (11)
313.	US La Fère (11)	2–2 (3–5 p)	US Bruyères-et-Montbérault (9)
314.	FC Salency (13)	1–3	AS Beaulieu Écuvilly (13)
315.	FC Sacy-Saint Martin (11)	3–1	US Crépy-en-Valois (9)
316.	FC Boran (11)	1–1 (5–6 p)	ÉC Villers/Bailleul (11)
317.	SCC Sérifontaine (10)	0–1	USE Saint-Leu d'Esserent (9)
318.	US Baugy Monchy Humières (10)	0–1	US Estrées-Saint-Denis (9)
319.	US Verberie (10)	1–3	ES Ormoy-Duvy (9)
320.	AF Trie-Château (12)	2–3	AS Ons-en-Bray (10)
321.	FC Coudray (13)	0–3	SC Songeons (9)
322.	US Pont-l'Évêque Oise (13)	0–4	ES Remy (10)
323.	AS Maignelay-Montigny (11)	3–0	ES Compiègne (11)
324.	AS Saint-Remy-en-l'Eau (12)	0–1	US Marseille-en-Beauvaisis (11)
325.	AS Saint-Samson-la-Poterie (13)	0–3	FC Fontainettes Saint-Aubin (10)
326.	JS Guiscard (11)	2–2 (3–1 p)	CA Venette (9)
327.	Rollot AC (11)	0–5	Dynamo Canly Lonueil (9)
328.	AS Cheminots Chambly (13)	1–2	US Bresloise (9)
329.	AS Verderel-lès-Sauqueuse (11)	5–3	AS Hénonville (11)
330.	SC Lamotte Breuil (10)	1–6 (Note: Original match on 28 August 2022 finished 1–1 (5–4 p), but was ordered to be replayed on 4 September 2022 after a refereeing error in not allowing the SC Lamotte Breuil goalkeeper to play.)	FC Ruraville (11)
331.	US Attichy (13)	0–6	JSA Compiègne-La Croix-Saint Ouen (10)
332.	ES Formerie (11)	3–2	FC Cempuis (12)
333.	CSM Mesnil-en-Thelle (13)	2–0	FR Les Ageux (10)
334.	Stade Ressontois (10)	0–2	FCJ Noyon (10)
335.	Tricot OS (10)	1–0	AS Silly-le-Long (10)
336.	AS Auneuil (10)	3–0	US Andeville (10)
337.	FC Jouy-sous-Thelle (13)	1–2	US Étouy-Agnetz-Bulles (9)
338.	AS Saint-Sauveur (Oise) (9)	2–0	FC Clairoix (10)
339.	FC Lavilletertre (13)	3–0	FC Cauffry (10)
340.	AS Laigneville (12)	0–9	AS Coye-la-Forêt (10)
341.	FC Carlepont (11)	0–6	US Plessis-Brion (9)
342.	FC Nointel (11)	0–2	US Lieuvillers (10)
343.	FC Talmontiers (13)	1–2	FC Saint-Paul (11)
344.	AS Bornel (11)	1–0	RC Creil Agglo (12)
345.	US Sainte-Geneviève (10)	0–3	USR Saint-Crépin-Ibouvillers (10)
346.	AS Noyers-Saint-Martin (11)	2–2 (2–5 p)	US Breuil-le-Sec (10)
347.	US Saint-Germer-de-Fly (12)	1–0	AS Monchy-Saint-Éloi (12)
348.	AS La Neuville-en-Hez (12)	0–3	US Lamorlaye (9)
349.	US Froissy (11)	0–3	US Ribécourt (9)
350.	US Lassigny (9)	2–0	FC Golancourt (12)
351.	AS Brunvillers-la-Motte (12)	1–4	AS Multien (9)
352.	CS Haudivillers (11)	2–1	AS Verneuil-en-Halatte (9)
353.	AS Orry-La-Chapelle (10)	0–3	AS Allonne (9)
354.	EFC Dieudonné Puiseux (10)	0–1	FC Saint-Just des Marais (11)
355.	FC Bellovaques (12)	1–1 (1–3 p)	AS Plailly (10)
356.	ESC Wavignies (11)	1–2	AJ Laboissière-en-Thelle (9)
357.	US Mouy (11)	0–2	Hermes-Berthecourt AC (9)
358.	US Gaudechart (12)	1–7	US Cires-lès-Mello (9)
359.	FC Angy (10)	2–2 (3–1 p)	US ASPTT Portugais Beauvais (9)
360.	SC Les Marettes (12)	0–3	FC Esches Fosseuse (12)
361.	AS Noailles-Cauvigny (10)	1–2	CS Avilly-Saint-Léonard (9)
362.	RC Blargies (12)	0–2	US Crèvecœur-le-Grand (10)
363.	US Paillart (11)	0–2	AS La Neuville-sur-Oudeuil (10)
364.	ES Sainte-Emilie/Épehy-le-Ronss (11)	0–0 (4–1 p)	US Daours Vecquemont Bussy Aubigny (10)
365.	US Marcelcave (12)	3–4	ABC2F Candas (10)
366.	Fienvillers FC (14)	5–2	Rumigny FC (13)
367.	Boves SC (12)	5–3	FC Blangy-Tronville (10)
368.	ASFR Ribemont Mericourt (11)	0–9	RC Salouël Saleux (10)
369.	AS Rethonvillers Biarre Marché (13)	0–6	US Corbie (10)
370.	AS Namps-Maisnil (12)	1–3	USC Moislains (12)
371.	FC Estrées-Mons (11)	0–10	AS Glisy (9)
372.	ES Licourt (13)	4–0	ASM Rivery (12)
373.	ES Sains/Saint-Fuscien (11)	4–0	Fraternelle Ailly-sur-Noye (10)
374.	US Voyennes (12)	2–7	US Marchélepot (11)
375.	FC Plessier (12)	0–4	AAE Chaulnes (9)
376.	US Roisel (12)	0–4	FC Méaulte (10)
377.	AS Domart-sur-la-Luce (12)	2–1	Amiens Picardie FC (12)
378.	AS Saint-Sauveur 80 (10)	1–1 (4–5 p)	US Ouvriere Albert (9)
379.	CS Amiens Montières Étouvie (10)	– (Note: CS Amiens Montières Étouvie penalised for fielding too many transferred players, US Sailly-Saillisel qualify. Original scoreline unknown.)	US Sailly-Saillisel (10)
380.	SC Fouilloy (14)	2–1	ASL Saveuse (13)
381.	RC 2 Ercheu (14)	0–10	AS Villers-Bretonneux (9)
382.	ASF Hombleux (13)	0–4	US Ham (10)
383.	US Esmery-Hallon (13)	0–3	ES Roye-Damery (11)
384.	AS Prouzel-Plachy (12)	1–6	ES Cagny (11)
385.	FC Vignacourt (13)	0–3	Amiens RIF (9)
386.	US Méricourt l'Abbé (12)	0–9	Poix-Blangy-Croixrault FC (10)
387.	US Cartigny-Buire (12)	2–7	AS Querrieu (10)
388.	Olympique Monchy-Lagache (12)	0–5	FR Englebelmer (10)
389.	AS Talmas Picardie Fienvillers (12)	0–11	Olympique Le Hamel (9)
390.	US Beauquesne (13)	1–0 (Note: US Beauquesne penalised for fielding seven ineligible players, AS Cerisy qualify.)	AS Cerisy (11)
391.	AS Picquigny (13)	3–0	SEP Blangy-Bouttencourt (11)
392.	US Neuilly-l'Hôpital (11)	1–0	AS Airaines-Allery (9)
393.	Avenir Nouvion-en-Ponthieu (10)	4–0	JS Cambron (10)
394.	ES Vers-sur-Selle (13)	1–1 (1–4 p)	FR Millencourt-en-Ponthieu (12)
395.	US Le Boisle (13)	3–2	US Vron (13)
396.	AAE Feuquières-en-Vimeu (14)	3–1	FC Rue-Le Crotoy (11)
397.	SC Bernaville-Prouville (12)	0–4	US Friville-Escarbotin (9)
398.	Olympique Eaucourtois (12)	3–0	Mers AC (11)
399.	AS Menchecourt-Thuison-La Bouvaque (11)	1–3	FC Centuloise (9)
400.	US Quend (11)	2–3	CS Crécy-en-Ponthieu (10)
401.	AS Maisnières (13)	2–2 (2–3 p)	US Bouillancourt-en-Sery (12)
402.	AS La Chaussée-Tirancourt (14)	0–3	AS Woincourt Dargnies (13)
403.	Entente Sailly-Flibeaucourt Le Titre (12)	1–4	US Lignières-Châtelain (10)
404.	FC Oisemont (10)	2–1	RC Doullens (9)
405.	AS Long (13)	0–0 (2–5 p)	Football Dreuillois (11)
406.	ES Chépy (11)	3–1	US Béthencourt-sur-Mer (10)
407.	AS Hautvillers-Ouville (14)	0–3	US Flesselles (10)
408.	Avenir de l'Étoile (12)	0–1	SC Templiers Oisemont (9)
409.	AS Quesnoy-le-Montant (13)	4–1	CO Woignarue (11)
410.	Olympique Mollienois (12)	2–1	AS Vismes au Val (11)
411.	ES Harondel (11)	0–2	SC Pont-Remy (10)
412.	AS Arrest (13)	0–1	FC Mareuil-Caubert (10)
413.	AC Hallencourt (11)	0–1	Olympique Amiénois (10)
414.	ASIC Bouttencourt (10)	1–3	SC Flixecourt (9)

=== Second round ===
These matches were played on 3, 4 and 11 September 2022.

Second round results: Hauts-de-France
Tie no	Home team (tier)	Score	Away team (tier)
1.	US Noyelles-sous-Lens (8)	0–0 (2–4 p)	Stade Béthunois (6)
2.	OS Annequin (9)	1–1 (4–1 p) (Note: OS Annequin penalised for fielding a suspended player. Arras FA qualify.)	Arras FA (6)
3.	ES Labeuvrière (8)	0–5	ES Bully-les-Mines (6)
4.	USO Lens (9)	0–1	OS Aire-sur-la-Lys (6)
5.	US Biachoise (6)	4–2	SC Pro Patria Wingles (8)
6.	ES Anzin-Saint-Aubin (8)	1–1 (4–5 p)	CS Avion (7)
7.	ESD Isbergues (9)	2–2 (3–4 p)	Calonne-Ricouart FC Cite 6 (7)
8.	USO Meurchin (9)	0–4	US Nœux-les-Mines (7)
9.	US Annezin (10)	2–0	SC Saint-Nicolas-lez-Arras (7)
10.	FC Lillers (10)	2–2 (1–3 p)	US Saint-Maurice Loos-en-Gohelle (7)
11.	US Grenay (10)	0–11	US Saint-Pol-sur-Ternoise (7)
12.	FC Montigny-en-Gohelle (9)	0–2	Carabiniers Billy-Montigny (7)
13.	CS Diana Liévin (8)	0–1	RC Labourse (9)
14.	USA Liévin (9)	0–5	US Vermelles (8)
15.	La Couture FC (10)	1–1 (1–3 p)	JS Écourt-Saint-Quentin (8)
16.	AS Brebières (10)	3–0	AFCL Liebaut (8)
17.	US Hesdigneul (11)	1–3	USO Bruay-la-Buissière (8)
18.	ES Vendin (11)	2–2 (1–4 p)	COS Marles-Lozinghem (8)
19.	Olympique Liévin (11)	0–7	AS Sainte-Barbe-Oignies (8)
20.	FC Hersin (11)	1–2	FC Annay (11)
21.	Olympique Arras (11)	7–2	AAE Évin-Malmaison (11)
22.	ES Saint-Laurent-Blangy (9)	4–1	JF Guarbecque (10)
23.	ES Sainte-Catherine (9)	1–2	ES Haisnes (10)
24.	Olympique Héninois (11)	2–1	US Billy-Berclau (9)
25.	US Cheminots Avion (11)	1–9	Espérance Calonne Liévin (9)
26.	AS Vallée de la Ternoise (12)	1–1 (3–4 p)	SC Artésien (9)
27.	OC Cojeul (12)	2–3	US Rouvroy (9)
28.	AS Lensoise (10)	1–1 (3–5 p)	US Beuvry (11)
29.	AAE Aix-Noulette (11)	0–0 (4–3 p)	US Pas-en-Artois (10)
30.	US Ruch Carvin (11)	5–1	JF Mazingarbe (12)
31.	FC La Roupie-Isbergues (12)	2–1	UC Divion (11)
32.	USC Monchy-Breton (13)	0–3	CSAL Souchez (11)
33.	FC Verquigneul (13)	2–4	CS Habarcq (11)
34.	SC Fouquières (12)	2–1	ES Angres (11)
35.	FC Méricourt (14)	2–4	FC Hinges (11)
36.	US Boubers-Conchy (12)	1–1 (0–3 p)	AS Cauchy-à-la-Tour (13)
37.	AOSC Sallaumines (13)	4–0	US Ablain (12)
38.	ES Allouagne (12)	8–0	JS Bourecquoise (14)
39.	AEP Verdrel (14)	0–3	Atrébate FC (12)
40.	ES Val Sensée (12)	1–1 (4–2 p)	AFC Libercourtois (14)
41.	AJ Ruitz (12)	1–3	FC Busnes (13)
42.	ASPTT Arras (13)	2–4	Olympique Vendin (12)
43.	AS Neuvireuil-Gavrelle (13)	5–2	FC Estevelles (14)
44.	ES Ficheux (14)	6–0	FC Givenchy-en-Gohelle (13)
45.	AS Kennedy Hénin-Beaumont (15)	4–3	FC Richebourg (13)
46.	FCE La Bassée (15)	2–1	US Ham-en-Artois (14)
47.	RC Calonne-Ricouart (15)	3–2	AS Pont-à-Vendin (15)
48.	AS Salomé (12)	0–1	ES Douvrin (12)
49.	Sports Podéens Réunis (9)	1–7	US Fourmies (7)
50.	SC Saint-Remy-du Nord (13)	2–4	US Gommegnies-Carnoy (11)
51.	AS Hautmont (7)	4–1	US Bavay (9)
52.	US Berlaimont (9)	1–3 (Note: SA Le Quesnoy penalised for fielding a suspended player. US Berlaimont qualify.)	SA Le Quesnoy (8)
53.	US Bousies Forest (14)	0–3	Olympique Maroilles (10)
54.	US Villers-Pol (11)	3–3 (7–8 p)	FC Avesnes-sur-Helpe (8)
55.	US Prisches (13)	1–3	US Cousolre (9)
56.	US Cartignies (14)	0–5	AFC Ferrière-la-Petite (11)
57.	Maubeuge Olympique (13)	2–4	ASG Louvroil (9)
58.	FC Anor (12)	0–1	AS Trélon (11)
59.	AG Solrézienne (10)	1–0	AS Recquignies (11)
60.	US Landrecies (14)	0–4	ES Boussois (10)
61.	OSC Assevent (11)	0–3	US Rousies (10)
62.	US Saint-Souplet (10)	2–3	AS Masnières (10)
63.	FC Provillois (9)	0–0 (3–4 p)	ES Villers-Outréaux (8)
64.	FC Fontaine-au-Bois (12)	1–3	ES Caudry (9)
65.	FC Neuville-Saint-Rémy (11)	0–1	US Walincourt-Selvigny (9)
66.	AS Neuvilly (12)	– (Note: Tie won by walkover due to the opposing team being excluded from the competition after the draw was made.)	walkover
67.	US Beauvois Fontaine (12)	2–4	AO Hermies (10)
68.	SC Osartis-Marquion (13)	1–3	OM Cambrai Amérique (9)
69.	FC Solesmes (11)	0–3	OC Avesnois (12)
70.	Entente Ligny/Olympique Caullery (9)	3–2	ES Paillencourt-Estrun (10)
71.	US Fontaine-Notre-Dame (11)	0–2	CAS Escaudœuvres (7)
72.	AS Sin-le-Noble (10)	1–3	ESM Hamel (10)
73.	FC Roost-Warendin (11)	0–4	FC Les Epis (8)
74.	FC Masny (9)	4–2	SC Aniche (8)
75.	FC Pecquencourt (13)	0–5	UF Anhiers (11)
76.	DC Lallaing (12)	0–2	AS Beuvry-la-Forêt (8)
77.	AEF Leforest (9)	3–1	SC Douai (8)
78.	Olympique Marquette (13)	1–1 (3–4 p)	US Corbehem (10)
79.	US Loffre-Erchin (13)	– (Note: Match abandoned after 85 minutes when US Loffre-Erchin left the field. US Loffre-Erchin penalised, Fenain ES qualify.)	Fenain ES (13)
80.	US Aubygeoise (11)	2–4	US Pont Flers (9)
81.	US Esquerchin (13)	1–5	US Frais Marais (11)
82.	RC Lécluse (13)	0–0 (2–4 p)	Stade Orchésien (8)
83.	US Pecquencourt (11)	3–4	Olympique Flinois (9)
84.	FC Écaillon (14)	4–4 (3–1 p)	FC Férin (9)
85.	AS Thivencelle (13)	– (Note: match abandoned in the 84th minute. Both sides removed from the competition.)	JS Haveluy (12)
86.	US Aulnoy (9)	–	walkover
87.	US Haulchin (13)	1–6	USM Marly (9)
88.	JS Abscon (11)	3–2	FC Famars (10)
89.	Saint-Waast CFC (12)	1–5	ES Sebourg-Estreux (13)
90.	ES Bouchain (10)	1–2	FC Quarouble (9)
91.	US Verchain-Maugré (13)	0–4	US Hordain (8)
92.	Olympique Onnaingeois (9)	3–2	AS Summer Club Valenciennes (9)
93.	RC Rœulx (12)	6–2	USM Beuvrages (10)
94.	CO Trith-Saint-Léger (10)	0–4	FC Dutemple (7)
95.	US Quiévrechain (13)	1–14	FC Raismes (7)
96.	Saint-Saulve Football (9)	3–2	IC La Sentinelle (7)
97.	AS Château-l'Abbaye (12)	0–2	Vieux Condé Foot (10)
98.	FC Lecelles-Rosult (10)	3–2	Bruay Sports (8)
99.	AAJ Uxem (11)	0–0 (3–4 p)	Flers OS Villeneuve d'Ascq (9)
100.	Bac-Sailly Sports (11)	1–3	FC La Chapelle-d'Armentières (9)
101.	Faches-Thumesnil FC (10)	1–2	FC Madeleinois (7)
102.	ASC Roubaix (10)	2–4	AS Loos Oliveaux (9)
103.	US Lederzeele (12)	1–10	FC Linselles (9)
104.	JA Armentières (9)	3–2	FC Dunkerque-Malo Plage (7)
105.	FA Neuvilloise (7)	0–3	US Pays de Cassel (6)
106.	CS Gondecourt (11)	1–2	Mons AC (8)
107.	ES Cappelloise (11)	0–3	FC Loon-Plage (6)
108.	Prémesques FC (11)	0–5	US Portugais Roubaix Tourcoing (7)
109.	US Leffrinckoucke (9)	3–4	US Provin (7)
110.	USM Merville (10)	5–1	FC Nieppois (11)
111.	ES Genech (9)	0–1	SR Lomme Délivrance (10)
112.	AS Bersée (10)	2–3	RC Bergues (8)
113.	Olympic Hallennois (11)	0–6	US Saint-André (6)
114.	Olympique Hémois FC (9)	3–1	ES Lille Louvière Pellevoisin (10)
115.	EAC Cysoing-Wannehain-Bourghelles (9)	1–2	US Lille Moulins Carrel (8)
116.	SC Bailleulois (8)	2–1	CS La Gorgue (8)
117.	OC Roubaisien (8)	0–1	AS Dunkerque Sud (7)
118.	US Fleurbaix (14)	2–2 (4–2 p)	Lille AFS Guinée (12)
119.	EC Camphin-en-Pévèle (11)	0–0 (3–4 p)	US Ronchin (9)
120.	FC Wattignies (11)	1–1 (5–4 p)	Stade Lezennois (10)
121.	US Téteghem (9)	0–0 (4–2 p)	US Ascq (7)
122.	CS EIC Tourcoing (12)	– (Note: Match abandoned in the 68th minute. CS EIC Tourcoing penalised, USF Coudekerque qualify.)	USF Coudekerque (10)
123.	ES Mouvalloise (9)	0–5	Bondues FC (7)
124.	Olympique Grande-Synthe (6)	4–0	AS Hellemmes (7)
125.	OJC Foot Saint-Jans-Cappel (13)	0–9	US Esquelbecq (7)
126.	OSM Sequedin (9)	3–0	AO Sainghinoise (8)
127.	RC Roubaix (8)	1–1 (3–4 p)	US Tourcoing FC (6)
128.	Leers OF (8)	2–0	Stella Lys (9)
129.	CG Haubourdin (9)	– (Note: Tie won by walkover after Villeneuve-d'Ascq Métropole were removed from the competition.)	walkover
130.	EC Houplines (9)	1–2	US Lesquin (6)
131.	SM Petite-Synthe (10)	1–1 (4–3 p)	US Wattrelos (8)
132.	UJS Cheminots de Tourcoing (12)	0–6	OS Fives (8)
133.	FC Rosendaël (10)	0–7	FC Seclin (8)
134.	FC Templemars-Vendeville (10)	3–0	ES Roncq (8)
135.	USCC Saint-Pol-sur-Mer (9)	0–1	Union Halluinoise (9)
136.	US Marquette (8)	0–3	AS Steenvorde (6)
137.	FC Steene (11)	2–3	AS Albeck Grande-Synthe (10)
138.	Olympique Mérignies (12)	2–3	Fort-Mardyck OC (10)
139.	ES Boeschepe (10)	2–3	FA Blanc Seau (11)
140.	SC Bourbourg (9)	4–1	UF Lambersart (7)
141.	US Antillais Lille Métropole (13)	0–9	SC Hazebrouck (6)
142.	FC Santes (8)	1–5	US Gravelines (6)
143.	Verlinghem Foot (9)	5–1	AS Baisieux Patro (8)
144.	FC Bauvin (10)	0–1	ASC Hazebrouck (8)
145.	FC Setques (13)	0–10	Stade Portelois (6)
146.	FC Fréthun (12)	0–9	US Saint-Omer (6)
147.	FC Campagne-lès-Guines (9)	1–1 (5–4 p)	AS Marck (6)
148.	AS Outreau (7)	0–0 (1–4 p)	Grand Calais Pascal FC (6)
149.	FC Capellois (10)	0–0 (3–5 p)	AS Étaples (6)
150.	FLC Longfossé (9)	0–7	Olympique Lumbrois (6)
151.	US Marquise (10)	0–0 (5–6 p)	Le Touquet AC (6)
152.	AS Colembert (12)	0–3	Lys Aa FC (10)
153.	US Hesdin-l'Abbé (12)	0–1	AS Crémarest (12)
154.	ES Mametz (11)	3–10	JS Desvroise (9)
155.	US Saint-Quentin-Bléssy (9)	1–4	FC Recques-sur-Hem (9)
156.	US Quiestède (10)	1–2	RC Samer (11)
157.	AS Balinghem (13)	0–10	Éclair Neufchâtel-Hardelot (10)
158.	AS Fruges (11)	2–4	ES Saint-Léonard (9)
159.	ES Helfaut (11)	0–4	FC Wardrecques (11)
160.	CS Watten (10)	2–4	US Blaringhem (8)
161.	JS Renescuroise (11)	1–4	Olympique Hesdin-Marconne (9)
162.	FC Conti (13)	2–5	AS Berck (9)
163.	JS Racquinghem (12)	0–0 (5–4 p)	Calais FCHF (9)
164.	Gouy-Saint-André RC (10)	2–1	ES Licques (10)
165.	ES Beaurainville (9)	1–0	JS Longuenesse (8)
166.	US Nielles-lès-Bléquin (9)	1–2	Olympique Saint-Martin Boulogne (8)
167.	ASEP Saint-Inglevert (13)	3–1	AS Esquerdes (11)
168.	FC Wavrans-sur-l'Aa (12)	2–1	AS Rang-du-Fliers (10)
169.	Entente Steenbecque Morbecque (14)	0–0 (3–4 p)	AC Tubersent (14)
170.	FJEP Fort Vert (9)	0–3	AS Nortkerque 95 (9)
171.	US Verchocq-Ergny-Herly (10)	2–3	US Attin (9)
172.	US Porteloise (13)	0–1	ES Enquin-les-Mines (9)
173.	ADF Ruminghem (15)	0–9	SC Coquelles (8)
174.	AS Surques-Escœuilles (10)	0–2	FC Sangatte (11)
175.	FC Landrethun-lez-Ardres (14)	1–10	US Montreuil (8)
176.	AS Fillièvres (13)	1–6	US Créquy-Fressin (11)
177.	RC Bréquerecque Ostrohove (11)	0–4	US Blériot-Plage (8)
178.	Verton FC (10)	3–0	Amicale Pont-de-Briques (10)
179.	US Équihen-Plage (11)	–	walkover
180.	AS Conchil-le-Temple (9)	3–1	AS Bezinghem (10)
181.	FC Les Attaques (14)	1–1 (2–4 p)	AF Étaples Haute Ville (9)
182.	AS Audruicq (9)	0–1	ES Saint-Omer Rural (9)
183.	ES Oye-Plage (10)	1–2	ES Arques (8)
184.	AS Wimereux (9)	1–0	Calais Beau-Marais (8)
185.	FC Offekerque (14)	0–1	FCP Blendecques (10)
186.	ES Calaisis Coulogne (8)	4–2	USO Rinxent (9)
187.	Entente Calais (9)	0–1	CA Éperlecques (9)
188.	US Anizy Pinon (12)	0–1	Château Thierry-Etampes FC (8)
189.	CS Blérancourt (12)	1–6	Gauchy-Grugies Saint-Quentin FC (9)
190.	FC Lehaucourt (11)	1–1 (4–2 p)	Internationale Soissonnaise (6)
191.	Septmonts OC (9)	3–5	US Chauny (7)
192.	FFC Chéry-lès-Pouilly (10)	1–1 (4–2 p)	RC Bohain (8)
193.	La Ferté Chevresis FC (11)	1–2	SAS Moy de l'Aisne (9)
194.	IEC Château-Thierry (9)	6–0	US Prémontré Saint-Gobain (9)
195.	US Étreaupont (12)	0–0 (2–4 p)	ES Montcornet (9)
196.	ICS Créçois (9)	1–0	AFC Holnon-Fayet (9)
197.	ASA Presles (10)	1–12	US Laon (6)
198.	US Seboncourt (9)	2–1	FC 3 Châteaux (9)
199.	AS Pavant (12)	2–7	US des Vallées (9)
200.	US Chemin des Dames (10)	0–13	Écureuils Itancourt-Neuville (6)
201.	US Sissonne (9)	0–3 (Note: Tie won by means of forfeit.)	US Ribemont Mezieres FC (7)
202.	CS Villeneuve Saint-Germain (8)	8–0	AS Neuilly-Saint-Front (10)
203.	FC Courmelles (11)	3–0	AS Faverolles Dampleux Fleury (11)
204.	ES Ognes (10)	0–5	US Guise (9)
205.	L'Arsenal Club Achery-Beautor-Charmes (11)	1–2	ALJN Sinceny (12)
206.	Olympique Gricourt (12)	1–1 (3–4 p)	Tergnier FC (9)
207.	La Concorde de Bucy-les-Pierrepont (11)	0–4	Harly Quentin (9)
208.	CS Aubenton (12)	1–3	US Buire-Hirson-Thiérache (8)
209.	Espoir Sains-Richaumont (12)	3–3 (3–1 p)	ASC Saint-Michel (10)
210.	FC Abbecourt (11)	0–2	Stade Portugais Saint-Quentin (8)
211.	US Brissy-Hamégicourt (12)	0–10	AS Beaurevoir (10)
212.	US Vallée de l'Ailette (12)	0–0 (2–4 p)	US Crépy Vivaise (10)
213.	FC Essigny-le-Grand (10)	0–2	FC Lesdins (10)
214.	US Bruyères-et-Montbérault (9)	0–1	BCV FC (9)
215.	SC Origny-en-Thiérache (9)	4–1	US Vervins (9)
216.	ES Viry-Noureuil (11)	0–1	FC Vierzy (10)
217.	US Guignicourt (9)	6–1	Entente Crouy-Cuffies (10)
218.	Union Sud Aisne FC (10)	1–3	US Aulnois-sous-Laon (9)
219.	RC Précy (11)	2–2 (6–5 p)	FC Ruraville (11)
220.	US Villers-Saint-Paul (9)	0–6	US Breteuil (7)
221.	AS Tracy-le-Mont (10)	0–0 (3–4 p)	AS Plailly (10)
222.	US Cires-lès-Mello (9)	3–1	US Balagny-Saint-Epin (8)
223.	USR Saint-Crépin-Ibouvillers (10)	0–1	Hermes-Berthecourt AC (9)
224.	AS Maignelay-Montigny (11)	1–7	US Saint-Maximin (7)
225.	AS Bornel (11)	1–3	Dynamo Canly Lonueil (9)
226.	US Crèvecœur-le-Grand (10)	6–0	ÉC Villers/Bailleul (11)
227.	CS Haudivillers (11)	0–8	AFC Creil (8)
228.	FC Fontainettes Saint-Aubin (10)	0–1	Grandvilliers AC (8)
229.	US Lamorlaye (9)	4–2	SC Saint-Just-en-Chaussée (7)
230.	US Nogent (7)	1–1 (3–4 p)	US Meru Sandricourt (8)
231.	AS Multien (9)	1–3	US Pont Sainte-Maxence (7)
232.	AS Allonne (9)	0–2	US Le Pays du Valois (6)
233.	USM Senlisienne (6)	13–1 (Note: Tie reversed from original draw.)	AS Coye-la-Forêt (10)
234.	AS Verderel-lès-Sauqueuse (11)	0–1	AS Saint-Sauveur (Oise) (9)
235.	US Marseille-en-Beauvaisis (11)	0–2	FC Béthisy (7)
236.	ES Ormoy-Duvy (9)	0–2	JS Thieux (10)
237.	FC Saint-Just des Marais (11)	0–1	FCJ Noyon (10)
238.	USE Saint-Leu d'Esserent (9)	1–1 (0–3 p)	Standard FC Montataire (7)
239.	AS La Neuville-sur-Oudeuil (10)	1–2	US Lieuvillers (10)
240.	AS Ons-en-Bray (10)	1–6	US Chevrières-Grandfresnoy (7)
241.	US Estrées-Saint-Denis (9)	0–1	AS Auneuil (10)
242.	FC Longueil-Annel (8)	0–3	US Gouvieux (7)
243.	US Saint-Germer-de-Fly (12)	1–4	US Ribécourt (9)
244.	FC Lavilletertre (13)	2–6	JSA Compiègne-La Croix-Saint Ouen (10)
245.	US Breuil-le-Sec (10)	1–3	US Bresloise (9)
246.	ES Remy (10)	4–1 (Note: Original match on 4 September 2022 abandoned in the 44th minute. Replayed on 11 September 2022.)	AS Beaulieu Écuvilly (13)
247.	CSM Mesnil-en-Thelle (13)	3–2	ES Formerie (11)
248.	US Étouy-Agnetz-Bulles (9)	3–0	AJ Laboissière-en-Thelle (9)
249.	US Margny-lès-Compiègne (8)	2–5	US Choisy-au-Bac (6)
250.	JS Guiscard (11)	0–0 (5–6 p)	SC Songeons (9)
251.	US Lassigny (9)	0–5	FC Liancourt-Clermont (8)
252.	CS Avilly-Saint-Léonard (9)	0–4	CS Chaumont-en-Vexin (6)
253.	FC Sacy-Saint Martin (11)	0–4	US Plessis-Brion (9)
254.	FC Angy (10)	2–1	FC Esches Fosseuse (12)
255.	FC Saint-Paul (11)	1–3	Tricot OS (10)
256.	ES Licourt (13)	3–1	AS Picquigny (13)
257.	ES Roye-Damery (11)	0–11	US Roye-Noyon (6)
258.	AS Domart-sur-la-Luce (12)	0–5	US Corbie (10)
259.	AS Querrieu (10)	1–4	Entente CAFC Péronne (9)
260.	Boves SC (12)	0–2	US Sailly-Saillisel (10)
261.	SC Fouilloy (14)	1–2	Conty Lœuilly SC (9)
262.	USC Moislains (12)	0–11	FC Porto Portugais Amiens (7)
263.	US Ham (10)	1–1 (2–4 p)	SC Moreuil (8)
264.	FR Englebelmer (10)	1–1 (3–4 p)	FC Méaulte (10)
265.	ES Sains/Saint-Fuscien (11)	1–2	Poix-Blangy-Croixrault FC (10)
266.	AS Cerisy (11)	1–5	Amiens RIF (9)
267.	Olympique Le Hamel (9)	0–0 (5–4 p)	FC Ailly-sur-Somme Samara (7)
268.	RC Salouël Saleux (10)	5–2	Olympique Amiénois (10)
269.	US Marchélepot (11)	0–1	AS Glisy (9)
270.	AS Villers-Bretonneux (9)	0–1	FC La Montoye (8)
271.	Montdidier AC (8)	2–2 (4–5 p)	AS du Pays Neslois (8)
272.	ES Sainte-Emilie/Épehy-le-Ronss (11)	0–3	US Rosières (9)
273.	US Ouvriere Albert (9)	1–2	AAE Chaulnes (9)
274.	US Flesselles (10)	2–0	ES Cagny (11)
275.	US Le Boisle (13)	1–2	ABC2F Candas (10)
276.	Olympique Mollienois (12)	1–3	ES Deux Vallées (9)
277.	Avenir Nouvion-en-Ponthieu (10)	3–1	US Abbeville (8)
278.	RC Amiens (8)	3–2	FC Saint-Valéry Baie de Somme Sud (8)
279.	AAE Feuquières-en-Vimeu (14)	1–6	FC Centuloise (9)
280.	SC Pont-Remy (10)	0–3	JS Miannay-Moyenneville-Lambercourt (8)
281.	CS Crécy-en-Ponthieu (10)	3–1	ES Pigeonnier Amiens (8)
282.	FR Millencourt-en-Ponthieu (12)	1–6	AS Gamaches (7)
283.	SC Flixecourt (9)	2–3	SC Abbeville (7)
284.	AS Woincourt Dargnies (13)	0–3	US Camon (6)
285.	US Bouillancourt-en-Sery (12)	0–7	SC Templiers Oisemont (9)
286.	Olympique Eaucourtois (12)	3–2	US Lignières-Châtelain (10)
287.	US Nibas Fressenneville (9)	3–2	US Friville-Escarbotin (9)
288.	Football Dreuillois (11)	1–0	US Neuilly-l'Hôpital (11)
289.	FC Oisemont (10)	1–0	Auxiloise (9)
290.	AS Quesnoy-le-Montant (13)	0–2	FC Mareuil-Caubert (10)
291.	Fienvillers FC (14)	1–6	ES Chépy (11)

=== Third round ===
These matches were played on 10, 11 and 18 September 2022.

Third round results: Hauts-de-France
Tie no	Home team (tier)	Score	Away team (tier)
1.	Conty Lœuilly SC (9)	1–6	USM Senlisienne (6)
2.	Football Dreuillois (11)	0–9	US Gouvieux (7)
3.	FC Oisemont (10)	0–2	ES Beaurainville (9)
4.	JS Thieux (10)	0–2	AS Wimereux (9)
5.	Dynamo Canly Lonueil (9)	2–2 (4–3 p)	US Étouy-Agnetz-Bulles (9)
6.	JS Desvroise (9)	4–0	SC Moreuil (8)
7.	SC Songeons (9)	3–1	Olympique Hesdin-Marconne (9)
8.	ES Chépy (11)	2–3	Grandvilliers AC (8)
9.	ALJN Sinceny (12)	0–3	Standard FC Montataire (7)
10.	ES Saint-Léonard (9)	2–4	SC Abbeville (7)
11.	US des Vallées (9)	0–3	CS Chaumont-en-Vexin (6)
12.	AS Crémarest (12)	0–5	AS Auneuil (10)
13.	Olympique Eaucourtois (12)	0–11	FC Porto Portugais Amiens (7)
14.	US Plessis-Brion (9)	2–0	AS Plailly (10)
15.	RC Salouël Saleux (10)	1–2	FC Liancourt-Clermont (8)
16.	FC La Montoye (8)	2–0	US Attin (9)
17.	AF Étaples Haute Ville (9)	0–4	AS Étaples (6)
18.	Tergnier FC (9)	0–2	US Crèvecœur-le-Grand (10)
19.	FC Courmelles (11)	1–5	AFC Creil (8)
20.	US Camon (6)	2–2 (2–4 p)	Le Touquet AC (6)
21.	FC Mareuil-Caubert (10)	0–1	US Breteuil (7)
22.	RC Samer (11)	2–5	Hermes-Berthecourt AC (9)
23.	Éclair Neufchâtel-Hardelot (10)	5–0	US Lieuvillers (10)
24.	Amiens RIF (9)	1–2	Verton FC (10)
25.	US Montreuil (8)	3–0	AS Conchil-le-Temple (9)
26.	AS Berck (9)	2–0	US Nibas Fressenneville (9)
27.	RC Amiens (8)	4–0	IEC Château-Thierry (9)
28.	ABC2F Candas (10)	2–0	JS Miannay-Moyenneville-Lambercourt (8)
29.	US Lamorlaye (9)	1–2	Avenir Nouvion-en-Ponthieu (10)
30.	Olympique Saint-Martin Boulogne (8)	0–4	Stade Portelois (6)
31.	US Bresloise (9)	0–2	US Chevrières-Grandfresnoy (7)
32.	RC Précy (11)	0–6	US Chantilly (5)
33.	BCV FC (9)	0–3	AC Amiens (5)
34.	FC Centuloise (9)	0–2	US Cires-lès-Mello (9)
35.	US Corbie (10)	3–0	US Flesselles (10)
36.	CS Crécy-en-Ponthieu (10)	0–4	US Équihen-Plage (11)
37.	Poix-Blangy-Croixrault FC (10)	2–1	FC Vierzy (10)
38.	US Meru Sandricourt (8)	0–1	Olympique Lumbrois (6)
39.	SC Templiers Oisemont (9)	0–3	ESC Longueau (5)
40.	AC Tubersent (14)	2–4	FC Angy (10)
41.	ES Deux Vallées (9)	0–2	AS Gamaches (7)
42.	AS Glisy (9)	2–4	Harly Quentin (9)
43.	ES Boussois (10)	0–1	US Fourmies (7)
44.	AS Kennedy Hénin-Beaumont (15)	0–5	US Pont Sainte-Maxence (7)
45.	Gauchy-Grugies Saint-Quentin FC (9)	3–10	US Mineurs Waziers (6)
46.	CS Habarcq (11)	2–1	JSA Compiègne-La Croix-Saint Ouen (10)
47.	US Guise (9)	1–1 (3–4 p)	Écureuils Itancourt-Neuville (6)
48.	AS Trélon (11)	0–1	Olympique Arras (11)
49.	FFC Chéry-lès-Pouilly (10)	1–1 (3–5 p)	US Le Pays du Valois (6)
50.	AAE Chaulnes (9)	2–3	FC Lesdins (10)
51.	Stade Portugais Saint-Quentin (8)	0–1	CS Avion (7)
52.	US Ribemont Mezieres FC (7)	4–0	Château Thierry-Etampes FC (8)
53.	FCJ Noyon (10)	1–2	US Saint-Maximin (7)
54.	AS Neuvilly (12)	0–10	US Roye-Noyon (6)
55.	ES Montcornet (9)	2–0	US Aulnois-sous-Laon (9)
56.	CSM Mesnil-en-Thelle (13)	0–3	ES Saint-Laurent-Blangy (9)
57.	AFC Ferrière-la-Petite (11)	1–3	JS Écourt-Saint-Quentin (8)
58.	Atrébate FC (12)	0–1	SC Origny-en-Thiérache (9)
59.	US Crépy Vivaise (10)	1–4	US Rosières (9)
60.	ES Licourt (13)	2–3	ES Villers-Outréaux (8)
61.	Espoir Sains-Richaumont (12)	0–5	FC Lehaucourt (11)
62.	ASG Louvroil (9)	1–2	Entente CAFC Péronne (9)
63.	FC Avesnes-sur-Helpe (8)	1–4	AS du Pays Neslois (8)
64.	AS Saint-Sauveur (Oise) (9)	2–2 (1–3 p)	US Guignicourt (9)
65.	Olympique Le Hamel (9)	1–3 (Note: Tie reversed from original draw.)	US Berlaimont (9)
66.	ES Ficheux (14)	1–3	AS Beaurevoir (10)
67.	US Sailly-Saillisel (10)	2–0	AG Solrézienne (10)
68.	ICS Créçois (9)	0–9	US Laon (6)
69.	Olympique Maroilles (10)	0–2	AC Cambrai (6)
70.	US Gommegnies-Carnoy (11)	2–2 (4–2 p)	US Ribécourt (9)
71.	AS Neuvireuil-Gavrelle (13)	0–14	AFC Compiègne (5)
72.	ES Val Sensée (12)	2–3	AAE Aix-Noulette (11)
73.	US Choisy-au-Bac (6)	1–1 (4–5 p)	US Escaudain (6)
74.	Entente Ligny/Olympique Caullery (9)	3–3 (5–4 p)	US Seboncourt (9)
75.	CS Villeneuve Saint-Germain (8)	0–4	US Vimy (5)
76.	Tricot OS (10)	4–0	ES Remy (10)
77.	US Saint-Pol-sur-Ternoise (7)	3–2	ES Caudry (9)
78.	FC Méaulte (10)	1–1 (4–3 p)	US Buire-Hirson-Thiérache (8)
79.	AS Masnières (10)	3–7	AS Brebières (10)
80.	US Vermelles (8)	1–2	US Chauny (7)
81.	SAS Moy de l'Aisne (9)	1–1 (0–3 p)	SC Artésien (9)
82.	US Rousies (10)	1–1 (4–3 p)	FC Béthisy (7)
83.	FC Busnes (13)	0–8	US Lesquin (6)
84.	US Hordain (8)	0–0 (4–5 p)	FC Marpent (6)
85.	RC Labourse (9)	2–0	Fort-Mardyck OC (10)
86.	US Annezin (10)	1–2	Carabiniers Billy-Montigny (7)
87.	ES Arques (8)	2–6	US Biachoise (6)
88.	FC Les Epis (8)	2–2 (7–6 p)	Leers OF (8)
89.	ES Allouagne (12)	1–6	JA Armentières (9)
90.	CSAL Souchez (11)	0–4	US Saint-André (6)
91.	USM Merville (10)	3–3 (4–3 p)	Arras FA (6)
92.	RC Calonne-Ricouart (15)	0–18	ES Bully-les-Mines (6)
93.	US Pont Flers (9)	1–0	Union Halluinoise (9)
94.	FC Wattignies (11)	– (Note: Match abandoned after 60 minutes. FC Wattignies penalised, AS Loos Oliveaux qualify.)	AS Loos Oliveaux (9)
95.	US Ronchin (9)	1–2	Saint-Amand FC (6)
96.	FC Masny (9)	3–3 (3–5 p)	CAS Escaudœuvres (7)
97.	SM Petite-Synthe (10)	1–2	FC Seclin (8)
98.	ESM Hamel (10)	2–3	OS Aire-sur-la-Lys (6)
99.	ES Douvrin (12)	0–3	FC Raismes (7)
100.	Stade Béthunois (6)	5–0	Calonne-Ricouart FC Cite 6 (7)
101.	JS Abscon (11)	0–2	Stade Orchésien (8)
102.	RC Rœulx (12)	2–1	US Lille Moulins Carrel (8)
103.	UF Anhiers (11)	2–9	US Maubeuge (5)
104.	USO Bruay-la-Buissière (8)	3–2	OSM Sequedin (9)
105.	Fenain ES (13)	1–4	US Frais Marais (11)
106.	FC Écaillon (14)	0–3	US Cousolre (9)
107.	OM Cambrai Amérique (9)	0–3	AS Hautmont (7)
108.	AS Beuvry-la-Forêt (8)	3–0	COS Marles-Lozinghem (8)
109.	AO Hermies (10)	0–3	US Provin (7)
110.	Flers OS Villeneuve d'Ascq (9)	2–2 (5–4 p)	Olympique Flinois (9)
111.	FC La Chapelle-d'Armentières (9)	3–5	US Téteghem (9)
112.	US Beuvry (11)	3–2	Verlinghem Foot (9)
113.	FC La Roupie-Isbergues (12)	0–2	SC Hazebrouck (6)
114.	SR Lomme Délivrance (10)	5–1	FC Hinges (11)
115.	AEF Leforest (9)	0–5	Entente Feignies Aulnoye FC (5)
116.	Olympique Hémois FC (9)	0–5	US Nœux-les-Mines (7)
117.	ASC Hazebrouck (8)	1–1 (5–4 p)	US Saint-Omer (6)
118.	US Blaringhem (8)	1–3	FC Madeleinois (7)
119.	ES Haisnes (10)	0–4	AS Dunkerque Sud (7)
120.	OS Fives (8)	1–1 (3–4 p)	AS Sainte-Barbe-Oignies (8)
121.	SC Bourbourg (9)	0–3	Olympique Marcquois Football (5)
122.	SC Fouquières (12)	3–1	CG Haubourdin (9)
123.	ASEP Saint-Inglevert (13)	0–4	FC Quarouble (9)
124.	FA Blanc Seau (11)	1–0	JS Racquinghem (12)
125.	Olympique Onnaingeois (9)	1–1 (8–7 p)	US Saint-Maurice Loos-en-Gohelle (7)
126.	ES Calaisis Coulogne (8)	7–1	USF Coudekerque (10)
127.	US Portugais Roubaix Tourcoing (7)	1–3	FC Loon-Plage (6)
128.	FC Recques-sur-Hem (9)	2–1	AS Steenvorde (6)
129.	Gouy-Saint-André RC (10)	0–11	Grand Calais Pascal FC (6)
130.	FCE La Bassée (15)	0–1	FC Wardrecques (11)
131.	Vieux Condé Foot (10)	2–0	FCP Blendecques (10)
132.	FC Wavrans-sur-l'Aa (12)	1–7	FC Templemars-Vendeville (10)
133.	OC Avesnois (12)	1–1 (2–4 p)	RC Bergues (8)
134.	Espérance Calonne Liévin (9)	0–1	US Aulnoy (9)
135.	ES Sebourg-Estreux (13)	0–1	FC Linselles (9)
136.	FC Annay (11)	0–1	USM Marly (9)
137.	US Tourcoing FC (6)	2–0	US Esquelbecq (7)
138.	FC Lecelles-Rosult (10)	1–3	US Pays de Cassel (6)
139.	AS Albeck Grande-Synthe (10)	0–8	Olympique Grande-Synthe (6)
140.	AS Cauchy-à-la-Tour (13)	1–2	US Ruch Carvin (11)
141.	Bondues FC (7)	3–1	Iris Club de Croix (5)
142.	Olympique Vendin (12)	0–1	US Rouvroy (9)
143.	US Corbehem (10)	– (Note: Tie won by walkover, due to both teams from the matching tie in the previous round being removed from the competition. See tie 85 in the second round.)	walkover
144.	US Fleurbaix (14)	1–3	FC Dutemple (7)
145.	SC Bailleulois (8)	2–1	Saint-Saulve Football (9)
146.	ES Saint-Omer Rural (9)	2–3	ES Enquin-les-Mines (9)
147.	US Walincourt-Selvigny (9)	0–2	CA Éperlecques (9)
148.	Mons AC (8)	3–3 (6–7 p)	SC Coquelles (8)
149.	US Créquy-Fressin (11)	2–2 (4–1 p)	FC Campagne-lès-Guines (9)
150.	AOSC Sallaumines (13)	4–3	Lys Aa FC (10)
151.	US Gravelines (6)	1–1 (5–4 p)	ES Lambresienne (5)
152.	FC Sangatte (11)	1–8	Olympique Héninois (11)
153.	AS Nortkerque 95 (9)	3–2	US Blériot-Plage (8)

=== Fourth round ===
These matches were played on 24 and 25 September 2022.

Fourth round results: Hauts-de-France
Tie no	Home team (tier)	Score	Away team (tier)
1.	ESC Longueau (5)	2–2 (9–10 p)	US Chantilly (5)
2.	US Crèvecœur-le-Grand (10)	4–1	SC Songeons (9)
3.	AFC Creil (8)	3–1	US Gravelines (6)
4.	US Saint-Maximin (7)	0–0(3–5 p)	US Montreuil (8)
5.	US Équihen-Plage (11)	0–11	Grand Calais Pascal FC (6)
6.	JS Desvroise (9)	2–2 (1–4 p)	USM Senlisienne (6)
7.	US Le Pays du Valois (6)	2–0	Standard FC Montataire (7)
8.	FC Angy (10)	2–1	Poix-Blangy-Croixrault FC (10)
9.	Avenir Nouvion-en-Ponthieu (10)	0–2 (Note: Match stopped by the referee in the 90th minute after a home supporter threw an object. Avenir Nouvion-en-Ponthieu penalised.)	AS Berck (9)
10.	US Cires-lès-Mello (9)	0–1	SC Abbeville (7)
11.	US Créquy-Fressin (11)	0–6	US Breteuil (7)
12.	AS Wimereux (9)	3–0	RC Amiens (8)
13.	US Rouvroy (9)	0–7	Le Touquet AC (6)
14.	AS Auneuil (10)	1–2	Hermes-Berthecourt AC (9)
15.	Verton FC (10)	1–1 (4–5 p)	CS Chaumont-en-Vexin (6)
16.	ES Beaurainville (9)	1–3	AS Étaples (6)
17.	FC Porto Portugais Amiens (7)	1–7	AS Beauvais Oise (4)
18.	FC La Montoye (8)	1–0	US Roye-Noyon (6)
19.	ABC2F Candas (10)	0–8	AC Amiens (5)
20.	Dynamo Canly Lonueil (9)	0–3	AS Gamaches (7)
21.	US Chevrières-Grandfresnoy (7)	1–1 (2–4 p)	FC Liancourt-Clermont (8)
22.	FC Méaulte (10)	0–3	US Corbie (10)
23.	Éclair Neufchâtel-Hardelot (10)	3–3 (5–4 p)	Grandvilliers AC (8)
24.	US Rosières (9)	2–2 (2–4 p)	US Gouvieux (7)
25.	Olympique Arras (11)	0–5	Stade Portelois (6)
26.	US Beuvry (11)	0–3	US Nœux-les-Mines (7)
27.	ES Saint-Laurent-Blangy (9)	1–3	JA Armentières (9)
28.	US Corbehem (10)	0–13	Entente Feignies Aulnoye FC (5)
29.	US Gommegnies-Carnoy (11)	0–2	Entente CAFC Péronne (9)
30.	ASC Hazebrouck (8)	0–1	AC Cambrai (6)
31.	USM Merville (10)	1–5	US Mineurs Waziers (6)
32.	US Frais Marais (11)	2–2 (5–4 p)	SC Artésien (9)
33.	US Pont Sainte-Maxence (7)	3–2	US Chauny (7)
34.	FC Madeleinois (7)	1–2	FC Les Epis (8)
35.	AS Loos Oliveaux (9)	4–1	AS Sainte-Barbe-Oignies (8)
36.	US Laon (6)	0–4	Olympique Saint-Quentin (4)
37.	AS du Pays Neslois (8)	1–4	US Escaudain (6)
38.	US Lesquin (6)	0–2	FC Marpent (6)
39.	US Berlaimont (9)	2–0	US Pont Flers (9)
40.	AS Beaurevoir (10)	2–2 (4–3 p)	Écureuils Itancourt-Neuville (6)
41.	AS Brebières (10)	0–1	AS Beuvry-la-Forêt (8)
42.	AS Hautmont (7)	6–1	US Saint-Pol-sur-Ternoise (7)
43.	US Rousies (10)	2–2 (2–4 p)	SR Lomme Délivrance (10)
44.	US Plessis-Brion (9)	0–3	US Maubeuge (5)
45.	US Ribemont Mezieres FC (7)	0–4	FC Chambly Oise (4)
46.	SC Origny-en-Thiérache (9)	4–0	ES Montcornet (9)
47.	Harly Quentin (9)	1–2	US Fourmies (7)
48.	US Guignicourt (9)	1–1 (6–5 p)	CS Avion (7)
49.	CS Habarcq (11)	2–3	Tricot OS (10)
50.	FC Lesdins (10)	1–0	US Sailly-Saillisel (10)
51.	JS Écourt-Saint-Quentin (8)	3–2	US Cousolre (9)
52.	Stade Orchésien (8)	0–1	US Tourcoing FC (6)
53.	FC Lehaucourt (11)	0–2	US Saint-André (6)
54.	SC Bailleulois (8)	6–1	Flers OS Villeneuve d'Ascq (9)
55.	Olympique Héninois (11)	1–3	CA Éperlecques (9)
56.	CAS Escaudœuvres (7)	1–5	OS Aire-sur-la-Lys (6)
57.	Carabiniers Billy-Montigny (7)	1–1 (4–3 p)	RC Bergues (8)
58.	ES Villers-Outréaux (8)	0–1	ES Bully-les-Mines (6)
59.	SC Fouquières (12)	2–0	Olympique Onnaingeois (9)
60.	Olympique Lumbrois (6)	0–3	Wasquehal Football (4)
61.	AAE Aix-Noulette (11)	0–2	US Téteghem (9)
62.	FC Raismes (7)	0–2	Olympique Marcquois Football (5)
63.	FC Dutemple (7)	0–2	US Biachoise (6)
64.	Saint-Amand FC (6)	1–1 (3–4 p)	Olympique Grande-Synthe (6)
65.	ES Enquin-les-Mines (9)	2–3	US Pays de Cassel (6)
66.	Vieux Condé Foot (10)	0–0 (3–1 p)	AS Nortkerque 95 (9)
67.	US Ruch Carvin (11)	0–2	US Vimy (5)
68.	AS Dunkerque Sud (7)	1–1 (3–2 p)	SC Hazebrouck (6)
69.	FA Blanc Seau (11)	2–4	RC Rœulx (12)
70.	AOSC Sallaumines (13)	0–3	AFC Compiègne (5)
71.	SC Coquelles (8)	2–6	Bondues FC (7)
72.	FC Quarouble (9)	1–1 (3–2 p)	USO Bruay-la-Buissière (8)
73.	FC Recques-sur-Hem (9)	4–2	Entente Ligny/Olympique Caullery (9)
74.	FC Templemars-Vendeville (10)	1–3	US Aulnoy (9)
75.	USM Marly (9)	6–0	FC Linselles (9)
76.	ES Calaisis Coulogne (8)	1–1 (6–7 p)	Stade Béthunois (6)
77.	RC Labourse (9)	0–4	FC Loon-Plage (6)
78.	FC Seclin (8)	0–5	US Boulogne (4)
79.	FC Wardrecques (11)	2–6	US Provin (7)

=== Fifth round ===
These matches were played on 8 and 9 October 2022.

Fifth round results: Hauts-de-France
Tie no	Home team (tier)	Score	Away team (tier)
1.	US Guignicourt (9)	0–0 (2–4 p)	AS Gamaches (7)
2.	US Mineurs Waziers (6)	1–1 (4–5 p)	FC Marpent (6)
3.	FC Lesdins (10)	1–4	AFC Creil (8)
4.	US Téteghem (9)	1–1 (5–3 p)	AS Beaurevoir (10)
5.	Stade Portelois (6)	0–0 (4–2 p)	US Chantilly (5)
6.	AS Étaples (6)	1–2	AS Beauvais Oise (4)
7.	AS Loos Oliveaux (9)	0–8	Bondues FC (7)
8.	FC Liancourt-Clermont (8)	1–0	US Maubeuge (5)
9.	Hermes-Berthecourt AC (9)	1–12	US Boulogne (4)
10.	US Crèvecœur-le-Grand (10)	0–1	CS Chaumont-en-Vexin (6)
11.	US Nœux-les-Mines (7)	0–3	US Le Pays du Valois (6)
12.	US Corbie (10)	4–0	US Berlaimont (9)
13.	FC Angy (10)	1–1 (1–4 p)	SC Origny-en-Thiérache (9)
14.	US Fourmies (7)	1–2	AS Hautmont (7)
15.	SC Abbeville (7)	0–3	US Vimy (5)
16.	US Montreuil (8)	0–3	AC Amiens (5)
17.	Le Touquet AC (6)	0–0 (5–3 p)	Olympique Saint-Quentin (4)
18.	US Gouvieux (7)	2–3	US Escaudain (6)
19.	AS Beuvry-la-Forêt (8)	1–0	ES Bully-les-Mines (6)
20.	Tricot OS (10)	2–3	JA Armentières (9)
21.	Grand Calais Pascal FC (6)	1–0	AS Dunkerque Sud (7)
22.	AS Berck (9)	0–3	Entente Feignies Aulnoye FC (5)
23.	Éclair Neufchâtel-Hardelot (10)	2–2 (2–3 p)	US Biachoise (6)
24.	USM Marly (9)	1–4	Olympique Marcquois Football (5)
25.	US Tourcoing FC (6)	0–5	FC Chambly Oise (4)
26.	USM Senlisienne (6)	0–1	US Pays de Cassel (6)
27.	Olympique Grande-Synthe (6)	2–0	AFC Compiègne (5)
28.	OS Aire-sur-la-Lys (6)	0–1	AC Cambrai (6)
29.	FC Recques-sur-Hem (9)	0–2	US Saint-André (6)
30.	SC Fouquières (12)	0–3	USL Dunkerque (3)
31.	FC Les Epis (8)	2–2 (3–5 p)	JS Écourt-Saint-Quentin (8)
32.	US Breteuil (7)	2–2 (2–4 p)	Wasquehal Football (4)
33.	FC La Montoye (8)	0–3	FC Loon-Plage (6)
34.	RC Rœulx (12)	1–0	US Aulnoy (9)
35.	CA Éperlecques (9)	2–1	AS Wimereux (9)
36.	Entente CAFC Péronne (9)	0–0 (4–2 p)	FC Quarouble (9)
37.	SC Bailleulois (8)	0–1	US Pont Sainte-Maxence (7)
38.	Vieux Condé Foot (10)	0–1	Carabiniers Billy-Montigny (7)
39.	SR Lomme Délivrance (10)	0–6	Stade Béthunois (6)
40.	US Frais Marais (11)	0–6	US Provin (7)

=== Sixth round ===
These matches were played on 15 and 16 October 2022.

Sixth round results: Hauts-de-France
Tie no	Home team (tier)	Score	Away team (tier)
1.	AFC Creil (8)	2–2 (3–5 p)	US Pont Sainte-Maxence (7)
2.	Bondues FC (7)	0–0 (5–4 p)	AS Gamaches (7)
3.	RC Rœulx (12)	0–1	US Téteghem (9)
4.	FC Liancourt-Clermont (8)	1–0	US Vimy (5)
5.	US Biachoise (6)	0–4	AS Beauvais Oise (4)
6.	Carabiniers Billy-Montigny (7)	1–3	AC Cambrai (6)
7.	Stade Portelois (6)	0–0 (4–5 p)	FC Chambly Oise (4)
8.	CS Chaumont-en-Vexin (6)	1–1 (4–1 p)	US Boulogne (4)
9.	Entente Feignies Aulnoye FC (5)	2–1	FC Marpent (6)
10.	JS Écourt-Saint-Quentin (8)	0–2	US Le Pays du Valois (6)
11.	AS Beuvry-la-Forêt (8)	1–5	Olympique Saint-Quentin (4)
12.	US Saint-André (6)	0–1	FC Loon-Plage (6)
13.	Stade Béthunois (6)	1–1 (4–1 p)	Olympique Grande-Synthe (6)
14.	AS Hautmont (7)	0–5	US Pays de Cassel (6)
15.	SC Origny-en-Thiérache (9)	0–4	US Escaudain (6)
16.	Entente CAFC Péronne (9)	0–4	Wasquehal Football (4)
17.	Grand Calais Pascal FC (6)	0–2	USL Dunkerque (3)
18.	US Corbie (10)	2–6	Olympique Marcquois Football (5)
19.	CA Éperlecques (9)	2–1	AC Amiens (5)
20.	JA Armentières (9)	2–0	US Provin (7)
