= Bourgeois (disambiguation) =

Bourgeois is the adjectival form of the French bourgeoisie, a loosely defined designated group characterized by private wealth, an upper class social status, and its related culture. Bourgeois may also refer to:

- Bourgeois (surname)
- bourgeois (typography), the name of the type size between brevier and long primer
- H. L. Bourgeois High School, Gray, Louisiana, United States
- Bourgeois is a synonym for these wine grapes:
  - Elbling, in the Mosel region
  - Gouais blanc, historic white grape
- Bourgeois fish, a common name for Lutjanus sebae, a snapper from the Indo-West Pacific
- Les Bourgeois, a song (and album) by Jacques Brel
- "Bourgeoisieses", a song from Conan Gray's 2024 studio album Found Heaven

== See also ==
- Bourgeoys (disambiguation)
