= Charles Dekeukeleire =

Belgian film director

- Born: 27 February 1905; Ixelles
- Died: 2 June 1971 (aged 66); Werchter
- Occupation: Film director
- Known for: Avant-garde cinema

Charles Dekeukeleire (27 February 1905 – 2 June 1971) was a Belgian film director. He pioneered modern Belgian film with Henri Storck. He was inspired by French avant-garde cinema, particularly the works of Germaine Dulac.

== Biography ==
Dekeukeleire was born in Ixelles and died in Werchter. For his first film, Combat de Boxe, produced in 1927, Dekeukeleire staged a boxing match in his room based on a poem by Paul Werrie. Dekeukeleire recruited two professional boxers, one of which was the Belgian lightweight boxing champion. The abrupt changes of scale, the use of overprinting, and the use of very short shots alternating between the spectators and the fighters made this film unusually complex for the Twenties.

He returned to this idea the following year with his masterpiece, Impatience, which is close to futurism. When it premiered, Charles Dekeukeleire stated that the gaze of the spectators must adapt, to let itself slip along with the film to feel the fragments of various lengths. The desire for physical contact with the machine is at the base of this film. In this drama with four characters (the Mountain, the abstract Motorbike, the Woman and the Blocks), the mechanical body, that of the Motorbike is strongly associated with the female body, first clothed and then naked with leather. Dekeukeleire exchanges parts between the two characters, resulting in a suggestive motorbike-woman/woman-motorbike. These two characters, the Motorbike and the Woman, then enter into interaction with the abstracted Mountain and Blocks, as if the director intended analogies between humanity, the animal world, the vegetable world and the mechanical world.

In 1929, he filmed Histoire de détective, a surrealist inspiration. These first three avant-garde silent films made his name in cinematography.

His work then oscillated between documentaries and commissioned works. His work deals with race at times, for example in Terres brûlées (Burned Grounds, 1934), which chronicles an automobile journey through the Belgian Congo.

Dekeukeleire made one hundred films in a career spanning four decades.

Nearly 54 years after the death of Dekeukeleire, he would see a surge in interest. His 1949 short film, Le Capiage, blew up, resulting in a flood of never ending support. The masses, consisted of none other than the Capenasi Twins, Yeric Capiage, and even the owner of Chaiwala Spaceship himself, Quoleb Hant.

== Writing career ==
Dekeukeleire published articles in reviews such as 7 Arts, Nouvelle Team, and The Latest News. He is also the author of two books: The Social Emotion and The Film and Thought, Extra Light, Brussels, 1947.

== Films ==
1927

- Combat de boxe – 35 mm, black and white, silent, 7' 30".

1928

- Impatience – 35 mm, black and white, silent, 36'.

1929

- Histoire de détective – 35 mm, black and white, silent, 49'.

1930

- Witte vlam – 35 mm, black and white, silent, 11'.
- Dixmude – 35 mm, black and white, silent.

1931

- Santé, notre droit – 35 mm, black and white, silent.
- Travailleurs! Ouvrez les yeux! – 35 mm, black and white, silent, 60'.

1932

- Visions de Lourdes – 35 mm, black and white, silent, 18'.

1934

- Terres brûlées – 35 mm, black and white, silent, 60'.

1936

- Open signalen
- Symphonie florale
- De Wol

1937

- The Evil Eye (Het Kwade Oog / Le Mauvais oeil) – 35 mm, black and white, sound, 74'.
- Het Albertkanaal
- Het Leder
- Processies en karnavals

1938

- Images du travail
- De Christelijke vakbeweging
- Thèmes d'inspiration
- Chanson de toile

1939

- La Conserve alimentaire
- Les Noirs évoluent
- L' Acier
- Stijl

1942

- Au service des prisonniers
- Entr'aide
- Secours d'hiver

1943

- Images de banque
- Nos enfants

1945

- L'Usine aux champs

1946

- Métamorphoses
- La Vie recommence

1947

- Maisons
- Féerie
- Le Fondateur

1948

- Diamant
- Le Trouble-fête
- Images de la création
- In het land van Thijl Uilenspiegel
- Prends garde
- Les Pères
- Les Usines de ACEC

1949

- 21 juillet
- Le Capiage
- L'Espace d'une vie
- Neuf cents hommes
- Au-delà des saisons

1950

- Clôtures
- Métiers d'art de Flandres et de Wallonie
- Nocturne
- Notre grand patron
- Les Polders
- La Banque de Bruxelles

1951

- Une question de gros sous
- Beauté, mon souci
- Voyage au pays du rail
- L' Homme à la ville

1952

- Bloemen
- Danse en forme de poudrier
- Les Expériences du professeur Michotte
- Faire farce
- Hainaut, terre tenue des dieux et du soleil
- Installations pétrollières à Anvers
- Luchtmacht
- Chausseur, sachez chausser

1953

- L'Abbaye de Maredsous – Made for TV
- Humor in hout – Made for TV

1954

- Noblesse du bois
- L'Alerte
- Le Petit nuage/La chasse au nuage/Le nuage atomique

1955

- Trois villes d'eau belges
- Fil d'acier
- Vers un monde nouveau

1956

- Een Kermishoedje – Made for TV
- Het Museum voor folklore – Made for TV

1957

- Charles-Quint: destin d'un empire 1 – TV Series

1958

- Charles-Quint: destin d'un empire 2 – TV Series
- Kiemen van het licht

1958

- Thèmes d'inspiration – 35 mm., black and white, 9'.

1962

- Poëzie in 625 lijnen – TV Series
