= Orlando Silvestri =

French footballer (born 1972)

Personal information
- Full name: Orlando Silvestri
- Date of birth: October 20, 1972 (age 54)
- Place of birth: Lille, France
- Height: 1.77 m (5 ft 9 1/2 in)
- Position: Defender

Team information
- Current team: Boussu Dour Borinage
- Number: 29

Senior career*
Years	Team	Apps	(Gls)
1997–2000	JA Armentières		
2000–2002	Cannes	61	(8)
2002–2007	Valenciennes	134	(27)
2007	R. Francs Borains		
- * Club domestic league appearances and goals

Orlando Silvestri (born October 20, 1972) is a French former professional footballer.

== Career ==
=== Introduction to Professional Football ===
After playing for JA Armentières, an amateur football club, he was hired by AS Cannes, where he played 2 seasons from 2000 to 2002.

=== Valenciennes FC ===
Silvestri started playing for the Valenciennes FC in the 2002/2003 season. During this time, he has played in 134 matches and scored 27 times. So far in the 2006/2007 season he has only had one assist and no goals.
