= Bourgeoys =

Bourgeoys may refer to:

- Marguerite Bourgeoys (1620–1700), Catholic saint, founder of the Congregation of Notre Dame
  - Marguerite-Bourgeoys, a provincial electoral district in Quebec, Canada
  - Marguerite Bourgeoys Museum (Montreal)
- Marin le Bourgeoys (c. 1550–1634), invented the flintlock mechanism

== See also ==
- Bourgeois (disambiguation)
