= Gaël Bourgeois =

Swiss politician

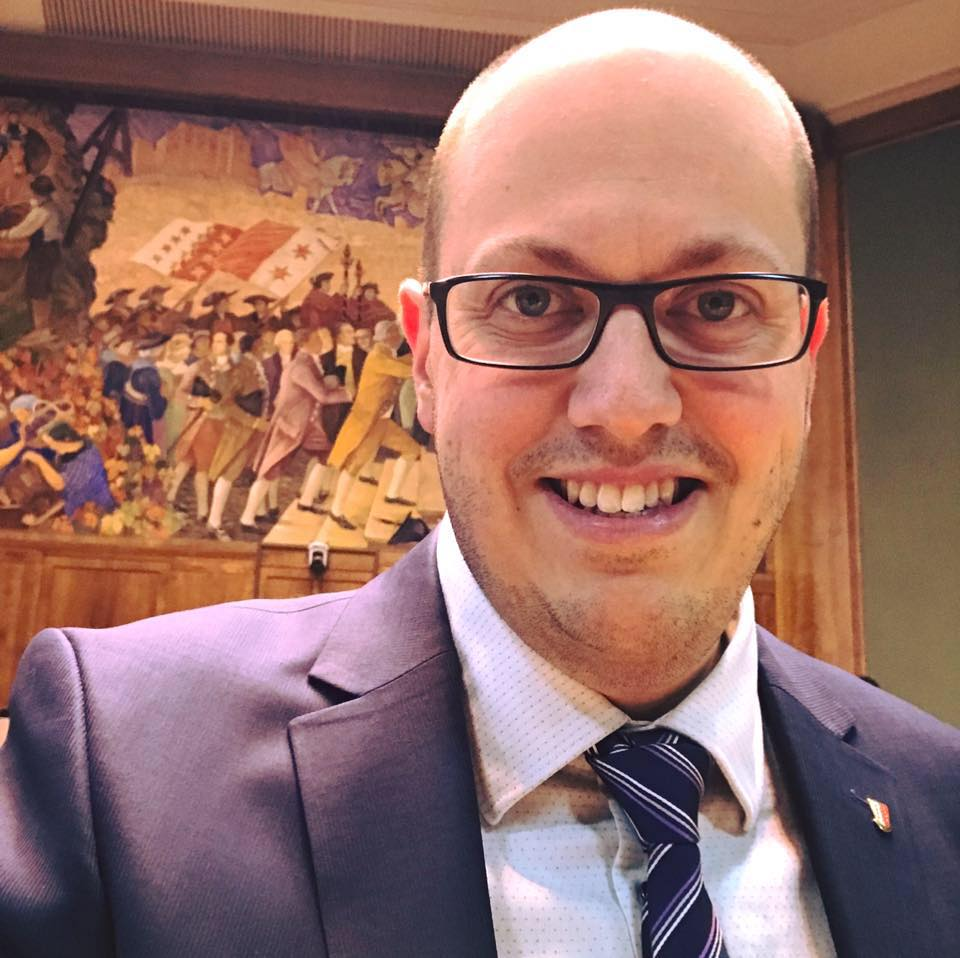
- Bourgeois in 2017

Member of the Grand Council of Valais
- Incumbent
- Assumed office 2005

Vice-mayor of Bovernier
- Incumbent
- Assumed office 2005

Personal details
- Born: 17 June 1983 (age 42)
- Political party: Social Democratic Party of Switzerland
- Education: University of Geneva
- Occupation: Politician; human resources worker

Gaël Bourgeois (born 17 June 1983) is a Swiss politician. A member of the Social Democratic Party of Switzerland (PS), he is a member of the Grand Council of Valais. He is also vice-mayor of Bovernier and also served as president of the Francophone branch PS Valais romand from 2012 until 2015. Outside of politics, he worked in human resources for Securitas AG.

== Biography ==
Gaël Bourgeois was born on 17 June 1983 and was educated at the lycée-collège de la Planta during his youth. In 2002, he became president of Les Jeunesses Socialistes du Valais Romand, remaining there until 2005. In 2007, he obtained his master degree in political sciences at the University of Geneva, and he later worked in human resources for security firm Securitas AG.

In 2005, he was elected to the Grand Council of Valais and the position of vice-mayor of Bovernier. He was president of PS Valais romand, the Francophone Valais branch of the Social Democratic Party of Switzerland (PS), from 2012 until 2015. In 2013, he left his job at Securitas and began work as a deputy national spokesperson for the PS.

In 2016, in response to a dispute with the candidacy of State Council of Valais member Esther Waeber-Kalbermatten, he announced his support for a unified cantonal party to replace the separate PS Valais romand and Parti socialiste du Haut-Valais. In 2018, he was elected to the Valais Constituent Assembly; due to a party ban on dual mandates, he subsequently resigned from the Grand Council and was replaced by Barbara Lanthemann, who was below him on the Alliance de gauche – Entremont Autrement party list at the 2017 Valais cantonal elections.

Bourgeois is gay, having came out in 2015 and spoken to L'Illustré about his experiences as a victim of social media harassment and homophobia.
