= Stade Pierre de Coubertin (Cannes) =

French multipurpose stadium

- La Bocca
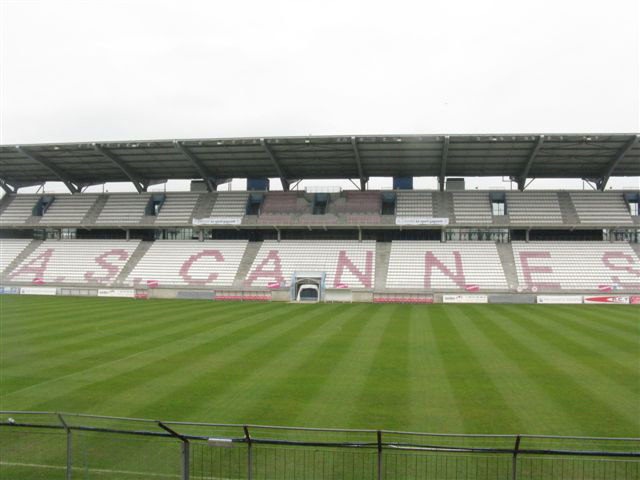
- Interactive map of Stade Pierre de Coubertin
- Location: Cannes, France
- Coordinates: 43°33′11.00″N 6°57′52.59″E
- Capacity: 9,819
- Surface: Grass
- Record attendance: 17,401 (Cannes–Marseille, 31 July 1994)
- Current use: football matches

Construction
- Opened: 1937; 89 years ago
- Renovated: 2000; 26 years ago

Tenants
- AS Cannes

Stade Pierre de Coubertin is a multi-purpose stadium in Cannes, France. The stadium was opened in 1937. It is used mostly for football matches and is the home stadium of AS Cannes. The stadium capacity is 9,819 people.
