= Louis Bourgeois =

Louis Bourgeois may refer to:

- Louis Bourgeois (composer) (c.1510–1559), French composer
- Louis Bourgeois (architect) (1856–1930), Canadian architect
- Louis Bourgeois (footballer) (1937–2022), French footballer

== See also ==
- Louise Bourgeois (1911–2010), French-American artist
