= Paul Bourgeois =

Paul Bourgeois may refer to:

- Paul Bourgeois (astronomy) (1898–1974), see list of minor planet discoverers § P. Bourgeois
- Paul Sablon, aka Paul Bourgeois (1888–1940), Belgium-born cinema pioneer and animal trainer
