= Charles-François Bourgeois =

Charles-François Bourgeois (French pronunciation: [ʃaʁl fʁɑ̃swa buʁʒwa]; 8 March 1759 – 11 July 1821) was a French general during the French Revolutionary Wars and the Napoleonic Wars.

== Life ==
=== 1777–1803 ===
Born in Issy, he first joined the army on 3 December 1777 as part of the régiment d'Auvergne-infanterie. On 26 July the following year he was badly wounded at the naval Battle of Ushant. In 1792 he joined the 8th Paris Volunteer Battalion and on 1 January 1793 he was elected captain and made lieutenant-colonel. He fought with that battalion in the 1792 and 1793 campaigns in the Army of the North and the War in the Vendée. On 12 September 1793 he was one of five men who defended the pont de Cé against an important band of rebels, holding it against musket fire and two guns on the left bank of the Sarthe. After the bridge was broken, he bravely supported Duhoux's retreat, which was routed. He was wounded in that action, winning him a Weapon of Honour and an honourable mention in the decadal bulletin.

On 18 March 1794 (28 ventôse year II), retaining the same rank, he became an adjutant-general in the Army of the West. He was made a chef de brigade on 14 November 1795 (23 brumaire Year IV), he fought in the Army of the Coasts of Cherbourg then transferred to the Army of England for the campaigns of 1796–1798. He was put in command of the 19th Light Demi-Brigade on 21 November 1798 (1 frimaire Year VII), joining the Italian Wars from then until 1801. At the Battle of Marengo general Berthier commanded him to join the right of the army. He formed up his regiment in a tight column by division and bayonet charged the enemy as far the village of Castel-Seviolo, occupying and taking many prisoners. He then held that position under murderous artillery fire and inflicted heavy losses on the enemy. The 19th Demi-Brigade and its colonel also distinguished themselves in the crossing of the Brenta. A few days later he fought an open battle before Montebello - though a horse was killed under him, he pursued the enemy as far as Montecchio Maggiore, defended by three Austrian regiments, and took the town.

=== 1803–1811 ===
When the army was converted into brigades in 1802–1803, he was placed off pay and wrote to Napoleon (then First Consul) to remind him of his past services and ask him for a job. This was successful and he was put in command of the 1st Light Infantry Regiment on 24 September 1803, a knight of the Légion d'honneur on 11 December the same year and an officer of the same order on 14 June 1804. He fought with distinction again with the Army of Italy and Army of Naples from 1803 to 1807, particularly in Calabria, the fighting at Martirano, Sant'Eufemia d'Aspromonte, Reggio di Calabria and San Severo on 5 April, 4011 July and 5 November 1806 as well as in the attack on Strongoli on 22 February 1807.

Badly mistreated over the course of these long and tiring campaigns, the 1st Light Infantry re-formed and reorganised at Verona in 1808. Bourgeois and his regiment joined the Army of Spain the following year, winning glory in Catalonia and Aragon, notably at the sieges of Valencia, Tortosa and Tarragona and the capture of Montserrat. The official bulletin mentions him as being particularly praised for the assault on Tarragona on 21 June 1811.

=== 1811–1821 ===
On 6 August 1811 he was made a brevet général de brigade, fighting as such in the Army of Aragon. Shortly afterwards Napoleon (now emperor) made him a baron de l'Empire. On 11 September 1812 he was put in command of Mequinenza and he was captured with its garrison in 1814 after a long and vigorous defence. He returned to France after the Treaty of Paris and at the end of 1814 Louis XVIII made him adjutant to the inspector general of the 18th and 19th military divisions. During the Hundred Days he offered his services to Napoloeon and was put in command of a brigade of 1st Division of 1st Corps of the Army of the North. On the Second Restoration he was retired by a decree of 1 August 1815. He died in Paris on 11 July 1821.

== Bibliography ==
- A. Lievyns, Jean Maurice Verdot, Pierre Bégat (1844). Fastes de la Légion d'honneur: biographie de tous les décorés accompagnée de l'histoire législative et réglementaire de l'ordre. Vol. 3. Bureau de l'administration.
