= Robyn Bourgeois =

Canadian author and educator

Robyn Bourgeois is a mixed-race Cree activist, academic, author, and educator. She currently resides in Haudenosaunee, Anishinabe, and Huron-Wendat territory in Canada.

== Education ==
Bourgeois received her bachelor's degree in sociology in 2002 from Okanagan University College. She then, studied at UBC-Okanangan, where she received her master's degree in sociology in 2004. She received her doctorate of social justice education from the University of Toronto in 2014. While studying at UBC-Okanaagan, Bourgeois became involved with activism relating to missing and murdered indigenous women and human trafficking.

== Career ==
Bourgeois is an associate professor at the Centre for Women's and Gender studies at Brock University in St. Catharines, Ontario, Canada. Her scholarly work at the university includes Indigenous feminism, violence against Indigenous women and girls, Canadian colonial history and governance, as well as Indigenous women's political activism and leadership. Her work has been published in the Canadian Journal of Women and the Law, Canadian Women Studies, and UCLA Law Review.

In 2014, Bourgeois was critical of the RCMP's National Operational Review on missing and murdered Indigenous women in Canada, arguing that it misses a number of issues including colonialism, racism, and police accountability as causes of the violence epidemic affecting Indigenous women and girls.

In October 2018, Bourgeois testified for the National Inquiry into Missing and Murdered Indigenous Women and Girls, which was established in September 2016 by Prime Minister Justin Trudeau. The National Inquiry looks into potential causes of violence against Indigenous women and girls in Canada. Bourgeois has criticized government inquiries in the past, stating that the initiative allows “the Canadian state to appear that it is doing something without ever having to actually do anything,” but decided to contribute in order to “speak for other trafficked and exploited women." During her talk, she discussed her own experience as a sexual assault survivor and the impact of settler colonialism on people's perception of Indigenous women. Bourgeois cited Disney's Pocahontas and Peter Pan's Tiger Lilly as examples, with each showcasing Indigenous women as sexual object that are prone to settler violence.

In 2019, Robyn Bourgeois was featured in the documentary, Daughters, directed by Riayn Spaero. The film discusses sex trafficking, murder, and sex assault facing Indigenous women in the United States and Canada.

In April 2020, Bourgeois published an online article entitled: Let’s call the Nova Scotia mass shooting what it is: White male terrorism". In it, she alleges that mass murders are not due to mental defects, but the result of perpetrators being "white" and "male".

In October 2020, Dr. Bourgeois was appointed acting vice-provost, Indigenous engagement for Brock University.

== Publications ==
- Deceptive Inclusion: The 2010 Vancouver Olympic, 2009
- Warrior Women, 2014
- Huffington Post Blog on RCMP Report, 2014
- Colonial Exploitation, 2015
- Indigenous Women’s Writing and the Cultural Study of Law, 2018
