= Aubrey J. Bourgeois =

United States Navy admiral (1907–2011)

- Born: December 7, 1907; Paulina, Louisiana, U.S.
- Died: December 4, 2011 (aged 103); Pensacola, Florida, U.S.
- Military career
- Allegiance: United States
- Branch: United States Navy
- Service years: 1930–1965
- Rank: Rear admiral

Aubrey Joseph Bourgeois (December 7, 1907 – December 4, 2011) was a rear admiral in the United States Navy Supply Corps. He graduated from the United States Naval Academy in 1930.
