= Freddy Bourgeois =

French football forward (born 1977)

Personal information
- Date of birth: 23 February 1977 (age 49)
- Place of birth: Revin, France
- Height: 1.81 m (5 ft 11 1/2 in)
- Position: Striker

Senior career*
Years	Team	Apps	(Gls)
1999–2002	CS Sedan Ardennes	11	(0)
2001–2002	AS Cannes	25	(1)
2002–	Valenciennes FC	107	(17)
2003–2004	Nîmes Olympique	30	(6)
2007–2009	Dijon FCO	14	(0)
2009–2012	CSO Amnéville		
- * Club domestic league appearances and goals

Freddy Bourgeois (born 23 February 1977) is a French retired football forward.

Bourgeois played professionally in Ligue 1 and Ligue 2, and the highlight of his career was helping Valenciennes FC win promotion to Ligue 1 during the 2005–06 season.

After he retired from playing football, Bourgeois coached youth football in his native Ardennes.
