= JA Armentières =

French football club

Jeunesse Athletique Armentières is a French football team founded in 1911. They are based in Armentières, France and are playing in the Championnat de France Amateurs 2 Group A, the fifth tier in the French football league system. They play at the Stade Léo Lagrange in Armentières.

From 1996 to 2001, the club played at the fourth level of French football, the Championnat de France Amateurs but were relegated after finishing 16th in their group.

== Current squad ==
As of 24 January 2009

Note: Flags indicate national team as defined under FIFA eligibility rules; some limited exceptions apply. Players may hold more than one non-FIFA nationality.

No.	Pos.	Nation	Player
—	GK	FRA	Stéphane Galoo
—	GK	FRA	Sean Decoudun
—	GK	FRA	Loïc Bocquillon
—	DF	FRA	Julien Vanderhaeghe
—	DF	FRA	Mathieu Vermeire
—	DF	FRA	Pierrick Degryse
—	DF	FRA	Cédric Leman
—	DF	FRA	Pierre Derville
—	DF	FRA	Loïc Leclercq
—	MF	FRA	Arnaud Demars
—	MF	FRA	Julien Toupet

No.	Pos.	Nation	Player
—	MF	FRA	Pierre Courouble
—	MF	FRA	Yannick Maniez
—	MF	FRA	Mohamed Douichi
—	MF	FRA	Rabah Bouramoula
—	MF	FRA	François Noclin
—	MF	FRA	Smaïl Bourouina
—	FW	FRA	Julien Delvoye
—	FW	FRA	Tarik Rajiallah
—	FW	FRA	Adnane N'Sangou
—	FW	COD	Dave M'Boungou
—	FW	FRA	Adnane N'Sangou
