= Pierre Bourgeois =

Belgian poet

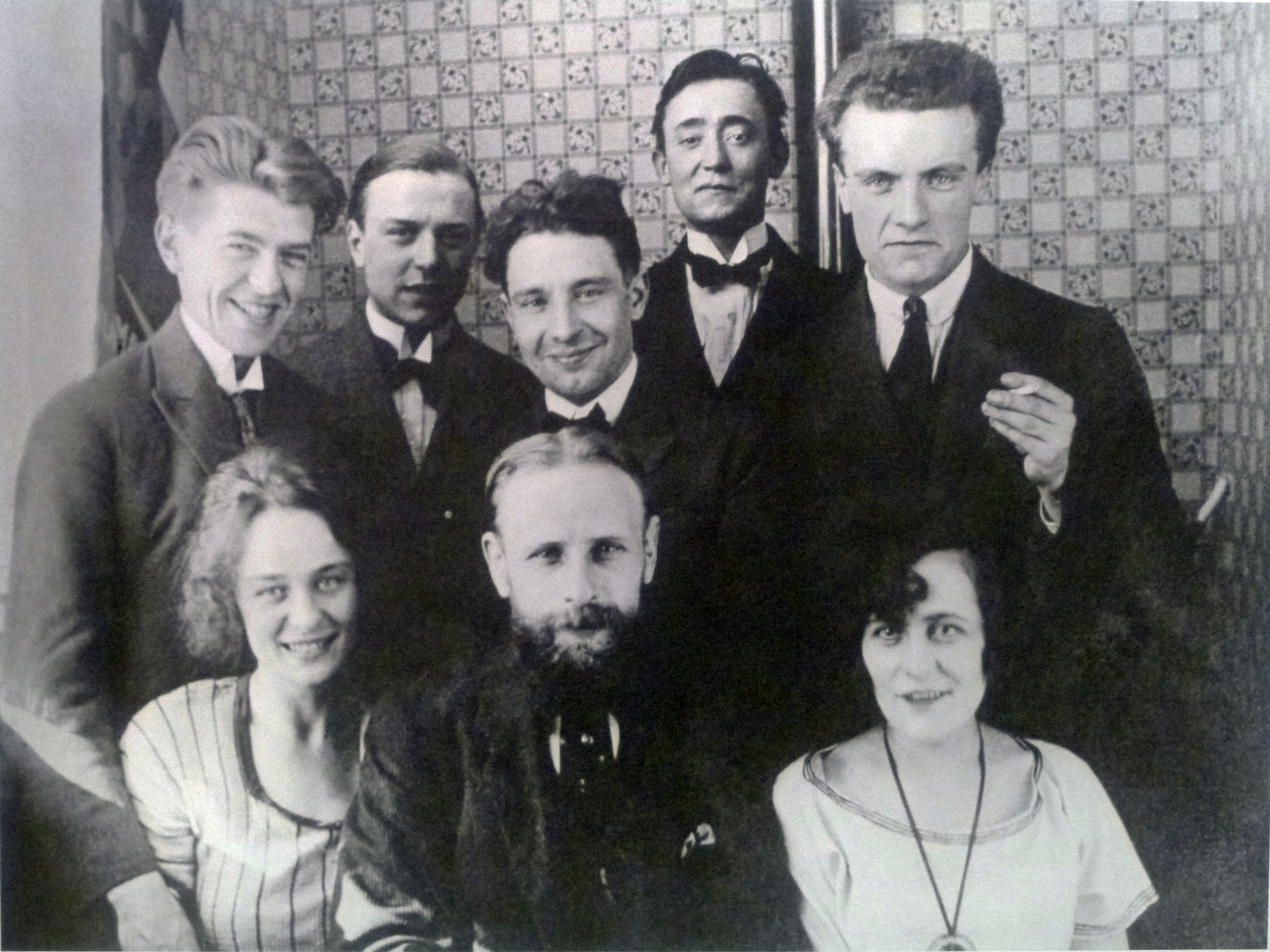
- At the home of Victor Servranckx, the day of Georgette's and René's marriage, June 1922. From left to right, standing: René Magritte, E. L. T. Mesens, Victor Servranckx, Pierre-Louis Flouquet, Pierre Bourgeois; seated, Georgette Berger, Pierre Broodcoorens, Henriette Flouquet
- Born: 4 December 1898; Charleroi, Belgium
- Died: 25 May 1976 (aged 77)
- Occupation: poet

Pierre Bourgeois (4 December 1898 – 25 May 1976) was a Belgian poet. He was born in Charleroi and was the brother of the architect Victor Bourgeois. In his own words, he was a poet for the whole of his life: he published around 800 poems, and hundreds of pages are still unpublished (including a journal of 35 volumes).
