= 2023–24 Coupe de France =

Football tournament season

Tournament details
- Country: France
- Dates: 14 May 2023 – 25 May 2024

Final positions
- Champions: Paris Saint-Germain (15th title)
- Runners-up: Lyon

Tournament statistics
- Top goal scorer(s): Kylian Mbappé (8 goals)

The 2023–24 Coupe de France was the 107th season of the main football cup competition of France. The competition was organised by the French Football Federation (FFF) and is open to all clubs in French football, as well as clubs from the overseas departments and territories (Guadeloupe, French Guiana, Martinique, Mayotte, New Caledonia, Tahiti, Réunion, Saint Martin, and Saint Pierre and Miquelon).

The defending champions Toulouse, who beat Nantes 5–1 in the previous year's final to claim their first Coupe de France title, were eliminated in the round of 32 by third-tier FC Rouen.

Paris Saint-Germain defeated Lyon 2–1 in the final for a record-extending fifteenth Coupe de France title.

== Dates ==
Dates for the first two qualifying rounds, and any preliminaries required, were set by the individual Regional leagues. From round three, the FFF defined the calendar, with rounds up to and including the round of 32 being scheduled for weekends and later rounds up to, but not including, the final, taking place on midweek evenings.

Round	Dates
Third round	17 September 2023
Fourth round	1 October 2023
Fifth round	15 October 2023
Sixth round	29 October 2023
Seventh round	19 November 2023
Eighth round	10 December 2023
Round of 64	7 January 2024
Round of 32	21 January 2024
Round of 16	7 February 2024
Quarter-finals	28 February 2024
Semi-finals	2 April 2024
Final	25 May 2024

== Teams ==
=== Rounds 1 to 6 ===
The first six rounds, and any preliminaries required, were organised by the Regional Leagues and the Overseas Departments/Territories, who allowed teams from within their league structure to enter at any point up to the third round. Teams from Championnat National 3 entered at the third round, those from Championnat National 2 entered at the fourth round and those from Championnat National entered at the fifth round.

The number of teams entering at each qualifying round was as follows:

Region	First	Second	Third	Fourth	Fifth
Nouvelle-Aquitaine	558	125	10	4	1
Pays de la Loire	418	55	28	4	2
Centre-Val de Loire	170	51	8	5	2
Corsica		6	22	2	0
Bourgogne-Franche-Comté	298	89	11	3	2
Grand Est	720	160	46	3	2
Méditerranée	194	11	6	6	2
Occitanie	376	98	9	2	1
Hauts-de-France	718	273	8	6	0
Normandy	258	107	14	2	2
Brittany	446	219	12	3	0
Paris IDF	368	89	12	9	2
Auvergne-Rhône-Alpes	706	149	49	6	2
Réunion				16	0
Mayotte	39	34	12	0	0
Guadeloupe		40	12	0	0
Martinique		52	6	0	0
French Guiana		12	26	0	0
Saint Pierre and Miquelon	2	1 (Note: winner entered into the Brittany draw)			
Total	5271	1571	291	71	18

=== Round 7 ===
The 153 qualifiers from the Regional Leagues were joined by the 11 qualifiers from the Overseas Territories and 20 2023–24 Ligue 2 teams. The qualifiers from Réunion, Martinique, Guadeloupe and French Guiana played off in internal matches.

==== Ligue 2 ====
- Ajaccio
- Amiens
- Angers
- Annecy
- Auxerre
- Bastia
- Bordeaux
- Caen
- Concarneau
- Dunkerque
- Grenoble
- Guingamp
- Laval
- Quevilly-Rouen
- Paris FC
- Pau
- Rodez
- Saint-Étienne
- Troyes
- Valenciennes

==== Regional leagues ====
Nouvelle Aquitaine (14 teams)

- Angoulême Charente FC (4)
- Bergerac Périgord FC (4)
- FC Libourne (4)
- Trélissac-Antonne Périgord FC (4)
- Aviron Bayonnais (5)
- FC Chauray (5)
- AS Panazol (5)
- Stade Poitevin FC (5)
- Étoile Maritime FC (6)
- Jeunesse Villenave (6)
- FC Bassin d'Arcachon (6)
- JA Isle (7)
- FA Morlaàs Est Béarn (7)
- Aunis AFC (8)

Pays de la Loire (11 teams)

- SO Cholet (3)
- Les Herbiers VF (4)
- Olympique Saumur FC (4)
- FC Challans (5)
- US Philbertine Football (5)
- Vendée Poiré-sur-Vie Football (5)
- JS Coulaines (6)
- Stade Mayennais FC (6)
- La France d'Aizenay (7)
- ES Aubance (7)
- Saint-Aubin-Guérande Football (8)

Centre-Val de Loire (6 teams)

- LB Châteauroux (3)
- US Orléans (3)
- Avoine OCC (4)
- SO Romorantin (4)
- FC Montlouis (5)
- Vierzon FC (5)

Corsica (2 teams)

- AS Furiani-Agliani (4)
- Squadra Valincu Alta-Rocca Rizzanese (6)

Bourgogne-Franche-Comté (9 teams)

- Dijon FCO (3)
- FC Sochaux Montbéliard (3)
- Jura Sud Foot (4)
- UF Mâconnais (4)
- Union Cosnoise Sportive (5)
- ASPTT Dijon (5)
- Jura Dolois Football (5)
- Louhans-Cuiseaux FC (5)
- CA Pontarlier (5)

Grand Est (20 teams)

- SAS Épinal (3)
- ASC Biesheim (4)
- SR Colmar (4)
- FCSR Haguenau (4)
- EF Reims Sainte-Anne (5)
- ES Thaon (5)
- US Thionville Lusitanos (5)
- FC Métropole Troyenne (5)
- US Sarre-Union (5)
- Chaumont FC (6)
- US Forbach (6)
- FC Geispolsheim 01 (6)
- SSEP Hombourg-Haut (6)
- Jarville JF (6)
- APM Metz (6)
- FC Mulhouse (6)
- FC Saint-Meziery (6)
- Sarreguemines FC (6)
- ES Villerupt-Thil (6)
- FC Schweighouse-sur-Moder (7)

Méditerranée (5 teams)

- FC Martigues (3)
- Aubagne FC (4)
- AS Cannes (4)
- Hyères FC (4)
- ES Fosséenne (5)

Occitanie (10 teams)

- Nîmes Olympique (3)
- Olympique Alès (4)
- Blagnac FC (5)
- Canet Roussillon FC (5)
- US Castanéenne (5)
- Auch Football (6)
- AS Fabrègues (6)
- US Revel (6)
- Toulouse Métropole FC (6)
- AS Lavernose-Lherm-Mauzac (8)

Hauts-de-France (21 teams)

- US Boulogne (4)
- FC Chambly Oise (4)
- Entente Feignies Aulnoye FC (4)
- US Chantilly (5)
- Iris Club de Croix (5)
- US Le Pays du Valois (5)
- Bondues FC (6)
- RC Calais (6)
- US Choisy-au-Bac (6)
- Écureuils Itancourt-Neuville (6)
- US Laon (6)
- ESC Longueau (6)
- FC Loon-Plage (6)
- US Nœux-les-Mines (6)
- US Provin (6)
- US Saint-Omer (6)
- US Camon (7)
- US Blériot-Plage (8)
- SA Le Quesnoy (8)
- Montdidier AC (8)
- RC Doullens (9)

Normandy (9 teams)

- US Avranches (3)
- FC Rouen (3)
- AG Caennaise (5)
- FC Dieppe (5)
- SU Dives-Cabourg (5)
- Football Club Flérien (5)
- AS Villers Houlgate Côte Fleurie (5)
- FC Équeurdreville-Hainneville (6)
- JS Douvres (7)

Brittany (15 teams)

- Stade Briochin (4)
- Dinan Léhon FC (4)
- US Saint-Malo (4)
- PD Ergué-Gabéric (5)
- US Fougères (5)
- Stade Plabennécois (5)
- GSI Pontivy (5)
- Stade Pontivyen (5)
- TA Rennes (5)
- AS Vitré (5)
- US Liffré (6)
- Plougastel FC (6)
- EA Saint-Renan (6)
- Stade Paimpolais FC (7)
- US Châteaugiron (8)

Paris-Île-de-France (11 teams)

- Red Star FC (3)
- FC Fleury 91 (4)
- Racing Club de France Football (4)
- Entente SSG (5)
- AC Houilles (6)
- FC Plessis-Robinson (6)
- Saint-Denis US (6)
- US Torcy (6)
- US Villejuif (6)
- Olympique Noisy-le-Sec (7)
- Saint-Michel FC 91 (9)

Auvergne-Rhône-Alpes (20 teams)

- FC Villefranche Beaujolais (3)
- Football Bourg-en-Bresse Péronnas 01 (4)
- FC Bourgoin-Jallieu (4)
- Le Puy Foot 43 Auvergne (4)
- Thonon Evian Grand Genève FC (4)
- Chambéry SF (5)
- FC Espaly (5)
- US Feurs (5)
- Hauts Lyonnais (5)
- FC Limonest Dardilly Saint-Didier (5)
- Lyon La Duchère (5)
- AS Saint-Priest (5)
- AS Domérat (6)
- CS Neuville (6)
- Velay FC (6)
- CS Volvic (6)
- FC Chaponnay-Marennes (7)
- Roannais Foot 42 (7)
- FC Roche-Saint-Genest (7)
- FC Seyssins (9)

==== Overseas teams ====
French Guiana: 2 teams

- ASC Agouado
- ASC Le Geldar

Réunion: 2 teams

- La Tamponnaise
- Saint-Denis FC

Martinique: 2 teams

- Golden Lion FC
- AS Samaritaine

Guadeloupe: 2 teams

- SC Baie-Mahault
- CS Moulien

Mayotte: 1 team

- AS Rosador

(French Polynesia) Tahiti: 1 team

- A.S. Pirae (Note: Winner of 2022–23 Tahiti Cup.)

New Caledonia: 1 team

- Hienghène Sport (Note: Winner of 2023 New Caledonia Cup.)

=== Round 8 ===
The eighth round ties for mainland matches were defined at the same time as the seventh round draw. The winners of the seventh round matches in Martinique and Guadeloupe played their eighth round matches at home against teams from mainland France, from a prioritised list of teams who were both willing to travel and still in the competition. If the team from Tahiti were to win their seventh round tie, this eighth round match would take place overseas, and be drawn from the same list. Teams from Réunion and French Guiana were slotted into the draw where gaps appeared due to mainland teams being selected to travel overseas.

==== Prioritised order of mainland teams ====
The prioritised list of mainland teams willing to travel overseas was published on 31 October 2023, along with the priority list of ties they would be allocated to should they remain in the competition beyond the seventh round.

Priority	Mainland team	Tie allocated
1	US Thionville Lusitanos	Seventh round in New Caledonia
2	FC Fleury 91	Eighth round in Guadeloupe
3	ASPTT Dijon	Eliminated in seventh round
4	FC Métropole Troyenne	Eighth round in Martinique
5	Entente SSG	
6	Blagnac FC	
7	Dinan Léhon FC	
8	US Philbertine Football	
9	Jura Dolois Football	
10	Angoulême Charente FC	
11	SU Dives-Cabourg	
12	ASC Biesheim	
13	EF Reims Sainte-Anne	
14	Olympique Saumur FC	
15	FC Libourne	

=== Round of 64 ===
The 46 qualifying teams from Round 8 were joined by the 18 2023–24 Ligue 1 teams. 32 ties were drawn in regional groups.

- Brest
- Clermont
- Le Havre
- Lens
- Lille
- Lorient
- Lyon
- Marseille
- Metz
- Monaco
- Montpellier
- Nantes
- Nice
- Paris Saint-Germain
- Reims
- Rennes
- Strasbourg
- Toulouse

=== Later rounds ===
Later rounds were open draws with no regional grouping.

== Seventh round ==
The draw for the seventh round took place in multiple stages:

- The seventh round in Guadeloupe, Martinique, French Guiana and Réunion took place between the two qualifying teams from each territory, and was drawn and scheduled by the local league.
- The Overseas tie involving the team from New Caledonia was drawn separately on 31 October 2023, against a team from the list of those willing to travel.
- Mainland teams were divided into nine groups, primarily by geography, but also ensuring the groups were balanced in terms of the levels of the teams. The teams from Mayotte and Tahiti were included in these groups, but were drawn away from home. Groups were published on 1 November 2023. The mainland draw took place later on 1 November 2023.

=== Overseas playoff ties ===
18 November 2023	ASC Le Geldar (French Guiana)	3–0	(French Guiana) ASC Agouado	Sinnamary, French Guiana
15:45 GFT	Gourpil 6'; Charlot 19'; Torvic 35'	Report		Stadium: Stade Omnisport; Referee: Jimy Baclet

19 November 2023	La Tamponnaise (Réunion)	2–3	(Réunion) Saint-Denis FC	Saint-Pierre, Réunion
18:00 Réunion Time	M Payet 68', 78'	Report	Assoumani 39'; Vincent 47'; Guichard 90'	Stadium: Stade Michel Volnay; Referee: Julien Rahal

18 November 2023	AS Samaritaine (Martinique)	0–1	(Martinique) Golden Lion FC	Fort-de-France, Martinique
19:00 AST		Report	Catherine 16' (pen.)	Stadium: Stade Pierre-Aliker

22 November 2023	CS Moulien (Guadeloupe)	3–1	(Guadeloupe) SC Baie-Mahault	Sainte-Anne, Guadeloupe
20:00 AST	Tillé 53'; Gotin 89', 90+2'	Report	Urie 57'	Stadium: Stade Valette

=== Overseas team hosting mainland team ===
This tie was drawn on 31 October 2023.

18 November 2023	Hienghène Sport (New Caledonia)	0–4	US Thionville Lusitanos (5)	Nouméa, New Caledonia
14:30 New Caledonia Time		Report	Gourichy 18'; Sylla 77'; Pignatore 82'; Groune 86'	Stadium: Stade Numa-Daly Magenta; Referee: Nicolas Rainville

=== Mainland ties ===
These ties were drawn on 1 November 2023.

==== Group 7A ====
18 November 2023	Stade Plabennécois (5)	1–1 (5–6 p)	FC Challans (5)	Plabennec
18:00 CET	Koné 40' (o.g.)	Report	Dupa 22'	Stadium: Stade de Kervéguen; Referee: Thomas Rocaboy

19 November 2023	Stade Paimpolais FC (7)	2–1	Football Club Flérien (5)	Paimpol
14:00 CET	Carnec 56'; Le Morvan 57'	Report	Attal 75'	Stadium: Stade Charles Bourcier; Referee: Romain Rétif

17 November 2023	Stade Briochin (4)	3–3 (5–3 p)	Concarneau (2)	Saint-Brieuc
19:00 CET	Martin 51', 64'; Le Marer 90+3'	Report	Mouazan 62'; Jannez 85'; Chadli 90+9'	Stadium: Stade Fred-Aubert; Referee: Benjamin Lepaysant

17 November 2023	Les Herbiers VF (4)	2–1	US Avranches (3)	Les Herbiers
19:00 CET	Rémy 78', 81'	Report	Jean 22'	Stadium: Stade Massabielle; Referee: Gabriel Henry

18 November 2023	Dinan Léhon FC (4)	3–1	TA Rennes (5)	Dinan
18:00 CET	Vermet 52'; Le Nouen 69'; Kitenge 70'	Report	Caroff 41'	Stadium: Stade du Clos Gastel

19 November 2023	US Châteaugiron (8)	0–6	AS Vitré (5)	Châteaugiron
14:00 CET		Report	Lebacle 12'; Sorin 14'; Amourette 23'; Le Gall 49'; Pommereul 64'; Delaunay 85'	Stadium: Stade Municipal; Referee: Elian Douart

18 November 2023	SU Dives-Cabourg (5)	2–3	FC Dieppe (5)	Dives-sur-Mer
18:00 CET	Fontaine 83'; Lefebvre 89' (o.g.)	Report	Diaby 38'; Stockley 40'; Sidibé 85'	Stadium: Stade André Heurtematte; Referee: Yann Flament

19 November 2023	PD Ergué-Gabéric (5)	3–1	EA Saint-Renan (6)	Ergué-Gabéric
15:00 CET	Le Noc 16', 42'; Le Reste 80'	Report	Remond 75'	Stadium: Stade de Lestonan; Referee: Louison Olivier

18 November 2023	GSI Pontivy (5)	2–0	Plougastel FC (6)	Pontivy
18:00 CET	N'Kassa 21'; Boittin 38'	Report		Stadium: Stade du Faubourg de Verdun; Referee: Yohan Gagnant

19 November 2023	Stade Pontivyen (5)	1–2	FC Rouen (3)	Pontivy
15:00 CET	Guyomard 89'	Report	Bassin 76'; Dia 86'	Stadium: Stade du Faubourg de Verdun; Referee: Jordane Lomi

18 November 2023	US Saint-Malo (4)	2–2 (2–4 p)	Guingamp (2)	Saint-Malo
18:00 CET	Heinry 52'; Gerbeaud 59'	Report	Courtet 57'; Gomis 90+3'	Stadium: Stade de Marville; Referee: Mikaël Lesage

18 November 2023	AG Caennaise (5)	2–1	US Fougères (5)	Caen
18:00 CET	Huet 48'; Renaux 66'	Report	Pontdemé 20'	Stadium: Stade de Venoix - Claude-Mercier; Referee: Romain Zamo

==== Group 7B ====
18 November 2023	US Provin (6)	0–5	Laval (2)	Villeneuve-d'Ascq
14:00 CET		Report	Tell 9'; Baldé 21'; Vargas 37'; Kadile 42'; Mupemba 90'	Stadium: Stadium Lille Métropole; Referee: Ali Djedid

19 November 2023	US Philbertine Football (5)	2–0	Vendée Poiré-sur-Vie Football (5)	Saint-Philbert-de-Grand-Lieu
14:00 CET	Ngampika 70'; Oumar 77'	Report		Stadium: Complexe Sportif des Chevrets; Referee: Aurélien Grizon

18 November 2023	LB Châteauroux (3)	2–1	Red Star FC (3)	Châteauroux
13:45 CET	Mille 3'; Diarra 89'	Report	Doucouré 15'	Stadium: Stade Gaston-Petit; Referee: Olivier Thual

19 November 2023	US Nœux-les-Mines (6)	2–2 (7–8 p)	Avoine OCC (4)	Nœux-les-Mines
14:00 CET	Jackowski 40'; Galliano 51'	Report	Thonnel 21'; Fivet 49'	Stadium: Stade Camille Tisserand; Referee: Henri Dutech Perez

19 November 2023	US Torcy (6)	0–1	FC Fleury 91 (4)	Torcy
14:00 CET		Report	Sauvadet 78'	Stadium: Stade du Frémoy; Referee: Aldric Chancioux

19 November 2023	JS Douvres (7)	2–1	US Choisy-au-Bac (6)	Douvres-la-Délivrande
14:00 CET	Azdad 53'; Joseph 70'	Report	Koné 8'	Stadium: Complexe Sportif Pierre Roux; Referee: Bastien Lalbie

18 November 2023	FC Plessis-Robinson (6)	2–1	ES Aubance (7)	Le Plessis-Robinson
16:00 CET	Barbette 39'; Chaussat 64'	Report	Robin 90'	Stadium: Parc des Sports du Hameau; Referee: Bastien Melique

18 November 2023	AC Houilles (6)	0–2	Angers (2)	Houilles
14:00 CET		Report	Diony 38'; Abdelli 90' (pen.)	Stadium: Stade Maurice-Baquet; Referee: William Toulliou

19 November 2023	AS Villers Houlgate Côte Fleurie (5)	4–0	FC Équeurdreville-Hainneville (6)	Villers-sur-Mer
14:00 CET	Gaudiche 5'; Khadrejnane 41'; Orgeval 67'; Kowalczyk 80'	Report		Stadium: Stade André Salesse; Referee: Guillaume Danglade

19 November 2023	US Laon (6)	1–2	Racing Club de France Football (4)	Laon
14:00 CET	Lecomte 85'	Report	Hamek 66'; Ricol 90'	Stadium: Stade Marcel Levindrey; Referee: Valentin Cardon

==== Group 7C ====
19 November 2023	Saint-Michel FC 91 (9)	0–2	Entente SSG (5)	Les Ulis
14:00 CET		Report	Kissy 54'; Keita 90'	Stadium: Stade Jean-Marc Salinier; Referee: Florian Della Tomasina

19 November 2023	Olympique Noisy-le-Sec (7)	0–2	AS Furiani-Agliani (4)	Noisy-le-Sec
14:00 CET		Report	Binet 44'; Averlant 65'	Stadium: Stade Salvador Allende; Referee: Guillaume Paradis

18 November 2023	UF Mâconnais (4)	1–2	Louhans-Cuiseaux FC (5)	Mâcon
18:00 CET	Kassa 43'	Report	Barthélémy 19'; Schmitt 56'	Stadium: Stade Pierre Guérin; Referee: Thomas Vincent

18 November 2023	Union Cosnoise Sportive (5)	1–0	US Chantilly (5)	Cosne-Cours-sur-Loire
17:00 CET	Duarte 68' (pen.)	Report		Stadium: Stade Raphaël Giraux; Referee: Victoria Beyer

18 November 2023	US Le Pays du Valois (5)	0–0 (2–4 p)	Auxerre (2)	Chambly
18:00 CET		Report		Stadium: Stade Walter-Luzi; Referee: Thierry Bouillé

18 November 2023	FC Saint-Meziery (6)	1–0	(French Polynesia) A.S. Pirae	Saint-Mesmin
14:00 CET	Radet 35'	Report		Stadium: Stade Hubert Clercy

18 November 2023	US Saint-Omer (6)	1–1 (5–4 p)	Saint-Denis US (6)	Saint-Omer
19:00 CET	Condé 24'	Report	Diané 44'	Stadium: Stade Gaston Bonnet; Referee: Gaëtan Deneuve

18 November 2023	SAS Épinal (3)	2–1	Troyes (2)	Épinal
13:45 CET	Labissiere 48', 85'	Report	Lefebvre 52'	Stadium: Stade de la Colombière; Referee: Antoine Valnet

19 November 2023	SA Le Quesnoy (8)	1–4	FC Métropole Troyenne (5)	Le Quesnoy
14:00 CET	Zelani 43'	Report	Willefert 6'; Matubanzila 45', 71'; Gimbert 63'	Stadium: Stade Hubert Jouanisson; Referee: Jean-Baptiste Esponde

18 November 2023	US Villejuif (6)	2–2 (4–5 p)	Paris FC (2)	Ivry-sur-Seine
14:00 CET	Arby 50', 56'	Report	Diaby-Fadiga 10'; Mbow 83'	Stadium: Stade Edouard Clerville; Referee: Brendan Roffet

==== Group 7D ====
18 November 2023	Montdidier AC (8)	0–4	Quevilly-Rouen (2)	Amiens
18:30 CET		Report	Gbelle 3'; Soumano 10', 37', 40'	Stadium: Stade de la Licorne; Referee: Anthony Ustaritz

18 November 2023	RC Doullens (9)	0–6	Dijon FCO (3)	Doullens
14:30 CET		Report	Ben Fredj 25', 52'; Irié 62'; Drouhin 71'; Schur 82', 85'	Stadium: Stade Jacques Moisson; Referee: Steven Llewellyn

18 November 2023	Bondues FC (6)	0–1	Entente Feignies Aulnoye FC (4)	Bondues
14:00 CET		Report	Azbague 33'	Stadium: Complexe Sportif du Fort; Referee: Maxim Plat

18 November 2023	Écureuils Itancourt-Neuville (6)	3–2	Iris Club de Croix (5)	Itancourt
14:00 CET	Pierre 3', 20'; Duflot 89'	Report	Robert 45'; dos Santos 81'	Stadium: Stade Parc de la Marquette; Referee: Julien Reynet

26 November 2023 (Note: Match postponed due to an unplayable pitch.)	US Blériot-Plage (8)	0–0 (3–1 p)	ASPTT Dijon (5)	Gravelines
14:00 CET		Report		Stadium: Stade des Huttes; Referee: Philippe Lucas

19 November 2023	US Camon (7)	2–5	FC Chambly Oise (4)	Camon
14:00 CET	Zerdab 50', 63'	Report	Oggad 16'; Rampont-d'Audremont 20'; Ouarti 58'; Doucouré 66'; Payet 89'	Stadium: Stade Lucien Jovelin; Referee: Marc Michout

18 November 2023	FC Loon-Plage (6)	0–3	Caen (2)	Loon-Plage
17:00 CET		Report	Le Bihan 45+1' (pen.); Thomas 47'; Kyeremeh 66'	Stadium: Stade Marcel Rosseel; Referee: Edgar Barenton

18 November 2023	RC Calais (6)	2–1	ESC Longueau (6)	Calais
18:00 CET	Beauvue 90'; Prohouly 90'	Report	Delcuse 48'	Stadium: Stade de l'Épopée; Referee: Loïc L'Henoret

19 November 2023	EF Reims Sainte-Anne (5)	1–1 (5–4 p)	US Boulogne (4)	Cormontreuil
14:00 CET	Homsa 67'	Report	Diallo 47'	Stadium: Stade Robert Pirès; Referee: Eddy Rosier

18 November 2023	Chaumont FC (6)	0–1	Dunkerque (2)	Chaumont
14:00 CET		Report	Bah 63'	Stadium: Stade Georges Dodin; Referee: Geoffrey Kubler

==== Group 7E ====
19 November 2023	Jarville JF (6)	2–4	Sarreguemines FC (6)	Jarville-la-Malgrange
14:00 CET	Rigole 47'; Royer 86'	Report	Sahin 22', 28', 70'; Boutargui 82'	Stadium: Stade de Montaigu; Referee: Alexandre Mercier

19 November 2023	ES Villerupt-Thil (6)	0–2	ASC Biesheim (4)	Villerupt
14:00 CET		Report	Reppert 48'; Solvet 73'	Stadium: Stade Auguste Delaune; Referee: Yann Gazagnes

19 November 2023	US Forbach (6)	0–0 (4–5 p)	FC Geispolsheim 01 (6)	Forbach
14:00 CET		Report		Stadium: Stade du Schlossberg; Referee: Brice Bayour

17 November 2023	FC Sochaux Montbéliard (3)	2–1	Jura Sud Foot (4)	Montbéliard
19:30 CET	Daho 37'; Hoggas 60'	Report	Sidibé 19'	Stadium: Stade Auguste Bonal; Referee: Mickaël Leleu

19 November 2023	FC Schweighouse-sur-Moder (7)	2–3	ES Thaon (5)	Schweighouse-sur-Moder
14:00 CET	Grimm 70'; Ajenoe 89'	Report	Comara 50'; Villa 56', 60'	Stadium: Stade Municipal; Referee: Alexis Guillon

18 November 2023	SSEP Hombourg-Haut (6)	0–3	Amiens (2)	Hombourg-Haut
14:00 CET		Report	Gélin 35'; Bouhalloufa 49' (o.g.); Lutin 82'	Stadium: Stade Omnisports Raymond Litzenburger; Referee: Alexandre Perreau-Niel

18 November 2023	US Sarre-Union (5)	1–0	APM Metz (6)	Sarre-Union
17:00 CET	Noumansana 85'	Report		Stadium: Stade Omnisports; Referee: Christophe Tani

18 November 2023	SR Colmar (4)	0–1	CA Pontarlier (5)	Colmar
18:00 CET		Report	Marques 11'	Stadium: Parc des Sports Stadium; Referee: Romain Perpiñan

18 November 2023	FCSR Haguenau (4)	0–2	Valenciennes (2)	Haguenau
15:00 CET		Report	Jung 5'; Bonnet 84'	Stadium: Parc des Sports; Referee: Rémi Landry

18 November 2023	FC Mulhouse (6)	2–1	Jura Dolois Football (5)	Mulhouse
18:30 CET	Kecha 21' (pen.); Chirouf 84'	Report	Sefraoui 26'	Stadium: Stade de l'Ill; Referee: Dario De Quarti

==== Group 7F ====
18 November 2023	Saint-Aubin-Guérande Football (8)	0–3	US Revel (6)	Saint-André-des-Eaux
18:00 CET		Report	Palacios 67'; Boyer 68'; Zahil 70'	Stadium: Stade de l’Île-de-la-Pierre; Referee: Simon Préaux

18 November 2023	Blagnac FC (5)	1–0	Aviron Bayonnais (5)	Blagnac
18:00 CET	Diakité 86'	Report		Stadium: Complexe Andromède; Referee: Maxime Apruzzese

19 November 2023	Jeunesse Villenave (6)	1–0	JA Isle (7)	Villenave d'Ornon
14:00 CET	Charvet 74'	Report		Stadium: Stade Alain Roche; Referee: Elisa Daupeux

18 November 2023	La France d'Aizenay (7)	1–2	FC Libourne (4)	Aizenay
18:30 CET	Baranger 86'	Report	Couterry 66'; Castera 90'	Stadium: Stade Municipal; Referee: Léo Beulet

18 November 2023	FC Chauray (5)	0–1	Pau (2)	Chauray
19:00 CET		Report	Mouton 28'	Stadium: Stade Municipal; Referee: Pierre Legat

18 November 2023	JS Coulaines (6)	2–1	SO Cholet (3)	Coulaines
15:00 CET	Menager 63'; Thebert 90'	Report	Babou 30'	Stadium: Stade André Conty; Referee: Maxime Jamet

19 November 2023	Aunis AFC (8)	0–1	Stade Mayennais FC (6)	La Rochelle
14:00 CET		Report	Hatte 13'	Stadium: Stade François Le Parco; Referee: Romain Bénéteau

18 November 2023	US Liffré (6)	0–3	Rodez (2)	Liffré
15:00 CET		Report	Rajot 14', 80'; Depres 81'	Stadium: Stade Nelson Paillou; Referee: Tifenn Leprodhomme

18 November 2023	FC Bassin d'Arcachon (6)	2–1	Olympique Saumur FC (4)	Arcachon
19:00 CET	Bointchea 21'; Gassama 78'	Report	Kipré 43'	Stadium: Stade Jean Brousse; Referee: Valentin Giorgetti

2 December 2023	Étoile Maritime FC (6)	2–2 (2–4 p)	Trélissac-Antonne Périgord FC (4)	La Rochelle (Note: Initially, the tie was reversed from the draw, as Étoile Maritime FC were unable to secure a suitable stadium in time. Subsequently, Trélissac-Antonne Périgord FC attempted to move the match from the original pitch at Stade Firmin Daudou to a synthetic pitch, due to pitch conditions. Étoile Maritime FC appealed and the match will now take place in La Rochelle, with Étoile Maritime FC at home, on 25 November 2023. The match was further rescheduled for 2 December after the assistant coach of Étoile Maritime FC, Najib Akhannich, died in his sleep on the night of Thursday 23 November to Friday 24 November and his family asked the French Football Federation to postpone the match, which was accepted.)
14:00 CET	Bouhriba 22'; Latrach 90'	Report	Nana Gassa Gonga 42'; Romil 82'	Stadium: Stade François-Le Parco; Referee: Loïc L'Henoret

==== Group 7G ====
19 November 2023	Toulouse Métropole FC (6)	1–4	Ajaccio (2)	Toulouse
15:00 CET	Quemper 49' (o.g.)	Report	Nouri 21', 47', 90'; Campanini 42'	Stadium: Stade des Fontaines; Referee: Faouzi Benchabane

18 November 2023	AS Lavernose-Lherm-Mauzac (8)	0–4	US Orléans (3)	Muret
14:00 CET		Report	Dabasse 15'; Agounon 29'; Halby-Touré 60'; Fortuné 68'	Stadium: Stade Clément Ader; Referee: Soulaimane Chamel

18 November 2023	FC Montlouis (5)	0–4	Bergerac Périgord FC (4)	Montlouis-sur-Loire
20:00 CET		Report	Husson 3'; Escarpit 5'; Tressens 39' (pen.); César Neto 75'	Stadium: Stade Eugène Cholet; Referee: Timothé Bonnot

19 November 2023	FA Morlaàs Est Béarn (7)	0–1	AS Panazol (5)	Morlaàs
14:00 CET		Report	Ba 52'	Stadium: Stade de la Hourquie; Referee: Cédric Mouysset

17 November 2023	Canet Roussillon FC (5)	1–1 (1–4 p)	Bordeaux (2)	Perpignan
20:00 CET	Mboup 5'	Report	Cassubie 47'	Stadium: Stade Gilbert Brutus; Referee: Karim Abed

18 November 2023	Vierzon FC (5)	0–1	Angoulême Charente FC (4)	Vierzon
18:30 CET		Report	Diarra 22'	Stadium: Stade de Brouhot; Referee: Pierre Retail

18 November 2023	Stade Poitevin FC (5)	0–3	US Castanéenne (5)	Buxerolles
18:00 CET		Report	Arné 57', 74', 85'	Stadium: Stade Michel-Amand; Referee: Émeline Rochebilière

19 November 2023	Auch Football (6)	0–4	SO Romorantin (4)	Auch
14:00 CET		Report	Popineau 20'; Yenoussi 64'; Gérard 80'; Germain 88' (o.g.)	Stadium: Complexe Sportif Éric Carrière; Referee: Victor Petigny

==== Group 7H ====
18 November 2023	FC Roche-Saint-Genest (7)	1–2	AS Saint-Priest (5)	Saint-Étienne
18:00 CET	Lornage 13'	Report	Benhmida 16'; Essimi 68'	Stadium: Stade Salif Keita; Referee: Valentin Ougier

18 November 2023	FC Limonest Dardilly Saint-Didier (5)	0–0 (4–5 p)	AS Domérat (6)	Limonest
16:00 CET		Report		Stadium: Parc des Sports Courtois Fillot; Referee: Nicolas Houguet

18 November 2023	Velay FC (6)	1–3	FC Martigues (3)	Saint-Paulien
17:00 CET	Beurlat 68'	Report	Hadjem 7'; Turkaj 45'; Tlili 72'	Stadium: Stade Guy Roux; Referee: Azzedine Souifi

18 November 2023	Olympique Alès (4)	6–1	(Mayotte) AS Rosador	Alès
15:00 CET	Diaby 41'; Ben Nasr 53'; Balmy 64'; Baana Jaba 75', 85'; Jdaini 82'	Report	Djailane 7'	Stadium: Stade Pierre Pibarot; Referee: Samir Zolota

18 November 2023	Lyon La Duchère (5)	4–1	Bastia (2)	Lyon
14:00 CET	Bentahar 32'; Boughanmi 88', 90+4'; Maluvunu 90+2'	Report	Loubatières 39'	Stadium: Stade de Balmont; Referee: Abdelatif Kherradji

18 November 2023	Thonon Evian Grand Genève FC (4)	2–2 (5–4 p)	Aubagne FC (4)	Thonon-les-Bains
16:00 CET	Clairicia 59'; Bamba 70'	Report	Amiri 23'; Gomis 89'	Stadium: Stade de Vongy; Referee: Robin Chapapria

18 November 2023	Hauts Lyonnais (5)	2–0	CS Neuville (6)	Pomeys
14:00 CET	Gueye 87'; Thizy 90'	Report		Stadium: Stade de la Neylière; Referee: Julien Rouquette

19 November 2023	US Feurs (5)	2–1	FC Espaly (5)	Feurs
14:00 CET	Mezaber 45' (pen.); Bathily 50'	Report	Fila 77'	Stadium: Stade Maurice Rousson; Referee: Willy Bertolotti

17 November 2023	FC Villefranche Beaujolais (3)	1–2	Grenoble (2)	Villefranche-sur-Saône
19:30 CET	M'Buyi 6'	Report	Meïssa Ba 55'; Joseph 90'	Stadium: Stade Armand Chouffet; Referee: Romain Delpech

18 November 2023	Chambéry SF (5)	1–0	CS Volvic (6)	Chambéry
18:00 CET	Scarantino 72'	Report		Stadium: Plaine de Jeux Mager; Referee: Tawbane Kani

==== Group 7I ====
18 November 2023	FC Chaponnay-Marennes (7)	0–0 (8–7 p)	Hyères FC (4)	Lyon
14:00 CET		Report		Stadium: Stade Vuillermet; Referee: Gaëtan Martin

19 November 2023	FC Seyssins (9)	0–2	Le Puy Foot 43 Auvergne (4)	Grenoble
14:00 CET		Report	Adinay 45+1'; Pays 90'	Stadium: Stade des Alpes; Referee: Guillaume Janin

18 November 2023	Football Bourg-en-Bresse Péronnas 01 (4)	0–3	Saint-Étienne (2)	Bourg-en-Bresse
13:45 CET		Report	Rivera 45'; Charbonnier 54', 73'	Stadium: Stade Marcel-Verchère; Referee: Aurélien Petit

19 November 2023	Roannais Foot 42 (7)	1–3	Nîmes Olympique (3)	Roanne
14:00 CET	Khebal 18' (pen.)	Report	Mbina 45+3', 78', 87'	Stadium: Stade Henry Malleval; Referee: Ahmed Taleb

19 November 2023	AS Fabrègues (6)	2–2 (3–2 p)	Squadra Valincu Alta-Rocca Rizzanese (6)	Fabrègues
14:00 CET	Pastorel 33'; Cheranti 89'	Report	Diop 30'; Paniagua 87'	Stadium: Stade Joseph Jeanton; Referee: Louis Lungeri

18 November 2023	AS Cannes (4)	2–1	FC Bourgoin-Jallieu (4)	Cannes
18:00 CET	Domingues 50'; Bourois-Belle 61'	Report	Moujetzky 13'	Stadium: Stade Pierre de Coubertin; Referee: Julien Schmitt

18 November 2023	ES Fosséenne (5)	1–2	Annecy (2)	Fos-sur-Mer
17:00 CET	Kwasnik 30' (pen.)	Report	Shamal 21'; Bengueddoudj 87'	Stadium: Stade Parsemain; Referee: Arnaud Baert

== Eighth round ==
The draw for the eighth round took place at the same time as the seventh round, with seventh round ties being paired together.

=== Group 8A ===
10 December 2023	Stade Paimpolais FC (7)	1–1 (1–3 p)	FC Challans (5)	Paimpol
14:00 CET	Gomis 56'	Report	Koné 40'	Stadium: Stade Charles Bourcier; Referee: Gaëtan Deneuve

9 December 2023	Stade Briochin (4)	1–2	Les Herbiers VF (4)	Saint-Brieuc
19:00 CET	Mara 64'	Report	Billy 46'; Rémy 52'	Stadium: Stade Fred-Aubert; Referee: Aurélien Grizon

9 December 2023	Dinan Léhon FC (4)	2–0	AS Vitré (5)	Dinan
18:00 CET	Valla 48'; Vermet 80'	Report		Stadium: Stade Le Clos Gastel; Referee: Henri Dutech-Perez

9 December 2023	FC Dieppe (5)	2–0	PD Ergué-Gabéric (5)	Dieppe
18:00 CET	Diaby 52', 56'	Report		Stadium: Stade Jean Dasnias; Referee: Clémence Gonçalves

9 December 2023	GSI Pontivy (5)	0–1	FC Rouen (3)	Pontivy
18:00 CET		Report	Bassin 58'	Stadium: Stade du Faubourg de Verdun; Referee: Kevin Barbin

9 December 2023	AG Caennaise (5)	0–1	Guingamp (2)	Caen
19:00 CET		Report	Sidibé 71'	Stadium: Stade Michel d'Ornano; Referee: Steven Llewellyn

=== Group 8B ===
9 December 2023	US Philbertine Football (5)	1–2	Laval (2)	Nantes
14:30 CET	Oumar 10'	Report	Bobichon 65'; Tchokounté 86'	Stadium: Stade Marcel-Saupin; Referee: Maxime Jamet

9 December 2023	CS Moulien (Guadeloupe)	1–1 (3–2 p)	FC Fleury 91 (4)	Le Moule, Guadeloupe
15:00 AST	Tillé 54'	Report	Lavigne 43'	Stadium: Stade Jacques Pontremy; Attendance: Thierry Bouillé

9 December 2023	Avoine OCC (4)	4–1	(French Guiana) ASC Le Geldar	Avoine
14:00 CET	Locko 18', 53'; Lemboma 27'; Djemel 75'	Report	Charlot 44'	Stadium: Stade Marcel-Vignaud; Referee: Marc Michout

9 December 2023	JS Douvres (7)	1–5	LB Châteauroux (3)	Douvres-la-Délivrande
13:30 CET	Khoualed 58'	Report	Durbant 2', 19'; Mbengue 50'; Nomel 90'; Sylva 90+5'	Stadium: Complexe Sportif Pierre Roux; Referee: Julien Guéguen

9 December 2023	FC Plessis-Robinson (6)	1–2	Angers (2)	Le Plessis-Robinson
15:00 CET	Petiteaux 4'	Report	Niane 25'; Hunou 79'	Stadium: Parc des Sports du Hameau; Referee: Valentin Giorgetti

10 December 2023	AS Villers Houlgate Côte Fleurie (5)	1–3	Racing Club de France Football (4)	Villers-sur-Mer
13:30 CET	Michel 22'	Report	Harakaté 13'; Hamek 38' (pen.); Ngeuwa 59'	Stadium: Stade André Salesse; Referee: Thomas Vincent

=== Group 8C ===
10 December 2023	Entente SSG (5)	1–0	AS Furiani-Agliani (4)	Saint-Gratien
15:00 CET	Koue Niate 25'	Report		Stadium: Parc des Sports Michel Hidalgo; Referee: Benjamin Lepaysant

16 December 2023 (Note: Match postponed due to an unplayable pitch.)	Louhans-Cuiseaux FC (5)	2–2 (4–3 p)	Union Cosnoise Sportive (5)	Louhans
18:00 CET	Bouly 5'; Cissé 90+5'	Report	Duarte 37'; Lecomte 44'	Stadium: Stade du Bram; Referee: Timothé Bonnot

9 December 2023	FC Saint-Meziery (6)	1–4	Auxerre (2)	Troyes
17:00 CET	Battais 40'	Report	Danois 9'; Ayé 22', 45'; Sinayoko 75'	Stadium: Stade de l'Aube; Referee: Mickaël Leleu

9 December 2023	US Saint-Omer (6)	1–1 (4–2 p)	SAS Épinal (3)	Saint-Omer
18:00 CET	Flahaut 41'	Report	Lepaul 76'	Stadium: Stade Gaston Bonnet; Referee: Guy Grégory Prevot

9 December 2023	Paris FC (2)	3–1	(Réunion) Saint-Denis FC	Paris
17:00 CET	Koré 68'; Diaby-Fadiga 88', 90+5'	Report	Bacary 72'	Stadium: Stade Sébastien Charléty; Referee: Karim Abed

9 December 2023	Golden Lion FC (Martinique)	3–2	FC Métropole Troyenne (5)	Fort-de-France, Martinique
17:00 AST	Lamasine 57'; Singama 63'; Gracien 90'	Report	Mahdaoui 7'; Maigrot 42'	Stadium: Stade Pierre-Aliker; Referee: Romain Delpech

=== Group 8D ===
9 December 2023	Quevilly-Rouen (2)	3–1	Dijon FCO (3)	Le Petit-Quevilly
15:00 CET	Camara 62', 67'; Do Marcoline 90+4'	Report	Nassi 42'	Stadium: Stade Robert Diochon; Referee: Guillaume Paradis

9 December 2023	Écureuils Itancourt-Neuville (6)	2–3	Entente Feignies Aulnoye FC (4)	Itancourt
14:00 CET	Clinke 69'; Belliche 72'	Report	Chah 39'; Lachaab 42'; Hospital 52'	Stadium: Stade Parc de la Marquette; Referee: Yohan Gagnant

10 December 2023	US Blériot-Plage (8)	0–3	FC Chambly Oise (4)	Gravelines
13:30 CET		Report	Oggad 23' (pen.), 45+2'; Doucouré 84'	Stadium: Stade des Huttes; Referee: Florian Della Tomasina

9 December 2023	RC Calais (6)	1–4	Caen (2)	Calais
17:00 CET	Aboukassem 11'	Report	Ntim 71', 84'; Debohi 85'; Mendy 88'	Stadium: Stade de l'Épopée; Referee: Félicien Gazon

9 December 2023	EF Reims Sainte-Anne (5)	1–1 (Note: A report was filed to the FFF by Dunkerque, indicating a suspended player was included on the team-sheet by EF Reims Sainte-Anne, which would result in the team being eliminated and Dunkerque qualifying. On 13 December 2023, the FFF announced it had upheld the report, and that Dunkerque qualified for the next round.) (4–3 p)	Dunkerque (2)	Cormontreuil
13:30 CET	Kyei 38'	Report	Baghdadi 27'	Stadium: Stade Robert Pirès; Referee: Aurélien Petit

=== Group 8E ===
9 December 2023	Sarreguemines FC (6)	3–0	ASC Biesheim (4)	Sarreguemines
18:00 CET	El Moussaoui 5'; Boutargi 19'; Ibrahim Sidow 64'	Report		Stadium: Stade de la Blies; Referee: Valentin Cardon

9 December 2023	FC Geispolsheim 01 (6)	0–4	FC Sochaux Montbéliard (3)	Geispolsheim
14:00 CET		Report	Vitelli 21'; Fatar 26'; Dacosta 56', 71'	Stadium: Stade Municipal; Referee: Tawbane Kani

9 December 2023	ES Thaon (5)	0–1	Amiens (2)	Thaon-les-Vosges
14:00 CET		Report	Mafouta 85'	Stadium: Stade Robert Sayer; Referee: Alexandre Mercier

9 December 2023	US Sarre-Union (5)	0–0 (1–3 p)	CA Pontarlier (5)	Sarre-Union
17:00 CET		Report		Stadium: Stade Omnisports; Referee: Romain Zamo

10 December 2023	FC Mulhouse (6)	1–1 (4–5 p)	Valenciennes (2)	Mulhouse
15:00 CET	Kecha 63'	Report	Lilepo 43'	Stadium: Stade de l'Ill; Referee: Yann Gazagnes

=== Group 8F ===
9 December 2023	US Revel (6)	1–1 (3–2 p)	Blagnac FC (5)	Revel
18:00 CET	Zahil 13'	Report	Ranem 28'	Stadium: Stade Municipal; Referee: Louis Lungeri

9 December 2023	Jeunesse Villenave (6)	2–4	FC Libourne (4)	Villenave d'Ornon
20:00 CET	Charvet 16' (pen.); Diop 23'	Report	Souané 49', 63'; Baskar 54'; Mendy 90'	Stadium: Stade Alain Roche; Referee: Julien Rouquette

9 December 2023	JS Coulaines (6)	1–5	Pau (2)	Coulaines
14:00 CET	Yansane 82'	Report	Mouton 5'; Koudou 19'; Boutaïb 59', 67'; Njoh 65'	Stadium: Stade André Conty; Referee: Léo Beulet

9 December 2023	Stade Mayennais FC (6)	0–9	Rodez (2)	Mayenne
15:00 CET		Report	Depres 5' (pen.); Corredor 25', 45', 60'; Valério 50', 54'; Hountondji 69'; Mambo 75'; Verdier 79'	Stadium: Parc des Sports; Referee: Yann Flament

9 December 2023	FC Bassin d'Arcachon (6)	0–2	Trélissac-Antonne Périgord FC (4)	Arcachon
19:00 CET		Report	Mvoe 36' (o.g.); Wanduka 53'	Stadium: Stade Jean Brousse; Referee: Aldric Chancioux

=== Group 8G ===
9 December 2023	Ajaccio (2)	1–2	US Orléans (3)	Ajaccio
14:00 CET	Marchetti 84'	Report	Fortuné 6' (pen.), 65'	Stadium: Stade François Coty; Referee: Abdelatif Kherradji

10 December 2023	Bergerac Périgord FC (4)	4–2	AS Panazol (5)	Bergerac
13:30 CET	Faty 47'; Luyambula 74'; Glao 77'; César Neto 90+5'	Report	Camara 23'; Bokhari 45' (pen.)	Stadium: Stade de Campréal; Referee: Gaëtan Martin

9 December 2023	Angoulême Charente FC (4)	0–1	Bordeaux (2)	Angoulême
14:00 CET		Report	Marcellin 7'	Stadium: Stade Camille-Lebon; Referee: Mikaël Lesage

9 December 2023	US Castanéenne (5)	0–3	SO Romorantin (4)	Castanet-Tolosan
18:00 CET		Report	Gagnon 56'; Beaka 86', 90+5'	Stadium: Complexe Sportif de Lautard; Referee: Guillaume Janin

=== Group 8H ===
9 December 2023	AS Saint-Priest (5)	3–0	AS Domérat (6)	Saint-Priest
17:00 CET	Essimi 66'; Mila 80'; Benhmida 87'	Report		Stadium: Stade Jacques Joly; Referee: Christophe Tani

9 December 2023	FC Martigues (3)	1–2	Olympique Alès (4)	Martigues
18:00 CET	Orinel 89'	Report	Baana Jaba 13'; Franco 36'	Stadium: Stade Francis Turcan; Referee: Cédric Mouysset

9 December 2023	Lyon La Duchère (5)	2–1	Thonon Evian Grand Genève FC (4)	Lyon
16:00 CET	Mazouni 52'; Bentahar 66'	Report	Bamba 75'	Stadium: Stade de Balmont; Referee: Maxime Apruzzese

10 December 2023	Hauts Lyonnais (5)	0–3	US Feurs (5)	Pomeys
13:30 CET		Report	Aulagnier 30'; Moke 48'; Bathily 76'	Stadium: Stade de la Neylière; Referee: Julien Schmitt

9 December 2023	Chambéry SF (5)	1–1 (5–4 p)	Grenoble (2)	Chambéry
19:00 CET	Tchaptchet 35'	Report	Postolachi 8' (pen.)	Stadium: Chambéry Savoie Stadium; Referee: Faouzi Benchabane

=== Group 8I ===
10 December 2023	FC Chaponnay-Marennes (7)	0–3	Le Puy Foot 43 Auvergne (4)	Lyon
14:00 CET		Report	Meyer 9', 24'; Adinany 10'	Stadium: Stade Vuillermet; Referee: Valentin Ougier

9 December 2023	Saint-Étienne (2)	0–1	Nîmes Olympique (3)	Saint-Étienne
15:00 CET		Report	Picouleau 19'	Stadium: Stade Geoffroy-Guichard; Referee: Antoine Valnet

10 December 2023	AS Fabrègues (6)	2–2 (5–4 p)	AS Cannes (4)	Fabrègues
14:00 CET	Guilaine 36'; Ngniah 75'	Report	Cesa 5'; Leonil 80'	Stadium: Stade Joseph-Jeanton; Referee: Brice Bayour

9 December 2023	US Thionville Lusitanos (5)	2–1	Annecy (2)	Thionville
17:00 CET	Sylla 51'; Baradji 69'	Report	Caddy 18'	Stadium: Stade de Guentrange; Referee: Philippe Lucas

== Round of 64 ==
The round of 64 draw was split into four groups, roughly by geography, with Ligue 1 teams distributed evenly. The draw was made on 11 December 2023 by Sandrine Gruda and Brahim Asloum.

=== Group A ===
5 January 2024	Entente Feignies Aulnoye FC (4)	1–0	Quevilly-Rouen (2)	Feignies
18:00	Deparmentier 13'	Report		Stadium: Complexe Sportif Didier Eloy; Attendance: 1,055; Referee: Rémi Landry

5 January 2024	FC Chambly Oise (4)	1–2	Racing Club de France Football (4)	Chambly
18:00	Sacko 67'	Report	Emmanuel 62'; Ricol 90'	Stadium: Stade Walter-Luzi; Attendance: 1,801; Referee: Faouzi Benchabane

5 January 2024	Sarreguemines FC (6)	0–2	Valenciennes (2)	Sarreguemines
18:00		Report	Diagouraga 21'; Ondoa 87'	Stadium: Stade de la Blies; Attendance: 2,031; Referee: Benoît Millot

6 January 2024	Lille (1)	12–0	(Martinique) Golden Lion FC	Villeneuve-d'Ascq
15:30	Yazıcı 11', 45'; David 25', 36', 75'; Zhegrova 33', 41', 42'; Santos 57'; Haraldsson 64' (pen.), 78'; Messoussa 62'	Report		Stadium: Stade Pierre-Mauroy; Attendance: 13,060; Referee: Thomas Léonard

6 January 2024	Amiens (2)	1–2	Montpellier (1)	Amiens
18:00	Mafouta 59'	Report	Assogba 43' (o.g.); Yeboah 56' (pen.)	Stadium: Stade de la Licorne; Attendance: 5,652; Referee: Clément Turpin

6 January 2024	US Saint-Omer (6)	2–3	Dunkerque (2)	Saint-Omer
18:00	Fontaine 90+1' (pen.); Camara 90+2' (pen.)	Report	Courtet 8'; Youssouf 25'; Gnanduillet 83'	Stadium: Stade Gaston Bonnet; Attendance: 3,626; Referee: Antoine Valnet

7 January 2024	US Thionville Lusitanos (5)	0–1	Marseille (1)	Longeville-lès-Metz
14:30		Report	Aubameyang 63'	Stadium: Stade Saint-Symphorien; Attendance: 27,450; Referee: Romain Lissorgue

7 January 2024	Guingamp (2)	0–2	Rennes (1)	Guingamp
14:30		Report	Kalimuendo 45', 57'	Stadium: Stade de Roudourou; Attendance: 16,822; Referee: Jérôme Brisard

=== Group B ===
6 January 2024	Lyon La Duchère (5)	1–2	Le Puy Foot 43 Auvergne (4)	Lyon
15:30	Bentahar 83'	Report	Karamoko 5'; Adinany 38'	Stadium: Stade de Balmont; Attendance: 1,514; Referee: Abdelatif Kherradji

6 January 2024	Brest (1)	1–0	Angers (2)	Brest
15:30	Raolisoa 63' (o.g.)	Report		Stadium: Stade Francis-Le Blé; Attendance: 10,673; Referee: Stéphanie Frappart

6 January 2024	Sochaux (3)	2–1	Lorient (1)	Montbéliard
18:00	Daho 70'; Macalou 90+3' (pen.)	Report	Pelon 34'	Stadium: Stade Auguste-Bonal; Attendance: 12,947; Referee: Willy Delajod

6 January 2024	Nice (1)	0–0 (4–2 p)	Auxerre (2)	Nice
20:45		Report		Stadium: Allianz Riviera; Attendance: 20,973; Referee: Eric Wattellier
	Penalties
	Guessand (penalty missed); Moffi (penalty scored); Rosario (penalty scored); Lotomba (penalty scored); Laborde (penalty scored)		(penalty scored) Jubal; (penalty scored) Raveloson; (penalty missed) Onaiwu; (penalty missed) Perrin

7 January 2024	CA Pontarlier (5)	0–3	Lyon (1)	Besançon
14:30		Report	Cherki 45'; Maitland-Niles 52'; Lacazette 57'	Stadium: Stade Léo Lagrange; Attendance: 10,132; Referee: Nicolas Rainville

7 January 2024	Chambéry SF (5)	0–3	Toulouse (1)	Chambéry
17:30		Report	Skyttä 7', 35'; Dallinga 84'	Stadium: Chambéry Savoie Stadium; Attendance: 4,619; Referee: Gaël Angoula

7 January 2024	US Feurs (5)	3–5	AS Saint-Priest (5)	Feurs
17:30	Charrat 30'; Lallemand 56'; Aguir 84'	Report	Essimi 15'; Antunes 34'; Pottier 61'; Mila 81'; Ruiz 90+6'	Stadium: Stade Maurice Rousson; Attendance: 1,582; Referee: Aurélien Petit

7 January 2024	Louhans-Cuiseaux FC (5)	0–2	FC Rouen (3)	Louhans
17:30		Report	Dia 35'; Bassin 70'	Stadium: Stade du Bram; Attendance: 2,107; Referee: Ahmed Taleb

=== Group C ===
5 January 2024	Metz (1)	1–1 (1–3 p)	Clermont (1)	Longeville-lès-Metz
20:45	S. Sané 21'	Report	Allevinah 48'	Stadium: Stade Saint-Symphorien; Attendance: 14,987; Referee: Jérémie Pignard
	Penalties
	Asoro (penalty missed); Diallo (penalty scored); Colin (penalty missed); Kouao (penalty missed)		(penalty scored) Allevinah; (penalty missed) Ogier; (penalty scored) Borges; (penalty scored) Zeffane

6 January 2024	AS Fabrègues (6)	1–4	Trélissac-Antonne Périgord FC (4)	Fabrègues
13:00	Cheranti 27'	Report	Diakité 70'; Romil 79' (pen.), 80'; Pothier 90+2'	Stadium: Stade Joseph Jeanton; Attendance: 1,600; Referee: Mathieu Vernice

6 January 2024	Olympique Alès (4)	1–2	Paris FC (2)	Alès
15:30	Mahamat 90+6' (pen.)	Report	Jabbari 3'; Kebbal 77'	Stadium: Stade Pierre Pibarot; Attendance: 2,383; Referee: Hakim Ben El Hadj

6 January 2024	US Orléans (3)	2–1	Nîmes (3)	Orléans
15:30	Dabasse 31'; Lamb Luth 49'	Report	Laurens 28'	Stadium: Stade Marcel Garcin; Attendance: 1,518; Referee: Karim Abed

6 January 2024	SO Romorantin (4)	4–0	(Guadeloupe) CS Moulien	Romorantin-Lanthenay
15:30	Popineau 6', 58'; Gagnon 12'; Arzalai 78'	Report		Stadium: Stade Jules-Ladoumègue; Attendance: 2,410; Referee: Azzedine Souifi

6 January 2024	Entente SSG (5)	1–1 (2–4 p)	Bordeaux (2)	Saint-Gratien
18:00	Luyinga 18'	Report	Ihnatenko 66'	Stadium: Stade Michel-Hidalgo; Attendance: 2,922; Referee: Guillaume Paradis
	Penalties
	Kissy (penalty missed); El Khemiri (penalty missed); Gouriche (penalty scored); Camara (penalty scored)		(penalty scored) Barbet; (penalty scored) Livolant; (penalty scored) Ihnatenko; (penalty missed) Vipotnik; (penalty scored) Pitu

7 January 2024	Lens (1)	2–2 (5–6 p)	Monaco (1)	Lens
14:30	Maouassa 43'; Sotoca 62'	Report	Ben Yedder 1'; Akliouche 21'	Stadium: Stade Bollaert-Delelis; Attendance: 37,571; Referee: Bastien Dechepy
	Penalties
	Saïd (penalty missed); Sotoca (penalty scored); Fulgini (penalty missed); Medina (penalty missed); Danso (penalty scored); Frankowski (penalty scored); Aguilar (penalty scored); El Aynaoui (penalty scored); Thomasson (penalty missed)		(penalty scored) Ben Yedder; (penalty missed) Fofana; (penalty missed) Vanderson; (penalty missed) Boadu; (penalty scored) Zakaria; (penalty scored) Maripán; (penalty scored) Diop; (penalty scored) Ouattara; (penalty scored) Magassa

7 January 2024	Le Havre (1)	2–1	Caen (2)	Le Havre
14:30	Joujou 16'; Kuzyayev 43'	Report	Kyeremeh 26'	Stadium: Stade Océane; Attendance: 20,198; Referee: Benoît Bastien

=== Group D ===
5 January 2024	FC Challans (5)	0–4	Rodez (2)	Challans
18:00		Report	Corredor 3', 13', 63'; Hountondji 55'	Stadium: Stade Jean Léveillé; Attendance: 1,924; Referee: Ruddy Buquet

5 January 2024	Pau (2)	1–4	Nantes (1)	Pau
18:00	Sylla 15'	Report	Mollet 49'; Kadewere 80', 83'; Bamba 88'	Stadium: Stade du Hameau; Attendance: 3,353; Referee: Pierre Gaillouste

6 January 2024	Avoine OCC (4)	0–4	Strasbourg (1)	Tours
18:00		Report	Gameiro 15'; Sahi 18', 73'; Bechikh 89'	Stadium: Stade de la Vallée du Cher; Attendance: 9,484; Referee: Jérémy Stinat

6 January 2024	Les Herbiers VF (4)	2–2 (3–4 p)	LB Châteauroux (3)	Les Herbiers
18:00	Billy 67', 71'	Report	Mille 45'; Pirès 90'	Stadium: Parc des Sports Massabielle; Attendance: 3,642; Referee: Olivier Thual

7 January 2024	Bergerac Périgord FC (4)	2–1	FC Libourne (4)	Bergerac
17:30	Tressens 37'; Mlaab 45'	Report	Souané 35'	Stadium: Stade de Campréal; Attendance: 1,048; Referee: Mikael Lesage

7 January 2024	FC Dieppe (5)	0–4	Laval (2)	Saint-Aubin-sur-Scie
17:30		Report	Bobichon 8'; Kadile 49'; Sanna 63'; Tchokounté 71'	Stadium: Stade Jean Dasnias; Attendance: 4,227; Referee: Thierry Bouille

7 January 2024	Dinan Léhon FC (4)	0–3	Reims (1)	Dinan
17:30		Report	Diakhon 6', 9'; Daramy 81'	Stadium: Stade du Clos Gastel; Attendance: 2,754; Referee: Marc Bollengier

7 January 2024	US Revel (6)	0–9	Paris Saint-Germain (1)	Castres
20:45		Report	K. Mbappé 16', 45', 48'; N'Guessan 38' (o.g.); Asensio 43'; Ramos 71' (pen.); Kolo Muani 76', 90'; Ndour 87'	Stadium: Stade Pierre-Fabre; Attendance: 9,351; Referee: Florent Batta

== Round of 32 ==
The draw was made on 8 January 2024 by Tamara Horacek and Benjamin Moukandjo. Ties took place between 19 and 24 January 2024. The draw featured fifth division side AS Saint-Priest, the lowest-ranked team left in the competition.

19 January 2024	Bergerac Périgord FC (4)	1–2	Lyon (1)	Libourne
20:45 CET	Escarpit 45+1'	Report	Fofana 37'; Caqueret 78'	Stadium: Stade Jean-Antoine Moueix; Attendance: 9,106; Referee: Florent Batta

20 January 2024	Nantes (1)	0–1	Laval (2)	Nantes
17:30 CET		Report	Tchokounté 60'	Stadium: Stade de la Beaujoire; Attendance: 31,962; Referee: Ruddy Buquet

20 January 2024	Le Puy Foot 43 Auvergne (4)	2–1	Dunkerque (2)	Le Puy-en-Velay
17:30 CET	Karamoko 13', 32'	Report	Courtet 77'	Stadium: Stade Charles Massot; Attendance: 2,788; Referee: Benoît Millot

20 January 2024	Trélissac-Antonne Périgord FC (4)	1–2	Brest (1)	Trélissac
17:30 CET	Bisson 75'	Report	Lala 79' (pen.); Satriano 89'	Stadium: Stade Firmin Daudou; Attendance: 2,069; Referee: Jérôme Brisard

20 January 2024	Valenciennes (2)	2–1	Paris FC (2)	Valenciennes
17:30 CET	Foe Ondoa 15'; Masson 48'	Report	Kebbal 10'	Stadium: Stade du Hainaut; Attendance: 3,131; Referee: Benoît Bastien

20 January 2024	Rodez (2)	1–3	Monaco (1)	Rodez
17:30 CET	Mambo 21'	Report	Ben Yedder 10' (pen.), 50', 58'	Stadium: Stade Paul-Lignon; Attendance: 3,236; Referee: Jérémy Stinat

20 January 2024	Bordeaux (2)	2–3	Nice (1)	Bordeaux
17:30 CET	Livolant 59'; Weissbeck 76'	Report	Guessand 36'; Sanson 47' (pen.), 60'	Stadium: Matmut Atlantique; Attendance: 22,960; Referee: Thomas Léonard

20 January 2024	US Orléans (3)	1–4	Paris Saint-Germain (1)	Orléans
20:45 CET	Saint-Ruf 86'	Report	K. Mbappé 16', 63' (pen.); Ramos 72'; Mayulu 88'	Stadium: Stade de la Source; Attendance: 7,800; Referee: Marc Bollengier

21 January 2024	Racing Club de France Football (4)	0–1	Lille (1)	Chambly
17:30 CET		Report	Haraldsson 33'	Stadium: Stade Walter-Luzi; Attendance: 2,517; Referee: Eric Wattellier

21 January 2024	Clermont (1)	1–3	Strasbourg (1)	Clermont-Ferrand
17:30 CET	Zeffane 88'	Report	Sylla 32'; Diarra 49'; Bakwa 60'	Stadium: Stade Gabriel-Montpied; Attendance: 8,128; Referee: Mathieu Vernice

21 January 2024	Sochaux (3)	2–2 (5–4 p)	Reims (1)	Montbéliard
17:30 CET	Michel 21'; Daho 44' (pen.)	Report	Agbadou 6', 82'	Stadium: Stade Auguste-Bonal; Attendance: 18,754; Referee: Hakim Ben El Hadj
	Penalties
	Hoggas (penalty scored); Liénard (penalty missed); Zohi (penalty scored); Daho (penalty scored); Macalou (penalty scored); Fontaine (penalty scored)		(penalty missed) Teuma; (penalty scored) Khadra; (penalty scored) Daramy; (penalty scored) Wilson-Esbrand; (penalty scored) Agbadou; (penalty missed) Okumu

21 January 2024	FC Rouen (3)	3–3 (12–11 p)	Toulouse (1)	Le Petit-Quevilly
17:30 CET	Bezzekhami 16'; Sanson 43' (pen.); Bouzamoucha 64'	Report	Sierro 19' (pen.); Gboho 32'; Nicolaisen 90+2'	Stadium: Stade Robert Diochon; Attendance: 5,100; Referee: Bastien Dechepy
	Penalties
	Sahloune (penalty scored); Bassin (penalty scored); Benzia (penalty scored); Z. Allée (penalty scored); Ouadah (penalty scored); Sanson (penalty scored); Bernasque (penalty scored); Bouzamoucha (penalty scored); Bezzekhami (penalty scored); Aggoune (penalty scored); Kabongo (penalty scored); Sahloune (penalty scored)		(penalty scored) Suazo; (penalty scored) Sierro; (penalty scored) Schmidt; (penalty scored) Dallinga; (penalty scored) Gelabert; (penalty scored) Skyttä; (penalty scored) Nicolaisen; (penalty scored) Edjouma; (penalty scored) Babicka; (penalty scored) Mawissa; (penalty scored) Domínguez; (penalty missed) Suazo

21 January 2024	LB Châteauroux (3)	0–1	Le Havre (1)	Châteauroux
17:30 CET		Report	Ngoura 45+1'	Stadium: Stade Gaston-Petit; Attendance: 3,313; Referee: Nicolas Rainville

21 January 2024	AS Saint-Priest (5)	4–1	SO Romorantin (4)	Saint-Priest
17:30 CET	Pottier 36', 70'; Essimi 40'; Mila 50'	Report	Beaka 89'	Stadium: Stade Jacques Joly; Attendance: 2,700; Referee: Pierre Gaillouste

21 January 2024	Rennes (1)	1–1 (9–8 p)	Marseille (1)	Rennes
21:05 CET	Terrier 53'	Report	Veretout 29'	Stadium: Roazhon Park; Attendance: 28,151; Referee: Jérémie Pignard
	Penalties
	Kalimuendo (penalty scored); Bourigeaud (penalty scored); Santamaria (penalty scored); Le Fée (penalty scored); Blas (penalty scored); Yıldırım (penalty scored); Omari (penalty scored); Belocian (penalty scored); Nagida (penalty scored)		(penalty scored) Veretout; (penalty scored) Balerdi; (penalty scored) Vitinha; (penalty scored) Aubameyang; (penalty scored) Onana; (penalty scored) Luis Henrique; (penalty scored) Clauss; (penalty scored) Garcia; (penalty missed) Gigot

24 January 2024 (Note: Initially scheduled for 20 January 2024 at 17:30 CET, the match was postponed due to snow.)	Entente Feignies Aulnoye FC (4)	0–4	Montpellier (1)	Maubeuge
18:00 CET		Report	Omeragić 59'; Adams 74', 90+2'; Delaye 90'	Stadium: Stade Léo Lagrange; Attendance: 1,797; Referee: Willy Delajod

== Round of 16 ==
The draw was made on 21 January 2024. The ties took place between 6 and 8 February 2024. The draw featured fifth division side AS Saint-Priest, the lowest-ranked team remaining in the competition.

6 February 2024	Sochaux (3)	1–6	Rennes (1)	Montbéliard
20:45 CET	Viltard 65' (pen.)	Report	Gouiri 24', 47'; Salah 29'; Kalimuendo 35', 41'; Bourigeaud 81'	Stadium: Stade Auguste-Bonal; Attendance: 19,393; Referee: Jérémy Stinat

7 February 2024	Lyon (1)	2–1	Lille (1)	Décines-Charpieu
18:30 CET	Orban 39'; Cherki 46'	Report	Alexsandro 54'	Stadium: Parc Olympique Lyonnais; Attendance: 29,085; Referee: Benoît Millot

7 February 2024	Montpellier (1)	1–4	Nice (1)	Montpellier
20:30 CET	Sagnan 74'	Report	Ndayishimiye 29'; Louchet 37'; Cho 39'; Claude-Maurice 62' (pen.)	Stadium: Stade de la Mosson; Attendance: 5,769; Referee: François Letexier

7 February 2024	Strasbourg (1)	3–1	Le Havre (1)	Strasbourg
20:30 CET	Bakwa 21'; Emegha 36'; Senaya 90'	Report	Ayew 30'	Stadium: Stade de la Meinau; Attendance: 19,653; Referee: Clément Turpin

7 February 2024	AS Saint-Priest (5)	1–2	Valenciennes (2)	Saint-Priest
20:30 CET	Benhmida 40' (pen.)	Report	Jung 31'; Doucouré 80'	Stadium: Stade Jacques Joly; Attendance: 4,847; Referee: Florent Batta

7 February 2024	Le Puy Foot 43 Auvergne (4)	2–1	Laval (2)	Le Puy-en-Velay
20:30 CET	Meyer 25', 90+5' (pen.)	Report	Tchokounté 85'	Stadium: Stade Charles Massot; Attendance: 4,045; Referee: Thomas Léonard

7 February 2024	Paris Saint-Germain (1)	3–1	Brest (1)	Paris
21:10 CET	K. Mbappé 34'; Pereira 37'; Ramos 90+2'	Report	Mounié 65'	Stadium: Parc des Princes; Attendance: 46,895; Referee: Benoît Bastien

8 February 2024	FC Rouen (3)	1–1 (6–5 p)	Monaco (1)	Le Petit-Quevilly
20:45 CET	Bassin 45+5'	Report	Balogun 35' (pen.)	Stadium: Stade Robert Diochon; Attendance: 9,219; Referee: Ruddy Buquet
	Penalties
	Sahloune (penalty scored); A. Allée (penalty scored); Z. Allée (penalty scored); Benzia (penalty missed); Ouadah (penalty scored); Sanson (penalty scored); Bernasque (penalty scored)		(penalty scored) Golovin; (penalty scored) Ben Seghir; (penalty scored) Fofana; (penalty scored) Kehrer; (penalty missed) Balogun; (penalty scored) Maripán; (penalty missed) Akliouche

== Quarter-finals ==
The draw was made on 8 February 2024. The ties took place between 27 and 29 February, and on 13 March 2024. The draw featured fourth division side Le Puy Foot 43 Auvergne, the lowest-ranked team remaining in the competition.

27 February 2024	Lyon (1)	0–0 (4–3 p)	Strasbourg (1)	Décines-Charpieu
20:45 CET		Report		Stadium: Parc Olympique Lyonnais; Attendance: 56,602; Referee: Benoît Bastien
	Penalties
	Caqueret (penalty scored); Orban (penalty scored); Maitland-Niles (penalty scored); Cherki (penalty scored)		(penalty missed) Delaine; (penalty scored) Doukouré; (penalty scored) Sissoko; (penalty scored) Emegha; (penalty missed) Perrin

28 February 2024	FC Rouen (3)	1–1 (2–4 p)	Valenciennes (2)	Le Petit-Quevilly
19:00 CET	Loppy 90+1'	Report	Oyewusi 26'	Stadium: Stade Robert Diochon; Attendance: 8,858; Referee: Jérémie Pignard
	Penalties
	Sahloune (penalty missed); Loppy (penalty scored); Allée (penalty missed); Bernasque (penalty scored)		(penalty scored) Cuffaut; (penalty missed) Venema; (penalty scored) Flamarion; (penalty scored) Bansé; (penalty scored) Lilepo

29 February 2024	Le Puy Foot 43 Auvergne (4)	1–3	Rennes (1)	Saint-Étienne
20:45 CET	Adinany 61'	Report	Theate 9'; Bourigeaud 49' (pen.), 82'	Stadium: Stade Geoffroy-Guichard; Attendance: 31,414; Referee: Hakim Ben El Hadj

13 March 2024	Paris Saint-Germain (1)	3–1	Nice (1)	Paris
21:10 CET	K. Mbappé 14'; Fabián 33'; Beraldo 60'	Report	Laborde 37'	Stadium: Parc des Princes; Attendance: 47,619; Referee: François Letexier

== Semi-finals ==
The draw was made on 1 March 2024. The ties took place on 2 and 3 April 2024. The draw featured second division side Valenciennes, the lowest-ranked team remaining in the competition.

2 April 2024	Lyon (1)	3–0	Valenciennes (2)	Décines-Charpieu
20:45 CEST	Lacazette 51' (pen.), 57'; Orban 75'	Report		Stadium: Parc Olympique Lyonnais; Attendance: 56,719; Referee: Stéphanie Frappart

3 April 2024	Paris Saint-Germain (1)	1–0	Rennes (1)	Paris
21:10 CEST	K. Mbappé 40'	Report		Stadium: Parc des Princes; Attendance: 47,879; Referee: Ruddy Buquet

== Final ==
25 May 2024
21:00 CEST

Lyon	1–2	Paris Saint-Germain
O'Brien 55'	Report	Dembélé 22'; Fabián 34'

Stade Pierre-Mauroy, Villeneuve-d'Ascq
Attendance: 46,577
Referee: François Letexier
