= Mory Koné =

French footballer (born 1994)

Personal information
- Date of birth: 21 April 1994 (age 32)
- Place of birth: Paris, France
- Height: 1.90 m (6 ft 3 in)
- Position: Centre-back

Team information
- Current team: Laon

Youth career
- 2001–2004: Montigny-les-Cormeilles
- 2004–2007: Paris Saint-Germain
- 2007–2009: Sannois Saint-Gratien
- 2009–2012: Le Mans

Senior career*
Years	Team	Apps	(Gls)
2011–2012	Le Mans B	9	(0)
2012–2013	Le Mans	23	(0)
2013–2014	Parma	0	(0)
2014	→ Crotone (loan)	0	(0)
2014–2015	Troyes B	7	(0)
2014–2019	Troyes	13	(0)
2018	→ Tours (loan)	9	(0)
2020–2022	Entente SSG	35	(0)
2022–2023	Vierzon	29	(0)
2023–2025	FC Challans	36	(2)
2025–	Laon	0	(0)

International career
2010	France U17	1	(0)
2011	Ivory Coast U17	4	(0)
2011–2012	France U18	3	(0)
2012	France U19	2	(0)
2013–2014	France U20	5	(0)
- * Club domestic league appearances and goals as of 13:37, 3 October 2025 (UTC)

Mory Koné (born 21 April 1994) is a French professional footballer who plays as a centre-back for US Laon.

Koné is of Ivorian descent and has represented both his birth and ancestral nation at international level. He has represented France at under-17 and under-18 level, while he represented Ivory Coast at the 2011 FIFA U-17 World Cup.

== Club career ==
=== Le Mans ===
Koné was born in Paris. Ahead of the 2012–13 season, he was promoted to Le Mans's senior team by manager Denis Zanko and assigned the number 21 shirt. Koné made his professional debut on 7 August 2012 in a Coupe de la Ligue match against Laval.

=== Parma ===
On 31 August 2013, it was confirmed that Koné moved to Serie A side Parma from Le Mans. He joined Crotone in Serie B on 17 January 2014, signing a loan deal until the end of the 2013–14 season.

=== Troyes ===
After a year in Italy, Koné returned France signing a three-year contract with Ligue 2 side ESTAC.

In January 2018, he joined Tours FC of Ligue 2 on loan for the rest of the season.

=== Amateur football ===
In May 2020, Koné was the first recruit for Entente SSG for the 2020–21 Championnat National 2 season. In August 2022 he was recruited by Vierzon FC in the same league. For the 2023–24 season, he joined Challans FC, where he scored as the team qualified for the round of 64 of the Coupe de France.

== International career ==
=== France ===
Although Kone has represented France at U17, U18 and U19 level, he has never represented them in an official competition. Kone represented France U17 in a friendly versus Russia on 5 August 2010, France lost 3–0. A year later, he played in a 2–0 loss against Ukraine at U18 level. He also played in two victories over Finland in May 2012 at U18 level. He has represented France U19 twice, on 8 September 2012 versus Switzerland in a 1–0 victory and again on 14 November 2012 in a 3–0 loss to Germany.

=== Ivory Coast ===
In June 2011, he represented Ivory Coast in the U17 FIFA World Cup, he played in four games and featured in a 3–2 loss against France.

== Career statistics ==
=== Club ===
As of 30 June 2013

Appearances and goals by club, season and competition
Club	Season	League		Cup (Note: Includes Coupe de France, Coupe de la Ligue, Trophée des champions, Coppa Italia)		Europe (Note: Includes UEFA Champions League, UEFA Europa League)		Total	
Club	Season	Apps	Goals	Apps	Goals	Apps	Goals	Apps	Goals
Le Mans	2012–13	24	0	1	0	—		25	0
Parma	2013–14	0	0	1	0	—		1	0
Career total		24	0	2	0	0	0	26	0
