= 2026–27 USL Dunkerque season =

USL Dunkerque
2026–27 season
- Ligue 2: Pre-season
- Coupe de France: Pre-season

The 2026–27 season is the 118th season in the history of Union Sportive du Littoral de Dunkerque and their fourth consecutive season in Ligue 2. The club will also compete in the Coupe de France.

== Transfers ==
=== In ===
Pos.	Player	Transferred from	Fee	Date	Source
MF	(Russia) Yegor Prutsev	(Serbia) Red Star Belgrade	Free	1 July 2026	
MF	(Cameroon) Franck Atoen	(Turkey) Samsunspor	Loan	3 July 2026	
MF	(France) Adrien Lebeau	(Germany) Hansa Rostock	Free	3 July 2026	
FW	(France) Souleymane Keita	(France) US Boulogne Côte d'Opale	Free	4 July 2026	

=== Out ===
Pos.	Player	Transferred to	Fee	Date	Source
MF	(Cameroon) Morgan Bokele	(France) Metz	Loan return	30 June 2026	
GK	(France) Mathys Niflore	(France) Toulouse	Loan return	30 June 2026	
MF	(France) Enzo Bardeli	(Spain) Levante	Free	1 July 2026	
DF	(France) Alec Georgen	(France) Lorient	Free	1 July 2026	
MF	(France) Marco Essimi	(Portugal) Alverca	Free	1 July 2026	

== Pre-season and friendlies ==
4 July 2026 Friendly	Dunkerque (France)	0–2	(France) Valenciennes
11:30			Abi 25', 33'

25 July 2026 Friendly	Dunkerque (France)	1–3	(Belgium) Westerlo
13:30

1 August 2026 Friendly	Dunkerque (France)	v	(Belgium) Mechelen
14:00

== Competitions ==
=== Ligue 2 ===
Pos	Team	Pld	W	D	L	GF	GA	GD	Pts	Promotion or Relegation
3	Clermont	0	0	0	0	0	0	0	0	Qualification for promotion play-off semi-final
4	Dijon	0	0	0	0	0	0	0	0	Qualification for promotion play-off quarter-final
5	Dunkerque	0	0	0	0	0	0	0	0	Qualification for promotion play-off quarter-final
6	Grenoble	0	0	0	0	0	0	0	0	
7	Guingamp	0	0	0	0	0	0	0	0	

Source: Ligue 2
Rules for classification: 1) Points; 2) Goal difference; 3) Number of goals scored; 4) Head-to-head goal difference; 5) Fair play points
