= Abdourahim Moina =

French-Comorian footballer (born 2000)

Personal information
- Full name: Abdourahim Moina Afia Alidi
- Date of birth: 17 December 2000 (age 25)
- Place of birth: Saint-Denis, France
- Height: 1.80 m (5 ft 11 in)
- Position: Midfielder

Team information
- Current team: Jura Dolois

Youth career
- –2017: Red Star
- 2017–2018: Aubervilliers

Senior career*
Years	Team	Apps	(Gls)
2018–2021	Concarneau	29	(1)
2022–2023	GOAL	12	(1)
2023–2025	Lyon-La Duchère	46	(8)
2025–	Jura Dolois	14	(3)

International career^{‡}
2021–	Comoros	1	(0)
- * Club domestic league appearances and goals as of 14 February 2026 ‡ National team caps and goals as of 21:53, 3 July 2021 (UTC)

Abdourahim Moina Afia Alidi (born 17 December 2000) is a footballer who plays as a midfielder for French fifth-tier Championnat National 3 club Jura Dolois and the Comoros national football team. Born in France, he represents Comoros internationally.

== Club career ==
After playing youth football for Red Star, Moina spent the 2017–18 season with their under-19 side before signing for Concarneau in summer 2018. He was released by Concarneau in summer 2021, having scored once in 29 league matches for the club.

He joined GOAL FC in June 2022.

== International career ==
Born in Saint-Denis, France, Moina represents the Comoros national football team internationally, having received his first call-up in June 2021 for a 2021 FIFA Arab Cup qualification match against Palestine on 24 June. Moina made his debut for Comoros in that match against Palestine, with Moina playing 90 minutes as Comoros lost 5–1.
