= Kamel Djabour =

French footballer and coach (born 1959)

Personal information
- Date of birth: 12 June 1959 (age 67)
- Place of birth: Paris, France
- Position: Defender

Senior career*
Years	Team	Apps	(Gls)
1988–1990	Le Blanc-Mesnil		

Managerial career
- 1993–1994: Versailles
- 1994–1996: Suresnes
- 1996–2002: Racing CFF (youth)
- 2002–2004: Racing CFF (assistant)
- 2004: Racing CFF
- 2006–2009: L'Entente SSG
- 2009–2010: Dynamo Abomey
- 2010: Tonnerre d'Abomey FC
- 2012: AJ Auxerre (assistant)
- 2012–2013: Congo
- 2013–2014: JSM Béjaïa
- 2014–2016: Stade Malien
- 2016–2017: Dubai CSC
- 2017–2018: Al-Ittihad Kalba
- 2018–2019: Al-Jahra SC
- * Club domestic league appearances and goals

Kamel Djabour (born 12 June 1959) is a French football coach and former player.

== Early and personal life ==
Djabour was born in Paris on 12 June 1959. He is of Algerian origin.

== Playing career ==
Djabour played as a defender for Le Blanc-Mesnil.

== Coaching career ==
Djabour has worked with clubs in Benin with Dynamo Abomey and Mali with Stade Malien. He left his position as assistant manager of French club Auxerre to become manager of the Congo national team. He managed Algerian side JSM Béjaïa between October 2013 and February 2014.
