= Melvyn Doremus =

Association football player (born 1996)

Personal information
- Date of birth: 29 October 1996 (age 30)
- Place of birth: Sannois, France
- Height: 1.79 m (5 ft 10 in)
- Position: Midfielder

Team information
- Current team: Lusitanos Saint-Maur
- Number: 22

Senior career*
Years	Team	Apps	(Gls)
2014–2019	Entente SSG	40	(0)
2019–2020	FC 93	20	(1)
2020–2021	Red Star	12	(0)
2021–2025	Chambly	96	(2)
2025–	Lusitanos Saint-Maur	14	(0)

International career^{‡}
2021–	Benin	12	(0)
- * Club domestic league appearances and goals as of 7 February 2026 ‡ National team caps and goals as of 14 August 2023

Melvyn Doremus (born 29 October 1996) is a professional footballer who plays as a midfielder for Championnat National 1 club Lusitanos Saint-Maur. Born in France, he plays for the Benin national team.

== International career ==
Doremus was first called up to the Benin national team in November 2019 for a game against Sierra Leone, but did not play. He made his international debut on 2 September 2021 in a World Cup qualifier against Madagascar, a 1–0 away victory. He started and played the full game.
