= Chambéry Savoie Stadium =

Stadium in Chambéry, France

- Interactive map of Chambéry Savoie Stadium
- Location: Chambéry, Savoie, France
- Coordinates: 45.5735°N 5.9082°E
- Owner: Ville de Chambéry
- Capacity: 5,285
- Surface: Artificial turf

Construction
- Built: 2021-2023
- Opened: 2023

Tenants
- SO Chambérien Rugby; Chambéry SF

The Chambéry Savoie Stadium, formerly the Stade municipal, is a multi-purpose stadium in Chambéry, France. It is currently used for rugby union and football matches and is the home stadium of Stade Olympique Chambérien Rugby and Chambéry SF. It has a capacity of 5,285.
