= Chambéry SF =

Association football club in France

- Full name: Chambéry Savoie Football
- Founded: 1925 (as Chambéry Football Club); 2015 (as Chambéry Savoie Foot)
- Ground: Chambéry Savoie Stadium
- Capacity: 6,785 (5,285 seated)
- Chairman: Christophe Ruelle
- Manager: Hervé Yvars
- League: Régional 1 Group TBC
- 2024–25: National 3 Group I, 14th of 14 (relegated)
| Home colours | Away colours |

Chambéry Savoie Football is a French association football club based in Chambéry, the largest city in the Savoie department of France. The club was founded in 1925.

The club's current home stadium is the Chambéry Savoie Stadium. Built between 2021 and 2023, it officially opened on 29 September 2023 with a capacity of 6,785 spectators (5,285 seated).

As of the 2025–26 season, the club competes in Regional 1, the sixth division of French football, having been relegated from the Championnat National 3 at the end of the 2024–25 season.

== History ==
The club was founded in 1925 as Chambéry Football Club, but later merged with Chamberien Associate Sportif in 1942 to become Stade Olympique de Chambéry.

In the 2010–11 season, Chambéry became the first amateur club in Coupe de France history to defeat three Ligue 1 clubs (Monaco, Brest, Sochaux), before losing in the quarterfinals.

In 2015, following a liquidation event, the club was renamed to Chambéry Savoie Football.
