= Brahim Mahamat =

Chadian footballer (born 1995)

Personal information
- Full name: Brahim Mahamat Ahmat
- Date of birth: 13 November 1995 (age 31)
- Place of birth: N'Djamena, Chad
- Height: 1.84 m (6 ft 0 in)
- Position: Forward

Senior career*
Years	Team	Apps	(Gls)
2014–2015	AS Farcha		
2015–2016	Saint-Pierre-des-Corps		
2016–2017	Étoile Bleue Saint-Cyr-sur-Loire	5	(2)
2017–2018	Avoine	2	(0)
2018–2019	USP Joué-lès-Tours		
2019–2021	Tours	19	(6)
2021–2022	Bayonne	22	(16)
2022–2024	Alès	38	(13)
2024	Granville	2	(0)

International career^{‡}
2020–	Chad	6	(0)
- * Club domestic league appearances and goals as of 13 September 2024 ‡ National team caps and goals as of 20 November 2023

Brahim Mahamat Ahmat (Arabic: ابراهيم محمد احمد; born 13 November 1995) is a Chadian professional footballer who plays as a forward for the Chad national team.

== Honours ==
Tours

- Championnat National 3: 2019–20
