= Zana Allée =

Footballer (born 1994)

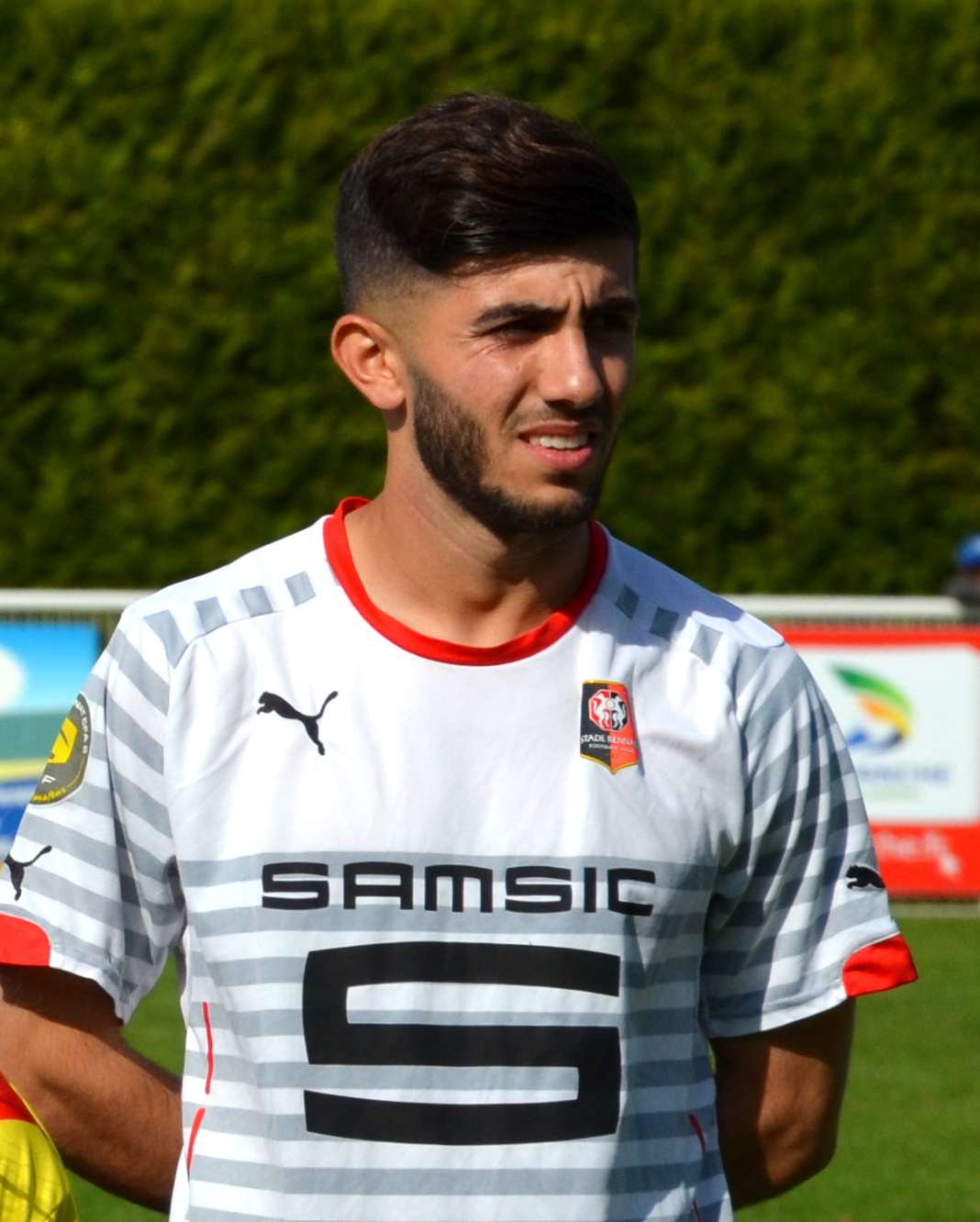
- Allée with Rennes B in May 2015

Personal information
- Birth name: Zana Ahmad Abas
- Date of birth: 1 March 1994 (age 32)
- Place of birth: Duhok, Iraq
- Height: 1.64 m (5 ft 5 in)
- Position: Striker

Team information
- Current team: Duhok
- Number: 25

Youth career
- 2001–2009: AS Ginglin Cesson
- 2009–2013: Rennes

Senior career*
Years	Team	Apps	(Gls)
2013–2015	Rennes B	46	(13)
2013–2014	Rennes	5	(0)
2014	→ Auxerre B (loan)	8	(1)
2014	→ Auxerre (loan)	1	(0)
2015–2016	Ajaccio	14	(0)
2015–2017	Ajaccio B	18	(2)
2017	Concarneau	17	(0)
2017–2021	Stade Briochin	91	(12)
2021–2022	Stade Briochin B	7	(0)
2022–2024	Rouen	44	(4)
2024–	Duhok	25	(2)

International career
2009–2010	France U16	8	(0)
2012	France U18	2	(0)
- * Club domestic league appearances and goals as of 14 February 2026

Zana Allée (Arabic: زانا علي, born 1 March 1994) is a professional footballer who plays as a midfielder for Iraq Stars League club Duhok SC. Born in Iraqi Kurdistan, he is a former France youth international.

== Early life ==
Allée was born Zana Ahmad Abas in Duhok, Iraq to Kurdish parents. He acquired French nationality on 23 March 2004, through the collective effect of his parents' naturalization, and legally changed his name to Zana Allée.

== Career ==
On 10 August 2013, Allée made his debut with Rennes's first team in a match against Reims. Rennes won the match 2–1 and Zana played 54 minutes.

On 4 August 2015, Allée joined Ajaccio on a two-year contract. Allée made no first team appearances in the second year of his Ajaccio contract, and left to join Concarneau in the January 2017 transfer window. He left at the end of the season, joining his brothers at Stade Briochin in November 2017.

In June 2022, Allée signed for Rouen.

In August 2024 Allée Signed for Duhok SC

== Personal life ==
Allée's two brothers, Dana and Ahmad, are also footballers.

== Career statistics ==
As of match played 11 February 2023

Appearances and goals by club, season and competition
Club	Season	League			National cup		League cup		Total	
Club	Season	Division	Apps	Goals	Apps	Goals	Apps	Goals	Apps	Goals
Rennes B	2012–13	CFA 2	11	3	—		—		11	3
Rennes B	2013–14	CFA 2	10	4	—		—		10	4
Rennes B	2014–15	CFA 2	25	6	—		—		25	6
Rennes B	Total		46	13	—		—		46	13
Rennes	2013–14	Ligue 1	5	0	0	0	1	0	6	0
Auxerre B (loan)	2013–14	CFA 2	8	1	—		—		8	1
Auxerre (loan)	2013–14	Ligue 2	1	0	0	0	0	0	1	0
Ajaccio	2015–16	Ligue 2	14	0	1	0	1	0	16	0
Ajaccio B	2015–16	CFA 2	13	1	—		—		13	1
Ajaccio B	2016–17	CFA 2	5	1	—		—		5	1
Ajaccio B	Total		18	2	—		—		18	2
Concarneau	2016–17	National	17	0	0	0	—		17	0
Stade Briochin	2017–18	National 2	15	4	4	1	—		19	5
Stade Briochin	2018–19	National 2	28	3	0	0	—		28	3
Stade Briochin	2019–20	National 2	20	2	3	0	—		23	2
Stade Briochin	2020–21	National	28	3	2	0	—		30	3
Stade Briochin	Total		91	12	9	1	—		100	13
Stade Briochin B	2021–22	National 3	7	0	—		—		7	0
Rouen	2022–23	National 2	18	2	0	0	—		18	2
Career total			225	30	10	1	2	0	237	31

== Honours ==
Duhok

- AGCFF Gulf Club Champions League: 2024–25
