= Yoann Beaka =

French footballer (born 2003)

Personal information
- Date of birth: 6 April 2003 (age 23)
- Place of birth: Paris, France
- Height: 1.94 m (6 ft 4 in)
- Position: Forward

Team information
- Current team: Bobigny-Bagnolet-Gagny

Youth career
- USF Trilport
- CS Meaux Academie
- Paris FC

Senior career*
Years	Team	Apps	(Gls)
2021–2022	Paris FC II	7	(6)
2021–2022	Paris FC	5	(0)
2022–2023	Troyes II	23	(4)
2023–2024	Romorantin	15	(4)
2024–2025	Beauvais	13	(3)
2025	Aubervilliers	14	(4)
2025	Stripfing	7	(0)
2025–	Bobigny-Bagnolet-Gagny	7	(1)
- * Club domestic league appearances and goals as of 17 May 2026

Yoann Beaka (born 6 April 2003) is a French professional footballer who plays for Bobigny-Bagnolet-Gagny.

== Club career ==
Yoann Beaka joined the Stade de Reims academy in 2017, from an amateur club of Trilport, after spending two years in the federal Pôle espoirs of Reims.

Having joined Paris FC under-19s during the 2021–22 season, Beaka was promoted to the reserve team in National 3 in 2022, where he quickly impressed with his attacking skills, scoring a hat-trick during a 6–2 win over FCM Aubervilliers.

Called to the first team in February 2022, he made his professional debut for Paris FC on the 5 March 2022, replacing Julien Lopez on the 73rd minute of a 1–1 away Ligue 2 draw to Nîmes.

== Personal life ==
Born in France, Beaka holds Ivorian nationality by descent.
