= Ahmad Allée =

Kurdish footballer (born 1996)

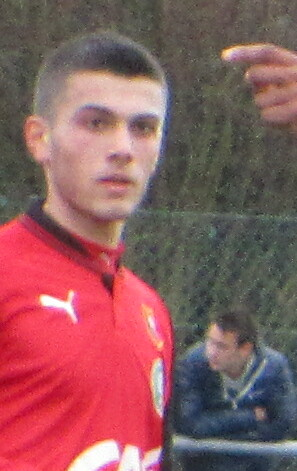
- Allée with Rennes B in February 2013

Personal information
- Birth name: Ahmad Adil Abbas
- Date of birth: 29 April 1996 (age 30)
- Place of birth: Duhok, Iraq
- Height: 1.72 m (5 ft 8 in)
- Position: Midfielder

Team information
- Current team: Duhok
- Number: 18

Youth career
- 2003–2011: AS Ginglin Cesson
- 2011–2013: Rennes

Senior career*
Years	Team	Apps	(Gls)
2013–2016	Rennes B	32	(4)
2016–2017	Saint-Étienne B	12	(0)
2017–2022	Stade Briochin	110	(12)
2020–2022	Stade Briochin B	5	(1)
2022–2023	Orléans B	6	(0)
2022–2023	Orléans	23	(0)
2023–2025	Rouen	48	(0)
2025–	Duhok	2	(0)

International career^{‡}
2014	France U18	1	(0)
2023–	Iraq	4	(0)
- * Club domestic league appearances and goals as of 25 October 2025 ‡ National team caps and goals as of 24 January 2024

Ahmad Adil Abbas (Arabic: أَحْمَد عَادِل عَبَّاس; born 29 April 1996), professionally known as Ahmad Allée (Arabic: أَحْمَد عَلِيّ), is an Iraqi footballer who plays as a midfielder for Duhok SC and the Iraq national team.

== Early life ==
Allée was born Ahmad Adil Abas in Duhok, Iraq, to Kurdish parents. He acquired French nationality on 23 March 2004, through the collective effect of his parents' naturalization, and legally changed his name to Ahmad Allée.

== Club career ==
In 2017, Allee signed for French fourth tier side Stade Briochin, helping them earn promotion to the French third tier and playing for the club for five seasons. In 2022, he signed for French third-tier side Orléans.

== International career ==
Allée is eligible to represent the Iraq national team internationally, having been born there and through his parents. He is a youth international for France, having played for the France U18s once in 2014 In October 2023, he was called up to the Iraq national team for the 2023 Jordan International Tournament.

== Style of play ==
Allée is known for his passing ability.

== Personal life ==
Allée is the brother of French footballer Zana Allée.

== Career statistics ==
=== Club ===
As of match played 7 January 2024

Appearances and goals by club, season and competition
Club	Season	League			National cup		Europe		Other		Total	
Club	Season	Division	Apps	Goals	Apps	Goals	Apps	Goals	Apps	Goals	Apps	Goals
Rennes II	2013–14	National 3	8	0	—		—		—		8	0
Rennes II	2014–15	National 3	11	0	—		—		—		11	0
Rennes II	2015–16	National 3	13	0	—		—		—		13	0
Rennes II	Total		32	0	—		—		—		32	0
Saint-Étienne II	2016–17	National 3	12	0	—		—		—		12	0
Saint-Étienne II	2017–18	National 3	0	0	—		—		—		0	0
Saint-Étienne II	Total		12	0	—		—		—		12	0
Stade Briochin	2017–18	CFA 2	18	0	4	0	—		—		22	0
Stade Briochin	2018–19	CFA 2	21	0	—		—		—		21	0
Stade Briochin	2019–20	CFA 2	16	2	3	0	—		—		19	2
Stade Briochin	2020–21	CFA	25	3	1	0	—		—		26	3
Stade Briochin	2021–22	CFA	30	7	0	0	—		—		30	7
Stade Briochin	Total		120	12	8	0	—		—		128	12
Stade Briochin II	2020–21	National 3	3	0	—		—		—		3	0
Stade Briochin II	2021–22	National 3	2	0	—		—		—		2	0
Stade Briochin II	Total		5	0	—		—		—		5	0
Orléans	2022–23	CFA	23	0	—		—		—		23	0
Orléans B	2022–23	National 3	6	0	—		—		—		6	0
Rouen	2023–24	CFA	13	0	3	0	—		—		16	0
Career total			201	12	11	0	0	0	0	0	212	12

=== International ===
As of match played 24 January 2024

Iraq
Year	Apps	Goals
2023	3	0
2024	1	0
Total	4	0
