= Abdoul Aziz Gassama =

French footballer (born 2003)

Personal information
- Date of birth: 3 May 2003 (age 23)
- Place of birth: L'Isle-d'Espagnac, France
- Position: Winger

Team information
- Current team: Bassin d'Arcachon

Senior career*
Years	Team	Apps	(Gls)
2020–2023	Châteauroux II	5	(0)
2021–2023	Châteauroux	1	(0)
2023–	Bassin d'Arcachon	0	(0)
- * Club domestic league appearances and goals as of 9 December 2024

Abdoul Aziz Gassama (born 3 May 2003) is a French professional footballer who plays as a winger for Championnat National 3 club Bassin d'Arcachon.

== Career ==
On 5 February 2019, Gassama signed an aspirant contract with Châteauroux. He made his senior debut with the club in a 2–1 Ligue 2 win over Troyes on 1 May 2021.
