= Adil Azbague =

Footballer (born 1995)

Personal information
- Full name: Adil Azbague
- Date of birth: 5 January 1995 (age 31)
- Place of birth: Bois-Bernard, France
- Height: 1.87 m (6 ft 2 in)
- Position: Midfielder

Team information
- Current team: Arras

Youth career
- 2012–2013: CS Avion
- 2013: Arras
- 2013–2015: Valenciennes

Senior career*
Years	Team	Apps	(Gls)
2014–2016	Valenciennes B	26	(2)
2015–2018	Valenciennes	25	(0)
2018–2019	Quevilly-Rouen	19	(0)
2018–2019	Quevilly-Rouen B	8	(0)
2019–2021	Chabab Mohammédia	20	(0)
2021	Ittihad Khemisset	1	(0)
2021–2023	Beauvais	42	(2)
2023–2024	Feignies Aulnoye	26	(0)
2024–	Arras		

International career
2016	Morocco U23	1	(0)
- * Club domestic league appearances and goals as of 07:49, 11 June 2024 (UTC)

Adil Azbague (born 6 January 1995) is a professional footballer who plays as a midfielder for Régional 1 club Arras. Born in France, he represented Morocco at youth international level.

== Club career ==
On 9 June 2024, Azbague signed for Régional 1 club Arras.

== International career ==
Azbague was born in France to Moroccan parents. He holds both French and Moroccan nationalities.

== International career ==
He was called up and capped for the Morocco U23s in a 1–0 friendly win against the Cameroon U23s.
