= Sofyane Bouzamoucha =

French footballer (born 2000)

Personal information
- Date of birth: 10 May 2000 (age 26)
- Place of birth: Trappes, France
- Height: 1.86 m (6 ft 1 in)
- Position: Centre-back

Team information
- Current team: Farul Constanța
- Number: 24

Youth career
- OFC Les Mureaux
- Poissy
- –2018: Paris Saint-Germain
- 2018–2019: Mantois

Senior career*
Years	Team	Apps	(Gls)
2019	Mantois	1	(0)
2019–2020	Orléans B	16	(1)
2020–2022	Orléans	1	(0)
2021–2022	→ Rouen (loan)	21	(2)
2022–2024	Rouen	49	(5)
2024–2025	Servette	0	(0)
2024	Servette U21	7	(0)
2025–2026	Rouen	44	(1)
2026–	Farul Constanța	13	(0)
- * Club domestic league appearances and goals as of 7 November 2026

Sofyane Bouzamoucha (Arabic: بوزاموشة سفيان; born 10 May 2000) is a French professional footballer who plays as a centre-back for Liga I club Farul Constanța.

== Career statistics ==
As of match played 7 November 2026

Appearances and goals by club, season and competition
Club	Season	League			National cup (Note: Includes Coupe de France, Cupa României)		Europe		Other		Total	
Club	Season	Division	Apps	Goals	Apps	Goals	Apps	Goals	Apps	Goals	Apps	Goals
Mantois	2018–19	Championnat National 2	1	0	–		–		–		10	0
Orléans B	2019–20	Championnat National 3	10	1	–		–		–		10	1
Orléans B	2020–21	Championnat National 3	6	0	–		–		–		6	0
Orléans B	Total		16	1	–		–		–		16	1
Orléans	2020–21	Championnat National	1	0	1	0	–		–		2	0
Rouen (loan)	2021–22	Championnat National 2	21	2	2	0	–		–		23	2
Rouen	2022–23	Championnat National 2	23	3	0	0	–		–		23	3
Rouen	2023–24	Championnat National	26	2	5	1	–		–		31	3
Rouen	Total		70	7	7	1	–		–		77	8
Servette	2024–25	Swiss Super League	0	0	0	0	0	0	–		0	0
Servette U21	2024–25	1. Liga	7	0	–		–		–		7	0
Rouen	2024–25	Championnat National	14	0	–		–		–		14	0
Rouen	2025–26	Championnat National	31	1	0	0	–		2 (Note: Appearances in Ligue 2 promotion/relegation play-offs)	0	33	1
Rouen	Total		44	1	0	0	–		2	0	46	1
Farul Constanța	2026–27	Liga I	13	0	1	0	–		–		14	0
Career Total			152	9	9	1	0	0	2	0	163	10

== Honours ==
Rouen

- Championnat National 2: 2022–23
