= Jules Meyer =

French footballer (born 2000)

Personal information
- Date of birth: 26 September 2000 (age 26)
- Place of birth: Saint-Priest-en-Jarez, France
- Height: 1.76 m (5 ft 9 in)
- Position: Midfielder

Team information
- Current team: CSKA 1948
- Number: 30

Youth career
- –2019: Le Puy-en-Velay

Senior career*
Years	Team	Apps	(Gls)
2019	Le Puy-en-Velay	0	(0)
2019–2021	Clermont Foot B	15	(1)
2021–2024	Le Puy-en-Velay	56	(6)
2024–2026	Dijon	24	(1)
2024	→ Dijon B (loan)	2	(0)
2025–2026	→ Bourg-Péronnas (loan)	27	(6)
2026–	CSKA 1948	10	(0)
- * Club domestic league appearances and goals as of 16 October 2026

Jules Meyer (born 26 September 2000) is a French professional footballer who plays as a midfielder for Bulgarian First League club CSKA 1948.

== Early life ==
Meyer was born on 26 September 2000. Born in France, he is a native of Loire-Atlantique, France.

== Career ==
During the summer of 2021, Meyer signed for French side Le Puy Foot 43 Auvergne, where he made fifty-six league appearances and scored six goals and helped the club achieve promotion from the fourth tier to the third tier.

Following his stint there, he signed for French side Dijon FCO, where he made twenty-four league appearances and scored one goal. One year later, he was sent on loan to French side Football Bourg-en-Bresse Péronnas 01, where he made twenty-seven league appearances and scored six goals. Ahead of the 2026–27 season, he signed for Bulgarian side CSKA 1948.
