= Gaëtan Deneuve =

French footballer (born 1985)

Personal information
- Full name: Gaëtan Deneuve
- Date of birth: 3 May 1985 (age 41)
- Place of birth: Harfleur, France
- Height: 1.83 m (6 ft 0 in)
- Position: Goalkeeper

Senior career*
| Years | Team | Apps | (Gls) |
| 2003–2004 | Le Havre | 0 | (0) |
| 2004–2007 | AS Cherbourg | 53 | (0) |
| 2007–2010 | Châteauroux | 39 | (0) |
| 2010–2011 | Stade Brest | 0 | (0) |
| 2011–2017 | Fréjus Saint-Raphaël | 155 | (0) |
| 2017–2018 | Bourg-en-Bresse | 21 | (0) |
- * Club domestic league appearances and goals as of 09:39, 19 August 2018 (UTC)

Gaëtan Deneuve (born 3 May 1985) is a French football goalkeeper.

== Career ==
In June 2017, Deneuve signed with Football Bourg-en-Bresse Péronnas 01. He became a referee during the 2018-2019 season.
