= Vincent Pirès =

French footballer (born 1995)

Personal information
- Date of birth: 17 November 1995 (age 30)
- Place of birth: Paris, France
- Height: 1.82 m (6 ft 0 in)
- Position: Midfielder

Team information
- Current team: Nîmes
- Number: 5

Senior career*
Years	Team	Apps	(Gls)
2014–2016	Paris FC B	54	(6)
2015–2016	Paris FC	3	(0)
2016–2017	Auxerre B	12	(0)
2017	Lusitanos Saint-Maur	6	(0)
2017–2018	Boulogne-Billancourt	22	(4)
2018–2020	Entente SSG	40	(1)
2020–2021	Louhans-Cuiseaux	7	(1)
2021–2023	Sedan	59	(4)
2023–2025	Châteauroux	51	(2)
2025–	Nîmes	14	(1)
- * Club domestic league appearances and goals as of 7 February 2026

Vincent Pirès (born 17 November 1995) is a French professional footballer who plays as a midfielder for Championnat National 1 club Nîmes.

== Club career ==
On 29 May 2021, Pirès signed with Sedan.

On 13 July 2023, Pirès signed a contract with Châteauroux.

== Personal life ==
Pirès was born in France to a Portuguese father, and an Algerian mother. He holds Algerian nationality, and showed a preference to representing Algeria internationally.
