= Marco Essimi =

Cameroonian footballer

Personal information
- Full name: Marco Rachid Essimi Ateba
- Date of birth: 18 February 1999 (age 27)
- Place of birth: Yaoundé, Cameroon
- Height: 1.82 m (6 ft 0 in)
- Position: Winger

Team information
- Current team: Rodez
- Number: 27

Youth career
- Le Blanc-Mesnil
- 2017–2018: Paris FC

Senior career*
Years	Team	Apps	(Gls)
2018	Paris FC II	4	(1)
2018–2019	Dijon II	24	(6)
2019–2020	Paris FC II	15	(8)
2020–2021	Saint-Malo	2	(0)
2021	Paris 13 Atletico	0	(0)
2021	FC 93	4	(0)
2021–2022	Chantilly	10	(0)
2022–2023	Jura Dolois	23	(3)
2023–2024	Saint-Priest	25	(12)
2024–2026	Dunkerque	31	(6)
2026	Alverca	4	(0)
2026–	Rodez	0	(0)
- * Club domestic league appearances and goals as of 5 September 2026

Marco Rachid Essimi Ateba (born 18 February 1999) is a Cameroonian professional footballer who plays as a winger for Ligue 2 club Rodez.

== Club career ==
Essimi is a product of the youth academies of the French clubs Le Blanc-Mesnil and Paris FC. He began his senior career with Paris FC's reserves in the Championnat National 3 in 2018, before a stint with Dijon's reserves. On 24 June 2019, he signed his first professional contract with Paris FC. On 6 October 2020, he transferred to Saint-Malo. In February 2021, he moved to Paris 13 Atletico for the second half of the 2021–2022 season, before a short stint with FC 93. In the summer of 2021 he moved to Chantilly, and the following season to Jura Dolois. He spent the 2023–24 season with Saint-Priest where he was one of the top scorers in the Championnat National 3. On 16 June 2024, he signed a professional contract with Ligue 2 side Dunkerque for 2 seasons, after 6 years of semi-pro football.

On 25 June 2026, Essimi signed with Alverca in the Portuguese top tier. After four appearances for Alverca, on 2 September 2026 he returned to France and signed a three-season contract with Ligue 2 club Rodez.
