= Entente SSG =

Football club based in Saint-Gratien, France

- Full name: Entente Sannois Saint-Gratien
- Nickname: L'Entente
- Founded: 1 June 1989; 37 years ago
- Ground: Parc des Sports Michel Hidalgo; Saint-Gratien
- Capacity: 8,000
- Chairman: Didier Caignard
- Head Coach: Jimmy Modeste
- League: Régional 1
- 2024–25: National 3 Group E, 12th of 14
- Website: entente-ssg.footeo.com
Home colours	Away colours

The Entente Sannois Saint-Gratien is a French association football team based in the suburb of Saint-Gratien in Paris. The team was founded in 1989 and play in the Régional 1, the country's sixth tier of competition.

== Recent history ==
Recent seasons have seen the team struggle, both on and off the pitch. Following many years in the French 3rd division during which time they were denied promotion to Ligue 2 by an administrative error at the league in the mid-2000s (for which they were awarded financial compensation), they were relegated at the end of the 2008–09 season and started season 2009–10 in the Championnat de France Amateur. In June 2011, L'Entente was relegated again (this time to the CFA 2), after the club entered bankruptcy protection. With promotions in 2014 and 2017, the club rose again to the third tier, but suffered relegations again in 2019 and 2022.

=== Chairmen ===
- 2009–2011: Vikash Dhorasoo
- 2011–2013: Patrick Gangloff
- 2013–2018: Christian Fouché
- 2018–2019: Patrick Gangloff

=== Stadium ===
The team play their home games at the Parc des Sports Michel Hidalgo, located on the border between the Sannois and Saint-Gratien suburbs of Paris. Though the stadium has a capacity of just under 8000, the average attendances for Entente matches is considerably lower than this, and has been declining with the team's fortunes over the last few years.

== Current squad ==
As of 15 February 2019

Note: Flags indicate national team as defined under FIFA eligibility rules; some limited exceptions apply. Players may hold more than one non-FIFA nationality.

No.	Pos.	Nation	Player
1	GK	FRA	Ciré N'Dongo
5	DF	FRA	Vincent Pirès
6	DF	GUI	Aboubacar Magnora
8	MF	FRA	Benjamin Irie Bi
9	FW	FRA	Bafodé Dramé
10	FW	FRA	Simon Dia
11	MF	FRA	Rosario Latouchent
13	FW	FRA	Abdourahamane Baldé
14	FW	FRA	Jonathan N'Sondé
15	FW	SEN	Elhadji Badiane Sidibe
17	MF	FRA	Christophe Rodrigues Silva

No.	Pos.	Nation	Player
18	MF	FRA	Mathieu Géran
19	DF	FRA	Jérémy Labor
20	DF	FRA	Anthony Menard
22	MF	BEN	Melvyn Doremus
23	DF	FRA	Hamidou Ba
26	MF	FRA	Madih Talal (on loan from Amiens)
27	MF	FRA	Kapokyeng Sylva
28	MF	SEN	El Hadji Dieye
29	DF	FRA	Rayan Souici (on loan from Saint-Étienne)
30	GK	SMN	Sébastien Raphose
40	GK	FRA	Mickaël Salamone

== Famous players ==
- (France) Obed Nkambadio (youth)
- (France) Serge-Philippe Raux-Yao (youth)
- (France) Alan Virginius (youth)

== Coaches ==
- Didier Caignard (1997 – October 2005)
- Laurent Croci (October 2005 – May 2006)
- Kamel Djabour (June 2006)
- Julio Moreno (Juni 2006 – January 2007)
- Kamel Djabour (January 2007 June 2009)
- Adrian Suka (June 2009 – 2011)
- Vincent Bordot (2011)
- Bruno Naidon (2012)
- Philippe Araujo (2012)
- Vincent Bordot (2013–)
