= US Laon =

French football club

Union Sportive Laonnaise is a French association football team founded in 1947. They are based in Laon, France and are currently playing in the Championnat de France Amateurs 2 Group A, the fifth tier in the French football league system. They play at the Stade Marcel Levindrey in Laon.
