= 2015–16 Coupe de France preliminary rounds =

2015–16 Coupe de France
Coupe Charles Simon

Tournament details
- Country: France

The 2015–16 Coupe de France preliminary rounds made up the qualifying competition to decide which teams took part in the main competition from Round 7. This was the 99th season of the most prestigious football cup competition of France. The competition was organised by the French Football Federation (FFF) and open to all clubs in French football, as well as clubs from the overseas departments and territories (Guadeloupe, French Guiana, Martinique, Mayotte, New Caledonia (qualification via 2015 New Caledonia Cup), Tahiti (qualification via 2015 Tahiti Cup), Réunion, and Saint Martin).

The qualifying rounds took place between March and October 2015.

== Teams ==
=== Round 1 to 6 ===
The first six rounds and preliminaries were organised by the Regional Leagues and the Overseas Territories, which allow teams from within their league structure to enter at any point up to the third round. Teams from CFA 2 enter at the third round, those from CFA enter at the fourth round and those from Championnat National enter at the fifth round. Teams entering in each round, by region:

Region	Prelim.	First	Second	Third	Fourth	Fifth
Alsace		386	11	30	2	2
Aquitaine		202	37	15	6	0
Atlantique		324	38	14	3	2
Auvergne		236	4	13	3	0
Lower Normandy		178	25	3	0	1
Bourgogne		40	76	14	1	0
Brittany		554	125	15	4	0
Centre-Val de Loire	44	174	0	5	1	2
Centre-West		268	22	18	0	0
Champagne-Ardenne		152	16	14	0	1
Corsica				28	0	1
Franche-Comté		150	3	3	1	1
Languedoc-Roussillon		204	38	4	1	1
Lorraine			14	117	0	1
Maine		144	18	3	0	0
Méditerranée		178	27	4	5	2
Midi-Pyrénées				86	5	0
Nord-Pas de Calais		544	74	19	4	2
Normandie		128	50	3	2	0
Paris Île-de-France				144	16	0
Picardie			168	14	3	2
Rhône-Alpes		570	15	66	4	0

== Preliminary round ==
=== Centre-Val de Loire ===
These matches were played on 23 August 2015.

Preliminary round results: Centre-Val de Loire

Tie no	Home team (tier)	Score	Away team (tier)
1.	Avenir St Amand Longpre	1-3	CS Bonneval
2.	FC du Haut Vendomis	3-0 w/o	Avant Garde Checy Mardie Bou
3.	FC Mandorais	0-3 w/o	FC Leves
4.	Auneau FC	1-3	Foyeur J Champhol
5.	FCO St Jean De La Ruelle	4-2 (a.e.t.)	US Municipale St Denis En Val
6.	C Deport Espagnol Orleans	3-0 w/o	FC Luce Ouest
7.	Sp C Massay	1-0	Sports et Loisirs de Chaillot
8.	AS Nouan-Lamotte	3-0	Jargeau St Denis FC
9.	Santranges FC	4-2	US Briare
10.	Cercle Laique Bonny Sur Loire	2-1	St Savigny En Sancerre
11.	AS Arthon	0-3 w/o	Avenir Lignieres
12.	Stade S Cluis	6-4	FC Canton Le Chatele - Ids St Roch
13.	US St Florent Sur Cher	4-0	Foyeur Rural de Velles
14.	Avenir C St Aout	1-3	US Chateaumeillant
15.	Etoile S Villefranche Sur Cher	2-3	Entente S Veretz Larcay
16.	Amicale de la Jeunesse St Romanaise	2-5	AC Villers Les Ormes
17.	Sp C Vatan	5-0	Aube S Esvres Sur Indre
18.	US Chemery Mehers St Romain	3-1	Etoile Chateauroux
19.	FC Ste Maure-Maille	1-0	Entente S Bourgueil
20.	Entente S St Benoit La Foret	3-1	Etoile S de Villaines Les Rochers
21.	US Argy	0-3	FC du Val de Vienne
22.	J Amicale S Moulins Sur Cephons	1-0	Entente SJ La Celle St Avant

== First round ==
=== Mayotte ===
These matches were played on 7 March 2015.

First round results: Mayotte

Tie no	Home team (tier)	Score	Away team (tier)
1.	(Mayotte) Feu Du Centre De M Roile	1–0	USCP Antéou (Mayotte)
2.	(Mayotte) ASDE Kawéni	1–2	Voulvavi Sports (Mayotte)
3.	(Mayotte) FC Shingabwé	3–8	Flamme Hajangoua (Mayotte)
4.	(Mayotte) ASJ Moinatrindri	3–0	Missil Rouge (Mayotte)
5.	(Mayotte) Bandrélé foot IV	4–1	Mtsanga 2000 (Mayotte)
6.	(Mayotte) FC Dembéni	2–1	CS Mramadoudou (Mayotte)
7.	(Mayotte) USC Labattoir	2–2 (5–3 p)	US Ouangani (Mayotte)
8.	(Mayotte) VSS Hagnoundrou	1–2	FC Chiconi (Mayotte)
9.	Enfants de Mayotte	4–5	AS Sada (Mayotte)
10.	(Mayotte) AS Rosador	4–0	FC Labattoir (Mayotte)
11.	(Mayotte) TCO Mamoudzou	1–2	RC Barakani (Mayotte)
12.	(Mayotte) UCS Sada	1–0	FC Koropa (Mayotte)
13.	(Mayotte) US Mtsangamboua	3–0	Choungui FC (Mayotte)
14.	(Mayotte) Étoile Hapandzo	1–3	US Mtsamoudou (Mayotte)

=== Guadeloupe ===
These matches were played on 21, 22, 23 and 29 August 2015.

First round results: Guadeloupe

Tie no	Home team (tier)	Score	Away team (tier)
1.	(Guadeloupe) U. Artistes du Raizet	2–0	St Lamentinois (Guadeloupe)
2.	(Collectivity of Saint Martin) FC Marigot (Saint Martin)	0–1	AS Le Moule (Guadeloupe)
3.	(Guadeloupe) US Grande Bourgeoise	2–1	A.J.S. Saintoise (Guadeloupe)
4.	(Guadeloupe) AS Le Gosier	2–3	Juvenis (Guadeloupe)
5.	(Guadeloupe) Dynamo Le Moule	0–4	La Frégate (Guadeloupe)
6.	(Guadeloupe) Cactus Sainte Anne	6–2	L'Éclair (Guadeloupe)
7.	(Guadeloupe) U.S. Ansoise	0–2	AV. Saint Rosien (Guadeloupe)

Tie no	Home team (tier)	Score	Away team (tier)
8.	(Guadeloupe) Rapid Club	3–4	A.S Nenuphars (Guadeloupe)
9.	(Guadeloupe) CS Bouillantais	2–1	SC Baie-Mahault (Guadeloupe)
10.	(Guadeloupe) CS Saint-François	3–0	JTR Trois Rivières (Guadeloupe)
11.	(Guadeloupe) L'Etoile de l'Ouest	0–3	Mondial Club (Guadeloupe)
12.	(Guadeloupe) Saint-Claude FC	3–2	S.L.A.C. Mg (Guadeloupe)
13.	(Guadeloupe) Étoile Filante	1–4	An Jeunesse Evolution (Guadeloupe)

=== Réunion ===
These matches were played on 21 and 22 March 2015.

First round results: Réunion

Tie no	Home team (tier)	Score	Away team (tier)
1.	(Réunion) AS Guillaume	3–2	AS Du Plate (Réunion)
2.	(Réunion) ES Suzanne Bagatelle	6–3	JS Cressonnière (Réunion)
3.	(Réunion) CS St-Gilles	4–3	JSB 2007 (Réunion)
4.	(Réunion) Tampon FC	4–0	SS Rivière Sport (Réunion)
5.	(Réunion) AS Montgaillard	2–3	La Tamponnaise (Réunion)
6.	(Réunion) AJ Ligne Bambous	1–0	FC Moufia (Réunion)
7.	(Réunion) AETFC Etang St-Leu	6–0	CS Saint-André (Réunion)
8.	(Réunion) AS Eperon	4–1	SS Charles de Foucauld (Réunion)
9.	(Réunion) AS Poudriere	2–2 (4–3 p)	CS Dynamo (Réunion)
10.	(Réunion) AFC Halte-La	1–0	Ravine Blanche Club (Réunion)

=== Alsace ===
These matches were played on 15, 16, 18, 19 and 20 August 2015.

First round results: Alsace

Tie no	Home team (tier)	Score	Away team (tier)
1.	AS Cleebourg Bremmelbach	1–6	US Preuschdorf
2.	FC Entzheim	3–1	ALFC Duttlenheim
3.	FR Sessenheim-Stattmatten	0–2	US Turcs Bischwiller
4.	FC Oltingue	4–0	AS Hagenbach-Buethwiller
5.	FC Intercommunal Riquewihr et Environs	0–7	FC Ostheim
6.	AS Vallée Noble	0–6	AGIIR Florival
7.	FC 1935 Soufflenheim	5–0	ES Offendorf
8.	RC 1922 Kintzheim	2–1	AS Portugais Selestat
9.	US Scherwiller	1–2	AS Hohwarth St Pierre Bois
10.	FC 1920 Wissembourg	5–3	FC Niederroedern
11.	S Reunis Cernay	0–3	FC 1926 Pfastatt
12.	AS Altorf	0–1	AS Mutzig
13.	FC Balbronn	0–5	FC Lampertheim
14.	STE S. Beinheim	2–3	US Schleithal
15.	Cerc S St Etienne Wolxheim	2–4	Cercle S Bernardswiller
16.	ASLC Berstett	0–11	FC Breuschwickersheim
17.	ASC Blaesheim	3–0	FC Wangen Westhoffen
18.	FC Boersch	1–1 (5–3 p)	US Dambach-la-Ville
19.	FC Boofzheim	1–3	US Baldenheim
20.	ASC Brotsch Haegen Reinhardm	0–1	FC Dossenheim s/zinsel
21.	FA Bruche Barembach	1–2	FC Haslach
22.	STE S. Brumath	0–1	FC Marlenheim Kirchheim
23.	AS Chatenois	1–2	FC Krautergersheim
24.	US Dachstein	1–3	Etoile Bleue Achenheim
25.	US Dalhunden	0–19	FC Soultz ss/forets
26.	FC Dangolsheim	0–2	AS Willgottheim
27.	FC Dauendorf	2–1	SC Dettwiller
28.	AS Dingsheim-Griesheim 1920	0–8	F.C Dahlenheim
29.	Ent Drachenbronn Birlenbach	1–5	SC Roppenheim
30.	FC Ebersmunster 93	2–6	AS Mussig
31.	FC Eckbolsheim	2–2 (4–2 p)	AS Hoerdt
32.	US Eckwersheim	2–3	S Reunis Furdenheim
33.	A.S. Elsenheim	1–2	SC Sélestat
34.	UJ Section F. Epfig	2–2 (2–3 p)	OC Lipsheim
35.	AS Forstfeld	1–3	FC Bischwiller
36.	AS Gerstheim	2–1	AS Holtzheim
37.	FC Geudertheim	2–1	Excelsior Kaltenhouse
38.	FC Gries	0–4	S.C. Roeschwoog
39.	Fatih-Sport Haguenau	2–3	FC Eschbach
40.	CS Interc Ent Harskirchen	4–0	US Ettendorf
41.	AS Hatten	3–1	FC Mothern
42.	FC Herbsheim	1–2	FC Ostwald
43.	FC Herrlisheim	2–4	AS Hunspach
44.	FC Hoffen	2–0	A.S Reichstett
45.	A.S. Hohengoeft	3–4	FC Niederhausbergen
46.	Huttenheim US	3–4	FC Bindernheim
47.	FC Kindwiller	1–3	AS Ohlungen
48.	FC Kertzfeld	2–7	FC Krafft
49.	FC Lampertsloch-Merkwiller	0–1	AS. Betschdorf
50.	FC Langensoultzbach	1–2	AS de Laubach
51.	A.S. Lembach	0–3	U.S. Gumbrechtshoffen
52.	CS Lièpvre	0–3	Cerc S Fegersheim
53.	FC Lingolsheim	2–5	S Reunis Hoenheim
54.	AS Lupstein	0–4	FC Marmoutier
55.	FC Mackwiller	1–2	FC Phalsbourg
56.	AS Marckolsheim	4–3	AS Schoenau
57.	US Mommenheim	0–2	ASL Duntzenheim
58.	ES Morsbronn-les-Bains	0–4	AS Mertzwiller
59.	FC Mulhausen	1–4	FC Durrenbach
60.	AS Mundolsheim	3–1	FC Monswiller
61.	AS Natzwiller	1–3	US Innenheim
62.	FC Neewiller	0–2	S Reunis Rountzenheim Auenheim
63.	US Niederbronn-les-Bains	4–0	ASL Hegeney
64.	AS Niedernai	0–3	AS Sermersheim
65.	FC Niederschaeffolsheim	0–0 (3–2 p)	Fc Niederlauterbach
66.	A.S Nordheim Kuttolsheim	0–7	AS Bischoffsheim
67.	US Nordhouse	0–1	FC Matzenheim
68.	FC Oberhoffen	4–0	A.S. St. Barthelemy Leutenheim
69.	AS Offwiller	0–3	AS Gambsheim
70.	AS Osthouse	0–2	FC Hessenheim
71.	US Oberschaeffolsheim	2–0	AS Pfulgriesheim
72.	CA Plobsheim	1–2	ES Stotzheim
73.	ASC Portugais Val De La Bruche	4–1	USL Duppigheim
74.	AS du Rehthal	2–8	AS Wahlenheim-Bernolsheim
75.	AS Uhrwiller	4–0	FCE Reichshoffen
76.	FC Ringendorf	1–9	AS Ingwiller
77.	FC Rosheim	0–6	F.C. Still 1930
78.	AS Saint Etienne Salmbach	0–1	La Wantzenau FC
79.	FC Sand	3–1	FC Kogenheim
80.	AS Sarrewerden	1–3	FC Oermingen
81.	FC Schaffhouse/Zorn	1–2	US Section F. Bouxwiller
82.	FC Ecrivains Schiltigheim-Bisch	1–1 (5–3 p)	ASPTT Strasbourg
83.	ASB Schirmeck La Broque	5–1	FC Grendelbruch
84.	AS Schoenenbourg	2–1	FC Altenstadt
85.	FC 1920 Schweighouse S/Moder	3–2 (a.e.t.)	FC Souffelweyersheim
86.	FC Schwenheim	0–1	AS Wingen s/Moder
87.	AS Seebach	4–0	SC Rittershoffen
88.	C.S Sainte Croix aux Mines	2–1	AS Heiligenstein
89.	FC 1924 Steinbourg	0–7	FC Keskastel
90.	AS Educative Cite De L Ill	1–3 (a.e.t.)	FC Eschau
91.	FC Egalite Strasbourg	0–11	A Pop Joie et Sante Strasbourg
92.	AS Electricite Strasbourg	2–5	CS Mars Bischheim
93.	FC Strasbourg Koenigshoffen 06	1–2	AS Menora Strasbourg
94.	CS Hautepierre Strasbourg	0–3	AS Neudorf 1925
95.	FC Montagne Verte Strasbourg	0–3	AS Strasbourg
96.	A.S. Musau Strasbourg	1–5	FC Stockfeld Colombes

Tie no	Home team (tier)	Score	Away team (tier)
97.	SPC Red Star Strasbourg	2–3	CS Neuhof Strasbourg
98.	SOAS Robertsau	1–3	SUC Strasbourg
99.	US Surbourg	1–5	AS Kilstett
100.	US Trois Maisons	0–2	CS Waldhambach
101.	SPC Urmatt	1–2	US Hangenbieten
102.	FA Val de Moder	3–0	FC Lixhausen
103.	FC Valff	2–4	FC Rhinau
104.	AS Ville 2010	4–7	S Reunis Dorlisheim'
105.	AS Weinbourg	1–2	FC Ernolsheim les Saverne
106.	FC Weislingen	3–1	FC Schwindratzheim
107.	FC Weitbruch	1–2	AS Lauterbourg
108.	AS Weiterswiller	1–5	AS Weyer
109.	AS Westhouse	5–1	US Sundhouse
110.	U.S. Wimmenau	1–4	US Imbsheim
111.	FC Wingersheim	1–2 (a.e.t.)	AS Bergbieten
112.	A.S Wisches-Russ	0–0 (5–6 p)	FC Oberhausbergen
113.	US Wittersheim	1–3	FC Drusenheim
114.	FC Wittisheim	2–0	FC Barr
115.	Etoile Sportive Wolfisheim	1–6	FC Quatzenheim
116.	S Reunis Zellwiller	0–3	US Hindisheim
117.	Olympique Zinswiller	1–0	US Mietesheim
118.	US Artzenheim	0–3	FC Rouffach
119.	AS Aspach-le-Haut	6–1	FC.Buhl
120.	FC Bartenheim	0–1	AS Huningue 1919
121.	A.S Blodelsheim	1–2	ALSC Rumersheim
122.	AS Canton Vert	4–2	AS Wintzenheim
123.	FC Franco Portugais Cernay	3–1	AS Red Star Mulhouse
124.	AS Mahorais de Colmar	2–1	S Reunis Bergheim
125.	Colmar UnifiÉ F.C.	3–2	Olympique Colmar
126.	AS Didenheim	2–6	AS Lutterbach
127.	AS Durmenach	0–3	FC Montreux-Sports
128.	FC Ensisheim	0–3	FC Horbourg-Wihr
129.	FC Fessenheim	1–0	FC Bantzenheim
130.	F.C Grentzingen	0–1	AS Altkirch
131.	FC Grussenheim	5–0	FC Wettolsheim
132.	AS Guewenheim	2–3	'FC Village Neuf
133.	FC Gundolsheim	5–4 (a.e.t.)	AS Turckheim
134.	US Gunsbach - Zimmerbach	2–1	AS Saint-Hippolyte
135.	AS Hattstatt	0–3	FCAM Portugais Colmar
136.	AS Hausgauen	1–4	US Hirsingue
137.	FC Heiteren	0–2	FC Ingersheim
138.	AS Herrlisheim	0–4	SC Cernay
139.	US Hesingue	3–1	FC Morschwiller le bas 1940
140.	AS Hochstatt	2–1	S. Réunis Saint-Amarin
141.	AS Rixheim Ile Napoléon	0–1	FC Merxheim
142.	FC Illfurth	7–1	FC Sausheim
143.	F Reuni Jebsheim Muntzenheim	0–3	FC Oberhergheim
144.	FC Kappelen	5–1	AS Wittersdorf
145.	FC Roderen	7–1	FC Masevaux 1915
146.	AS Mertzen	4–4 (3–1 p)	AS Raedersdorf
147.	FC Meyenheim	3–2	AS Guémar
148.	FC Muespach	1–4	FC Steinbrunn Le Bas
149.	AM. des Mulhouse Antillais	4–4 (4–5 p)	FC Réguisheim
150.	ASPTT Mulhouse	3–0	AS Coteaux Mulhouse
151.	US Azzurri Mulhouse	1–3	FC Habsheim
152.	Etoile Mulhouse	2–3	FC Baldersheim
153.	A Des Portugais Region Mulhouse	0–7	FC Feldkirch
154.	FC Munchhouse	2–1	FC Wintzfelden Osenbach 06
155.	AS 1921 Munster	1–2	AS Andolsheim
156.	FC Niederhergheim	3–2	US Colmar
157.	AS Niffer	2–3	AS Bourgfelden Saint-Louis
158.	US Oberbruck-Dolleren	1–1 (5–4 p)	Brunstatt FC
159.	FC Obermorschwiller	1–5	AS Blotzheim
160.	AS Ober-Niederentzen	2–6	FC Bennwihr
161.	US Pfetterhouse	2–2 (4–3 p)	AS Riespach
162.	US Pulversheim FC	0–2	Mouloudia C De Mulhouse
163.	AS Ribeauvillé	4–2	FC Sainte Croix en Plaine
164.	AS Rixheim	3–3 (6–7 p)	RC Dannemarie
165.	FC Rosenau	4–0	FC Bisel
166.	AS Schlierbach	0–1	Ste S Zillisheim
167.	FC Sentheim	2–6	Real Mulhouse CF
168.	FC Seppois 1923	1–2 (a.e.t.)	AS Burnhaupt-le-Bas
169.	AS Sigolsheim	8–0	Section S Espagnols Colmar
170.	FC Soultz 1919	0–3	CS Mulhouse Bourtzwiller F
171.	US Thann	1–0	ASCA Wittelsheim
172.	FC Traubach	0–4	FC Folgensbourg
173.	As Ueberstrass Largitzen	0–3	FC Ballersdorf
174.	FC Uffheim	6–1	RC Mulhouse
175.	FC Ungersheim	1–4	FC Riedisheim
176.	FC Walheim	0–0 (10–9 p)	AS Waldighoffen
177.	S Reunis Widensolen	1–2	AS Pfaffenheim
178.	Es Wihr Au Val	3–5	S Reunis Kaysersberg
179.	FC Willer sur Thur	3–2 (a.e.t.)	FC Blue Star Reiningue
180.	FC Wolfgantzen	0–7	FC Hirtzfelden
181.	US Zimmersheim Eschentzwiller	0–10	ASB Vieux Thann
182.	FC Rossfeld	7–0	FC Artolsheim
183.	FC Dambach Neunhoffen	3–1	A. Copains Hinterfeld
184.	FC Hilsenheim	2–7	SC Ebersheim
185.	FC Oberroedern/Aschbach	1–2	AS Platania Gundershoffen
186.	FC Rohrwiller	3–0	Olympique Schaffhouse
187.	FC Scheibenhard	1–3	FC Riedseltz
188.	FC Red Star Richwiller	4–1	FC Battenheim
189.	FC Alteckendorf	0–4	US Ittenheim
190.	AS Hochfelden	3–1	U.S. Diemeringen-Voellerding. 94
191.	FC Schnersheim	1–2	Et. S Romanswiller
192.	SC Ottmarsheim	3–2	AS Durlinsdorf
193.	FC Truchtersheim	2–1	ES Pfettisheim Berstett

=== Aquitaine ===
These matches were played on 29 and 30 August 2015.

First round results: Aquitaine

Tie no	Home team (tier)	Score	Away team (tier)
1.	ES Montoise	4-3 (a.e.t.)	SPC St Pierre Du Mont
2.	JS Rionnaise F	1-0	FC Arengosse
3.	Gars d'Albret de Labrit	3-2 (a.e.t.)	Pardies Olympique
4.	RC De Dax	1-0	Peyrehorade S Section F
5.	Carresse Salies FC	1-3	SASS
6.	Chalosse FC	1-3	Entoile Haut Bearn
7.	ETS Pyreneenne	1-4	US Castétis-Gouze
8.	St Ygossais	0-1	AST Laurent Billere
9.	Pau JAB	3-0	US Roquefortoise
10.	US St Michel Arudy	5-2	CAM Morcenais
11.	US Laluquoise	1-5	SA Mauleonais
12.	Ardanavy FC	0-3	El Boucalais
13.	AS Des Eglantins D Hendaye	1-3	Labenne OSC
14.	AS Bretagne de Marsan	1-3	FC Lescarien
15.	Marensin FC	4-6	AS Artix
16.	Arbona FC	1-2 (a.e.t.)	Hasparren FC
17.	Les Labourdins d'Ustaritz	4-4 (4-5 p)	AS Tarnos dite Federative
18.	SPC Taron Sevignacq	1-0	AS De Siros
19.	AS Pontoise	5-2	FC Du Born
20.	US Nord Gironde	7-2	ES Cours-de-Pile
21.	Entente Grignols Villamblard	2-2 (4-5 p)	US Mussidan St Médard
22.	US Lagorce	0-4	Les Aiglons Razacois
23.	Les Dragons Astériens de la JSA foot	0-3	AS Coqs Rouges
24.	AS Pays de Montaigne et Gurçon	1-2	FC Loubesien
25.	US Creysse Lembras St Sauveur Lamonzie Montastruc	2-3	AS Marcellus Cocumont
26.	FC Cubnezais	1-4	AS Segonzac St Aquilin
27.	CS Teuillacais	0-4	US Galgonaise
28.	AS Bourgeais	3-0	Montpon Menesplet FC
29.	FC St Laurent d'Arce/St Gervais	6-1	Saint Aulaye Sports
30.	St Maurinois FC	1-1 (2-4 p)	AS Villandraut Préchac
31.	Tonneins FC	2-0	Passage FC
32.	Confluent F47	5-3	SC Cabanac Villagrain
33.	La Joyeuse De Savignac	4-1	CA Grignolais
34.	Entente Boé Bon Encontre	7-0	US Lamothe Mongauzy
35.	SC Astaffort	1-5	Colayrac FC
36.	Patronage Bazadais	1-3	FC Gironde La Réole
37.	Entente Sportive Mazeres Roaillan	6-1	Sud-Gironde FC
38.	CA Pondaurat	4-2	AS Sauveterrienne
39.	US St Pierre De Mons	1-2	SC St Symphorien
40.	US St Denis de Pile	4-2	AS Pugnacaise
41.	Stade Blayais	0-14	AS Antonne Le Change
42.	US Tocane	3-1	Périgueux Foot
43.	JS Corgnac	0-4	AS Rouffignac Plazac
44.	Limens FC	0-1	US Cenon Rive Droite
45.	AS Lavergne Miramont	2-1	FC Côteaux Bordelais
46.	FC Pays de Mareuil	8-2	AS Du Pays Granitique
47.	US Coutras	1-2	AvF Casseneuil Pailloles Ledat 47
48.	JS Bersonnaise	2-4	JS Castellevequois
49.	CA Brantomois	2-1	FC St André de Cubzac
50.	FC La Menaurie	1-3	AS Gensac-Montcaret

Tie no	Home team (tier)	Score	Away team (tier)
51.	JS St-Christophe-de-Double	0-1	AS Portugaise de Sarlat
52.	Saint-Seurin Junior Club	0-3 w/o	ES Boulazac
53.	ES Montignacoise	3-3 (5-6 p)	FA Pays Foyen
54.	ASSA Pays du Dropt	2-0	Fc Des Coteaux Du Libournais
55.	AS Coteaux de Dordogne	8-0	FC Belvèsois
56.	US Virazeil Puymiclan	3-0	FC Lalinde Couze Sauveboeuf
57.	AS Villacoise	3-1	Ent Périgord Noir
58.	FC de Faux	0-4	FC Terrasson
59.	FC Pays Beaumontois	4-2	La Thiberienne
60.	Cazaux Olympique	0-8	US Alliance Talençaise
61.	Bruges ES	4-1	Belin Beliet FC
62.	CA Bèglais	3-1 (a.e.t.)	AGJA Cauderan
63.	SAML Lesparre Médoc	2-3	AS Saint-Aubin-de-Médoc
64.	Landes Girondines FC	6-1	AS Avensan-Moulis-Listrac
65.	SpC La Bastidienne	2-1	Club Municipal Omnisports de Bassens
66.	US JSA-CPA	1-3	CS Lantonnais
67.	FC Andernos Sport	9-0	US Le Temple et Le Porge
68.	Salles CA	0-1	Ambaresienne ES
69.	FC Ambès	0-3 w/o	ES Audenge
70.	FC Medoc Ocean	2-0	RC Chambéry
71.	ASMUR	5-2	FC La Ribère
72.	FC Vallee de L'Ousse	4-1	AS Mourenx-Bourg
73.	Union Saint Maurice Grenade	2-5	FC Espagnol Pau
74.	FC Hagetmau	4-1	ES Bournos Doumy
75.	F.R.E.P. St Vincent de Paul	1-4	FA Morlaàs Est Béarn
76.	FC Gantois	1-0	ES Meillon-Assat-Narcastet
77.	Latrille US	1-6	Pau Portugais US
78.	FC des Enclaves Et du Plateau	1-3	SC Arthez Lacq Audejos
79.	Union Jurançonnaise	0-4	FC Doazit
80.	Sp Portugais Villenave D'Ornon	3-2	FC Le Barp
81.	St J. Macaudaise	0-1	RC Bordeaux
82.	FC Pierroton Cestas Toctoucau	0-2	FC Arsac Lepian Medoc
83.	JS Teichoise	0-5	Union St Bruno FC Sab
84.	Bouliacaise FC	1-3	Bordeaux Etudiants Club
85.	AS Saint Seurinoise	6-3 (a.e.t.)	Ludonaise US
86.	Cocarde De St Laurent Benon	1-4	Stade Pauillacais FC
87.	FC Hourtin-Naujac	2-4	US Pointe du Médoc
88.	AS Le Haillan	5-2	FC Medoc Atlantique
89.	FC Mérignac	4-6 (a.e.t.)	SC Artesien
90.	USC Léognan	1-5	AS Le Taillan
91.	US Fargues	4-2	Parempuyre CA
92.	FC Communes du Creonnais	3-1	Merignac AC
93.	Montferrand AS	3-1	RC De La Laurence
94.	RC D'Hastignan	0-12	SC Cadaujac
95.	A.S. Beautiranaise F	0-0 (4-3 p)	Vaillante Sport Caudrot
96.	Beguey Cadillac FC	1-2 (a.e.t.)	Fraternelle de Landiras
97.	Targon-Soulignac FC	2-2 (3-5 p)	La Joyeuse Saint-Sulpice-et-Cameyra
98.	Entente Sportive Verdelais	1-6	US Illats
99.	Leogeats US	1-3	Bordeaux AC
100.	Pessac Stade UC	2-1	Carbon Blanc CA
101.	Les Bleuets Macariens	3-2	Gradignan US

=== Atlantique ===
These matches were played 29 and 30 August 2015.

First round results: Atlantique

Tie no	Home team (tier)	Score	Away team (tier)
1.	AOS Pontchateau	0-5	AC St Brevin
2.	US Bugalliere Orvault	0-5	Amicale Dolaysienne
3.	SC Appremont	1-3	FC Bouaye
4.	FC Pierretardiere	0-4	Entente Sud Vendee
5.	Doutre SC d'Angers	0-7	ASVR Ambillou Chateau
6.	US Basse Indre	0-2	AS Grandchamps des Fontaines
7.	Beaulieu Sport Football	3-2 (a.e.t.)	Etoile S Belleville sur Vie
8.	L'Ile d'Elle Canton Chaille Pictons	3-1 (a.e.t.)	Foot Espoir 85 Nalliers
9.	Etoile S La Copechagniere	1-0	AS Bruffiere Defontaine
10.	FC Noirmoutier	0-1	US Pont St Martin
11.	St Pierre d'Avessac	2-3 (a.e.t.)	FC Sud Vilaine
12.	Oudon Couffe FC	1-0	FC Laurentais Landemontais
13.	Saint Martin Treize Septiers Football	0-4	St Georges Football Club
14.	AS La Madeleine	2-1	CS Montoirin
15.	Amicale A St Hilaire de Clisson	2-7	ES Vertou Foot
16.	FC Logne et Boulogne	2-3 (a.e.t.)	Fay-Bouvron FC
17.	Entente S Varennes Villebernier	1-4	AS St Hilaire Vihiers St Paul
18.	AS Lac de Maine Angers	1-4	SC Notre Dame des Champs Angers
19.	Pomjeannais Jeanne d'Arc	3-5 (a.e.t.)	US Varadaise
20.	USC Corner	0-2	Entente S l'Aubance Brissac Quince
21.	AS St Mesmin	2-1	SA St Florent des Boise
22.	US Ferrieroise	2-3	Verrie Saint-Aubin VDS
23.	Amicale Laique Couets Bouguenais	3-1	Abbaretz Saffre FC
24.	US Stade Reine Bretagne	1-3	Entente S de Pornichet
25.	FC Ingrandes le Fresne	1-7	Entente S Denee Loire et Louet
26.	US Chauche	0-1	Elan de Gorges
27.	US Combre Bel Air Noyant	2-1	FC Chaudron St Quentin
28.	US Herminoise	5-3	FC Jard Avrille
29.	US Marais Beauvoir Sur Mer	1-0	FC Bourgneuf en Retz
30.	FC Fief Geste	0-2	La Vigilante de St Fulgent
31.	US Le Pellerin	2-3	FC La Montagne
32.	Stade O Cande Freigne F	0-1 (a.e.t.)	Entente S La Poeuze
33.	FC La Garnache	4-5	Etoile S Grosbreuil
34.	Croix Blanche Angers Football	3-2	AS d'Avrille
35.	US Guenrinoise	1-2	Entente S de Blain
36.	FC Belligne St Sauveur	1-0	Les Jeunes d'Erbray
37.	St Sebastien Boussay	0-1	FC Generaudiere Roche Sud
38.	La Fraternelle Mortagne Sur Sevre	2-1	Rocheserviere Bouaine FC
39.	Avenir FC Bouin Bois de Cene	0-1	FC Chabossiere
40.	Fuilet Chaussaire FC	5-4	USJA St Martin Avire Louvaine
41.	Etoile du Bocage Boissiere Montaigu	1-1 (4-3 p)	AF Chapelle Heulin
42.	US Champ St Pere	0-6	Amicale Sportive Landevieille
43.	Tourlandry Vezins Chanteloup ES	1-3	Avenir S de Bouffere
44.	Etoile S Gavraise	3-4 (a.e.t.)	Amicale Laique Chateaubriant
45.	RC Doue La Fontaine	0-5	SC Angevin
46.	AS Dom/Tom Fontenay Le Comte	0-1	Rev St Aubinois
47.	AS St Maixent Sur Vie	0-7	AS de la Maine Aigrefeuille-Remouille
48.	US Vouvant Bourneau Cezais	0-5	Rev S Ardelay
49.	La Membrolle Plessis US	1-3	Entent S du Layon
50.	Nantes Sud 98	9-0	Esp du Marais Sallertaine
51.	US Meilleraie Tillay	2-3 (a.e.t.)	Mormaison US Sulpice Andre Mormaison
52.	US Briolletaine Briollay	3-1 (a.e.t.)	US Cantenay Epinard
53.	Coex Olympique	0-3	FC des Achards
54.	FC de la Cote Sauvage Le Croisic Batz sur Mer	1-2	La St Andre
55.	FC Falleron Froidfond	3-4	Arche FC
56.	US Esp Dompierre Sur Yon	0-3	Etoile de Clisson
57.	Entente S Vallet	0-4	Avenir Regriperois Crepinois Tilliers
58.	SS Antigny St Maurice des Noues	2-2 (5-4 p)	Pays Chantonnay Foot
59.	FC St Julien Vaire	2-4 (a.e.t.)	St Pierre S Nieul le Dolent
60.	Stade Christine Bourgneuf FC	3-3 (p)	Union St Leger des Bois St Germain des Pres Champtoce sur Loire Avenir
61.	Stade Coueron FC	0-3	Geneston AS Sud Loire
62.	CP Asserac Football	0-1	Epse de Crossac
63.	Lege FC	1-2	St Gilles St Hilaire FC
64.	Les Aiglons Durtalois de Durtal	5-1	ES Val Baugeois
65.	AS Valanjou	1-2	AS St Sylvain d'Anjou
66.	St Pierre SF La Guyonniere	1-3	Andreze Jub-Jallais FC
67.	Entente S Chateau d'Olonne	0-1	US Aubigny
68.	St Venante Sp La Meignanne	0-5	Chatelais Football Club
69.	Esp S de Montilliers	3-5 (a.e.t.)	FC des Portugais de Cholet
70.	Remparte S Bouperien	0-4	ASPTT - CAEB Cholet
71.	Etoile de Vie du Fenouiller	2-3 (a.e.t.)	St Olonne Sur Mer
72.	FC La Genetouze	0-3	US Bournezeau St Hilaire
73.	St Medard St Mars de Coutais	0-5	FC de l'Immaculee St Nazaire
74.	Trignac OM	0-4	St Cyr Herbignac
75.	US Bazoges Paillers Beaurepaire	0-3 (a.e.t.)	Cheffois-St Maurice le Girard Etoile Fraternelle
76.	US Getinge	3-1 (a.e.t.)	Vieillevigne la Planche ASF
77.	Les Farfadets St Paul en Pareds	0-8	FC Castel Fiacrais
78.	Landreau Loroux Bottereau SC	0-3	En Avant La Tessoualle
79.	St Joachim Briere Sports	0-2	St Marc Foot
80.	Football Club Sevre et Maine	1-2	JSC Bellevue Nantes

Tie no	Home team (tier)	Score	Away team (tier)
81.	Etoile Mouzillonnaise	3-4	L'Hirondelle St Julien Concelles
82.	Jeune France St Prouant Monsireigne	1-3	Amicale S Landaise
83.	L'Eclair de Chauve	1-2	FC Estuaire Paimboeuf
84.	Les Touches FC	0-1	La Saint Pierre de Nantes
85.	AS de Mesanger	6-1	AS des Genets d'Or Chappelle Genet
86.	Esp St Yves de Nantes	2-1	St Michel de Jans
87.	Loups S Ste Flaive des Loups	0-6	Loups S Grasla Les Brouzils
88.	La Salle Coron AS	3-5	FC Ste Cecile St Martin Des Noyers
89.	Bauge En Avante Baugeois	3-1	CAS Possosavennieres
90.	St Laurent Malvent FC	0-1	St Pierre de Maziere En Mauges
91.	Entente S St Lambert Des Levees	0-2 (a.e.t.)	Entente S Gennes Les Rosiers Sur Loire
92.	FC Chavagnes-La Rabateliere	1-3	AS Longeron Torfou
93.	Jeanne d'Arc Besne	1-2 (a.e.t.)	Etoile du Don Moisdon Meilleraye
94.	AC Angers HSA	1-7	FC Becon St Augustin
95.	USC Frossetaine de Frossay	1-3	Commequiers Sp
96.	St Laurent du Mottay FC Mesnilaurentais	3-1	FC Villedieu-La Renaudiere
97.	Entente S La Romagne Roussay	2-2 (4-3 p)	FC Mouchamps Rochetrejoux
98.	FC Des Trois Rivieres	4-2	Entente S Dresny Plesse
99.	Herblanetz FC	0-2	US de Marans
100.	Hermitage de Venansault	2-1	AS Givrand
101.	FC Loulaysien	2-2 (4-2 p)	Energie Le May Sur Evre
102.	US St Georges Sur Loire	2-6	Jeanne-Arc St Mars Du Dessert
103.	Quilly-Ste Anne Sur Brivet AS du Brivet	2-5	Donges FC
104.	Cercle A Vouvantais-US Glainoise	1-2 (a.e.t.)	US Soudan
105.	St Herblain OC	3-1	FC Mouzeil Teille Ligne
106.	AS de Prinquiau	1-5	Amicale Ecoles Pont Rousseau Reze
107.	AS Reveil Vernantes	2-0	Somloireyzernay CP Foot
108.	AS du Vignoble Monnieres le Pallet	0-3	Christophese Guiniere
109.	Heric FC	1-2	Sympho Foot Treillieres
110.	AS Ponts de Ce	3-2	Eglantine S Trelaze
111.	US St Aubin des Chateaux	1-0	St Vincent des Landes Lustvi
112.	Jeanne d'Arc de Villemaison	3-2	Entente S St Georges des Gardes
113.	St Sebastien Profondine	1-3	ASR Machecoul
114.	Etoile S Haute Goulaine	0-2	FC Brannois Boisseen
115.	AS Chaze Vern	0-4	AS Tierce Cheffes
116.	Entente S des Marais	2-3	Pornic Foot
117.	Anjou Baconne FC	0-3	FC Pellouailles Corze
118.	US St Etienne Palluau La Chappelle Palluau	1-3	FC Talmondais
119.	Nieul Maillezais les Autises FC	0-2	L'Hermenault FC Plaine et Bocage
120.	Avenir S Marsacais	0-4	Entente S Maritime Piriac Turballe
121.	St Michel S L'Herbergement	0-3	ASC St Medard de Doulon Nantes
122.	FC Nyoiseau Bouille Menard Gruge L'Hopital	1-2	Jeune Garde de l'Erdre Suce
123.	St Melaine Olympique Sport	2-4	AS Seiches Sur le Loir Marce
124.	Avenir S Le Puy St Bonnet	5-2	US Les Epesses Saint Mars
125.	St Philbert du Pont Charrault Reorthe Jaudonniere FC	3-2 (a.e.t.)	Jeune France de Cholet
126.	La Fraternelle St Macaire en Mauges	1-2	ES St Denis La Chavesse
127.	Etoile S du Lac St Lumeine de Coutais	3-0	Gaubretiere St Martin FC
128.	AS du Noyantais	1-2 (a.e.t.)	C Om St Mars La Jaille S
129.	Reveil St Gereon	5-1	AS du Louroux Beconnais
130.	UMP Football St Nazaire	1-4	La Malouine St Malo de Guersac
131.	L'Herbadilla La Chevrolliere	2-4 (a.e.t.)	US Bernardiere Cugand
132.	Don Bosco Football Nantes	0-5	Nantes Saint Joseph Porterie
133.	Jeune France Boissiere des Landes	1-3	Entente S Les Pineaux
134.	AC Longue	1-4	AS Bayard Saumur St Hilaire St Florent
135.	Club du Haut Layon	6-0	St Leger Begrolles Be Leger FC
136.	Etoile S Longevillaise	1-5	US Michelais Triolaise
137.	Entente S Puy Vaudelnay	2-3	US Maze
138.	La Panafricaine	0-1	Amicale Beignon Basset Poire sur Vie
139.	St Florent Boutouchere FC Ble	0-2	AS Sion Lusanger
140.	FC Stephanois	1-0	Nozay Olympique Sport
141.	AS Salle Aubry Poiteviniere	3-4	FC du Layon
142.	AS St Gervais	5-1	Etoile du Cens Nantes
143.	Avenir F Trementines	0-2	ASPTT Nantes
144.	Goelands Sammaritains	1-3	Les Ecureuils des Pays de Monts
145.	Nort AC	1-0	Olympique Lire Drain
146.	Saint Aignan FC	1-1 (3-4 p)	FC Salignais de Saligny
147.	Amis S Guillaumoise Pontchateau	3-2	Savenay Malville FC
148.	Espe S de Rouge	2-2 (5-6 p)	FC Le Pin Vritz
149.	US Landeronde St Georges	1-1 (4-3 p)	Elan Sorinieres Football
150.	USDR Thousarsais La Caillere	0-2	US Autize Vendee
151.	Oceane FC	1-0	US St Viaud
152.	Ste Foy FC	0-2	Reveil S des Clouzeaux
153.	Petit Mars FC	3-2	SC St Gemmes d'Andigne
154.	FC de Toutes Aides Nantes	2-0	FC de Retz
155.	Orvault RC	2-1	Etoile des Mauges St Andrew de la Marche
156.	Avenir S des Mauges	0-3	Entente S d'Andard Brain
157.	FC du Val de Moine St German Sur Moine	1-0	Metallo S Chantenay Nantes
158.	FC Villeveque Soucelles	2-6 (a.e.t.)	Montreuil Juigne Bene F
159.	SC Nord Atlantique Derval	2-3 (a.e.t.)	Espe de Campbon
160,	Chalonnes Chaudefonds Football	0-5	AS Independante de Murs-Erigne
161.	Montournais Menomblet FC	1-2	Toutelemonde Maulevrier US
162.	Entente S Vigneux de Bretagne	0-1	AS Sautronnaise

=== Auvergne ===
These matches were played 22, 23 and 30 August 2015.

First round results: Auvergne

Tie no	Home team (tier)	Score	Away team (tier)
1.	Saignes FC	2-2 (2-5 p)	Sud Cantal Foot
2.	US Vals Le Puy	0-9	AS Chadrac
3.	CS Chantellois	0-3 w/o	FC La Chappelle Molles
4.	US de Doyet	4-1	AS de Premilhat
5.	AS Chaudes Aigues	1-2	AS Espinat F
6.	AS Villettoise	0-1	US Brioude
7.	AS St Ours	0-4	AS Enval-Marsat
8.	ES St Germinoise	0-5	US Issoire A du Mas (Note: Team subsequently penalised and removed from competition. Opposition awarded victory)
9.	US Maringuoise	5-0	AS La Haute Dordogne
10.	US de Messeix Bourg Lastic	2-4	Cébazat Sports
11.	FC Issoire 2	1-5	Dômes Sancy Foot
12.	AS Romagnat	5-2	AS Saint Genès Champanelle
13.	Etoile Moulins Yzeure	2-2 (3-1 p)	Amicale C Creuzier le Vieux
14.	CS Thielois	0-6	A Amicale Lapalissoise
15.	US Lusignoise	1-15	FC Souvignyssois
16.	AS Neuillyssoise	3-1	AS de Le Breuil
17.	Amicale S St Angel	3-2	US de Bien-Assis Montlucon
18.	Vigilante Garnat St Martin	2-0	US Vallonnaise
19.	CO Art de la Cote Commentary	0-2	AS de Billezois
20.	AS Toulonnaise	1-3	AS Mercy-Chapeau
21.	AS Nerisienne	0-3 w/o	US Vendatoise
22.	AS Gennetinoise	0-3	Stade St Yorrais
23.	AS St Prix	4-3	US Biachette
24.	US Saulzet-Escurolles	0-3 w/o	SC Amicale Cussetois
25.	AS Montmaraultoise F	4-2	AS Ferrières Sur Sichon
26.	AS Villebretoise	1-5	US Lignerolles Lavault St Anne
27.	Bourbon Sports	3-1	Bellerive Brugheas Football
28.	SC Ygrandais	1-5	AS Dompierroise
29.	Amicale S Villeneuvoise	1-3	Ballon Beaulonnais
30.	US Abrestoise	3-4	Montagne Bourbonnaise FC
31.	AS Cerilly	2-4	US Trezelloise
32.	JS Neuvy	2-5	FC Billy-Crechy
33.	CS Villefranchois	6-2 (a.e.t.)	Amicale S Treveloise
34.	AS Chatel De Neuvre	1-2	AS Chassenard Luneau
35.	AS de Tronget	4-2	Amicale Laique de Quinssaines
36.	AS Varennoise	2-2 (2-3 p)	SC St Pourcinois
37.	AS de St Loup	0-1	FC de Bezenet
38.	CS de Vaux Estivareilles	4-2	AS Rongeres
39.	SC Gannatois	3-2	CS Cosnois
40.	US Seuillet St Gerandaise	1-2	US Pop Commentary
41.	US Chevagnoise	0-5	US St Victor
42.	AS Montvicquoise	0-2	ASPTT Moulins
43.	US Meaulnoise Urcay	0-2	AS Des Cheminots St Germanois
44.	OC de Monetay Sur Allier	0-8	AS Nord Vignoble
45.	Etoile S Vernetoise	0-1	SC Avermoise
46.	US Malicorne	1-4	Esp. Molinetois
47.	AS Louchyssoise	3-5	CS de Bessay
48.	US Voussacoise	1-3	ES de Diou
49.	AS Talizatoise	0-3	FC Moussageois
50.	AS Cézens	0-3 w/o	US Siranaise
51.	Et Valagnone	0-2	US Cère et Landes
52.	US Aspre Maronne	0-7	Cere FC Vic-Polminhac
53.	FC Albepierre Bredons	1-6	Cercle S Arpajonnais
54.	FC Junhac-Montsalvy	3-4	US Crandelloise
55.	FC Coltines	2-3	Amicale S Sansacoise
56.	US Chaussenacoise	1-3 (a.e.t.)	AS Naucelles
57.	AS St Just	0-3	FC Ally Mauriac
58.	US du Haut Célé	3-0	Entente S Vebret-Ydes
59.	US de Carbonat	1-6	Carladez Goul Sportif
60.	Entente S Vitrac-Marcoles	1-4	US La Garde - Loubaresse
61.	FC Cezallier Alagnon	1-4	FC Massiac-Molompize-Blesle
62.	US La Chapelle Laurent	2-4	US Vallée de l'Authre
63.	FC Minier	2-5	ES Pierrefortaise
64.	Cercle S Vezacois	2-1	Jordanne FC
65.	AS Aurillacoise	0-3	Sp Chataigneraie Cantal
66.	Amicale S Yolet	0-1	AS Doire-Bertrande

Tie no	Home team (tier)	Score	Away team (tier)
67.	AS de St Poncy	0-10	Entente Stade Riomois-Condat
68.	AS Ayrens St Illide	0-1	FC de l'Artense
69.	AS Laussonne	1-3	US Bassoise
70.	C Om Coubon	1-5	US Arsac En Velay
71.	FC Vezezoux	0-11	FC Espaly
72.	Montregard Jeunes et Loisirs Raucoles	3-1	AS Loudoise
73.	St Paulien Blanzac FC	2-0	Sauveteurs Brivois
74.	US Fontannoise	0-1	SC Langoge
75.	CO Crapponais	0-4	AS Cheminots Langeac
76.	AS St Christophe Sur Dolaizon	1-5	FC Aurec
77.	Seauve Sp	3-2	AS Beaulieu
78.	FC de Tence	1-0	FC St Germain Laprade
79.	Amicale S Montfaucon	0-2	FC Dunieres
80.	FC Lamothe	1-8	AS Emblavez - Vorey
81.	Retournac Sp	4-2	US Sucs et Lignon
82.	AS Grazac Lapte	2-4	US Monistrol Sur Loire
83.	US Lantriac	0-0 (4-2 p)	AS St Didier - St Just
84.	Olympique St Julien Chapteuil	1-3	US Blazovy
85.	FC Plauzat Champeix	3-2	AS Chateaugay Football
86.	US Menetrol	2-4	FC Chatel Guyon
87.	FC Nord Limagne	4-2	AS Cellule
88.	Etoile S St Remy Sur Durolle	1-2	Amicale Laique S de Besse Egliseneuve
89.	AS Livradois Sud	2-3	FC Lezoux
90.	FC Blanzat	0-0 (4-2 p)	SC Billomois
91.	RC Charbonnieres les Varennes	2-4	Aulnat Sp
92.	Entente S Couze Pavin	3-5 (a.e.t.)	AS de Malintrat
93.	US Val de Couze Chambon	0-8	Ambert FCUS Ambertoise
94.	CS St Bonnet Pres Riom	5-1	AS Orcines
95.	AS de Joze	0-15	FC Riomois
96.	JS St Priest des Champs	2-2 (4-3 p)	CSA Brassacois Florinois
97.	AS Cunlhatoise	2-0	Clermont Fontaine de Bac FC
98.	US Les Martres d'Artieres	2-3 (a.e.t.)	US Beaumontoise
99.	Entente S Champeyroux Surat Les Martre	0-4	Perignat FC
100.	US Chapdes Beaufort	1-1 (5-4 p)	US Orcetoise
101.	US Lapeyrouse	1-3	La Combelle Charbonnier A Breui
102.	Durolle Foot	3-2	CO Veyre Monton
103.	CS St Anthemois	4-4 (4-1 p)	FC Mezelois
104.	US Gerzatoise	2-1	US Ennezat
105.	US Limonoise	0-1	US Vic Le Comte
106.	FC Nord Combraillo	7-0	AS Royat AC
107.	AS de Charensat	2-3	FC Olby-Ceyssat-Mazayes
108.	Amicale Laique Glaine Montaigut	2-8	Entente FC St Amant et Tallende
109.	FC de Sayat D'Argnat	1-2	US St Beauzire
110.	Ecureils Franc Rosier	2-4	Esp Ceyratoise
111.	FC Mirefleurs	0-4	US St Gervaisienne
112.	Fraternelle Amicale le Cendre	1-3	US Les Martres de Veyre
113.	CS Pont de Dore	2-7	Clermont Outre Mer
114.	Entente CAS Durollien Grpe Portugais	0-6	US Courpieroise
115.	Entente S St Sauves Tauves	0-8	CS Pont du Chateau
116.	FC Vertaizon	1-3	US Mozac
117.	A des Guineens de la Region Auvergne FC	1-1 (5-4 p)	A Ouvoimoja
118.	FC Hauts de Cere Thiezac St Jacques des Blats	1-2	Etoile S St Mamet

=== Lower Normandy ===
These matches were played on 21, 22 and 23 August 2015.

First round results: Lower Normandy

Tie no	Home team (tier)	Score	Away team (tier)
1.	AS St Cyr Fervaques	0-6	CA Lisieux F Pays d'Auge
2.	AS Passais St Fraimbault	2-2 (2-4 p)	A Les Leopards de St Georges
3.	Amicale S Cahagnaise	3-2	US Aunay Sur Odon
4.	AS Sacey Tanis	0-2	AS Jullouville Sartilly
5.	Entente S Hebecrevon	2-1	Esp S Pirou
6.	A Soligny Aspres Moulins F	0-2	FC du Pays Aiglon
7.	Inter Odon F Communuatire	0-1	LC Bretteville Sur Odon
8.	FC Val de Saire	2-2 (1-3 p)	AC Sideville - Virandeville - Teurtheville-Hague
9.	AS Valognes F	1-3	UC Bricquebetaise F
10.	Avenire S Ste Marie Du Mont	2-2 (3-4 p)	US La Glacerie
11.	AS Greville Hague	0-5	US Cote des Iles
12.	ES Plain	3-2	A St Martin Hardinvast-Tollevast-Couville
13.	AS Pointe Cotentin	3-1	St Urville Nacqueville
14.	Patronage Laique Octeville	0-1	AS Brix
15.	CS de Barfleur	1-4	ES Quettetot Rauville
16.	AS Querquevillaise F	2-1	Stade Municipal Haytillon
17.	Elan de Tocqueville	0-5	US Ouest Cotentin
18.	FC 3 Rivieres	4-2	Periers S
19.	US Lessay	3-3 (3-4 p)	Etoile S Gouville Sur Mer
20.	Etoile S Munevillaise	0-3	Creances S
21.	US Roncey Cerisy	5-0	US Vesly Laulne
22.	Entente le Lorey-Hauteville-Feugeres	1-2	FC Sienne
23.	Entente S Trelly Quettreville Contrieres	2-4	Etoile S Marigny Lozon Mesnil Vigot
24.	US Pontorson	1-3 (a.e.t.)	Etoile S Isigny Le Buat
25.	AS Cerencaise	0-3 w/o	Etoille S du Terregate et du Beuvron
26.	Entente S Haylande	0-8	AS Brecey
27.	US Percy	1-2	CS Villedieu
28.	La Brehalaise	0-7	Esp St Jean Champs
29.	Etoille S Tirepied	0-3	St Hilaire Virey Landelles
30.	US St Quentin le Homme	0-1 (a.e.t.)	US St Pairaise
31.	Entente S Marcilly St Ovin	0-11	US des Mouettes Donville
32.	Esp St Jean de la Haize	7-3	US Gavrayenne
33.	US St Martindes Champs	0-0 (4-2 p)	La Patroite St Jamaise
34.	Nouveau Groupe S de Ver Sur Mer	0-6	US Semilly St Andre
35.	FC de L'Elle	0-5	CA Pontois
36.	Avenir Joyeux St Hilaire Petitville	0-8	AS St Vigor Le Grand
37.	Entente Cantonale Tessy Moyon Sports	8-0	Entente S Intercommunale May Sur Orne
38.	US Athisienne	1-2	US d'Andaine
39.	JS de Tinchebray	5-0	Foyer Laique de Segrie Fontaine
40.	Sp Laique Petruvien	0-3 w/o	USC Omnisports de Sourdeval
41.	Amicale Mines La Ferriere Aux Etangs	1-0	Avenir de Messei
42.	US Frenes Montsecret	1-3	US Int La Graverie
43.	AS La Salle La Forge	2-1	FC Landais
44.	CO Ceauce	1-0	Jeunesse Fertoise Bagnoles
45.	AS Couteille Alençon	1-3	AS Sarceaux Espoir

Tie no	Home team (tier)	Score	Away team (tier)
46.	AS Bouce	2-2 (3-1 p)	Sees FC
47.	Stade Alençon	1-4	Amicale S Gaceenne
48.	A Chailloue	1-0	Entente S Forges Radon Vingt Hanaps
49.	AS Villeneuve Alençon	9-1	FC Ecouche
50.	US Putanges	0-2	Esp Conde Sur Sarthe
51.	AS Le Merlerault - Nonent-Le-Pin	1-5	AS Avenir St Germain Du Corbeis
52.	FC Remelard Moutiers	0-7	Entente S Pays Ouche
53.	E St Symphorien Des Bruyeres	1-4	FC St Germain De La Coudre
54.	A L'Etoile du Perche	2-3	Vimoutiers FC
55.	Iton FC	0-5	US Mortagnaise
56.	AS Berd Huis Football	10-0	Vedette de Boisthorel
57.	AS Vaudry Truttemer	0-2	Societe S St Georges - Domfront
58.	ES Portais	8-1	FC Commes
59.	La Cambe FC	3-4	Ev S du Tronquay
60.	US Tilly Sur Seulles	0-2	FC Des Etangs
61.	ES Isigny Sur Mer	2-11	US Ste Croix de St Lo
62.	US Maisons	2-1	Lystrienne S
63.	JS D'Audrieu	1-13	US Intercommunale Bessin Nord
64.	Amicale S Verson	3-0	Conde S
65.	FC Laize Clinchamp	0-11	US Villers Bocage
66.	ASL L'Ajon	1-8	Etoile S Thury Harcourt
67.	Amicale FC St Denis De Mere	5-4	Hastings FC de Rots
68.	Entente s Val de l'Orne	2-0	US Cheux St Manvieu Norrey
69.	Etoile S Bonnebosq	2-3	Entente S FC Falaise
70.	CS Beuvillers	2-1	US Petruvienne
71.	Etoile S Courtonnaise	0-2	AS Potigny-Villers Canivet-Ussy
72.	SC St Julien Le Falcon	1-9	FC Lisieux Pays d'Auge
73.	AS La Hoguette	1-3 (a.e.t.)	FC Louvigny
74.	Etoile S Livartaise	3-1	Cingal FC
75.	US des Cheminots Mezidon Football	1-1 (4-2 p)	CS Orbecquois Vesperois
76.	Etoile S Amfrevillaise	1-2	FC Argences
77.	Maison S L Garcelles Secqueville	0-1	Hermanville Lion Sur Mer FC
78.	Stade St Sauveurais	2-4	US Gueriniere
79.	Entente S Cormelles Football	3-0 w/o	AS Ouilly Le Vicomte
80.	JS Fleury Sur Orne	0-2	US Houlgate
81.	Amicale S Bieville Beuville	0-2	US Municipale Blainvillaise
82.	AS Moult Bellengreville	3-1	US Pont L'Eveque
83.	US Bretteville L'Orgueilleuse	3-3 (3-4 p)	Cambes En Plaine Sp
84.	US Authie	0-7	Bourguebus Soliers FC
85.	Entente S Grenthevillaise	0-4	JS Collevillaise
86.	US Cresserons Plumetot	0-4	US Thaon - Le Fresne - Vallee de la Mue
87.	ES de Troarn Section F	1-2	CS Honfleur
88.	FC Langrune Luc	2-0	AS Demouville Foot
89.	Entente F Touques St Gatien	1-4	Dozule FC

=== Bourgogne ===
These matches were played on 23 and 30 August 2015.

First round results: Bourgogne

Tie no	Home team (tier)	Score	Away team (tier)
1.	RC Entrains Sur Nohain	0-6	U Cosnoise S
2.	Racing Club de Sens	1-2	US Joigny
3.	FC Chamesson	1-8	AS Magny
4.	Entente Chatel Gerard et du Nucerien	2-4	FC de Moneteau
5.	US Cercycoise	2-3	ASC Pougues
6.	RC Nevers-Challuy Sermoise	3-2	Avenir S Fourchambault
7.	St Forgeot Dracy S	1-3	Digoin FCA
8.	Les Gacheres FC Gueugnon	0-5	US Bourbon Lancy FPT F
9.	FC Joncyois	2-3	Dun Sornin Foot
10.	US Cluny F	1-1 (6-5 p)	CO Chauffailles
11.	Entente S St Germain Du Plain Baudrie	1-0 (a.e.t.)	JS Crechoise
12.	US Givry St Desert	1-10	US de Meursault
13.	Jeunesse Ouvriere du Creusot	5-0	Foyer Leo Lagrande Gergy Verjux
14.	US Crissotine	1-3	AS Chatenoy Le Royal
15.	ASUJL St Jean De Losne	1-6	CS Auxonnais
16.	Dijon U Luso Francaise Europeen	0-1	US Cheminots Dijonnais
17.	Cercle Laique Marsannay	3-3 (7-8 p)	Cercle S Laique Chenove
18.	FC Neuilly	0-5	Chevigny St Sauveur F
19.	AS Perrigny Les Dijon	2-10	ASPTT Dijon
20.	AS Tournusienne	4-1	RC Flace Macon

=== Brittany ===
These matches were played on 22 and 23 August 2015.

First round results: Brittany

Tie no	Home team (tier)	Score	Away team (tier)
1.	Loctudy AS	0-3 w/o	FC Treffiagat Guilvinec
2.	Meslan FC	0-2	Cleguer Kerchopine
3.	Morlaix US	0-2	Cleder US
4.	Roscoff Paot Rosk	2-5 (a.e.t.)	Bodilis/plougar FC
5.	Treglonou US Aber	2-4	Brest St Laur
6.	Guerlesquinaise	0-3	Plouegat Lanmeur US
7.	Guimiliau USS	1-2	Guiclan FC
8.	Plourin Les Morl AV	3-1	St Pol Leon Slk
9.	St Vougay AS	0-3	Santec AS
10.	Plougourvest Ef	0-0 (4-2 p)	Lanhouarneau Plou
11.	Kerlouan FC Cot Leg	0-4	Le Folgoet Cnd
12.	Plouguin Gars St Maj	0-8	Plouvien AS
13.	St Pabu Avel Vor	1-3	Lannilis SC
14.	Kernilis H.	1-3 (a.e.t.)	Portsall Kersaint ES
15.	Breles/lan Ja	0-1	Guilers AS
16.	La Forest Jgf	2-4	Bourg Blanc Gsy
17.	Loperhet RC	1-2	Brest Ascaval
18.	Pencran US	0-3	Brest Legion Sp
19.	Roche Maurice US	0-4	Le Relecq Kerhuon FC
20.	Plouider Gas	0-4	Berven Plouzevede
21.	Plougoulm Cad	0-4	Taule US
22.	Coat Meal AS	0-2	Brest Pl Berg
23.	St Fregant Vaillante	0-5	Plouescat St Pierre
24.	Ploumoguer As	2-6	Lanrivoare SC
25.	Lampaul Plouarzel FC	1-2	Ploudalmezeau Arz
26.	Plouezoch FC	0-5	Scrignac AS
27.	Plouigneau US	0-1	Carantec Etoile
28.	Ste Seve FC	1-3	Locquirec Gars Rive
29.	Lampaulaise ES	2-1	Plougasnou Et
30.	Berrien Huelgoat ES	2-0	Le Faou Cranou ES
31.	Irvillac Mignonne ES	1-1 (3-4 p)	Pleyber Christ ES
32.	St Servais St D US	1-4	Gars De Plouenan
33.	Sizun Le Trehou AS	3-0	Dirinon AS
34.	Plouneventer ES	1-2	St Divy Sport
35.	Locmaria ES	1-2	Brest Beneton
36.	Plouarzel Esa	5-0	Kersaint AS
37.	Landeda AS	7-0	Brest Bergot FC
38.	Coataudon Al	1-0	Plougonvelin US
39.	Landerneau Stade	0-6	Plouedern Ese
40.	St Thonan JS	3-0	Logonna Far
41.	Brest Asptt	3-1	Guisseny ES
42.	Camaret AS	0-1	Telgruc S/mer AS
43.	Plomodiern Gmh	0-4	Crozon Morgat US
44.	Loperec Sp.	0-0 (1-3 p)	St. Pleybennois
45.	Brasparts Loque. US	0-8	Chateauneuf US
46.	Lennon US	0-9	Landeleau US
47.	St Thois Sp	4-1	St Goazec
48.	St Hernin US	0-4	Cleden Poher US
49.	Carhaix AC	2-1 (a.e.t.)	Plounevezel Toros
50.	Poullaouen US	4-1	Kergloff US
51.	Motreff AS	0-6	Spezet Pb
52.	Leuhan AS	0-2	Plonevez Gas
53.	Dineault AS	2-0	St Nic Sp.
54.	Lanveoc Sp.	3-1	Pont De Buis AS
55.	Tregourez Zebres	0-1	Coray Glazick
56.	Douarnenez FC	6-0	Porzay RC
57.	Plogonnec ES	1-1 (2-4 p)	Quemeneven US
58.	Langolen ES	0-4	Edern Sp.
59.	Briec Paotred	3-0	Landrevarzec Tricol
60.	Le Juch Diables AS	1-3	Kerlaz Sport
61.	Pouldergat Sp.	0-3	Douarnenez Treboul
62.	Goulien Sp.	1-5	Penn Ar Bed FC
63.	Goyen FC	1-2	Mahalon Confort ES
64.	Beuzec ES	1-2	Gourlizon Sp.
65.	Poullan AS	5-4 (a.e.t.)	Plogastel JS
66.	Peumerit JS	1-1 (1-2 p)	Bigouden FC
67.	Landudec Guil ES	1-6	Pluguffan US
68.	Ploneis ES	0-5	Treogat Marcassins
69.	St Jean Trolimon ES	0-4	Plomeur Gars
70.	Guengat Lapins	2-0	Tremeoc Raquette
71.	Combrit St Marine FC	0-4	Clohars Fouesnant
72.	La Foret Fouesnant	0-2	Quimper Kermoysan
73.	Redene ES	0-3	Mellacois St.
74.	Baye AS	3-2	Tremeven AS
75.	Nevez ES	1-0	Riec S/ Bellon ES
76.	Locunole Sp.	0-3	Concarneau Hermine
77.	Querrien US	0-3	Scaer En Avant
78.	Le Trevoux Coqs	2-1	Elliant Melenicks
79.	Quimper Portugais	2-3	Quimper Ergue Arm
80.	Kernevel AS	1-1 (2-4 p)	St Thurien US
81.	Bannalec Fg	1-2 (a.e.t.)	Rosporden FC
82.	St Yvi AS	2-3	St Evarzec US
83.	Ergue Gaberic Am.	1-0	Quimper Italia Bgne
84.	Baguer Morvan US	3-0	FC Plerg/roz Land
85.	Baguer Pican	0-4 w/o	La Gouesniere
86.	Bord Rance FC	1-3	La Cancalaise Cancal
87.	Dinge CS	1-2	La Meziere AS
88.	Dol Samsonnaise	8-0	Rennes Cpb Villejean
89.	Pleurtuit C.E.Foot	3-0	Epiniac AS Sp
90.	St Coulomb AS	2-1	Baie Mt St Michel FC
91.	La Richardais	1-3	St Malo Ja St Servan
92.	Miniac Morvan	0-2	St Malo C.J.F
93.	Tinteniac St Dom. US	1-4	St Malo Ent Sp
94.	St Guinoux US	1-3	St Suliac OS
95.	Baie La Fresnais US	1-0	St Malo Chat.Malo
96.	St. Meloir	1-2	Meillac Lanh Bonn
97.	Bille Javene US	2-1	Taillis St Christ ES
98.	Marcille Bazouge	3-4	Chap Jans Fleuri Lai
99.	Chatillon Prince A	3-2	Sens Bgne US
100.	Couesnon Av.C	0-11	Steph Bricois
101.	Haute Vilaine FC	2-1	Gosne US
102.	Erce P/ Liffre	2-1	St Marc St Ouen
103.	La Bouexiere Esp	1-4	St Georges Chesne
104.	Le Ferre US	0-5	Fougerais Sud FC
105.	Louvigne Bazouge	1-1 (1-3 p)	Mont Feins St Med
106.	Parigne Landean	0-4	St Germain Mont
107.	Les Aigles Sougeal	2-4	Trem/chauv AS
108.	Illet Foret US	1-5	St Aubin Cormier St.
109.	Torce Vergeal FC	0-4	Acigne US
110.	Bais US	1-5	Balaze Ja
111.	Broons AS	4-0	Boistrudan Pire ES
112.	Brie ES	1-2	Montreuil /per.Lan
113.	Dourdain US	3-1 (a.e.t.)	Chateaub. St Mel
114.	Erbree Mondevert US	0-5	Chateaugiron US
115.	Domagne/st Di	0-3	Thorigne Fouill ES
116.	Domalain Av	1-4	Domloup Sp.
117.	Etrelles AS	3-1	Ren Cpb Gayeu
118.	Janze US	4-2	Mayotte Ille Et Vil
119.	St Aubin Land	1-9	Bleuets Le Pertre Br
120.	St Aubin Pava	1-2	St Germain Pinel
121.	FC Baulon Lassy	3-3 (3-1 p)	Bain De Bretagne
122.	La Chap Bouex	2-4 (a.e.t.)	Bel Air Bourg Co US
123.	Bourgbarre US	2-6	Noyal Chatillon US
124.	Sp.C. St Senoux	0-3	Bruz FC
125.	Racing Club Rennes	1-2	Goven SC
126.	Guignen US	6-1	Renac Hermine
127.	La Bosse B. US	0-8	Ren Athletic Club
128.	St Seglin R	1-4 (a.e.t.)	Laille US
129.	Sixt S/aff Esp	3-0	Lieuron Av
130.	Nouvoitou JS	2-3	Pont Pean US
131.	Orgeres US	3-0 w/o	Rennes Cpb Blosne
132.	Pipriac JA	0-1	St Erblon AS
133.	Ste Marie La Ch US	0-8	Vern US
134.	Parthenay AS	0-4	Bedee Pleumeleuc
135.	Breal Foot JA	2-2 (4-2 p)	Melesse Ja
136.	Chavagne USC	5-2	St Thurial AS
137.	Monterfil Eskouaden	1-2 (a.e.t.)	St Meen St Onen US
138.	Le Crouais US	1-4	Gaelmuel US
139.	Irodouer Av	2-3 (a.e.t.)	Montr Gast
140.	La Chap/cintr	0-2	St Jacques Foot AS

Tie no	Home team (tier)	Score	Away team (tier)
141.	Plelan Maxent	1-7	Mordelles US
142.	Quedillac Sep	0-1	St Gilles US
143.	Breizh Fob Kl Rennes	2-7	Rennes Cpb Foot
144.	Hermitage AC	2-0	Montfort Iffendic Fo
145.	Romille AS	0-4	Rennes FC Mosaique
146.	Le Faouet US	3-1	Guiscriff Avenir
147.	Berne US	0-1	Arzano Jeanne Arc
148.	Priziac AS	0-2	Plouay FC
149.	Le Croisty ES	1-7	Kernas Lignol
150.	Lanvenegen US	1-2	Gestel AS
151.	St. Guemenois	1-3	St Gerand CS
152.	Bubry AS	1-4	Plumeliau CS
153.	Queven CS	4-0	Lorient Vig. Foyer L
154.	Cleguer Stiren	2-3	Calan AS
155.	Inzinzac FA	2-0	Penquesten As
156.	Hennebont Esg	0-1	Kervignac St Efflam
157.	Branderion Gsa	1-3	Hennebont Gv
158.	Hennebont US	0-1 (a.e.t.)	Guideloise La
159.	Plouhinec FC	2-3	Merlevenez ES
160.	Malguenac AO	2-4	Cleguerec FC
161.	L Hermine Guernatte	2-5	Ent.S. Neulliac
162.	Rohan US	0-5	Kerfourn Gse
163.	Av. Buleon Lantillac	0-3	Pleugriffet St P
164.	Josselin CS	7-3	Ent. Mohon St Malo 3
165.	Credin Bleuets	1-4	Reguiny St Clair
166.	Brehan Esp	4-0	Le Sourn SC
167.	Guillac	0-6	Guegon St Gildas
168.	Croix Hellean	0-6	Mauron Indep.
169.	Taupont	3-2	Beignon
170.	Campeneac	0-0 (3-1 p)	St Jean Villenard
171.	Guehenno Cadets	1-0	Radenac Vigilante
172.	St Allouestre Gsa	2-3	La Locminoise
173.	Caro St Herve	0-1	Guer Enfants
174.	Cournon	1-3	Les Fougerets Eo
175.	Carentoir Fond.	1-1 (5-4 p)	Ruffiac Malestroit F
176.	St Abraham Ussac	2-2 (3-4 p)	Loyat Gy.
177.	Lizio Glaneurs	2-4	Guilliers AS
178.	Pleucadeuc JA	2-3 (a.e.t.)	St Congard
179.	St Guyomard	1-6	Le Cours Usp
180.	St Sebastien Caden	4-1	Peillac Ja.
181.	Malansac Patriote	14-0	La Chap. Gaceline
182.	Av. St Vincent S/ous	0-2	St Jacut Les Pins ES
183.	Allaire St-gaudence	3-0 w/o	Missiriac Ecl
184.	St Perreux FC	4-2 (a.e.t.)	St Martin/ous
185.	Noyal Muzillac J F	1-2 (a.e.t.)	Peaule Armoricaine
186.	La Vraie Croix St El	6-0	La Claie AS
187.	Arzal AG	1-2	Rieux St Melaine
188.	Sarzeau	1-3	Damgan Ambon Sp.
189.	St Armel Le Hezo US	0-6	Berric AS
190.	Surzur ES	1-3 (a.e.t.)	Muzillac Os
191.	Tredion Csm	0-3	St Servant S/oust Av
192.	St Nolff AO	1-4	Larre Molac Ent. S.
193.	St Jean Brev.	1-7	Le Roc St Andre Ecur
194.	Plaudren Rah Koed	1-3 (a.e.t.)	Grandchamp Semeurs
195.	Vannes Prat P.S.	0-3	Sulniac Montagn
196.	Limerzel Sc.	3-0 w/o	Vannes AS To.
197.	Monterblanc AS	3-2	Serentaise La
198.	Belle Ile AS	2-2 (3-5 p)	Riantec OC
199.	Remungol ES	1-11	Bieuzy Les Ea
200.	La Chap. Neuve	2-3	Melrand Sp.
201.	Landaul Sp.	4-0	Locoal Mendon
202.	Pluvigner AS	7-1	St Barthelemy
203.	Pluneret CS	2-1	Brech US
204.	St Philibert ES	0-4	Locmariaquer Agg
205.	Le Bono AS	4-0	Plougoumelen AS
206.	Baden Asc.	0-6	Meriadec ES
207.	Ploeren US	1-1 (4-2 p)	Vannes Acsom
208.	Trin. Surzur	2-0	Pluherlin Gentienne
209.	Foy. Laiq. Inguiniel	2-0	Queven Kerzec FC
210.	Ste Helene Av.	1-2	Gavres St
211.	Guermeur Lomener AS	0-1	Languidic FC
212.	Crach ES	0-6	Ploemel ES
213.	Erdeven Etel Foot	3-2	Nostang US
214.	Am.S. Kergonan	0-3	St Thuriau Ggs
215.	Camors Al	0-8	Naizin FC
216.	Landevant Stade	1-0 (a.e.t.)	Guenin Sp.
217.	Colpo ES	1-2	Moustoir Ac AS
218.	Plumelec Meli	1-5	St Jean Brevelay EFC
219.	Meucon AS	2-1	Locqueltas Gl
220.	Arradon US	5-2	Ste Anne D Auray ASC
221.	Trevron FC	2-4	Lanvallay F. US
222.	Bobital AS	0-4	Plelan Vilde FC
223.	Plumaudan AS	3-3 (2-4 p)	Rance Foot Cl
224.	Jugon Dolo Elfc	2-1	Plouasne Saint J
225.	Brusvily US	1-3	Tremorel US
226.	Le Loscoue Meu ES	1-4	Broons Tremeur AS
227.	Et.S. St Cast Le Gui	3-1	Andel JS
228.	Vaf Crehen Pluduno	1-3	Erquy US
229.	Pledeliac AS	3-1	Henansal Hdb
230.	Flora Fc St Alban Pl	3-0	UF Yffiniac
231.	Evron FC	1-2	Coetmieux Pommeret F
232.	Plenee Jugon EA	0-6	Landehen JS
233.	SC St Samson	2-6	Pleslin Trigavou Ef
234.	Vigilante Plemetaise	1-3 (a.e.t.)	Lanrelas CS
235.	Merdrignac CS	2-1	La Prenessaye AS
236.	Langast AS	0-7	Gomene AS
237.	Penguilly ES	0-4	Trebry AS
238.	St Guen E.S.M.	3-2	Loudeac St Bugan FC
239.	Henon US	0-7	Plessala US
240.	Hermitage L FC	1-3	FC Lie Gausson
241.	La Harmoye	0-3 w/o	La Motte As
242.	St Caradec US	2-1	Treve Sp
243.	Poulancre Mur FC	0-1	St Nicolas Pelem US
244.	Glomel US	4-5	Callac US
245.	Mael Carhaix US	0-1	La Croix Corlay FC
246.	Plouguernevel US	7-0	Plounevez Lanrivain
247.	Pestivien ES	0-3	Bourbriac US
248.	FC Du Vieux Bourg	1-3	Kerien Magoar AS
249.	St Carreuc Al	0-3 w/o	La Ploeucoise
250.	Le Foeil ES	2-1	St. Quintinais
251.	Ploufragan St Herve	5-2	Tregueux AFC
252.	Tregueux AS	0-2	Hillion St Rene AS
253.	St Brieuc Cscl	0-5	St Julien Asl
254.	Boqueho EL	1-0	Tremeloir FC
255.	Tregomeur ES	1-3	Plouagat Chatel. FC
256.	Pabu AS	1-2	Ploumagoar RC
257.	FC Lanticais	0-3 w/o	St Quay Goelo FC
258.	Plelo AS	0-5	Lanvollon JS
259.	Plounerin Uo Tregor	2-1	Plestin AS
260.	Pedernec Mbs	2-3	Guingamp Mayotte AS
261.	Louargat US	4-2	Tremel US
262.	Pommerit Le Merzer	1-3	Plouisy US
263.	Plehedel S.	2-0	Squiff-tregon
264.	US Du Pays Rochois	4-4 (0-3 p)	Pontrieux Ent Trieux
265.	Ploumiliau AS	0-4	Servel Lannion AS
266.	Prat US	2-1	Trebeurden Pleum.
267.	Tredrez AS	3-0	Langoat JS
268.	Rospez CS	7-1	Tonquedec KC
269.	Plouezec Goelands	3-5	Pleubian Pleu
270.	St Quay Perro	0-5	Ploubezre US
271.	Lezardrieux Ust	3-2	Penvenan JA
272.	Plourivo Ec.	5-0	Coatreven Rudon ES
273.	Kerity Paimpol US	3-0 w/o	Ploubazlanec ES
274.	Plougrescant Lizildr	1-0	Trelevern Trevou FC
275.	Tredaniel Moncontour	2-4	St Brandan JS
276.	St Barnabe AS	2-1	Plumieux Porh Esa FC
277.	Goudelin US	7-0	St Jacut Sp.

=== Centre-Val de Loire ===
These matches were played on 22, 23 and 30 August 2015.

First round results: Centre-Val de Loire

Tie no	Home team (tier)	Score	Away team (tier)
1.	FC Fussy St Martin Vignoux	0-5	FC Vierzon
2.	USC Chatres Sur Cher Langon Mennetou	0-10	Blois F 41
3.	AS Suevres	0-4	US Balgentienne Val de Loire Beaugency
4.	St Roch City Romorantin	0-5	FC de l'Ouest Tourangeau 37
5.	FC Remois St Remy Sur Avre	1-4	US Vendome
6.	US Cloyes Droue	2-4 (a.e.t.)	FC de Boigny Sur Bionne
7.	A Amicale Ecoles Publiques Laique Thore	1-3	FC St Georges Sur Eure
8.	US Muides - St Dye	0-5	OC Chateaudun
9.	St Loupeen La Loupe	0-1	FC St Peravy Ormes
10.	AS Janvilloise Janville	0-13	Society Municipale OC St Jean De Braye
11.	Amicale Laique EP St Ouen	0-9	US Municipale Saran
12.	Entente Marcehnoir St Leonard	2-7	CA St Laurent Nouan F
13.	US Chateauneuf Sur Loire	1-1 (5-4 p)	US Mer
14.	Cercle Jules Ferry Fleury Les Aubrais	5-0	FC Vendome
15.	Dammarie Foot Bois Gueslin	2-1	FC Magdunois Meung Sur Loire
16.	CS Lusitanos Beaugency	3-0 w/o	Etoile Broue
17.	Avenir S Chateauneuf En Thymerais	3-2 (a.e.t.)	Amicale Sours
18.	Amicale S Anet	1-7	Chartres Horizon F
19.	AS Corbeilles en Gatinais	0-6	FC Municipal Ingre
20.	Amicale Épernon	4-3	Entente S Maintenon Pierres F
21.	Etoile S Jouy St Prest	2-2 (5-4 p)	US La Chappelle St Mesmin
22.	Luisant AC	0-1	U Portugaise Sociale S Orleans
23.	Amicale de Luce F	1-2	US Municipale Montargis F
24.	US Beaune La Rolande	1-0	Avenir Ymonville
25.	Amicale Gallardon	1-3	CO de Cherisy
26.	Entente S Marigny Les Usages	2-1 (a.e.t.)	ACS Dreux de Football
27.	AS Tout Horizon Dreux	1-6	CA Pithiviers
28.	Comite Associatif National Portugais de Chartres	0-1	Entente Nancray Chambon Nibelle
29.	Entente S Nogent Le Roi	0-4	Entente S Gatinais Ferrieres
30.	SC Malesherbes	1-3	CS Mainvilliers F
31.	Esperance S du Moulon Bourges	0-2	FC St Jean Le Blanc
32.	US Sancerre	3-0 w/o	Entente S Marmagne Berry Buoy
33.	US Ste Solange	1-7	CS Municipal Sully Sur Loire
34.	RC Bouzy Les Bordes	3-1	A Salbris S
35.	US St Cyr En Val	1-3	US Ousson Sur Loire
36.	US Poilly Lez Gien	3-0	Gracay Genouilly S
37.	O Portugais Mehun Sur Yevre	1-2	J3 S Amilly
38.	US Municipale Olivet	5-0	CS Vignoux Sur Barangeon
39.	US La Ferte St Aubin	0-2	Gazelec S Bourges
40.	Diables Rouges Selles St Denis	2-0	CS Foecy
41.	US Dampierre En Burly	4-3	A Escale F Orleans
42.	S Loisirs Vasselay	1-3	Societe S La Solognote Souesmes
43.	O Mehunoius Mehun Sur Yevre	2-4 (a.e.t.)	AS St Germain Du Puy
44.	Entente S St Plantaire Cuzion Orsennes	1-3	Entente S Trouy
45.	Etoile S La Chatre Langlin	0-8	Bourges Foot
46.	US Le Pechereau	0-4	US Le Poinconnet
47.	US Dun Sur Auron	0-2	US Monteirchaume
48.	US Montgivray	0-1	US Argenton Sur Creuse
49.	Fraternelle et US St Benoit Du Sault	0-5	AS St Amandoise St Amand Montrond

Tie no	Home team (tier)	Score	Away team (tier)
50.	US Aigurande	0-4	FC St Doulchard
51.	US de Bitray Chateauroux	3-0 w/o	AS des Portugais Bourges
52.	AS Chapelloise	0-2	US La Chatre
53.	SC Chateauneuf Sur Cher	0-1	Entente AS Orval
54.	Ecole et C de F Bouzanne Vallee Noire	0-5	Amicale S St Gaultier Thenay
55.	AC Parnac Val d'Abloux	1-3 (a.e.t.)	FC Diors
56.	Vernou Neung Courmemin F	0-3 w/o	US St Pierre Des Corps
57.	Amicale des Jeunes du Secteur de Mont et Bracieux	2-1	Alerte S Montlouis Sur Loire
58.	FC Azay Sur Cher	0-2	Vineuil S
59.	FC Blere Val de Cher	4-4 (6-5 p)	US Portugais de Joue Les Tour
60.	AS Contres	0-1	US Selles Sur Cher
61.	FC Luant	0-4	C Amicale Montrichard
62.	Etoile S Poulaines	0-1	US St Maur
63.	US Reuilly	4-5	US Chambray Les Tours
64.	Etoile S de la Vallee Verte	0-2 (a.e.t.)	SA Issoudun
65.	US Pruniers	0-4	Entente Grand Champs Touvent Chateauroux
66.	US Billy	3-7	Joue Les Tours FC Touraine
67.	Langeais Cinq Mars F	2-1	AS Luynes
68.	Alerte S de Fondettes	3-1	JL Val de Creuse Pouligny St Pierre
69.	Centre Culturel et S Portugais Tours	3-3 (3-5 p)	St Georges Descartes
70.	AS Ingrandes	0-3	SC Azay Le Rideau - Cheille
71.	Alliance CS Buzancais	3-4	AS de l'Aubriere
72.	AS de la Vallee du Lys Pont	1-4 (a.e.t.)	US Villedie Sur Indre
73.	Esperance St Hippolyte	3-5	US Le Blanc
74.	FC Deolois Deols	2-0	AS Monts
75.	US Lignieres De Touraine	0-12	FC Richelieu
76.	Loches AC	3-3 (2-4 p)	FC Levroux
77.	AS de Villedome	2-3	Amicale S Nazelles Negron
78.	CS la Membrolle Sur Choisille	2-3	Etoile S La Ville Aux Dames
79.	ASL Orchaise	1-4	Avionnette Parcay Meslay FC
80.	JS Cormeray	0-8	Etoile Bleue St Cyr Sur Loire
81.	US Renaudine F	0-4	AFC Blois 1995
82.	ASC des Portugais Blois	4-2	AS Chouzy-Onzain
83.	FC Bouzignac	2-5	SC Tours Nord
84.	Etoile S Villebarou	0-2	AS Chanceaux Sur Choisille
85.	US Chitenay Cellettes	8-0	AC Amboisien Amboise
86.	Racing La Riche Tours	5-1	ASJ La Chaussee St Victor
87.	US Monnaie	2-2 (5-4 p)	Etoile S Oesienne Notre Dame D'Oe
88.	CS Bonneval	4-1	FC du Haut Vendomois
89.	Foyeur J Champhol	1-8	FCO St Jean De La Ruelle
90.	Santranges FC	2-3	Cerle Laique Bonny Sur Loire
91.	SC Massay	2-1	AS Nouan-Lamotte
92.	US Chateaumeillant	3-1	Avenir Lignieres
93.	Stade S Cluis	2-3	US St Florent Sur Cher
94.	Entente S Veretz Larcay	3-0	Sp C Vatan
95.	AC Villers Les Ormes	2-0	US Chemery Mehers St Romain
96.	FC du Val de Vienne	3-1	Entente S St Benoit La Foret
97.	J Amicale S Moulins Sur Cephons	1-1 (3-2 p)	FC Ste Maure-Maille
98.	FC Leves	1-6	C Deport Espagnol Orleans

=== Centre-West ===
These matches were played on 22 and 23 August 2015.

First round results: Centre-West

Tie no	Home team (tier)	Score	Away team (tier)
1.	AS Dompierre Bourgneuf FC 17	4-0	Stade Vouille
2.	AS Conceze	0-3	SC Verneuil Sur Vienne
3.	Entente S Celles-Verrines	6-0	FC Tonnacquois
4.	US Vasleenne	6-0	FC du Canton de Courcon
5.	FC St Yrieix La Perche	1-3	FC Argentacois
6.	US Anais	4-2	Amicale S Mignaloux Beauvoir
7.	US Chateauneuf	0-3 w/o	Entente S Brion St Secondin
8.	En Avant Charente Est	1-2	Entente S Marchoise Noth St Priest la Feuille
9.	Amicale J Montmoreau	3-0 w/o	Clerac Orignolles St Martin du Lary
10.	Etoile S Mornac	4-2	Esperance St Robertoise
11.	FC Roullet	0-1	US La Ferriere Airoux
12.	FC de Rouillac	1-6	FC Sevigne Jonzac St Germain
13.	USA Verdille	2-5	SC Chasseneuil Du Poitou
14.	US Aigrefeuille	4-1	Avenir Autize
15.	US Aulnay de Saintonge	1-3	U Fraternelle Barbezieux Barret
16.	CS Bussac Foret	3-1	Animation Loisirs St Brice
17.	La Jarrie FC	2-0 (a.e.t.)	FC Sud Gatine
18.	ES Thenacaise	4-2	Amicale S Merpins
19.	CS Allassacois	1-2	La Roche-Rivieres FC Tardoire
20.	Auvezere F 19	0-4	Mayotte FC de Limoges
21.	Cercle A Egletons	1-0	Entente F Aubussonnais
22.	Entente S Nonardaise	1-0	US Vigenal Bastide 87
23.	Entente S Ussel	3-1 (a.e.t.)	US St Leonard De Noblat
24.	CS Boussac	0-1	US Bessines-Morterolles
25.	ES Ardin	8-1	Entente S Surgeres
26.	FC Airvo St Jouin	4-5	US Thure Besse
27.	FC Boutonnais	2-5	La Rochelle Villeneuve FC
28.	Gati-Foot	3-0 w/o	FC Ste Soule
29.	ACG Foot Sud 86	4-2	FC Nersac
30.	SL Cenon Sur Vienne	3-3 (4-5 p)	Entente S Pinbrecieres
31.	US La Chapelle Viviers	1-3	St Ruffec
32.	US Payroux	4-4 (5-3 p)	JS Basseau Angoulême
33.	FC Rouille	2-1	FC Chice
34.	Esperance S St Benoit	1-2	Esperance Terves ES
35.	Stade S Sillars	1-3	Avenir Bellac - Berneuil - St Junien Les Combes
36.	AS de Valdivienne	2-1	US Lessac
37.	SC Verrieres	0-3	CO La Couronne
38.	US Entente Couzeix - Chaptelat	2-0	FC Ste Fortunade - Lagarde
39.	US Le Dorat	0-1	US St Field
40.	US Oradour Sur Glane	3-0 w/o	AS Seilhacoise
41.	AS St Junien	1-4	US Donzenacoise
42.	US d'Abzac	0-4	CA St Savin St Germain
43.	US Baignes	0-2	Amicale Laique FC Fontcouverte
44.	SC Mouthiers	5-0	Etoile S Chateau Larcher
45.	Entente S Nercillac Reparsac	0-8	US Pons
46.	JS Suris	4-0	US Versillacoise
47.	FC Atlantique	0-1	CS Beauvoir Sur Niort
48.	AF Presqu'ile d'Arvert	1-4 (a.e.t.)	U Amicale St Sulpice De Cognac
49.	FC Ocean de Bois En Re	3-1 (a.e.t.)	Amicale Rurale de Cherveux
50.	AS Cabariotaise	2-4	AS Portugais Niort
51.	Avenir S de la Baie	4-2	Club de Jeunes Pompaire les Loges
52.	A des Anciens de l'Avenir Maritime Laleu La Pallice	7-2	US Lezay
53.	AJS Lussant	1-3	Eveil F Le Tallud
54.	FC Montendre	1-4	US Brossac
55.	Entente S Muron Genouille	0-10	Avenir S Aifres
56.	JS Semussacaise	2-0	AS Grande Champagne Lignieres
57.	ES St Just Luzac	2-2 (4-2 p)	US Frontenay - St Symphorien
58.	St Palais S	5-2 (a.e.t.)	Jarnac S
59.	FC St Rogatien	9-1	Societe d'Education Populaire St Romans Les Melle
60.	Entente des Barrages de la Xaintrie	0-1 (a.e.t.)	US Solignac le Vigen
61.	CA Chamboulivois	1-0	Entente S Benevent Marsac
62.	US St Clementoise	2-3	FC St Brice Sur Vienne
63.	Societe S Ste Fereole	6-2	Esperance S La Courtine Crocq La Villeneuve
64.	FC St Jal	3-0 w/o	SC Sardentais
65.	Foyer Rural Education Populaire St Germain	3-4 (a.e.t.)	U Societes S Merinchal
66.	JS Chambonnaise	1-5	AS Chateauneuf Neuvic
67.	Entente S Dun - Naillat	0-1	Section A Le Palais Sur Vienne

Tie no	Home team (tier)	Score	Away team (tier)
68.	Entente S Evaux Budeliere	1-0 (a.e.t.)	FC Sauviat Sur Vige
69.	US Felletin	4-3	Amicale St Hilaire Venarsal
70.	US de Grand Bourg	3-0	AS Chambertoise
71.	Etoile S St Maurice La Souterraine	0-1	US Chasseneuil
72.	AS St Sulpice Le Gueretois	2-1	Limoges Landouge F
73.	US St Vaury Hopitaux Valette	2-3	JS Lafarge Limoges
74.	AS Soumans	3-4	AS Panazol
75.	Avenir 79 FC	3-3 (3-4 p)	Entente S Port Des Barques
76.	AS Le Beugnon Beceleuf Faye	3-0 w/o	FC Fouras St Laurent
77.	Entente S Bocage	1-0	FC Montamise
78.	ACS Mahorais F 79	2-4	AS Portugais Chatellerault
79.	Breuil Magne FC	1-3 (a.e.t.)	AS du Pays Mellois
80.	US Brion	4-2 (a.e.t.)	Boivre SC 2015
81.	Esperance S Brulain	1-9	FC Nord 17
82.	Buslaurs Thireuil	0-3 w/o	FC Aunisien Vouhe
83.	AS Portguais Cerizay	7-2	Le Reveil de Moncontour
84.	US Champdeniers-Pamplie	1-5	US Marennaise
85.	Societe Education Populaire La Concorde Exireuil	3-0 w/o	ESAB 96 FC
86.	Entente S Fayenoirterre	1-1 (5-4 p)	US Vivonne F
87.	SC L'Absie-Largeasse	7-1	FC Beurlay
88.	FC Haut Val de Sevre 94	0-4	Cap Aunis ASPTT FC
89.	Etoile S Louzy	1-4 (a.e.t.)	Entente S des Trois Cites Poitiers
90.	SA Mauze-Rigne	1-3	Antran S Loisirs
91.	US Mauze Sur le Mignon	1-4	Oleron FC
92.	Etoile S Mougon	0-3	Aunis Avenir FC
93.	UA Niort St Florent	2-1 (a.e.t.)	Rochefort FC
94.	FC Nueillaubiers	5-0	US Migne Auxances
95.	FC Pays de l'Ouin	3-0	FC Loudon
96.	Etoile S St Amand Sur Sevre	5-0	FC ASM
97.	CA St Aubin Le Cloud	0-3	AS Maritime de Nieul Sur Mer
98.	Elan S Aubinrothais	2-0	US de l'Envigne
99.	FC St Jean Misse	1-3 (a.e.t.)	US Vouille
100.	AS St Pierre Des Echaubrognes	2-0	US Mirebeau
101.	US St Varent Pierregeay	1-4	Elan S Oyre Dange
102.	Val de Boutonne F 79	3-1	Entente S Aunisienne d'Aytre
103.	US Vergentonnaise	3-0	CO St Genest
104.	Entente Voulmentin St Aubin La Coudre	5-3	US Nord Vienne
105.	US Vrere St Leger de Montbrun	1-4	US Melusine Lusignan
106.	FC Vrines	5-3	CS Naintre
107.	FC Pays Argentonnais	4-2	US Antoigne
108.	Esperance Availles en Chatellerault	0-1	US Courlay
109.	FC Cernay	0-5	SA Moncoutant
110.	Chabournay FC	2-2 (3-4 p)	Entente S Chanteloup-Chapelle
111.	CS Chatain	0-4	CS Leroy Angoulême
112.	AS Civaux	6-1	ASFC Vindelle
113.	Sud Vienne Region de Couhe	4-0	CS St Michel Sur Charente
114.	Coulombiers S	3-5	Cercle O Cerizay
115.	FC Fleure	2-1	AS Brie
116.	FC Fontaine Le Comte	1-1 (4-5 p)	Entente S Beaulieu - Breuil
117.	CS Islois	1-2	Amicale S Puymoyen
118.	US Jaunay Clan	0-1	Entente S St Cerbouille
119.	Etoile S Lhommaize	1-3	Etoile S Champniers
120.	JS Nieuil L'Espoir	2-3 (a.e.t.)	Amicale St Yrieix
121.	AS Cheminots Poitiers Biard	5-1 (a.e.t.)	Les Muguets Moutiers Sous Chantmerle
122.	AS Sèvres Anxaumont	2-0	AS Aigre
123.	CS St Georges Les Baillargeaux	1-4 (a.e.t.)	US Combranssiere
124.	A Amicale S St Julien L'Ars	1-3	Coqs Rouges Mansle
125.	Entente St Maurice Gencay	0-5	JS Sireuil
126.	US Usson Du Poitou	3-1	Etoile S Linars
127.	US Vicq Sur Gartempe	1-1 (5-6 p)	Entente S Elan Charentais
128.	AS Aiguille Bosmie Charroux	5-5 (5-4 p)}	AS St Martial De Gimel
129.	F Cognacois Cyrien Laurentais	3-2 (a.e.t.)	Etoile S Ussac
130.	AS St Louis Val de l'Aurence	1-1 (2-4 p)	FC du Confolentais
131.	US Nantiant	1-4	OFC de Ruelle
132.	AS Nexon	1-2	AS Beynat
133.	AS Nieul	5-2	O Larchois La Feuillade
134.	FC Canton d'Oradour Sur Vayres	0-6	AS Jugeals Noailles

=== Champagne-Ardenne ===
These matches were played on 21 and 23 August 2015.

First round results: Champagne-Ardenne

Tie no	Home team (tier)	Score	Away team (tier)
1.	Stade Briennois	1-4	JS Vaudoise
2.	St Menges US	1-2	Mouzon AS
3.	Bourg Rocroi	3-0 w/o	Flohimont FC
4.	Hannogne US	1-0	Les Ayvelles
5.	Maubert Fontaine	3-0 w/o	Fumay US
6.	Nouvion USC	3-2	Bogny FC
7.	Chateau Porcien	2-1	Asfeld AS
8.	Montherme CA	3-0 w/o	Givet USA
9.	Vrigne JS	4-0	Neuville This
10.	Flize US	3-5	Saulces Monclin
11.	Cheminots Charlevill	0-5	Haybes FC
12.	Sault Rethel	1-2	Liart/signy FC
13.	Glaire AS	1-2	Vouziers ES
14.	Vivarois SC	2-0	Balan US
15.	Revin US	1-1 (3-0 p)	Deux Vireux US
16.	Le Theux	1-4	Blagny Carignan
17.	Cheveuges	4-0	Messincourt
18.	Lumes AS	1-2	Douzy Qui Vive
19.	La Francheville	2-2 (1-3 p)	Auvillers Signy
20.	Deville US	0-1	Chooz FC
21.	Donchery FC	8-1	Charl. Frturc
22.	Margut US	2-5	Sedan Torcy
23.	Savieres SC	3-1	Ramerupt
24.	Vallant Fontaine	0-1	Essor Melda
25.	Barsuraube FC	4-0	Troyes Port Char
26.	Bagneux Clesles	2-1 (a.e.t.)	Romilly Sports
27.	Romilly Portugais	3-3 (3-5 p)	Rosieres Om.
28.	Foot 2000	3-0 w/o	Luyeres Et.S
29.	Troyes Asptt	1-0	Vendeuvre US
30.	A.S.O.F.A.	1-1 (3-4 p)	Maizieres Chatres
31.	Portugais Nogent	1-2 (a.e.t.)	Olympi Chapelain
32.	Troyes Municipaux	3-0 w/o	Nogentaise Uscn
33.	Lusigny Etoile	1-0	Trois Vallees
34.	Montieramey	2-4	Dienville US
35.	Bazancourt SC	1-2	Witry Les Reims
36.	Betheny Formation	1-3	Reims Murigny Franco
37.	FC De La Vesle	1-2	Reims Chalet Tunisie
38.	Reims Celtic	3-1	Reims Orgeval
39.	Reims Jamin Amicale	1-2	Nord Champagne
40.	Reims Mahoraise	1-4	Cernay Berru Lavanne

Tie no	Home team (tier)	Score	Away team (tier)
41.	Rs Val Murigny	0-3 w/o	Esperance Rèmoise
42.	Sillery FC	2-0	Reims Neuvillette
43.	St Brice Courcelles	0-3	Reims Christo
44.	Fismes US	0-1	CS Ageen
45.	Dormans SC	0-5	Avize Grauves
46.	Fere Champenoise	0-10	Sezanne RC
47.	Gaye ES	1-3	Connantre Corroy
48.	Oiry US	2-1 (a.e.t.)	Cote Des Blancs
49.	Pierry Moussy	1-2 (a.e.t.)	Montmirail SC
50.	St Martin Ablois	1-6	Esternay US
51.	Dizy US	0-3 w/o	St Martin La Veuve
52.	Argonne FC	5-0	Courtisols Estan
53.	La ChaussÉe/marne	2-6	Fagnieres ES
54.	Bignicourt/saulx	0-1	Pargny S/saulx
55.	Couvrot US	3-0 w/o	Vit/champ Man
56.	Loisy S/marne	2-1	Faux Vesigneul Pogny
57.	Maurupt AS	0-3	Sermaize USS
58.	Marolles AS	3-2	Cheminon AS
59.	Somsois Margerie	1-6	Vitry FC
60.	Prez SS Lafauche	0-1	Poissons Noncourt
61.	Voillecomte US	1-0 (a.e.t.)	Valcourt AF
62.	Froncles AS	0-8	Fc Joinville Vecqueville
63.	Villiers En Lieu	2-2 (4-5 p)	Bragard Cheminots
64.	Diane D Eurville	2-1	Montier En Der
65.	Lasarjonc AS	2-0	Arc En Barrois
66.	Bologne FC	3-2	Bricon Orges
67.	Doulaincourt	0-5	Esnouveaux AS
68.	Bourmont AC	1-3	Sarrey Montigny
69.	Biesles US	0-3	Asptt Chaumont
70.	Bourbonne US	1-0	Prauthoy Vaux
71.	Laville Aux Bois FC	0-6	Rolampont Ca
72.	Chalindrey Cheminots	0-2	Langres Co
73.	Corgirnon Chaudenay	2-3	Neuilly L Eveque
74.	Fayl Billot Hortes	2-1	Sts Geosmes
75.	Remilly Aillicourt	1-0	Floing FC

=== Franche-Comté ===
These matches were played on 22 and 23 August 2015.

First round results: Franche-Comté

Tie no	Home team (tier)	Score	Away team (tier)
1.	FC Seloncourt	2-0	St Loup Corbenay Magnoncourt
2.	ES La Jeanne d'Arc Myon-Chay Intercommunal	0-1	SC Villers Le Lac
3.	AS Levier	5-0	Etoile S Doubs
4.	SC Municipal Valdoie	0-3 w/o	AS Baume Les Dames
5.	US des Ecorces	1-1 (4-5 p)	FC Giro Lepuix
6.	US Montbeliardaise	3-0	AS Audincourt
7.	Poligny Grimont FC	1-1 (4-3 p)	US Coteaux de Seille
8.	FC de Mouchard Arc et Senans	3-1	US Trois Monts
9.	AS Pierrefontaine et Laviron	0-4	FC Morteau Montlebon
10.	Promo S Besançon	1-0	FC de Vesoul
11.	US Nancray Osse	0-6	FC de L'Isle Sur Le Doubs
12.	AS D'Ornans	2-2 (6-5 p)	ASC Planois St Ferjeux
13.	RC Voujeaucourt	2-0	SC Jussey
14.	RC Champey	3-3 (3-5 p)	A des Amities Franco Turques
15.	FC Breuches	4-2	Entente S Haute Lizaine
16.	AS Danjoutin Andelnans Meroux	3-1	AS de Rougegoutte
17.	FC Haute Vallee de l'Ognon	3-4	FC Villars Sous Ecot
18.	Entente S Pays Maichois	5-0	AS Presentevillers Ste Marie
19.	SC Longevelle	4-2 (a.e.t.)	Maison des Jeunes de Jasney
20.	US de Pusey	1-3	S Genereaux Hericourt
21.	JS Luronnes	2-2 (2-4 p)	Etoile S Exincourt Taillecourt
22.	ASL Autechaux Roide	3-1	AS d'Herimoncourt
23.	US Chatenois Les Forges	2-2 (5-4 p)	AS Mezire Fesches le Chatel
24.	AS Melisey St Barthelemy	0-1	O Montbellard FC
25.	AS Morbier F	0-2	Bresse Jura F
26.	E des Auxon Miserey	0-5	US Scey Sur Saône
27.	Etoile Marnaysienne	1-2 (a.e.t.)	Jura Nord F
28.	O de Montmorot	1-3	FC Aiglepierre
29.	FC Courlaoux Valsaorne	1-6	Jura Lacs F
30.	RC Chaux Du Dombief	1-2	Amicale S Vaux Les St Claude
31.	FC de Colombe	4-3	Esperance Arc Les Gray
32.	US de Crotenay Combe d'Ain	0-0 (3-5 p)	FC Champagnole
33.	FC Lac Remoray Vaux	2-3	FC Cantonal La Joux Nozeroy
34.	A Serre Franois Chemaudin	3-0	FC Rochefort Amange
35.	AS Foucherans	0-2	Entente Sud Revermont Cousance St Amou
36.	FC Massif Haut Doubs	2-3	FC Val de Loue
37.	Promo Sport Dole Crissey	4-2	AS de Beure
38.	US Avanne	3-3 (4-3 p)	US de Velesmes Echevanne

Tie no	Home team (tier)	Score	Away team (tier)
39.	US Rigny	0-2	US St Vit
40.	AS Travesienne	1-2	ASC de Velotte Besançon
41.	Drugeon Sports	2-5	Thise Chalezeule FC
42.	Entente S Entre Roches	1-2	US Rioz Etuz Cussey
43.	FC Pirey Ecole Valentin	6-2 (a.e.t.)	AEP Etoile de Pouilley Les Vignes
44.	ES Les Fonges 91	1-4	CS de Frasne
45.	ES Les Sapins	1-2	US Larians Et Muna
46.	Etoile Saugette La Chaux De Gilley	2-3	AS du Chateau de Joux
47.	Concorde Rougemont	0-2	FC Chatillon Devecey
48.	US Les Fontenelles	1-5	AS d'Orchamps Vennes
49.	Amancey Bolandoz Chantrans Foot	3-3 (2-3 p)	AS Avoudrey
50.	Etoile S de Charquemont	1-4	AS Mont D'Usiers
51.	Etoile S Combeaufontaine Lavoncourt Laitre	0-1	FC Noidanais
52.	ASC Soma Tsara Mahoraise Besançon	4-1	AS Saône Mamirolle
53.	A Travailleurs Turcs Pontarlier	0-10	SC Clemenceau Besançon
54.	AS Besançon Esperance F	0-3	FC Valdahon Vercel
55.	AS Frambouhans	0-4 (a.e.t.)	FC de Montfaucon-Morre-Gennes
56.	US des Pres de Vaux Besançon	2-1	CS Portusien
57.	Etoile S de Montenois	1-1 (3-2 p)	AS Luxeuil
58.	AS Essert	3-0 w/o	S Reunis Delle
59.	US Arcey	1-0	AS Nord Territoire
60.	Bessoncourt Roppe C. Lariviere	3-4 (a.e.t.)	Vallee du Breuchin FC
61.	CS Beaucourt	3-4 (a.e.t.)	AS Bavilliers
62.	US St Hippolyte	1-4	FC des Forges d'Audincourt
63.	SC Courchaton	3-1	AS Valentigney
64.	FC Le Russey	2-1	US Sous Roches Valentigney
65.	FC Courtelevant	1-5	FC Bart
66.	AS Fougerollaise	1-8	FC Grandvillars
67.	F Animation C de Lougres	2-2 (4-5 p)	FC du Pays Minier
68.	US Passavant	0-6	US de Sochaux
69.	O Courcelles Les Montbeliard	2-1	AS de Chevremont
70.	CSS Val d'Amour Mont Sous Vaudrey	0-2	Triangle d'Or Jura Foot
71.	Etoile S de Sirod	1-2 (a.e.t.)	FC Damparis
72.	ASPTT Grand Lons Jura	0-8	RC Lons Le Saunier
73.	Entente S Audeux Emagny	1-3	AS Perrousienne
74.	FC Brenne-Orain	2-4	FC 4 Rivieres 70
75.	AS Jura Dolois F	4-1	Entente S Dannemarie

=== Languedoc-Roussillon ===
These matches were played between 22 and 30 August 2015.

First round results: Languedoc-Roussillon

Tie no	Home team (tier)	Score	Away team (tier)
1.	Av S Roussonnais	3-0 w/o	AS des Portugais de Lozere
2.	FC De Cruviers Lascours	1-4	FC Chusclan Laudun l'Ardoise
3.	FC Sussargues	0-0 (5-6 p)	US Lunel Viel
4.	AS Randonnaise	0-3	EntS Des communes Le Buisson
5.	FC Malepère	0-1	FC Alzonnais
6.	Etoile S Arzenaise	6-1	FC Berriac
7.	Entente Naurouze SU Labastidienne	7-0	Foyer Rural de la Vallee du Cougain
8.	Etolie S Ste Eulalie Villeseque	0-0 (3-2 p)	Razès Olympique
9.	RC Badens Rustiques	0-2	AS Bramaise
10.	Etoile S Fanjeaux La Piege	1-0	FC Alaric
11.	Haut-Minervois Olympique	3-0 w/o	FC Caux-et-Sauzens
12.	FC Pennautier	2-5	FC Chalabre
13.	FC de Villegly	1-0	US Montagne Noire
14.	FC Luc	2-2 (1-4 p)	Limoux Pieusse FC
15.	FC Villeneucois	3-0 w/o	AS Lezignan Foot
16.	O de Moussan Montredon	1-3	MJC Gruissan
17.	US Salhersienne	4-1	AS Saissac Cabardes
18.	Trapel FC	3-2	UFC Narbonnais
19.	FC Villedubertois	1-3	Trebes FC
20.	FC St Nazairois	6-0	ASC Villalier
21.	US du Minervois	4-1	USA Penezoise
22.	FC de la Vallee du Lauqet	2-1	FC Haute Vallee
23.	Societe Omnisport St Papoul	4-0	Souilhe FC
24.	O Cuxac D'Aude	0-7	AS Puissalicon Magalas
25.	Olympique d'Alenya	0-1	Cabestay OC
26.	Baho Pezilla FC	1-9	Elne FC
27.	FC des Asppres Banyuls Dels Aspres	0-8	AS Perpignan
28.	Ceret Maureillas FC	1-4	FC Stephanois
29.	O du Haut Vallespir	0-3 w/o	FC Cerdagne Font Romeu Capcir
30.	Le Boulou St Jean Pla de Corts FC	1-2	Ille Sur Tet FC
31.	FC St Cyprien Latour	3-0	Albertes Côte Vermeille F
32.	FC St Feliu d'Avall	3-0 w/o	AFC Perpignan
33.	AS Prades F	6-1	Saleilles OC
34.	Stade O Rivesaltais	1-4	FC Thuirinois
35.	FC St Laurent de la Salanque	0-0 (3-4 p)	BECE FC Vallee de l'Agly
36.	FC Villelongue	5-0	Theza Olympiqeu
37.	US Bedaricienne Pays d'Orb Gravezon	1-3	US Béziers
38.	FC Aspiranais	3-0 w/o	US Multiculturelle Agathoise
39.	Bouzigues Loupian AC	1-3	Castelnau le Cres FC
40.	Crabe S Marseillanais (Note: Crabe S Marseillanais subsequently penalised and removed from competition. AS Atlas Paillade awarded victory)	4-1	AS Atlas Paillade
41.	USO Florensac Pinet	1-1 (6-5 p)	En Avant Cers F
42.	Entente S Fraisse la Salvetat	4-7	Entente Corneilhan Lignan FC
43.	ASPTT de Lunel	0-3 w/o	AS St Martin Montpellier
44.	ASPTT Montpellier	3-0 w/o	St Lunaret Nord US
45.	FC de Neffies	1-3	Arsenal Croix d'Argent FC
46.	AS les Pierrots de Teyrna	3-0 w/o	A Carrefour des Civilisations
47.	O Marussanais Biterrois	0-3	US Montagnacoise
48.	Etoile S Nezignanaise	4-1	FC Serviannais
49.	Premian FC	2-0	Avenir S Sang et Or 34
50.	AS Roujan Caux	3-2	FCO Valras Serignan
51.	US Villeveyracoise	2-4	Aurore St Gilloise

Tie no	Home team (tier)	Score	Away team (tier)
52.	FC Rodilhan	0-3 w/o	A Espoir et Culture St Gilles
53.	AS Badaroux	0-3	AS St Privat
54.	FC Canabier	1-2	FC Val de Ceze
55.	AS Salindroise	1-3	US Monobletoise
56.	ES Tresquoise	0-3 w/o	Entente S Rochefort Signargues
57.	O Minier Pontil Pradel	1-7	AS St Christol Lez Ales
58.	Avenir S Tarn et du Tarnon	2-1 (a.e.t.)	FC des Cevennes
59.	Vaillante Aumonaise	2-0	AS du Canton de Fournel
60.	Entente Chirac le Monastier	3-4	Stade St Barbe La Grand Combe
61.	Valdonnez FC	0-3 w/o	AS St Julien Les Rosiers
62.	ASC le Refuge	3-2	AS Chastelloise
63.	AS Le Malzieu	1-6	AS St Georges De Levejac
64.	FC Pays Viganais Aigoual	6-0	Valdegour
65.	Auzonnet FC	0-7	RC St Laurent Des Arbres
66.	FC Vauverdois	3-0 w/o	Entente S Nîmes Courbessac
67.	AS Poulx	3-0 w/o (Note: Game abandoned at 0-0 due to thunderstorm. FC Pont St Esprit subsequently found to have fielded ineligible players, and were excluded from the competition, with AS Poulx awarded victory)	FC Pont St Esprit
68.	O Midi Lirou Béziers Mediterranee	0-5	Meze Stade FC
69.	Salanca FC	2-1	US de Bompas
70.	USA Canauloise	2-0	FCO Domessargues
71.	FC Solerien	1-1 (4-2 p)	Si T'es S Perpignan
72.	FC de Maurin	0-2	O Lapeyrade FC
73.	Entente S Coeur Herault	0-2	AS Canetoise
74.	Red Star O Cournonterral	5-2 (a.e.t.)	AC Alignanais
75.	SO Lansarguois	1-3	Point d'Interrogation Vendarguois
76.	Ballon S Cournonsecois	1-2	Avenir Castroite
77.	US des Basses Cevennes	7-2	ASC Paillade Mercure
78.	FC Lamalou Les Bains	2-4	Avenir S Gignacois
79.	Avenir S Juvignac	4-2	SC de Jacou
80.	FC Pradeen	0-0 (6-5 p)	FC Montpellier Cevennes
81.	Pompignane S et Culture	1-3	Pointe Courte AC Sete
82.	Reveil S Gigeannais	3-1	FC Laverune
83.	AS Pignan	7-1	Entente S Perols
84.	FC St Pargoirien	1-1 (11-10 p)	St Montblanais F
85.	SC St Thiberien	2-3	ROC Social Sete
86.	US Villeneuvoise	2-5	AS Montarnaud St Paul Vaihauques Murviel
87.	RC Vedasien	3-1	FC Portiragnes
88.	Emulation S Le Grau Du Roi	0-3	Stade O Aimargues
89.	OC Bellegarde	1-6	RC Generac
90.	Entente S Les Trois Moulins	0-0 (2-4 p)	FC Langlade
91.	Stade O Codognan	3-4	US du Trefle
92.	Gallia C Quissacois	0-5	Omnisports St Hilaire la Jasse
93.	Margeride FC	2-2 (5-6 p)	Entente S Rimeize F
94.	O Fourquesien	3-4	Gazelec S Gardois
95.	US Bouillargues	14-1	Sedisud FC Ales
96.	SC Castanet Nîmes	9-0	O Mageois
97.	Gallia C Gallarguois	1-2	AS St Paulet
98.	SC Manduellois	3-0	Etoile S Thezieroise
99.	Remoulins FC	1-3	AS Nîmes Athletic
100.	Besseges St Ambroix FC	2-0	SC Nimois
101.	Etoile S Sumenoise	0-2	OC Redessan
102.	Gallia C de Gallician	0-5	Entente S Pays d'Uzes

=== Maine ===
These matches were played on 23 August 2015.

First round results: Maine

Tie no	Home team (tier)	Score	Away team (tier)
1.	US La Bigottiere - Alexain	0-2	US Aronnaise
2.	Brece S	0-12	L'Erneenne
3.	US Chantrigne	1-5	AS Gorronnaise
4.	Laval FC	0-3 w/o	Hermine St Ouennaise
5.	LM FC	0-5	AS Omnisport Montenay
6.	US Desertines	0-3 w/o	Amicale S Andouille
7.	AS Bree	2-6	CA Evronnais
8.	AS La Baconniere	3-1	Voltiguers St Georges Buttavent
9.	AS Neau	0-1	USC Pays de Montsurs
10.	FC Ambrieres Les Vallees	3-2	US Pre En Pail
11.	SC Hamois	0-6	US Cigne
12.	US Argentreenne	0-1	AS Contest St Baudelle
13.	FC Landivy Pontmain	0-2	US Fougerolles Du Plessis
14.	CA Voutreen	1-1 (6-7 p)	CS Javron Neuilly
15.	AS Martigne Sur Mayenne	0-4	FC Lassay
16.	Francs Sonneurs Champgeneteux	0-3 w/o	US du Pays de Juhel
17.	FC Montjeannais	3-2	CS St Pierre Des Landes
18.	AS Parne Sur Roc	0-3	Francs Archers de la Bonne Lorraine
19.	US Ballots	0-8	Entente S Craonnaise
20.	AS St Aignan Sur Roe	1-7	US St Berthevin les Laval
21.	AS Vaiges	1-3	AS Meslay Du Maine
22.	US Simple Marigne Peuton	4-1	US Meral Cosse le Vivien
23.	Entente S Pommerieux	0-4	US Lavalloise
24.	US de Livre La Touche	0-10	ASL L'Huisserie F
25.	US Renazeenne	2-1	Alerte Ahuille
26.	Bierne Gennes FC	1-3	FC Chateau Gontier
27.	AS Loigne Sur Mayenne	2-1	FC Ruille-Loiron
28.	US Athee	3-3 (3-5 p)	Etoile S Quelainaise
29.	Jeanne d'Arc Soulge Sur Ouette	5-1	US Entrammaise
30.	Alerte S Ballee	0-7	US Forceenne
31.	FC Menil	2-1	Jenue Garde Coudray
32.	FC La Selle Craonaise	3-0	Avant Garde Laigne
33.	AS Cuille - St Poix	0-14	Amicale S Le Bourgneuf La Foret
34.	Etoile S Beaulieu Sur Oudon	1-2	US Le Genest
35.	US Villiers Charlemagne	1-3	US Dyonisienne
36.	ASPTT Laval	3-6	US St Pierre La Cour

Tie no	Home team (tier)	Score	Away team (tier)
37.	JS Allonnes	0-3 w/o	JS Parigne L'Eveque
38.	Gazelec S du Mans	2-5	US Sille Le Guillaume
39.	US Luceenne	0-3 w/o	Avenir S Ruaudin
40.	AS Lamnay	1-7	CS Change
41.	FC Val du Loir	0-2	Esperance S Yvre L'Eveque
42.	US Savigne l'Eveque	2-1	JS Ludoise
43.	Lonbron S	0-2	US La Chapelle St Remy
44.	FC St Corneille	1-5	US Vibraysienne
45.	Entente S St Georges Du Bois	1-3	Stade O du Maine
46.	US Precigne	3-1	US des Glonnieres
47.	AS Cures	0-3	La Vigilante de Mayet
48.	US Mansigne	3-0	Cercle O Laigne St Gervais
49.	US Regionale La Quinte	0-3	US Tennie St Symphorien
50.	Amicale S du Chedouet	0-1	ASPTT Le Mans
51.	C Omnisport Cormes	1-3	US Bouloire
52.	AS Fye	0-2	AS Cerans Foulletourte
53.	US Yvre Le Polin	1-5	C Omnisport Casetelorien
54.	Amicale S Sargeenne	0-2	US St Mars La Briere
55.	AS Neuville Sur Sarthe	0-2	AS St Pavace
56.	Groupe S Intercommunal du Saosnois	0-15	Patriote Brulonnaise
57.	AS Etival Les Le Mans	0-4	Beaumont SA
58.	US Challoise	1-5	SC Tuffe
59.	Elan S Dissayen	0-2	JS Solesmienne
60.	AS La Milesse	2-5	SA Mamertins
61.	AS Juigne Sur Sarthe	3-1	US Rouesse Vasse
62.	FC La Bazoge	2-7	US Roeze
63.	Esperance S Cherre	3-3 (6-7 p)	Amicale S La Chapelle St Aubin
64.	AS St Jean d'Asse	2-2 (3-4 p)	Etoile de la Germiniere
65.	US Conlie	2-1	Dollon Omnisports
66.	Esperance S Montfort Le Gesnois	1-3	CS Sablons Gazonfier
67.	AS Thorigne Sur Due	0-1	CA Loue
68.	Aero SC St Cosme En Vairais	0-4	US Crosmieroise
69.	US La Chapelle d'Aligne	0-5	US Bazouges Cre Sur Loir
70.	Esperance S Champfleur	1-6	La Patriote Bonnetable
71.	La Francaise de Pontvallain	2-3	Societe S Noyen Sur Sarthe
72.	US St Ouen St Biez	1-6	UC Auvers Le Hamon - Poille Sur Vegre

=== Méditerranée ===
These matches were played on 29 and 30 August 2015.

First round results: Méditerranée

Tie no	Home team (tier)	Score	Away team (tier)
1.	SC Gadagnien	2-2 (1-3 p)	O Novais
2.	Carnoux FC	1-1 (2-3 p)	Six Fours le Brusc FC
3.	Avenir C Avignonnais	2-3	US Entraiguoise
4.	US St Mandriere	1-2	Stade O Londais
5.	FC de Sisteron	3-1 (a.e.t.)	SC Vinon Durance
6.	US Veynoise SNCF F	3-3 (2-4 p)	Alliance S valensole Greoux
7.	CA Digne 04 F	4-3	US Ste Tulle
8.	Barcelonnette FC	4-1	AS Forcalquier
9.	Entente Provencale de Manosque	1-2	US Meenne
10.	AS Embrunaise	0-2	Gap Foot 05
11.	AS Roquefortaise	3-8	Club des Jeunes Antibes F
12.	US Biotoise	0-1	AS Roquebrune Cap Martin
13.	AS de la Roya	2-4	ASPTT Nice
14.	Etoile S Contoise	1-3	FC de Mougins Côte d'Azur
15.	St Paul La Colle Omninsport C	3-0 w/o	Cercle A Peymeinadois
16.	Drap Football	0-1 (a.e.t.)	Stade Laurentin St Laurent Du Var
17.	US Valbonne Sophia Antipolis	4-4 (5-6 p)	FC Pugetois
18.	O Suquetan Cannes Croisette	0-3 w/o	Entente St Sylvestre Nice Nord
19.	Trinite SFC	2-0	US Cannes Bocca O
20.	FC de Carros	2-2 (3-0 p)	AS Vencoise
21.	US Cap D'Ail	1-0	FC Beausoleil
22.	Stade de Vallauris	0-0 (5-4 p)	AS de la Fontonne Antibes
23.	Euro African Association	0-4	FC d'Antibes Juan les Pins
24.	Mayotte sur la Côte d'Azur	0-3 w/o	Etoile S Villeneuve Loubet
25.	OC Blausasc	0-1	Montet Bornala C Nice
26.	Entente S Haute Siagne	4-2	Racines du Cap Vert
27.	FC Villefranchois	5-1	Entente Conque Madeleine Victorine
28.	US Pegomas	1-0	SC Cogolinois
29.	CA Plan De Cuques Maison de Jeunes et te la Culture	2-4 (a.e.t.)	US 1er Canton
30.	SC St Cannat	2-4 (a.e.t.)	FSC La ciotat
31.	Etoile S de La Ciotat	1-1 (3-0 p)	Etoile S Milloise
32.	FC de l'Etoile et de l'Huveaune	2-1	Luynes S
33.	Avenir Simiane Collongue	15-0	AS Ste Marguerite
34.	A Regard d'Avenir Multiculturel	4-1	AS Rognac
35.	AS Bouc Bel Air	3-0 w/o	US Eguillenne
36.	ASC Vivaux Sauvagere 10eme	0-3 w/o	AC Port de Bouc
37.	AS de l'Etoile du Sud	5-0	AS Belsunce Ara
38.	CA Croix Sainte	1-5	AS Busserine
39.	Entente S du Bassin Minier	1-2	Etoile S de Greasque
40.	FC Istres Rassuen	1-4	Stade Marseillais Universite C
41.	FC Septemes	4-0	US Farenque
42.	FC St Mitre Les Remparts	1-2	JS des Pennes Mirabeau
43.	FO Ventabrennais	0-3	JO St Gabriel

Tie no	Home team (tier)	Score	Away team (tier)
44.	USPEG Marseille	4-0	JS Puy Ste Reparade
45.	JS Istreenne	2-1	ASC St Marcel
46.	SA St Antoine	0-3 w/o	JS St Julien
47.	AS Martigues Sud	2-1	ARC Cavaillon
48.	US Pelican	3-5	ASC de Jeunesse Felix Pyat
49.	SC Montredon Bonneveine	0-1	US Venelloise
50.	SO Cassis	3-0 w/o	Stade St Serrois Puyloubier
51.	Entente S Salins De Giraud	5-6 (a.e.t.)	FC Chateauneuf Les Martigues
52.	FC Lauris	0-3 w/o	US Eygalieres
53.	AS Piolencoise	4-6 (a.e.t.)	FA Chateaurenard
54.	O de Barbentane	1-2	Esperance Sorguaise
55.	Etoile S Boulbon	3-0	FC Carpentras
56.	US Avignonnaise	2-1	Avenir S Camaretois
57.	Racing Blondel Bollenois	0-4	Dentelles FC
58.	FC Luberon	5-1	ASC Franco Turque d'Avignon
59.	JS Lourmarinoise	1-2	Entente Jeunesse Galia C Graveson
60.	Boxeland C Islois	5-1	US Thoroise
61.	SC Jonquierois	4-0	AS Drome Provence
62.	Entente S Pierredon Mouries	0-2	Calavon FC
63.	RC de Provence	2-0	SC Manzanais
64.	Entente St Jean du Gres	3-0	FC Aureillois
65.	US St Saturninoise	2-3	AS des Catalans de Tarascon
66.	FC Tarascon	2-0	US Renaissance Pertuisienne
67.	US Une Autre Provence	4-4 (3-2 p)	Avenir S Violesien
68.	L'Etoile d'Aubune	1-3	Stade Maillanais
69.	ACS Morieres Les Avignon	1-3	O Montelais
70.	SC Montfavet	1-0	SC Orange
71.	FC Vidauban	1-0	Stade Transian
72.	FC Ramatuellois	0-1	Entente FC Seynois
73.	SC Nansais	0-3	O St Maximinois
74.	SO Lavandou	2-0	FC Pays De Fayence
75.	Le Val Bessilon	3-1 (a.e.t.)	FCUS Tropezienne
76.	Avenir S Mar Vivo	3-4	Pays d'Aix FC
77.	AS Brignolaise	0-6	AS de l'Esterel
78.	AS Callas Canton	0-1	Bormes Mimosas S
79.	Commerce Cooperatif	0-3 w/o	ASPTT Hyeres
80.	Entente du Haut Var	2-2 (6-5 p)	Etoile S Zacharienne
81.	Sollies Farlede	2-1	JS Beaussetanne
82.	Etoile de Claret Montety	1-6	FC La Ciotat Ceyreste
83.	ASC Jonquet les Routs	2-3	SC Dracenie
84.	FA Val Durance	3-0	AC Vedenois
85.	Societe S Lamanonaise	1-8	AS Mazargues
86.	Etoile S Lorguaise	4-1	US du Val d'Issole
87.	A Amicale S Val St Andre	3-0 w/o	US et Culturelle des Minots du Panier
88.	S Loisirs Hospital Intercommunal Toulon Seyne Mer	3-1	AS Arcoise
89.	O Avignonnais	3-0	US Caderoussienne

=== Rhône-Alpes ===
These matches were played on 21, 22, 23 and 30 August 2015.

First round results: Rhône-Alpes (incomplete)

Tie no	Home team (tier)	Score	Away team (tier)
1.	AS Chaveyriat	5-3 (a.e.t.)	FC Priay
2.	SO Pont Cheruy	4-2	FC Val'Lyonnais
3.	ES Ambronay St J Vx	1-3	FC Lescheroux St J
4.	JS Irigny	5-4	US Loire S/Rhone
5.	Belley CS	0-1	FC Nivolet
6.	FC Chainaz	0-5	FC Cluses
7.	Olympique de Cran	2-1	EntS Thyez
8.	Villerest US	0-3	Commelle FC
9.	St Romai.Pope	2-2 (4-2 p)	Lamure/azergues
10.	Bussieres US	2-3	Fleurie Villi

== Second round ==
=== Mayotte ===
These matches were played on 11 April 2015.

Second round results: Mayotte

Tie no	Home team (tier)	Score	Away team (tier)
1.	(Mayotte) Bandrélé foot	1–3	Etincelles Hamjago (Mayotte)
2.	(Mayotte) AJ Kani-kéli	0–0 (4–3 p)	ASJ Handréma (Mayotte)
3.	(Mayotte) AS Racine du nord	1–0	Miracle du sud (Mayotte)
4.	(Mayotte) FC Sohoa	1–2 (a.e.t.)	USC Labattoir (Mayotte)
5.	(Mayotte) ASCEE Nyambadao	1–6	AS Rosador (Mayotte)
6.	(Mayotte) UCS Sada	3–1	FC Dembéni (Mayotte)
7.	(Mayotte) ASC Kawéni	3–2 (a.e.t.)	AS Sada (Mayotte)
8.	(Mayotte) FCO Tsingoni	1–3	ASC Abeilles M'tsamboro (Mayotte)
9.	(Mayotte) Tchanga SC	3–1	US Mtsagamboua (Mayotte)
10.	(Mayotte) US Mtsamoudou	1–4	Diables noirs (Mayotte)
11.	(Mayotte) FC Chiconi	1–0	ASJ Moinatrindri (Mayotte)
12.	(Mayotte) AS Jumeaux de M'zouazia	3–2 (a.e.t.)	Foudre 2000 (Mayotte)
13.	(Mayotte) Voulvavi sports	2–0	Feu du centre (Mayotte)
14.	(Mayotte) RC Barakani	2–3	AS Neige (Mayotte)
15.	(Mayotte) Flamme Hajangoua	2–1	USCJ Koungou (Mayotte)
16.	(Mayotte) VCO Vahibé	2–2 (2–4 p)	FC Mtsapéré (Mayotte)

=== Guadeloupe ===
These match played on 28, 29, 30 August and 12, 13 September 2015.

Second round results: Guadeloupe

Tie no	Home team (tier)	Score	Away team (tier)
1.	(Guadeloupe) A.O. Gourbeyrienne	3–4	E. de Morne à L'Eau (Guadeloupe)
2.	(Guadeloupe) AS Le Moule	0–3	US Baie Mahaultienne (Guadeloupe)
3.	(Guadeloupe) ASC Le Siroco Les Abymes	0–1	AC de Marie Galante (Guadeloupe)
4.	(Guadeloupe) AV. Saint Rosien	3–3 (4–3 p)	AS RC de Basse Terre (Guadeloupe)
5.	(Guadeloupe) ASC Red Star de Point	0–0 (4–3 p)	Solidaritè Scolaire CS (Guadeloupe)
6.	(Guadeloupe) USC de Bananier	1–0	U. Artistes du Raizet (Guadeloupe)
7.	(Guadeloupe) Cactus Sainte Anne	3–2	US Grande Borgeoise (Guadeloupe)
8.	(Guadeloupe) Juvenis	2–1	La Frégate (Guadeloupe)

Tie no	Home team (tier)	Score	Away team (tier)
9.	(Guadeloupe) An Jeunesse Evolution	0–2	Arsenal C. (Guadeloupe)
10.	(Guadeloupe) CS Le Moule	3–0	AS Nenuphars (Guadeloupe)
11.	(Guadeloupe) Gauloise de Basse Terre	3–0	Evolucas Lamentin (Guadeloupe)
12.	(Guadeloupe) US Sainte Rose	3–0	C.Am. Marquisat Capesterre (Guadeloupe)
13.	(Guadeloupe) Phare Petit du Canal	1–0	CS Capesterre Belle Eau (Guadeloupe)
14.	(Guadeloupe) ASC Juventus Sainte Anne	6–0	CS Bouillantais (Guadeloupe)
15.	(Guadeloupe) Mondial Club	0–2	CS Saint-Francǫis (Guadeloupe)
16.	(Guadeloupe) Saint-Claude FC	1–3	J.S. Abymienne (Guadeloupe)

=== Réunion ===
These matches were played on 2 and 3 May 2015.

Second round results: Réunion

Tie no	Home team (tier)	Score	Away team (tier)
1.	(Réunion) SC St-François	0–6	Saint-Pauloise FC (Réunion)
2.	(Réunion) AS Etoile du Sud	3–2 (a.e.t.)	SC Chaudron (Réunion)
3.	(Réunion) SS La Capricorne	4–0	AS Evêché (Réunion)
4.	(Réunion) JS Champbornoise	1–6	JS Piton Saint-Leu (Réunion)
5.	(Réunion) SS Saint-Louisienne	5–0	AS Ste-Rose (Réunion)
6.	(Réunion) Ent. Ste Suzanne Bagatelle	1–0	FC Parfin (Réunion)
7.	(Réunion) CS St-Gilles	0–2	SDEFA (Réunion)
8.	(Réunion) SC Bellepierre	0–4	AS Marsouins (Réunion)
9.	(Réunion) AETFC Etg St Leu	0–2	AS Excelsior (Réunion)
10.	(Réunion) US Bénédictine	2–0	AFC St-Laurent (Réunion)
11.	(Réunion) ACS Redoute	3–1	ES Entre-Deux (Réunion)
12.	(Réunion) JCV St-Pierre	3–1 (a.e.t.)	US Bell Cannot (Réunion)
13.	(Réunion) SS La Tamponnaise	6–0	ASC Saint-Etienne (Réunion)
14.	(Réunion) ASC Monaco	3–1	AS Poudrière (Réunion)
15.	(Réunion) AS St-Philippe	1–1 (3–4 p)	Tampon FC (Réunion)
16.	(Réunion) US Ste-Anne	0–1	OCSA Léopards (Réunion)
17.	(Réunion) AS Bretagne	0–2	St-Denis FC (Réunion)
18.	(Réunion) FC 17e km	2–1	JS Bras-Creux (Réunion)
19.	(Réunion) Trois-Bassins FC	2–0	AS Grand-Fond (Réunion)
20.	(Réunion) Jean Petit FC SJ	0–2	AJ Petite-Île (Réunion)
21.	(Réunion) SS Jeanne d'Arc	10–0	AS Guillaume (Réunion)
22.	(Réunion) FC Avirons	4–1	AES Convenance (Réunion)
23.	(Réunion) CO St-Pierre	0–1 (a.e.t.)	ES Etang-Salé (Réunion)
24.	(Réunion) AS Red Star	0–2	AS MJC Ste-Suzanne (Réunion)
25.	(Réunion) AJS Ouest	7–1	AJ Ligne-Bambous (Réunion)
26.	(Réunion) AFC Halte-La	5–0	AS Eperon (Réunion)
27.	(Réunion) ASC Gde-Fontaine	1–4	FC Ligne Paradis (Réunion)
28.	(Réunion) ARC Bras-Fusil	3–4	Cilaos FC (Réunion)
29.	(Réunion) AF St-Louis	4–0	ASE Gde-Montée (Réunion)
30.	(Réunion) JS Saint-Pierroise	8–0	FC Panonnais (Réunion)
31.	(Réunion) US Sainte-Marienne	15–2	AE FC Ouest (Réunion)

=== Alsace ===
These matches were played 22 to 26 August 2015.

Second round results: Alsace

Tie no	Home team (tier)	Score	Away team (tier)
1.	US Niederbronn-les-Bains	3-4	AS Ohlungen
2.	FC Habsheim	0-2 (a.e.t.)	AS Mertzen
3.	Mouloudia C De Mulhouse	2-3 (a.e.t.)	FC Illfurth
4.	AS. Betschdorf	2-0	US Preuschdorf
5.	FC Bindernheim	0-3	RC 1922 Kintzheim
6.	AS Bischoffsheim	1-0	US Oberschaeffolsheim
7.	FC Bischwiller	0-3	FC Eschbach
8.	ASC Blaesheim	0-7	FC Truchtersheim
9.	F.C Dahlenheim	4-1	FC Quatzenheim
10.	FC Dossenheim s/zinsel	2-4	FA Val de Moder
11.	ASL Duntzenheim	6-0	US Section F. Bouxwiller
12.	FC Durrenbach	1-0	FC 1920 Schweighouse S/Moder
13.	FC Entzheim	4-0	AS Sermersheim
14.	FC Ernolsheim les Saverne	3-1	FC Dauendorf
15.	FC Eschau	2-0	AS Neudorf 1925
16.	Cerc S Fegersheim	4-3 (a.e.t.)	FC Ostwald
17.	AS Gambsheim	3-1	AS Schoenenbourg
18.	FC Geudertheim	1-0	AS Platania Gundershoffe
19.	AS Hatten	2-5	AS Hunspach
20.	FC Hessenheim	0-4	C.S Sainte Croix aux Mines
21.	FC Hoffen	2-4	FC Drusenheim
22.	US Imbsheim	0-4	AS Hochfelden
23.	FC Keskastel	1-3 (a.e.t.)	AS Ingwiller
24.	FC Krautergersheim	2-1	FC Boersch
25.	FC Lampertheim	0-4	AS Bergbieten
26.	AS de Laubach	6-3 (a.e.t.)	AS Uhrwiller
27.	OC Lipsheim	2-0	AS Marckolsheim
28.	FC Matzenheim	1-0	US Baldenheim
29.	AS Mertzwiller	0-4	US Gumbrechtshoffen
30.	AS Mundolsheim	2-3	FC Obermodern
31.	US Ittenheim	8-2	FC Niederhausbergen
32.	FC Niederschaeffolsheim	3-2	FC Riedseltz
33.	FC Oberhausbergen	1-5	FC Still 1930
34.	FC Oberhoffen	0-4	FC Soultz ss/Forets
35.	FC Oermingen	0-4	FC Marmoutier
36.	ASC Portugais Val De La Bruche	2-1	AS Mutzig
37.	FC Rhinau	0-3	AS Mussig
38.	SC Roeschwoog	1-4	AS Kilstett
39.	FC Rohrwiller	2-8	SC Roppenheim
40.	S Reunis Rountzenheim Auenheim	0-2	AS Lauterbourg
41.	FC Sand	0-2	AS Hohwarth St Pierre Bois
42.	ASB Schirmeck La Broque	3-0	US Innenheim
43.	US Schleithal	3-2	La Wantzenau FC
44.	AS Seebach	4-3	FC 1935 Soufflenheim
45.	ES Stotzheim	0-2	Rossfeld
46.	A Pop Joie et Sante Strasbourg	0-4	S Reunis Hoenheim
47.	CS Neuhof Strasbourg	1-3	CS Mars Bischheim
48.	FC Stockfeld Colombes	2-4	AS Strasbourg
49.	Strasbourg SUC	1-7	AS Menora Strasbourg
50.	CS Waldhambach	3-0	FC Weislingen
51.	AS Westhouse	4-3	FC Krafft

Tie no	Home team (tier)	Score	Away team (tier)
52.	Et. S Romanswiller	1-1 (6-5 p)	AS Willgottheim
53.	AS Wingen s/Moder	2-0	CS Interc Ent Harskirchen
54.	FC 1920 Wissembourg	0-2	US Turcs Bischwiller
55.	FC Wittisheim	2-0	AS Gerstheim
56.	Olympique Zinswiller	1-2	FC Dambach Neunhoffen
57.	AS Wahlenheim-Bernolsheim	3-2 (a.e.t.)	AS Weyer
58.	AS Aspach-le-Haut	3-0	FC 1926 Pfastatt
59.	FC Baldersheim	3-2 (a.e.t.)	US Thann
60.	AS Burnhaupt-le-Bas	2-0	US Hesingue
61.	AS Canton Vert	1-4	FC Bennwihr
62.	FC Franco Portugais Cernay	1-3	Real Mulhouse FC
63.	FC Gundolsheim	1-2	SC Cernay
64.	AS Mahorais de Colmar	1-1 (8-7 p)	US Gunsbach - Zimmerbach
65.	FCAM Portugais Colmar	1-13	AGIR Florival
66.	RC Dannemarie	0-5	AS Huninque 1919
67.	FC Feldkirch	3-0	FC Red Star Richwiller
68.	FC Folgensbourg	1-2	US Hirsingue
69.	FC Horbourg-Wihr	6-1	AS Andolsheim
70.	AS Lutterbach	3-0	CS Mulhouse Bourtzwiller F
71.	FC Merxheim	2-0	FC Willer sur Thur
72.	FC Montreux-Sports	3-2	Ste S Zillisheim
73.	FC Oberhergheim	2-6	FC Niederhergeim
74.	FC Oltingue	0-1	AS Hochstatt
75.	Ostheim	3-2	AS Pfaffenheim
76.	FC Réguisheim	1-5	FC Fessenheim
77.	Ribeauville	1-0	FC Munchhouse
78.	FC Rosenau	5-1	US Pfetterhouse
79.	FC Rouffach	1-1 (2-4 p)	FC Grussenheim
80.	ALSC Rumersheim	1-4	FC Roderen
81.	AS Sigolsheim	2-4	FC Hirtzfelden
82.	AS Bourgfelden Saint-Louis	2-2 (0-3 p)	FC Ballersdorf
83.	FC Steinbrunn Le Bas	0-2	FC Uffheim
84.	ASB Vieux Thann	4-1	US Oberbruck-Dolleren
85.	Village Neuf	4-3 (a.e.t.)	FC Kappelen
86.	FC Walheim	1-7	AS Blotzheim
87.	S Reunis Dorlisheim	5-1	Cercle S Bernardswiller
88.	FC Haslach	2-1	US Hangenbieten
89.	US Hindisheim	1-4	SC Ebersheim
90.	S Reunis Furdenheim	1-5	FC Eckbolsheim
91.	Etoile Bleue Achenheim	2-1	FC Breuschwickersheim
92.	FC Phalsbourg	0-1	FC Drulingen
93.	FC Ecrivains Schiltigheim-Bisch	2-3	AS Elsau Portugais Strasbourg
94.	AS Portugais Strasbourg	1-2	Olympique Strasbourg
95.	FC Marlenheim Kirchheim	0-7	Ste S Weyersheim
96.	AS Altkirch	3-5	FC Hagenthal 1959
97.	Colmar Unifié FC	0-7	Racing HW 96
98.	FC Ingersheim	3-1	AS Raedersheim
99.	S Reunis Kaysersberg	6-3	FC Meyenheim
100.	ASPTT Mulhouse	0-13	FC Burnhaupt Le Haut
101.	SC Ottmarsheim	1-5	FC Kembs Réunis
102.	FC Riedisheim	0-1	US Wittenheim

=== Aquitaine ===
These matches were played between 5 and 13 September 2015.

Second round results: Aquitaine

Tie no	Home team (tier)	Score	Away team (tier)
1.	SA Mauleonais	1-2	Elan Bearnais d'Orthez
2.	FC Nerac	2-3 (a.e.t.)	Elan Boucalais
3.	JS Rionnaise F	2-1	ET S Montoise
4.	FC Oloronais	3-1	Bleuets de Notre Dame de Pau
5.	FC Gantois	0-1	La Jeanne d'Arc de Bearn Pau
6.	Av Mourenxois	3-1 (a.e.t.)	SA St Severin
7.	SC Taron Sevignacq	1-5	St Paul Sport
8.	FC Hagetmautien	0-2	Les Gars d'Albret de Labrit
9.	FC Espagnol de Pau	3-0	SC Arthez Lacq Audejos
10.	U Portugais de Pau	1-2	Hiriburuko Ainhara St Pierre Irube
11.	Arin Luzien	1-1 (4-3 p)	FC Lescarien
12.	A St Laurent Billere	0-2	FC Tartas Saint Yaguen
13.	Labenne OSC	3-2 (a.e.t.)	AS Pontoise
14.	FA Morlaas est Bearn	3-1	FC Doazit
15.	Entente Haut Bearn	1-0	FC Lons
16.	FC Valle de l'Ousse	1-6	Les Croises de St Andre Bayonne
17.	Racing Club de Dax	1-5	Biscarrosse O
18.	SC St Symphorien	2-4	AS Mazeres Uzos Rontignon
19.	Seignosse Capbreton Soustons FC	5-2	FA Bourbaki Pau
20.	AS Artix	2-3 (a.e.t.)	FC du Luy de Bearn
21.	Fraternelle Landiras	0-5	US St Michel Arudy
22.	US Castetis Gouze	2-1	La Jeanne d'Arc de Dax
23.	AS Tarnos Dite A Federative	3-0	Hasparren FC
24.	AS Coteaux de Dordogne	0-2	Izon Vayres FC
25.	Avenir F Casseneuil Pailloles Ledat 47	1-1 (1-3 p)	AS Anotonne le Change
26.	FC Pays de Mareuil	4-2 (a.e.t.)	FC de la Vallee du Lot-Villeneuve sur Lot
27.	US Galgonaise	5-2	JS Castellevequois
28.	AS Le Haillan	0-3	FC Thenon Limeyrat Fossemagne
29.	FC Pays Beaumontois	2-1 (a.e.t.)	Entente Boe Bon Encontre
30.	AS Lavergne Miramont	2-5	FC du Grand Saint Emilionnais
31.	FC Terrasson	1-5	SU Agenais
32.	AS Portugais de Sarlat	1-4	SC La Bastidienne
33.	Colayrac FC	4-1	CA Pondaurat
34.	Union St Bruno FC SAB	5-0	La Joyeuse de Savignac
35.	Andernos Sport FC	3-2 (a.e.t.)	AS Facture Biganos
36.	AS Villandraut Prechac	4-0	FC St Laurent d'Arce/St Gervais
37.	Stade St Medardais	1-1 (4-3 p)	FC Des Graves
38.	Entente S Mazeres Roaillan	0-2	FC Pessac Alouette
39.	ES d'Audenge	2-2 (2-2 p)	CA Beglais
40.	SC de Cadaujac	1-4	FC Gironde La Reole
41.	Bordeaux AC	1-8	Entente S Bruges
42.	FC Loubesien	0-5	Landes Girondines FC
43.	Amicale S Taillannaise	0-1	CS Lantonnais
44.	Les Bleuets Macariens	2-3	St Pessacais UC
45.	US Alliance Talencaise	3-3 (4-1 p)	FC Martignans Illac
46.	AS Nontron Saint Pardoux	0-1 (a.e.t.)	Amicale S Gensac Montcaret
47.	Confluent Football 47	4-0	AS Villacoise
48.	AS Montferrandaise	1-8	FC des Portes de l'Entre Deux Mers
49.	AS Marcellus Cocumont	2-2 (0-1 p)	FC Estuaire Haute Gironde
50.	US Tocane St Apre	2-0	US Virazeil Puymiclan
51.	Tonneins FC	0-1 (a.e.t.)	ASSA Pays du Dropt
52.	CA Brantomois	0-1	Prigonrieux FC
53.	La Joyeuse St Sulpice et Cameyra	3-0	Les Aiglons Razacois
54.	AS Segonzac Saint Aquilin	1-6	US St Denis de Pile
55.	US Mussidan St Medard	3-1	AS Rouffignac Plazac
56.	FC Communes du Creonnais	2-2 (2-3 p)	CO Coulonieix Chamiers
57.	US de la Pointe du Medoc Football	1-2	FC Medoc Ocean
58.	RC de Bordeaux Metropole	2-1	Sp Portugais Villenave d'Ornon
59.	US Illadaise de Football	1-2	US Bouscataise
60.	SC Aresien	0-7	Les Coqs Rouges Bordeaux
61.	AS St Aubin de Medoc	3-2 (a.e.t.)	US Farguaise
62.	AS Beautiranaise de Football	1-3	US Cenon Rive Droite
63.	AS St Seurinoise	1-2	FC Arsan Lepian Medoc
64.	US Nord Gironde	1-3	CA Ste Helene
65.	Entente S Ambaresienne	2-3	Amicale Laique et Bourg Sports
66.	Stade Pauillacais FC	0-2 (a.e.t.)	Etoile S Canejan
67.	Bordeaux Etudiants C	0-2	Etoile S Eysinaise
68.	Entente S Blanquefortaise	4-1	Club Municipal Floirac
69.	FA Pays Foyen	1-2	Etoile S Boulazac

=== Atlantique ===
These matches were played 29 and 30 August 2015.

Second round results: Atlantique

Tie no	Home team (tier)	Score	Away team (tier)
1.	Oudon Couffe FC	1-1 (3-4 p)	Foyer Esperance de Trelaze
2.	Union St Leger des Bois St Germain des Pres Champtoce sur Loire Avenir	2-1	Club du Haut Layon
3.	US Briolletaine Briollay	2-1	US Soudan
4.	FC Bouaye	1-0	Sympho Foot Treillieres
5.	Pornic Foot	4-0	Nantes Saint Joseph Porterie
6.	St Laurent du Mottay FC Mesnilaurentais	1-2	US Loire et Divatte
7.	Entente S du Layon	4-1	AS Reveil Vernantes
8.	FC Talmondais	1-2 (a.e.t.)	Entente S Cote de Lumiere La Tranche Angles'
9.	ASPTT Nantes	0-1	Elan de Gorges
10.	US Bernardiere Cugand	0-2	Les Marsouins Bretignollais F
11.	St Georges FC	1-4	Etoile S Ornaysienne F Vendee La Roche Sur Yon
12.	ASPTT - CAEB Cholet	2-0	SC Angevin
13.	AS St Gervais	0-1	Etoile S La Copechagniere
14.	AS St Memsin	0-1	Mormaison US Sulpice Andre Mormaison
15.	Entente Sud Vendee	1-1 (4-3 p)	L'Ile d'Elle Canton Chaille Pictons
16.	US Michelaise Triolaise	4-6 (a.e.t.)	Mouilleron Le Captif Sp
17.	FC de Toutes Aides Nantes	1-3	ASR Machecoul
18.	Reveil S Ardelay	1-2	La Saint Pierre de Nantes
19.	Amicale Dolaysienne	0-0 (10-9 p)	Espe de Campbon
20.	FC de l'Immaculee St Nazaire	0-3	AS Avant Garde Haye-Fouassiere
21.	Donges FC	0-1	Nort AC
22.	US Landeronde St Georges	1-2	Geneston AS Sud Loire
23.	US Herminoise	1-2	La Chaize FEC
24.	Entente S La Romagne Roussay	1-0	Cheffois - St Maurice le Grand Etoile Fraternelle
25.	AS Longeron Torfou	1-2 (a.e.t.)	AS St Hilaire Vihiers St Paul
26.	Fay-Bouvron FC	3-1	Amicale Laique Couets Bouguenais
27.	Reveil S des Clouzeaux	1-2	Amicale S La Chataigneraie
28.	Toutlemonde Maulevrier US	1-1 (4-5 p)	US Ste Luce Sur Loir
29.	AS St Sylvain d'Angou	0-5	RC Ancenis 44
30.	FC Ste Cecile St Martin Des Noyers	2-1 (a.e.t.)	St Pierre S Nieul le Dolent
31.	FC Loulaysien	2-3	JSC Bellevue Nantes
32.	US Beaufort en Vallee	3-0	Croix Blanche Angers Football
33.	FC Stephanois	1-3	La St Andre
34.	Beaulieu Sport Football	0-2	US Bequots Lucquois
35.	St Philbert du Pont Charrault Reorthe Jaudonniere FC	2-0	La France d'Aizenay
36.	SC Notre Dame des Champs Angers	3-0	FC du Val de Moine St Germain Sur Moine
37.	SS Antigny St Maurice des Noues	2-1	US Mouilleronnaise
38.	Fuilet Chaussaire FC	3-3 (4-3 p)	AS Ponts de Ce
39.	US Varadaise	1-3	FC Belligne St Sauveur
40.	Entente S Les Pineaux	0-6	Mareuil SC
41.	FC Brainnois Boissen	1-2	St Pierre de Retz - St Pere Retz
42.	US Maze	2-2 (4-3 p)	Chemille Melay Olympique
43.	US Getigne	0-7	Pouzauges Reamur AC
44.	Chatelais FC	0-0 (4-3 p)	AS Independante de Murs-Erigne
45.	Etoile du Bocage Boissiere Montaigu	2-5	FC Generaudiere Roche Sud
46.	FC La Montagne	1-2 (a.e.t.)	Union Fraternelle St Herblain
47.	St Pierre de Maziere en Mauges	2-3	AS Bayard Saumur St Hilaire St Florent
48.	Petit Mars FC	1-9	AS Sautronnaise
49.	AS de Mesanger	2-3 (a.e.t.)	US St Aubin des Chateaux
50.	Entente S Maritime Piriac Turballe	3-0	FC Estuaire Paimboeuf

Tie no	Home team (tier)	Score	Away team (tier)
51.	FC des Portugais de Cholet	4-0	Nantes Sud 98
52.	Entente S de Blain	1-2 (a.e.t.)	St Aubin Guerande
53.	Loups S Grasla Les Brouzils	2-3	Avenir S Saint Pierre Montrevault
54.	ASVR Ambillou Chateau	0-2	AS Tierce Cheffes
55.	FC Sud Vilaine	2-3	FC des Trois Rivieres
56.	St Marc F	2-1	Groupemont S de St Sebastien Sur Loire
57.	FC Le Pin Vritz	1-9	Amicale Laique Chateaubriant
58.	FC Salignais de Saligny	1-2	Flocelliere Chamon Sevre
59.	US Pont St Martin	0-2	ES Vertou Foot
60.	L'Hermenault FC Plaine et Bocage	5-1	US Aubigny
61.	US de Marans	0-1	US Thouareenne
62.	Reveil St Gereon	1-3	'Etoile de Clisson
63.	AS de Maine Aigrefeuille Remouille	1-3 (a.e.t.)	FC Essartais
64.	AC Basse Goulains	1-1 (5-4 p)	US St Philbert de Grandlieu
65.	US Marais Beauvoir Sur Mer	0-2	FC Robretieres La Roche Sur Yon
66.	Amicale S Landevielle	0-2	La Vigilante de St Fulgent
67.	Orvault RC	3-1	Verrie Saint-Aubin VDS
68.	Jeanne-Arc St Mars du Desert	2-3	FC Beaupreau
69.	Amicale Beignon Basset Poire Sur Vie	1-2	Etoile S Grosbreuil
70.	US Autize Vendee	0-2	La Fraternelle Mortagne Sur Sevre
71.	Entente S Denee Loire et Louet	0-5	AS Seiches Sur Le Loir Marce
72.	Avenir Regriperois Crepinois Tilliers	2-0	Arche FC
73.	Bauge En Avant Baugeois	0-3	Vaillante S Angers
74.	C Om St Mars La Jaille S	1-4 (a.e.t.)	Montreuil Juigne Bene F
75.	En Avant La Tessoualle	0-3	La Mellinet de Nantes
76.	Epse de Crossac	1-2	US La Baule - Le Pouliguen
77.	Entente S L'Aubance Brissac Quince	6-6 (4-3 p)	Jeanne d'Arc de Villemoisan
78.	Etoil S St Dennis La Chevasse	6-1	Avenir S Le Puy St Bonnet
79.	Reveil St Aubinois	0-3	Sud Vendee Football Benet Damvix Maille
80.	Entente S D'Andard Brain	3-4	Esp S de Bouchemaine
81.	St Herblaine OC	0-0 (4-5 p)	Avenir S de Bouffere
82.	Amicale S Landaise	1-4	ASC St Medard de Doulon Nantes
83.	Etoile du Don Moisdon Meilleraye	0-1	AS Grandchamp Des Fontaines
84.	Commequiers Sp	0-4	AC St Brevin
85.	US Combre Bel-Air Noyant	1-2	US Autonome Pouance
86.	Entente S Les Rosiers Sur Loire	2-4 (a.e.t.)	Les Aiglons Durtalois de Durtal
87.	FC Becon St Augustin	0-1	Intrepide Angers F
88.	St Gilles St Hilaire FC	0-3	Stade Olonne Sur Mer
89.	AS La Madeleine	1-2	Entente S de Pornichet
90.	FC Chabossiere	2-3	La Malouine St Malo de Guersac
91.	Esp St Yves de Nantes	0-6	Amicale Ecoles Pont Rousseau Reze
92.	AS Sion Lusanger	2-0	Amis S Guillaumoise Pontchateau
93.	L'Hirondelle St Julien de Concelles	0-0 (2-3 p)	Andreze La Jubaudiere Jallais FC
94.	FC Castel Fiacrais	0-3	FC Montaigu
95.	Hermitage de Venansault	0-7	Les Ecureuils des Pays de Monts
96.	St Cyr Herbignac	6-0	Oceane FC
97.	Entente S La Poueze	2-2 (2-3 p)	FC Pellouailles Corze
98.	US Bournezeau St Hilaire	1-3	FC Des Achards
99.	FC Du Layon	0-1	Christopheseguiniere
100.	Etoile S Du Lac St Lumine de Coutais	2-1	Jeune Garde de l'Edre Suce

=== Auvergne ===
These matches were played 29 and 30 August, and 6 September 2015.

Second round results: Auvergne

Tie no	Home team (tier)	Score	Away team (tier)
1.	FC Riomois	1-1 (3-4 p)	US Beaumontoise
2.	FC de Benezet	1-1 (5-3 p)	Etoile Moulins Yzeure
3.	US Pop Commentryenne	2-3 (a.e.t.)	US de Doyet
4.	US Cere et Landes	2-0	Carladez Goul S
5.	Retournac Sp	5-1	Montregard Jeunes et Loisirs Raucoules
6.	US St Gervaisienne	3-1	AS St Jacques
7.	FC Nord Combraille	1-3	Cebazet Sp
8.	FC Aurec	3-1	FC Dunieres
9.	Montagne Bourbonnaise FC	1-2	AS Chassenard Luneau
10.	AS Nord Vignoble	4-1	Bourbon Sp
11.	CS de Vaux Estivareilles	0-9	FC Souvignyssois
12.	Amicale S St Angel	1-2	US St Victor
13.	US Lignerolles Lavault St Anne	3-1	Esp Molinetois
14.	AS des Cheminots St Germanois	1-3	SC Avermois
15.	Ballon Beaulonnais	2-1	FC la Chapelle Molles
16.	AS Montmaraultoise F	1-6	A Amicale Lapalissoise
17.	AS de Billezois	2-3	AS de Tronget
18.	SC Amicale Cussetois	4-1 (a.e.t.)	FC Billy-Crechy
19.	US Trezelloise	1-3	AS Dompierroise
20.	Vigilante Garnat St Martin	0-3	SC St Pourcinois
21.	ASPTT Moulins	0-10	Stade St Yorrais
22.	CS de Bessay	2-1	ES de Diou
23.	AS Mercy-Chapeau	3-1	AS Neuillyssoise
24.	AS St Prix	0-1	SC Gannatois
25.	AS Naucelles	0-1 (a.e.t.)	US Crandelloise
26.	FC de l'Artense	1-3	US Vallee de l'Authre
27.	AS Espinat F	1-4	Amicale S Sansacoise
28.	US Siranaise	2-3	Entente Stade Riomis-Condat
29.	Cercle S Vezacois	0-4	FC Ally Muriac
30.	FC Mussageois	0-2	Cercle S Arpajonnais
31.	AS Doire-Bertrande	0-3	US Murataise
32.	ES Pierrefortaise	2-2 (7-8 p)	Sp Chataigneraie Cantal
33.	US du Haut Cele	0-3	Sud Cantal Foot
34.	US Blazovy	4-2	SC Langogne
35.	FC de Tenze	0-6	US Arsac en Envy
36.	St Paulien Blanzac FC	0-1	FC Espaly
37.	US Briuode	2-2 (2-3 p)	A Vergongheon Arvant
38.	Seauve Sp	1-4	US Monistrol Sur Loire
39.	US Bassoise	2-3	AS Cheminots Langeac
40.	US Lantriac	0-10	AS Chadrac
41.	US Vic Le Comte	2-0	Amicale Laique S de Besse Egliseneuve
42.	US Chapdes Beaufort	1-5	JS St Priest des Champs
43.	US Mozac	1-2	Esp Ceyratoise
44.	Perignat FC	0-2	Lempdes Sp
45.	FC Olby-Ceyssat-Mazayes	0-3	AS Romagnat
46.	Aulnat Sp	2-1	FC Nord Limagne
47.	AS Cunlhatoise	0-12	La Combelle Charbonnier A Breui
48.	CS St Bonnet Pres Riom	2-1	Ambert FCUS Ambertoise
49.	US St Beauzire	5-0	FC Chatel Guyon
50.	FC Plauzat-Champeix	0-1	US Courpieroise
51.	A des Guineens de la Region Auvergne FC	1-1 (4-2 p)	Durolle Foot
52.	AS de Malintrat	1-3	AS Enval - Marsat
53.	US Maringuoise	3-1	CS Pont du Chateau
54.	Entente FC St Amant et Tallende	1-0 (a.e.t.)	US Les Martres de Veyre
55.	CS St Anthemoise	0-8	FC Lezoux
56.	Domes Sancy Foot	2-1	Clermont Outre Mer
57.	US La Garde - Loubaresse	0-1	US Aspre Maronne
58.	US Vendatoise	1-0	Amicale S Trevoloise
59.	US Ennezat	0-0 (4-3 p)	FC Blanzat
60.	ES St Germinoise	1-3	AS Emblavez - Vorey
61.	Etoile S St Mamet	0-3	FC Massiac-Molompize-Blesle

=== Brittany ===
Second round results: Brittany (incomplete)

Tie no	Home team (tier)	Score	Away team (tier)
1.	St-Méen-St-Onen	1-4	Espérance Chartres-de-Bretagne
2.	FC Bruz	1-0	USC Chavagne
3.	St-Thuriau Ggs	0-3	FC Baud
4.	Landi FC	2-1	Ju Plougonven
5.	Gars de Plouénan	2-0	ES Lampaulaise
6.	AS Broons	1-4	JA Balazé

=== Lower Normandy ===
These matches were played on 29 and 30 August 2015, and 2 September 2015.

Second round results: Lower Normandy

Tie no	Home team (tier)	Score	Away team (tier)
1.	Etoile S Pointe de la Hague	2-1	AS Tourlaville
2.	Etoile S Thury Harcourt	1-1 (5-4 p)	Entente S FC Falaise
3.	CS Villedieu	2-1	Esp St Jean De La Haize
4.	US Cote des Iles	0-4	FC Equeurdreville Hainneville
5.	UC Bricquebetaise F	2-0	AS Brix
6.	ES Quettetot Rauville	0-3	AS Querquevillaise F
7.	Creances S	0-6	CS Carentanais
8.	AC Sideville - Virandeville - Teurtheville-Hague	0-6	AS de Cherbourg F
9.	AS Pointe Cotentin	1-0	ES Plain
10.	US Ouest Cotentin	4-1	US La Glacerie
11.	US des Mouettes Donville	1-3	Esp St Jean Champs
12.	Etoile S Gouville Sur Mer	1-6	US Roncey Cerisy
13.	St Hilaire Virey Landelles	1-2	US St Pairaise
14.	Etoile S du Terregate et du Beuvron	1-11	US Ducey
15.	US St Martin des Champs	1-4	FC Agon Coutainville
16.	AS Jullouville Sartilly	1-3	AS Brecey
17.	FC Sienne	0-3	Entente S Coutancaise
18.	Etoile S Marigny Lozon Mesnil Vigot	2-0	ES Portaise
19.	Ev S du Tronquay	1-2 (a.e.t.)	US Semilly St Andre
20.	US Maisons	0-0 (2-3 p)	Entente Cantonale Tessy Moyon Sports
21.	FC des Etangs	3-0	CA Pontois
22.	US Ste Croix de St Lo	6-1	FC 3 Rivieres
23.	Amicale S Verson	1-1 (1-3 p)	Agneaux FC
24.	Amicale S Cahagnaise	1-11	Bayeux FC
25.	Entente S Hebecrevon	2-4	AS St Vigor Le Grand
26.	US Villiers Bocage	1-0 (a.e.t.)	US Intercommuncale Bessin Nord
27.	AS La Selle La Forge	0-3	FC Flerien
28.	Amicale FC St Dennis De Mere	1-5	CO Ceauce
29.	JS de Tinchebray	0-7	US D'Andaine
30.	US Intercommunale La Graverie	0-6	A Les Leopards de St Georges
31.	Etoile S Isigny Le Buat	3-2 (a.e.t.)	USC Ominsports de Sourdeval
32.	Amicale Mines La Ferriere Aux Etangs	0-3	AF Virois
33.	Stade S St Georges Domfront	1-6	AS Potigny-Villers Canivet-Ussy
34.	AS Sarceaux Espoir	2-3	AS Berd Huis Football
35.	Etoile S Livartoise	1-0 (a.e.t.)	Amicale S Gaceene
36.	AS Bouce	0-2	FC du Pays Aiglon
37.	FC St Germain De La Coudre	1-3	US Mortagnaise
38.	AS Villeneuve Alençon	0-2	Entente S Pays Ouche
39.	A Chailloue	1-13	US Alenconnaise 61
40.	AS Avenir St Germain Du Corbeis	2-1	Vimoutiers FC
41.	Esp Conde Sur Sarthe	1-9	FC Argentan
42.	Avante Garde Caennaise	0-4	SU Divaise
43.	Entente S Val de l'Orne	0-5	Cambes En Plaine Sp
44.	FC Langrune Luc	0-6	SC Herouvillais
45.	US Gueriniere	1-2	Bourgebus Soliers FC
46.	FC Louvigny	0-7	Maladrerie OS
47.	CS Honfleur	2-0	FC Argences
48.	AS Moult Bellengreville	0-5	Elan S Carpiquet
49.	CS Beuvillers	0-5	AS Ifs
50.	USC Mezidon Football	3-0	US Municipale Blainsvillaise
51.	Hermanville Lion Sur Mer FC	0-2	US Houlgate
52.	JS Collevillaise	0-4	LC Bretteville Sur Odon
53.	Entente S Cormelles Football	1-5	A des Jeunesses S Ouistreham
54.	JS Douvres La Delivrande	1-2	US Ouvriere Normande Mondeville
55.	FC Lisieux Pays d'Auge	2-6	Reveil St Germain Courselles Sur Mer
56.	US Thaon - Le Fresne - Vallee de la Mue	2-3	AS Trouville Deauville
57.	CA Lisieux F Pays d'Auge	2-0	Dozule FC

=== Bourgogne ===
These matches were played on 30 August and 6 September 2015.

 Second round results: Bourgogne

Tie no	Home team (tier)	Score	Away team (tier)
1.	FC de Champs	3-0	AS Veron
2.	US Joigny	3-1	US de Cerisiers
3.	Cosnois FC	2-1	FC de Monteau
4.	Etoile S Donziase	1-6	US Semur En Auxois Epoisses
5.	US de Varennes	1-0	US Cosnois S
6.	ES Appoigny	1-0	FC de Fleury La Vallee
7.	St Fargeau SF	3-5	Montbard Venarey F
8.	Amicale SU Cheminote de Migennes	1-2	AS Clamecycoise
9.	AFC Champigny Sur Yonne	1-5	FC du Gatinais en Bourgogne
10.	AS Magny	4-1	US Toucycoise
11.	FC de St Remy les Montbard	0-6	Stade Auxerrois
12.	US Luzy Millay	2-1	Dornes Neuville O
13.	AS Perrecycoise	1-3 (a.e.t.)	US de Coulanges Les Nevers
14.	AS St Vincent Bragny	4-1	F Benfica d'Autun
15.	ASC Pouguoise	2-1 (a.e.t.)	CS Sanvignes Les Mines
16.	ES Toulonnaise	1-4	AS Garchizy
17.	Foyeur Rural d'Education Populaire Luthenay	0-1	RC Nevers-Challuy Sermoise
18.	US Bourbon Lancy FPT F	2-4	Digoin FCA
19.	ASA Vauzelles	1-3	US Charitoise
20.	US Genelard-Martigny	0-3	AS de Sornay
21.	Sance FC	1-7	AS La Chapelle De Guinchay
22.	SC Chateaurenaud	4-0	Dun Sornin F
23.	FC de La Roche Vineuse	3-0 w/o	AS Ciry Le Noble
24.	US St Martin Senozan	5-3	Jeunes Footballeurs Palingeois
25.	FC D'Hurigny	1-3 (a.e.t.)	US Cluny F
26.	Entente S du Pays Charollais	0-5	US Blanzynoise F
27.	Entente S St Germain du Plain Baudrie	0-1	FC Abergement De Cuisery
28.	AS St Albain	0-3	JS Maconnaise
29.	FC Corgoloin Ladoix	2-1	Sassenay Virey Lessard Fragnes
30.	AS Lacanche	1-3	J Ouvriere du Creusot
31.	CS de Mervans	0-2	CS Auxonnais
32.	AS St Leger Sur Dheune	2-3 (a.e.t.)	A Chalonnaise F
33.	US St Serninoise	0-0 (3-2 p)	JS Montchanin Odra
34.	Amicale S Loisirs de Lux	0-2	US de Meursault
35.	FC Epervans	0-2	FC Saulon Corcelles
36.	FC Chassagne Montrachet	1-0	AS de Varennes Le Grand
37.	FC St Remy	2-1 (a.e.t.)	JS Abergement Ste Colombe
38.	AS Chatenoy Le Royal	3-1	JS Rully
39.	Entente Fauverney Rouvres Bretenier	3-1	ASPTT Dijon
40.	US Marey Cussey	1-4	Chevigny St Sauveur F
41.	A Loisirs Culture Longvic	1-0	US Cheminots Dijonnais
42.	Cerc S Laique Chenove	2-0	FC Mirebellois Pontailler Lamarche
43.	AS St Apollinaire	5-2	A Gresilles FC Dijon
44.	Reveil Is Sur Tille	2-0	AS de Pouilly En Auxois
45.	FC Remilly	1-2	ASC de Plombieres
46.	Entente F Villages	0-2	Fontaine Les Dijon FC
47.	AS Cessey Sur Tille	0-3	AS Genlis
48.	AS Tournusienne	0-4	US de St Bonnet La Guiche

=== Centre-Val de Loire ===
These matches were played on 29 and 30 August, and 6 September 2015.

Second round results: Centre-Val de Loire

Tie no	Home team (tier)	Score	Away team (tier)
1.	AS St Germain Du Puy	0-4	FC St Jean Le Blanc
2.	FC St Peravy Ormes	0-5	US Chateauneuf Sur Loire
3.	Societe Municipale OC St Jean De Braye	1-2	US Balgentienne Val de Loire Beaugency
4.	OC Chateaudun	3-1	Dammarie Foot Bois Gueslin
5.	Cercle Jules Ferry Fleury Les Aubrais	0-3	FC St Georges Sur Eure
6.	FC de Boigny Sur Bionne	2-5 (a.e.t.)	US Municipale Saran
7.	Entente Nancray Chambon Nibelle	3-4 (a.e.t.)	CA Pithiviers
8.	Entente S Gatinaise Ferrieres	4-2	Chartres Horizon F
9.	CO de Cherisy	0-2	CS Mainvilliers F
10.	Entente S Marigny Les Usages	1-0	US Beaue La Rolande
11.	U Portugaise Sociale S Orleans	0-5	US Municipale Montargis F
12.	FC Municipal Ingre	2-1	Amicale Épernon
13.	Etoile S Jouy St Prest	0-1	Avenir S Chateauneuf En Thymerais
14.	US Ousson Sur Loire	2-5	US Municipale Olivet
15.	Gazelec S Bourges	1-5	CS Municipal Sully Sur Loire
16.	RC Bouzy Les Bordes	2-1 (a.e.t.)	Diables Rouges Selles St Denis
17.	US Sancerre	0-4	Vierzon FC
18.	US Poilly Lez Gien	1-3	Societe S La Solognote Souesmes
19.	US Dampierre En Burly	1-5	J3 S Amilly
20.	FC St Doulchard	2-0	Amicale S St Gaultier Thenay
21.	Entente S Trouy	3-1	US Argenton Sur Creuse
22.	Entente AS Orval	1-0	AS St Amandoise St Amand Montrond
23.	US Le Poinconnet	4-1	US Montierchaume
24.	US La Chatre	3-2	FC Diors
25.	SA Issoudin	2-1	US Selles Sur Cher
26.	FC Blere Val de Cher	0-4	FC de l'Ouest Tourangeau 37
27.	Entente Grand Champs Touvent Chateauroux	0-5	Vineuil S
28.	C Amicale Montrichard	1-1 (3-4 p)	Amicale des Jeunes du Secteur de Mont et Bracieux
29.	US St Maur	4-1 (a.e.t.)	US St Pierre Des Corps
30.	Joue Les Tours FC Touraine	3-1	US Chambray Les Tours
31.	Alerte S de Fondettes	1-1 (4-3 p)	US Villedieu Sur Indre
32.	St Georges Descartes	6-0	US Le Blanc
33.	SC Azay Le Rideau - Cheille	5-1	Langeais Cinq Mars F
34.	AS de l'Aubriere	1-5	FC Richelieu
35.	FC Levroux	0-12	FC Deolois Deols
36.	Etoile Bleue St Cyr Sur Loire	5-2	Racing La Riche Tours
37.	US Monnaie	0-7	Blois F 41
38.	SC Tours Nord	1-3	ASC des Portugais Blois
39.	Etoile S La Ville Aux Dames	0-2	AFC Blois 1995
40.	AS Chanceaux Sur Choisville	3-0	Avionnette Parcay Meslay FC
41.	Amicale S Nazelles Negron	2-5	US Chittenay Cellettes
42.	US Vendome	2-1	CS Luistanos Beaugency
43.	US de Bitray Chateauroux	0-6	Bourges Foot
44.	CA St Laurent Nouan F	5-3	CS Bonneval
45.	C Deport Espagnol Orleans	4-1	FCO St Jean De La Ruelle
46.	Cercle Laique Bonny Sur Loire	2-4	SC Massay
47.	US St Florent Sur Cher	1-5	US Chateaumeillant
48.	Entente S Veretz Larcay	4-2	AC Villers Les Ormes
49.	J Amicale S Moulins Sur Cephons	2-0	FC du Val de Vienne

=== Centre-West ===
These matches were played on 29 and 30 August 2015.

Second round results: Centre-West

Tie no	Home team (tier)	Score	Away team (tier)
1.	UA Niort St Florent	4-0	FC Perigny
2.	US Melusine Lusignan	2-0	Entente S Bocage
3.	Entente S Gueretoise	2-0	Section A Le Palais Sur Vienne
4.	US Bessines-Morterolles	2-1	Etoile S Aiglons Brive
5.	US Anais	1-0	La Jarrie FC
6.	Etoile S Champniers	0-3 (a.e.t.)	St Palais S
7.	FC du Confolentais	1-0	Avenir de Matha
8.	Amicale J Montmoreau	1-2	CS Bussac Foret
9.	Amicale S St Yrieix	2-3	SC St Jean D'Angely
10.	US Aigrefeuille	2-5	Amicale S Soyaux
11.	FC Sevigne Jonzac St Germain	3-4 (a.e.t.)	US Chasseneuil
12.	US Marennaise	3-1	CS Leroy Angoulême
13.	AS Maritime de Nieul Sur Mer	3-1	RC Parthenay Viennay
14.	Oleron FC	2-4	JS Sireuil
15.	ES Thenacaise	1-2	SC Mouthiers
16.	US Donzenacoise	2-0	JS Lafarge Limoges
17.	Entente S Nonardaise	2-5	CA Rilhac Rancon
18.	Entente S Ussel	0-0 (5-4 p)	U Societes S Merinchal
19.	ES Ardin	3-1	FC Ocean de Bois En Re
20.	Cercle O Cerizay	0-3	La Ligugeenne
21.	US Courlay	1-2 (a.e.t.)	Aunis Avenir FC
22.	Gati-Foot	0-2	A des Anciens de l'Avenir Maritime Laleu La Pallice
23.	La Roche-Rivieres FC Tardoire	2-0	Val de Boutonne Foot 79
24.	ACG Foot Sud 86	1-0	U Fraternelle Barbezieux-Barret
25.	SC Chasseneuil Du Poitou	2-4 (a.e.t.)	Elan S Aubinrothais
26.	US Payroux	2-4	Entente S Chanteloup-Chapelle
27.	FC Rouille	0-5	SA Moncoutant
28.	AS de Valdivienne	1-2 (a.e.t.)	Entente S Beaulieu - Breuil
29.	AS Aixe Sur Vienne	1-0	FC Argentacois
30.	AS Chateauneuf Neuvic	1-3	Tulle F Correze
31.	US Oradour Sur Glane	0-2	AS Jugeals Noailles
32.	US Solignac le Vigen	0-1 (a.e.t.)	Varetz AC
33.	US Brossac	2-1	US Pons
34.	Entente S Elan Charentais	1-3	CS Beauvoir Sur Niort
35.	CO La Couronne	3-1	Amicale Laique FC Fontcouverte
36.	Coqs Rouges Mansle	0-3	Avenir S Aiffres
37.	Amicale S Puymoyen	10-1	FC Aunisien Vouhe
38.	Stade Ruffec	1-3	Entente S Celles-Verrines
39.	U Amicale St Sulpice De Cognac	3-1	Entente S Port Des Barques

Tie no	Home team (tier)	Score	Away team (tier)
40.	JS Suris	2-1	AS du Pays Mellois
41.	AS Villebois Haute Boeme	1-3 (a.e.t.)	Entente S Saintes F
42.	La Rochelle Villeneuve FC	4-2	Entente S Pinbrecieres
43.	JS Semussacaise	7-0	Etoile S Mornac
44.	ES St Just Luzac	1-3	OFC de Ruelle
45.	FC St Rogantien	1-9	US Combranssiere
46.	AS Beynat	2-1	AS Nieul
47.	Societe S Ste Fereole	0-1	SC Verneuil Sur Vienne
48.	FC St Jal	0-2	US Entente Couzeix-Chaptelat
49.	Entente S Evaux Budeliere	1-3	Cercle A Egletons
50.	US Felletin	2-3	CA Meymacois
51.	US de Grand Bourg	2-0	F Cognacois Cyrien Laurentais
52.	FC Pays Argentonnais	1-0	US Vouille
53.	AS Le Beugnon Beceleuf Faye	0-8	Entente S Brion St Secondin
54.	US Brion	0-4	Antran S Loisirs
55.	AS Portugais Cerizay	2-3	Avenir S de la Baie
56.	Societe Education Populaire La Concorde Exireuil	1-7	Cap Aunis ASPTT FC
57.	Entente S Fayenoirterre	0-2	ES Nouaille
58.	SC L'Absie-Largeasse	1-2 (a.e.t.)	FC Fleure
59.	AS Portugais Niort	3-3 (5-4 p)	AS Rethaise
60.	Etoils S St Amand Sur Sevre	0-1	Entente S des Trois Cites Poitiers
61.	Entente S St Cerbouille	4-1	AS Portugais Chatellerauly
62.	AS St Pierre Des Echaubrognes	0-4	CA Neuville
63.	US Vasleenne	4-3	AS Dompierre Bourgneuf FC 17
64.	US Vergentonnaise	1-2	AS Cheminots Poitiers Biard
65.	Entente Voulmentin St Aubin La Coudre	0-7	ES Buxerolles
66.	Entente S Beaumont St Cyr	0-0 (5-3 p)	FC Pays de l'Ouin
67.	AS Civaux	2-4	Entente S Marchoise Noth St Priest la Feuille
68.	Sud Vienne Region de Couhe	4-5	FC Niord 17
69.	US La Ferriere Airoux	0-6	US St Saveur
70.	Elan S Oyre Dange	2-2 (5-4 p)	FC Nueillaubiers
71.	AS Sèvres Anxaumont	0-2	Esperance Terves ES
72.	US Thure Besse	1-2	FC Vrines
73.	US Usson Du Poitou	3-2	Eveil F Le Tallud
74.	Avenir Bellac - Berneuil - St Junien Les Combes	1-4	CA St Savin St Germain
75.	AS Aiguille Bosmie Charroux	2-1	US St Fiel
76.	Mayotte FC de Limoges	2-1	CA Chamboulivois
77.	AS Panazol	4-2	AS St Sulpice Le Gueretois
78.	FC St Brice Sur Vienne	0-4	Avenir S de Gouzon

=== Franche-Comté ===
These matches were played on 29 and 30 August 2015.

Second round results: Franche-Comté

Tie no	Home team (tier)	Score	Away team (tier)
1.	As d'Orchamps Vennes	2-0	Jura Lacs F
2.	CS de Frasne	5-0	ASC de Velotte Besançon
3.	SC Villers Le Lac	2-1	FC de Colombe
4.	FC Grandvillars	6-1	US Chatenois Les Forges
5.	FC de Mouchard Arc et Senans	1-0	A Serre Franois Chemaudin
6.	RC Lons Le Saunier	2-0	Entente Roche Novillars
7.	FC Morteau Montlebon (Note: FC Morteau Montlebon subsequently penalised and removed from competition. Promo S Besancon awarded victory)	1-0	Promo S Besançon
8.	FC de l'Isle Sur Doubs	3-1 (a.e.t.)	US Montbeliardaise
9.	AS Perrousienne	0-4	FC Noidanais
10.	ASC Soma Tsara Mahoraise Besançon	1-2	AS d'Ornans
11.	AS Avoudrey	2-1	US Larians Et Muna
12.	US des Pres de Vaux Besançon	0-5	Triangle d'Or Jura Foot
13.	AS du Chateau de Joux	2-2 (3-1 p)	FC Damparis
14.	FC Aiglepierre	0-1	FC Chatillon Devecey
15.	FC Val de Loue	0-2	US St Vit
16.	US Rioz Etuz Cussey	1-4	SC Clemenceau Besançon
17.	Amicale S Vaux Les St Claude	2-3	Entente Sud Revermount Cousance St Amou
18.	FC Pirey Ecole Valentin	0-5	Bresse Jura Foot
19.	Jura Nord F	1-2	FC Champagnole
20.	FC Cantonal la Joux Nozeroy	0-5	AS Levier
21.	AS Mont d'Usiers	1-6	AS Jura Dolois F
22.	US Avanne	5-0	Promo Sport Dole Crissey
23.	Thise Chalezeule FC	2-1	Poligny Grimont FC
24.	Entente S Pays Maichois	5-3	ASL Autechaux Roide
25.	FC 4 Rivieres 70	1-3	US Pont De Roide Vermondans
26.	FC du Pays Minier	2-3 (a.e.t.)	FC Giro Lepuix
27.	FC Breuches	3-3 (1-4 p)	AS Bavilliers
28.	AS Danjoutin Andelnans Meroux	2-2 (3-5 p)	FC Bart
29.	SC Longevelle	2-4	AS Baume Les Dames
30.	AS Essert	3-6	Etoile S Exincourt Taillecourt
31.	O Courcelles Les Montbeliard	1-6	A des Amities Franco Turques
32.	US de Sochaux	1-0	AS Belfort Sud
33.	SC Courchaton	0-5	FC de Montfaucon-Morre-Gennes
34.	FC des Forges d'Audincourt	4-6 (a.e.t.)	FC Le Russey
35.	Vallee du Breuchin FC	0-5	S Genereaux Hericourt
36.	Etoile S Montenois	0-3	Selencourt
37.	FC Villars Sous Ecot	1-3	RC Voujeaucourt
38.	FC Valdahon Vercel	1-1 (3-1 p)	O Montbeliard FC
39.	US Arcey	2-0	US Scey Sur Saône

=== Languedoc-Roussillon ===
These matches were played between 22 and 30 August 2015.

Second round results: Languedoc-Roussillon

Tie no	Home team (tier)	Score	Away team (tier)
1.	Entente Naurouze SU Labastidienne	0-7	F Agglomeration Carcassonne
2.	FC Chusclan Laudan L'Ardoise	1-4	FC Bagnols Pont
3.	Elne FC	3-2	Perpignan DC Bas Vernet
4.	FC Stephanois	1-1 (5-4 p)	FC Alberes Argeles
5.	Limoux Pieusse FC	1-3	US Conquoise
6.	Aurore St Gilloise	0-7	AS Lattoise
7.	US Monobletoise	1-12	Avenir Foot Lozere
8.	Etoile S Fanjeaux la Piege	0-13	FU Narbonne
9.	FC Thuirnois	1-5	Canet Roussillon FC
10.	FC Cerdagne Font Romeu Capcir	0-9	OC Perpignan
11.	AS St Christol Lez Ales	0-5	SC Anduzien
12.	O Lapeyrade FC	1-3	Gallia C Lunellois
13.	AS St Privat	1-2	Marvejols S
14.	FC Val de Ceze	2-1	CO Soleil Levant Nîmes
15.	USO Florensac Pinet	0-1 (a.e.t.)	O de St Andrew
16.	Entente S Rochefort Signargues	0-4	Gallia C d'Uchaud
17.	RC St Laurent Des Arbres	1-2	JS Chemin Bas d'Avignon
18.	FC Alzonnais	0-2	FC Briolet
19.	Trebes FC	0-0 (5-4 p)	U Footballistique de Lezignanais
20.	AS Puissalicon Magalas	1-6	FC Corbieres Mediterranee
21.	Entente Corneilhan Lignan FC	1-3	La Clermontaise
22.	Societe Omnisport St Papoul	0-3	CO Castelnaudry
23.	Etoile S Eulalie Villesque	1-0	Etoile S Arzenaise
24.	FC de la Vallee du Lauquet	2-4	US du Minervois
25.	AS Bramaise	1-1 (4-5 p)	Haut Minervois Olympique
26.	FC Villeneuvois	2-3	Trapel FC
27.	FC St Nazarois	4-1	FC Chalabrois
28.	US Salhersienne	1-3	FC de Villegly
29.	Cabestany OC	2-1	AS Perpignan
30.	Salanca FC	3-0	FC Solerien
31.	Ille Sur Tet FC	5-0	FC St Feliu D'Avall
32.	AS Prades F	6-5	BECE FC Vallee de l'Agly
33.	FC Villelongue	2-3	FC St Cyprien Latour
34.	Premian FC	1-5	US Béziers
35.	Meze Stade FC	5-0	FC Aspiranais
36.	ASPTT Montpellier	2-0	Arsenal Croix d'Argent FC
37.	Etoile S Nezignanaise	4-3	AS Roujan Caux
38.	FC Vauverdois	1-3	AS St Martin Montpellier
39.	Vaillante Aumonaise	0-4	Entente S des Communes Le Buisson
40.	Stade St Barbe La Grand Combe	6-1	AS St Julien Les Roisers
41.	USA Canauloise	2-6	Avenir S Roussonnais
42.	ASC le Refuge	0-7	AS St Georges De Levejac
43.	US Montagnacoise	4-0	MJC Gruissan
44.	AS Atlas Paillade	4-1	CA Poussan F
45.	SC Manduellois	1-4 (a.e.t.)	Entente Perrier Vergeze
46.	RC Generac	2-5	US Salinieres Aigues Mortes
47.	Red Star O Cournonterral	0-3	Avenir S Frontignan AC
48.	Avenir S Juvignac	0-5	FC Pyramid Grande Motte Littoral
49.	AS Pignan	2-1	Entente St Clement Montferrier
50.	Avenir S Gignacois	1-4	FC Petit Bard Montpellier
51.	AS Canetoise	1-2	Stade Balarucois
52.	US du Trefle	0-6	Centre Educatif Palavas
53.	FC Langlade	0-3	Arceaux Montpellier
54.	Point d'Interrogation Vendarguois	5-3	AS de Caissargues
55.	AS St Paulet	2-1	Nîmes Lasallien
56.	Gazelec S Gardois	0-3	Entente S Marguerittoise
57.	RC Vedasien	4-6	Baillargues St Bres Valergues
58.	ROC Social Sete	4-1	FC St Pargoirien
59.	Castelnau le Cres FC	8-0	FC Pradeen
60.	Reveil Sportif Gigeannais	0-2	Pointe Courte AC Sete
61.	AS Montarnaud St Paul Vaihauques Murviel	7-0	AS les Pierrots de Teyran
62.	US Lunel Vielloise OS	4-2	US de Basses Cevennes
63.	Entente S Rimeize F	2-5	Avenir S du Tarn et du Tarnon
64.	S C Castanet Nîmes	2-1	Omnisports St Hilaire la Jasse
65.	AS Poulx	1-2	AS Nîmes Athletic
66.	OC Redessan	2-0	Besseges St Ambroix FC
67.	A Espoir et Culture St Gilles	3-0	US Bouillargues
68.	Entente S Pays d'Uzes	4-2	FC Pays Viganais Aigoual
69.	Avenir Castroite	2-4	US Mauguio Carnon
70.	Stade O Aimargues	3-3 (4-1 p)	Stade Beaucairois 30

=== Lorraine ===
The second round is in effect a preliminary tournament, with the main competition starting in the third round.

These matches were played on 23 August 2015.

Second round results: Lorraine

Tie no	Home team (tier)	Score	Away team (tier)
1.	AS Algrange	1-5	Entente S Villerupt-Thil
2.	AS Tucquegnieux Trieux	1-4	RC Nilvange
3.	FC Pierrevillers	1-3 (a.e.t.)	U Lorraine de Plantieres Metz
4.	FC Mondelange	1-4 (a.e.t.)	AS Talange
5.	FC Ecrouves	0-4	RC Champigneulles
6.	CS Thillotin	3-1	FC Le Tholy
7.	O de Mittelbronn 04	2-3	AS Reding

=== Maine ===
These matches were played on 30 August 2015.

Second round results: Maine

Tie no	Home team (tier)	Score	Away team (tier)
1.	US du Pays de Juhel	1-2	Hermine St Ouennaise
2.	AS Contest St Baudelle	3-2	FC Lassay
3.	FC Montjeannais	1-5	Amicale S Andouille
4.	AS Gorronnaise	0-0 (5-4 p)	Stade Mayennais FC
5.	US Cigne	5-4	FC Ambrieres Les Vallees
6.	USC Pays du Montsurs	1-11	Louverne S
7.	US Fougerolles Du Plessis	0-3	CA Evronnais
8.	AS Omnisport Montenay	0-5	L'Erneenne
9.	AS La Baconnierre	0-6	US Aronnaise
10.	CS Javron Neuilly	0-6	Velo S Fertois
11.	US Simple Marigne Peuton	1-5	AS Meslay du Maine
12.	US Dyonisienne	2-1	Etoile S Quelainaise
13.	US St Pierre La Cour	1-3	Entente S Craonnaise
14.	ASL L'Huisserie F	2-3	Ancienne Chateau Gontier
15.	US Forceenne	1-2	La Suze FC
16.	US Le Genest	0-1	Francs Archers de la Bonne Lorraine
17.	AS Loigne Sur Mayanne	2-13	Entente S Bonchamp Les Laval
18.	FC La Selle Craonnaise	2-5	US St Berthevin les Laval
19.	FC Chateau Gontier	0-3	RC Flechois
20.	US Lavalloise	3-3 (5-6 p)	AS du Bourny
21.	US Renazeenne	0-2	Jeanna d'Arc Soulge Sur Ouette
22.	FC Menil	0-4	Amicale S Le Bourgeneuf La Foret
23.	AS St Pavace	1-0	Ecommoy FC
24.	UC Auvers Le Hamon - Poille Sur Vegre	1-2	US St Mars La Briere
25.	SC Tuffe	0-6	AS Le Mans Villaret
26.	US Tennie St Symphorien	3-1	US Bazouges Cre Sur Loir
27.	La Vigilante de Mayet	0-3	Amicale S La Chapelle St Aubin
28.	CA Loue	0-1	Etoile S Connerre
29.	US Bouloire	0-5	Entente S Monceenne
30.	Societe S Noyen Sur Sarthe	0-4	CO St Saturnin Arche
31.	Beaumont SA	0-4	JS Coulaines
32.	JS Parigne L'Eveque	2-4	US Sille Le Guillaume
33.	ASPTT Le Mans	1-2	AS Juigne Sur Sarthe
34.	US Vibraysienne	1-4	CS Change
35.	US Precigne	0-5	AS Mulsanne - Teloche
36.	Esperance S Yvre L'Eveque	1-2	US Arnage Pontlieue
37.	US Savinge L'Eveque	1-4	US Nautique Spay
38.	CS Sablons Gazonfier	6-1	JS Solesmienne
39.	Etoile de la Germiniere	2-1	US Crosmieroise
40.	AS Cerans Foulletourte	0-1	US Roeze
41.	La Patriote Bonnetable	3-5	SA Mamertins
42.	US Mansinge	1-2	C Omnisport Castelorien
43.	Avenir S Ruaudin	1-2	US Guecelard
44.	US Conlie	1-5	Patriote Brulonnaise
45.	US La Chapelle St Remy	0-1	Stade O du Maine

=== Méditerranée ===
These matches were played on 5 and 6 September 2015.

Second round results: Méditerranée

Tie no	Home team (tier)	Score	Away team (tier)
1.	FC Vidauban	0-5	JS St Jean Beaulieu
2.	Etoile S Lorguaise	1-9	AS Maximoise
3.	Barcelonnette FC	1-3	FC de Sisteron
4.	Alliance S Valensole Greoux	3-2	US Meenne
5.	CA Digne 04 F	0-1	Gap Foot 05
6.	Montet Bornala C Nice	0-0 (5-4 p)	Club des Jeunes Antibes F
7.	AS Roquebrune Cap Martin	7-1	Entente S Haute Siagne
8.	FC Villefranchois	5-0	ASPTT Nice
9.	FC de Mougins Côte d'Azur	1-5	US Carqueiranne la Crau
10.	Etoile S Villeneuve Loubet	0-1	St Paul La Colle Omnisport C
11.	St Laurentin St Laurent Du Var	1-2	FC d'Antibes Juan les Pins
12.	FC de Carros	2-2 (4-3 p)	AS Cagnes le Cros F
13.	Entente St Sylvestre Nice Nord	0-3	US Cap D'Ail
14.	Stade de Vallauris	0-2	Trinite SFC
15.	US Mandelieu La Napoule	3-3 (2-3 p)	Rapid Omnisports de Menton
16.	SC Mouans Sartoux	1-0	UA Valettoise
17.	Six Fours Le Brusc FC	3-2	FC Pugetois
18.	FC de l'Etoile et de l'Huveaune	2-0	US 1er Canton
19.	AS Bouc Bel Air	3-2	Avenir S Simiane Collongue
20.	AS Martigues Sud	0-4	US Marseille Endoume Catalans
21.	FC Chateauneuf Les Martigues	0-1	Stade Maillanais
22.	AS Busserine	1-4	AS St Remoise
23.	ASC de Jeunesse Felix Pyat	3-0	AS Mazargues
24.	Etoile S de Greasque	1-5	FC Septemes
25.	JS des Pennes Mirabeau	1-6	AS Gemenosienne
26.	A Amicale S Val St Andre	1-2	AS de l'Etoile du Sud
27.	FSC La Ciotat	5-1	Entente du Haut Var
28.	O Rovenain	1-2	FC Istres Ouest Provence
29.	US Venelloise	1-2	SO Cassis
30.	Salon Bel Air Foot	1-1 (6-7 p)	Etoile S Fosseenne
31.	JS St Julien	4-1	JS Istreenne
32.	JO St Gabriel	0-4	Berre SC
33.	Etoile S Boulbon	3-2	FC Cote Bleue
34.	US Avignonnaise	0-1	Stade Marseillais Universite C
35.	Esperance Pernoise	3-1	FC Rousset Ste Victoria Omnisports
36.	FC Tarascon	0-0 (2-4 p)	Etoile S Pennoise
37.	Calavon FC	0-1	FC Luberon
38.	Entente J Galia C Graveson	2-3	US Entraiguoise
39.	O Novais	2-1	SC Courthezonnais
40.	Boxeland C Islois	2-0	SC Montfavet
41.	US Eygalieres	3-1	RC de Provence
42.	Entente St Jean de Gres	2-0	O Avignonnais
43.	AS des Catalans de Tarascon	0-4	Esperance Sorguaise
44.	US Une Autre Provence	0-2	FA Chateaurenard
45.	FC La Ciotat Ceyreste	2-3	US Pegomas
46.	Dentelles FC	0-1	FA Val Durance
47.	USPEG Marseille	0-5	Etoile S de la Ciotat
48.	ASPTT Heyres	0-2	Gardia C
49.	Pays d'Aix FC	0-2	O St Maximinois
50.	AS de l'Esterel	1-0	SO Lavandou
51.	Le Val Bessillon	1-3	RC Grasse
52.	SC Dracenie	1-2 (a.e.t.)	Stade O Londais
53.	Entente FC Seynois	2-3	Avenir S Gardannais
54.	AC Port de Bouc	2-1	A Regard d'Avenir Multiculturel
55.	Sollies Farlede	0-6	AS Cannes
56.	S Loisirs Hospital Intercommunal Toulon Seyne Mer	0-1	Bormes Mimosas S
57.	AS Gignacaise	1-3	Entente Union Generale Armenienne AS Ardziv Marseille
58.	O Montelais	3-1	SC Jonquieros

=== Paris-Île-de-France ===
These matches were played from 27 May to 28 June 2015. Second round results: Paris Île-de-France (incomplete)

Tie no	Home team (tier)	Score	Away team (tier)
1.	Paris Est Solitaire	1-5	US Palaiseau
2.	FC Tremblay (8)	3-0 (w/o)	US Longjumeau (11)
3.	Lissois FC (11)	4-3	Cesson VSD (9)

== Third round ==
=== Mayotte ===
These matches was played on 9 May 2015.

Third round results: Mayotte

Tie no	Home team (tier)	Score	Away team (tier)
1.	(Mayotte) AS Rosador	2–0 (a.e.t.)	ASC Kawéni (Mayotte)
2.	(Mayotte) Voulvavi sports	2–3	ASC Abeilles M'tsamboro (Mayotte)
3.	(Mayotte) USC Labattoir	1–1 (2–3 p)	Tchanga SC (Mayotte)
4.	(Mayotte) AS Neige	0–1	AS Racine du nord (Mayotte)
5.	(Mayotte) FC Mtsapéré	1–0	Etincelles Hamjago (Mayotte)
6.	(Mayotte) FC Chiconi	4–5 (a.e.t.)	AJ Kani-kéli (Mayotte)
7.	(Mayotte) Diables noirs	0–1	UCS Sada (Mayotte)
8.	(Mayotte) Flamme Hajangoua	2–5	AS Jumeaux de M'zouazia (Mayotte)

=== Guadeloupe ===
These matches were played on 12, 13 and 26 September 2015.

Third round results: Guadeloupe

Tie no	Home team (tier)	Score	Away team (tier)
1.	(Guadeloupe) E. de Morne à L'Eau	2–1	USC de Bananier (Guadeloupe)
2.	(Guadeloupe) AC de Marie Galante	2–0	Juvenis (Guadeloupe)
3.	(Guadeloupe) AV. Saint Rosien	1–2	ASC Red Star de Point (Guadeloupe)
4.	(Guadeloupe) US Baie Mahaultienne	4–0	Cactus Sainte Anne (Guadeloupe)

Tie no	Home team (tier)	Score	Away team (tier)
5.	(Guadeloupe) Phare Petit du Canal	0–1	ASC Juventus Sainte Anne (Guadeloupe)
6.	(Guadeloupe) Arsenal C.	0–2	Gauloise de Basse Terre (Guadeloupe)
7.	(Guadeloupe) CS Saint-Francǫis	1–4	CS Le Moule (Guadeloupe)
8.	(Guadeloupe) J.S. Abymienne	0–4	US Sainte Rose (Guadeloupe)

=== Réunion ===
These matches were played on 11 and 12 July 2015.

Third round results: Réunion

Tie no	Home team (tier)	Score	Away team (tier)
1.	(Réunion) FC Avirons	0–2	Saint-Denis FC (Réunion)
2.	(Réunion) SS Capricorne	2–0	JCV Saint-Pierre (Réunion)
3.	(Réunion) FC 17e km	0–7	AS Excelsior (Réunion)
4.	(Réunion) Saint-Pauloise FC	5–0	ES Etang-Salé (Réunion)
5.	(Réunion) FC Ligne-Paradis	2–2 (3–4 p)	AS MJC Ste-Suzanne (Réunion)
6.	(Réunion) AFC Halte-La	1–2 (a.e.t.)	S.D.E.F.A. (Réunion)
7.	(Réunion) Tampon FC	1–3	SS Jeanne d'Arc (Réunion)
8.	(Réunion) AJS Ouest	1–1 (6–5 p)	JS Piton St-Leu (Réunion)
9.	(Réunion) Cilaos FC	1–1 (3–4 p)	AS Marsouins (Réunion)
10.	(Réunion) ES Ste-Suzanne Bagatelle	0–2	US Bénédictine (Réunion)
11.	(Réunion) AJ Petite-Île	2–0	AF St-Louis (Réunion)
12.	(Réunion) ACS Redoute	1–5	JS Saint-Pierroise (Réunion)
13.	(Réunion) La Tamponnaise	1–3	US Sainte-Marienne (Réunion)
14.	(Réunion) A.S Etoile du Sud	0–1	SS Saint-Louisienne (Réunion)
15.	(Réunion) ASC Monaco	0–1	Trois-Bassins FC (Réunion)
16.	(Réunion) OCSA Léopards	1–0	ASC Grands-Bois (Réunion)

=== Alsace ===
These matches were played from 2 to 20 September.

Third round results: Alsace

Tie no	Home team (tier)	Score	Away team (tier)
1.	US Ittenheim (8)	0-4	AS Pierots Vauban Strasbourg (DH)
2.	FC Drusenheim (10)	2-4	FCSR Haguenau (CFA2)
3.	FC Soultz ss/Forets (8)	2-1	US Reipertswiller (DH)
4.	FC Wittisheim (11)	0-6	SC Dinsheim (DH)
5.	AS Hohwarth St Pierre Bois (9)	0-1	LA S Molsheim (7)
6.	RC 1922 Kintzheim (10)	0-4	CERC S Fegersheim (9)
7.	AS 1919 Huningue (9)	1-2	AS Blotzheim (8)
8.	AS Ribeauville (11)	0-0 (p)	FC Bennwihr (8)
9.	FC Soleil Bischheim (DH)	3-1	US Oberlauterbach (DH)
10.	AS Bergbieten (8)	0-4	FC Eckbolsheim (8)
11.	AS Betschdorf 1935 (8)	5-2	SC Roppenheim (9)
12.	FC Dahlenheim (11)	1-1 (5-4 p)	Still 1930 (8)
13.	FC Dambach Neunhoffen (12)	4-3	AS de Laubach (13)
14.	ASL Duntzenheim (10)	1-4	AS Erstein (DH)
15.	FC Durrenbach (10)	1-3	US Turcs Bischwiller (8)
16.	SC Ebersheim (9)	2-1	FC Entzheim (10)
17.	FC Geudertheim (10)	0-1	FCE Schirrhein (7)
18.	US Gumbrechtshoffen (10)	2-4	AS Gambsheim (9)
19.	FC Haslach (12)	2-4	AS Ingwiller (9)
20.	AS Hunspach (8)	0-1	FC St Etienne Seltz (8)
21.	FA Illkirch Graffenstaden (DH)	3-1	AS Intercoommunale Av Durestel (7)
22.	FC Krautergersheim (11)	1-3	FC des S Reunis Obernai (DH)
23.	AS Lauterbourg (10)	4-2 (a.e.t.)	AS Seebach (11)
24.	STE S Weyersheim (7)	3-2	FC Eschbach (8)
25.	FC Marmoutier (11)	2-6	FC Obermodern (8)
26.	FC Matzenheim (12)	3-1	FC Eschau (9)
27.	FC Niederschaeffolsheim (12)	0-6	AS Kilstett (9)
28.	AS Ohlungen (8)	3-1	FC Steinseltz (7)
29.	SC Drulingen (7)	1-2	FC Kronenbourg Strasbourg (7)
30.	ET S Romanswiller (11)	1-1 (5-6 p)	ASC Portugais Val de la Bruche (12)
31.	FC Rossfeld (8)	1-3	FC Geispolsheim 01 (DH)
32.	FC Saverne (7)	1-0	AS Bischoffsheim (8)
33.	OC Lipsheim (11)	1-7	AS Elsau Portugais Strasbourg (7)
34.	Olympique Strasbourg (7)	0-2	SC Schiltigheim (CFA2)
35.	CS Ste Croix Aux Mines (12)	1-2 (a.e.t.)	S Reunis Hoenheim (9)
36.	FC Truchtersheim (11)	0-2	AS Strasbourg (9)
37.	FA Du Val de Moder Uberach (11)	0-2	CS Mars 05 Bischheim (8)
38.	AS Wahlenheim Bernolsheim (12)	0-0 (4-3 p)	US Schleithal (10)
39.	CS Waldhambach (11)	2-3	S Reunis Dorlisheim (11)
40.	AS Westhouse (11)	0-9	AS Ernolsheim S/Bruche (7)
41.	AS Wingen S/Moder (10)	2-0	AS de la Bruche Schirmeck-Labroque (11)
42.	FC Baldersheim (9)	0-2	FC Hagenthal 1959 (7)
43.	FC Ballersdorf (8)	2-5	FC Kembs Reunis (7)
44.	FC Ingersheim (9)	1-3 (a.e.t.)	AS Berrwiller Hartmannswiller (7)
45.	AS Burnhaupt Le Bas (9)	0-1	FC Hirtzbach (DH)
46.	SC Cernay (8)	3-0 (a.e.t.)	FC Niederhergheim (9)
47.	AS Mahorais de Colmar (12)	0-4	FC Illhaeusern (7)
48.	FC Fessenheim (9)	0-5	ASC Biesheim (CFA2)
49.	FC Grussenheim (11)	2-1	US Wittenheim (7)
50.	US Hirsingue (9)	1-2	AS Mertzen (9)
51.	FC Hirtzfelden (8)	0-2	Real Mulhouse CF (8)
52.	FC Horbourg Wihr (9)	2-0	AS Sundhoffen (7)
53.	AGIIR Florival (8)	5-1	S Reunis Kaysersberg (9)
54.	ASL Koetzingue (7)	3-4	FC Hegenheim (DH)
55.	AS Lutterbach (11)	2-4	FC Feldkirch (11)
56.	Montreux S (11)	0-5	AS Illzach Modenheim (CFA2)
57.	FC Roderen (11)	0-2	FC Burnhaupt le Haut (7)
58.	FC Ostheim (9)	3-0	FC Kingersheim (7)
59.	FC Rosenau (12)	1-3	FC Uffheim (8)
60.	FC Sierentz (7)	2-1	FC Illfurth (8)
61.	Racing HW 96 (7)	5-2	Alliance S Blanc Vieux Thann (8)
62.	FC Village Neuf (12)	4-1	AS Hochstatt (9)
63.	AS Aspach le Haut (12)	1-2	FC Merxheim (9)
64.	AS Hochfelden (9)	2-0	E Bleue Achenheim (9)
65.	AS Mussig (10)	1-2	ASL Robertsau (7)
66.	FC Ernolsheim les Saverne (13)	0-2	AS Menora Strasbourg (9)

=== Aquitaine ===
These matches were played between 12 and 20 September 2015.

Third round results: Aquitaine

Tie no	Home team (tier)	Score	Away team (tier)
1.	Elan Bearnais d'Orthez (7)	2-2 (4-5 p)	Langon FC (DH)
2.	FC Tartas Saint Yaguen (7)	0-3 (a.e.t.)	Les Genêts d'Anglet Football (CFA2)
3.	FC de St Medard en Jalles (DH)	1-0	FC du Luy de Bearn (7)
4.	Prigonrieux FC (8)	4-2	Colayrac FC (9)
5.	FC Espagnol de Pau (10)	3-6	US Castetis Gouze (11)
6.	FC Medoc Ocean (9)	4-3	Biscarrosse Olympique (7)
7.	St Paul S (8)	2-0	FA Morlaas Est Bearn (8)
8.	Entente Haute Bearn (12)	4-2	JS Rionnaise F (11)
9.	US St Michel Arudy (10)	2-1	Les Coqs Rouges Bordeaux (8)
10.	AS Tarnos Dite A Federative (10)	2-3	Seignosse Capbreton Soustons FC (8)
11.	Avenue Mourenxois (7)	1-2	La Jeanne d'Arc de Biarritz (DH)
12.	AS Mazeres Uzos Rontignon (9)	1-0	Entente S Blanquefortaise (7)
13.	La Jeanne d'Arc de Bearn Pau (9)	4-1	Labenne OSC (10)
14.	Arin Luzien (7)	2-1	FC Ecureuils Merignac Arlac (DH)
15.	US Bouscataise (8)	0-2	SA G Cestas (DH)
16.	Amicale Laique et Bourg Sports (9)	2-1	FC Pessac Alouette (8)
17.	Stade Pessacaise UC (11)	0-4	FC des Portes de l'Entre Deux Mers (7)
18.	FC Gironde La Reole (9)	0-4	Elan Boucalais (8)
19.	SC La Bastidienne (10)	2-3	Etoile S Eysinaise (7)
20.	AS Villandraut Prechac (11)	0-7	Jeunesse Villenavaise (CFA2)
21.	Hiriburuko Ainhara St Pierre Irube (7)	3-1	FC Oloronais (7)
22.	Entente S Bruges (9)	1-2 (a.e.t.)	US Lormont (DH)
23.	ASSA Pays du Dropt (9)	2-0	RC de Bordeaux Metropole (8)
24.	FC du Grand Saint Emilionnais (7)	3-0	FC Sarlat Marcillac (DH)
25.	US Tocane St Apre (11)	0-2	La Joyeuse St Sulpice et Cameyra (10)
26.	FC Pays du Mareuil (10)	1-6	FC Bassin d'Arcachon (DH)
27.	Confluent Football 47 (11)	0-7	Amicale S Gensac Montcaret (9)
28.	US St Denis de Pile (10)	1-4	Izon Vayres FC (8)
29.	AS Antonne le Change (9)	0-2	FC Marmande 47 (CFA2)
30.	US Galgonaise (10)	0-3	US Mussidan St Medard (9)
31.	FC Estuaire Haute Gironde (7)	1-0	CO Coulonieix Chamiers (7)
32.	FC Pays Beaumontois (11)	1-2	SU Agenais (7)
33.	US Cenon Rive Droite (8)	0-1	FC Libourne (DH)
34.	Les Gars d'Albret de Labrit (10)	1-2	Union St Bruno FC SAB (9)
35.	Landes Girondines FC (10)	1-1 (4-5 p)	AS St Aubin de Medoc (10)
36.	CA Ste Helene (8)	1-2	Sp A Merignacais (DH)
37.	FC Arsac Lepian Medoc (9)	3-0	CS Lantonnais (10)
38.	Etoile S Canejan (7)	0-1	Stade St Medardais (7)
39.	US Alliance Talencaise (8)	1-1 (4-2 p)	La Brede FC (DH)
40.	Les Croises de St Andre Bayonne (7)	0-1	US Lege Cap Ferret (CFA2)
41.	ES d'Audenge (9)	3-1	Andernos Sport FC (8)
42.	FC Thenon Limeyrat Fossemagne (8)	2-1	Etoile S Boulazac (8)

=== Atlantique ===
These matches were played 12 and 13 September 2015.

Third round results: Atlantique

Tie no	Home team (tier)	Score	Away team (tier)
1.	Entente Sud Vendee (11)	0-2	Vendee Poire Sur Vie Football (CFA2)
2.	Etoile de Clisson (9)	1-0	US Jeanne d'Arc Carquefou (DH)
3.	FC Des Trois Rivieres (12)	1-7	St Nazaire Atlantique Football (DH)
4.	Vaillante S Angers (7)	4-3	Amicale S La Chataigneraie (7)
5.	Les Aiglons Durtalois de Durtal (12)	1-7	FC Reze (DH)
6.	Avenire S Bouffere (9)	0-1 (a.e.t.)	AS Bayard Saumur St Hilaire St Florent (8)
7.	AC St Brevin (9)	0-6	US Ste Anne de Vertou (CFA2)
8.	Entente S Maritime Piriac Turballe (10)	1-4	St Marc F (11)
9.	La Vigilante de St Fulgent (9)	2-0	Montreuil-Juigne Bene Football (10)
10.	Etoile S Grosbreuil (10)	1-3	Fuilet Chaussaire FC (11)
11.	Entente S La Romagne Roussay (11)	0-2	Les Ecureuils des Pays de Monts (9)
12.	Pouzauges Reaumir AC (7)	4-0	AC Basse Goulaine (8)
13.	AS Avant Garde Haye Fouassiere (8)	1-1 (5-6 p)	JSC Bellevue Nantes (8)
14.	Etoile S Du Lac St Lumine de Coutais (12)	0-3	Foyer Esperance de Trelaze (7)
15.	Nort AC (8)	1-1 (3-2 p)	Amicale Laique Chateaubriant (9)
16.	FC Generaudiere Roche Sud (10)	1-5	Esp S de Bouchemaine (7)
17.	Etoile S La Copechagniere (12)	2-1	Christopheseguiniere (10)
18.	FC Beaupreau (8)	2-3	Intrepide Angers F (8)
19.	Stade Olonne Sur Mer (9)	2-1	US Thouareenne (8)
20.	AS Seiches Sur Le Loir Marce (9)	5-3 (a.e.t.)	ASC St Medard de Doulon Nantes (10)
21.	ES Vertou Foot (12)	2-4 (a.e.t.)	US Loire et Divatte (8)
22.	SS Antigny St Maurice de Noues (11)	3-2 (a.e.t.)	Union St Leger des Bois St Germain des Pres Champtoce sur Loire Avenir (11)
23.	FC des Portugais de Cholet (11)	0-1	US Autonome Pouance (8)
24.	St Pierre de Retz - St Pere en Retz (7)	0-2	FC Challans (CFA2)
25.	Sud Vendee Football Benet Damvix Maille (8)	2-3 (a.e.t.)	AS St Hilaire Vihiers St Paul (9)
26.	ASPTT - CAEB Cholet (10)	1-0 (a.e.t.)	Mouilleron Le Captif Sp (7)
27.	Amicale Ecoles Pont Rousseau Reze (9)	0-8	Entente S Segre (DH)
28.	US La Baule - Le Pouliguen (7)	0-2 (a.e.t.)	Tigres Vendee Etoile Chaumoise 85 Les Sables-D'Olonne (DH)
29.	Fay-Bouvron AC (12)	1-4 (a.e.t.)	AC Chapelain Chappelle Sur Erdre (DH)
30.	FC des Achards (9)	1-0	L'Hermenault FC Plaine et Bocage (9)
31.	Entente S L'Aubance Brissac Quince (11)	4-0	St Philbert du Pont Charrault Reorthe Jaudonniere FC (12)
32.	Chatelais FC (10)	3-0	Entente S du Layon (9)
33.	FC Ste Cecile St Martin Des Noyers (10)	2-3	Entente S Cote de Lumiere La Tranche Angles (8)
34.	FC Belligne St Sauveur (9)	0-4	Etoile S Ornaysienne F Vendee La Roche Sur Yon (7)
35.	Les Marsouins Bretignollais F (8)	1-1 (3-1 p)	US Bequots Lucquois (8)
36.	AS Sion Lusanger (12)	1-4	RC Ancenis 44 (8)
37.	Avenir Regriperois Crepinois Tilliers (11)	0-9	Olympique Saumur FC (DH)
38.	La St Andre (9)	0-2	AS Sautronnaise (8)
39.	AS Tierce Cheffes (8)	1-3	Orvault Sports Football (DH)
40.	La Saint Pierre de Nantes (10)	1-2	Elan de Gorges (9)
41.	Etoile S St Dennis La Chevasse (9)	0-1	FC Robretieres La Roche Sur Yon (7)
42.	FC Bouaye (9)	1-0	La Chaize FEC (7)
43.	AS Grandchamps des Fontaines (12)	0-6	St Aubin Guerande (7)
44.	Avenir S Saint Pierre Montrevault (8)	1-4	La Roche Vendee Football (CFA2)
45.	Amicale Dolaysienne (11)	3-0	Entente S de Pornichet (9)
46.	FC Pellouailles Corze (9)	2-1	Andreze La Jubaudiere Jallais FC (10)
47.	US Briolletaine Briollay (11)	0-6	FC Montaigu (7)
48.	US St Aubin des Chateaux (12)	1-6	La Malouine St Malo de Guersac (8)
49.	Mormaison US Sulpice Andre Mormaison (10)	0-4	FC Essartais (7)
50.	La Fraternelle Mortagne Sur Sevre (11)	1-0	Orvault RC (12)
51.	Flocelliere Chamon Sevre (8)	3-3 (4-1 p)	ASR Machecoul (9)
52.	Geneston AS Sud Loire (9)	1-2	Mareuil SC (8)
53.	Pornic Foot (10)	2-3	Union Fraternelle St Herblain (7)
54.	US Beaufort En Valle (8)	1-1 (5-4 p)	SC Notre Dame des Champs Angers (9)
55.	US Maze (9)	1-3	SC Beaucouzé (DH)
56.	US Ste Luce Sur Loire (8)	3-1	La Mellinet de Nantes (7)
57.	St Cyr Herbignac (12)	0-1	FC de La Chappelle Des Marais (DH)

=== Auvergne ===
These matches were played 12 and 13 September 2015.

Third round results: Auvergne

Tie no	Home team (tier)	Score	Away team (tier)
1.	Retournac SP (9)	0-1	AS Chadrac (7)
2.	CS de Bessay (9)	0-3	RC de Vichy (DH)
3.	Sp Chataigneraie Cantal (7)	0-3	FC Aurillac Arpajon Cantal Auvergne (CFA2)
4.	FC de Bezenet (9)	1-5	Montlucon Football (DH)
5.	AS Chassenard Luneau (10)	1-2	A Amicale Lapalissoise (7)
6.	FC Ally Mauriac (8)	1-2	Sud Cantal Foot (9)
7.	US Cere et Landes (10)	1-5	Cercle S Arpajonnais (8)
8.	US Beaumontoise (8)	2-0	Domes Sancy Foot (9)
9.	US St Gervaisienne (9)	0-5	CS de Volvic (DH)
10.	AS Enval-Marsat (8)	1-2	US St Beauzire (8)
11.	FC Chamalières (DH)	2-6	SA Thiernois (CFA2)
12.	AS Romagnnat (8)	0-1	La Combelle Charbonnier A Breui (8)
13.	US St Victor (9)	0-4	JS St Priest des Champs (8)
14.	US de Doyet (9)	3-2	FC Souvignyssois (7)
15.	SC Avermoise (8)	2-3	AS Dompierroise (8)
16.	US Lignerolles Lavault St Anne (9)	1-3	AS Domeratoise (DH)
17.	Ballon Beaulonnais (10)	1-3	Stade St Yorrais (8)
18.	SC Gannatois (9)	0-2	SC Amicale Cussetois (8)
19.	SC St Pourcinois (8)	2-0	US Vendatoise (8)
20.	AS Nord Vignoble (9)	1-5	US St Georges les Ancizes (DH)
21.	US Aspre Maronne (9)	3-5	US Crandelloise (8)
22.	Amicale S Sasacoise (8)	0-2	Ytrac Foot (DH)
23.	FC Massiac Molompize Blesle (7)	3-2 (a.e.t.)	Entente Stade Riomoise-Condat (8)
24.	US Vallee de l'Authre (7)	1-2	US Sanfloraine (DH)
25.	AS Polignac (DH)	4-1	US Arsac En Velay (8)
26.	FC Espaly (7)	4-0	AS Emblavez - Vorey (8)
27.	FC Aurec (10)	0-2	A Vergongheon - Arvant (7)
28.	US Monistrol Sur Loire (8)	1-2	AS Cheminots Langeac (9)
29.	US Blavozy (7)	2-0	Entente Nord Lozere F (DH)
30.	A des Guineens de la Region Auvergne FC (12)	2-3	US Murataise (7)
31.	Entente FC St Amant et Tallende (9)	3-4	FC Cournon d'Auvergne (CFA2)
32.	Cebazat Sp (8)	3-4	Aulnat Sp (9)
33.	US Courpieroise (9)	2-4	US Vic Le Comte (8)
34.	US Ennezat (9)	0-0 (5-3 p)	Lempdes Sp (7)
35.	FC Lezoux (8)	2-0	US Maringuoise (9)
36.	CS St Bonnet Pres Riom (10)	0-5	Esp Ceyratoise (8)
37.	AS de Tronget (10)	0-0 (2-4 p)	AS Mercy-Chapeau (10)

=== Lower Normandy ===
These matches were played on 12 and 13 September 2015.

Third round results: Lower Normandy

Tie no	Home team (tier)	Score	Away team (tier)
1.	US Villers Boucage (9)	2-3	AF Virois (6)
2.	CS Honfleur (8)	0-1	ASPTT Caen (CFA2)
3.	Maladrerie OS (DH)	3-0	Elan S Carpiquet (7)
4.	US Ouviere Normande Mondeville (DH)	2-0	A de Jeunesses S Ouistreham (7)
5.	FC du Pays Aiglon (8)	0-8	US Alenconnaise 61 (DH)
6.	US Semilly St Andre (9)	1-0	AS Querquevillaise F (9)
7.	US Ste Croix de St Lo (9)	2-3 (a.e.t.)	Etoile S Pointe de la Hague (7)
8.	US Ouest Cotentin (9)	1-3 (a.e.t.)	Bayeux FC (DH)
9.	FC Equeurdreville Hainneville (7)	4-0	FC des Etangs (8)
10.	US Roncey Cerisy (9)	1-9	AS de Cherbourg F (DH)
11.	CS Carentanais (7)	2-3	Agneaux FC (7)
12.	UC Bricquebetaise F (8)	1-2	FC St Lo Manche (CFA2)
13.	AS Pointe Cotentin (11)	0-5	Reveil St Germain Courseulles (DH)
14.	AS St Vigor Le Grand (8)	2-6	SC Herouvillais (DH)
15.	Etoile S Marigny Lozon Mesnil Vigot (10)	1-3	Cambes En Plaine Sp (8)
16.	LC Bretteville Sur Odon (8)	2-0	Entente Cantonale Tessy Moyon Sports (9)
17.	Etoile S Thury Harcourt (10)	0-8	US Granvillaise (CFA2)
18.	Esp St Jean Champs (8)	0-4	FC Flerien (DH)
19.	CO Ceauce (9)	1-1 (3-4 p)	FC Agon Coutainville (7)
20.	A Les Leopards de St Georges (8)	0-0 (4-2 p)	US Ducey (DH)
21.	Etoile S Isigny Le Buat (11)	0-5	US D'Andaine (9)
22.	Entente S Coutancaise (7)	0-2	US St Pairaise (8)
23.	AS Brecey (8)	0-1	CS Villedieu (8)
24.	Etoile S Livarotaise (10)	0-2	CA Lisieux F Pays d'Auge (8)
25.	Bourguebus Soliers FC (8)	2-0	USC Mezidon Football (9)
26.	AS Potigny-Villers Canivet-Ussy (9)	2-1	AS Ifs (7)
27.	FC Argentan (7)	4-1	US Mortagnaise (8)
28.	AS Berd Huis Football (9)	0-9	AS Trouville Deauville (DH)
29.	AS Avenir St Germain Du Corbeis (10)	1-4	SU Divaise (DH)
30.	US Houlgate (9)	5-0	Entente S Pays Ouche (8)

=== Bourgogne ===
These matches were played on 12, 13 and 20 September 2015.

Third round results: Bourgogne

Tie no	Home team (tier)	Score	Away team (tier)
1.	Fontaine Les Dijon FC (7)	1-4	SC Selongeen (CFA2)
2.	F Reunis de St Marcel (DH)	1-1 (8-9 p)	AS La Chappelle De Guinchay (7)
3.	US Luzy Millay (10)	2-3	A Chalonnaise F (8)
4.	AS Garchizy (7)	2-0	Nevers Football (DH)
5.	AS St Vincent Bragny (9)	1-2	US Charitoise (7)
6.	US Blanzynoise F (9)	1-1 (4-2 p)	Sud Nivernais Imphy-Decize (DH)
7.	RC Nevers-Challuy Sermoise (8)	4-0	Digion FCA (8)
8.	US de Coulanges Les Nevers (9)	0-1	US Cheminot de Paray F (DH)
9.	J Ouvriere du Creusot (8)	3-0	ASC Pouguoise (8)
10.	FC de La Roche Vineuse (10)	0-2	FC Gueugnonnais (CFA2)
11.	US de St Bonnet La Guiche (7)	0-1	US St Serninoise (7)
12.	FC Chalon (DH)	1-1 (2-3 p)	Louhans Cuiseaux FC (DH)
13.	JS Maconnaise (8)	0-4	A Loisirs Culture Longvic (7)
14.	US St Martin Senozan (11)	0-2	Entente Fauverney Rouvres Bretenier (8)
15.	AS St Apollinaire (7)	0-2	AS Chatenoy Le Royal (7)
16.	US de Meursault (7)	1-3	Reveil Is Sur Tille (7)
17.	Chevigny St Sauveur F (7)	5-0	AS de Sornay (7)
18.	UF Maconnais (DH)	4-0	CS Auxonnais (7)
19.	AS Genlis (8)	4-2	FC Corgoloin Ladoix (9)
20.	SC Chateaurenaud (12)	1-3 (a.e.t.)	FC Abergement de Cuisery (9)
21.	ASC de Plombiers (8)	0-3	CO Avallonnais (DH)
22.	FC de Champs (9)	0-4	AS Clamecycoise (7)
23.	US Semur En Auxois Epoisses (8)	4-2	US Joigny (7)
24.	FC Saulon Corcelles (10)	11-0	Cosnois FC (11)
25.	AS Quetigny (DH)	1-2	FC Sens (CFA2)
26.	AS Beaunoise (DH)	0-1	Paron FC (DH)
27.	AS Magny (10)	1-2	US de Varennes (8)
28.	ES Appoigny (9)	2-2 (5-6 p)	Cercle S Laique Chenove (9)
29.	FC St Remy (10)	1-4	Montbard Venarey F (8)
30.	Stade Auxerrois (7)	3-1	FC du Gatinais en Bourgogne (8)
31.	FC Chassagne Montrachet (10)	4-2 (a.e.t.)	US Cluny F (8)

=== Centre-Val de Loire ===
These matches were played on 12 and 13 September 2015.

Third round results: Centre-Val de Loire

Tie no	Home team (tier)	Score	Away team (tier)
1.	US Municipale Olivet (8)	1-8	FC Drouais Dreux (CFA2)
2.	Vierzon FC (DH)	2-0	Etoile Bleue St Cyr Sur Loire (7)
3.	FC St Doulchard (8)	2-0	FC Deolois Deols (DH)
4.	CS Municipal Sully Sur Loire (8)	3-0	OC Chateaudun (8)
5.	Amicale des Jeunes du Secteur de Mont et Bracieux (8)	0-2	FC Chartres (CFA2)
6.	Vineuil S (DH)	0-3	Blois F 41 (DH)
7.	US Municipale Montgaris F (DH)	1-0 (a.e.t.)	Entente S Gatinaise Ferrieres (7)
8.	SC Massay (10)	1-2	US Vendome (8)
9.	Entente S Marigny Les Usages (11)	1-2	US Chitenay Cellettes (9)
10.	J3S Amilly (7)	2-5 (a.e.t.)	FC St George Sur Eure (7)
11.	CA St Laurent Nouan F (10)	1-4	CS Mainvilliers F (7)
12.	Avenir S Chateauneuf En Thymerais (8)	1-0	FC Municipal Ingre (9)
13.	US Balgentienne Val de Loire Beaugency (7)	1-2	CA Pithiviers (7)
14.	C Deport Espagnol Orleans (10)	0-2 (a.e.t.)	US Municipale Saran (DH)
15.	ASC des Portugais Blois (9)	4-0	RC Bouzy Les Bordes (10)
16.	US Chateauneuf Sur Loire (7)	2-0	AFC Blois 1995 (7)
17.	US La Chatre (8)	2-1	SA Issoudon (7)
18.	Joue Les Tours FC Touraine (8)	2-1 (a.e.t.)	Entente S Trouy (8)
19.	FC St Jean Le Blanc (7)	1-3 (a.e.t.)	FC Richelieu (8)
20.	J Amicale S Moulins Sur Cephons (11)	1-10	Bourges Foot (DH)
21.	US Chateaumeillant (10)	0-3	Entente AS Orval (8)
22.	Entente S Veretz Larcay (10)	1-3	SC Azay Le Rideau - Cheille (8)
23.	FC de l'Ouest Tourangeau 37 (7)	3-1	St Georges Descartes (8)
24.	US St Maur (8)	4-3 (a.e.t.)	AS Chanceaux Sur Choiselle (9)
25.	Alerte S de Fondettes (10)	0-8	Bourges 18 (CFA2)
26.	Societe S La Solognote Souesmes (9)	0-10	Avoine O Chinon Cinais (CFA2)
27.	US Le Poinconnet (9)	0-8	St Pryve St Hilaire FC (CFA2)

=== Centre-West ===
These matches were played on 12 and 13 September 2015.

Third round results: Centre-West

Tie no	Home team (tier)	Score	Away team (tier)
1.	Aunis Avenir FC (9)	0-1	US St Sauveur (7)
2.	Elan S Oyre Dange (9)	0-3	FC Bressuire (CFA2)
3.	Amicale S Soyaux (7)	1-0	SC St Jean D'Angely (7)
4.	ES Saintes F (7)	2-4	Angoulême Charente FC (CFA2)
5.	Entente S Celles-Verennes (9)	2-4	FC Nord 17 (9)
6.	US Anais (12)	3-1	ACG Foot Sud 86 (12)
7.	US Chasseneuil (9)	2-7	SO Chatellerault (CFA2)
8.	JS Sireuil (8)	2-4	US Marennaise (9)
9.	CS Bussac Foret (10)	3-6 (a.e.t.)	OFC de Ruelle (8)
10.	Cercle A Egletons (10)	0-3	US Bessines-Mortrerolles (8)
11.	Entente S Marchoise Noth St Priest la Feuille (8)	1-1 (2-4 p)	Tulle F Correze (7)
12.	ES Ardin (11)	1-0	AS Maritime de Nieul Sur Mer (9)
13.	FC Chauray (DH)	2-0 (a.e.t.)	ES Buxerolles (7)
14.	CA St Savin St Germain (8)	2-1	Avenir S Echire St Gelais (DH)
15.	US Entente Couzeix-Chaptelat (9)	1-2	Avenir S de Gouzon (7)
16.	Mayotte FC de Limoges (10)	1-2	Entente S Ussel (11)
17.	CA Rilhac Rancon (7)	2-1	US Donzenacoise (8)
18.	US Brossac (12)	0-4	St Palais S (8)
19.	CO La Couronne (11)	1-3	Amicale S Cozes (DH)
20.	SC Mouthiers (9)	1-4	US Chauvigny (DH)
21.	JS Suris (11)	2-3	U Etoile S Montmorillon (DH)
22.	U Amicale St Sulpice De Cognac (10)	1-5	Royan Vaux Atlantique FC (DH)
23.	Avenir S de la Baie (11)	2-3	UA Niort St Florent (9)
24.	A des Anciens de l'Avenir Maritime Laleu La Pallice (10)	2-1	Entente S Chanteloup-Chapelle (10)
25.	La Rochelle Villeneuve FC (8)	1-0	AS Portugais Niort (8)
26.	AS Beynat (10)	2-1	AS Aixe Sur Vienne (7)
27.	AS Jugeals Noailles (8)	2-1	JA Isle (DH)
28.	Varetz AC (7)	1-2	CS Feytiat (DH)
29.	US de Grand Bourg (11)	0-7	Limoges FC (CFA2)
30.	Avenir S Aiffres (9)	1-4	Poitiers FC (DH)
31.	Elan S Aubinrothais (10)	2-3 (a.e.t.)	Antran S Loisirs (9)
32.	FC Pays Argentonnais (10)	0-3	CA Neuville (7)
33.	Entente S Beaulieu - Breuil (11)	2-2 (5-4 p)	US Melusine Lusignan (10)
34.	CS Beauvoir Sur Niort (11)	1-0	FC du Confolentais (10)
35.	SA Montcoutant (9)	1-2 (a.e.t.)	Cap Aunis ASPTT FC (8)
36.	Esperance Terves ES (8)	2-1	La Ligugeenne (7)
37.	US Vasleenne (10)	0-6	Entente S La Rochelle (DH)
38.	FC Vrines (11)	1-2	Entente S Beaumont St Cyr (9)
39.	Entente S Brion St Secondin (11)	2-6	Amicale S Puymoyen (10)
40.	FC Fleure (10)	0-6	Thouars Foot 79 (DH)
41.	Entente S des Trois Cites Poitiers (8)	2-0	Entente S St Cerbouille (9)
42.	AS Cheminots Poitiers Biard (12)	1-3	US Combranssiere (8)
43.	ES Nouaille (7)	0-3	OL St Liguaire Niort (DH)
44.	JS Semussacaise (10)	1-4	U Amicale Cognac F (DH)
45.	US Usson Du Poitou (12)	3-3 (2-4 p)	La Roche-Rivieres FC Tardoire (10)
46.	AS Aiguille Bosmie Charroux (12)	0-8	Entente S Gueretoise (7)
47.	AS Panazol (10)	4-2	AS de St Pantaleon De Larche (DH)
48.	SC Verneuil Sur Vienne (9)	3-0	CA Meymacois (7)

=== Corsica ===
The competition starts at the third round in Corsica, due to the small number of team participating.

These matches were played on 12, 13 and 20 September 2015.

Third round results: Corsica

Tie no	Home team (tier)	Score	Away team (tier)
1.	Borgo FC (CFA2)	4-0	FC U Niolu (9)
2.	US des Clubs du Cortenais (DH)	1-0	AS D'Antisanti (9)
3.	AJ Biguglia (DH)	1-0	AS Porto Vecchio (DH)
4.	Gallia C de Lucciana (DH)	2-0	AS du Nebbiu Conca d'Oru (DH)
5.	FC Ajaccio (8)	1-0	JO Sartenaise (9)
6.	JS de Monticello (9)	2-4	AS Furiani Agliani (DH)
7.	AS Luri (9)	0-1	SC Bocognano Gravona (DH)
8.	Espoir C Bastais (7)	2-0	JS Bonifacio (7)
9.	US Ghisonaccia (7)	7-2	Afa FA (7)
10.	FC Costa Verde (7)	0-4	Etoile Filante Bastiase (DH)
11.	F Balagne Ile Rousse (CFA2)	3-2	AS de la Casinca (7)
12.	FC Bastelicaccia (DH)	10-1	FC Aleria (7)
13.	Entente Corbara Santa Reparata (8)	1-4	CA Propriano (DH)
14.	FC Squadra Calvi (7)	1-0	FC Alta Rocca (9)

=== Franche-Comté ===
These matches were played on 12 and 13 September 2015.

Third round results: Franche-Comté

Tie no	Home team (tier)	Score	Away team (tier)
1.	US Pont De Roide Vermondans (DH)	1-0	SC Clemenceau Besançon (7)
2.	Bresse Jura Foot (DH)	2-0	CA de Pontarlier (CFA2)
3.	CS de Frasne (9)	2-4	US St Vit (DH)
4.	SC Villers Le Lac (9)	0-6	AS d'Orchamps Vennes (7)
5.	Triangle d'Or Jura Foot (7)	1-3	AS Levier (7)
6.	Thise Chalezeule FC (9)	1-2	Entente Sud Revermont Cousance St Amou (7)
7.	RC Lons Le Saunier (7)	3-2	FC de Mouchard Arc et Senans (8)
8.	AS d'Ornans (DH)	2-0	S Genereaux Hericourt (7)
9.	A des Amities Franco Turques (9)	4-3 (a.e.t.)	FC de l'Isle Sur Doubs (7)
10.	Promo S Besançon (DH)	1-0	FC Grandvillars (DH)
11.	AS Avoudrey (10)	0-6	FC Champagnole (DH)
12.	AS du Chateau de Joux (11)	0-2	Besançon FC (CFA2)
13.	US Avanne (10)	0-5	AS Jura Dolois F (7)
14.	FC de Montfaucon-Morre-Gennes (8)	4-1	FC Chatillon Devecey (8)
15.	US Arcey (10)	1-0	FC Giro Lepuix (8)
16.	RC Voujeaucourt (9)	2-0	FC Seloncourt (10)
17.	AS Bavilliers (8)	0-2	FC Bart (7)
18.	Entente S Pays Maichois (9)	0-3	Racing Besançon (CFA2)
19.	FC Noidanais (8)	1-2	AS Baume Les Dames (DH)
20.	Etoile S Exincourt Taillecourt (7)	0-1	FC Valdahon Vercel (8)
21.	FC Le Russey (10)	2-3	US de Sochaux (7)

=== Languedoc-Roussillon ===
These matches were played between 12 and 20 September 2015.

Third round results: Languedoc-Roussillon

Tie no	Home team (tier)	Score	Away team (tier)
1.	Avenir S Roussonais (8)	3-2	F Agglomeration Carcassonne (DH)
2.	ROC Social Sete (9)	1-2	A Espoir et Culture St Gilles (7)
3.	US Béziers (9)	5-0	FC St Nazairois (8)
4.	SC Anduzien (7)	4-2 (a.e.t.)	AS St Martin Montpeillier (8)
5.	ASPTT Montpellier (12)	0-3	AS Pignan (9)
6.	Etoile S Nezignanaise (11)	1-4	US Mauguio Carnon (8)
7.	Entente S Marguerittoise (9)	0-3	Canet Roussillon FC (DH)
8.	O de St Andre (7)	2-4	AS Fabreguoise (CFA2)
9.	AS Nîmes Athletic (9)	0-7	OC Perpignan (DH)
10.	Centre Educatif Palavas (7)	7-0	Baillargues St Bres Valergues (8)
11.	FC Val de Ceze (8)	0-4	Entente S Pays d'Uzes (8)
12.	AS Atlas Paillade (7)	1-4	O Ales en Cevennes (CFA2)
13.	OC Redessan (9)	1-0	Stade O Aimargues (7)
14.	Castelnau le Cres FC (7)	2-1	RCO Agathois (CFA2)
15.	SC Castanet Nîmes (10)	2-4	Trapel FC (8)
16.	FC de Villegly (10)	2-5	Marvejols S (7)
17.	Pointe Courte AC Sete (10)	2-1 (a.e.t.)	FC St Cyprien Latour (9)
18.	FC Pyramid Grande Motte Littoral (DH)	0-1	Avenir Foot Lozere (DH)
19.	Avenir S du Tarn et du Tarnon (10)	2-3	AS Prades F (9)
20.	La Clermontaise (7)	2-0	CO Castelnaudary (7)
21.	Trebes FC (7)	2-0	FC Stephanois (7)
22.	FC Corbieres Medierranee (7)	0-2	Stade Balarucois (7)
23.	Ille Sur Tet FC (9)	3-1	Elne FC (7)
24.	AS St Georges De Levejac (10)	0-4	FU Narbonne (DH)
25.	Entente Perrier Vergeze (7)	3-1	Meze Stade FC (8)
26.	ES Paulhan-Pézenas (CFA2)	1-1 (3-0 p)	AS Lattoise (DH)
27.	Salanca FC (8)	1-3	JS Chemin Bas d'Avignon (7)
28.	US Montagnacoise (9)	2-4	Gallia C Lunellois (7)
29.	FC Bagnols Pont (DH)	2-0	Point d'Interrogation Vendarguois (7)
30.	FC Briolet (8)	3-1	Etoile S Eulalie Villesque (9)
31.	US Salinieres Aigues Mortes (DH)	5-1	FC Petit Bard Montpellier (7)
32.	Stade St Barbe La Grand Combe (10)	0-6	Avenir S Frontignan AC (DH)
33.	Haut Minervois Olympique (8)	1-1 (4-5 p)	Cabestany OC (7)
34.	US du Minervois (8)	1-3	AS Montarnaud St Paul Vaihauques Murviel (9)
35.	AS St Paulet (9)	2-3 (a.e.t.)	Gallia C d'Uchaud (7)
36.	Arceaux Montpellier (8)	1-0	US Lunel Vielloise (9)
37.	Entente S des Communes Le Buisson (10)	2-4	US Conquoise (DH)

=== Lorraine ===
These matches were played on 12 and 13 September 2015.

Third round results: Lorraine

Tie no	Home team (tier)	Score	Away team (tier)
1.	FC Rohrbach-Bining (10)	0-7	Sarreguemines FC (CFA2)
2.	Cercle A Boulay (7)	1-0	US Forbach (CFA2)
3.	FC Neufchateau-Liffol (9)	0-8	US Raon L'Etape (CFA2)
4.	Equipe F Turque Sarrebourg (8)	4-2	AS Bettborn Hellering (9)
5.	FC Champigneulles (7)	0-1	FC Luneville (DH)
6.	Entente S Longuyonnaise (10)	1-3	FC Hettange Grande (7)
7.	US Bassin de Longwy (9)	1-1 (2-4 p)	FC de Yutz (7)
8.	US Boulange (10)	2-1 (a.e.t.)	FC Bure (10)
9.	FC du Bassin Piennois (7)	2-4 (a.e.t.)	AS Clouange (8)
10.	US Lexy (10)	0-2	Entente S Villerupt-Thille (7)
11.	RC Nilvange (12)	2-1	ASC Basse Ham (11)
12.	Cercle des S Homecourt (8)	2-4	Cercle S Veymerange (DH)
13.	Entente S de Joeuf (8)	3-3 (4-2 p)	CS Orne Amneville (DH)
14.	US Froidcul (8)	3-1	AS Portguais St Francois Thionville (8)
15.	Entente S Marange Silvange (9)	3-2	U Lorraine Rombas (7)
16.	US Avant Garde Uckange (8)	0-3	FC Tremery (DH)
17.	Entente S Renaissance Remeling (8)	5-1	FC Verny Louvigny Cuvry (10)
18.	US Ban St Martin (10)	5-1	FC de Noveant (9)
19.	AS Anzeling Edling (10)	1-0	FC Thionville (7)
20.	AS Talange (10)	2-1 (a.e.t.)	US Marspich (10)
21.	Amicale du Personnel Municipal Metz FC (DH)	5-2	Entente S Fameck (7)
22.	Entente S Woippy (9)	0-1	Renaissance S Amanvillers (7)
23.	Entente S Richemont (10)	1-3	AS Montigny Les Metz (8)
24.	Entente S Lixing Laning 95 (11)	1-3	Renaissance S Magny (DH)
25.	Entente S Gros Rederching Bettviller (10)	2-5	USF Farebersviller 05 (8)
26.	FC Folschviller (9)	2-1	Entente S Macheren (9)
27.	FC Bruch Forbach (11)	1-4	AS Morhange (8)
28.	US Behren Les Forbach (9)	4-4 (5-6 p)	US Morsbach (10)
29.	AS Rech Les Sarralbe (11)	1-6	Entente F Delme Solgne (9)
30.	FC Metzing (10)	1-6	Etoile Naborienne (DH)
31.	AS Ludres (8)	0-1	AS Pagny Sur Moselle (CFA2)
32.	Maxeville FC (9)	1-2	FC Pulnoy (8)
33.	Amicale des Cheminots Blainville-Damelevieres (8)	2-0	Groupe S Neuves Maisons (DH)
34.	St Max-Essey FC (9)	1-9	Jarville Jeunes Section F (DH)
35.	AS Laneuveville Bois-Marainville (10)	0-1	U Lorraine de Plantieres Metz (7)
36.	Entente S Bayon Roville (11)	0-4	Entente S Heillecourt (7)
37.	AS d'Ars Sur Moselle (10)	0-2	US Vandoeuvre (7)
38.	ASC Saulxures (10)	2-1	AS St Julien Les Meltz (9)
39.	US Thiervilloise (10)	2-1	AS Treveray (10)
40.	FC Tronville (9)	2-0	US Behonne Longeville en Barrois (10)
41.	Entente Vigneulle Hannonville Fresne (8)	2-1	AS de Villey St Etienne (9)
42.	US Etain-Buzy (10)	2-0	Section F Verdun Belleville (7)
43.	FC Toul (8)	2-2 (4-2 p)	Entente S Custines-Malleloy (7)
44.	FC St Mihiel (8)	1-0	Avenir S Varangeville St Nicolas (8)
45.	FC de Revigny (11)	0-16	Cercle S et O de Blenod et Pont-a-Mousson (DH)
46.	Bar Le Duc FC (DH)	1-0	Brillon AC (12)
47.	FC Remiremont (11)	1-2	AS Girancourt Dommartin Chaumou (8)
48.	Esperance Gerberviller (11)	0-2	AS Nomexy Vincey (7)
49.	US Lamarche (11)	2-6	Entente S Thaonnaise (CFA2)
50.	Groupe S Haroue Benney (8)	3-0	AS Gerardmer F (9)
51.	Entente S Aviere Darnieulles (10)	0-2	CS Thillotin (11)
52.	FC Eloyes (9)	3-2 (a.e.t.)	AS Vagney (7)
53.	ASC Kellermann (10)	6-0	AS St Nabord (11)
54.	AS Grains de Sable Nebing (10)	1-2	US Nousseviller (8)
55.	Societe Gymnastique Marienau (9)	0-2	Entente S Avricourt Moussey (10)
56.	FC Dieuze (10)	0-7	FC Sarrebourg (DH)
57.	FC Saulcy (11)	3-4 (a.e.t.)	US Arches Archettes Raon (9)
58.	FC Bitche (12)	1-3	S Reunis Creutzwald 03 (7)
59.	AS de Kerbach (11)	0-2	AS Montbronn (8)
60.	Achen Etting Schmittviller 2008 (10)	1-3	Stade O Merlebach (8)
61.	FC Hommert (11)	1-4	AS Reding (9)
62.	Entente S Golbey (8)	0-1	S Reunis Deodatiens (DH)

=== Maine ===
These matches were played on 13 September 2015.

Third round results: Maine

Tie no	Home team (tier)	Score	Away team (tier)
1.	US Sille Le Guillaume (10)	0-0 (4-2 p)	AS Garronnaise (8)
2.	Entente S Bonchamp Les Laval (DH)	2-1	JS Coulaines (DH)
3.	US Aronnaise (7)	1-1 (4-5 p)	CO St Saturnin Arche (DH)
4.	L'Erneenne (8)	1-2	US Changeenne (CFA2)
5.	Amicale S Andouille (8)	0-1	CS Sablons Gazonfier (9)
6.	US Cigne (10)	1-6	US St Berthevin les Laval (7)
7.	US Roeze (9)	2-0	US Arnage Pontlieue (7)
8.	AS Contest St Baudelle (10)	1-4	La Suze FC (DH)
9.	US St Mars La Briere (8)	0-6	US Nautique Spay (7)
10.	Etoile de la Germiniere (9)	1-0	Louverne S (DH)
11.	Amicale S La Chapelle St Aubin (8)	4-1	AS St Pavace (8)
12.	Francs Archers de la Bonne Lorraine (9)	0-4	SA Mamertins (7)
13.	US Tennie St Symphorien (10)	0-14	Le Mans FC (CFA2)
14.	CS Change (8)	2-4	AS du Bourny (DH)
15.	ES Connerre (DH)	2-0	AS Le Mans Villaret (7)
16.	C Omnisport Castelorien (10)	2-2 (2-4 p)	Velo S Fertois (DH)
17.	AS Juigne Sur Sarthe (11)	5-0	Amicale Le Bourgneuf La Foret (10)
18.	US Dyonisienne (10)	2-3	Entente S Monceenne (DH)
19.	Ancienne Chateau Gontier (9)	1-3	Patriote Brulonnaise (7)
20.	Stade O du Maine (8)	0-1	AS Mulsanne - Teloche (DH)
21.	Hermine St Ouennaise (8)	0-3	US Guecelard (DH)
22.	CA Evronnais (9)	2-7	RC Flechois (DH)
23.	AS Meslay Du Maine (8)	0-3	Sable Sur Sarthe FC (CFA2)
24.	Jeanne d'Arc Soulge Sur Ouette (11)	2-0	Entente S Craonnaise (7)

=== Méditerranée ===
These matches were played on 12 and 13 September 2015.

Third round results: Méditerranée

Tie no	Home team (tier)	Score	Away team (tier)
1.	FC de Sisteron (7)	0-1	Aubagne FC (CFA2)
2.	O St Maximois (8)	2-3	Gardia C (7)
3.	AS de l'Etoile du Sud (9)	0-0 (0-3 p)	Stade Marseillais Universite C (7)
4.	FC Septemes (10)	4-2	US Eygalieres (9)
5.	O Novais (8)	3-0	JS St Julien (9)
6.	AS St Remoise (7)	1-0	FC Luberon (10)
7.	FA Val Durance (8)	1-2	US Marseille Endoume Catalans (DH)
8.	Alliance S Valensole Greoux (9)	1-5	Esperance Pernoise (DH)
9.	O Montelais (8)	2-1	Etoile S Fosseenne (DH)
10.	Entente St Jean du Gres (10)	0-2	AC Port de Bouc (9)
11.	AS Bouc Bel Air (10)	1-3	Entente Union Generale Armenienne AS Ardziv Marseille (DH)
12.	Gap Foot 05 (7)	6-2	AC Arles-Avignon (CFA)
13.	Boxeland C Islois (9)	8-2	ASC de Jeunesse Felix Pyat (9)
14.	US Entraiguoise (9)	1-3	Avenir S Gardannais (7)
15.	Stade Maillanais (8)	0-0 (1-3 p)	FC Istres Ouest Provence (7)
16.	FA Chateaurenard (8)	0-2	Etoile S Boulbon (8)
17.	Etoile S Pennoise (DH)	1-0	SC Mouans Sartoux (7)
18.	FC Villefranchois (10)	1-2	AS Maximoise (7)
19.	AS de l'Esterel (9)	2-1 (a.e.t.)	RC Grasse (DH)
20.	Stade O Londais (8)	3-0 (a.e.t.)	Sporting Toulon Var (CFA2)
21.	Bormes Mimosas S (8)	3-1	Six Fours le Brusc FC (7)
22.	FC d'Antibes Juan les Pins (8)	2-2 (3-2 p)	US Carqueiranne la Crau (DH)
23.	FC de l'Etoile et de l'Huveaune (8)	3-2	Montet Bornala C Nice (10)
24.	St Paul La Colle Omnisport C (10)	1-7	JS St Jean Beaulieu (7)
25.	US Cap d'Ail (8)	0-3	AS Gemenosienne (DH)
26.	FC de Carros (8)	1-3	AS Roquebrune Cap Martin (9)
27.	Trinite SFC (8)	0-3	Entente S du Cannet Rocheville (CFA2)
28.	AS Cannes (DH)	0-4	Rapid Omnisports de Menton (7)
29.	Esperance Sorguaise (9)	1-3	Berre SC (7)
30.	SO Cassis (10)	1-2	Etoile S de la Ciotat (8)
31.	US Pegomas (8)	3-0	FSC La Ciotat (9)

== Intermediate play-off round ==
=== Alsace ===
This match played 23 September.

Intermediate play-off round Result: Alsace

Tie no	Home team (tier)	Score	Away team (tier)
1.	AS Strasbourg (9)	2-0	CERC S Fegersheim (9)

== Fourth round ==
=== Mayotte ===
Four matches were played on 16 June 2015 and one match played on 17 September 2015.

Fourth round results: Mayotte

Tie no	Home team (tier)	Score	Away team (tier)
1.	(Mayotte) AS Jumeaux de M'zouazia	2–1	Tchanga SC (Mayotte)
2.	(Mayotte) AS Racine du nord	2–1	AS Rosador (Mayotte)
3.	(Mayotte) AJ Kani-kéli	2–1	ASC Abeilles M'tsamboro (Mayotte)
4.	(Mayotte) FC Mtsapéré	1–0	UCS Sada (Mayotte)

=== Guadeloupe ===
These matches were played on 10 October 2015.

Fourth round results: Guadelope

Tie no	Home team (tier)	Score	Away team (tier)
1.	(Guadeloupe) E. de Morne à L'Eau	0–0 (5–3 p)	ASC Red Star de Point (Guadeloupe)
2.	(Guadeloupe) US Baie Mahaultienne	3–1	AC de Marie Galante (Guadeloupe)
3.	(Guadeloupe) CS Le Moule	2–0	US Sainte Rose (Guadeloupe)
4.	(Guadeloupe) Gauloise de Basse Terre	1–0	ASC Juventus Sainte Anne (Guadeloupe)

=== Réunion ===
These matches were played on 22 and 23 August 2015.

Fourth round results: Réunion

Tie no	Home team (tier)	Score	Away team (tier)
1.	(Réunion) SS Jeanne d'Arc	1–0	Saint-Denis FC (Réunion)
2.	(Réunion) S.D.E.F.A.	0–2	SS Capricorne (Réunion)
3.	(Réunion) JS Saint-Pierroise	1–0	OCSA Léopards (Réunion)
4.	(Réunion) SS Saint-Louisienne	5–1	Trois-Bassins FC (Réunion)
5.	(Réunion) AS Excelsior	6–0	AJS Ouest (Réunion)
6.	(Réunion) Saint-Pauloise FC	5–0	AS MJC Ste-Suzanne (Réunion)
7.	(Réunion) US Sainte-Marienne	2–0	AJ Petite-Île (Réunion)
8.	(Réunion) AS Marsouins	3–0	US Bénédictine (Réunion)

=== Alsace ===
These matches were played 26 and 27 September 2015.

Fourth round results: Alsace

Tie no	Home team (tier)	Score	Away team (tier)
1.	AS Illzach Modenheim (CFA2)	0-1	FC Hegenheim (DH)
2.	FC Dahlenheim (11)	0-4	SC Dinsheim (DH)
3.	AGIIR Florival (8)	3-0	FC Sierentz (7)
4.	AS Berrwiller Hartmannswiller (7)	1-2	ASC Biesheim (CFA2)
5.	FC Burnhaupt le Haut (7)	0-0 (5-4 p)	AS Blotzheim (8)
6.	FC Feldkirch (11)	1-9	FC Illhaeusern (7)
7.	FC Hirtzbach (DH)	1-2	Racing HW 96 (7)
8.	FC Horbourg Wihr (9)	0-5	FC Saint-Louis Neuweg (CFA)
9.	FC Kembs Reunis (7)	1-1 (2-3 p)	SC Cernay (8)
10.	AS Mertzen (9)	3-3 (2-4 p)	FC Ostheim (9)
11.	Real Mulhouse CF (8)	1-4	FC Mulhouse (CFA)
12.	FC Village Neuf (12)	1-3	FC Hagenthal 1959 (7)
13.	FC Uffheim (8)	4-0	FC Merxheim (9)
14.	FC Dambach Neunhoffen (12)	0-4	AS Gambsheim (9)
15.	FC Geispolheim 01 (DH)	1-2	US Sarre-Union (CFA)
16.	AS Ingwiller (9)	1-2	AS Elsau Portugais Strasbourg (7)
17.	FC Kronenbourg Strasbourg (7)	5-1	FA Illkirch Graffenstaden (DH)
18.	AS Lauterbourg (10)	0-6	AS Erstein (DH)
19.	FC Matzenheim (12)	1-4	FC Obermodern (8)
20.	AS Ohlungen (8)	1-1 (3-4 p)	AS Pierots Vauban Strasbourg (DH)
21.	ASC Portugais Val de la Bruche (12)	0-9	SC Schiltigheim (CFA2)
22.	ASL Robertsau (7)	4-0	FC Eckbolsheim (8)
23.	FCE Schirrhein (7)	3-0	AS Betschdorf 1935 (8)
24.	FC St Etienne Seltz (8)	1-1 (4-5 p)	FC Soleil Bischheim (DH)
25.	AS Menora Strasbourg (9)	5-1	FC Soultz ss/Forets (8)
26.	US Turcs Bischwiller (8)	0-3 (a.e.t.)	S Reunis Hoenheim (9)
27.	S Reunis Dorlisheim (11)	2-1	AS Wingen S/Moder (10)
28.	AS Hochfelden (9)	1-2	SC Ebersheim (9)
29.	AS Kilstett (9)	1-4	STE S Weyersheim (7)
30.	AS Wahlenheim Bernolsheim (12)	0-10	FCSR Haguenau (CFA2)
31.	FC Grussenheim (11)	0-3	FC Bennwihr (8)
32.	AS Ernolsheim S/Bruche (7)	4-1	LA S Molsheim (7)
33.	CS Mars 05 Bischheim (8)	1-0	AS Strasbourg (9)
34.	FC des S Reunis Obernai (DH)	1-0 (a.e.t.)	FC Saverne (7)

=== Aquitaine ===
These matches were played between 25 and 27 September 2015.

Fourth round results: Aquitaine

Tie no	Home team (tier)	Score	Away team (tier)
1.	Seignosse Capbreton Soustons FC (8)	0-7	Les Genêts d'Anglet Football (CFA2)
2.	Sp A Merignacais (DH)	0-5	Pau FC (CFA)
3.	US Castetis Gouze (11)	1-1 (3-1 p)	Stade St Medardais (7)
4.	FC du Grand Saint Emilionnais (7)	1-2 (a.e.t.)	Aviron Bayonnais (CFA)
5.	Prigonrieux FC (8)	0-3 w/o	Stade Montois (CFA)
6.	FC Bassin d'Arcachon (DH)	3-1	FC Estuaire Haute Gironde (7)
7.	Elan Boucalais (8)	0-1	US Lege Cap Ferret (CFA2)
8.	Entente Haute Bearn (12)	0-5	FC de St Medard en Jalles (DH)
9.	Union St Bruno FC SAB (9)	0-4	Langon FC (DH)
10.	ES d'Audenge (9)	0-5	Stade Bordelais ASPTT (CFA)
11.	AS Mazeres Uzos Rontignon (9)	0-1	Hiriburuko Ainhara St Pierre Irube (7)
12.	US St Michel Arudy (10)	2-3	Etoile S Eysinaise (7)
13.	FC Medoc Ocean (9)	0-0 (2-4 p)	St Paul S (8)
14.	AS St Aubin de Medoc (10)	0-2	SA G Cestas (DH)
15.	Izon Vayres FC (8)	3-0	Arin Luzien (7)
16.	FC Arsac Lepian Medoc (9)	2-1 (a.e.t.)	La Jeanne d'Arc de Biarritz (DH)
17.	FC Marmande 47 (CFA2)	0-2	Bergerac Périgord FC (CFA)
18.	Amicale S Gensac Montcaret (9)	0-2	La Jeanne d'Arc de Bearn Pau (9)
19.	US Alliance Talencaise (8)	2-1	FC Thenon Limeyrat Fossemagne (8)
20.	Amicale Laique et Bourg Sports (9)	2-0	SU Agenais (7)
21.	US Lormont (DH)	2-3	Trélissac FC (CFA)
22.	US Mussidan St Medard (9)	3-1	FC des Portes de l'Entre Deux Mers (7)
23.	ASSA Pays du Dropt (9)	1-4	FC Libourne (DH)
24.	La Joyeuse St Sulpice et Cameyra (10)	3-2	Jeunesse Villenavaise (CFA2)

=== Atlantique ===
These matches were played 26 and 27 September 2015.

Fourth round results: Atlantique

Tie no	Home team (tier)	Score	Away team (tier)
1.	Etoile S La Copechagniere (12)	1-4	St Nazaire Atlantique Football (DH)
2.	Etoile S Ornaysienne F Vendee La Roche Sur Yon (7)	1-3 (a.e.t.)	Vendee Poire Sur Vie Football (CFA2)
3.	Pouzauges Reaumir AC (7)	1-2 (a.e.t.)	Vendee Fontenay Foot (CFA)
4.	St Marc F (11)	3-4	La Malouine St Malo de Guersac (8)
5.	Tigres Vendee Etoile Chaumoise 85 Les Sables-D'Olonne (DH)	1-0	AC Chapelain Chappelle Sur Erdre (DH)
6.	La Fraternelle Mortagne Sur Sevre (11)	0-5	US Ste Luce Sur Loire (8)
7.	Chatelais FC (10)	2-2 (4-3 p)	Vaillante S Angers (7)
8.	Etoile de Clisson (9)	0-3	US Ste Anne de Vertou (CFA2)
9.	Elan de Gorges (9)	0-1	US Beaufort En Valle (8)
10.	RC Ancenis 44 (8)	2-2 (5-6 p)	US Autonome Pouance (8)
11.	Orvault Sports Football (DH)	3-2 (a.e.t.)	La Roche Vendee Football (CFA2)
12.	FC Pellouailles Corze (9)	0-2	FC Robretieres La Roche Sur Yon (7)
13.	AS Seiches Sur Le Loir Marce (9)	1-0	Les Marsouins Bretignollais F (8)
14.	Fuilet Chaussaire FC (11)	0-0 (4-5 p)	La Vigilante de St Fulgent (9)
15.	Amicale Dolaysienne (11)	1-2 (a.e.t.)	FC Montaigu (7)
16.	Union Fraternelle St Herblain (7)	1-3	Olympique Saumur FC (DH)
17.	Nort AC (8)	0-3	Voltigeurs de Chateaubriant (CFA)
18.	US Loire et Divatte (8)	0-2	FC Challans (CFA2)
19.	Flocelliere Chamon Sevre (8)	1-2	SC Beaucouzé (DH)
20.	FC des Achards (9)	2-1	Esp S de Bouchemaine (7)
21.	Entente S Cote de Lumiere La Tranche Angles (8)	3-0	St Aubin Guerande (7)
22.	Les Ecureuils des Pays de Monts (9)	1-6	SO Choletais (CFA)
23.	AS Sautronnaise (8)	0-1	FC de La Chappelle Des Marais (DH)
24.	Entente S L'Aubance Brissac Quince (11)	0-4	FC Reze (DH)
25.	AS St Hilaire Vihiers St Paul (9)	0-1	JSC Bellevue Nantes (8)
26.	SS Antigny St Maurice de Noues (11)	2-8	Mareuil SC (8)
27.	AS Bayard Saumur St Hilaire St Florent (8)	1-0 (a.e.t.)	FC Bouaye (9)
28.	Intrepide Angers F (8)	2-4	FC Essartais (7)
29.	Stade Olonne Sur Mer (9)	1-1 (2-4 p)	ASPTT - CAEB Cholet (10)
30.	Entente S Segre (DH)	2-1	Foyer Esperance de Trelaze (7)

=== Auvergne ===
These matches were played 26 and 27 September 2015.

Fourth round results: Auvergne

Tie no	Home team (tier)	Score	Away team (tier)
1.	Esp Ceyratoise (8)	0-2	AS Yzeure 03 Auvergne (CFA)
2.	A Vergongheon - Arvant (7)	1-5	AS Moulinoise (CFA)
3.	AS Chadrac (7)	2-0	US Crandelloise (8)
4.	US Murataise (7)	1-3	Ytrac Foot (DH)
5.	AS Cheminots Langeac (9)	1-5	FC Aurillac Arpajon Cantal Auvergne (CFA2)
6.	A Amicale Lapalissoise (7)	2-2 (3-2 p)	AS Domeratoise (DH)
7.	Sud Cantal Foot (9)	0-2	FC Espaly (7)
8.	US Beaumontoise (8)	1-0	Montlucon Football (DH)
9.	RC de Vichy (DH)	1-0 (a.e.t.)	FC Massiac Molompize Blesle (7)
10.	Cercle S Arpajonnais (8)	0-5	US Sanfloraine (DH)
11.	US St Beauzire (8)	4-2	US de Doyet (9)
12.	SC Amicale Cussetois (8)	0-3	CS de Volvic (DH)
13.	AS Mercy-Chapeau (10)	0-2	FC Lezoux (8)
14.	AS Dompierroise (8)	0-3	SA Thiernois (CFA2)
15.	US Vic Le Comte (8)	3-2	JS St Priest des Champs (8)
16.	SC St Pourcinois (8)	1-4	FC Cournon d'Auvergne (CFA2)
17.	Stade St Yorrais (8)	1-3	US Ennezat (9)
18.	Aulnat Sp (9)	2-6	US St Georges les Ancizes (DH)
19.	US Blavozy (7)	1-4	Le Puy Football 43 Auvergne (CFA)
20.	La Combelle Charbonnier A Breui (8)	1-0	AS Polignac (DH)

=== Lower Normandy ===
These matches were played on 26 and 27 September 2015.

Fourth round results: Mayotte

Tie no	Home team (tier)	Score	Away team (tier)
1.	FC St Lo Manche (CFA2)	5-0	Reveil St Germain Courseulles (DH)
2.	US Granvillaise (CFA2)	3-1 (a.e.t.)	AF Virois (6)
3.	FC Flerien (DH)	3-2	Maladrerie OS (DH)
4.	SU Divaise (DH)	3-1	US Alenconnaise 61 (DH)
5.	CA Lisieux F Pays d'Auge (8)	3-3 (1-4 p)	FC Argentan (7)
6.	CS Villedieu (8)	2-2 (3-5 p)	A Les Leopards de St Georges (8)
7.	Etoile S Pointe de la Hague (7)	3-2	Bayeux FC (DH)
8.	US Semilly St Andre (9)	0-1	AS de Cherbourg F (DH)
9.	Cambes En Plaine Sp (8)	0-1 (a.e.t.)	FC Equeurdreville Hainneville (7)
10.	LC Bretteville Sur Odon (8)	2-5	SC Herouvillais (DH)
11.	US St Pairaise (8)	0-1	Agneaux FC (7)
12.	US D'Andaine (9)	1-2	FC Agon Coutainville (7)
13.	AS Potigny-Villers Canivet-Ussy (9)	0-2	ASPTT Caen (CFA2)
14.	Bourguebus Soliers FC (8)	1-3	AS Trouville Deauville (DH)
15.	US Houlgate (9)	0-4	US Ouviere Normande Mondeville (DH)

=== Bourgogne ===
These matches were played on 26 and 27 September 2015.

Fourth round results: Bourgogne

Tie no	Home team (tier)	Score	Away team (tier)
1.	Reveil Is Sur Tille (7)	0-2	UF Maconnais (DH)
2.	Stade Auxerrois (7)	0-2	SC Selongeen (CFA2)
3.	FC Saulon Corcelles (10)	0-5	AS Genlis (8)
4.	AS Clamecycoise (7)	2-3	FC Sens (CFA2)
5.	US Semur En Auxois Epoisses (8)	1-2	Chevigny St Sauveur F (7)
6.	CO Avallonnais (DH)	2-1	US Charitoise (7)
7.	Entente Fauverney Rouvres Bretenier (8)	3-2 (a.e.t.)	Cercle S Laique Chenove (9)
8.	Paron FC (DH)	2-0	AS Garchizy (7)
9.	US de Varennes (8)	0-0 (5-4 p)	RC Nevers-Challuy Sermoise (8)
10.	FC Chassagne Montrachet (10)	1-0	AS La Chappelle De Guinchay (7)
11.	FC Abergement de Cuisery (9)	1-0	US St Serninoise (7)
12.	US Blanzynoise F (9)	0-4	FC Montceau Bourgogne (CFA)
13.	Montbard Venarey F (8)	1-5	A Loisirs Culture Longvic (7)
14.	A Chalonnaise F (8)	3-7	J Ouvriere du Creusot (8)
15.	AS Chatenoy Le Royal (7)	0-3	FC Gueugnonnais (CFA2)
16.	Louhans Cuiseaux FC (DH)	4-0	US Cheminot de Paray F (DH)

=== Centre-Val de Loire ===
These matches were played on 26 and 27 September 2015.

Fourth round results: Centre-Val de Loire

Tie no	Home team (tier)	Score	Away team (tier)
1.	FC St George Sur Eure (7)	1-2	US Municipale Saran (DH)
2.	FC de l'Ouest Tourangeau 37 (7)	0-2	Bourges 18 (CFA2)
3.	FC Richelieu (8)	0-3	Sologne Olympique Romorantin (CFA)
4.	CS Mainvilliers F (7)	1-0	Vierzon FC (DH)
5.	US Chitenay Cellettes (9)	1-4	St Pryve St Hilaire FC (CFA2)
6.	US Vendome (8)	0-1	Blois F 41 (DH)
7.	ASC des Portugais Blois (9)	0-3	FC Chartres (CFA2)
8.	Joue Les Tours FC Touraine (8)	2-5 (a.e.t.)	Bourges Foot (DH)
9.	CS Municipal Sully Sur Loire (8)	5-2	US St Maur (8)
10.	SC Azay Le Rideau - Cheille (8)	3-2	US Municipale Montgaris F (DH)
11.	CA Pithiviers (7)	1-0	US Chateauneuf Sur Loire (7)
12.	Avenir S Chateauneuf En Thymerais (8)	0-3	FC Drouais Dreux (CFA2)
13.	Entente AS Orval (8)	1-0	Avoine O Chinon Cinais (CFA2)
14.	US La Chatre (8)	0-1	FC St Doulchard (8)

=== Centre-West ===
These matches were played on 26 and 27 September 2015.

Fourth round results: Centre-West

Tie no	Home team (tier)	Score	Away team (tier)
1.	CS Beauvoir Sur Niort (11)	1-8	SO Chatellerault (CFA2)
2.	FC Nord 17 (9)	5-4 (a.e.t.)	US Marennaise (9)
3.	Tulle F Correze (7)	0-1	US Chauvigny (DH)
4.	Thouars Foot 79 (DH)	0-2	FC Chauray (DH)
5.	US Anais (12)	1-0	La Roche-Rivieres FC Tardoire (10)
6.	U Amicale Cognac F (DH)	2-3	Avenir S de Gouzon (7)
7.	Royan Vaux Atlantique FC (DH)	2-1	FC Bressuire (CFA2)
8.	ES Ardin (11)	0-3 (a.e.t.)	US St Sauveur (7)
9.	Antran S Loisirs (9)	3-1	Cap Aunis ASPTT FC (8)
10.	U Etoile S Montmorillon (DH)	0-2	Angoulême Charente FC (CFA2)
11.	CA Neuville (7)	0-1	La Rochelle Villeneuve FC (8)
12.	CA St Savin St Germain (8)	3-1	Entente S des Trois Cites Poitiers (8)
13.	US Bessines-Mortrerolles (8)	1-2	Poitiers FC (DH)
14.	Limoges FC (CFA2)	3-0	CS Feytiat (DH)
15.	Amicale S Puymoyen (10)	0-3	OFC de Ruelle (8)
16.	A des Anciens de l'Avenir Maritime Laleu La Pallice (10)	1-2	US Combranssiere (8)
17.	St Palais S (8)	1-3	Amicale S Cozes (DH)
18.	Entente S Ussel (11)	0-2	CA Rilhac Rancon (7)
19.	Entente S Beaulieu - Breuil (11)	1-4	Entente S La Rochelle (DH)
20.	UA Niort St Florent (9)	3-2	Esperance Terves ES (8)
21.	OL St Liguaire Niort (DH)	4-2 (a.e.t.)	Amicale S Soyaux (7)
22.	Entente S Beaumont St Cyr (9)	2-0	AS Beynat (10)
23.	AS Panazol (10)	1-1 (3-0 p)	AS Jugeals Noailles (8)
24.	SC Verneuil Sur Vienne (9)	1-2	Entente S Gueretoise (7)

=== Corsica ===
These matches were played on 26 and 27 September 2015.

Fourth round results: Corsica

Tie no	Home team (tier)	Score	Away team (tier)
1.	F Balagne Ile Rousse (CFA2)	3-0	AS Furiani Agliani (DH)
2.	CA Propriano (DH)	3-2	Espoir C Bastais (7)
3.	Gallia C de Lucciana (DH)	3-1	FC Bastelicaccia (DH)
4.	Etoile Filante Bastiase (DH)	2-0	US Ghisonaccia (7)
5.	FC Ajaccio (8)	0-2	Borgo FC (CFA2)
6.	US des Clubs du Cortenais (DH)	1-1 (3-1 p)	FC Squadra Calvi (7)
7.	SC Bocognano Gravona (DH)	2-0 (a.e.t.)	AJ Biguglia (DH)

=== Franche-Comté ===
These matches were played on 26 and 27 September 2015.

Fourth round results: Franche-Comté

Tie no	Home team (tier)	Score	Away team (tier)
1.	Besançon FC (CFA2)	4-1	AS Baume Les Dames (DH)
2.	A des Amities Franco Turques (9)	1-5	US Pont De Roide Vermondans (DH)
3.	AS d'Orchamps Vennes (7)	4-4 (2-4 p)	AS d'Ornans (DH)
4.	Entente Sud Revermont Cousance St Amou (7)	1-2 (a.e.t.)	AS Jura Dolois F (7)
5.	RC Lons Le Saunier (7)	0-1	Promo S Besançon (DH)
6.	FC Bart (7)	1-4	AS Levier (7)
7.	US St Vit (DH)	0-0 (2-4 p)	Jura Sud Foot (CFA)
8.	US Arcey (10)	1-4	US de Sochaux (7)
9.	FC de Montfaucon-Morre-Gennes (8)	1-1 (3-4 p)	Racing Besançon (CFA2)
10.	FC Valdahon Vercel (8)	1-2	Bresse Jura Foot (DH)
11.	RC Voujeaucourt (9)	1-3	FC Champagnole (DH)

=== Languedoc-Roussillon ===
These matches were played on 26 and 27 September 2015.

Fourth round results: Languedoc-Roussillon

Tie no	Home team (tier)	Score	Away team (tier)
1.	Avenir S Roussonais (8)	2-2 (6-5 p)	AS Fabreguoise (CFA2)
2.	US Conquoise (DH)	1-4	FC de Sete (CFA)
3.	OC Perpignan (DH)	3-1	FC Bagnols Pont (DH)
4.	Avenir Foot Lozere (DH)	7-1	A Espoir et Culture St Gilles (7)
5.	Trebes FC (7)	0-2	O Ales en Cevennes (CFA2)
6.	SC Anduzien (7)	3-2	ES Paulhan-Pézenas (CFA2)
7.	AS Pignan (9)	2-3	Gallia C d'Uchaud (7)
8.	Cabestany OC (7)	2-7	La Clermontaise (7)
9.	AS Prades F (9)	2-5	Arceaux Montpellier (8)
10.	Ille Sur Tet FC (9)	2-1	Gallia C Lunellois (7)
11.	US Salinieres Aigues Mortes (DH)	4-1	Centre Educatif Palavas (7)
12.	Marvejols S (7)	2-1	Entente Perrier Vergeze (7)
13.	Pointe Courte AC Sete (10)	0-4	Canet Roussillon FC (DH)
14.	JS Chemin Bas d'Avignon (7)	3-2	Castelnau le Cres FC (7)
15.	AS Montarnaud St Paul Vaihauques Murviel (9)	1-4	Avenir S Frontignan AC (DH)
16.	FC Briolet (8)	1-3	FU Narbonne (DH)
17.	US Mauguio Carnon (8)	5-1 (a.e.t.)	OC Redessan (9)
18.	US Béziers (9)	1-3	Stade Balarucois (7)
19.	Entente S Pays d'Uzes (8)	4-1	Trapel FC (8)

=== Lorraine ===
These matches were played on 26 and 27 September 2015.

Fourth round results: Lorraine

Tie no	Home team (tier)	Score	Away team (tier)
1.	AS Reding (9)	2-2 (8-7 p)	Entente S Thaonnaise (CFA2)
2.	US Raon L'Etape (CFA2)	2-0	Bar Le Duc FC (DH)
3.	AS Montigny Les Metz (8)	1-3	AS Pagny Sur Moselle (CFA2)
4.	Entente S Heillecourt (7)	0-2	AS Morhange (8)
5.	RC Nilvange (12)	0-4	Entente S Marange Silvange (9)
6.	Entente S de Joeuf (8)	2-0	Cercle S Veymerange (DH)
7.	US Thiervilloise (10)	4-3	FC Tremery (DH)
8.	US Boulange (10)	0-4	AS Clouange (8)
9.	US Etain-Buzy (10)	1-4	Renaissance S Magny (DH)
10.	US Froidcul (8)	2-3	FC Hettange Grande (7)
11.	Entente S Villerupt-Thille (7)	3-0	FC de Yutz (7)
12.	FC Folschviller (9)	2-1 (a.e.t.)	AS Anzeling Edling (10)
13.	USF Farebersviller 05 (8)	1-2	Sarreguemines FC (CFA2)
14.	AS Montbronn (8)	0-4	Amicale du Personnel Municipal Metz FC (DH)
15.	AS Talange (10)	1-1 (4-2 p)	Cercle A Boulay (7)
16.	Entente S Renaissance Remeling (8)	0-6	Etoile Naborienne (DH)
17.	US Morsbach (10)	0-6	Renaissance S Amanvillers (7)
18.	FC Sarrebourg (DH)	4-1	S Reunis Creutzwald 03 (7)
19.	US Nousseviller (8)	0-0 (4-3 p)	Stade O Merlebach (8)
20.	Entente Vigneulle Hannonville Fresne (8)	0-2	Jarville Jeunes Section F (DH)
21.	U Lorraine de Plantieres Metz (7)	2-3 (a.e.t.)	FC Toul (8)
22.	FC Tronville (9)	1-2	ASC Saulxures (10)
23.	Entente F Delme Solgne (9)	1-5	Cercle S et O de Blenod et Pont-a-Mousson (DH)
24.	US Ban St Martin (10)	1-0	FC St Mihiel (8)
25.	Groupe S Haroue Benney (8)	0-0 (4-1 p)	Amicale des Cheminots Blainville-Damelevieres (8)
26.	Entente S Avricourt Moussey (10)	0-2	S Reunis Deodatiens (DH)
27.	US Arches Archettes Raon (9)	1-3	FC Pulnoy (8)
28.	AS Girancourt Dommartin Chaumou (8)	0-1	FC Eloyes (9)
29.	US Vandoeuvre (7)	1-4	FC Luneville (DH)
30.	CS Thillotin (11)	1-3	ASC Kellermann (10)
31.	AS Nomexy Vincey (7)	0-1	Equipe F Turque Sarrebourg (8)

=== Maine ===
These matches were played on 26 and 27 September 2015.

Fourth round results: Maine

Tie no	Home team (tier)	Score	Away team (tier)
1.	US Sille Le Guillaume (10)	0-3	Le Mans FC (CFA2)
2.	Etoile de la Germiniere (9)	1-8	Patriote Brulonnaise (7)
3.	CO St Saturnin Arche (DH)	3-2	ES Connerre (DH)
4.	Velo S Fertois (DH)	3-0	Entente S Bonchamp Les Laval (DH)
5.	SA Mamertins (7)	1-2	Amicale S La Chapelle St Aubin (8)
6.	Jeanne d'Arc Soulge Sur Ouette (11)	1-5	US Changeenne (CFA2)
7.	RC Flechois (DH)	4-0	AS du Bourny (DH)
8.	US St Berthevin les Laval (7)	1-1 (7-6 p)	Sable Sur Sarthe FC (CFA2)
9.	AS Mulsanne - Teloche (DH)	1-3	US Guecelard (DH)
10.	CS Sablons Gazonfier (9)	1-3	La Suze FC (DH)
11.	AS Juigne Sur Sarthe (11)	1-0	US Nautique Spay (7)
12.	US Roeze (9)	1-0	Entente S Monceenne (DH)

=== Méditerranée ===
These matches were played on 27 September 2015.

Fourth round results: Méditerranée

Tie no	Home team (tier)	Score	Away team (tier)
1.	Berre SC (7)	2-0	O Montelais (8)
2.	FC Septemes (10)	0-4	FC Istres Ouest Provence (7)
3.	Esperance Pernoise (DH)	1-2	US Pontet F (CFA)
4.	Stade Marseillais Universite C (7)	0-1	Gap Foot 05 (7)
5.	Entente Union Generale Armenienne AS Ardziv Marseille (DH)	1-0	Avenir S Gardannais (7)
6.	Etoile S Boulbon (8)	2-2 (6-7 p)	O Novais (8)
7.	Boxeland C Islois (9)	0-6	US Marseille Endoume Catalans (DH)
8.	AC Port de Bouc (9)	0-3	US Marignanaise (CFA)
9.	AS St Remoise (7)	2-2 (3-5 p)	Aubagne FC (CFA2)
10.	Rapid Omnisports de Menton (7)	3-1	FC Martigues (CFA)
11.	Gardia C (7)	1-1 (2-4 p)	AS Gemenosienne (DH)
12.	Stade O Londais (8)	2-0	Etoile S Pennoise (DH)
13.	FC de l'Etoile et de l'Huveaune (8)	1-0	Bormes Mimosas S (8)
14.	AS Maximoise (7)	2-1	Etoile S de la Ciotat (8)
15.	AS de l'Esterel (9)	0-1	Entente S du Cannet Rocheville (CFA2)
16.	US Pegomas (8)	1-1 (5-4 p)	Hyeres FC (CFA)
17.	AS Roquebrune Cap Martin (9)	1-3	JS St Jean Beaulieu (7)
18.	FC d'Antibes Juan les Pins (8)	0-2	Toulon Le Las (CFA)

== Fifth round ==
=== Mayotte ===
These matches were played on 19 September 2015,

Fifth round results: Mayotte

Tie no	Home team (tier)	Score	Away team (tier)
1.	(Mayotte) AJ Kani-kéli	1–1 (6-5 p)	FC Mtsapéré (Mayotte)
2.	(Mayotte) AS Racine du nord	0–1	AS Jumeaux de M'zouazia (Mayotte)

=== Guadeloupe ===
The fifth round is the final round of qualifying in Guadeloupe. The winners of the two ties qualify for the seventh round.

These matches were played on 21 and 24 October 2015.

Fifth round results: Mayotte

Tie no	Home team (tier)	Score	Away team (tier)
1.	(Guadeloupe) CS Le Moule (DH)	2-1	La Gauloise de Basse Terre (DH) (Guadeloupe)
2.	(Guadeloupe) Etoile de Morne à L'Eau (DH)	2-1 (a.e.t.)	US Baie Mahault (DH) (Guadeloupe)

=== Réunion ===
These matches was played on 12 and 13 September 2015.

Fifth round results: Réunion

Tie no	Home team (tier)	Score	Away team (tier)
1.	(Réunion) SS Jeanne d'Arc	0–1	Saint-Pauloise FC (Réunion)
2.	(Réunion) JS Saint-Pierroise	2–0	AS Marsouins (Réunion)
3.	(Réunion) AS Excelsior	5–2 (a.e.t.)	SS Capricorne (Réunion)
4.	(Réunion) SS Saint-Louisienne	0–1	US Sainte-Marienne (Réunion)

=== Alsace ===
These matches were played 10 and 11 October 2015.

Fifth round results: Mayotte

Tie no	Home team (tier)	Score	Away team (tier)
1.	FCE Schirrhein (7)	2-2 (3-1 p)	CS Mars 05 Bischheim (8)
2.	FC Soleil Bischheim (DH)	2-1	AS Pierots Vauban Strasbourg (DH)
3.	S Reunis Dorlisheim (11)	1-4	FCSR Haguenau (CFA2)
4.	Racing HW 96 (7)	0-1 (a.e.t.)	RC Strasbourg Alsace (Nat)
5.	ASC Biesheim (CFA2)	0-2	FC Saint-Louis Neuweg (CFA)
6.	AGIIR Florival (8)	0-8	FC Mulhouse (CFA)
7.	SC Cernay (8)	1-2	AS Ernolsheim Sur Bruche (7)
8.	FC Bennwihr (8)	0-5	SC Dinsheim (DH)
9.	SC Ebersheim (9)	3-2	FC Burnhaupt le Haut (7)
10.	AS Gambsheim (9)	2-4	AS Erstein (DH)
11.	FC Hagenthal 1959 (7)	0-4	S Reunis Colmar (Nat)
12.	FC Hegenheim (DH)	2-0	AS Elsau Portugais Strasbourg (7)
13.	S Reunis Hoenheim (9)	4-0	FC Uffheim (8)
14.	FC Obermodern (8)	3-0	FC Ostheim (9)
15.	FC Kronenbourg Strasbourg (7)	6-2	FC des S Reunis Obernai (DH)
16.	AS Menora Strasbourg (9)	2-5	US Sarre-Union (CFA)
17.	FC Illhaeusern (7)	2-3	ASL Robertsau (7)
18.	Societe S Weyersheim (7)	0-1	SC Schiltigheim (CFA2)

=== Aquitaine ===
These matches were played on 9, 10 and 11 October 2015.

Fifth round results: Aquitaine

Tie no	Home team (tier)	Score	Away team (tier)
1.	Bergerac Périgord FC (CFA)	0-1	Pau FC (CFA)
2.	FC Libourne (DH)	2-2 (5-4 p)}	Aviron Bayonnais (CFA)
3.	Amicale Laique et Bourg Sports (9)	0-2	Les Genêts d'Anglet Football (CFA2)
4.	US Lege Cap Ferret (CFA2)	2-1	FC Bassin d'Arcachon (DH)
5.	US Castetis Gouze (11)	2-0	La Jeanne d'Arc de Bearn Pau (9)
6.	FC Arsac Lepian Medoc (9)	0-1	FC de St Medard en Jalles (DH)
7.	US Mussidan St Medard (9)	0-2	Langon FC (DH)
8.	Etoile S Eysinaise (7)	1-2	Hiriburuko Ainhara St Pierre Irube (7)
9.	US Alliance Talencaise (8)	0-1	Stade Bordelais ASPTT (CFA)
10.	Izon Vayres FC (8)	1-2	Trélissac FC (CFA)
11.	La Joyeuse St Sulpice et Cameyra (10)	0-4	St Paul S (8)
12.	SA G Cestas (DH)	0-1	Stade Montois (CFA)

=== Atlantique ===
These matches were played 10 and 11 October 2015.

Fifth round results: Atlantique

Tie no	Home team (tier)	Score	Away team (tier)
1.	FC Essartais (7)	1-6	Vendee Les Herbiers F (Nat)
2.	Olympique Saumur FC (DH)	3-1	FC Challans (CFA2)
3.	US Ste Anne de Vertou (CFA2)	3-1	Tigres Vendee Etoile Chaumoise 85 Les Sables-D'Olonne (DH)
4.	AS Bayard Saumur St Hilaire St Florent (8)	2-0	Entente S Cote de Lumiere La Tranche Angles (8)
5.	La Malouine St Malo de Guersac (8)	1-4 (a.e.t.)	SC Beaucouzé (DH)
6.	JSC Bellevue Nantes (8)	0-2	St Nazaire Atlantique Football (DH)
7.	ASPTT - CAEB Cholet (10)	3-2	AS Seiches Sur Le Loir Marce (9)
8.	FC Reze (DH)	2-0	Vendee Fontenay Foot (CFA)
9.	Vendee Poire Sur Vie Football (CFA2)	3-0	FC de La Chappelle Des Marais (DH)
10.	FC Robretieres La Roche Sur Yon (7)	0-2	SO Choletais (CFA)
11.	Mareuil SC (8)	1-2 (a.e.t.)	US Beaufort En Valle (8)
12.	US Autonome Pouance (8)	1-3 (a.e.t.)	Entente S Segre (DH)
13.	Chatelais FC (10)	0-1 (a.e.t.)	FC des Achards (9)
14.	FC Montaigu (7)	0-1 (a.e.t.)	Orvault Sports Football (DH)
15.	US Ste Luce Sur Loire (8)	0-6	Vendee Lucon F (Nat)
16.	La Vigilante de St Fulgent (9)	0-2 (a.e.t.)	Voltigeurs de Chateaubriant (CFA)

=== Auvergne ===
These matches were played 10 and 11 October 2015.

Fifth round results: Auvergne

Tie no	Home team (tier)	Score	Away team (tier)
1.	FC Cournon d'Auvergne (CFA2)	0-2	SA Thiernois (CFA2)
2.	FC Aurillac Arpajon Cantal Auvergne (CFA2)	2-4	AS Yzeure 03 Auvergne (CFA)
3.	CS de Volvic (DH)	0-0 (4-3 p)	RC de Vichy (DH)
4.	US Sanfloraine (DH)	1-0	Le Puy Football 43 Auvergne (CFA)
5.	US Beaumontoise (8)	1-2 (a.e.t.)	US St Georges les Ancizes (DH)
6.	US Ennezat (9)	1-8	AS Moulinoise (CFA)
7.	US St Beauzire (8)	2-1 (a.e.t.)	A Amicale Lapalissoise (7)
8.	FC Lezoux (8)	0-1	US Vic Le Comte (8)
9.	La Combelle Charbonnier A Breui (8)	0-2	Ytrac Foot (DH)
10.	FC Espaly (7)	4-1	AS Chadrac (7)

=== Lower Normandy ===
These matches were played on 10 and 11 October 2015.

Fifth round results: Lower Normandy

Tie no	Home team (tier)	Score	Away team (tier)
1.	AS Trouville Deauville (DH)	1-2	AS de Cherbourg F (DH)
2.	FC Flerien (DH)	1-5	SU Divaise (DH)
3.	US Ouviere Normande Mondeville (DH)	0-1 (a.e.t.)	US Granvillaise (CFA2)
4.	A Les Leopards de St Georges (8)	0-9	US d'Avranches Mont St Michel (Nat)
5.	FC Equeurdreville Hainneville (7)	4-1	Etoile S Pointe de la Hague (7)
6.	Agneaux FC (7)	1-2	FC St Lo Manche (CFA2)
7.	SC Herouvillais (DH)	3-0	ASPTT Caen (CFA2)
8.	FC Argentan (7)	2-2 (2-4 p)	FC Agon Coutainville (7)

=== Bourgogne ===
These matches were played on 10 and 11 October 2015.

Fifth round results: Bourgogne

Tie no	Home team (tier)	Score	Away team (tier)
1.	FC Abergement de Cuisery (9)	0-5	FC Montceau Bourgogne (CFA)
2.	SC Selongeen (CFA2)	2-0	CO Avallonnais (DH)
3.	J Ouvriere du Creusot (8)	2-4	Louhans Cuiseaux FC (DH)
4.	FC Chassagne Montrachet (10)	2-5	FC Sens (CFA2)
5.	US de Varennes (8)	0-4	UF Maconnais (DH)
6.	AS Genlis (8)	5-3	A Loisirs Culture Longvic (7)
7.	Entente Fauverney Rouvres Bretenier (8)	0-1	Paron FC (DH)
8.	Chevigny St Sauveur F (7)	0-2	FC Gueugnonnais (CFA2)

=== Brittany ===
These matches were played on 10 and 11 October 2015.

Fifth round results: Brittany

Tie no	Home team (tier)	Score	Away team (tier)
1.	Cléguerec FC (10)	0-3	GSI Pontivy (CFA2)
2.	Jeunesse Combourgeoise (7)	0-3	US Saint-Malo (CFA)
3.	Stade Plabennécois (CFA)	2-1	Lannion FC (CFA2)
4.	Vannes OC (DH)	2-1	FC Auray (7)
5.	Hermine Concarneau (11)	0-1	Pluvigner Kériolets (7)
6.	AS Saint-Martin-des-Champs (9)	3-1	MB Noyal-Pontivy (8)
7.	Plobannalec-Lesconil (7)	1-3 (a.e.t.)	FC Quimperlé (7)
8.	FC Paimpol (7)	2-1	Paotred Dispount Ergué-Gaberic (7)
9.	FC Bénodet Odet (9)	0-2	ES Saint-Thégonnec (8)
10.	Espérance Plouguerneau (9)	0-4	US Montagnarde (DH)
11.	ACF Plouzané (DH)	2-0	Stade Pontivyen (7)
12.	FC Pont-l'Abbé (8)	0-3	US Concarneau (CFA)
13.	FC Châteaulin (8)	0-1	FC Rostrenen (8)
14.	US Perros-Louanec (9)	0-1	FC Landerneau (8)
15.	Sp. Edern (11)	0-4	En Avant Saint-Renan (8)
16.	SP Domloup (9)	0-4	FC Guipry-Messac (7)
17.	OSC Loudéac (8)	0-0 (4-5 p)	US Châteaugiron (9)
18.	La Chapelle des Fougeretz/Montgermont (8)	2-1 (a.e.t.)	AS Vitré (CFA)
19.	Elven (8)	2-4	AS Retiers (8)
20.	FC Breteil/Talensac (9)	0-0 (5-3 p)	US Saint-Jouan-des-Guérêts (9)
21.	FC Ploufragan (7)	0-2	TA Rennes (CFA2)
22.	FC Noyal-Brécé (9)	4-0	US Gaël-Muel (10)
23.	Stade Briochin (CFA2)	3-1 (a.e.t.)	Saint-Colomban Sportive Locminé (DH)
24.	AS Moustior AC (11)	0-3	FC La Plancoëtine (9)
25.	CPB Bréquigny Rennes (DH)	4-3	RC Rannée-la-Guerche (DH)
26.	US Fremur Fresnaye Henanbihen (7)	0-2 (a.e.t.)	AGL Drapeau Fougères (CFA2)
27.	US La Gacilly (8)	2-1	AS Trélivan (9)
28.	OC Montauban-de-Bretagne (8)	0-2	US Liffré (9)

=== Centre-Val de Loire ===
These matches were played on 10 and 11 October 2015.

Fifth round results: Centre-Val de Loire

Tie no	Home team (tier)	Score	Away team (tier)
1.	Entente AS Orval (8)	0-3	La Berrichonne de Chateauroux (Nat)
2.	CS Municipal Sully Sur Loire (8)	0-4	US Orleans Loiret F (Nat)
3.	FC Drouais Dreux (CFA2)	0-4	FC Chartres (CFA2)
4.	SC Azay Le Rideau - Cheille (8)	0-2 (a.e.t.)	Bourges 18 (CFA2)
5.	Bourges Foot (DH)	0-0 (7-6 p)	St Pryve St Hilaire FC (CFA2)
6.	Blois F 41 (DH)	3-4 (a.e.t.)	Sologne Olympique Romorantin (CFA)
7.	FC St Doulchard (8)	1-1 (1-4 p)	CS Mainvilliers F (7)
8.	US Municipale Saran (DH)	1-0	CA Pithiviers (7)

=== Centre-West ===
These matches were played on 10 and 11 October 2015.

Fifth round results: Centre-West

Tie no	Home team (tier)	Score	Away team (tier)
1.	US Combranssiere (8)	2-3 (a.e.t.)	CA St Savin St Germain (8)
2.	OL St Liguaire Niort (DH)	0-1	Limoges FC (CFA2)
3.	Angoulême Charente FC (CFA2)	2-2 (5-4 p)	Poitiers FC (DH)
4.	Entente S Gueretoise (7)	2-1	Royan Vaux Atlantique FC (DH)
5.	CA Rilhac Rancon (7)	2-3	Entente S La Rochelle (DH)
6.	SO Chatellerault (CFA2)	3-4 (a.e.t.)	US Chauvigny (DH)
7.	US Anais (12)	1-9	FC Nord 17 (9)
8.	Antran S Loisirs (9)	0-1	Amicale S Cozes (DH)
9.	OFC de Ruelle (8)	3-6	FC Chauray (DH)
10.	La Rochelle Villeneuve FC (8)	4-1	UA Niort St Florent (9)
11.	Entente S Beaumont St Cyr (9)	0-0 (2-4 p)	US St Sauveur (7)
12.	AS Panazol (10)	1-1 (6-5 p)	Avenir S de Gouzon (7)

=== Corsica ===
These matches were played on 10 and 11 October 2015.

Fifth round results: Corsica

Tie no	Home team (tier)	Score	Away team (tier)
1.	Borgo FC (CFA2)	1-0 (a.e.t.)	Cercle A Bastia (Nat)
2.	Etoile Filante Bastiase (DH)	4-0	US des Clubs du Cortenais (DH)
3.	F Balagne Ile Rousse (CFA2)	2-1 (a.e.t.)	Gallia C de Lucciana (DH)
4.	CA Propriano (DH)	1-0 (a.e.t.)	SC Bocognano Gravona (DH)

=== Franche-Comté ===
These matches were played on 10 and 11 October 2015.

Fifth round results: Franche-Comté

Tie no	Home team (tier)	Score	Away team (tier)
1.	Racing Besançon (CFA2)	2-1 (a.e.t.)	AS d'Ornans (DH)
2.	FC Champagnole (DH)	0-3	Besançon FC (CFA2)
3.	AS Levier (7)	0-2	Jura Sud Foot (CFA)
4.	Promo S Besançon (DH)	1-2	AS Jura Dolois F (7)
5.	Bresse Jura Foot (DH)	6-1	US de Sochaux (7)
6.	US Pont De Roide Vermondans (DH)	2-1	ASM Belfortaine FC (Nat)

=== Languedoc-Roussillon ===
These matches were played on 10 and 11 October 2015.

Fifth round results: Languedoc-Roussillon

Tie no	Home team (tier)	Score	Away team (tier)
1.	Marvejols S (7)	1-2	Avenir S Béziers (Nat)
2.	FU Narbonne (DH)	1-0	La Clermontaise (7)
3.	Stade Balarucois (7)	3-0	Entente S Pays d'Uzes (8)
4.	O Ales en Cevennes (CFA2)	1-4	Avenir S Frontignan AC (DH)
5.	Arceaux Montpellier (8)	3-0	Ille Sur Tet FC (9)
6.	JS Chemin Bas d'Avignon (7)	0-1	FC de Sete (CFA)
7.	Canet Roussillon FC (DH)	1-0	Avenir Foot Lozere (DH)
8.	Gallia C d'Uchaud (7)	2-0	Avenir S Roussonais (8)
9.	SC Anduzien (7)	2-3	US Salinieres Aigues Mortes (DH)
10.	US Mauguio Carnon (8)	1-2	OC Perpignan (DH)

=== Lorraine ===
These matches were played on 10 and 11 October 2015.

Fifth round results: Lorraine

Tie no	Home team (tier)	Score	Away team (tier)
1.	US Raon L'Etape (CFA2)	2-0 (a.e.t.)	Stade A Epinal (Nat)
2.	US Ban St Martin (10)	2-4	Sarreguemines FC (CFA2)
3.	US Thiervilloise (10)	0-1	Renaissance S Magny (DH)
4.	FC Folschviller (9)	2-3	FC Hettange Grande (7)
5.	Entente S Marange Silvange (9)	4-1	AS Talange (10)
6.	AS Clouange (8)	3-1	US Nousseviller (8)
7.	AS Pagny Sur Moselle (CFA2)	4-2	Cercle S et O de Blenod et Pont-a-Mousson (DH)
8.	Entente S de Joeuf (8)	1-5	Amicale du Personnel Municipal Metz FC (DH)
9.	Groupe S Haroue Benney (8)	0-2	Jarville Jeunes Section F (DH)
10.	ASC Kellermann (10)	1-0	FC Sarrebourg (DH)
11.	AS Morhange (8)	0-4	FC Luneville (DH)
12.	Equipe F Turque Sarrebourg (8)	0-1	FC Pulnoy (8)
13.	ASC Saulxures (10)	1-1 (5-3 p)	FC Toul (8)
14.	Renaissance S Amanvillers (7)	0-3	S Reunis Deodatiens (DH)
15.	FC Eloyes (9)	0-2	AS Reding (9)
16.	Etoile Naborienne (DH)	2-0	Entente S Villerupt-Thille (7)

=== Maine ===
These matches were played on 11 October 2015.

Fifth round results: Maine

Tie no	Home team (tier)	Score	Away team (tier)
1.	Patriote Brulonnaise (7)	3-1	Velo S Fertois (DH)
2.	US Roeze (9)	2-3	Le Mans FC (CFA2)
3.	US Guecelard (DH)	1-4	CO St Saturnin Arche (DH)
4.	Amicale S La Chapelle St Aubin (8)	4-1	US St Berthevin les Laval (7)
5.	AS Juigne Sur Sarthe (11)	0-4	La Suze FC (DH)
6.	US Changeenne (CFA2)	2-0	RC Flechois (DH)

=== Méditerranée ===
These matches were played on 10 and 11 October 2015.

Fifth round results: Méditerranée

Tie no	Home team (tier)	Score	Away team (tier)
1.	Berre SC (7)	2-0	US Pontet F (CFA)
2.	Toulon Le Las (CFA)	1-5	US Marignanaise (CFA)
3.	Entente S du Cannet Rocheville (CFA2)	0-3	Aubagne FC (CFA2)
4.	Gap Foot 05 (7)	1-3 (a.e.t.)	FC Istres Ouest Provence (7)
5.	AS Gemenosienne (DH)	1-2	Etoile FC Frejus St Raphael (Nat)
6.	Rapid Omnisports de Menton (7)	0-2	AS Maximoise (7)
7.	Stade O Londais (8)	2-5	Groupe S Consolat (Nat)
8.	US Pegomas (8)	1-1 (4-2 p)	US Marseille Endoume Catalans (DH)
9.	Entente Union Generale Armenienne AS Ardziv Marseille (DH)	1-2	JS St Jean Beaulieu (7)
10.	O Novais (8)	0-2	FC de l'Etoile et de l'Huveaune (8)

=== Midi-Pyrénées ===
These matches were played on 10 and 11 October 2015.

Fifth round results: Midi-Pyrénées

Tie no	Home team (tier)	Score	Away team (tier)
1.	Pibrac (8)	0–2	Colomiers (4)
2.	Onet-le-Château (6)	0–1	Toulouse Saint-Jo (6)
3.	Blagnac (5)	2–1	Luc Primaube (6)
4.	Revel (6)	2–2 (2–4 p)	Foix (7)
5.	Montauban (7)	1–0	Toulouse Fontaines (7)
6.	Olympique Girou (6)	2–1 (a.e.t.)	Tarbes (4)
7.	Auch (6)	0–2	Toulouse Rodéo (6)
8.	Balma (5)	0–1	Luzenac (6)
9.	Toulouse ACF (8)	1–1 (2–3 p)	Muret (6)
10.	Seysses Frouzins (8)	0–4	Rodez (4)
11.	Mondonville (10)	2–4	Isle en Dodon (8)
12.	Cheminots Severacais (8)	2–1	Bas Rouergue (9)

=== Nord-Pas-de-Calais ===
These matches were played on 10 and 11 October 2015.

Fifth round results: Nord-Pas-de-Calais

Tie no	Home team (tier)	Score	Away team (tier)
1.	FC Servins Verdrel (9)	1–7	US Boulogne (3)
2.	FC Masny (11)	2–0	US Biache-Saint-Vaast (7)
3.	SC Hazebrouck (6)	3–1	Arras Football (4)
4.	SC Feignies (5)	0–1	USL Dunkerque (3)
5.	SC Douai (8)	1–1 (4–3 p)	Calais RUFC (4)
6.	Saint-Amand FC (6)	4–0	US Saint-Pol-sur-Ternoise (7)
7.	ES Lambres-lez-Douai (8)	0–1	US Saint-Omer (6)
8.	L'Éclair Neufchâtel (9)	0–0 (7–6 p)	US Blaringhem (10)
9.	AS de la Bourgogne-Tourcoing (11)	2–1	US Lille-Moulins Carrel (8)
10.	AC Mons-en-Barœul (8)	1–0	US Blériot Plage Calais (9)
11.	Dechy Sports (14)	1–0 (a.e.t.)	ESC Coulogne (9)
12.	JA Armentières (7)	1–1 (3–4 p)	AS Raismes Vicoigne (8)
13.	US Hordain (9)	0–2	Stade Béthunois (6)
14.	Omnisports Aire-sur-la-Lys (7)	0–3	Olympique Grande-Synthe (5)
15.	AS Beuvry-la-Forêt (9)	1–3	FC Seclin (7)
16.	US Wattrelos (10)	0–4	Iris Club Croix (4)
17.	ASG Louvroil (9)	3–5	Le Touquet AC (6)
18.	AS Hellemmes (9)	2–1 (a.e.t.)	EC Lievin (9)
19.	ES Beaurainville (11)	0–5	FA Neuville 96 (6)
20.	CS Avion (7)	1–3 (a.e.t.)	Olympique Lumbrois (8)
21.	Iris Club La Sentinelle (9)	0–4	US Vimy (7)
22.	CAS Escaudœuvres (8)	0–2	ES Wasquehal (4)
23.	Olympique Marcq-en-Barœul (7)	0–1	AS Marck (5)
24.	AS Dockers Dunkerque (11)	0–4	AS Étaples (7)
25.	AS Steenvoorde (11)	0–2	AS Berck (9)
26.	ES Villers-Outréaux (8)	1–4	US Maubeuge (6)

=== Champagne-Ardennes ===
These matches were played on 10 and 11 October 2015.

Fifth round results: Champagne-Ardennes

Tie no	Home team (tier)	Score	Away team (tier)
1.	SC Marnaval (7)	1–5	RC Épernay Champagne (5)
2.	Rethel SF (6)	0–2	AS Prix-lès-Mézières (6)
3.	FC Christo (9)	0–1	CA Villers-Semeuse (7)
4.	US Éclaron (6)	0–4	CS Sedan Ardennes (3)
5.	FC Nogent-sur-Seine (6)	0–0 (6–5 p)	Chalons FCO (7)
6.	Chaumont FC (6)	1–1 (1–4 p)	ÉF Reims Sainte-Anne Châtillons (6)
7.	FCA Troyes (6)	1–0	AS Cernay Berru Lavannes (7)
8.	Olympique Chapelain (9)	1–8	FC Saint-Mesmin (7)

== Sixth round ==
=== French Guiana ===
These matches were played 24 and 25 October 2015.

Tie no	Home team (tier)	Score	Away team (tier)
1.	(French Guiana) FC Oyapock (non)	0-1	Etoile Filante Iracoubo (DH) (French Guiana)
2.	(French Guiana) O de Cayenne (PH)	1-3 (a.e.t.)	ASC Agouado (DH) (French Guiana)

=== Martinique ===
These matches were played 23 and 24 October 2015.

Tie no	Home team (tier)	Score	Away team (tier)
1.	(Martinique) Golden Star (DH)	1-1 (4-3 p)	Club Colonial (DH) (Martinique)
2.	(Martinique) Golden Lion FC (DH)	1-0	Club Franciscain (DH) (Martinique)

=== Mayotte ===
These match was played on 17 October 2015.

Tie no	Home team (tier)	Score	Away team (tier)
1.	(Mayotte) AJ Kani-Kéli (PH)	2-3 (a.e.t.)	AS Jumeaux de M'zouazia (DH) (Mayotte)

=== Réunion ===
These matches was played on 3 and 25 October 2015.

Tie no	Home team (tier)	Score	Away team (tier)
1.	(Réunion) AS Excelsior	1-0	Saint-Pauloise FC (Réunion)
2.	(Réunion) US Sainte-Marienne	1-0	JS Saint-Pierroise (Réunion)

=== Alsace ===
These matches were played 24 and 25 October 2015.

Tie no	Home team (tier)	Score	Away team (tier)
1.	AS Erstein (DH)	0-4	US Sarre-Union (CFA)
2.	FCSR Haguenau (CFA2)	0-3	FC Mulhouse (CFA)
3.	SC Schiltigheim (CFA2)	3-2 (a.e.t.)	FC Soleil Bischheim (DH)
4.	SC Ebersheim (9)	1-0 (a.e.t.)	FC Hegenheim (DH)
5.	S Reunis Hoenheim (9)	0-6	FC Saint-Louis Neuweg (CFA)
6.	FCE Schirrhein (7)	3-2 (a.e.t.)	FC Obermodern (8)
7.	FC Kronenbourg Strasbourg (7)	1-2	RC Strasbourg Alsace (Nat)
8.	ASL Robertsau (7)	0-6	S Reunis Colmar (Nat)
9.	AS Ernolsheim Sur Bruche (7)	0-1	SC Dinsheim (DH)

=== Aquitaine ===
These matches were played 24 and 25 October 2015.

Tie no	Home team (tier)	Score	Away team (tier)
1.	FC de St Medard en Jalles (DH)	2-3	Trélissac FC (CFA)
2.	FC Libourne (DH)	2-0	Pau FC (CFA)
3.	Langon FC (DH)	0-1	Stade Bordelais ASPTT (CFA)
4.	St Paul S (8)	1-2	US Lege Cap Ferret (CFA2)
5.	Hiriburuko Ainhara St Pierre Irube (7)	1-3	Les Genêts d'Anglet Football (CFA2)
6.	US Castetis Gouze (11)	0-5	Stade Montois (CFA)

=== Atlantique ===
These matches were played 24 and 25 October 2015.

Tie no	Home team (tier)	Score	Away team (tier)
1.	SC Beaucouzé (DH)	1-1 (3-4 p)	Voltigeurs de Chateaubriant (CFA)
2.	St Nazaire Atlantique Football (DH)	4-4 (5-3 p)	SO Choletais (CFA)
3.	AS Bayard Saumur St Hilaire St Florent (8)	0-6	Vendee Lucon F (Nat)
4.	US Beaufort En Valle (8)	0-2	Vendee Les Herbiers F (Nat)
5.	FC Reze (DH)	0-1	US Ste Anne de Vertou (CFA2)
6.	Orvault Sports Football (DH)	5-3 (a.e.t.)	Entente S Segre (DH)
7.	FC des Achards (9)	0-0 (2-4 p)	ASPTT - CAEB Cholet (10)
8.	Olympique Saumur FC (DH)	2-0	Vendee Poire Sur Vie Football (CFA2)

=== Auvergne ===
These matches were played 24 and 25 October 2015.

Tie no	Home team (tier)	Score	Away team (tier)
1.	Ytrac Foot (DH)	0-1	SA Thiernois (CFA2)
2.	AS Yzeure 03 Auvergne (CFA)	0-4	AS Moulinoise (CFA)
3.	FC Espaly (7)	2-0	US St Beauzire (8)
4.	US St Georges les Ancizes (DH)	2-2 (4-5 p)	CS de Volvic (DH)
5.	US Vic Le Comte (8)	1-0	US Sanfloraine (DH)

=== Lower Normandy ===
These matches were played on 24 October 2015.

Tie no	Home team (tier)	Score	Away team (tier)
1.	SC Herouvillais (DH)	0-5	US d'Avranches Mont St Michel (Nat)
2.	FC Agon Coutainville (7)	1-3	FC St Lo Manche (CFA2)
3.	SU Divaise (DH)	4-0	FC Equeurdreville Hainneville (7)
4.	AS de Cherbourg F (DH)	1-3	US Granvillaise (CFA2)

=== Bourgogne ===
These matches were played on 24 and 25 October 2015.

Tie no	Home team (tier)	Score	Away team (tier)
1.	FC Gueugnonnais (CFA2)	1-3	SC Selongeen (CFA2)
2.	UF Maconnais (DH)	0-2	FC Montceau Bourgogne (CFA)
3.	AS Genlis (8)	1-2 (a.e.t.)	Louhans Cuiseaux FC (DH)
4.	FC Sens (CFA2)	2-0	Paron FC (DH)

=== Brittany ===
The match US Châteaugiron-US Saint-Malo was broadcast on Eurosport 2 France.

These matches were played on 24 and 25 October 2015.

Tie no	Home team (tier)	Score	Away team (tier)
1.	AS Retiers (8)	1-5	US Concarneau (CFA)
2.	En Avant Saint-Renan (8)	5-1	FC Landerneau (8)
3.	US Châteaugiron (9)	0-6	US Saint-Malo (CFA)
4.	ACF Plouzané (DH)	3-3 (2-4 p)	La Chapelle des Fougeretz/Montgermont (7)
5.	US Montagnarde (DH)	4-0	Vannes OC (DH)
6.	US Liffré (9)	2-0	FC Guipry-Messac (8)
7.	FC Breteil/Talensac (9)	0-1	Stade Briochin (CFA2)
8.	FC Noyal-Brécé (9)	0-3	TA Rennes (CFA2)
9.	FC Quimperlé (7)	1-3	GSI Pontivy (CFA2)
10.	FC La Plancoëtine (9)	1-4	FC La Gacilly (8)
11.	FC Rostrenen (8)	1-0	AS Saint-Martin-des-Champs (9)
12.	ES Saint-Thégonnec (8)	1-5	FC Paimpol (7)
13.	Pluvigner-Kériolets (7)	2-2 (0-3 p)	AGL Drapeau Fougères (CFA2)
14.	CPB Bréquigny Rennes (DH)	2-1	Stade Plabennecois (CFA)

=== Centre-Val de Loire ===
These matches were played on 24 October 2015.

Tie no	Home team (tier)	Score	Away team (tier)
1.	US Municipale Saran (DH)	2-2 (4-5 p)	Bourges Foot (DH)
2.	US Orleans Loiret F (Nat)	2-0 (a.e.t.)	Sologne Olympique Romorantin (CFA)
3.	Bourges 18 (CFA2)	0-0 (4-2 p)	La Berrichonne de Chateauroux (Nat)
4.	CS Mainvilliers F (7)	2-2 (5-3 p)	FC Chartres (CFA2)

=== Centre-West ===
These matches were played on 24 and 25 October 2015.

Tie no	Home team (tier)	Score	Away team (tier)
1.	FC Chauray (DH)	0-0 (2-4 p)	Entente S Gueretoise (7)
2.	Entente S La Rochelle (DH)	3-1	Angoulême Charente FC (CFA2)
3.	Limoges FC (CFA2)	2-0	US Chauvigny (DH)
4.	FC Nord 17 (9)	3-2	Amicale S Cozes (DH)
5.	US St Sauveur (7)	0-0 (4-2 p)	La Rochelle Villeneuve FC (8)
6.	AS Panazol (10)	2-1	CA St Savin St Germain (8)

=== Corsica ===
These matches were played on 24 and 25 October 2015.

Tie no	Home team (tier)	Score	Away team (tier)
1.	Borgo FC (CFA2)	5-0	CA Propriano (DH)
2.	F Balagne Ile Rousse (CFA2)	1-1 (3-2 p)	Etoile Filante Bastiase (DH)

=== Franche-Comté ===
These matches were played on 24 and 25 October 2015.

Tie no	Home team (tier)	Score	Away team (tier)
1.	Racing Besançon (CFA2)	5-1	Bresse Jura Foot (DH)
2.	AS Jura Dolois F (7)	2-5 (a.e.t.)	Jura Sud Foot (CFA)
3.	Besançon FC (CFA2)	1-0	US Pont De Roide Vermondans (DH)

=== Languedoc-Roussillon ===
These matches were played on 24 and 25 October 2015.

Tie no	Home team (tier)	Score	Away team (tier)
1.	US Salinieres Aigues Mortes (DH)	0-3	FC de Sete (CFA)
2.	Stade Balarucois (7)	2-1	Canet Roussillon FC (DH)
3.	OC Perpignan (DH)	4-2	FU Narbonne (DH)
4.	Avenir S Frontignan AC (DH)	3-0	Gallia C d'Uchaud (7)
5.	Arceaux Montpellier (8)	0-4	Avenir S Béziers (Nat)

=== Lorraine ===
These matches were played on 24 and 25 October 2015.

Tie no	Home team (tier)	Score	Away team (tier)
1.	Sarreguemines FC (CFA2)	5-3 (a.e.t.)	FC Luneville (DH)
2.	ASC Saulxures (10)	3-5 (a.e.t.)	S Reunis Deodatiens (DH)
3.	Jarville Jeunes Section F (DH)	0-3	AS Pagny Sur Moselle (CFA2)
4.	FC Pulnoy (8)	0-3	Renaissance S Magny (DH)
5.	AS Reding (9)	3-2	Etoile Naborienne (DH)
6.	FC Hettange Grande (7)	0-4	Amicale du Personnel Municipal Metz FC (DH)
7.	ASC Kellermann (10)	0-2	US Raon L'Etape (CFA2)
8.	Entente S Marange Silvange (9)	1-4	AS Clouange (8)

=== Maine ===
These matches were played on 25 October 2015.

Tie no	Home team (tier)	Score	Away team (tier)
1.	Amicale S La Chapelle St Aubin (8)	1-3 (a.e.t.)	US Changeenne (CFA2)
2.	CO St Saturnin Arche (DH)	2-1	Le Mans FC (CFA2)
3.	La Suze FC (DH)	1-1 (4-3 p)	Patriote Brulonnaise (7)

=== Méditerranée ===
These matches were played on 24 and 25 October 2015.

Tie no	Home team (tier)	Score	Away team (tier)
1.	Berre SC (7)	1-1 (4-2 p)	US Marignanaise (CFA)
2.	JS St Jean Beaulieu (7)	3-1	Aubagne FC (CFA2)
3.	AS Maximoise (7)	0-2	Etoile FC Frejus St Raphael (Nat)
4.	FC de l'Etoile et de l'Huveaune (8)	0-4	Groupe S Consolat (Nat)
5.	FC Istres Ouest Provence (7)	4-1	US Pegomas (8)

=== Midi-Pyrénées ===
These matches were played on 24 and 25 October 2015.

Tie no	Home team (tier)	Score	Away team (tier)
1.	US Colomiers F (CFA)	2-1 (a.e.t.)	Rodez Aveyron F (CFA)
2.	Cheminots S Severacais (8)	0-4	Rodeo FC (DH)
3.	Amicale S Muretaine (DH)	5-2 (a.e.t.)	O Girou FC (DH)
4.	Luzenac Ariege Pyrenees (DH)	2-3 (a.e.t.)	Montauban FCTG (7)
5.	FC de Foix (7)	2-2 (4-5 p)	Blagnac FC (CFA2)
6.	Entente RC SO Isle en Dodon (8)	0-1	Toulouse St Jo FSC (DH)

=== Nord-Pas de Calais ===
These matches were played on 24 and 25 October 2015.

Tie no	Home team (tier)	Score	Away team (tier)
1.	FC Masny (11)	1-3 (a.e.t.)	AS Marck (CFA2)
2.	AS de la Bourgogne Tourcoing (11)	0-4	Croix F Iris C (CFA)
3.	Le Touquet ACF Côte d'Opale (DH)	0-1	SC Hazebrouckois (DH)
4.	Dechy S (14)	0-3	US St Omer (DH)
5.	Ferrain A Neuvilloise 96 (DH)	2-3 (a.e.t.)	Entente S Wasquehal (CFA)
6.	AS Raimes Vicoigne (8)	0-3	SC Douai (8)
7.	FC Seclin (7)	1-4	US Boulogne Côte d'Opale (Nat)
8.	O Lumbrois (8)	1-2	Stade Bethunois (DH)
9.	AS Berck Plage (9)	1-2 (a.e.t.)	US Vimy (7)
10.	O Grande Synthe (CFA2)	0-1	St Amand FC (DH)
11.	AS Etaples (7)	1-5	US Littoral Dunkerque (Nat)
12.	AS Hellemmes (9)	0-2	AC Mons En Baroeul (8)
13.	L'Eclair Neufchatel (9)	0-1 (a.e.t.)	US Maubeuge (DH)

=== Champagne-Ardenne ===
These matches were played on 25 October 2015.

Tie no	Home team (tier)	Score	Away team (tier)
1.	CA Villers Semeuse (7)	0-1	Ecole de F Reims Ste Anne Chatillons (DH)
2.	AS de Prix Les Mezieres (DH)	2-1	FC Nogentais (DH)
3.	FC St Mesmin (7)	0-2	RC Épernay Champagne (CFA2)
4.	FC de l'Agglomeration Troyenne (DH)	1-6	CS Sedan Ardennes (Nat)

=== Normandy ===
These matches were played on 24 and 25 October 2015.

Tie no	Home team (tier)	Score	Away team (tier)
1.	C Municipal S d'Oissel (CFA2)	2-0	Pacy Menilles RC (DH)
2.	Amicale Laiq Deville Maromme (DH)	1-2 (a.e.t.)	Yvetot AC (7)
3.	Romilly Pont St Pierre FC (7)	0-3	US Quevilly Rouen Metropole (CFA)
4.	Entente S Municipale Gonfreville (CFA2)	3-3 (4-1 p)	US Gasny (DH)

=== Paris Île-de-France ===
These matches were played on 24 and 25 October 2015.

Tie no	Home team (tier)	Score	Away team (tier)
1.	Aubervilliers C (CFA)	3-1	Boulogne Billancourt AC (CFA)
2.	Blanc Mesnil SF (DH)	1-0	Jeanne d'Arc Drancy (CFA)
3.	St Leu 95 FC (9)	0-4	Noisy Le Sec Banlieue 93 O (CFA2)
4.	Chatou AS (8)	0-1	Viry Chatillon Entente S (CFA)
5.	Houilles AC (9)	0-1 (a.e.t.)	Sannois St Gratien Entente (CFA)
6.	Issy Les Moulineaux FC (7)	0-0 (2-4 p)	UJA Maccabi Paris Metropole (CFA2)
7.	RFC Argenteuil (9)	1-2 (a.e.t.)	Bretigny Foot CS (7)
8.	Neuilly Marne SFC (8)	0-1	Mantois 78 FC (CFA)
9.	FC d'Épinay Athletico (11)	1-3	St Ouen l'Aumone AS (CFA2)
10.	Grigny US (10)	0-1	Versailles 78 FC (DH)
11.	Deuil Enghien FC (10)	1-4	Poissy AS (CFA)

=== Picardie ===
These matches were played on 24 and 25 October 2015.

Tie no	Home team (tier)	Score	Away team (tier)
1.	AS du Pays Neslois (DH)	2-4	Amiens SC Picardie (Nat)
2.	E Itancourt-Neuville (7)	0-4	FC Chambly Thelle (Nat)
3.	US Choisy Au Bac (DH)	1-2 (a.e.t.)	US de Chantilly (DH)
4.	AS Beauvais Oise (CFA2)	3-1 (a.e.t.)	US Balagny St Epin (DH)
5.	Stade AS Moy de l'Aisne (8)	0-8	FC Ailly Sur Somme Samara (CFA2)
6.	A des FC de Creil (7)	1-0 (a.e.t.)	US Guignicourt (7)
7.	CO Albert S (DH)	0-2	AC Amiens (CFA)

=== Rhône-Alpes ===
These matches were played on 24 and 25 October 2015.

Tie no	Home team (tier)	Score	Away team (tier)
1.	FC de la Valdaine Cleon d'Andran (9)	2-4	FC de Limonest (DH)
2.	FC Vaulx En Velin (DH)	0-2	Lyon-Duchere AS (CFA)
3.	ESB F Marboz (7)	0-1	Grenoble Foot 38 (CFA)
4.	Chassieu Decines FC (7)	1-0	US Divonnaise (8)
5.	AS des Minguettes Venissieux (DH)	0-1	U Montilienne S (DH)
6.	O de Valence (8)	0-3	FC d'Echirolles (DH)
7.	US Gieroise (7)	2-0	MOS 3 Rivieres FC (7)
8.	AS Forez Andrezieux Boutheon (CFA2)	3-1	AC Ripagerien Rive de Gier (8)
9.	FC La Tour St Claire (DH)	0-1	FC Villefranche (CFA)
10.	Rhodia C du Peage de Rousillon (9)	2-3	FC d'Annecy (CFA2)
11.	Entente S de Manival St Ismer (9)	1-2 (a.e.t.)	FC Veyle Saône (7)
12.	FC Gringy (9)	0-3	Monts d'Or Azergues F(CFA)
13.	FC Pontcharra St Loup (10)	1-0	FC Gerland Lyon (11)
14.	Hauts Lyonnais (7)	1-1 (5-4 p)	Caluire SC (8)
